= John Childs =

John Childs may refer to:

- Jack Childs, FBI spy within the U.S. Communist Party
- John Childs (aviator), 18th century aviator
- John Childs (cricketer) (born 1951), English cricketer
- John Lewis Childs (1856–1921), horticultural businessman and politician who founded Floral Park, New York
- John W. Childs, founder of J.W. Childs Associates
- John Childs (murderer), British man convicted of six murders in 1979
- John Filby Childs (1783–1853), English printer and political radical
- John Childs (historian) (born 1949), professor of military history
- John L. Childs (1899–1985), American educator and author
- John Childs, victim of the 1995 kidnapping of Western tourists in Kashmir

== See also ==
- John Child (disambiguation)
