= Williamite War in Ireland =

War fought between 1689 and 1691

- Part of the Nine Years War
- The Battle of the Boyne, a major battle of the war
Date	12 March 1689 – 3 October 1691
Location	Kingdom of Ireland
Result	Treaty of Limerick

Belligerents
Williamites	Jacobites

Commanders and leaders
William III/II; Duke of Schomberg †; Godert de Ginkel	James II/VII; Earl of Tyrconnell; Patrick Sarsfield; William Dorrington; Duke of Berwick; Conrad von Rosen; Charles Chalmot de Saint-Ruhe †

Strength
44,000	36,000–39,000

Casualties and losses
10,000 killed or died of disease	15,293 killed or died of disease

The Williamite War in Ireland, (Note: Irish: Cogadh an Dá Rí, or "War of the two kings") March 1689 to October 1691, was fought between Jacobite supporters of James II and those of his successor, William III. Concluded by the Treaty of Limerick, it ended in a Williamite victory and is considered a related conflict of the 1688 to 1697 Nine Years' War.

The November 1688 Glorious Revolution replaced the Catholic James with his Protestant daughter Mary II and her husband William, who ruled as joint monarchs of England, Ireland, and Scotland. However, James retained considerable support in Ireland, where it was hoped he would address long-standing Catholic grievances on land ownership, religion and civic rights. In March 1689, he landed in Ireland with support from Louis XIV of France, who saw it as a means to divert resources from the ongoing Nine Years War.

The war with a series of skirmishes between the Catholic majority Irish Army, and Protestant militia. Their failure to capture Derry enabled William to land an expeditionary force, which defeated the main Jacobite army at the Boyne in July 1690. James returned to France after the battle, while the Jacobites were decisively defeated at Aughrim in 1691. The war ended with the Treaty of Limerick in October 1691.

Subsequent Jacobite risings were confined to Scotland and England, but the war had a lasting effect on the political and cultural landscape of Ireland, confirming British and Protestant rule over the country for over two centuries. While Limerick provided a series of guarantees to Catholics, subsequent extension of the penal laws would further erode their civic rights.

== Background ==
The war began in March 1689 when James II and VII landed in Ireland seeking to reverse the November 1688 Glorious Revolution, which had replaced him with his nephew William III and daughter Mary II. The conflict was part of the 1688 to 1697 Nine Years' War between Louis XIV of France and the Grand Alliance, a coalition led by William as Stadtholder of the Dutch Republic. Both Louis and William viewed Ireland as a subsidiary theatre, as did James, whose primary objective was to regain England.

Ireland was selected because some 75% of the population shared James' Catholicism, with Protestants concentrated in Ulster, where they comprised nearly 50% of the population. It also possessed a large Catholic army, built up by the Earl of Tyrconnell since 1687; although the majority were poorly equipped, unpaid recruits, James brought weapons and French regulars with him to provide training. However, the concessions demanded by Irish Catholics in return for their backing undermined Jacobite support in England and Scotland, which were overwhelmingly Protestant. This also applied to Ulster, without which James could not support the rising in Scotland, invade England or prevent William bringing in troops and supplies.

Their major demands included reversal of land confiscations which had reduced Catholic land ownership from 90% in 1600 to 22% by 1685. This was opposed both by Protestants and those members of the Irish Catholic elite who benefitted from previous settlements, among them Tyrconnell and James himself. Another was the autonomy of the Parliament of Ireland, an idea that clashed with Stuart ideology, which was strongly Unionist. These differing external and internal objectives undermined the Jacobite campaign.

== War ==
=== 1688–1689: the North ===
Prior to November 1688, James was confident enough in Ireland's loyalty that he ordered 2,500 troops, or around 40% of the Irish army, transferred to England. This deprived Tyrconnell of vital trained personnel, while their presence led to near mutiny in several of James' most reliable English units. Many of the Irish rank and file were arrested after William's landing, and later sent to serve under Emperor Leopold in the Austrian–Ottoman War.

The 1688/1689 Campaign in the North; key locations (20th Century Map)

Apparently shaken by the speed of James's fall, Tyrconnell opened negotiations with William, although this may have been a delaying tactic. His wife, Frances Talbot, was the elder sister of Sarah Churchill, whose husband Marlborough was a key member of the English military conspiracy against James. One of those transferred to England in September was Richard Hamilton, an Irish Catholic professional soldier. Confined in the Tower of London after James' flight, in January William sent him to negotiate with Tyrconnell: once back in Ireland, however, he is thought to have convinced Tyrconnell to abandon negotiations.

In January, Tyrconnell issued warrants for the recruitment of another 40,000 levies, almost entirely Catholic and organised along standard regimental lines. By spring 1689, the army theoretically had around 36,000 men, although experienced officers remained in short supply. Paying, equipping and training this number was impossible and many were organised as Rapparees or irregulars, largely beyond Tyrconnell's control. Despite assurances of protection, the easiest way to obtain supplies or money was to confiscate it from Protestants; many fled to the North or England, spreading "predictions of impending catastrophe".

Fears grew as areas outside the towns became increasingly lawless, exacerbated when Dublin Castle ordered Protestant militia to be disarmed. This caused an exodus from the countryside; the population of Derry grew from 2,500 in December to over 30,000 by April. Doubts over the ability of Tyrconnell's regime to ensure law and order was not confined to Protestants; many Catholics also sought security abroad or in large towns.

James landed in Kinsale on 12 March, accompanied by French regulars under Conrad von Rosen, along with English, Scottish and Irish volunteers. The news sparked pro-Williamite demonstrations in Belfast, offset by a more cautious response elsewhere. Arthur Rawdon, who later organised the Army of the North, had offered to fight for James against Monmouth in 1685 and did not commit to William until March 1689. Protestants were concentrated in Ulster and urban centres such as Sligo and Dublin, which Tyrconnell sought to secure with Catholic units of the Irish army. Catholic troops were refused entry to Derry on 7 December, although the Protestant town council simultaneously declared their "duty and loyalty to our sovereign lord, (James)".

William viewed it as a French proxy invasion, best dealt with by attacking France and agreed to divert resources only because "abandoning" beleaguered Irish Protestants was politically unacceptable in England and Scotland. On 8 March, the English Parliament approved funding for an Irish expeditionary force of 22,230 men, composed of new levies and European mercenaries. In return, Parliament agreed to join the Grand Alliance and become part of the wider Nine Years' War.

Hamilton had been appointed Jacobite commander in the North, and on 14 March he secured eastern Ulster by routing a Williamite militia at Dromore. On 11 April, Viscount Dundee launched a Jacobite rising in Scotland; on the 18th, James joined the siege of Derry and on the 29th, the French landed another 1,500–3,000 Jacobites at Bantry Bay. When reinforcements from England reached Derry in mid-April, governor Robert Lundy advised them to return, claiming the city was indefensible. Their commanders, Richards and Cunningham, were later dismissed by William for cowardice and Lundy fled the town in disguise.

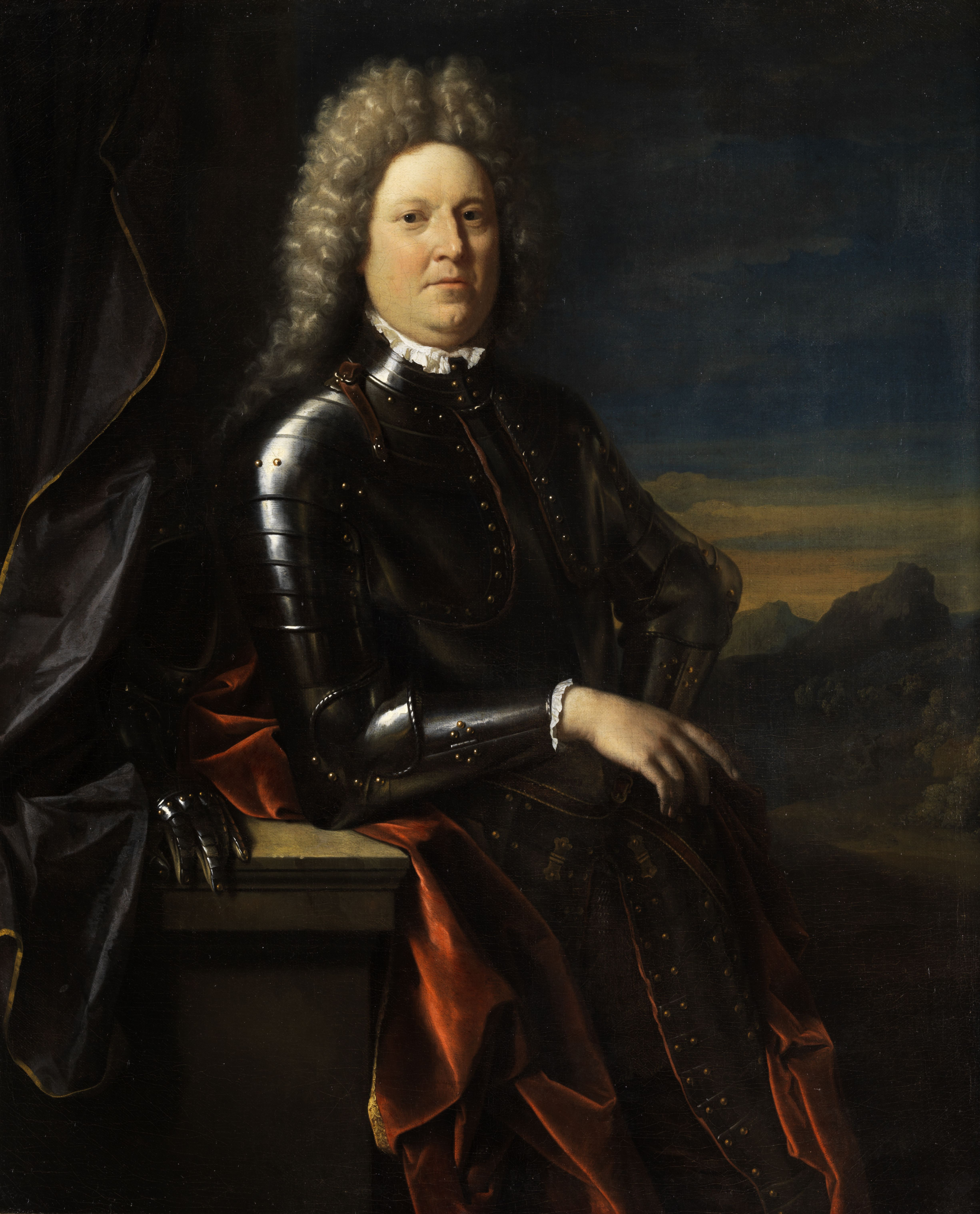
Schomberg (1615–1690), Williamite commander in Ireland; immensely experienced, he was a Marshal of France, England and Portugal.

The Jacobite focus on western Ulster, specifically Derry and Enniskillen, has been described as a strategic error. The eastern region was of greater significance, since it allowed mutual support between Irish and Scots Jacobites and, if it had been captured, resupply from England would have been made far more difficult. By mid May, the Williamite position had improved; on 16th, government forces retained control of Kintyre, cutting direct links between Scotland and Ireland. The main Jacobite army was stuck outside Derry, its French contingent proving more unpopular with their Irish colleagues than their opponents. On 11 June, four battalions of Williamite reinforcements under the tough and experienced Percy Kirke arrived on the Foyle, north of Derry.

The war in the North turned on three events in the last week of July. Dundee's victory at Killiecrankie on the 27th was offset by his own death and heavy losses among his troops, ending the Scottish rising as a serious threat. On the 28th, Kirke's forces broke the Jacobite blockade with naval support and raised the siege of Derry; the besiegers fired the surrounding countryside and retreated south. On the 31st, a Jacobite attack on Enniskillen was defeated at Newtownbutler; over 1,500 men were killed and its leader Mountcashel captured. From a position of virtual domination, the Jacobites lost their hold on Ulster within a week.

On 13 August, Schomberg landed in Belfast Lough with the main Williamite army; by the end of the month, he had more than 20,000 men. Carrickfergus fell on 27 August; James insisted on holding Dundalk, against the advice of his French advisors who wanted to retreat beyond the Shannon. Tyrconnell was pessimistic about their chances but an opportunity for Schomberg to end the war by taking Dundalk was missed, largely due to a complete failure of logistics.

Ireland was a relatively poor country with a small population, obliging both armies to depend on external support. While this ultimately proved a greater problem for the Jacobites, Schomberg's men lacked tents, coal, food and clothing, largely because his inexperienced commissary agent in Chester could not charter enough ships. This was worsened by choosing a campsite on low, marshy ground, which autumn rains and lack of hygiene quickly turned into a stinking swamp. Nearly 6,000 men died from disease before Schomberg ordered a withdrawal into winter quarters in November. Inspecting the abandoned camp, John Stevens, an English Catholic serving with the Grand Prior's Regiment, recorded that "a vast number of dead bodies was found there unburied, and not a few yet breathing but almost devoured with lice and other vermin".

=== Jacobite political and strategic objectives 1689–1690 ===
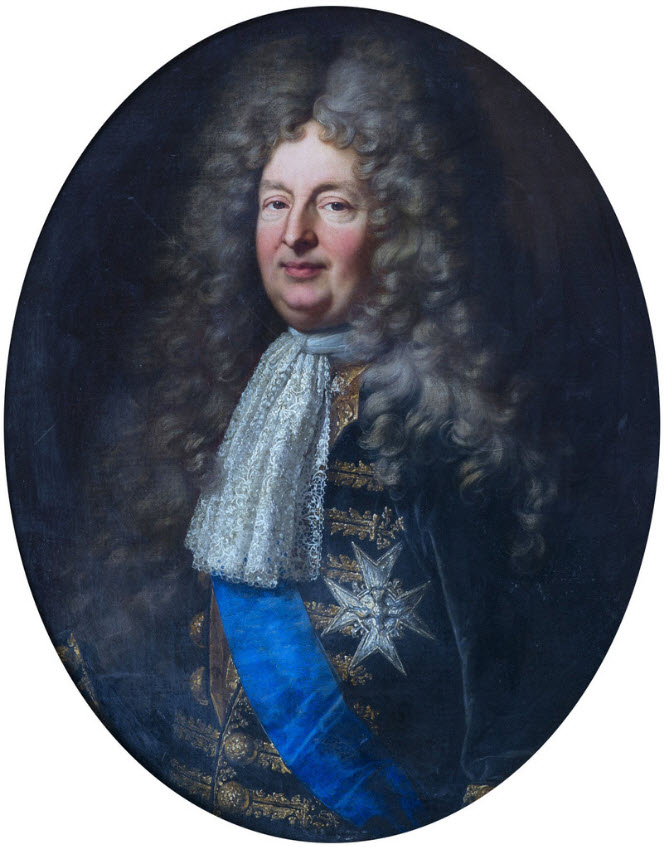
French envoy d'Avaux, whose relationship with the Irish was one of mutual mistrust and dislike

The Jacobites were undermined by differing political and strategic objectives, reflected in the Irish Parliament that sat from May to July. Since no elections were held in Counties Fermanagh and Donegal, the Commons was 70 members short and largely composed of Catholics; of these, a minority were members of the old Gaelic gentry or 'Old Irish', the majority being so-called 'Old English' of Anglo-Norman descent. Five Protestant peers and four Church of Ireland bishops sat in the Lords, with Anthony Dopping, Bishop of Meath acting as leader of the opposition.

Dubbed the "Patriot Parliament" by 19th century nationalist historian Charles Duffy, in reality it was deeply divided. For James, regaining England was his main objective, and concessions to his Irish supporters potentially weakened his position there. In the early stages of the war, Protestant Jacobite support was more significant than often appreciated and included many members of the established Church of Ireland, the most prominent being Viscount Mountjoy. His opposition to Irish autonomy meant James made concessions with great reluctance and despite his own Catholicism, insisted on the rights of the established church.

While personally loyal to James, Tyrconnell viewed his restoration as secondary to preservation of Catholic rights. One of the few Catholics who benefited from the 1662 Land Settlement, he and other beneficiaries had no desire to make substantial changes to it. Led by the Earl of Limerick, this faction urged a compromise settlement with William in January. They were opposed by the 'Old Irish', whose main demand was regaining estates confiscated from them after the 1652 Cromwellian conquest.

As a result, a significant proportion of the Irish Parliament preferred to negotiate, which meant avoiding combat to preserve the army and retain as much territory as possible. James himself viewed war in Ireland as a dead-end, and pointed out that the French provided only enough supplies to keep the conflict going, not win it. As a former naval commander, he argued retaking England meant a cross-Channel invasion, and French suggestions of doing so via the Irish Sea were simply unrealistic. Since the French navy was unable to resupply their own forces in Ireland, it was unlikely they could control the Irish Sea long enough to land troops in the face of a hostile population.

Peripheral rebellions in Ireland and Scotland were a cost-effective way for France to divert British (and Dutch) resources from Europe. This meant prolonging the war was more useful than winning it, although it was potentially devastating for the local populace, a dilemma that resurfaced in the 1745 Scottish Rising. In 1689, the French envoy d'Avaux urged the Jacobites to withdraw beyond the Shannon, first destroying everything in between, including Dublin. Unsurprisingly, this suggestion was rejected, as the Irish were united in their dislike of the French in general and d'Avaux in particular. The feeling was mutual; when replaced in April 1690, d'Avaux told his successor Lauzun the Irish were 'a poor-spirited and cowardly people, whose soldiers never fight and whose officers will never obey orders.'

=== 1690: the Boyne and Limerick ===
In April 1690, an additional 6,000 French regulars arrived, in exchange for a roughly equivalent number of Irish troops under Mountcashel, who were sent to France. To retain as much territory as possible, the Jacobites held a line along the River Boyne, first destroying or removing crops and livestock to the north. This reduced the local population to utter misery; a French official recorded his horror at seeing people "eating grass like horses", or their corpses littering the roads. It took over fifty years for the area around Drogheda to recover from this devastation.

Faced by demands from his English government that he resolve the position in Ireland before taking the offensive in Flanders, William committed the majority of his available forces there and took personal command of the campaign. On 14 June 1690, 300 ships arrived in Belfast Lough carrying nearly 31,000 men, a combination of Dutch, English and Danish regiments. Parliament backed him with increased funding and the issues faced by Schomberg were remedied, transportation costs alone rising from £15,000 in 1689 to over £100,000 in 1690.

The Jacobites established defensive positions at Oldbridge, outside Drogheda on the south bank of the Boyne. In the Battle of the Boyne on 1 July, William crossed the river in several places, forcing them to retreat. The result itself was not decisive, with fewer than 2,000 dead on both sides, including Schomberg, but demoralised and weakened by desertion, the Jacobite army retreated to Limerick. This allowed William to enter Dublin unopposed. On top of this, James, believing the war was lost, escaped to France from Kinsale, never again to return to any of his former kingdoms.

Elsewhere, victory at Fleurus on 1 July gave the French control of Flanders; on the same day as the Boyne, they defeated a combined Anglo-Dutch fleet at Beachy Head, causing panic in England. As a former English naval commander, James recognised control of the Channel was a rare opportunity and urged France to commence an immediate naval invasion. However, the French failed to follow up their victory and by August, the Anglo-Dutch fleet had regained command of the sea.

Tyrconnell had spent the winter of 1689 to 1690 urging Louis XIV to support a "descent on England" and avoid fighting on Irish soil. His requests were rejected; an invasion required enormous expenditure and Louis trusted neither James nor his English supporters. While there were sound strategic reasons for his hurried departure, which were backed by his senior commanders, James has gone down in Irish history as Séamus an Chaca or "James the beshitten/coward".

An opportunity to end the war was missed when William overestimated the strength of his position. The Declaration of Finglas of 17 July excluded Jacobite officers and the Catholic landed class from a general pardon, encouraging them to continue fighting. Shortly afterwards, James Douglas and 7,500 men tried to break the Jacobite defensive line along the Shannon by taking Athlone. However they lacked sufficient siege artillery and provisions and rumors had reached Douglas that Patrick Sarsfield was marching with 15,000 men to cut off their forces from retreat. Douglas decided to withdraw in the middle of the night and by alternate route to avoid meeting the Irish force.

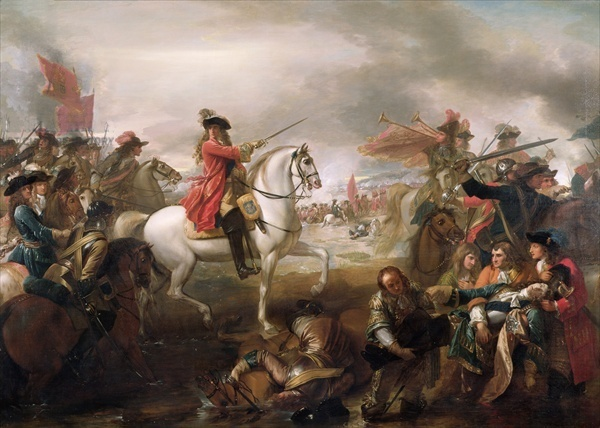
The Boyne; a narrow Williamite victory, in which Schomberg was killed (bottom right)

Limerick, strategic key to the west of Ireland, became William's next objective, the Jacobites concentrating the bulk of their forces in the city. A detachment under Marlborough captured Cork and Kinsale but Limerick repulsed a series of assaults, inflicting heavy casualties. Cavalry raids led by Sarsfield destroyed William's artillery train and heavy rain prevented replacements. Faced by multiple threats in mainland Europe, William withdrew and left Ireland in late 1690, the Jacobites retaining large parts of western Ireland.

The Dutch general Godert de Ginkel assumed command, based at Kilkenny, with Douglas in Ulster and the Danes under Württemberg at Waterford. Protestant administration was re-established in the counties held by Williamites, with arrests and confiscation of Jacobite estates, intended to reward William's supporters. Ginkel pointed out doing so in cash, not land, was cheaper than a month of war and urged more generous terms.

On 24 July, a letter from James confirmed ships were on their way to evacuate the French brigade and any others who wanted to leave; he also released his Irish officers from their oaths, allowing them to seek a negotiated end to the war. Tyrconnell and the French troops sailed from Galway in early September; James's inexperienced illegitimate son James FitzJames, 1st Duke of Berwick was left in command, supported by a council of officers composed of Thomas Maxwell, Dominic Sheldon, John Hamilton and Sarsfield.

Tyrconnell hoped to obtain sufficient French support to extend the conflict and gain better terms, which he told Louis could be done with limited numbers of French troops. A negotiated peace also required him to reduce the influence of the pro-war party, led by Sarsfield, who was increasingly popular with the army. He told James the pro-war group wanted Irish autonomy or even independence, while he wished to see Ireland linked firmly to England; to do so, he needed arms, money and an 'experienced' French general to replace Sarsfield and Berwick.

=== 1691: Athlone, Aughrim and the second siege of Limerick ===
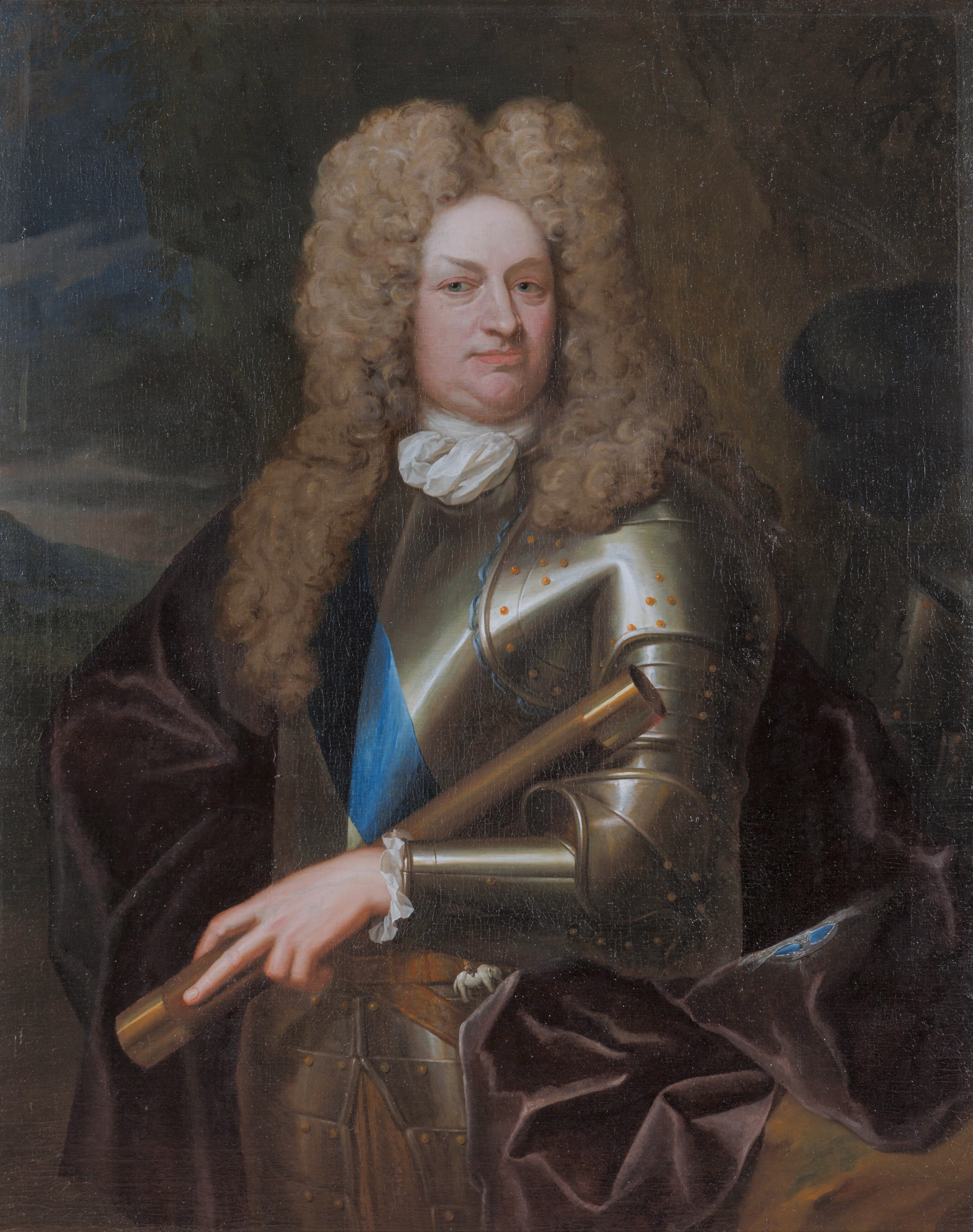
Godert de Ginkel, who advocated a cautious approach and attempted to end Jacobite resistance by offering a revised peace settlement

By late 1690, divisions between the Jacobite "Peace Party" and "War Party" had widened. Those who supported Tyrconnell's efforts to negotiate with William included senior officers Thomas Maxwell and John Hamilton, in addition to political figures such as Lord Riverston and Denis Daly. Sarsfield's "War Party" argued William could still be defeated; while once characterised as representing the 'Old Irish' interest, its leaders included the English officer Dorrington and 'Old English' Purcell and Luttrell.

Encouraged by William's failure to take Limerick and looking to reduce Tyrconnell's influence, Sarsfield's faction appealed directly to Louis XIV requesting that Tyrconnell and Berwick were removed from office. They also asked for substantial French military aid, although this was unlikely as the French regime saw Flanders, the Rhine, and Italy as greater strategic priorities. Ginkel had finally obtained William's permission to offer the Jacobites moderate terms of surrender, including a guarantee of religious toleration, but when in December the "Peace Party" made moves to accept, Sarsfield demanded that Berwick have Hamilton, Riverston and Daly arrested. Berwick complied, although likely with the tacit approval of Tyrconnell, who returned from France to try to regain control by offering Sarsfield concessions.

Deeply alarmed by the rift between his Irish supporters, James was persuaded to request further military support directly from Louis. Louis dispatched general Charles Chalmot, Marquis de Saint-Ruhe, to replace Berwick as commander of the Irish Army, with secret instructions to assess the situation and help Louis make a decision on whether to send additional military aid. Saint-Ruhe, accompanied by lieutenant-generals de Tessé and d'Usson, arrived at Limerick on 9 May; they brought sufficient arms, corn and meal to sustain the army until the autumn, but no troops or money.

By late spring, concerned that a French convoy could land further reinforcements at Galway or Limerick, Ginkel began making preparations to enter the field as quickly as possible. During May, both sides began assembling their forces for a summer campaign, the Jacobites at Limerick and the Williamites at Mullingar, while low-level skirmishing continued. On 16 June Ginkel's cavalry began reconnoitring from Ballymore towards Athlone. Saint-Ruhe had initially strung out his forces behind the line of the Shannon, but by 19 June he realised Athlone was the target and began concentrating his troops west of the town. Ginkel breached the Jacobite lines of defence and took Athlone on 30 June after a short but bloody siege, taking Maxwell prisoner; Saint-Ruhe failed in his attempts to relieve the garrison and fell back to the west.

Athlone was seen as a significant victory for William's forces, as it was believed that Saint-Ruhe's army would most likely collapse if the Shannon was crossed. The Lords Justice in Dublin issued a proclamation offering generous terms for Jacobites who surrendered, including a free pardon, restoration of forfeited estates, and the offer of similar or higher rank and pay if they wished to join William's army. The Jacobite command fell apart in mutual recriminations: Sarsfield's faction accused Maxwell, a follower of Tyrconnell, of treachery, while Saint-Ruhe's subordinate d'Usson sided with Tyrconnell, who appointed him governor of Galway.

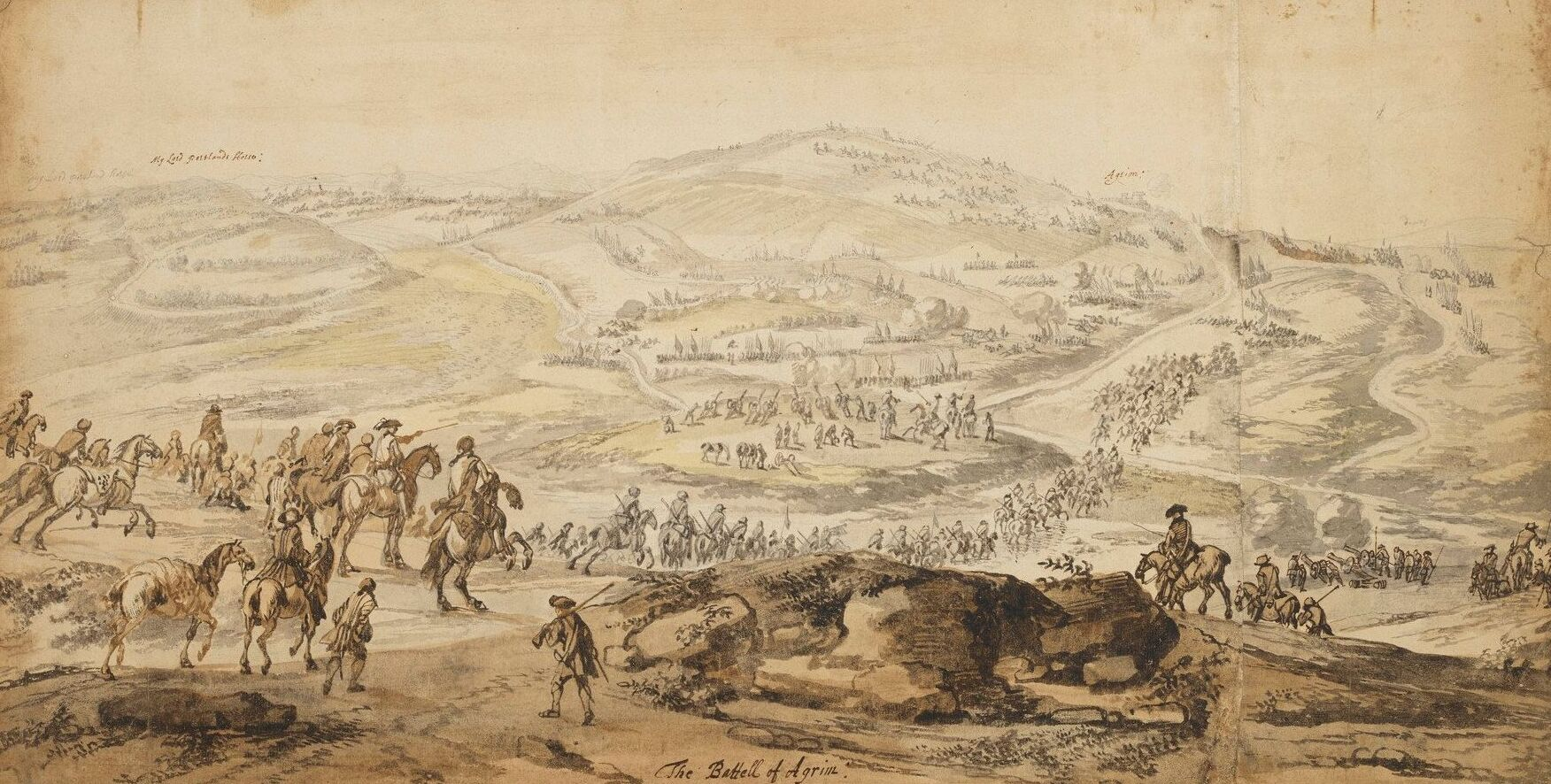
Contemporary sketch of Aughrim, viewed from the Williamite lines, by Jan Wyk

Unaware of the location of Saint-Ruhe's main army and assuming he was outnumbered, on 10 July Ginkel continued a cautious advance through Ballinasloe down the main Limerick and Galway road. Saint-Ruhe's initial plan, endorsed by Tyrconnell, had been to fall back on Limerick and force the Williamites into another year of campaigning, but wishing to redeem his errors at Athlone he appears to have instead decided to force a decisive battle. Ginkel, with an army of 20,000 men, found his way blocked by Saint-Ruhe's similarly sized army at Aughrim on the early morning of 12 July. Despite a brave and tenacious defence by the inexperienced Irish infantry, the Battle of Aughrim would see Saint-Ruhe dead, many senior Jacobite officers captured or killed, and the Jacobite army shattered.

D'Usson succeeded as overall commander: he surrendered Galway on 21 July, on advantageous terms. Following Aughrim the remnants of Saint-Ruhe's army retreated to the mountains before regrouping under Sarsfield's command at Limerick, where the defences were still in the process of being repaired: many of the Jacobite infantry regiments were seriously depleted, although some stragglers arrived later. Tyrconnell, who had been sick for some time, died at Limerick shortly afterwards, depriving the Jacobites of their main negotiator. Sarsfield and the Jacobites' main army surrendered at Limerick in October after a short siege.

=== Treaty of Limerick ===
Now the senior Jacobite commander, Sarsfield signed the Treaty of Limerick with Ginkel on 3 October 1691. It promised freedom of worship for Catholics, and legal protection for any Jacobites willing to swear an oath of loyalty to William and Mary, although the estates of those killed prior to the treaty were still liable to forfeiture. It also agreed to Sarsfield's demand that those still serving in the Jacobite army could leave for France. Popularly known as the "Flight of the Wild Geese", the process began almost immediately and was completed by December.

Modern estimates suggest that around 19,000 soldiers and rapparees departed: women and children brought the figure to slightly over 20,000, or about one per cent of Ireland's population. Some of the soldiers allegedly had to be forced on board the ships when they learned they would be joining the French army. Most were unable to bring or contact their families, and many appear to have deserted en route from Limerick to Cork, the point of departure.

== Aftermath ==
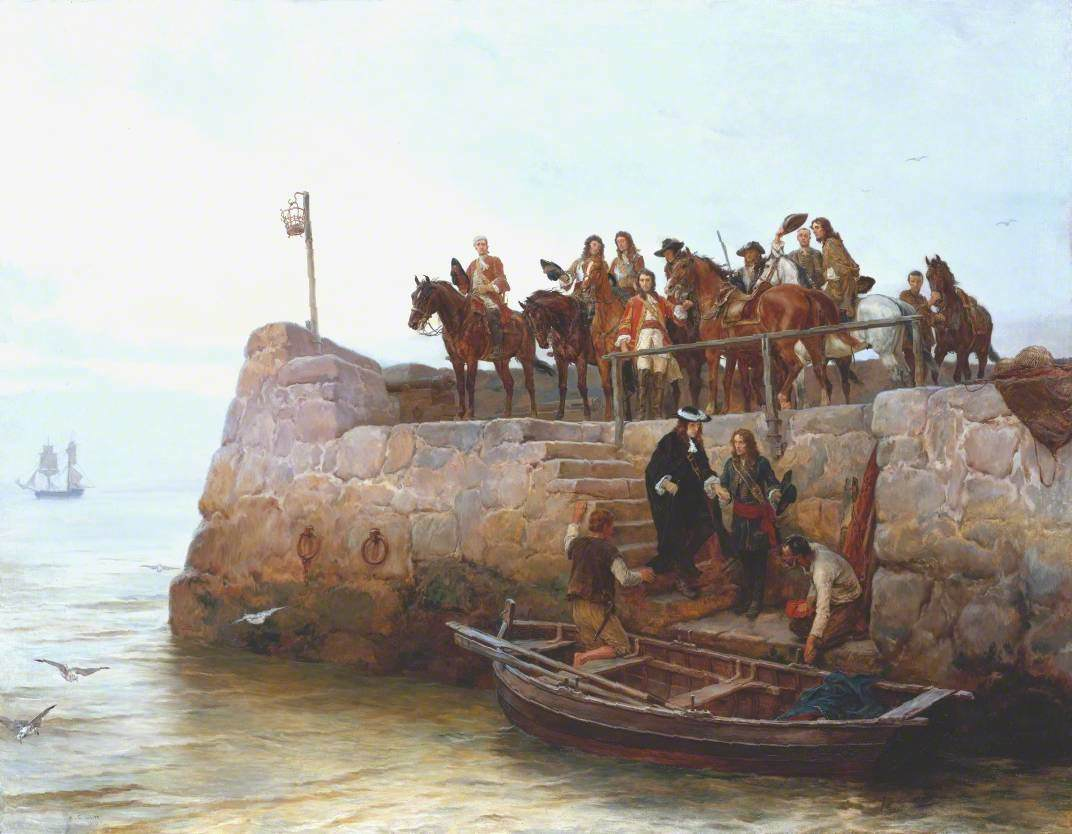
A Lost Cause by Andrew Carrick Gow. James II departed into exile in France and was followed by many of his Jacobite supporters over the next few years as the Wild Geese.

The "Wild Geese" were initially formed into James II's army in exile. After James's death, they were merged into France's Irish Brigade, which had been set up in 1689 using the 6,000 troops accompanying Mountcashel. Disbanded Jacobites still presented a considerable risk to security in Ireland and despite resistance from the English and Irish parliaments, William continued to encourage them to join his own army; by the end of 1693 a further 3,650 former Jacobites had joined William's forces fighting on the Continent. The Lord Lieutenant Viscount Sidney eventually restricted enlistment to "known Protestants", upon which the last remnants of the Jacobite army still in Ireland were sent home with a financial inducement to keep the peace.

In the interim the English legislature, possibly acting under pressure from Irish Protestant refugees in London, passed a 1691 Act "for the Abrogating the Oath of Supremacy in Ireland and Appointing other Oaths". This required anyone taking the Oath of Supremacy, such as when practising law, as a physician, or when taking a seat in the Irish Parliament, to deny transubstantiation; it effectively barred all Catholics, although included a clause exempting beneficiaries of the articles of Limerick in some circumstances. Despite this, many Protestants were initially outraged by their perception that the treaty had left the Jacobites "immune to the penalties of defeat". The fact that the administration chose to forbid searches for Jacobite arms and horses in order to prevent the settling of private scores was taken as evidence of pro-Catholic bias, and it was even rumoured that the Lord Chancellor Sir Charles Porter was a "secret Jacobite".

Continuing fears over Catholics' potential support of a French invasion and the appointment in 1695 of Capell as Lord Deputy saw a change of attitude. The same year, the Irish Parliament passed the Disarming Act, forbidding Catholics other than the Limerick and Galway 'articlemen' to own a weapon or a horse worth more than £5. A second 1695 bill, designed to deter Irish Catholics "from their foreign correspondency and dependency" and aimed particularly at the country's "English ancient families", restrained Catholics from educating their children abroad. Catholic gentry saw such actions as a serious breach of faith, summed up by the phrase cuimhnigí Luimneach agus feall na Sassanaigh ("remember Limerick and Saxon perfidy") supposedly used in later years by the exiles of the Irish Brigade. However, despite later extension of the penal laws, the 'articlemen' of Limerick, Galway, Drogheda and other garrisons subject to Williamite articles of surrender generally stayed exempt for the remainder of their lives.

=== Long-term effects ===
The Williamite victory in the war in Ireland had two main long-term results. The first was that it ensured James II would not regain his thrones in England, Ireland and Scotland by military means. The second was that it ensured further British and Protestant dominance over Ireland. Until the nineteenth century, Ireland was ruled by what became known as the "Protestant Ascendancy", the mostly Protestant ruling class. The majority Irish Catholic community and the Ulster-Scots Presbyterian community were systematically excluded from power, which was based on land ownership.

For over a century after the war, Irish Catholics maintained a sentimental attachment to the Jacobite cause, portraying James and the Stuarts as the rightful monarchs who would have given a just settlement to Ireland, including self-government, restoration of confiscated lands and tolerance for Catholicism. Thousands of Irish soldiers left the country to serve the Stuart monarchs in the Spanish and French armies. Until 1766, France and the Papacy supported a Stuart restoration in one or all of their kingdoms. At least one composite Irish battalion (500 men) drawn from Irish soldiers in the French service, fought on the Jacobite side in the Scottish Jacobite uprisings up to the Battle of Culloden in 1746.

The war also began the penetration of the Irish Protestant gentry into the British army's officer corps; by the 1770s, Irish Protestants made up about one third of the officer corps as a whole, a number hugely disproportionate to their population.

Protestants portrayed the Williamite victory as a triumph for religious and civil liberty. Triumphant murals of King William still controversially adorn gable walls in Ulster, and the defeat of the Catholics in the Williamite war is still commemorated by Protestant Unionists, particularly by the Orange Order on the Twelfth of July.

== See also ==
- Danish Auxiliary Corps in the Williamite War in Ireland
- Early Modern Ireland 1536–1691
- Ireland 1691–1801
- Jacobite rising of 1689
- Monmouth Rebellion

== Sources ==
- Bartlett, Thomas; Jeffery, Keith (1997). A Military History of Ireland. Cambridge UP.
- Bradshaw, Brendan (2016). And so began the Irish Nation: Nationality, National Consciousness and Nationalism in Pre-modern Ireland. Routledge. ISBN 978-1472442567.
- Chandler, David G. (2003). Marlborough as Military Commander. Spellmount Ltd. ISBN 978-1-86227-195-1.
- Childs, John (2007). The Williamite Wars in Ireland 1688 – 1691. London: Hambledon Continuum Press. ISBN 978-1-85285-573-4.
- Childs, John (1987). The British Army of William III, 1689–1702. Manchester University Press. ISBN 978-0719019876.
- Clarke, JS (1816). The Life of James the Second, King of England, Collected Out of Memoirs Writ of His Own Hand, Vol. 2 of 2 (2017 ed.). Forgotten Books. ISBN 978-0265170588.
- Connolly, S.J. (2008). Divided Kingdom: Ireland 1630–1800. Oxford UP.
- Deane, Seamus (1993). "The Siege of Derry". Grand Street (44): 26–27. doi:10.2307/25007608. ISSN 0734-5496. JSTOR 25007608.
- Doherty, Richard (Autumn 1995). "The Battle of Aughrim". Early Modern History (1500–1700). 3 (3).
- Gillespie, Raymond (1992). "The Irish Protestants and James II, 1688–90". Irish Historical Studies. 28 (110): 124–133. doi:10.1017/S0021121400010671. JSTOR 30008314. S2CID 163524916.
- Harris, Tim (2005). Revolution: The Great Crisis of the British Monarchy, 1685–1720 (2007 ed.). Penguin. ISBN 978-0141016528.
- Hayes-McCoy, G. A. (1942). "The Battle of Aughrim". Journal of the Galway Archaeological and Historical Society. 20 (1).
- Hayton, David (2004). Ruling Ireland, 1685–1742: Politics, Politicians and Parties. Boydell.
- Hayton, D. W. (1991). Israel, Jonathan (ed.). The Williamite Revolution in Ireland 1688–1691 in The Anglo-Dutch Moment: Essays on the Glorious Revolution and Its World Impact (2008 ed.). Cambridge University Press. ISBN 978-0521390750.
- Kinsella, Eoin (2009). "In pursuit of a positive construction: Irish Catholics and the Williamite articles of surrender, 1690–1701". Eighteenth-Century Ireland. 24: 11–35. doi:10.3828/eci.2009.4. hdl:10197/6428.
- Lenihan, Padraig (2001). Conquest and Resistance: War in Seventeenth-Century Ireland. Brill. ISBN 978-9004117433.
- Lenihan, Padraig (2003). Battle of the Boyne 1690. Gloucester. ISBN 978-0-7524-2597-9.
- Lynn, John A (1999). The Wars of Louis XIV: 1667–1714. Longman. ISBN 0-58205629-2.
- Lynn, John (1996). The Wars of Louis XIV, 1667–1714 (Modern Wars in Perspective). Longman. ISBN 978-0582056299.
- McKay, Derek (1983). The Rise of the Great Powers 1648–1815. Routledge. ISBN 978-0582485549.
- McGarry, Stephen (2014). Irish Brigades Abroad. Dublin. ISBN 978-1-845887-995.
- McGrath, Charles Ivar (1996). "Securing the Protestant Interest: The Origins and Purpose of the Penal Laws of 1695". Irish Historical Studies. 30 (117): 25–46. doi:10.1017/S0021121400012566. hdl:10197/9696. S2CID 159743855.
- Magennis, Eoin (1998). "A 'Beleaguered Protestant'?: Walter Harris and the Writing of Fiction Unmasked in Mid-18th-Century Ireland". Eighteenth-Century Ireland. 13: 86–111. doi:10.3828/eci.1998.8. JSTOR 30064327. S2CID 256129781.
- Maguire, William A. (1990). Kings in Conflict: the Revolutionary War in Ireland and its Aftermath 1688–1750. Blackstaff.
- Manning, Roger (2006). An Apprenticeship in Arms: The Origins of the British Army 1585–1702. Oxford UP.
- Miller, John (1978). James II; A study in kingship (1991 ed.). Methuen. ISBN 978-0413652904.
- Moody; Martin; Byrne, eds. (2009). A New History of Ireland: Volume III: Early Modern Ireland 1534–1691. OUP. ISBN 9780198202424.
- Moylan, Seamas (1996). The Language of Kilkenny: Lexicon, Semantics, Structures. Geography Publications. ISBN 9780906602706.
- Murtagh, Diarmuid (1953). "Louth Regiments in the Irish Jacobite Army". Journal of the County Louth Archaeological Society. 13 (1): 8–15. doi:10.2307/27728834. JSTOR 27728834.
- O'Sullivan, Harold (1992). "The Jacobite Ascendancy and Williamite Revolution and Confiscations in County Louth 1684–1701". Journal of the County Louth Archaeological and Historical Society. 4 (22): 430–445. doi:10.2307/27729726. JSTOR 27729726.
- Pearsall, AWH (1986). "The Royal Navy and trade protection 1688–1714". Renaissance and Modern Studies. 30 (1): 109–123. doi:10.1080/14735788609366499.
- Simms, J.G (1969). Jacobite Ireland. London. ISBN 978-1-85182-553-0.
- Simms, JG (1986). War and Politics in Ireland, 1649-1730. Continnuum-3PL. ISBN 978-0907628729.
- Stephen, Jeffrey (January 2010). "Scottish Nationalism and Stuart Unionism". Journal of British Studies. 49 (1, Scottish Special). doi:10.1086/644534. S2CID 144730991.
- Stevens, John. The journal of John Stevens, containing a brief account of the war in Ireland, 1689–1691. University College, Cork.
- Szechi, Daniel (1994). The Jacobites: Britain and Europe 1688–1788. Manchester University Press. ISBN 9780719037740.
- Wauchope, Piers (1992). Patrick Sarsfield and the Williamite War. Dublin. ISBN 978-0-7165-2476-2.
- Wilson, Philip (1903). "Ireland under James II." . In O'Brien, R. Barry (ed.). Studies in Irish History, 1649–1775. Dublin: Browne and Nolan. pp. 1–65.
- Wormsley, David (2015). James II: The Last Catholic King. Allen Lane. ISBN 978-0141977065.
- Zimmerman, Doron (2003). The Jacobite Movement in Scotland and in Exile, 1749–1759. Palgrave Macmillan. ISBN 978-1403912916.
