= Dominic Sheldon =

English soldier and courtier

Dominic Sheldon, often written as Dominick Sheldon, was an English soldier. A leading Jacobite he served in James II's Irish Army during the Williamite War between 1689 and 1691. He was a noted cavalry commander, present at the Battle of the Boyne and Battle of Aughrim. Later after going into exile, he rose to the rank of lieutenant general in the French Army. He was also remained a prominent courtier at the Jacobite court in exile at Saint Germain.

== Early career ==
Sheldon was a Roman Catholic from Warwickshire and a Tory supporter of James II. His brother Ralph Sheldon served as an equerry to the King. He fought with an English Regiment of the French Army during the 1670s, but after 1678 he was unemployed for seven years.

In 1685 he was commissioned into the Royal Irish Army by the Earl of Tyrconnell, as part of an attempt to purge Protestants and replace them with Catholic supporters of the King. He was commissioned as a captain in the Irish Foot Guards.

Following the Glorious Revolution of 1688 in England, he continued to serve with the mainly Catholic forces still loyal to James in Ireland. Several other English Catholics such as William Dorrington were prominent commanders of the Irish Army. He held the rank of lieutenant colonel at this stage.

== Irish war ==
In 1689 he accompanied Richard Hamilton during his march through Ulster in which the Protestant Army of the North were scattered at the Break of Dromore. Sheldon was present at the unsuccessful Siege of Derry the same year.

He was involved in heavy fighting at the Battle of the Boyne in July 1690, reportedly having two horses shot from under him. He accompanied the Irish Army during its retreat to Limerick, where they won an unexpected victory during the First Siege of Limerick. He was a close political ally of Lord Tyrconnell, and took his side when questions were raised about his conduct of the war.

After further Jacobite defeats at the Battle of Aughrim and the Second Siege of Limerick, he took part in the Flight of the Wild Geese that followed the peace agreement. Sheldon was in charge of shipping the Irish Army to France to continue to serve James II and his French allies.

== French service ==
Sheldon was made a colonel in the French Army commanding a unit of exiled Irish during the Nine Years' War. He was promoted to lieutenant general in 1702, and distinguished himself in the War of the Spanish Succession.

Sheldon was prominent figure at the exiled Stuart court at St Germain. Along with his former comrade from the Irish Army, Richard Hamilton, he was in charge of the military education of the young James Francis Edward Stuart, considered to be James III by the Jacobites. He maintained frequent contact with James' mother Mary of Modena. In 1708 he accompanied James when he sailed with a French expedition in an aborted plan to land in Scotland.

In June 1718 along with other prominent Jacobites such as Lord Middleton and Arthur Dillon he brought news of Mary of Modena's death to her son at his court in Urbino.

== Bibliography ==
- D'Alton, John. King James's Irish Army List. The Celtic Bookshop, 1997.
- Childs, John. The Army, James II and the Glorious Revolution. Manchester University Press, 1980.
- Childs, John. The Williamite Wars in Ireland. Bloomsbury Publishing, 2007.
- Corp, Edward T. A Court in Exile: The Stuarts in France, 1689–1718. Cambridge University Press, 2004.
- Miller, Peggy. James. George Allen & Unwin, 1971.
