= Richard Hamilton (officer) =

Irish soldier and Jacobite (died 1717)

- Born: c. 1649
- Died: December 1717
- Relatives: Sir George Hamilton, 1st Baronet, of Donalong (father); Anthony Hamilton (brother)
- Military career
- Allegiance: French army
- Conflicts: Franco-Dutch War; War of the Reunions
- Military career
- Allegiance: Jacobite army
- Conflicts: Williamite War in Ireland

Richard Hamilton PC (Ire) (c. 1649 – 1717) was an officer in the French and the Irish army. In France he fought in the Franco-Dutch War (1672–1678) under Turenne and in the War of the Reunions (1683–1684) at the Siege of Luxembourg.

In Ireland he fought for James II during the Williamite War, rising to the rank of lieutenant-general. He defeated the Protestants of Ulster at the Break of Dromore and the Cladyford in 1689. Later that year he commanded during part of the Siege of Derry. In 1690 he fought bravely at the Battle of the Boyne, where he was taken prisoner. In 1692 he was exchanged for Lord Mountjoy and joined the exile court at Saint-Germain-en-Laye, France. Hamilton died in French exile.

Family tree

Richard Hamilton with parents and other selected relatives. (Note: This family tree is partly derived from the Abercorn pedigree pictured in Cokayne and written genealogies of the Abercorns.) He never married. His father is sometimes confused with his granduncle, Sir George Hamilton of Greenlaw and Roscrea.

Claud; 1st Ld; Paisley; 1546–1621	Margaret; Seton d. 1616
James; 1st Earl; Abercorn; 1575–1618	Marion; Boyd d. 1632; Recusant	Sir George Hamilton of Greenlaw & Roscrea d. bef. 1657
James; 2nd Earl d. 1670	Sir George Hamilton; 1st Baronet of Donalong c. 1608 – 1679	Mary; Butler d. 1680
James c. 1630 – 1673; Courtier d.v.p.*	Elizabeth; Colepeper d. 1709	Anthony c. 1645 – 1719; Writer	Richard c. 1649 – 1717
James; 6th Earl c. 1661 – 1734	Elizabeth; Reading d. 1754

Legend

XXX	Subject of the article	XXX	Earls of Abercorn

*d.v.p. = predeceased his father (decessit vita patris)

== Birth and origins ==
Richard was born about 1649, (Note: It is known that Richard died in his late 60s in 1717.) in Ireland, before his family fled to France in 1651 during the Cromwellian Conquest. He was the fifth son of Sir George Hamilton and his wife Mary Butler. His father was Scottish, the fourth son of the 1st Earl of Abercorn. His father supported the Marquess of Ormond in the Irish Confederate War and the Cromwellian conquest and was a would-be baronet. (Note: Richard's father's article has more detail about these attempts to become a baronet.)

Richard's mother was half Irish and half English, the third daughter of Thomas, Viscount Thurles, and his English Catholic wife Elizabeth Poyntz. Viscount Thurles (courtesy title) predeceased his father, the 11th Earl of Ormond, and therefore never succeeded to the earldom. The Butlers were Old English. Richard's mother also was a sister of the 1st Duke of Ormond (previously known as the Marquess of Ormond), making her husband a brother-in-law of the Duke.

His place of birth and the date of his parents marriage are affected by errors caused by confusing his father with his granduncle, Sir George Hamilton of Greenlaw and Roscrea. Both are called George, and both married a Mary Butler. Richard's place of birth probably is Nenagh (/ˈniːnæ/), County Tipperary. (Note: Some say it was Roscrea, but this seems to be due to the confusion between his father and his granduncle. The manuscript A Light to the Blind from about 1711 calls Richard "of Nenagh".) Hamilton's parents had married in 1635, despite earlier dates reported in error due to the mistaken identity. (Note: Richard's father's article discusses his mistaken identity.)

Richard was one of nine siblings. See James, George, Elizabeth, Anthony, and John. (Note: Richard's father's article gives a list of all the nine siblings.) Richard's parents were both Catholic, (Note: Richard's father's article has some detail about Anthony's Protestant grandfather, the 1st Earl of Abercorn.) and so was he.

== Irish wars and first French exile ==
Richard's father was a soldier in the Irish army and fought for the royalists under his uncle James Butler, the Earl of Ormond, in the Irish Confederate Wars (1641–1648) and the Cromwellian conquest of Ireland (1649-1653) until early in 1651, when his family followed Ormond into French exile. They went to Caen, Normandy, where they were accommodated for some time by Elizabeth Preston, the Marchioness of Ormond. Lady Ormond with her children left for England in August 1652, whereas Richard's mother moved to Paris, where she lived in the Convent of the Feuillantines.

== Restoration ==
In May 1660 the Restoration brought Charles II on the English throne. Richard's father and his elder sons moved to the court at Whitehall. Charles II restored Donalong, Ulster, to Hamilton's father. About that year Charles allegedly created Hamilton's father baronet of Donalong and Nenagh, but the king, if he really went that far, refused to go further because the family was Catholic.

Richard's elder brothers, James and George, became courtiers at Whitehall. In 1661 the King arranged a Protestant marriage for James. Early in 1661 Richard's father also brought his wife and younger children to London, where they lived for some time all together in a house near Whitehall.

== In French service ==
Wanting to be a soldier and unable to take the oath of supremacy, obligatory in the English army, Richard followed the example of his elder brothers George and Anthony and went into French service. In 1671 he was commissioned into the regiment that George had raised. This regiment fought for France in the Franco-Dutch War (1672–1678). He must have fought with George under Turenne in the battles of Sinsheim in June 1674, and Entzheim in October. At Entzheim his brothers George and Anthony were wounded.

In 1674 Richard visited England with his elder brothers George and Anthony. George returned to France from England, but Anthony and Richard continued to Ireland to recruit for the regiment. The recruits were picked up by French ships at Kinsale in April after a missed appointment at Dingle in March. Richard's voyage caused him to miss Turenne's winter campaign in which the French marched south and surprised the Germans in upper Alsace, beating them at Turckheim in January 1675.

In July 1675 Hamilton's regiment was at Sasbach, where George witnessed Turenne's death. At the retreat from Sasbach in August, the regiment suffered 450 casualties in the rearguard actions of the Battle of Altenheim. Louis XIV called in Condé, who stopped the German advance but retired at the end of the campaign. In the winter 1675–76 George, accompanied by either Richard or Anthony, again went recruiting and visited Lady Arran, wife of Richard Butler, 1st Earl of Arran, in January 1676. She called them "ye monsieurs". The regiment quartered that winter in Toul.

Luxembourg commanded on the Rhine in the campaign of 1676. In June George was killed in a rearguard action at the Zaberner Steige (Col de Saverne), where imperial troops under the Duke of Lorraine pursued the French who were retreating eastward to Zabern (Saverne) in lower Alsace. Thomas Dongan became colonel and Richard lieutenant-colonel. In 1678 Richard succeeded Thomas Dongan as the regiment's colonel. In August the Peace of Nijmegen ended the Franco-Dutch War. The regiment was disbanded in December. Richard joined a French regiment that he commanded for over six years. This seems to have been the Roussillon Regiment, according to a remark in a letter from Louvois to Avaux.

Either Richard or Anthony played a zephyr in the performance of Quinault's ballet the Triomphe de l'Amour, to music by Lully, on 21 January 1681 at the Château de Saint-Germain-en-Laye before Louis XIV. In the War of the Reunions (1683–1684), Richard commanded the Altmünster sector in the Siege of Luxembourg in 1684 under Maréchal de Créquy.

In March 1685 Hamilton was obliged to leave France after a bitter disagreement with Louvois, the minister of war, over the state of his regiment and a brawl with the Marquis d'Alincourt over the Princess de Conti, Louis XIV's recently widowed daughter. Having sold his regiment a few days before, Hamilton took leave of the king on 16 March and left for England.

== In Irish service ==
Hamilton left France and went to England, where James II on 20 June 1685 made him a colonel of a regiment of dragoons of the Irish Army. He was promoted brigadier in April 1686, making him the third most senior officer of the Irish Army after Tyrconnell and Justin McCarthy, Viscount Mountcashel. In May 1686 he was appointed to the privy council of Ireland. In February 1687 he accompanied Tyrconnell to Dublin to take office as lord lieutenant of Ireland.

He went to England with the Irish troops that Richard Talbot, 1st Earl of Tyrconnell, viceroy (Lord Lieutenant) of Ireland, sent to help James when the king's position became precarious in the build-up to the Glorious Revolution and was promoted to major-general on 12 November 1688. These troops should have helped to defend the English south against the imminent Dutch invasion. They caused the Irish Fright in December 1688. They surrendered to the Prince of Orange and were disbanded after James's flight. Richard Hamilton was jailed at the Tower of London.

William, the Prince of Orange, wanted to bring Ireland around to his side by proposing favourable terms to Tyrconnell. He thought to have found a suitable messenger in Hamilton. He freed him from the Tower and sent him to Ireland on parole. Hamilton landed at Ringsend in January 1689 and met Tyrconnell in Dublin. However, instead of trying to convince the viceroy to accept William's offer, Hamilton urged Tyrconnell to reject William's terms. A later investigation into his hehaviour found a witness who had observed Hamilton in a tavern in Ringsend near Dublin just after Hamilton had landed in Ireland. This witness reported that Hamilton had laughed loudly and had boasted how well he had deceived the Prince of Orange.

Tyrconnell promoted him to lieutenant-general. Early in March 1689 Tyrconnel sent him to Ulster at the head of a force of 2500 to put down the Protestant rebellion there. Dominic Sheldon commanded his cavalry. Hamilton routed Sir Arthur Rawdon's Protestant Army of the North in the battle called the Break of Dromore on 14 March 1689 in County Down and then moved northwards into County Antrim where he raided Antrim Castle and took Viscount Massereene's silverware and furniture worth £3000.

Hamilton then continued to Coleraine, which he reached on 27 March. In the meantime James II had landed in Ireland (on 12 March) and had sent Lieutenant-General Rosen, the French commander-in-chief, up north with an army. The two armies linked up near Strabane on the march to Derry. The commanders were both lieutenant-generals, but Rosen had been appointed Marshal of Ireland for the duration of the campaign. Nevertheless, Hamilton refused to submit to Rosen.

Lundy, the governor of Derry for William, tried to defend the so-called fords along the River Finn south of the city. On 15 April 1689 Hamilton attacked at Clady. The Duke of Berwick was with him. Rosen broke through the enemy's line of defence in a separate action near Lifford. Lundy fled to the city.

The siege of the town began on 18 April. James and Rosen returned to Dublin and left Lieutenant-General Jacques de Fontanges, comte de Maumont, in command. However, Maumont was killed in a sally on 21 April, and the command devolved to Hamilton. Rosen was sent back to Derry to take over from Hamilton in June. The siege was finally abandoned after 105 days on 31 July 1689. Hamilton retreated with the army southwards.

At the Battle of the Boyne, in July 1690, Hamilton commanded the centre of the Irish army, defending the ford at Oldbridge. Later in the battle he commanded the rearguard and led cavalry charges that delayed the pursuite. In the last of those he was wounded and taken prisoner. He was interrogated by William, who asked him whether his men would continue to fight. Hamilton answered "On my honour, Sir, I believe that they will". Thereupon William twice muttered "Your honour!", reminding him of his broken parole. Hamilton was detained as a prisoner of war for about two years, first in Dublin, then at Chester Castle, and at last at the Tower of London.

== Last French exile ==
In April 1692 Hamilton was freed by being exchanged for Lord Mountjoy. He left for France where he went to Versailles to thank Louis XIV for his liberation.

He took service in King James's exile army. In 1692 he served as lieutenant-general under Marshal Bellefonds in the forces that assembled at Saint-Vaast-la-Hougue and should have been carried over the Channel by the French Fleet to land on the Isle of Portland and march on London from there. However, that fleet was intercepted by the English and Dutch and defeated in several actions at Barfleur and La Hougue in May, after which the invasion had to be cancelled.

In 1696 he became James's master of the robes in addition to lieutenant-general. He lost his command when King James's force was dissolved after the Treaty of Ryswick in 1697, in which France recognised William III as the rightful King of England. James II died in 1701 at the Château de Saint-Germain-en-Laye and was succeeded by his son James Francis Edward Stuart, called James III or the Old Pretender. Louis XIV recognised him as James III of England.

In March 1708, during the War of the Spanish Succession (1701–1714), Hamilton was involved in an attempt to invade Scotland led by James III. He was among the about 6000 troops that were assembled at Dunkirk and which comprised six French regiments and the Irish Brigade. These troops were transported by a French fleet commanded by Admiral Claude de Forbin and consisting of 5 men-of-war, two transports and 20 frigates, many of which were Dunkirk privateers. They sailed from Dunkirk up to the Firth of Forth intending to land near Edinburgh, but a stronger British fleet under Admiral George Byng caught up with them. They had to abandon the landing, but Forbin outmaneuvered the British, escaped northwards, and brought the invasion force safely back to Dunkirk by sailing around Scotland and Ireland.

In 1713, Hamilton was implicated in a scandal in which he had plotted to usurp Lord Middleton's position as James's secretary of state. He was chased from James III's court and went to live with his niece Marie-Elisabeth de Gramont, daughter of his sister Elizabeth, Countess de Gramont, at Poussay in the Duchy of Lorraine, at that time still part of the Empire. Marie-Elisabeth was a canoness of the Chapter of Poussay, where she had been elected abbess in 1695. He died in Poussay in December 1717.

Timeline
As his birth date is uncertain, so are all his ages. Italics for historical background.
Age	Date	Event
0	Estimated 1649	Born, probably at Nenagh in Ireland
10–11	29 May 1660	Restoration of Charles II
10–11	1660	Returned from France to England with his family
24–25	6 Jun 1674	Fought together with George at Sinsheim
24–25	6 Oct 1674	Brothers George and Anthony wounded at the Battle of Entzheim
25–26	1675	Went to Ireland with Anthony to recruit.
26–27	Jun 1676	Brother George killed at the Col de Saverne
34–35	26 Jan 1679	Treaties of Nijmegen ended the Franco-Dutch War between France and the Empire.
29–30	1679	Father died
34–35	1684	Fought at the siege of Luxembourg
35–36	6 Feb 1685	Accession of James II, succeeding King Charles II
35–36	Mar 1685	Obliged to leave France
39–40	Jan 1689	Returned to Ireland and joined the Jacobites
39–40	13 Feb 1689	Accession of William and Mary, succeeding James II
39–40	14 Mar 1689	Defeated Protestants at the Break of Dromore
39–40	15 Apr 1689	Forced the crossing of the River Finn at Clady
39–40	18 Apr 1689	Fought at the siege of Derry under Maumont
39–40	21 Apr 1689	Became commander-in-chief before Derry
39–40	31 Jul 1689	Retreated southwards as the siege of Derry is abandoned.
40–41	1 Jul 1690	Taken prisoner at the Battle of the Boyne
42–43	Apr 1692	Exchanged for Mountjoy
42–43	1692	Ready to embark at Saint-Vaast-la-Hougue for an aborted invasion of southern England
46–47	1696	Appointed James's master of the robes.
58–59	Mar 1708	Sailed to the Firth of Forth with Forbin in an aborted invasion of Scotland
63–64	1713	Tried to usurp Middleton's position and is chased from the court
67–68	Dec 1717	Died at Poussay, Lorraine

== Notes and references ==
=== Sources ===
Subject matter monographs:

- Click here. Chichester 1890 in Dictionary of National Biography
- Click here. Ó Ciardha 2009 in Dictionary of Irish Biography
- Click here. Wauchope 2004 in Oxford Dictionary of National Biography
- Atkinson, C. T. (1946). "Charles II's regiments in France, 1672–1678: Part III". Journal of the Society for Army Historical Research. 24 (100): 161–172. JSTOR 44228420. – Altenheim
- Berwick (1778). Mémoires du Maréchal de Berwick [Memoirs of Marshal Berwick] (in French). Vol. Tome premier. Paris: Moutard. OCLC 1049657563.
- Bouillet, Jean-Baptiste (1848). Nobiliaire d'Auvergne (in French). Vol. III. Clermont-Ferrand: Pérol. OCLC 422187531. – F to L (for Fontanges, comte de Maumont)
- Boulger, Demetrius Charles (1911). The Battle of the Boyne. London: Martin Secker. OCLC 1041056932.
- Burke, Bernard; Burke, Ashworth Peter (1915). A Genealogical and Heraldic History of the Peerage and Baronetage, the Privy Council, Knightage and Companionage (77th ed.). London: Harrison. OCLC 1155471554.
- Chichester, Henry Manners (1890). "Hamilton, Richard (fl. 1688)". In Lee, Sidney (ed.). Dictionary of National Biography. Vol. XXIV. New York: MacMillan and Co. pp. 203–204. OCLC 8544105.
- Childs, John (1987). The British Army of William III 1689–1702. Manchester: Manchester University Press. ISBN 0-7190-1987-7. – (Preview)
- Chisholm, Hugh, ed. (1910b). "Hamilton, Anthony" . Encyclopædia Britannica. Vol. 12 (11th ed.). Cambridge University Press. p. 884.
- Clark, Ruth (1921). Anthony Hamilton: his Life and Works and his Family. London: John Lane. OCLC 459281163.
- Corp, Edward (2004). "Hamilton, Anthony [Antoine], Count Hamilton in the French nobility (1644/5?–1719)". In Matthew, Colin; Harrison, Brian (eds.). Oxford Dictionary of National Biography. Vol. 24. New York: Oxford University Press. pp. 766–768. ISBN 0-19-861374-1.
- Courcelles (1823). Dictionnaire historique et biographique des généraux français [Historic and Biographic Dictionary of French Generals] (in French). Vol. Tome huitième. Paris: chez l'auteur. – Monteq to Riva
- Dangeau (1854a). Conches, Feuillet de (ed.). Journal du marquis de Dangeau [Diary of the Marquess of Dangeau] (in French). Vol. Tome Premier. Paris: Firmin Didot Frères. OCLC 310446765. – 1684 to 1686
- Dangeau (1854b). Conches, Feuillet de (ed.). Journal du marquis de Dangeau [Diary of the Marquess of Dangeau] (in French). Vol. Tome Troisième. Paris: Firmin Didot Frères. OCLC 310446765. – 1689 to 1691
- Dangeau (1855). Conches, Feuillet de (ed.). Journal du marquis de Dangeau [Diary of the Marquess of Dangeau] (in French). Vol. Tome Quatrième. Paris: Firmin Didot Frères. OCLC 310446765. – 1692 to 1694
- Dangeau (1859). Conches, Feuillet de (ed.). Journal du marquis de Dangeau [Diary of the Marquess of Dangeau] (in French). Vol. Tome Dix-septième. Paris: Firmin Didot Frères. OCLC 310446765. – 1717 to 1719
- Doherty, Richard (2008). The Siege of Derry 1689 – The Military History. Stroud, Gloucestershire, England: Spellmount. ISBN 978-1-86227-454-9. – (Snippet view)
- Dulon, J. (1897). Jacques II Stuart, sa Famille et le Jacobites à Saint-Germain-en-Laye [James II Stuart, his Family and the Jacobites at Saint-Germain-en-Laye] (in French). Saint-Germain-en-Laye: Ch. Lévêque. OCLC 313394287.
- Elliott, Marianne (2000). The Catholics of Ulster, a History. London: Allen Lane The Penguin Press. ISBN 0-713-99464-9.
- Ellis, Peter Berresford (1978). The Boyne Water: the Battle of the Boyne, 1690. Belfast: The Blackstaff Press. ISBN 0-85640-419-5.
- FitzGerald, Rev. Patrick (1827). The History, Topography, and Antiquities of the County and City of Limerick. Vol. II. Limerick: George McKern. OCLC 966368368.
- Fryde, E. B.; Greenway, D. E.; Porter, S.; Roy, I., eds. (1986). Handbook of British Chronology. Royal Historical Society Guides and Handbooks, No. 2 (3rd ed.). London: Offices of the Royal Historical Society. ISBN 0-86193-106-8. – (for timeline)
- Gaspard, Émile (1871). Abbaye et Chapitre de Poussay (in French). Nancy: Crépin-Leblond. OCLC 494290851.
- G. E. C. (1889). Complete Peerage of England, Scotland, Ireland, Great Britain and the United Kingdom, Extant, Extinct, or Dormant. Vol. II (1st ed.). London: George Bell and Sons. – Bra to C (for Butler)
- G. E. C. (1895). Complete Peerage of England, Scotland, Ireland, Great Britain and the United Kingdom, Extant, Extinct, or Dormant. Vol. VI (1st ed.). London: George Bell and Sons. OCLC 1180818801. – N to R (for Ormond)
- G. E. C. (1903). Complete Baronetage, 1611 to 1800. Vol. III (1st ed.). Exeter: William Pollard & Co. OCLC 866278985. – 1649 to 1664
- G. E. C. (1910). Gibbs, Vicary (ed.). The Complete Peerage of England, Scotland, Ireland, Great Britain and the United Kingdom, Extant, Extinct, or Dormant. Vol. I (2nd ed.). London: The St Catherine Press. OCLC 1042385438. – Ab-Adam to Basing
- Gilbert, John T., ed. (1971) [1892]. A Jacobite Narrative of the War in Ireland 1688–1691. Shannon: Irish University Press. – Also known as A Light to the Blind
- Historical Manuscripts Commission (1889). Taylor, Edward Fairfax; Skene, Felix (eds.). The Manuscripts of the House of Lords, 1689—1690. London: Eyre and Spottiswoode.
- Historical Manuscripts Commission (1906). Calendar of the Manuscripts of the Marquess of Ormonde K.P. Preserved at Kilkenny Castle. New Series. Vol. IV. London: His/Her Majesty's Stationery Office. OCLC 460421809.
- La Fayette (1731). Mémoires de la cour de France pour les années 1688 et 1689 (in French). Amsterdam: Jean Frédéric Bernard. OCLC 1327616572.
- Longueville, Thomas (1907). Marshal Turenne. London: Longmans, Green & Co. OCLC 665146146.
- Luttrell, Narcissus (1857). A Brief Historical Relation of State Affairs from September 1678 to April 1714. Vol. VI. Oxford: Oxford University Press. – 1705 to 1714
- Lynn, John A. (1999). The Wars of Louis XIV 1667–1714. Harlow, England: Longman. ISBN 978-0-582-05629-9.
- Macaulay, Thomas Babington (1855). The History of England from the Accession of James the Second. Vol. III. London: Longman Brown Greens & Longmans. OCLC 1046525672. – 1689 to 1690
- Mahaffy, Robert Pentland, ed. (1900). Calendar of the State Papers Relating to Ireland, of the Reign of Charles I. 1633–1647. London: His/Her Majesty's Stationery Office.
- Manning, Conleth (2001). "The Two Sir George Hamiltons and their Connections with the Castles of Roscrea and Nenagh" (PDF). Tipperary Historical Journal: 149–154.
- Merriam-Webster (1997). Merriam-Webster's Geographical Dictionary (Third ed.). Springfield, Massachusetts: Merriam-Webster. ISBN 0-87779-546-0. – (for place name pronunciation)
- Millar, Alexander Hastie (1890). "Hamilton, James, first Earl of Abercorn (d.1617)". In Lee, Sidney (ed.). Dictionary of National Biography. Vol. XXIV. New York: MacMillan and Co. pp. 176–177. OCLC 8544105.
- Ó Ciardha, Éamonn (October 2009). "Hamilton, Richard". In McGuire, James; Quinn, James (eds.). Dictionary of Irish Biography (online ed.).
- O'Laverty, James (1884). An historical account of the diocese of Down and Connor, ancient and modern. Vol. III. Dublin: James Duffy & Sons. OCLC 56034696.
- Parfaict, Claude (1756). Dictionnaire des théatres de Paris (in French). Paris: Rozet. OCLC 614861119.
- Paul, Sir James Balfour (1904). The Scots Peerage, Founded on Wood's Edition of Sir Robert Douglas's Peerage of Scotland. Vol. I. Edinburgh: David Douglas. OCLC 505064285. – Abercorn to Balmerino
- Perceval-Maxwell, Michael (2004). "Butler [née Preston] Elizabeth, duchess of Ormond and suo jure Lady Dingwall (1615–1684)". In Matthew, Henry Colin Gray.; Harrison, Brian (eds.). Oxford Dictionary of National Biography. Vol. 9. New York: Oxford University Press. pp. 130–131. ISBN 0-19-861359-8.
- Rigg, James McMullen (1890). "Hamilton, Anthony (1646?–1720)". In Lee, Sidney (ed.). Dictionary of National Biography. Vol. XXIV. New York: MacMillan and Co. pp. 135–137. OCLC 8544105.
- Saint-Simon (1921). Boislisle, Arthur de (ed.). Mémoires du duc de Saint-Simon [Memoirs of the Duke of Saint-Simon] (in French). Vol. Tome trente et deuxième. Paris: Hachette. OCLC 1068033585. – Later parts of 1717
- Sergeant, Philip Walsingham (1913). Little Jennings and Fighting Dick Talbot: A Life of the Duke and Duchess of Tyrconnel. Vol. I. London: Hutchinson. OCLC 474495830. – 1643 to 1685
- Story, George (1693). An Impartial History of the Wars of Ireland. London: Richard Chiswell. OCLC 858717314.
- Walker, Rev. George (1893). Dwyer, Rev. Philip (ed.). The siege of Londonderry in 1689, as set forth in the Literary Remains of Colonel the Rev. George Walker, D.D. London: Robert Clavel & Ralph Simpson. OCLC 79434854.
- Wasser, Michael (2004). "Hamilton, James, first earl of Abercorn (1575–1618)". In Matthew, Colin; Harrison, Brian (eds.). Oxford Dictionary of National Biography. Vol. 24. New York: Oxford University Press. pp. 837–838. ISBN 0-19-861374-1.
- Wauchope, Piers (2004). "Hamilton, Richard (d. 1717)". In Matthew, Colin; Harrison, Brian (eds.). Oxford Dictionary of National Biography. Vol. 24. New York: Oxford University Press. pp. 888–889, right column. ISBN 0-19-861374-1.

Military offices
Preceded by The Lord Langdale	Colonel of Hamilton's Regiment of Horse; 1687–1688	Succeeded by John Coy
