= Army of the North (Ireland) =

Army raised in Ireland in 1689

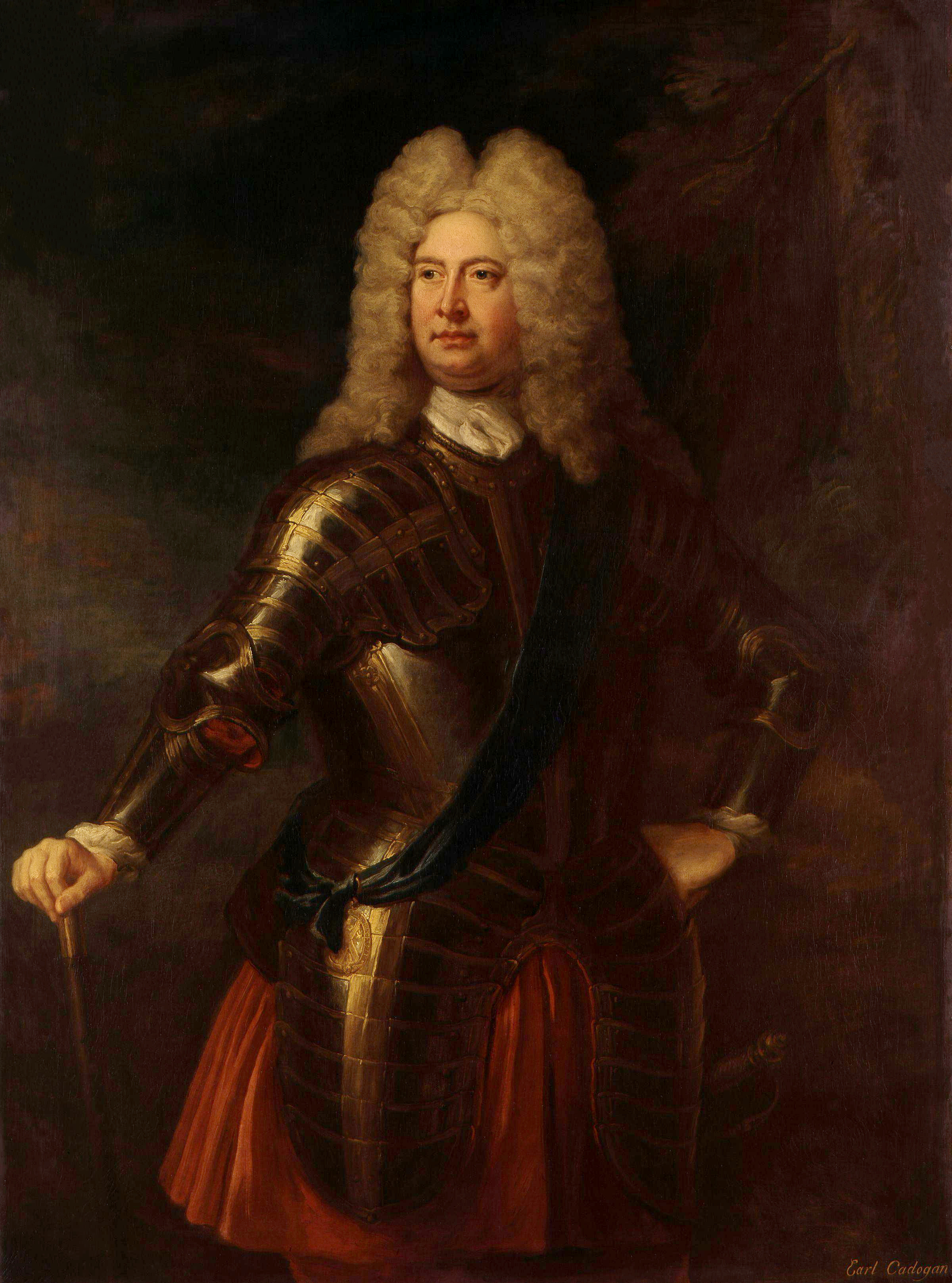
William Cadogan, who served in the Army of the North as a cornet of dragoons

The Army of the North was an army raised in Ireland in early 1689 during the Williamite War in Ireland. It comprised Irish Protestants from Ulster who declared their opposition to the rule of the Catholic James II and as Williamites supported William III and the Glorious Revolution. The army was raised in opposition to the Royal Irish Army, which had been purged of Protestant officers and other ranks by Catholics. Organised by prominent local leaders such as Sir Arthur Rawdon, the Army of the North was placed under the control of the General Council of Union, also known as the Council of Five.

Leaders of the Army of the North dispatched emissaries to London and received endorsement for their actions from William III. After it had received news of the Army of the North's raising, the Dublin Castle administration despatched a force of Irish Army troops under Richard Hamilton northwards to engage the Protestant army. Hamilton's force inflicted several major defeats on the Army of the North, including the Break of Dromore on 14 March and Battle of Cladyford on 15 April, causing the army to disperse. Some veterans took shelter in Derry, which still held out, and took part in the successful defence of the city from April to August.

== Bibliography ==
- Childs, John. The Williamite Wars in Ireland. Bloomsbury Publishing, 2007.
