= John Hamilton (Jacobite) =

Irish army officer (died 1691)

- Born: Probably 1651 or 1652; Caen, France
- Died: 12 July 1691; Dublin
- Relatives: Richard, Anthony (brothers)
- Military career
- Allegiance: Kingdom of Ireland
- Branch: Infantry
- Service years: c. 1680 – 1691
- Rank: Major General
- Conflicts: Williamite War in Ireland: Battle of the Boyne; Siege of Athlone; Battle of Aughrim

John Hamilton (1651 or 1652 – 1691) was an Irish army officer of Scottish and Irish origin, who fought in the Williamite war in Ireland on the side of the deposed James II. He died from wounds received at the Battle of Aughrim.

Family tree

John Hamilton with wife, parents, and other selected relatives. (Note: This family tree is derived from the Abercorn pedigree pictured in Cokayne and written genealogies of the Abercorns.) Earls 3 to 5 are omitted. Earl 3 descends from Earl 2. Earls 4 & 5 descend from Claud Hamilton of Strabane.

James; 1st Earl; 1575–1618	Marion; Boyd d. 1632; Recusant
James; 2nd Earl d. 1670	Claud; 2nd Baron; Strabane d. 1638	George; 1st Baronet; Donalong c. 1608 – 1679	Mary; Butler d. 1680
James c. 1630 – 1673; Courtier d.v.p.*	Richard c. 1655 – 1717; Jacobite	John d. 1691	Elizabeth; Macan
James; 6th Earl c. 1661 – 1734	Margaret

Legend

XXX	John; Hamilton	XXX	Earls of Abercorn

*d.v.p. = predeceased his father (decessit vita patris)

== Birth and origins ==
John Hamilton was probably born in 1651 or 1652 (Note: His most likely birth date is constrained by his parents arrival in France, early in 1651, and his mother's age who had married in 1635.) in Caen, France, the sixth and youngest son of George Hamilton and his wife, Mary Butler. His family had fled Ireland early in 1651 during the Cromwellian conquest.

His father was Scottish, the fourth son of James Hamilton, 1st Earl of Abercorn, a faithful supporter of James Butler, Marquess of Ormond and lord lieutenant of Ireland, during the Irish Confederate Wars and the Cromwellian conquest of Ireland, and a would-be baronet. (Note: John's father's article has more detail about these attempts to become a baronet.)

John's mother was half Irish and half English, the third daughter of Thomas Butler, Viscount Thurles and his English Catholic wife Elizabeth Poyntz. Viscount Thurles (courtesy title) predeceased his father, Walter Butler, 11th Earl of Ormond, and therefore never succeeded to the earldom. The Butlers were Old English. John's mother also was a sister of James Butler, making her husband a brother-in-law of the lord lieutenant.

Hamilton's parents had married in 1635, despite earlier dates reported in error due to his father being often mistaken for his homonymous granduncle. (Note: John's father's article discusses his mistaken identity.) John was one of nine siblings. See James, George, Elizabeth, Anthony, and Richard. (Note: John's father's article gives a list of all nine siblings.) John's parents were both Catholic, (Note: Anthony's father's article has some detail about Anthony's Protestant grandfather, the 1st Earl of Abercorn.) and so was he.

== French childhood ==
His father had been receiver general for James Butler, 1st Marquess of Ormond the Lord Lieutenant of Ireland during the Cromwellian conquest of Ireland. Ormond left Ireland for France in December 1650. Hamilton's father wanted to leave together with him but was accused of fraud by the clerical faction. Found innocent, Hamilton's father, accompanied by his family, left Ireland in spring 1651. They went to Caen, Normandy, where they were accommodated for some time by his mother's sister Elizabeth Preston, the Marchioness of Ormond. That is where John was probably born. Lady Ormond with her children left for England in August 1652, whereas John's mother moved to Paris where she lived in the Convent of the Feuillantines.

== Restoration ==
The Restoration in May 1660 brought Charles II on the English throne. Hamilton's father and his elder brothers moved to the court at Whitehall. Charles II restored Donalong, Ulster, to Hamilton's father. About that year Charles allegedly created Hamilton's father baronet of Donalong and Nenagh, but the king if he really went that far, refused to go further because the family was Catholic.

John's elder brothers, James and George, became courtiers at Whitehall. Early in 1661 their father also brought his wife and his younger children to London, where they lived for some time all together in a house near Whitehall.

== James II ==
In February 1685 the Catholic James II acceded to the English throne. Hamilton now in his early thirties, became an officer in James II's Royal Irish Army, as did his older brothers Anthony and Richard. This seems to have been Hamilton's first military employment as he seems to have never joined his brothers at Hamilton's regiment in France. However, Walter Scott believed that he served in France with his brothers.

Having stayed in Ireland he was not affected by the 1688 Glorious Revolution. Early 1689 he was sent to France to prepare James's expedition to Ireland. Hamilton arrived on 5 February 1689 in France and departed on the 17th with all the officers and soldiers (including his brother Anthony) from Saint-Germain. He landed with James II at Kinsale on 12 March 1689, having sailed from Brest on the ship-of-the-line Entreprenant.

== Marriage and daughter ==
In 1690, already approaching his forties, Hamilton married Elizabeth Maccan (or, likely, McCann) of the family of the ancient Irish Lords of Clanbrassil, different from the viscounts and earls of Clanbrassill, who were Hamiltons from Scotland.

John and Elizabeth had a daughter:

- Margaret (1691-1765), who married in France, firstly in 1715 Pierre, Comte de Réance (+ 1717) and secondly François Philippe, Comte de Marmier (1681-1736). Their great-grandson, Philippe Gabriel, was made Duke of Marmier in 1839.

== Williamite war, death, and timeline ==
By June 1690 he was ranked brigadier. In July he as well as his elder brothers Anthony and Richard fought at the Battle of the Boyne. He was listed as one of the "directors" left in Ireland by Tyrconnell when the latter travelled to France following the defeat at the Boyne.

In 1690 Hamilton fought in the successful defence of Limerick. This was the first siege of the town during this war in which William had to concede defeat after a costly failed attack and when winter approached early.

During the campaign of 1691 in Ireland, Hamilton was involved in the Siege of Athlone, where he attempted to retake the city with two infantry brigades but failed.

On 12 July 1691 at the Battle of Aughrim, he commanded the second line of infantry. Seriously wounded, he was taken prisoner late in the day and died in Dublin shortly afterwards. His wife and daughter went to James II's court in exile at Saint-Germain-en-Laye.

Timeline
As his birth date is uncertain, so are all his ages. Italics for historical background.
Age	Date	Event
0	Estimated 1651	Born, probably in Caen, France
8–9	29 May 1660	Restoration of Charles II
9–10	Early in 1661	Brought to London by his mother
27–28	1679	Father died.
33–34	6 Feb 1685	Accession of James II, succeeding Charles II
35–36	8 Jan 1687	Richard Talbot, 1st Earl of Tyrconnell, appointed Lord Deputy of Ireland
37–38	12 Mar 1689	Landed with James II in Ireland
38–39	1690	Married Elizabeth Macan
39–40	July 1691	Died in Dublin from wounds received at the Battle of Aughrim on 12 July

== Notes and references ==
=== Sources ===
- Barnard, Toby (2004). "Butler, James, first duke of Ormond (1610–1688)". In Matthew, Henry Colin Gray.; Harrison, Brian (eds.). Oxford Dictionary of National Biography. Vol. 9. New York: Oxford University Press. pp. 153–163. ISBN 0-19-861359-8.
- Boisseleau, Alexandre de Rainier de Droue, Marquis de (1884). "Siège de Limerick". In Sourches, Louis François de Bouchet, Marquis de; Cosnac, Gabriel-Jules, comte de; Pontal, Edouard (eds.). Mémoires du marquis de Sourches sur le règne de Louis XIV [Memoirs of the Marquess of Sourches on the Reign of Louis XIV] (in French). Vol. Tome troisième. Paris: Hachette. pp. 512–517. OCLC 697992485.
- Boulger, Demetrius Charles (1911). The Battle of the Boyne. London: Martin Secker. OCLC 1041056932.
- Boyle, John (1879) [1st pub. 1867]. The Battle-fields of Ireland, from 1688 to 1691 (Fourth ed.). New York: Robert Coddington.
- Burke, Bernard; Burke, Ashworth Peter (1915). A Genealogical and Heraldic History of the Peerage and Baronetage, the Privy Council, Knightage and Companionage (77th ed.). London: Harrison. OCLC 1155471554.
- Chisholm, Hugh, ed. (1910b). "Hamilton, Anthony" . Encyclopædia Britannica. Vol. 12 (11th ed.). Cambridge University Press. p. 884.
- Clark, Ruth (1921). Anthony Hamilton: his Life and Works and his Family. London: John Lane. OCLC 459281163.
- Dangeau (1854). Conches, Feuillet de (ed.). Journal du marquis de Dangeau [Diary of the Marquess of Dangeau] (in French). Vol. Tome Deuxième. Paris: Firmin Didot Frères. OCLC 310446765. – 1687 to 1689
- Doherty, Richard (1998). The Williamite War in Ireland. Dublin: Four Courts. ISBN 1-85182-375-1.
- Elliott, Marianne (2000). The Catholics of Ulster, a History. London: Allen Lane The Penguin Press. ISBN 0-713-99464-9.
- Ellis, Peter Berresford (1978). The Boyne Water: the Battle of the Boyne, 1690. Belfast: The Blackstaff Press. ISBN 0-85640-419-5.
- Fryde, E. B.; Greenway, D. E.; Porter, S.; Roy, I., eds. (1986). Handbook of British Chronology. Royal Historical Society Guides and Handbooks, No. 2 (3rd ed.). London: Offices of the Royal Historical Society. ISBN 0-86193-106-8. – (for timeline)
- G. E. C. (1889). Complete Peerage of England, Scotland, Ireland, Great Britain and the United Kingdom, Extant, Extinct, or Dormant. Vol. II (1st ed.). London: George Bell and Sons. – Bra to C (for Butler)
- G. E. C. (1895). Complete Peerage of England, Scotland, Ireland, Great Britain and the United Kingdom, Extant, Extinct, or Dormant. Vol. VI (1st ed.). London: George Bell and Sons. OCLC 1180818801. – N to R (for Ormond)
- G. E. C. (1903). Complete Baronetage, 1611 to 1800. Vol. III (1st ed.). Exeter: William Pollard & Co. OCLC 866278985. – 1649 to 1664
- G. E. C. (1910). Gibbs, Vicary (ed.). The Complete Peerage of England, Scotland, Ireland, Great Britain and the United Kingdom, Extant, Extinct, or Dormant. Vol. I (2nd ed.). London: The St Catherine Press. OCLC 1042385438. – Ab-Adam to Basing
- Hayes-McCoy, G. A. (1990) [1st pub. 1969]. Irish Battles: A Military History of Ireland. Belfast: The Appletree Press. ISBN 0-86281-250-X.
- Mahaffy, Robert Pentland, ed. (1900). Calendar of the State Papers Relating to Ireland, of the Reign of Charles I. 1633–1647. London: His/Her Majesty's Stationery Office.
- Manning, Conleth (2001). "The Two Sir George Hamiltons and their Connections with the Castles of Roscrea and Nenagh" (PDF). Tipperary Historical Journal: 149–154.
- Millar, Alexander Hastie (1890). "Hamilton, James, first Earl of Abercorn (d.1617)". In Lee, Sidney (ed.). Dictionary of National Biography. Vol. XXIV. New York: MacMillan and Co. pp. 176–177. OCLC 8544105.
- O'Hart, John (1892). Irish Pedigrees: Or, the Origin and Stem of the Irish Nation. Vol. I (5th ed.). Dublin: James Duffy & Co. OCLC 7239210. – Irish stem
- Paul, Sir James Balfour (1904). The Scots Peerage, Founded on Wood's Edition of Sir Robert Douglas's Peerage of Scotland. Vol. I. Edinburgh: David Douglas. OCLC 505064285. – Abercorn to Balmerino
- Perceval-Maxwell, Michael (2004). "Butler [née Preston] Elizabeth, duchess of Ormond and suo jure Lady Dingwall (1615–1684)". In Matthew, Henry Colin Gray.; Harrison, Brian (eds.). Oxford Dictionary of National Biography. Vol. 9. New York: Oxford University Press. pp. 130–131. ISBN 0-19-861359-8.
- O'Sullivan, Mary Donovan (1983) [1st pub. 1942]. Old Galloway: the history of a Norman colony in Ireland. Galway: Kennys Bookshops and Art Galleries. ISBN 978-0-906312-21-6.
- Rigg, James McMullen (1890). "Hamilton, Anthony (1646?–1720)". In Lee, Sidney (ed.). Dictionary of National Biography. Vol. XXIV. New York: MacMillan and Co. pp. 135–137. OCLC 8544105.
- Scott, Sir Walter (1846). "Biographical Sketch of Anthony Hamilton". Memoirs of Court of Charles the Second by Count Grammont. London: Henry George Bohn. pp. 3–17. OCLC 870885892.
- Wasser, Michael (2004). "Hamilton, James, first earl of Abercorn (1575–1618)". In Matthew, Colin; Harrison, Brian (eds.). Oxford Dictionary of National Biography. Vol. 24. New York: Oxford University Press. pp. 837–838. ISBN 0-19-861374-1.
- Wauchope, Piers (2004). "Hamilton, Richard (d. 1717)". In Matthew, Colin; Harrison, Brian (eds.). Oxford Dictionary of National Biography. Vol. 24. New York: Oxford University Press. pp. 888–889. ISBN 0-19-861374-1.
