= Sir George Rawdon, 1st Baronet =

English army officer and politician

Sir George Rawdon, 1st Baronet (1604–1684), of Moira, County Down, was an English army officer and politician. He fought under General Monck in the Irish Rebellion of 1641, served in Ireland for the Commonwealth, and in 1659-60 cooperated with Monck as a royal commissioner in the restoration of Charles II.

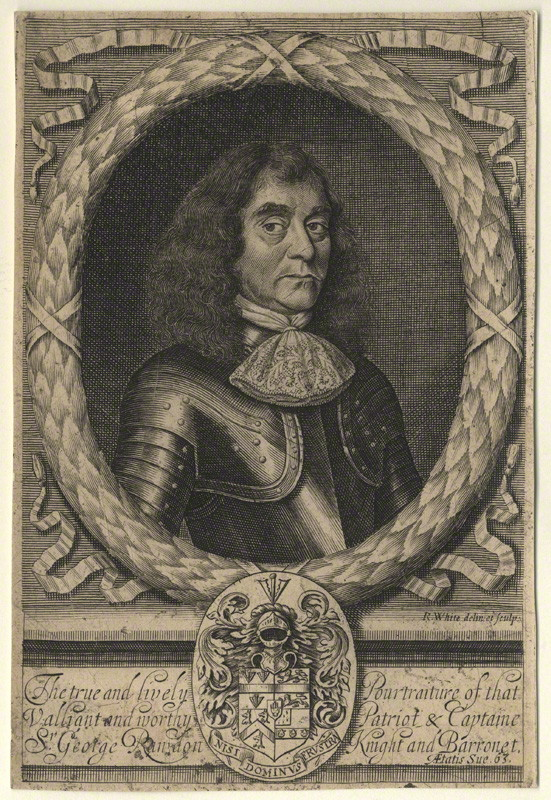
Sir George Rawdon

== Early life ==
Born in November 1604, he was the only son of Francis Rawdon (1581?–1668) of Rawdon Hall, near Leeds. His mother, Dorothy, daughter of William Aldborough, was married in 1603 and died in 1660. He went to court about 1625, and became private secretary to Edward Conway, 1st Viscount Conway, the Secretary of State. In 1625 he was sent to The Hague on business connected with Charles's promised subsidy to Protestant allies. After Conway's death, in 1631, Rawdon was attached to his son Edward Conway, 2nd Viscount Conway, who had a large estate in County Down. Acting as Lord Conway's secretary or agent, Rawdon generally lived in his London house, near St. Martin's-in-the-Fields, but paid frequent visits to his employer's country seats and to his Irish property. On the Down estate, he built a manor house in Lisburn, commanded there a company of soldiers, and laid out what remain the principal streets of the present city. He sat in the Irish parliament of 1639 as a member in the Chichester interest for the neighboring borough of Belfast.

== At war ==
When the Irish Rebellion of 1641 broke out on 23 October 1641, Rawdon was in London. He posted to Scotland, crossed to Bangor, and reached Lisburn on 27 November. He found the town held by Sir Arthur Tyringham, with Lord Conway's troop and some badly armed levies. Sir Phelim O'Neill attacked the next morning, but was twice beaten off. In their retreat, the Irish burned Brookhill with Conway's library in it and property belonging to Rawdon, who was wounded and had a horse shot under him. Rawdon was one of those to whom Sir Phelim some weeks later wrote letters with the signature "Tyrone", after his mock investiture at Tullaghoge. Conway's troop of horse was expanded into a regiment, the officers being appointed by the English parliament, and Rawdon became major.

In June 1642 Rawdon served under George Monck in the neighbourhood of Armagh, and again had a horse shot under him in a skirmish with Sir Phelim O'Neill. Rawdon employed his men in reaping the Irish harvest of 1643, and endeavoured to maintain the September armistice. He was in Belfast when it was surprised by Robert Monro in May 1644. In the following July, he took part in the indecisive affair with James Tuchet, 3rd Earl of Castlehaven near Dromore. In 1645 he was major of Colonel Hill's regiment of horse, and continued to serve in Ulster till 1649, being often in command of the cavalry.

Rawdon retired from military service soon after the death of Charles I in 1649. Monck, a friend, thought he would have been wiser to continue in command. He was a commissioner of revenue for the Belfast district during the Commonwealth, but refused to serve under Monck in Scotland.

== The Restoration ==
After Oliver Cromwell's death in 1658, he was active in preparing for the Restoration, and in June 1659 he made a journey to Scotland to consult Monck. He was made one of the commissioners for executing Charles II's declaration of 30 November 1660 as incorporated in the Act of Settlement 1662, sat as member for Carlingford in the Irish parliament of 1661, and was made a privy councillor.

In May 1665 Rawdon was created a baronet, and in the following year received grants of land, especially the forfeited estate of the O'Laverys in Down, and other property in Dublin, Louth, and Meath. These rewards were for service done before June 1649. He is credited with establishing as Protestant settlements the towns of Moira and of Ballynahinch in County Down on lands he acquired from dispossessed Irish rebels. About this time Rawdon was active in obtaining the help of Valentine Greatrakes for his invalid sister-in-law Anne Conway, Viscountess Conway.

In 1666 Rawdon was employed in organising the Ulster militia. He was on good terms with Jeremy Taylor, and was hostile to the Presbyterians. He died in August 1684, and was buried with an elaborate funeral at Lisburn.

== Family ==
Rawdon married, in 1635, Ursula, daughter of Sir Francis Stafford, and widow of Francis Hill, but she and her only child died in the following year. On 4 September 1654, he married at Arrow church, Warwickshire, Dorothy, eldest daughter of The Viscount Conway, by whom he had seven sons and three daughters. His third but eldest surviving son, Arthur (d. 1695), was the grandfather of John Rawdon, 1st Earl of Moira (1720–1793).

== Notes ==
Attribution

This article incorporates text from a publication now in the public domain: Lee, Sidney, ed. (1896). "Rawdon, George". Dictionary of National Biography. Vol. 47. London: Smith, Elder & Co.

Baronetage of Ireland
New creation	Baronet (of Moira); 1665–1684	Succeeded by Arthur Rawdon
