= John Child =

John Child may refer to:

- Sir John Child, 1st Baronet (died 1690), governor of Bombay
- John Child (MP) (c. 1677–1703), Member of Parliament (MP) for Devizes 1702–1703
- John Child (volleyball) (born 1967), retired Canadian beach volleyball player

== See also ==
- John Childs (disambiguation)
