= Conrad von Rosen =

Baltic-German French army general (1628–1715)

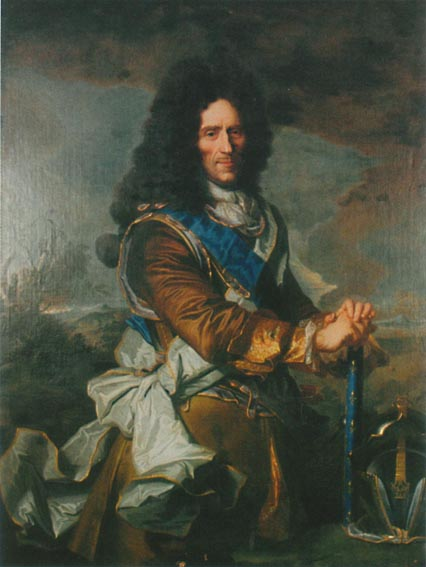
- Portrait by Hyacinthe Rigaud, 1705
- Born: 29 September 1628; Gross-Roop, Swedish Livonia, Swedish Empire (Now Straupe in the Pārgauja Municipality, Latvia).
- Died: 3 August 1715 (aged 86); Bollwiller, Alsace, Kingdom of France
- Military career
- Allegiance: Kingdom of France
- Rank: Maréchal de France
- Conflicts: Battle of Seneffe; Siege of Derry; Siege of Carrickfergus (1689); Battle of Landen

Conrad von Rosen (29 September 1628 – 3 August 1715) was a Baltic German soldier from Livonia, who served in the French army under Louis XIV from 1646 on. He fought in the Franco-Dutch War (1672–1678) and the Nine Years' War (1688–1691). In 1689, he went to Ireland with James II of England and commanded the Jacobite troops during the final stage of the unsuccessful Siege of Derry.

== Family background ==
Conrad was born on 29 September 1628 at Gross Roop (now Straupe) in Duchy of Livonia (now in Latvia), as the third son of Fabian von Rosen (1590–1633) and his wife Sophia (1597–1673). His father's full name was Baron Fabian von Rosen of Klein-Roop and Raiskum; his wife's was Sophie von Mengden of Idsel and Maikendorf. The Von Rosen family was Baltic German and Lutheran.

== Early career ==
As a nobleman's younger son, Conrad von Rosen pursued a military career and in 1644 enlisted in the Swedish army, Livonia at that time being part of Sweden. However, he was exiled after killing an officer in duel. He then asked a relative, Reinhold von Rosen, who served in the French army, for a chance to relaunch his career. Reinhold appointed him an ensign in his regiment in 1646. Conrad de Rosen, as he was called, rose steadily through the ranks.

== Marriage and children ==
In 1660, he married Marie-Sophie de Rosen (1638–1686), Reinhold's only child.

Conrad and Marie-Sopie had ten children, but three boys died in their early childhood. The other seven are:

1. Reinhold Carl de Rosen (1666–1744), comte de Bollwiller, lieutenant general in the French Army
2. Georges Christophe, called the chevalier de Rosen, killed at the Battle of Landen in 1693 as a French captain
3. Anne Jeanne (1662–1727), married Nicolas-Frédéric de Rothenbourg (1646–1716)
4. Maria Sophia (1673–1740), married 1684 Baron Meinrad von Planta von Wildenberg, who was killed in the Battle of Landen in 1693
5. Louisa Maria, a nun at the Visitation of Nancy;
6. Johanna Renata, a nun at the Visitation of Nancy
7. Catharina Magdalena, a nun at the Visitation of Nancy

His father-in-law died in 1667 and Rosen inherited Dettwiller, Herrenstein, and Bollwiller in Alsace. Bollwiller, however, had been pawned to the Fuggers by Reinhold, and Conrad had to pay his father-in-law's debt. He ceded his claims to parts of the Livonian family properties to his brother Otto (died 1709). In 1669 he became a colonel.

== Franco-Dutch War (1672–1678) ==
In the Franco-Dutch War (1672–1678), he excelled at the Battle of Seneffe (1674) under Condé and was appointed brigadier. After the campaign of 1675, Condé retired and was replaced by Luxembourg. In 1677, Rosen became maréchal de camp. Under Luxembourg he fought in the siege of Cambrai (1677) and was wounded. He fought, still under Luxembourg, in the Battle of Saint-Denis in August 1678, where he excelled. This was the last battle against the Spanish of the Franco-Dutch war. Peace was signed in September. However, the war against the Empire raged on. Peace between France and the Empire was only signed in January 1679. Rosen therefore served France in autumn 1678 on the upper Rhine under Marshal Créquy fighting the Imperial army under the Duke of Lorraine.

== Between the wars ==
In 1681, in a climate of increasing religious intolerance before the revocation of the Edict of Nantes, Rosen found it necessary to convert to Catholicism. His children followed, his wife, however, stayed Lutheran. As a reward he was created comte de Bollwiller but he seems never to have used he title.

In 1682 he accompanied Marquis de La Trousse to Piedmont to ensure security during a risky diplomatic mission. That same year, Louis XIV promoted him to lieutenant-general and in 1686 Rosen was appointed commander-in-chief in Languedoc.

== Ireland ==
In the Nine Years' War (1688–97), Louis XIV supported James II of England against William of Orange, who had overthrown James in the Glorious Revolution in England. James had fled to France. Ireland, however, remained in the hands of James's loyal viceroy Tyrconnell. Louis sent James to Ireland trying to reinstate him on the throne. Rosen arrived in Ireland with him at Kinsale on 12 March 1689, having sailed on the ship-of-the-line Entreprenant. Rosen was the highest-ranking of the French officers sent to Ireland with James. Rosen was given the title Marshal of Ireland for the duration of his participation in the campaign.

=== Battle of the Fords ===
On 12 March 1689, Rosen landed with James in Ireland. He went with him to Dublin and then joined the army in the north, taking part in the Jacobite victory at the crossing of the River Finn, called the "passing of the fords". He, together with the General Maumont, crossed the River Finn at Lifford, while Richard Hamilton and Berwick crossed that same river further north at Clady. The way to Derry was open.

=== Siege of Derry ===
On 18 April 1689, Rosen advanced to under the walls of Derry with King James II, who in vain summoned the town to surrender. Rosen then returned to Dublin with the king, leaving the command of the siege to Lieutenant-General Count Maumont, who was, however, killed about a month later in a sally on 21 April. The command then devolved to Lieutenant-General Richard Hamilton, who lacked experience in sieges. As Hamilton did not make much progress, Rosen was sent back to Derry, where he arrived around 20 June. He immediately adopted a much more hard-line approach towards the defenders than his predecessor. Rosen began bombarding the city in a more intense fashion, while also aiming to force the defenders to submit through starvation. He rounded up many Protestant inhabitants of the surrounding countryside who had previously been given legal protections by James and Hamilton, and on 2 July herded them towards the city walls hoping that the sight of them would dispirit the defenders. The garrison responded by threatening to hang Jacobite prisoners who had been taken during the siege. Hamilton quietly reported the matter to King James, who ordered Rosen to immediately cease such activities. James was furious and described the General as a "bloody Muscovite". He then despatched Lord Dover to France to request that Louis XIV replace de Rosen: "... have our dearest brother recall the Marquis de Roze as one after having done what he did at Londonderry incapable to serve us usefully".

=== Later service in Ireland ===
Having failed to take Derry, the Jacobites withdrew southwards. Following the landing of Williamite reinforcements commanded by Schomberg and their capture of Carrickfergus, von Rosen advocated abandoning and burning Dublin and retreating behind the River Shannon, a policy that was rejected by James II. When the Williamite Army was encamped at Dundalk, he dramatically reversed his advice and suggested that the Jacobite army should launch an immediate attack. King James and Tyrconnell rejected this idea as they felt any assault on the entrenched position of the enemy would be suicidal.

In spring 1690, de Rosen and the French ambassador, d'Avaux, were replaced with Lauzun, who assumed both offices: top French commander in Ireland and French ambassador to James II. Lauzun arrived at Cork on 24 March together with seven French regiments. De Rosen and d'Avaux returned to France with that same fleet, departing from Cork on 8 April.

== Back on the Continent ==
On his return to France, he was made maítre-de-camp général de la cavalerie. Rosen continued his career on the continent, where he served under the Dauphin in Germany. In 1691, he commanded the sector of Cuesmes (or Quesme) south-east of the town in the siege of Mons under Boufflers. He commanded the right wing under Luxembourg in the Battle of Landen in July 1693. His son Georges-Christophe and his son-in-law Meinrad von Planta were killed in this battle. He also took part in the siege of Charleroi in October.

On 14 January 1703, he was one of the ten new Marshals of France appointed by Louis XIV. Together with the nine existing ones that made 19 Marshals of France. Being now marshal, Rosen sold his charge of maître-de-camp général de cavalerie to François Éléanor Montpéroux. He was present at the Battle of Oudenarde, where he commanded the Cavalry of the left wing. After the French rout, he skillfully managed to extricate his entire command and making their way along by-roads was able to some 14 hours later make it back to the camp. For this feat Louis de Rouvroy, duc de Saint-Simon referred to him as "that skillful partisan". In 1705, he became a knight of the Order of the Holy Spirit. This gave him the right to wear the blue sash called the cordon bleu that hangs over his right shoulder on his portrait by Hyacinthe Rigaud.

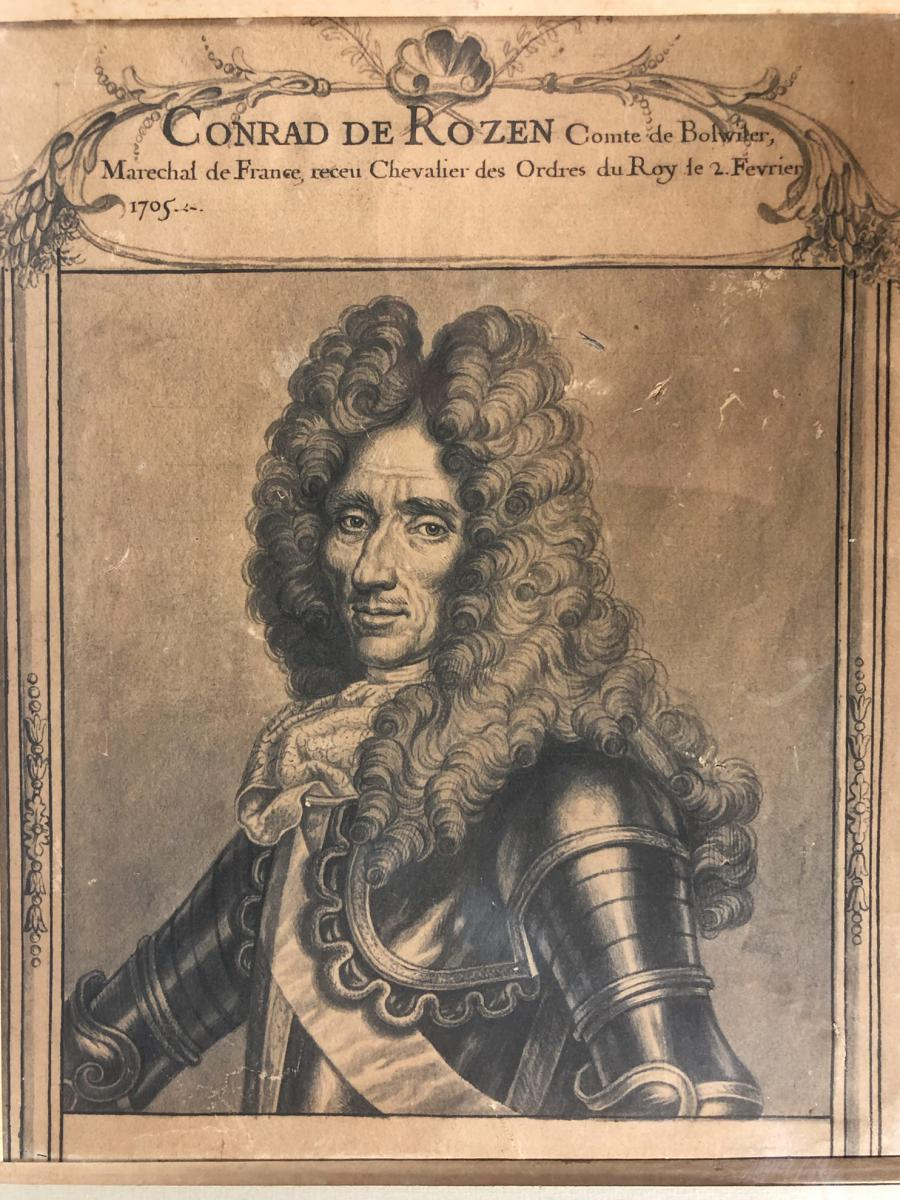
A portrait of Conrad von Rosen as marshal, c. 1705

== Death and timeline ==
Conrad de Rosen died on 3 August 1715 at his castle in Bollweiler, Alsace. He was succeeded by his eldest son, Reinhold Carl, as comte de Bollwiller.

Timeline
Age	Date	Event
0	1628, 29 Sep	Born in Livonia, now northern Latvia.
17–18	1646	Appointed ensign in the French army in the regiment of Reinhold von Rosen, his relative.
31–32	1660	Married Marie-Sophie, Reinhold's only child.
38–39	1667	Reinhold died and he inherited Dettwiller, Herrenstein, and Bollwiller in Alsace.
40–41	1669	Became colonel.
45–46	1674	Fought at the Battle of Seneffe under Condé.
48	1677, Mar & Apr	Fought at the siege of Cambrai.
48–49	1677	Became maréchal de camp.
49	1678, Aug	Fought at the Battle of Saint-Denis.
52–53	1681	Became a Catholic and is created comte de Bollwiller.
53–54	1682	Accompanied Marquis de La Trousse to Piedmont on a diplomatic mission.
53–54	1682	Promoted Lieutenant-General.
57–58	1686	Appointed commander-in-chief in Languedoc.
60	1689, 12 Mar	Arrived with James II at Kinsale in Ireland.
60	1689, 15 Apr	Forced the passage of the River Finn at Lifford together with Maumont.
60	1689, 20 Jun	Back before Derry.
60	1689, 2 Jul	Herded Protestant civilians to the walls.
60	1689, 1 Aug	Abandoned the siege and retreated southwards.
61	1690 early	Replaced with Lauzun.
62–63	1691	Commanded a sector in the siege of Mons under Boufflers.
64	1693, Jul	Commanded the right wing in the Battle of Landen under Luxembourg.
65	1693, Oct	Participates in the siege of Charleroi.
74	1703, 14 Jan	Appointed Marshal of France.
76–77	1705	Appointed Knight of the Order of the Holy Spirit.
86	1715, 3 Aug	Died at Bollwiller.

== Notes and references ==
=== Sources ===
- Anselme, Père (1733a). Histoire généalogique ey chronologique de la maison royale de France [Genealogical and Chronological History of the Royal House of France] (in French). Vol. Tome huitième (Troisième édition ed.). Paris: Compagnie des libraires associez. – Marshals of France
- Anselme, Père (1733b). Histoire généalogique et chronologique de la maison royale de France [Genealogical and Chronological History of the Royal House of France] (in French). Vol. Tome neuvième (Troisième édition ed.). Paris: Compagnie des libraires associez. OCLC 831196155. – Knights of the Order of the Holy Spirit and general index
- Barratt, John (2007). Battles for the Three Kingdoms: The Campaigns for England, Scotland and Ireland, 1689–92. Stroud: Sutton Publishing Ltd. ISBN 978-0750943581.
- Boulger, Demetrius Charles (1911). The Battle of the Boyne. London: Martin Secker. OCLC 1041056932.
- Childs, John (2007). The Williamite Wars in Ireland 1688–1691. London: Hambledon Continuum Press. ISBN 978-1-85285-573-4. – (Preview)
- Doherty, Richard (2008). The Siege of Derry 1689 – The Military History. Stroud, Gloucestershire, England: Spellmount. ISBN 978-1-86227-454-9. – (Snippet view)
- FitzJames, James FitzJames, the Duke of Berwick (1778). Mémoires du Maréchal de Berwick [Memoirs of Marshal Berwick] (in French). Vol. Tome premier. Paris: Moutard. OCLC 1049657563.
- La Chesnaye des Bois, François Alexandre Aubert de (1787). Dictionnaire de la noblesse (in French). Vol. XIII. Paris: Lamy & Badiez. OCLC 491609675. – Additions to the 2nd edition (for Rosen)
- La Chesnaye des Bois, François Alexandre Aubert de (1872). Dictionnaire de la noblesse [Dictionary of Nobility] (in French). Vol. Tome dix-septième (3rd ed.). Paris: Schlesinger Frères. OCLC 797014713. – REV to RYM (for Rosen)
- Quincy, Charles Sevin de (1726). Histoire militaire du règne de Louis le Grand [Military History of the Reign of Louis the Great] (in French). Vol. IV. Paris: Denis Mariette. OCLC 23619104. – 1703 to 1705
- Rousset, Camille (1865). Histoire de Louvois et de son administration politique et militaire jusqu'à la paix de Nimègue (in French). Vol. Tome deuxième. Paris: Didier & Cie.
- Rousset, Camille (1863). Histoire de Louvois et de son administration politique et militaire jusqu'à la paix de Nimègue (in French). Vol. Tome troisième. Paris: Didier & Cie.
- Saint-Simon, Louis de Rouvroy, duc de (1895). Boislisle, Arthur de (ed.). Mémoires du duc de Saint-Simon [Memoirs of the Duke of Saint-Simon] (in French). Vol. Tome onzième. Paris: Hachette. OCLC 1068033585. – 1703
- Saint-Simon, Louis de Rouvroy, duc de (1914). Boislisle, Arthur de (ed.). Mémoires du duc de Saint-Simon [Memoirs of the Duke of Saint-Simon] (in French). Vol. Tome vingt et sixième. Paris: Hachette. OCLC 1068033585. – 1714 to 1715
- Transehe-Roseneck, Astaf von (1935). Genealogisches Handbuch der Baltischen Ritterschaften - Teil Livland, Band II, Lieferung 9 [Genealogical Manual of the Baltic Knights – Livonia Volume 2, 9th Instalment] (in German). Görlitz: Verlag für Sippenforschung und Wappenkunde C A Starke.
- Walker, Rev. George (1893). Dwyer, Rev. Philip (ed.). The siege of Londonderry in 1689, as set forth in the Literary Remains of Colonel the Rev. George Walker, D.D. London: Robert Clavel & Ralph Simpson. OCLC 79434854.
- Witherow, Thomas (1879). Derry and Enniskillen in the Year 1689. London & Belfast: William Mallan & Son. OCLC 82779901.
