= James Hamilton (English Army officer) =

Irish restoration courtier (died 1673)

- Died: 6 June 1673
- Burial place: Westminster Abbey
- Spouse: Elizabeth Colpeper
- Children: James
- Military career
- Allegiance: England
- Branch: English Army
- Rank: Colonel

Family tree

James Hamilton with wife, children, parents, and other selected relatives. (Note: This family tree is partly derived from the Abercorn pedigree pictured in Cokayne and written genealogies of the Abercorns. Also see the list of children in the text.) His eldest son succeeded as the 6th Earl of Abercorn. Earls 4 & 5 are omitted. They descend from Claud Hamilton of Strabane.

Claud; 1st Ld; Paisley; 1546–1621	Margaret; Seton d. 1616
James; 1st Earl; 1575–1618	Marion; Boyd d. 1632	George of Greenlaw & Roscrea d. bef. 1657	Thomas; Viscount; Thurles d. 1619 d.v.p.*
James; 2nd Earl d. 1670	Claud; 2nd Baron; H. of Strabane d. 1638	George; 1st Bt. Donalong c. 1608 – 1679	Mary; Butler d. 1680	James; Butler; 1st Duke; Ormond; 1610–1688
George; 3rd Earl c. 1636 – bef. 1683	James d. 1673 d.v.p.*	Elizabeth; Colepeper d. 1709	Anthony c. 1645–1719; Writer
James; 6th Earl c. 1661 – 1734	Elizabeth; Reading d. 1754
James; 7th Earl; 1686–1744	Anne; Plumer; 1690–1776

Legend

XXX	Subject of the article	XXX	Earls of Abercorn	XXX	Duke of Ormond

*d.v.p. = predeceased his father (decessit vita patris)

Colonel James Hamilton (died 1673) was a courtier to Charles II after the Restoration. He appears in the Mémoires du Comte de Grammont, written by his brother Anthony.

In 1651 when about 13, James and his Father and the rest of the family fled Ireland during the Cromwellian conquest of Ireland. Hamilton then joined the exile court on its wanderings and returned to England with the king at the Restoration. The king appointed him ranger of Hyde Park. Hamilton left the Catholic church to marry a Protestant and the king then appointed him a groom of his bedchamber. In 1666 Hamilton represented Strabane in the Irish Parliament. In 1673, during the Third Anglo-Dutch War, Hamilton lost a leg in a sea-fight with the Dutch and died from the wound a few days later. In 1701 his eldest son succeeded a cousin as 6th Earl of Abercorn.

== Birth and origins ==
James was born about 1638 (Note: Strictly speaking, James's birth date is constrained by the marriage of his parents (1635) and the year 1645 as he must have been at least 21 when he took his seat at parliament in 1666.) in Ireland. He was the eldest son of George Hamilton and his wife Mary Butler. His father was Scottish, the fourth son of James Hamilton, 1st Earl of Abercorn. His father supported the Marquess of Ormond in the Irish Confederate War and the Cromwellian conquest and called himself a baronet. (Note: James's father's article has more detail about these attempts to become a baronet.)

James's mother was half Irish and half English, the third daughter of Thomas Butler, Viscount Thurles and his English Catholic wife Elizabeth Poyntz. Viscount Thurles (courtesy title) predeceased his father, Walter Butler, 11th Earl of Ormond, and therefore never succeeded to the earldom. The Butlers were Old English. James's mother also was a sister of James Butler, making her husband a brother-in-law of the lord lieutenant.

James's place of birth and the date of his parents' marriage are affected by errors caused by confusing his father with his granduncle, George Hamilton of Greenlaw and Roscrea. Both are called George and both married a Mary Butler. In 1640 Ormond had granted James's father Nenagh for 31 years. James was probably born there,. Hamilton's parents had married in 1635, despite earlier dates reported in error due to the mistaken identity. (Note: James's father's article discusses his mistaken identity.)

James was one of nine siblings. See George, Elizabeth, Anthony, Richard, and John. (Note: James's father's article gives a list of all the nine siblings.) James's parents were both Catholic. (Note: James's father's article has some detail about James's Protestant grandfather, the 1st Earl of Abercorn.)

== Irish wars and exile ==
Hamilton's father served in the Irish army under his brother-in-law James Butler, Earl of Ormond, in the Irish Confederate Wars (1641–1648) and the Cromwellian conquest of Ireland (1649–1653). It has long been believed that James, aged about 16 or 17, his mother and siblings lived in Roscrea, County Tipperary, and were spared when on 17 September 1646, the Confederate Ulster army under Owen O'Neill captured Roscrea Castle from the Munster confederates and killed everybody else in the castle. It seems that this Lady Hamilton was not James's mother but his aunt, the wife of Sir George Hamilton of Greenlaw and Roscrea, while James, his mother, and siblings were safe in Nenagh, 30 kilometres (19 mi) west of Roscrea. This confusion was already made by Carte (1737) and repeated by later authors.

On 28 July 1647 Ormond abandoned Dublin to the parliamentarians and left Ireland. In 1648 Phelim McTuoll O'Neill stormed Nenagh taking it for Owen Roe O'Neill and Rinuccini, but it was still in the same year recaptured by Inchiquin, who was now allied with the royalists.

In 1650, Hamilton's father was governor of Nenagh Castle when the Parliamentarian army under Henry Ireton captured the castle on the way back from the unsuccessful siege of Limerick to their winter quarters at Kilkenny.

Early in 1651, when Hamilton was about 21, his family followed Ormond into French exile. They first went to Caen where they were accommodated for some time by Elizabeth Preston, the Marchioness of Ormond. He seems then to have been employed at Charles II's wandering exile court in some ways, whereas his mother went to Paris, where she lived in the convent of the Convent of the Feuillantines, together with her sister Eleanor Butler, Lady Muskerry.

Hamilton seems to have been the "Sir James Hamilton" who together with William Armorer, brother of Nicholas Armorer, executed the traitor Henry Manning near Cologne in December 1655. (Note: Smith (2006) points out that the Armorer present must have been William rather than Nicholas.)

In the late 1650s before the Battle of the Dunes (1658), Hamilton was lieutenant-colonel of Middleton's Scottish regiment of foot, which was part of James II's Royalist Army in Exile, but he seems to have lost his post to William Urry when Newburgh became colonel.

== Restoration ==
The Restoration in May 1660 brought Charles II on the English throne. Hamilton, his father and his elder siblings moved to the court at Whitehall. James and George, became courtiers. Charles restored James's father to his estates at Donalong, Ulster. About that year Charles allegedly also created Hamilton's father baronet of Donalong and Nenagh, but the king, if he really went that far, refused to go further because the family was Catholic.

=== Hyde Park ===
Hamilton was appointed ranger of Hyde Park on 19 September 1660 following the death, on 13 September 1660, of Henry, Duke of Gloucester, the king's brother, who had held this office. While ranger, he built a partial enclosure of Hyde Park and re-stocked it with deer.

He was given a triangular piece of ground at the southeast corner of the park where the street called Hamilton Place, named after him, is now. During the Interregnum buildings were erected for the first time between what is now Old Regent Street and Hyde Park Corner. After the Restoration they were leased to Hamilton. A new lease of 99 years would be obtained by Elizabeth, his widow, in 1692.

=== Courtier ===
Hamilton was known for his fine manners, his elegant dress, and his gallantry. His brother, Anthony Hamilton, describes him in the Mémoires du comte de Grammont as follows (translated by Horace Walpole):

The elder of the Hamiltons, their cousin, was the man who of all the court dressed best: he was well made in his person, and possessed those happy talents which lead to fortune, and procure success in love: he was a most assiduous courtier, had the most lively wit, the most polished manners and the most punctual attention for his master imaginable: no person danced better, nor was any one a more general lover: a merit of some account in a court entirely devoted to love and gallantry.

An admirer of the Countess of Chesterfield, his first cousin, he carried on a romance with her by turning her husband's suspicion on the Duke of York, the future King James II, only to discover that York was courting her as well.

== Marriage and children ==
The king himself obtained for him the hand of Elizabeth, daughter of John Colepeper, 1st Baron Colepeper, one of the maids of honour to Mary, the Princess Royal. As the bride was a Protestant, Hamilton changed religion just before the marriage, which took place in 1661. His mother, a devout Catholic, had in vain tried to dissuade him.

James and Elizabeth had three sons:

1. James (c. 1661 – 1734), succeeded a second cousin as the 6th Earl of Abercorn
2. George (d. 1692), became a colonel in the foot guards and fell in the Battle of Steenkerque
3. William (after 1662 – 1737), married his cousin Margaret Colepeper and became the ancestor of the Hamiltons of Chilston

== Later life, death, succession, and timeline ==
Hamilton's conversion opened him a career in the English Army. He was appointed colonel of a regiment of foot. Compliance avoided him problems similar to those experienced by his younger brother George, who was dismissed from the Life Guards in 1667 due to his religion and then took French service. Anthony and Richard, the third and the fifth of the brothers, followed George into French service.

Hamilton was appointed groom of the bedchamber on 28 October 1664, taking the place of Daniel O'Neill who had died on 24 October.

He was elected to the House of Commons of the Parliament of Ireland for the Strabane borough and sat as Member of Parliament (M.P.) in the Irish Parliament of 1661 to 1666 at Chichester House between 3 July and 7 August 1666.

On 21 August 1667 Hamilton was appointed Provost Marshal-General of Barbados. This was a sinecure, which provided him an income without any duty. He never went there.

On 1 June 1670 at Dover, Hamilton was present at the conclusion of the Secret Treaty of Dover, together with Henrietta of England, called Minette, duchess of Orléans. Minette returned to France where she suddenly died on the 30th. Hamilton was one of the witnesses at her post mortem.

Hamilton was killed in the Third Anglo-Dutch War (1672–1674) while embarked with his regiment on the new ship-of-the-line Royal Charles, Prince Rupert's flagship. (Note: This ship, launched in 1673, should not be confused with the earlier one of the same name that had been launched in 1655 as Naseby.) One of Hamilton's legs was hit by a cannonball on 3 June 1673 when the ship came under fire from the Dutch. He died three days later, on 6 June 1673, of the consequences of this wound. The incident happened four days before the first Battle of Schooneveld, which was fought on 7 June 1673. He was buried on 7 June in Westminster Abbey where his uncle James Butler, 1st Duke of Ormond, erected a monument to his memory. His widow died in 1709.

Despite being the eldest son, Hamilton never inherited his father's titles and land as his father outlived him by six years. However, in 1701 his eldest son, James, on the death of a second cousin, the last heir-male of the main line of the Abercorns, became the 6th Earl of Abercorn.

Timeline
As his birth date is uncertain, so are all his ages. Italics for historical background.
Age	Date	Event
0	Estimated 1638	Born in Ireland
2–3	1641	Sister Elizabeth born
4–5	15 Sep 1643	Cessation (truce) between the Confederates and the government
7–8	17 Sep 1646	Ulster Army captured Roscrea
8–9	28 Jul 1647	Ormond abandoned Dublin to the Parliamentarians.
10–11	30 Jan 1649	Charles I beheaded.
11–12	Oct 1650	Father defended Nenagh Castle against the Parliamentarians
12–13	1651	Fled to France; was employed at Charles II's wandering court like his father
16–17	1655	At Heidelberg with Prince Rupert
19–20	14 Jun 1658	Battle of the Dunes
21–22	29 May 1660	Restoration of Charles II
21–22	1660	Returned to England. Became a courtier at Whitehall
21–22	19 Sep 1660	Appointed ranger of Hyde Park
22–23	1661	Married Elizabeth Colepeper and became a Protestant
25–26	28 Oct 1664	Appointed groom of the chamber
27–28	1666	Sat for Strabane in the Irish Parliament of 1661 to 1666
28–29	21 Aug 1667	Appointed Provost Marshal-General of Barbados, a sine cure
34–35	6 Jun 1673	Died in the Third Anglo-Dutch War predeceasing his father

== Notes and references ==
=== Sources ===
- Airy, Osmund (1886). "Butler, James, twelfth Earl and first Duke of Ormonde (1610–1688)". In Lee, Sidney (ed.). Dictionary of National Biography. Vol. VIII. New York: MacMillan and Co. pp. 52–60. OCLC 8544105.
- Burke, Bernard; Burke, Ashworth Peter (1915). A Genealogical and Heraldic History of the Peerage and Baronetage, the Privy Council, Knightage and Companionage (77th ed.). London: Harrison. OCLC 1155471554.
- Carte, Thomas (1851) [1st pub. 1736]. The Life of James Duke of Ormond. Vol. III (New ed.). Oxford: Oxford University Press. OCLC 1086656347. – 1643 to 1660
- Cartwright, Julia (1900). Madame: A Life of Henrietta, Daughter of Charles I. and Duchess of Orleans. London: Seely and Co. OCLC 1049613066.
- Chester, Joseph Lemuel (1876). Registers of Westminster Abbey. London: Private Edition. OCLC 1140248. – Marriages, baptisms and burials from about 1660 to 1875
- Chisholm, Hugh, ed. (1910b). "Hamilton, Anthony" . Encyclopædia Britannica. Vol. 12 (11th ed.). Cambridge University Press. p. 884.
- Clark, Ruth (1921). Anthony Hamilton: his Life and Works and his Family. London: John Lane. OCLC 459281163.
- Clowes, Wm. Laird (1898). The Royal Navy: A History from the Earliest Times to 1900. Vol. II. London: Sampson-Low, Marston and Company. OCLC 875002561.
- Coffey, Diarmid (1914). O'Neill and Ormond – A Chapter of Irish History. Dublin: Maunsel & Company. OCLC 906164979.
- Cronin, John (October 2009). "O'Neill, Daniel". In McGuire, James; Quinn, James (eds.). Dictionary of Irish Biography (online ed.).
- Debrett, John (1816). Peerage of the United Kingdom of Great Britain and Ireland. Vol. I (10th ed.). London: F. C. and J. Rivington. OCLC 23089464. – England
- Debrett, John (1840). Collen, William (ed.). Debrett's Peerage of Great Britain and Ireland. London: William Pickering.
- Elliott, Marianne (2000). The Catholics of Ulster, a History. London: Allen Lane The Penguin Press. ISBN 0-713-99464-9.
- Firth, Charles Harding (1903). "Royalist and Cromwellian Armies in Flanders (1657–1662)". Transactions of the Royal Historical Society. New Series. 17: 67–119. doi:10.2307/3678138. JSTOR 3678138. S2CID 163012566.
- Fryde, Edmund Boleslaw; Greenway, D. E.; Porter, S.; Roy, I., eds. (1986). Handbook of British Chronology. Royal Historical Society Guides and Handbooks, No. 2 (3rd ed.). London: Offices of the Royal Historical Society. ISBN 0-86193-106-8. – (for timeline)
- G. E. C. (1889). Complete Peerage of England, Scotland, Ireland, Great Britain and the United Kingdom, Extant, Extinct, or Dormant. Vol. II (1st ed.). London: George Bell and Sons. – Bra to C (for Butler)
- G. E. C. (1895). Complete Peerage of England, Scotland, Ireland, Great Britain and the United Kingdom, Extant, Extinct, or Dormant. Vol. VI (1st ed.). London: George Bell and Sons. OCLC 1180818801. – N to R (for Ormond)
- G. E. C. (1903). Complete Baronetage, 1611 to 1800. Vol. III (1st ed.). Exeter: William Pollard & Co. OCLC 866278985. – 1649 to 1664
- G. E. C. (1910). Gibbs, Vicary (ed.). The Complete Peerage of England, Scotland, Ireland, Great Britain and the United Kingdom, Extant, Extinct, or Dormant. Vol. I (2nd ed.). London: The St Catherine Press. OCLC 1042385438. – Ab-Adam to Basing
- Green, Mary Anne Everett (1857). Lives of the Princesses of England from the Norman Conquest. Vol. VI. London: Longman, Brown, Green, Longman, & Roberts. OCLC 4728119.
- Green, Mary Anne Everett, ed. (1860). Calendar State Papers Domestic Series of the Reign of Charles II 1660–1661. London: Longman, Green, Longman & Roberts. OCLC 933109717. – 1660 to 1661
- Hamilton, Anthony (1811). Mémoires de la vie du comte de Grammont (in French). Vol. II. London: William Miller. OCLC 719396809.
- Hamilton, Anthony (1888). Memoirs of Count Grammont. Translated by Walpole, Horace. Philadelphia: Gebbie & Co. OCLC 1048777116.
- Henderson, Thomas Finlayson (1890). "Hamilton, James, sixth Earl of Abercorn (1656–1734)". In Lee, Sidney (ed.). Dictionary of National Biography. Vol. XXIV. New York: MacMillan and Co. p. 185. OCLC 8544105.
- House of Commons (1878). Return. Members of Parliament – Part II. Parliaments of Great Britain, 1705–1796. Parliaments of the United Kingdom, 1801–1874. Parliaments and Conventions of the Estates of Scotland, 1357–1707. Parliaments of Ireland, 1599–1800. London: His/Her Majesty's Stationery Office. OCLC 13112546.
- Knight, Charles (1841). London. Vol. I. London: Charles Knight & Co. Ludgate Street. OCLC 1047469222.
- Larwood, Jacob (1874). The Story of the London Parks. London: Chatto and Windus. OCLC 935397298.
- Mahaffy, Robert Pentland, ed. (1900). Calendar of the State Papers Relating to Ireland, of the Reign of Charles I. 1633–1647. London: His/Her Majesty's Stationery Office.
- Mangianiello, Stephen C. (2004). The Concise Encyclopedia of the Revolutions and Wars of England, Scotland, and Ireland 1639–1660. Lanham MD: Scarecrow Press. ISBN 0-8108-5100-8.
- Manning, Conleth (2001). "The Two Sir George Hamiltons and their Connections with the Castles of Roscrea and Nenagh" (PDF). Tipperary Historical Journal: 149–154.
- Millar, Alexander Hastie (1890). "Hamilton, James, first Earl of Abercorn (d.1617)". In Lee, Sidney (ed.). Dictionary of National Biography. Vol. XXIV. New York: MacMillan and Co. pp. 176–177. OCLC 8544105.
- Ó Ciardha, Éamonn (October 2009). "Hamilton, Sir George". In McGuire, James; Quinn, James (eds.). Dictionary of Irish Biography (online ed.). – This is the George who died in 1676; James is co-subject
- Pepys, Samuel (1893). Wheatley, Henry Benjamin (ed.). The Diary of Samuel Pepys. Vol. II. London: George Bell and Sons. OCLC 503692830. – 1 April 1661 to 31 December 1662
- Paul, Sir James Balfour (1904). The Scots Peerage, Founded on Wood's Edition of Sir Robert Douglas's Peerage of Scotland. Vol. I. Edinburgh: David Douglas. OCLC 505064285. – Abercorn to Balmerino
- Rigg, James McMullen (1890). "Hamilton, Elizabeth, Comtesse de Gramont (1641–1708)". In Lee, Sidney (ed.). Dictionary of National Biography. Vol. XXIV. New York: MacMillan and Co. pp. 146–147. OCLC 8544105.
- Sainsbury, W. Noel, ed. (1880). Calendar State Papers Colonial America and West Indies 1661–1668. Vol. V. London: His/Her Majesty's Stationery Office. OCLC 910244484.
- Sainty, Sir John Christopher; Bucholz, Robert O. (1997). Officials of the Royal Household 1660 – 1683: Department of the Lord Chamberlain and Associated Offices. London: University of London, Institute of Historical Research. ISBN 978-1-87134-840-8.
- Scott, Sir Walter (1846). "Biographical Sketch of Anthony Hamilton". Memoirs of Court of Charles the Second by Count Grammont. London: Henry George Bohn. pp. 3–17. OCLC 870885892.
- Sergeant, Philip Walsingham (1913). Little Jennings and Fighting Dick Talbot: A Life of the Duke and Duchess of Tyrconnel. Vol. I. London: Hutchinson. OCLC 474495830. – 1643 to 1685
- Smith, Geoffrey (May 2006). "Armorer, Sir Nicholas (c.1620–1686)". Oxford Dictionary of National Biography (online ed.). Oxford University Press. doi:10.1093/ref:odnb/94686. (Subscription, Wikipedia Library access or UK public library membership required.)
- Walford, Edward (1887). Old and New London. Vol. IV. London: Cassell & Company. OCLC 1049951160. – Westminster and the western suburbs
- Warner, Ferdinand (1768). History of the Rebellion and Civil-War in Ireland. Vol. II. Dublin: James William. OCLC 82770539. – 1643 to 1660 and index
- Wasser, Michael (2004). "Hamilton, James, first earl of Abercorn (1575–1618)". In Matthew, Colin; Harrison, Brian (eds.). Oxford Dictionary of National Biography. Vol. 24. New York: Oxford University Press. pp. 837–838. ISBN 0-19-861374-1.
- Wauchope, Piers (2004b). "Hamilton, Richard (d. 1717)". In Matthew, Colin; Harrison, Brian (eds.). Oxford Dictionary of National Biography. Vol. 24. New York: Oxford University Press. pp. 888–889, right column. ISBN 0-19-861374-1.
