= Break of Dromore =

1689 battle

Coordinates: 54.417°N 6.149°W

- Part of the Williamite War in Ireland
Date	14 March 1689
Location	near Dromore, County Down, Ireland
Result	Jacobite victory

Belligerents
Williamites	Jacobites

Commanders and leaders
Hugh Montgomery; Arthur Rawdon; Henry Baker	Richard Hamilton

Strength
3,000	2,000

Casualties and losses
~100 missing	Low

The Break of Dromore took place on 14 March 1689 near Dromore, County Down in the early stages of the Williamite War in Ireland. It featured Catholic Jacobite troops under Richard Hamilton and Protestant Williamite militia led by Hugh Montgomery and Arthur Rawdon.

The Protestant forces were taken by surprise and there was little fighting, reflected in the term "Break", a Scottish word for rout. Victory secured Eastern Ulster for the Jacobites but they failed to fully exploit their success.

== Background ==
The 1688/1689 Campaign in the North; key locations

While much of the Protestant population of east Ulster supported the claim of William III to thrones of Ireland, England and Scotland, the rest of Ireland, including the Lord Deputy of Ireland, Richard Talbot, 1st Earl of Tyrconnell and the army, supported James II. As a result, war broke out in Ireland after James was deposed in the Glorious Revolution. At the start of the conflict, the Jacobites were left in control of two fortified positions at Carrickfergus and Charlemont in territory which was predominantly Williamite in sympathy. The local Williamites raised a militia and met in a council at Hillsborough. They made an ineffective assault on Carrickfergus. However, this was easily beaten off and a local Catholic cleric named O'Hegarty reported that the Williamite were badly armed and trained.

The Jacobite commander in the north was Richard Hamilton, an experienced soldier who served with the French military from 1671 to 1685, when he was appointed a colonel in the Irish army. In September 1688, he and his regiment were transferred to England; when James fled into exile, he was held in the Tower of London. Released on parole by William in February, he was sent to negotiate with Tyrconnell but dropped this mission once back in Ireland. Alexander Osbourne, a Presbyterian clergyman, was sent to offer the Hillsborough council a pardon in return for surrender but they refused, reportedly encouraged by Osbourne. On 8 March, Hamilton marched north from Drogheda with 2,500 men to subdue the Williamites by force.

== The 'Break' ==
On 14 March he crossed the river Lagan and attacked a 3,000 strong Williamite force under Lord Mount Alexander at Dromore. Alexander's cavalry fell back in disorder following a charge by the Jacobite dragoons. Seeing this, Hamilton ordered a general advance of his infantry and the Williamite foot fled towards Dromore itself. They were overtaken in the village by the Jacobite cavalry and slaughtered, roughly 400 being killed and the rest fleeing for their lives.

== Aftermath ==
Lord Mount Alexander rode to Donaghadee and took a ship to England, many other Protestants leaving for Northern England or Scotland. Hamilton's men captured Hillsborough, along with £1,000 and large stocks of food but failed to pursue their opponents. This allowed the bulk of the militia under Rawdon and Henry Baker to reach Coleraine, then make their way to Derry, where they took part in the successful defence of the city.

== Sources ==
- Childs, John (1987). The British Army of William III, 1689-1702. Manchester University Press. ISBN 978-0719019876.
- Flynn, Kevin Haddick (2001). Sarsfield & the Jacobites. Mercier Press. ISBN 9781856354080.
- Lenihan, Padraig (2003). 1690 : Battle of the Boyne. Tempus. ISBN 9780752425979.
- Witherow, Thomas (2015) [1873]. Derry and Enniskillen in the Year 1689: The Story of Some Famous Battle-Fields in Ulster. Palala Press. ISBN 978-1340951528.
