= J. W. Childs Associates =

American private equity firm

- Type: Private Ownership
- Industry: Private equity
- Founded: 1995; 31 years ago
- Founder: John W. Childs
- Headquarters: Waltham, Massachusetts, U.S.
- Products: Private equity funds, leveraged buyouts
- Total assets: $3.1 billion
- Website: jwchilds.com

J. W. Childs Associates L.P. (JWC) is an American private equity firm focused on leveraged buyout and recapitalization transactions for middle-market growth companies. JWC places particular emphasis on consumer products, healthcare and specialty retail companies.

The company is headquartered in Waltham, Massachusetts, and was founded in 1995 by longtime buyout investor John W. Childs, who had previously been the number two partner at large-cap Boston-based private equity firm Thomas H. Lee Partners.

== History ==
The firm was founded in 1995 by long-time leveraged buyout investor John W. Childs after a split from Thomas H. Lee. Prior to founding J. W. Childs Associates, from 1987 through 1995 Childs had been a managing director and subsequently the senior managing director of Thomas H. Lee Partners (THL). While at THL, Childs had helped negotiate the buyouts of Snapple Beverages and Ghirardelli Chocolate Company, along with others of the firm's largest investments. From 1971 through 1987, Childs had held various investment positions at the Prudential Insurance Company of America.

J. W. Childs completed a number of large leveraged buyouts including takeovers of several of the following notable companies: Nutrasweet, Chevy's, Empire Kosher, Equinox Fitness, South Beach Beverage Company and Edison Schools.

Additionally, the firm has raised approximately $3.1 billion of investor commitments in three private equity funds:

- JW Childs Equity Partners (1995) - $352 million
- JW Childs Equity Partners II (1998) - $983 million
- JW Childs Equity Partners III (2002) - $1.75 billion
- JW Childs Equity Partners IV – failed fundraising in 2007 ($2.5 billion target)

The firm began "premarketing" its fourth private equity fund in early 2006, with a target size of $2.5 billion. However, in mid-2007, J. W. Childs decided to postpone the fundraising process because institutional investors were proving less receptive to the offering than had been expected. Performance at two of the firm's previous funds was below median for their respective vintage years and many investment professionals resigned from the firm. Additionally, the fundraising environment for private equity firms became increasingly difficult with the onset of the 2007–2008 credit crunch.

In March 2008, following the failed fundraising for JW Childs Equity Partners IV, JWC registered with the Securities and Exchange Commission for a $200 million IPO of J. W. Childs Acquisition I Corp., a publicly traded special-purpose acquisition company (SPAC). Several "fallen" buyout professionals have pursued SPACs (most notably Thomas O. Hicks, formerly of Hicks Muse Tate & Furst) to raise capital when the more common institutional market is unreceptive.
