= John W. Childs =

American businessman

- Born: 1941 or 1942 (age 84–85)
- Education: Yale University; Columbia University
- Occupation: Businessman
- Known for: Arranged the purchase of Snapple
- Title: CEO and founder of J.W. Childs Associates

John W. Childs (born 1941/1942) is an American billionaire businessman, the CEO and founder of J.W. Childs Associates, a private equity firm.

== Early life ==
Childs earned a BA from Yale University and an MBA from Columbia University.

== Career ==
Childs has worked for Prudential Insurance Company, and as the vice president of Canada Carbon. Childs worked for Thomas H. Lee Partners, where he arranged the purchase of Snapple. He has a reported net worth of $1.2 billion.

== Politics ==
Childs is a major Republican donor, giving $1 million to Mitt Romney's campaign and $1.1 million to the Club for Growth, as well as donating to the campaigns of Congressmen Eric Cantor and Paul Ryan.

== 2019 solicitation charge ==
In February 2019, Childs was charged with solicitation of prostitution in connection with a police investigation into Florida massage parlors. Childs denied the charges. After being charged, Childs stepped down as chairman of J.W. Childs Associates.
