= Arthur Rawdon =

Sir Arthur Rawdon
- Born: 17 October 1662
- Died: 17 October 1695 (aged 33)
- Occupations: Landlord; Member of Parliament; General
- Era: Seventeenth Century
- Known for: Building Moira, County Down
- Successor: Sir John Rawdon
- Parent(s): George Rawdon (Father); Dorothy Rawdon (Mother)

Sir Arthur Rawdon, 2nd Baronet (17 October 1662 – 17 October 1695) was an Irish landowner. He built a large part of Moira, County Down in the seventeenth century. Known as "Father of Irish Gardening" and "The Cock of the North", he was a keen botanist, and brought over 400 different species of plant to Moira from Jamaica.

He played an active role in the Williamite War in Ireland. Following the Glorious Revolution he was involved in the raising of the Army of the North, a Protestant force opposed to the Jacobite Irish Army.

== Biography ==
His father was Sir George Rawdon, 1st Baronet. His mother was George's second wife Dorothy, daughter of Edward Conway, 2nd Viscount Conway. Rawdon was a Member of Parliament for County Down, and a general in the army of King William III of England. Besieged at Derry, he fell ill, but managed to escape, though his military career was at an end.

He married Helena Graham, daughter of Sir James Graham of Airth. They had at least two children, John and Isabella.

Rawdon inherited the lands at Moira after his father died. He rebuilt a mansion, surrounded by trees, sheep and huge gardens. On this estate, Arthur built the first hot-house in Europe.

Rawdon was a botanist and imported 400 plant species from Jamaica, earning the name "Father of Irish Gardening". His garden had a labyrinth, ponds, and canals. The trees included the "Locust of Virginia" which was 30 ft high and had a trunk of at least a foot and a half in diameter. For two generations the garden was maintained.

== Legacy ==
Today in Moira many places are named after Sir Arthur Rawdon, including Rawdon Court, off Main Street, Moira. Off Meeting Street there is Rawdon Place which is a housing street. Parts of the remains of his mansion are still visible.

Baronetage of Ireland
Preceded by George Rawdon	Baronet (of Moira); 1684–1695	Succeeded by John Rawdon
