= John Childs (historian) =

John Charles Roger Childs FRHS (born June 1949) is Emeritus Professor of Military History at the University of Leeds.

== Early life and education ==
John Childs was born in June 1949. He studied at the University of Hull, from which he received the degree of BA, and at King's College London, from which he received a PhD with a thesis on the standing army of the Stuart Restoration.

== Academic career ==
Childs first worked in the defence industry before becoming Sir James Knott Research Fellow at Newcastle University. From 1976 to 2009 he taught at the University of Leeds, initially as a Lecturer in the School of History and later as Professor of Military History and head of the Centre for Military History. He subsequently became Emeritus Professor.

His research interests include the history of the British Army from 1660 to 1702 (published as a trilogy), the Stuart Restoration, and European military history of the early modern period. Childs has published numerous monographs and contributions, in particular the Glorious Revolution (1688/89). He is co-author with André Corvisier of A dictionary of military history and the art of war.

Childs is chairman of the Battlefields Panel of Historic England, chairman of the Royal Armouries Development Trust, and a former trustee of the Royal Armouries.

== Selected publications ==
- The army of Charles II. University of Toronto Press, Buffalo 1976, ISBN 0-8020-2180-8.
- The army, James II, and the Glorious Revolution. Manchester University Press, Manchester, 1980. ISBN 0-7190-0688-0
- Armies and warfare in Europe, 1648–1789. Manchester University Press, Manchester, 1982. ISBN 0-7190-0880-8
- The British army of William III, 1689–1702. Manchester University Press, Manchester, 1987. ISBN 0-7190-1987-7
- The Nine Years' War and the British army, 1688–1697. Manchester University Press, Manchester, 1991. ISBN 0-7190-3461-2
- A dictionary of military history and the art of war. Blackwell, Oxford 1994. (Edited and updated version of the original in French by André Corvisier) ISBN 0-631-16848-6.
- The military use of land. A history of the defence estate. Lang, Bern, 1998. ISBN 978-3-906757-66-7
- Warfare in the seventeenth century. Cassell, London, 2001. ISBN 0-304-35289-6
- The Williamite wars in Ireland, 1688–1691. Hambledon Continuum Press, London, 2007. ISBN 978-1-85285-573-4
- General Percy Kirke and the later Stuart army. Bloomsbury Academic, London, 2014. ISBN 978-1-4411-5882-6
- Childs, John (2003). "The Restoration Army 1660-1702". In Chandler, David G. (ed.). The Oxford history of the British army. pp. 46–57.
