= Glorious Revolution =

1688 deposition of James II of England

- Part of the Nine Years' War
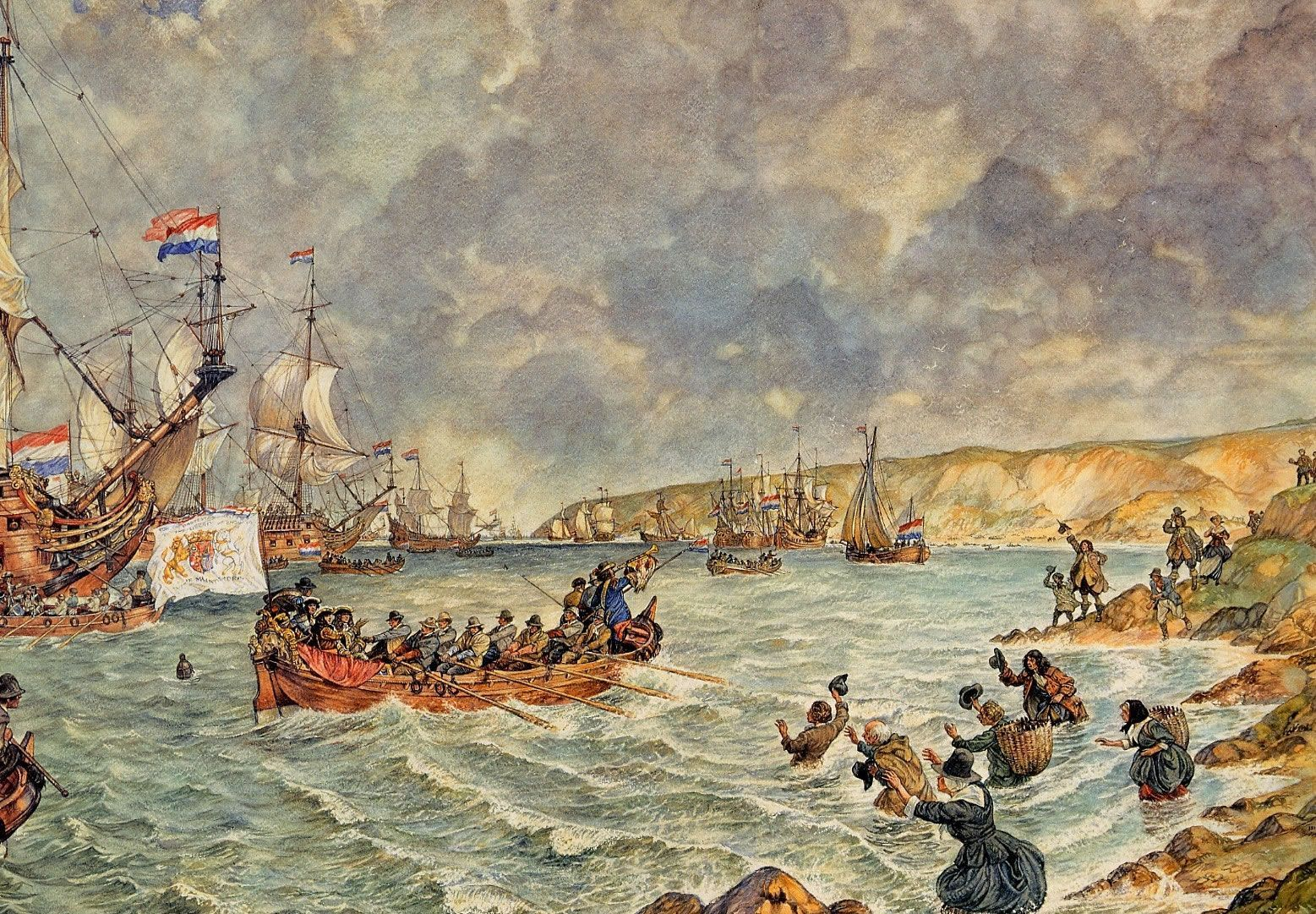
- The Prince of Orange landing at Torbay as depicted in an illustration by Johan Herman Isings
- Date: 1688–1689
- Location: British Isles
- Outcome: James II is deposed by William III and Mary II

The Glorious Revolution (Note: Irish: An Réabhlóid Ghlórmhar; Scottish Gaelic: Rèabhlaid Ghlòrmhor; Welsh: Chwyldro Gogoneddus; also known to the Dutch as the Glorieuze Overtocht, 'Glorious Crossing', or the Revolution of 1688) was the deposition of King James II of England in November 1688. He was replaced by his daughter Mary II and her Dutch husband, James's nephew William III of Orange. The two reigned as joint monarchs of England, Scotland, and Ireland until Mary's death in 1694, after which William continued to reign alone. Jacobitism, the political movement that aimed to restore the exiled James or his descendants of the House of Stuart to the throne, persisted into the late 18th century. Some historians consider William's invasion the last successful invasion of England.

Despite being a Roman Catholic, James had become king in February 1685 with widespread backing from the Protestant majorities in England and Scotland, as well as largely Catholic Ireland, but his policies quickly eroded support. The prospect of a Catholic dynasty following the birth of his son James Francis Edward Stuart on 10 June 1688 led some of his domestic opponents to issue the Invitation to William, seeking Dutch support to remove him.

The Dutch States General and William of Orange were concerned that James might support France in the Nine Years' War. Exploiting unrest in England and claiming to be responding to the invitation, William landed with an army in Devon on 5 November 1688. As William advanced on London, James's army disintegrated and he went into exile in France on 23 December. In April 1689, a Convention made William and Mary joint monarchs of England and Ireland. A separate but similar Scottish settlement was made in June 1689.

Domestically, the Revolution formally established constitutional monarchy as the British form of government, while the Dutch Republic and Britain became allies in resisting French expansion, an arrangement which persisted for much of the 18th century.

== Background ==
Despite his personal Catholicism, James became king in February 1685 with widespread backing in all three of his kingdoms, leading to the swift crushing of Protestant uprisings in both Scotland and England. However, James failed to appreciate the extent to which his power relied on support from the landed gentry, whose alienation fatally damaged his regime. The vast majority of the gentry in England and Scotland were Protestant, while even in largely Catholic Ireland a disproportionate number were members of the Protestant Church of Ireland. His supporters accepted James's personal religious beliefs, so long as he maintained the primacy of the Protestant Church of England and Church of Scotland. When his policies appeared to undermine them, it destabilised all three kingdoms.

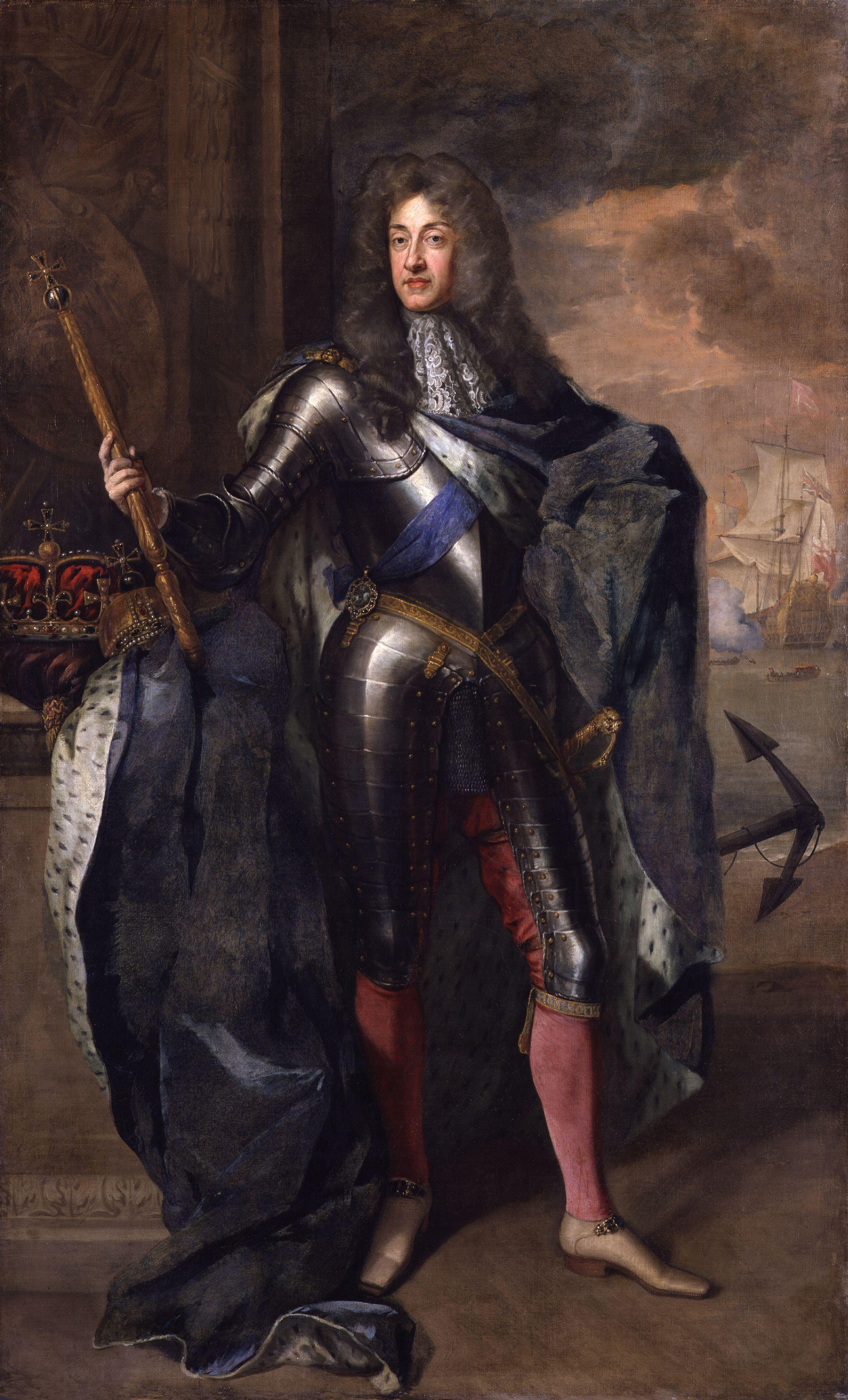
James II and VII, King of England, Scotland and Ireland. Portrait of James II by Godfrey Kneller, National Portrait Gallery, 1684

Stuart political ideology derived from James VI and I, whose political ideology was based on the principle of divine right, and Parliament's function was to obey. Disputes over the relationship between king and Parliament led to the War of the Three Kingdoms and continued after the 1660 Stuart Restoration. Charles II came to rely on the Royal Prerogative since measures passed in this way could be withdrawn when he decided, rather than Parliament. It could not though be used for major legislation or taxation.

Concern that Charles II intended to create an absolute monarchy led to the 1679 to 1681 Exclusion Crisis, dividing the English political class into those who wanted to 'exclude' James from the throne, mostly Whigs, and their opponents, mostly Tories. However, in 1685 many Whigs feared the consequences of bypassing the 'natural heir', while Tories were often strongly anti-Catholic, and their support assumed the continued primacy of the Church of England. Most importantly, it was seen as a short-term issue; James was 52, his marriage to Mary of Modena remained childless after 11 years, and the heirs were his Protestant daughters, Mary and Anne.

There was much greater sympathy in Scotland for a 'Stuart heir', and the 1681 Succession Act confirmed the duty of all to support him, 'regardless of religion.' Over 95 percent of Scots belonged to the national church or kirk, while even other Protestant sects were banned, and by 1680, Catholics were a tiny minority confined to parts of the aristocracy and the remote Highlands. Episcopalians had regained control of the kirk in 1660, leading to a series of Presbyterian uprisings, but memories of the bitter religious conflicts of the Civil War period meant the majority preferred stability.

In England and Scotland, most of those who had backed James in 1685 wanted to retain existing political and religious arrangements, but this was not the case in Ireland. While he was guaranteed support from the Catholic majority, James was also popular among Irish Protestants, since the Church of Ireland depended on Royal support for its survival, while Ulster was dominated by Presbyterians who supported his tolerance policies. However, religion was only one factor; of equal concern for Catholics were laws barring them from serving in the military or holding public office, and land reform. In 1600, 90% of Irish land had been owned by Catholics, but following a series of confiscations during the 17th century this had dropped to 22% in 1685. Catholic and Protestant merchants in Dublin and elsewhere objected to commercial restrictions placing them at a disadvantage to their English competitors.

=== The political background in England ===
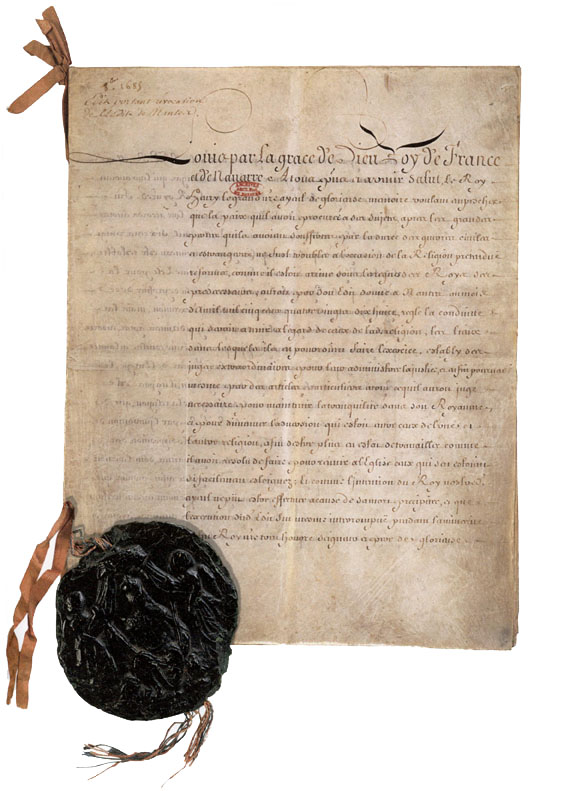
James's attempts to allow tolerance for English Catholics coincided with the October 1685 Edict of Fontainebleau revoking it for Huguenots.

While James's supporters viewed hereditary succession as more important than his personal Catholicism, they opposed his policies of 'Tolerance' under which Catholics would be allowed to hold public office and engage in public life. Opposition was led by devout Anglicans who argued that the measures he proposed were incompatible with the oath he had sworn as king to uphold the supremacy of the Church of England. According to opponents, in demanding that Parliament approve his measures James was not only breaking his own word but requiring others to do the same. Parliament refused to comply, despite being "the most Loyal Parliament a Stuart ever had".

Although historians generally accept James wished to promote Catholicism, not establish an absolute monarchy, his stubborn and inflexible reaction to opposition had the same result. When the English and Scottish Parliaments refused to repeal the 1678 and 1681 Test Acts, he suspended them in November 1685 and ruled by decree. Attempts to form a 'King's party' of Catholics, English Dissenters and dissident Scottish Presbyterians was politically short-sighted, since it rewarded those who had joined the 1685 rebellions and undermined his supporters.

Demanding tolerance for Catholics was also badly timed. In October 1685 Louis XIV issued the Edict of Fontainebleau revoking the 1598 Edict of Nantes which had given French Protestants the right to practise their religion; over the next four years, an estimated 200,000 to 400,000 went into exile, 40,000 of whom settled in London. Combined with Louis's expansionist policies and the killing of 2,000 Vaudois Protestants in 1686, it led to fears that Protestant Europe was threatened by a Catholic counter-reformation. These concerns were reinforced by events in Ireland; the Lord Deputy, the Earl of Tyrconnell, wanted to create a Catholic establishment able to survive James's death, which meant replacing Protestant officials at a pace that was inherently destabilising.

=== Timeline of events: 1686 to 1688 ===
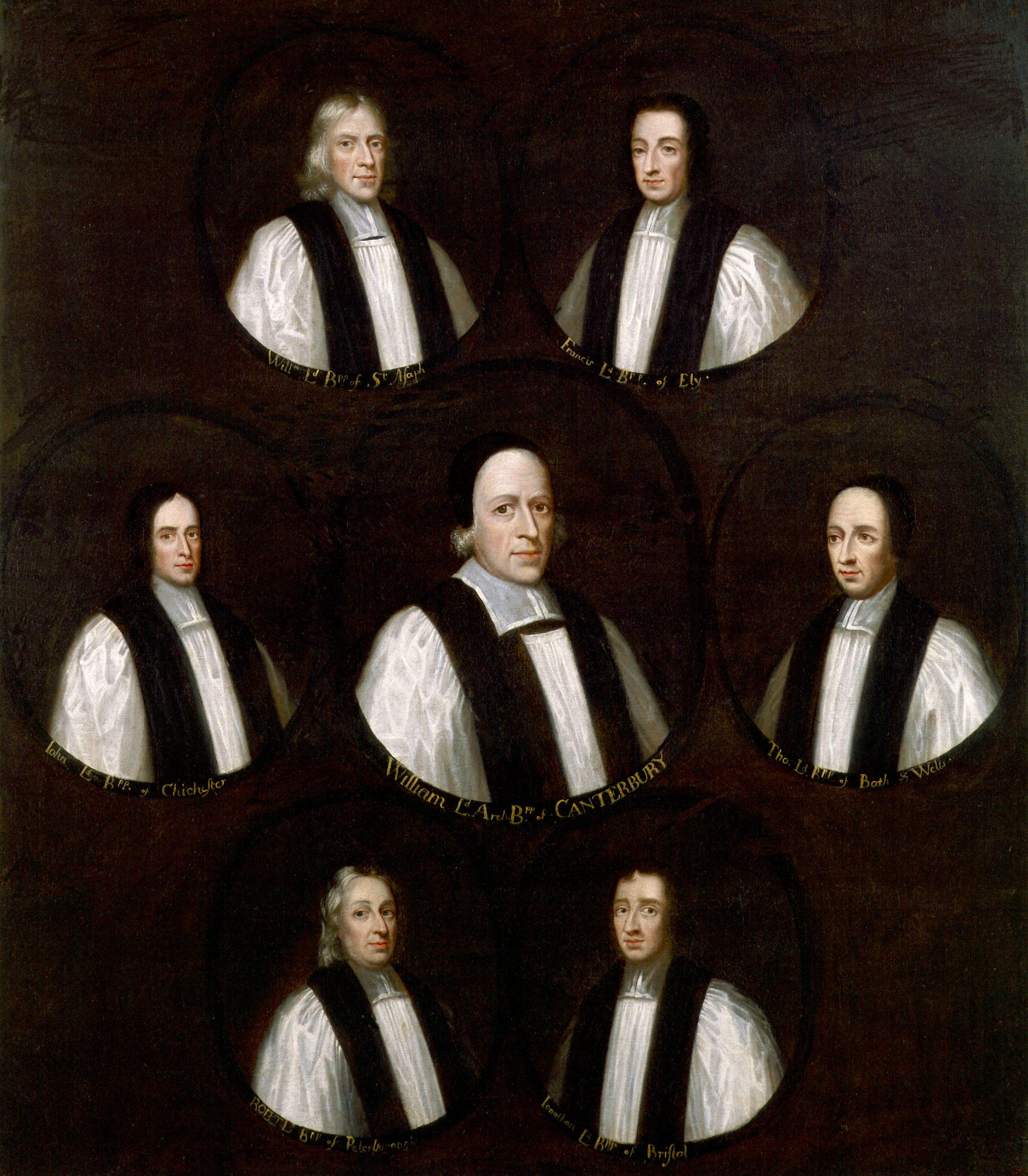
The Seven Bishops prosecuted for seditious libel in 1688

The majority of those who had backed James in 1685 did so because they wanted stability and the rule of law, qualities frequently undermined by his actions. After suspending Parliament in November 1685, he sought to rule by decree. Although the principle was not disputed, the widening of its scope caused considerable concern, particularly when judges who disagreed with its application were dismissed. He then alienated many by perceived attacks on the established church; Henry Compton, Bishop of London, was suspended for refusing to ban John Sharp from preaching after he gave an anti-Catholic sermon.

He often made things worse by political clumsiness; to general fury, the Ecclesiastical Commission of 1686 established to discipline the Church of England included suspected Catholics like the Earl of Huntingdon. This was combined with an inability to accept opposition; in April 1687, he ordered Magdalen College, Oxford, to elect a Catholic sympathiser named Anthony Farmer as president, but as he was ineligible under the college statutes, the fellows elected John Hough instead. Both Farmer and Hough withdrew in favour of another candidate selected by James, who then demanded the fellows personally apologise on their knees for 'defying' him; when they refused, they were replaced by Catholics.

Attempts to create an alternative 'Kings Party' were never likely to succeed, as English Catholics made up only 1.1% of the population and Nonconformists 4.4%. Both groups were divided; since private worship was generally tolerated, Catholic moderates feared greater visibility would provoke a backlash. Among Nonconformists, while Quakers and Congregationalists supported repeal of the Test Acts, the majority wanted to amend the 1662 Act of Uniformity and be allowed back into the Church of England. When James ensured the election of the Presbyterian John Shorter as Lord Mayor of London in 1687, Shorter insisted on complying with the Test Act, reportedly because of a "distrust of the King's favour...thus encouraging that which His Majesties whole Endeavours were intended to disannull."

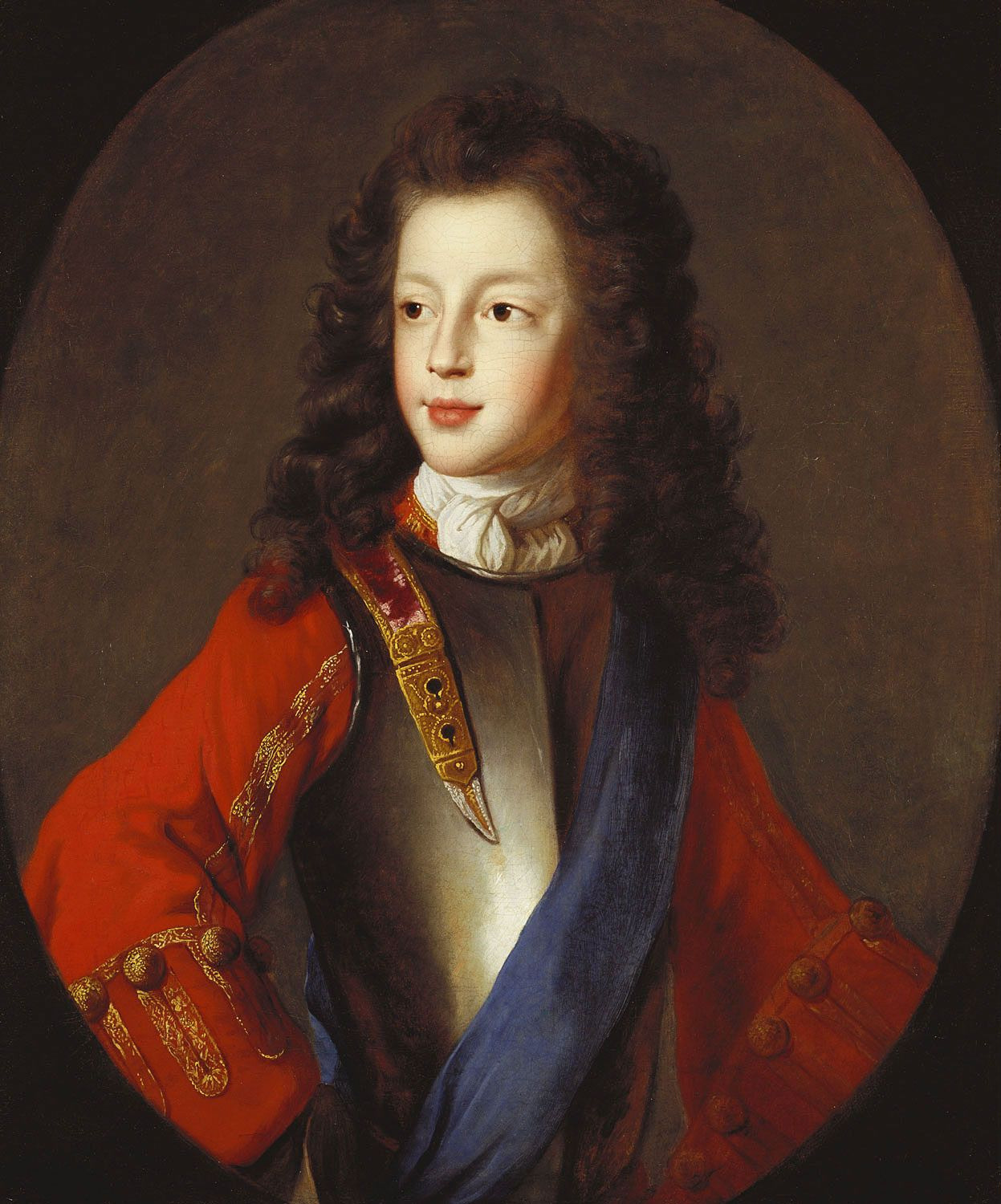
James Francis Edward Stuart, c. 1703, whose birth in June 1688 created the possibility of a Catholic dynasty

To ensure a compliant Parliament, James required potential MPs to be approved by their local Lord Lieutenant; eligibility for both offices required positive answers in writing to the 'Three Questions', one being a commitment to repeal of the Test Act. In addition, local government and town corporations were purged to create an obedient electoral machine, further alienating the county gentry who had formed the majority of those who backed James in 1685. On 24 August 1688, writs were issued for a general election.

The expansion of the military caused great concern, particularly in England and Scotland, where memories of the Civil War left huge resistance to armies. In Ireland, Talbot replaced Protestant officers with Catholics; James did the same in England, while basing the troops at Hounslow appeared a deliberate attempt to overawe Parliament. In April 1688, he ordered his Declaration of Indulgence read in every church; when the Archbishop of Canterbury and six other bishops refused, they were charged with seditious libel and confined in the Tower of London. Two events turned dissent into a crisis: the birth of James Francis Edward Stuart on 10 June created the prospect of a Catholic dynasty, while the acquittal of the Seven Bishops on 30 June destroyed James's political authority.

== Dutch intervention ==
=== Prelude: 1685 to June 1688 ===
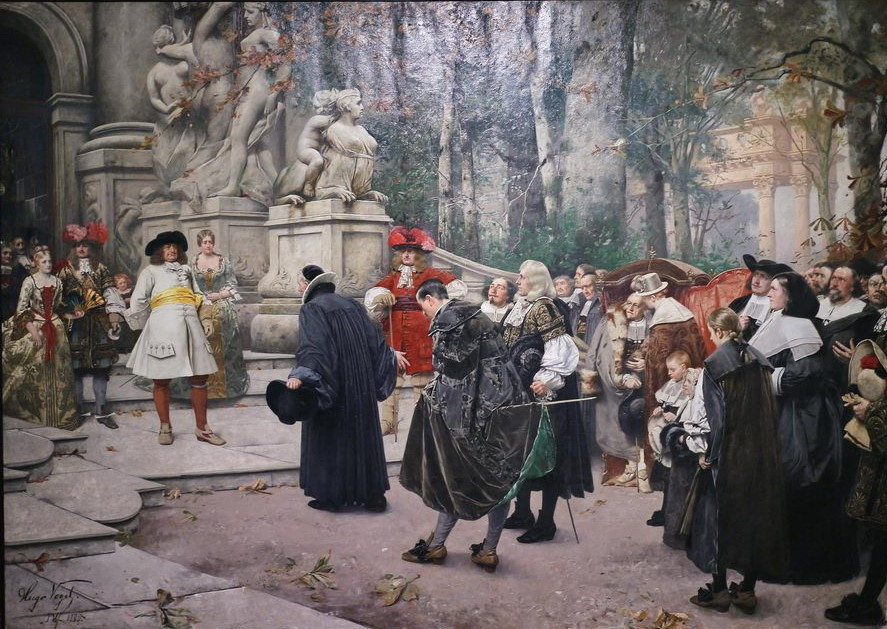
Huguenot refugees, whose expulsion from France in 1685 helped create a sense that Protestant Europe was under threat

In 1677, James's elder daughter and heir Mary had married her Protestant cousin William III of Orange, stadtholder of the main provinces of the Dutch Republic. The two had initially shared common objectives in wanting Mary to succeed her father, while French ambitions in the Spanish Netherlands threatened both English and Dutch trade. Although William sent James troops to help suppress the 1685 Monmouth Rebellion, their relationship deteriorated thereafter.

The Franco-Dutch War, continued French expansion, and expulsion of the Huguenots meant William assumed another war was inevitable, and although the States General of the Netherlands preferred peace, the majority accepted he was correct. This view was widely shared throughout Protestant Europe; in October 1685, Frederick William, Elector of Brandenburg renounced his French alliance for one with the Dutch. In July 1686, other Protestant states formed the anti-French League of Augsburg, with Dutch support. Securing or neutralising English resources, especially the Royal Navy, now became key to both sides.

Following a skirmish between French and Dutch naval vessels in July 1686, William concluded English neutrality was not enough and he needed their active support in the event of war. His relationship with James was affected by the fact both men relied on advisors with relatively limited views; in William's case, mainly English and Scots Presbyterian exiles, the latter with close links to the Protestant minority in Ireland, who saw Tyrconnell's policies as a threat to their existence. Having largely alienated his Tory support base, James depended on a small circle of Catholic converts like Sunderland, Melfort and Perth.

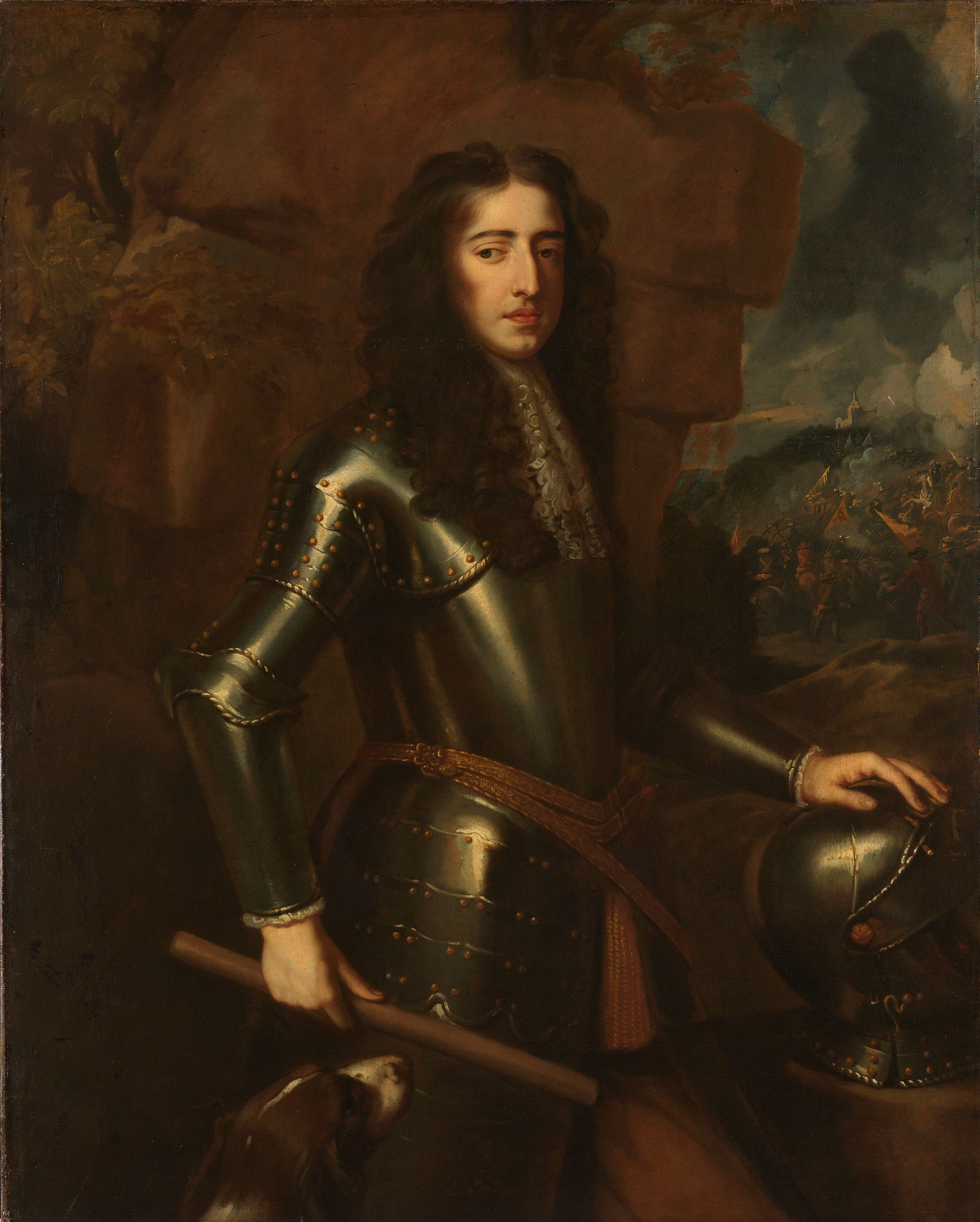
William III of England, stadtholder of Guelders, Holland, Zealand, Utrecht and Overijssel

Suspicions increased when James sought William's backing for repealing the Test Acts; he predictably refused, further damaging their relationship. Having previously assumed he was guaranteed English support in a war with France, William now worried he might face an Anglo-French alliance like during the Rampjaar, despite assurances by James he had no intention of doing so. Historians argue whether these assurances were genuine, but James did not fully appreciate the distrust caused by his domestic policies. In August 1687, William's cousin de Zuylestein travelled to England with condolences on the death of Mary of Modena's mother, allowing him to make contact with the political opposition. Throughout 1688, his English supporters provided William detailed information on public opinion and developments, very little of which was intercepted.

In October 1687, after fourteen years of marriage and multiple miscarriages, it was announced the Queen was pregnant, Melfort immediately declaring it was a boy. When James then wrote to Mary urging her to convert to Catholicism, it convinced many he was seeking a Catholic heir one way or the other, and may have been a deciding factor in whether to invade. Early in 1688, a pamphlet circulated in England written by Dutch Grand Pensionary Gaspar Fagel guaranteeing William's support for freedom of worship for Dissenters and retaining the Test Acts, unlike James who offered tolerance in return for repeal.

In April 1688, Louis XIV announced tariffs on Dutch herring imports, along with plans to support the Royal Navy in the English Channel. James immediately denied making any such request, but fearing it was the prelude to a formal alliance, the Dutch began preparing a military intervention. On the pretext of needing additional resources to deal with French privateers, in July the States General authorised an additional 9,000 sailors and 21 new warships.

=== Invitation to William ===
Henry Sydney, who drafted the Invitation to William

The success of William's invasion would partly depend on domestic support, and at the end of April William met with Edward Russell, unofficial envoy for the Whig opposition. In a conversation recorded by Gilbert Burnet, he requested a formal invitation asking him to "rescue the nation and the religion", with a projected date of end September. William subsequently claimed he was 'forced' to take control of the conspiracy when Russell warned him the English would rise against James even without his help, and he feared this would lead to a republic, depriving his wife of her inheritance.

Although this version is strongly disputed, Zuylestein returned to England in June, ostensibly to congratulate James on his new son, in reality to co-ordinate with William's supporters. Spurred by the prospect of a Catholic successor, the "Invitation to William" was quickly drafted by Henry Sydney, later described by Whig historians as "the great wheel on which the Revolution rolled". (Note: "We have great reason to believe, we shall be every day in a worse condition than we are, and less able to defend ourselves, and therefore we do earnestly wish we might be so happy as to find a remedy before it be too late for us to contribute to our own deliverance ... the people are so generally dissatisfied with the present conduct of the government, in relation to their religion, liberties and properties (all which have been greatly invaded), and they are in such expectation of their prospects being daily worse, that your Highness may be assured, there are nineteen parts of twenty of the people throughout the kingdom, who are desirous of a change; and who, we believe, would willingly contribute to it, if they had such a protection to countenance their rising, as would secure them from being destroyed.") The signatories provided no considerable political power, but they were selected to make it seem like they represented a broad spectrum, and provided William with an essential propaganda tool.

The signatories (also known as the Immortal Seven) were:

- Henry Sydney (author of the letter)
- Edward Russell
- Charles Talbot, 12th Earl of Shrewsbury
- William Cavendish, 4th Earl of Devonshire
- Thomas Osborne, 1st Earl of Danby
- Richard Lumley, 2nd Viscount Lumley
- Henry Compton, Bishop of London

Danby, a Tory, and Devonshire, a Whig; Henry Compton, Bishop of London, for the church; Shrewsbury and Lumley for the army, and finally Russell and Sydney for the navy. They promised to support a Dutch landing, but stressed the importance of acting quickly.

The Invitation was carried to The Hague on 30 June by Rear Admiral Herbert, disguised as a common sailor. Meanwhile, William's ally Bentinck launched a propaganda campaign in England, which presented him as a "true Stuart", but one without the faults of either James or Charles II. Much of the "spontaneous" support for William on his landing was organised by Bentinck and his agents.

== Dutch preparations: July to September 1688 ==
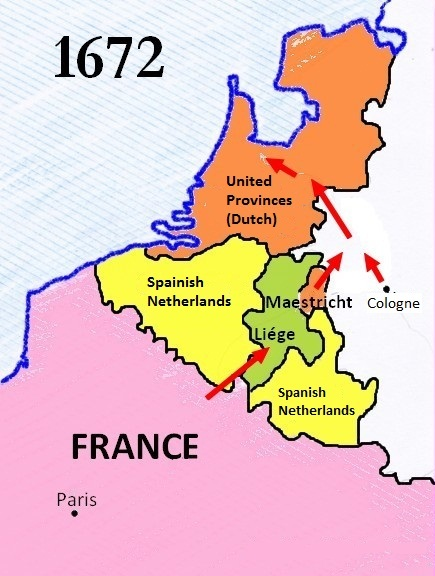
The Dutch were concerned by their vulnerable eastern border. In 1672, an alliance with the Electorate of Cologne allowed France to nearly over-run the Republic.

William's key strategic purpose was creating a defensive coalition that would block further French expansion in Europe, an objective not shared by the majority of his English supporters. In 1672, an alliance with the Electorate of Cologne had enabled France to bypass Dutch forward defences and nearly over-run the Republic, so ensuring an anti-French ruler was vital to prevent a repetition. As an ecclesiastical principality of the Holy Roman Empire, Cologne's ruler was nominated by Pope Innocent XI, in conjunction with Emperor Leopold I. Both Louis and James were in dispute with Innocent over the right to appoint Catholic bishops and clergy; when the old Elector died in June 1688, Innocent and Leopold ignored the French candidate in favour of Joseph Clemens of Bavaria.

After 1678, France continued its expansion into the Rhineland, including the 1683 to 1684 War of the Reunions, additional territorial demands in the Palatinate, and construction of forts at Landau and Traben-Trarbach. This presented an existential threat to Habsburg dominance, guaranteeing Leopold's support for the Dutch, and negating French attempts to build German alliances. William's envoy Johann von Görtz assured Leopold English Catholics would not be persecuted and intervention was to elect a free Parliament, not depose James, a convenient fiction that allowed him to remain neutral.

Although his English supporters considered a token force sufficient, William assembled 260 transport ships and 15,000 men, nearly half the 30,000 strong Dutch States Army. With France on the verge of war, their absence was of great concern to the States General and Bentinck hired 13,616 German mercenaries to man Dutch border fortresses, freeing elite units like the Scots Brigade for use in England. The increase could be presented as a limited precaution against French aggression, as the Dutch would typically double or triple their army strength in wartime; (Note: At the end of the year the Dutch army counted more than 70,000 men) William instructed his experienced deputy Schomberg to prepare for a campaign in Germany.

== Decision to invade ==
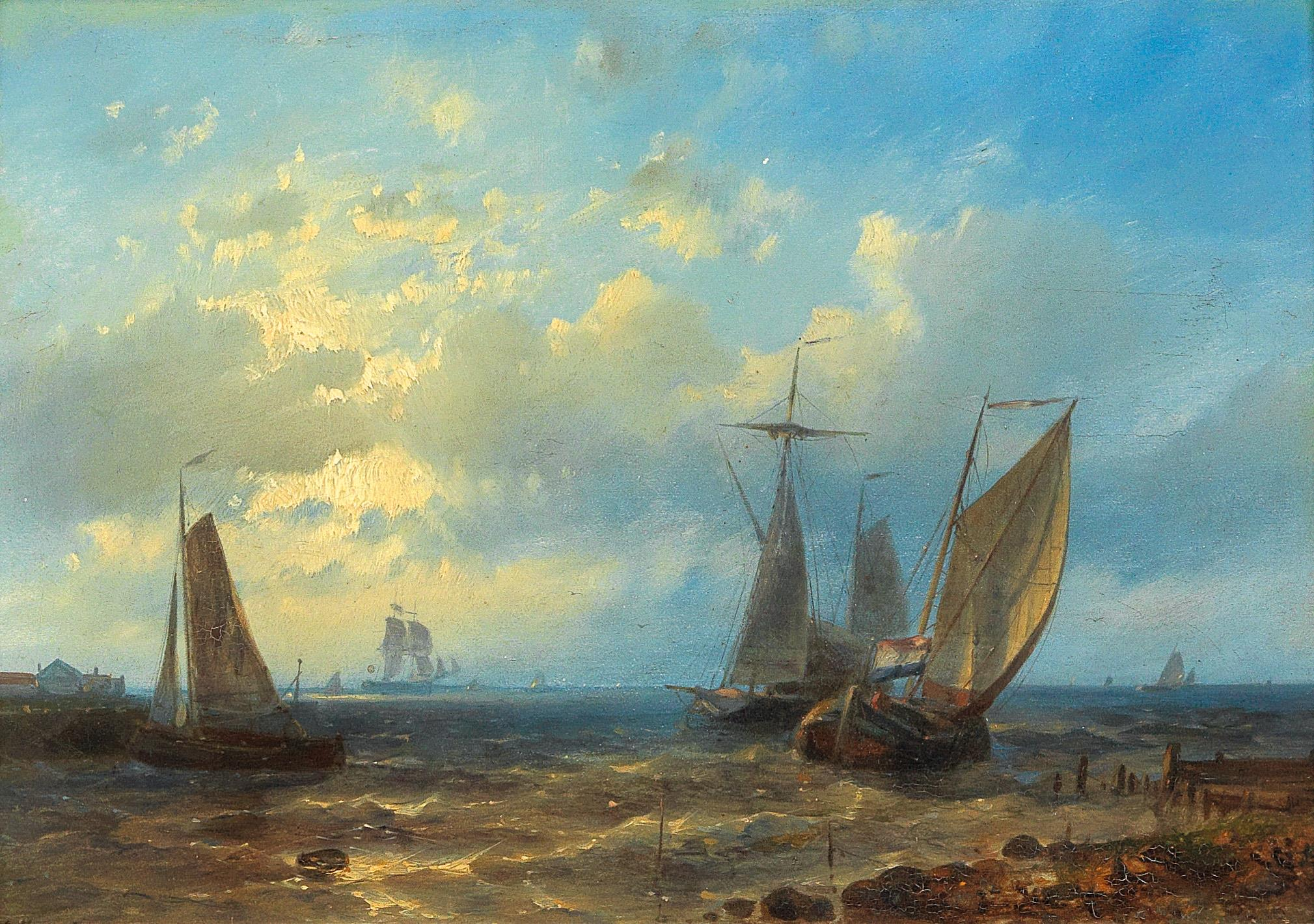
A Dutch herring fleet. French tariffs on this lucrative trade helped William build domestic support for military intervention.

At the beginning of September, an invasion remained in the balance, with the States General fearing a French attack via Flanders while their army was in England. However, the surrender of Belgrade on 6 September seemed to presage an Ottoman collapse and release Austrian resources for use in Germany. Hoping to act before Leopold could respond and relieve pressure on the Ottomans, Louis attacked Philippsburg. With France now committed in Germany, this greatly reduced the threat to the Dutch.

Instead, Louis attempted to intimidate the States General, and on 9 September, his envoy D'Avaux handed them two letters. The first warned an attack on James meant war with France, the second any interference with French operations in Germany would end with the destruction of the Dutch state. Both misfired; convinced Louis was trying to drag him into war, James told the Dutch there was no secret Anglo-French alliance against them, although his denials only increased their suspicions. By confirming France's primary objective was the Rhineland, the second allowed William to move troops from the eastern border to the coast, even though most of the new mercenaries had yet to arrive.

On 22 September, the French seized over 100 Dutch ships, many owned by Amsterdam merchants. In response, on 26 September the Amsterdam City Council agreed to back William. This was a significant decision since the Council dominated the States of Holland, the most powerful political body in the Dutch Republic which contributed nearly 60% of its budget. French troops entered the Rhineland on 27 September and. in a secret session held on 29th, William argued for a pre-emptive strike, as Louis and James would "attempt to bring this state to its ultimate ruin and subjugation, as soon as they find the occasion". This was accepted by the States, with the objective left deliberately vague, other than making the English "King and Nation live in a good relation, and useful to their friends and allies, and especially to this State".

Following their approval, the Amsterdam financial market raised a loan of four million guilders in only three days, with further financing coming from various sources, including two million guilders from the banker Francisco Lopes Suasso. (Note: When asked what security he desired, Suasso allegedly answered: "If you are victorious, you will surely repay me; if not, the loss is mine.") The biggest concern for Holland was the potential impact on the Dutch economy and politics of William becoming ruler of England; the claim he had no intention of "removing the King from the throne" was not believed. These fears were arguably justified; William's access to English resources permanently diminished Amsterdam's power within the Republic and its status as the world's leading commercial and financial centre.

== English defensive strategy ==
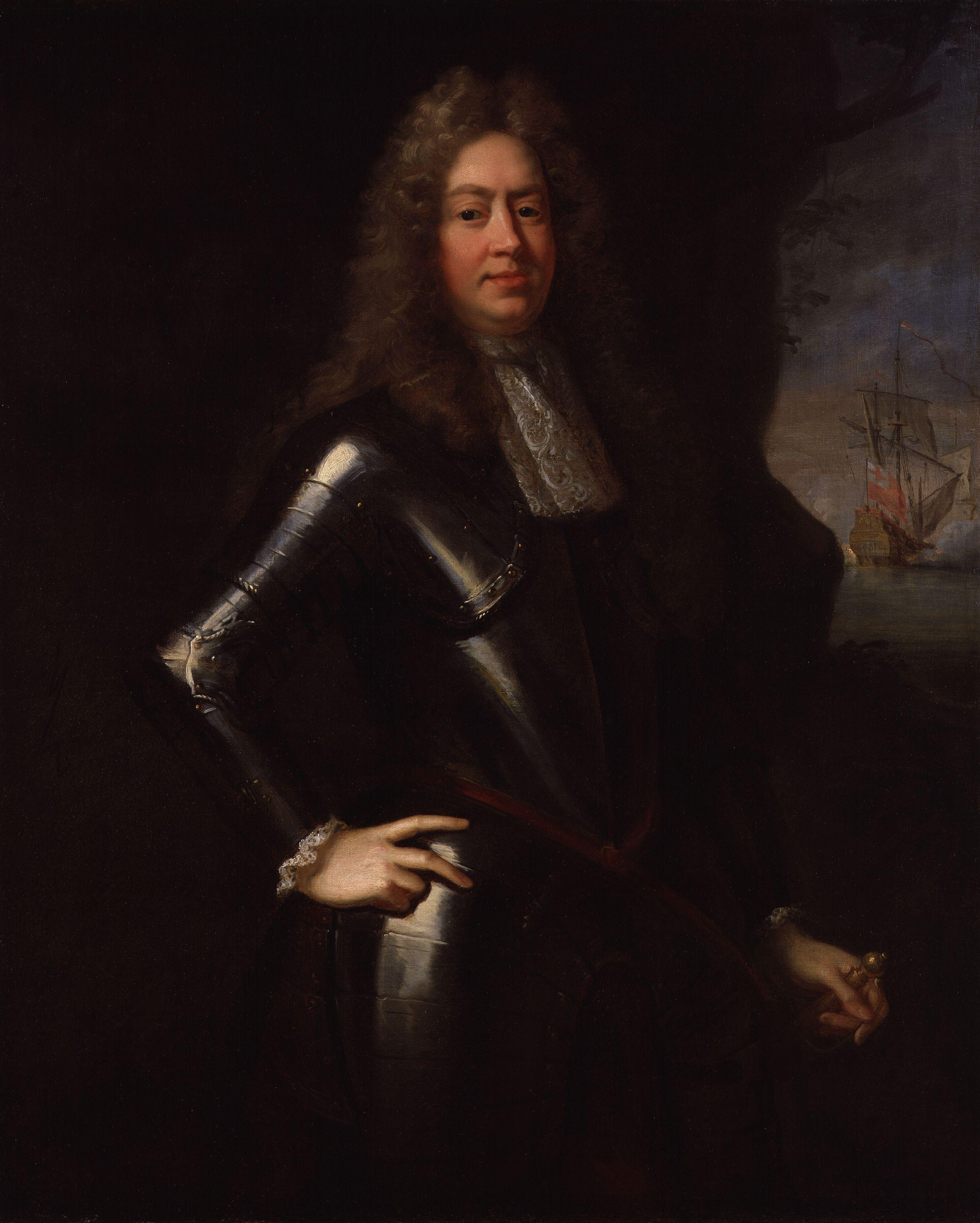
Admiral Dartmouth, commander of the English fleet

Neither James nor Sunderland trusted Louis, correctly suspecting that his support would continue only so long as it coincided with French interests, while Mary of Modena claimed his warnings were simply an attempt to drag England into an unwanted alliance. As a former naval commander, James appreciated the difficulties of a successful invasion, even in good weather, and as autumn approached, the likelihood seemed to diminish. With the Dutch on the verge of war with France, he did not believe the States General would allow William to make the attempt; if they did, his army and navy were strong enough to defeat it.

Reasonable in theory, his reliance on the loyalty and efficiency of the military proved deeply flawed. Both the army and the navy remained overwhelmingly Protestant and anti-Catholic; in July, only personal intervention by James had prevented a naval mutiny when a Catholic captain held Mass on his ship. The transfer of 2,500 Catholics from the Royal Irish Army to England in September led to clashes with Protestant troops, some of his most reliable units refused to obey orders, and many of their officers resigned.

When James demanded the repatriation of all six regiments of the Scots Brigade in January 1688, William refused but used the opportunity to purge those considered unreliable, a total of 104 officers and 44 soldiers. Some may have been Williamite agents, such as Colonel Belasyse, a Protestant with over 15 years of service who returned to his family estates in Yorkshire and made contact with Danby. The promotion of Catholic former Brigade officers like Thomas Buchan and Alexander Cannon to command positions led to the formation of the Association of Protestant Officers, which included senior veterans like Charles Trelawny, John Churchill, and Percy Kirke.

On 14 August, Churchill offered his support to William, helping convince him it was safe to risk an invasion. Although James was aware of the conspiracy, he took no action. One reason may have been fears over the impact on the army; with a notional strength of 34,000, it looked impressive on paper but morale was brittle while many were untrained or lacked weapons. It also had to fill policing roles previously delegated to the militia, which had been deliberately allowed to decay; most of the 4,000 regular troops brought from Scotland in October had to be stationed in London to keep order. In October, attempts were made to restore the militia but many members were reportedly so angry at the changes made to local corporations, James was advised it was better not to raise them.

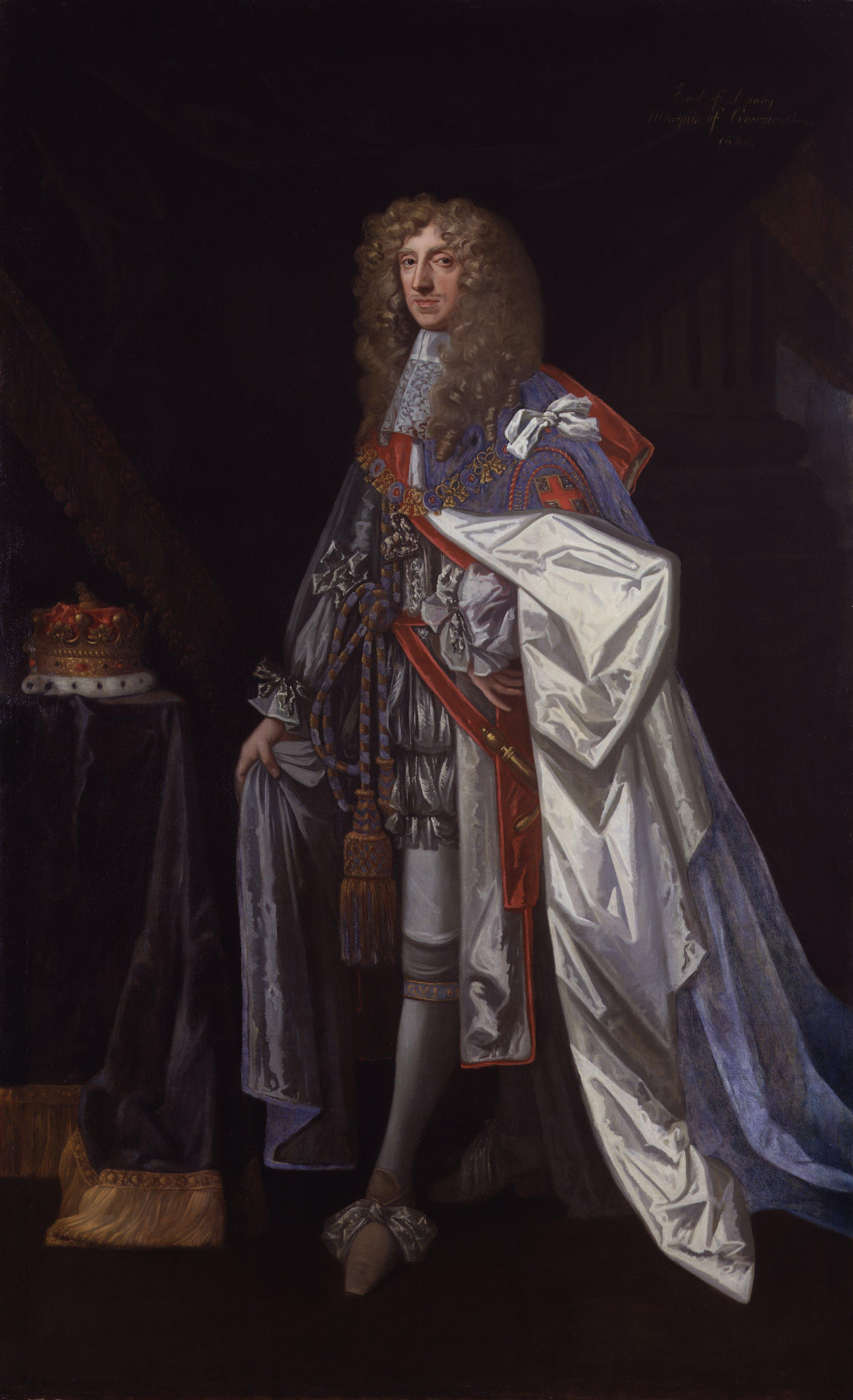
Lord Danby, one of the Immortal Seven and William's agent in Northern England

Widespread discontent and growing hostility to the Stuart regime were particularly apparent in North-East and South-West England, the two landing sites identified by William. A Tory whose brother Jonathan was one of the Seven Bishops, Trelawny's commitment confirmed support from a powerful and well-connected West Country bloc, allowing access to the ports of Plymouth and Torbay. In the north, a force organised by Belasyse and Danby prepared to seize York, its most important city, and Hull, its largest port.

Herbert had been replaced by Dartmouth as commander of the fleet when he defected in June, but many captains owed Herbert their appointments and were of doubtful loyalty. Dartmouth suspected Berkeley and Grafton of plotting to overthrow him; to monitor them, he placed their ships next to his and minimised contact between the other vessels to prevent conspiracy. A lack of funds meant that, excluding fireships and light scouting vessels, only 16 warships were available in early October, all third or fourth rates which were short of both men and supplies.

While the Downs was the best place to intercept a cross-Channel attack, it was also vulnerable to a surprise assault, even for ships fully crewed and adequately provisioned. Instead, James placed his ships in a strong defensive position near Chatham Dockyard, believing the Dutch would seek to establish naval superiority before committing to a landing. While this had been the original plan, winter storms meant conditions deteriorated rapidly for those on the transports; William therefore decided to sail in convoy and avoid battle. The easterly winds which allowed the Dutch to cross prevented the Royal Navy leaving the Thames estuary and intervening.

The English fleet was outnumbered 2:1, undercrewed, short of supplies, and in the wrong place. Key landing locations in the south-west and Yorkshire had been secured by sympathisers, while both army and navy were led by officers whose loyalty was questionable. Even early in 1686, foreign observers had doubted the military would fight for James against a Protestant heir, and William claimed only to be securing the inheritance of his wife Mary. While still a dangerous undertaking, the invasion was less risky than it seemed.

== Invasion ==
=== Embarkation of the army and the Declaration of The Hague ===
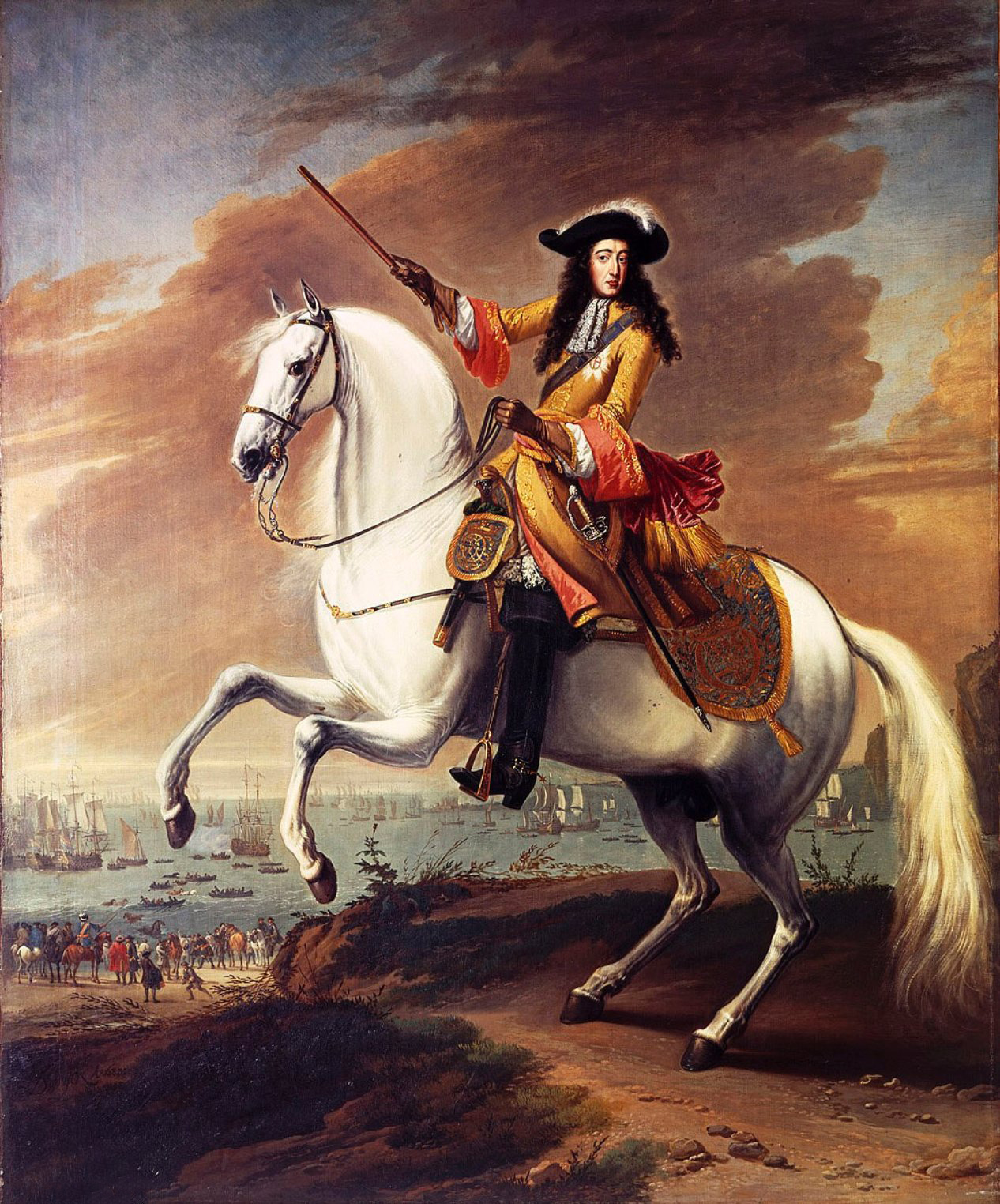
William III by Jan Wyck, commemorating the landing at Brixham, Torbay, 5 November 1688

The Dutch preparations, though carried out with great speed, could not remain secret. The English envoy Ignatius White, the Marquess d'Albeville, warned his country: "an absolute conquest is intended under the specious and ordinary pretences of religion, liberty, property and a free Parliament". Louis threatened an immediate declaration of war if William proceeded and sent James 300,000 livres.

Embarkations, begun on 22 September (New Style), had been completed on 8 October, and the expedition was that day openly approved by the States of Holland; the same day James issued a proclamation to the English nation that it should prepare for a Dutch invasion to ward off conquest. On 30 September/10 October (Old Style/New Style) William issued the Declaration of The Hague (actually written by Fagel), of which 60,000 copies of the English translation by Gilbert Burnet were distributed after the landing in England, in which he assured that his only aim was to maintain the Protestant religion, install a free parliament and investigate the legitimacy of the Prince of Wales. He would respect the position of James. (Note: William declared: It is both certain and evident to all men, that the public peace and happiness of any state or kingdom cannot be preserved, where the Laws, Liberties, and Customs, established by the lawful authority in it, are openly transgressed and annulled; more especially where the alteration of Religion is endeavoured, and that a religion, which is contrary to law, is endeavoured to be introduced; upon which those who are most immediately concerned in it are indispensably bound to endeavour to preserve and maintain the established Laws, Liberties and customs, and, above all, the Religion and Worship of God, that is established among them; and to take such an effectual care, that the inhabitants of the said state or kingdom may neither be deprived of their Religion, nor of their Civil Rights. — William III of Orange)

William went on to condemn James's advisers for overturning the religion, laws, and liberties of England, Scotland, and Ireland by the use of the suspending and dispensing power; the establishment of the "manifestly illegal" commission for ecclesiastical causes and its use to suspend the Bishop of London and to remove the Fellows of Magdalen College, Oxford. William also condemned James's attempt to repeal the Test Acts and the penal laws through pressuring individuals and waging an assault on parliamentary boroughs, as well as his purging of the judiciary. James's attempt to pack Parliament was in danger of removing "the last and great remedy for all those evils".

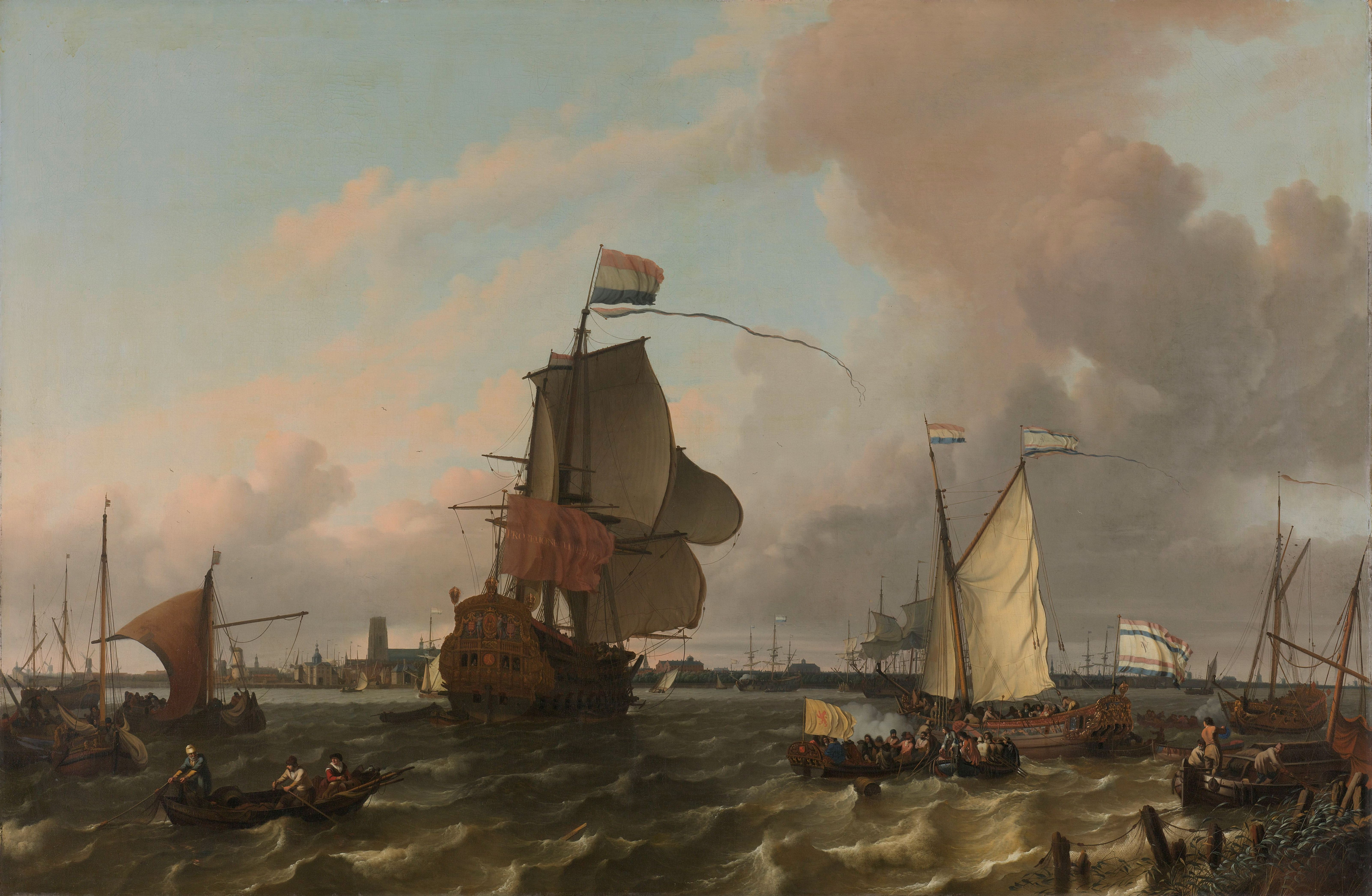
William boarding Den Briel

"Therefore", William continued, "we have thought fit to go over to England, and to carry over with us a force sufficient, by the blessing of God, to defend us from the violence of those evil Counsellors ... this our Expedition is intended for no other design, but to have, a free and lawful Parliament assembled as soon as is possible". On 4/14 October, William responded to the allegations by James in a second declaration, denying any intention to become king or to conquer England, a claim which remains controversial.

The swiftness of the embarkations surprised all foreign observers. Louis had in fact delayed his threats against the Dutch until early September because he assumed it then would be too late in the season to set the expedition in motion anyway, should their reaction prove negative; typically, such an enterprise would take at least some months. Being ready after the last week of September / first week of October would normally have meant that the Dutch could have profited from the last spell of good weather, as the autumn storms tend to begin in the third week of that month. However, this year they came early. For three weeks, adverse south-westerly gales prevented the invasion fleet was from departing from the naval port of Hellevoetsluis, and Catholics all over the Netherlands and the British kingdoms held prayer sessions that this "popish wind" might endure. However, on 14/24 October, it became the famous "Protestant Wind" by turning to the east.

=== Crossing and landing ===
1688 Invasion of England
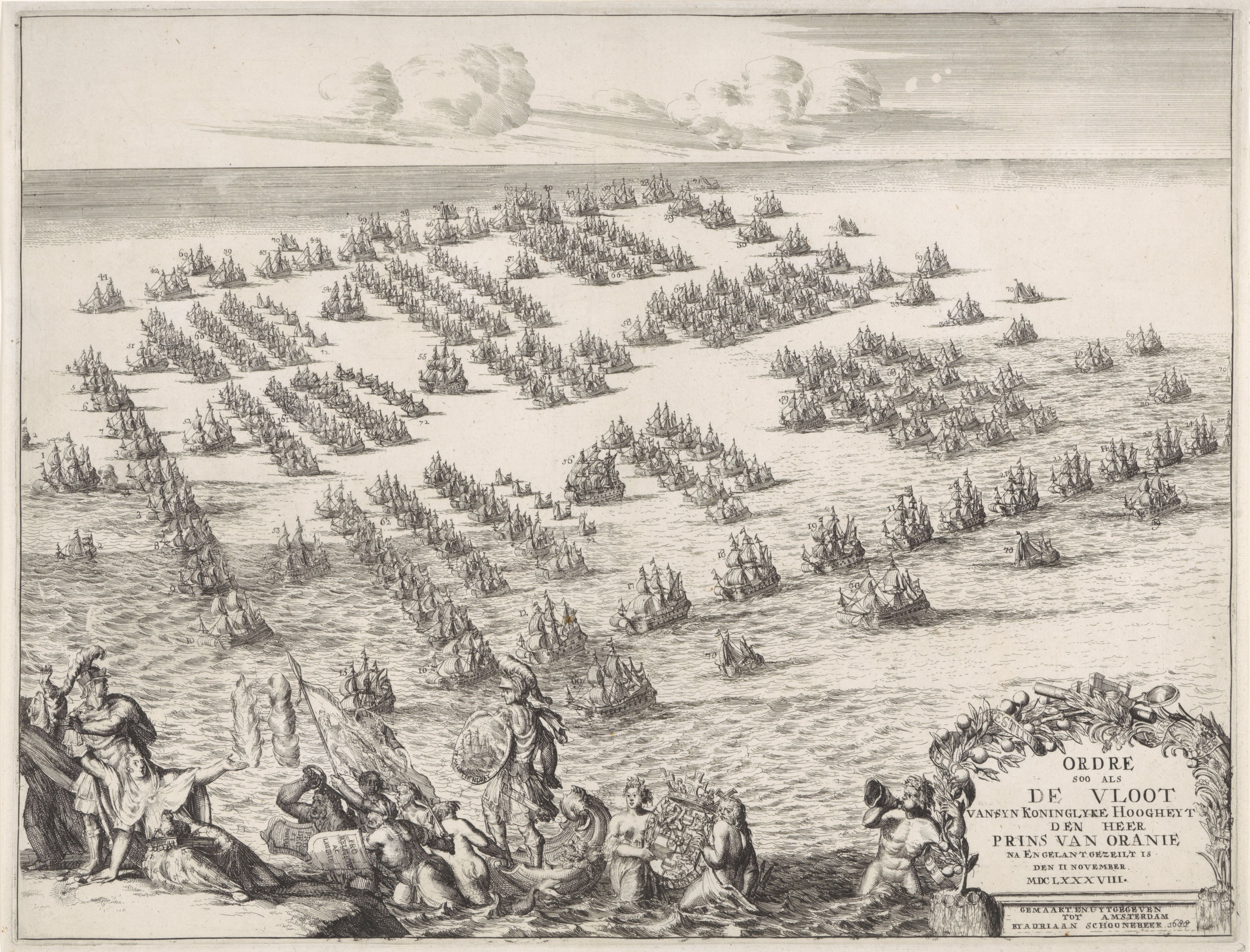
- The sailing order of the Dutch fleet
Date	November – December 1688
Location	North Sea, English Channel and England

Belligerents
Dutch Republic; Williamites	(Kingdom of England) England

Commanders and leaders
(Dutch Republic) William III (Dutch Republic) Schomberg (Dutch Republic) Herbert (Dutch Republic) Evertsen (Dutch Republic) Almonde	James II; Feversham; Churchill; Dartmouth

Strength
Army strength 16,000-21,000 men Naval strength 49 Man-of-war >400 smaller vessels	Army strength 30,000 men Naval strength 31 Man-of-war several smaller vessels

Casualties and losses
low	low

Although most of the warships were provided by the Admiralty of Amsterdam, officially the States General treated the operation as a private affair, allowing William use of the Dutch States Navy and army. The nominal commander was Arthur Herbert, but operational control remained with Lieutenant-Admiral Cornelis Evertsen the Youngest and Vice-Admiral Philips van Almonde. Accompanied by Willem Bastiaensz Schepers, the Rotterdam shipping magnate who provided financing, William boarded the frigate Den Briel on 16/26 October.

With over 400 ships of various types carrying 40,000 men, the expeditionary force was the largest fleet assembled in European waters up to that date. (Note: There were seventy-five vessels of the confederated Dutch navy. Forty-nine were warships of more than twenty cannon. Eight of these could count as third rates of 60–68 cannon. Additionally, there were nine frigates, twenty-eight galliots, and nine fireships. Transports included seventy-six fluyts for the soldiers, one hundred and twenty small transports with five thousand horses, and about seventy supply vessels. Also, sixty fishing vessels served as landing craft.) After departing on 19/29 October, the fleet was scattered by a gale, forcing the Briel back to Hellevoetsluis on 21/31 October. William refused to go ashore, and the fleet reassembled, having lost only one ship but nearly a thousand horses; press reports deliberately exaggerated the damage and claimed the expedition might be postponed until next spring.

Dartmouth and his senior commanders considered taking advantage of this by blockading Hellevoetsluis, then decided against it, partly because the stormy weather made it dangerous but also because they could not rely on their men. William replaced his losses and departed when the wind changed on 1/11 November, this time heading for Harwich where Bentinck had prepared a landing site. It has been suggested this was a feint to divert some of Dartmouth's ships north, which proved to be the case and when the wind shifted again, the Dutch armada sailed south into the Strait of Dover. In doing so, they twice passed the English fleet, which was unable to intercept because of the adverse winds and tides.

With the French fleet absent in the Mediterranean, on 3/13 November, the fleet entered the English Channel in a formation 25 ships deep. Intended to awe observers with its size and power, the troops were lined up on deck, firing musket volleys, colours flying and military bands playing. The same wind blowing the Dutch down the Channel trapped Dartmouth in the Thames estuary, leaving him unable to prevent William reaching Torbay on 5 November.

The Dutch fleet at Torbay

Bad weather obliged Dartmouth to anchor in Portsmouth for two days, allowing William to complete his disembarkation undisturbed. Most estimates suggest his force consisted of around 15,000 regular troops, (Note: Made up of 11,000 infantry, including nearly 5,000 members of the elite Anglo-Scots Brigade and Dutch Blue Guards, 3,660 cavalry and an artillery train of twenty-one 24-pounder cannon.) plus up to 5,000 volunteers, mostly British exiles and French Huguenots. (Note: Their number is disputed, one recent historian pitting it at around 1,200. 600 British and 600 French.) He also brought weapons to equip another 20,000 men, although the subsequent collapse of James's army meant most local volunteers were quickly sent home.

== The collapse of James's rule ==
Key locations in November 1688

James had considered himself safe from invasion, due to the French threat to the Spanish Netherlands, his navy and because it was late in the year for launching an expedition. He now panicked and met with the bishops on 28 September, offering them concessions. They responded five days later with demands that he restore the religious position to that prevailing in February 1685, and hold free elections for a new Parliament. Although they hoped this would allow James to remain king, in reality there was little chance of this. At a minimum, he would have to disinherit his son, enforce the Test Acts, and accept the supremacy of Parliament, all of which were unacceptable. In addition, by now his Whig opponents did not trust him to keep his promises, while Tories like Danby were too committed to William to escape punishment.

Although his veterans were superior to the largely untested recruits of the Royal Army, William and his English supporters preferred to avoid bloodshed. Torbay was sufficiently far from London to provide time for the regime to collapse on its own, while to avoid alienating the local population, his troops were well supplied and paid three months in advance. On 9 November, he entered Exeter and issued a proclamation claiming he sought only to secure the rights of his wife and a free Parliament. Despite this, there was little enthusiasm for either party, and the general mood was one of confusion and distrust. In Northern England, much of the gentry confirmed their backing for the invasion after Danby had the Declaration read out in York on 12 November.

On 19 November, James joined his main force of 19,000 at Salisbury, but morale was low and the loyalty of some commanders doubtful, with a number of officers defecting to William between 10 and 20 November. Although the numbers were relatively small, the defections badly impacted morale, and the Royal Army was short of both food and ammunition. On 20 November, Royal dragoons clashed with Williamite scouts at Wincanton, but along with a minor skirmish at Reading on 9 December, these were the only substantial military actions of the campaign. After securing his rear by taking Plymouth on 18 November, William began his advance on 21 November, while Danby and Belasyse captured York and Hull several days later.

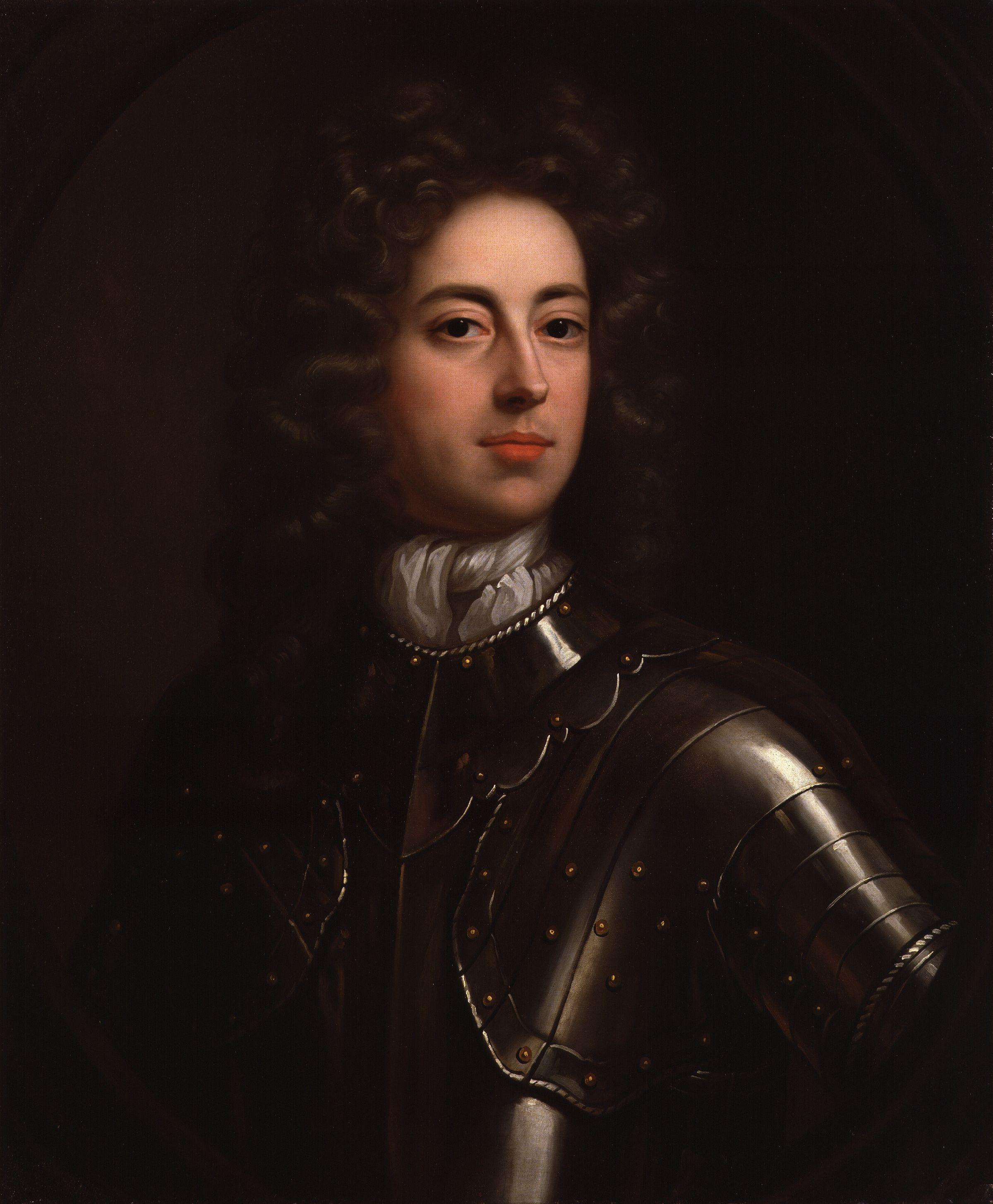
John Churchill, c. 1685, whose defection to William was a serious blow

His commander Feversham and other senior officers advised James to retreat. Lacking information on William's movements, suspicious of his own soldiers, worn out by lack of sleep and debilitating nose-bleeds, on 23 November James agreed. Because of its strategic implications, the withdrawal was a practical admission of defeat. On 24 November, Churchill, Grafton and Princess Anne's husband George deserted to William, followed by Anne herself on 26 November. The next day, James met with those peers still in London, and with the exception of Melfort, Perth and other Catholics, they urged him to announce free Parliamentary elections and negotiate with William.

On 8 December, Halifax, Nottingham and Godolphin met with William at Hungerford to hear his demands, which included the dismissal of Catholics from public office and funding for his army. Many viewed these as a reasonable basis for a settlement, but James decided to flee the country, convinced his life was threatened. This suggestion is generally dismissed by historians, since William had made it clear he would not allow his uncle to be harmed. Some Tories hoped James could retain his throne but name a Protestant successor, while the Whigs preferred to drive him out of the country by imposing conditions he would refuse.

The Queen and Prince of Wales left for France on 9 December, James following separately on 10 December. Accompanied only by Edward Hales and Ralph Sheldon, he made his way to Faversham in Kent seeking passage to France, first dropping the Great Seal in the River Thames in a last-ditch attempt to prevent Parliament being summoned. In London, his flight and rumours of a "Papist" invasion led to riots and destruction of Catholic property, which quickly spread throughout the country. To fill the power vacuum, the Earl of Rochester set up a temporary government including members of the Privy Council and City of London authorities, but it took them two days to restore order.

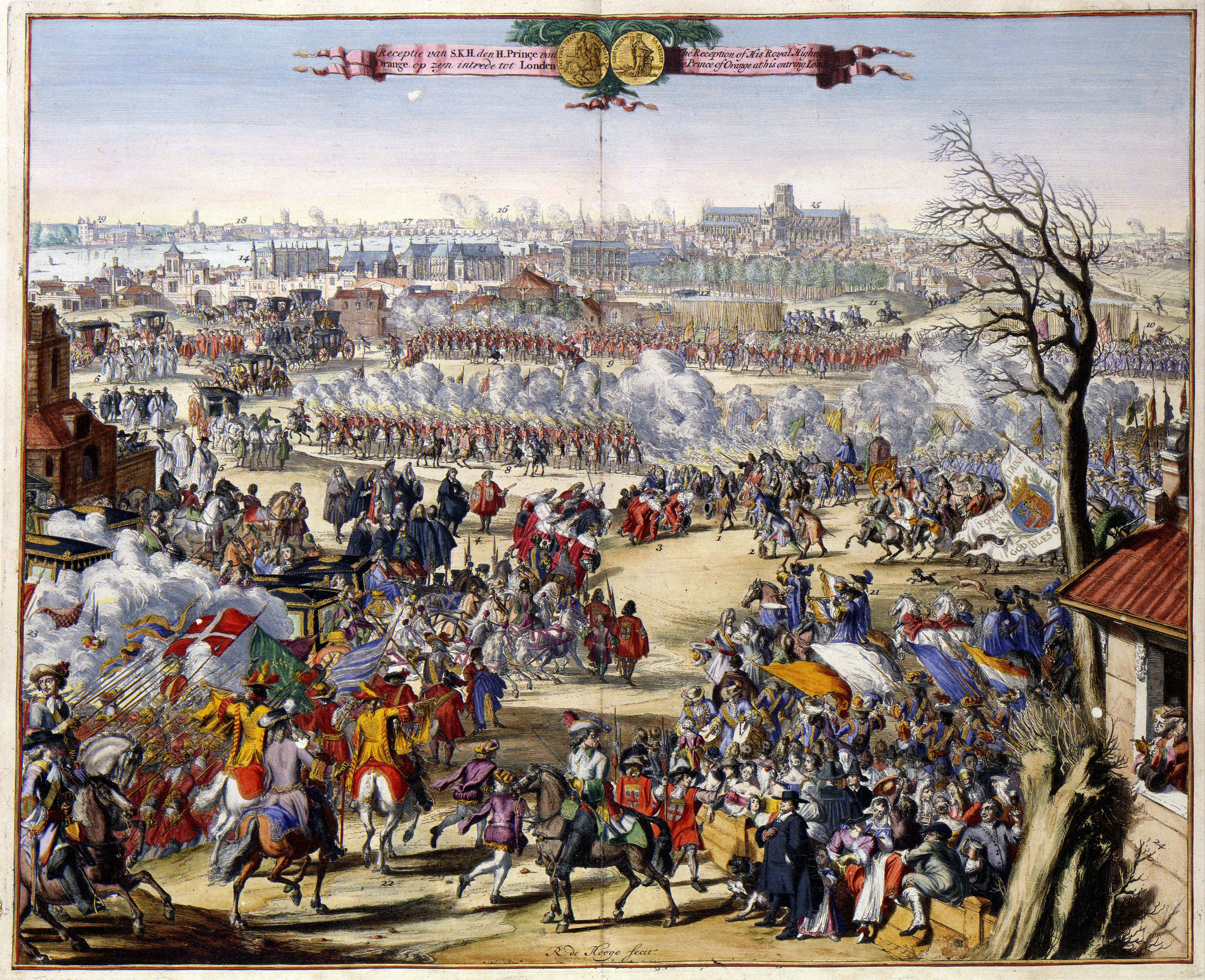
The entrance of William in London, 16 December 1688

When news arrived that James had been captured in Faversham on 11 December by local fishermen, Lord Ailesbury, one of his personal attendants, was sent to escort him back to London. On entering the city on 16 December, he was welcomed by cheering crowds. By making it seem that James remained in control, Tory loyalists hoped for a settlement which would leave them in government. To create an appearance of normality, he heard Mass and presided over a meeting of the Privy Council. (Note: Those in attendance were William Hamilton, Duke of Hamilton, William Craven, 1st Earl of Craven, George Berkeley, 1st Earl of Berkeley, Charles Middleton, 2nd Earl of Middleton (Southern Secretary), Richard Graham, 1st Viscount Preston (Lord President of the Council and Northern Secretary), Sidney Godolphin, 1st Earl of Godolphin (Chamberlain to the Queen and Treasury Commissioner), John Trevor, Master of the Rolls, and Silius Titus.) James made it clear to the French ambassador Paul Barillon that he still intended to escape to France. His few remaining supporters viewed his flight as cowardice, and a failure to ensure law and order criminally negligent.

Happy to help him into exile, William recommended he relocate to Ham, largely because it was easy to escape from. James suggested Rochester instead, allegedly because his personal guard was there, in reality conveniently positioned for a ship to France. On 18 December, he left London with a Dutch escort as William entered, cheered by the same crowds who had greeted James two days before. William occupied London and now effectively controlled the English government and the country's army, navy, and finances. On 22 December, Berwick arrived in Rochester with blank passports allowing them to leave England, while his guards were instructed not to impede his escape. Although Ailesbury and others begged him to stay, James left for France on 23 December.

== The revolutionary settlement ==
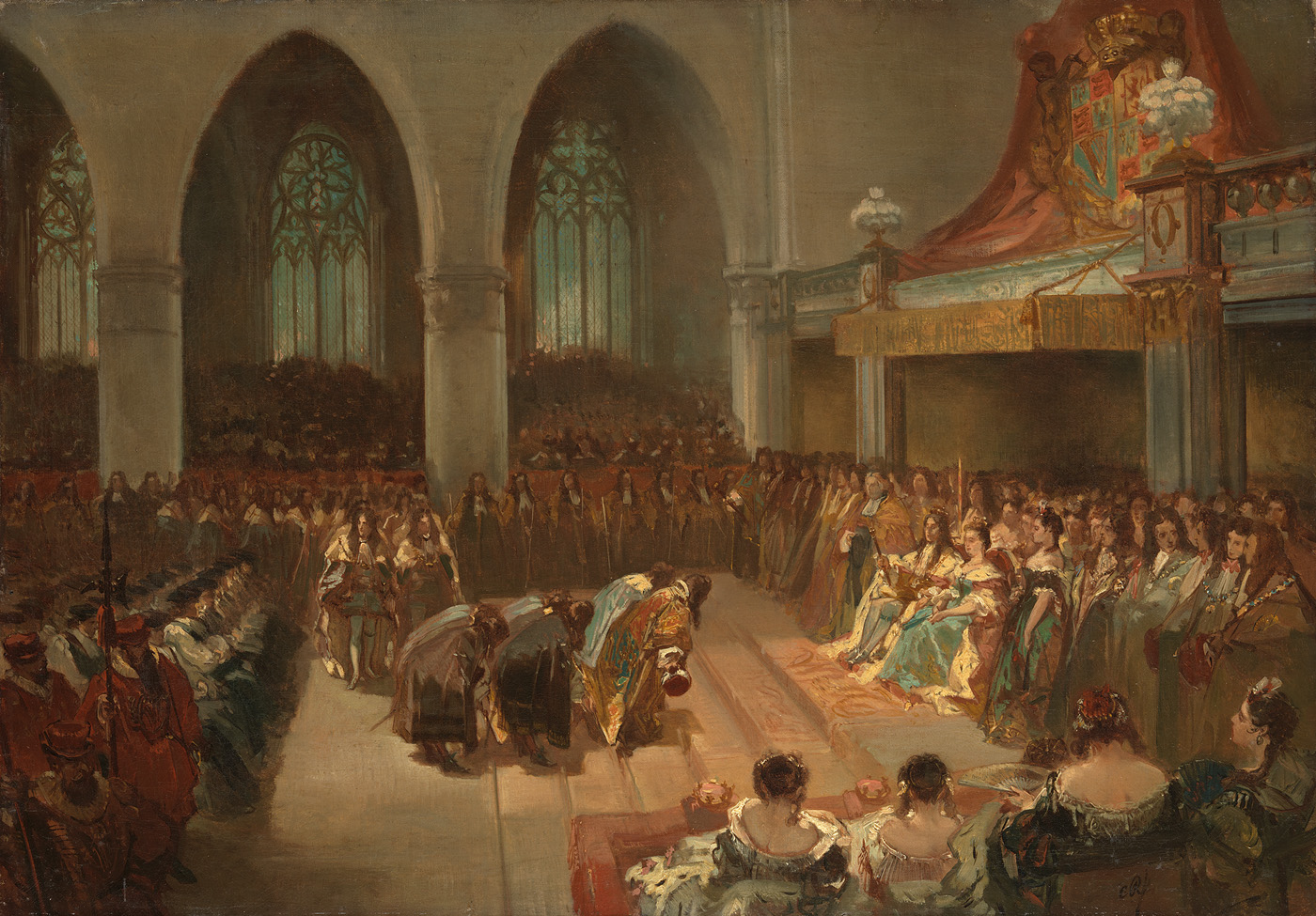
The coronation of William and Mary, by Charles Rochussen. William III and Mary II reigned jointly until her death in 1694, when William became sole monarch.

James' departure enabled William to take control of the provisional government on 28 December. Elections were held in early January for a Convention Parliament, which assembled on 22 January. While the Whigs had a slight majority in the Commons, the Lords was dominated by the Tories, but both were led by moderates. Even Stuart loyalists like Archbishop Sancroft recognised keeping James on the throne was no longer possible. Instead, they argued his daughter Mary should be appointed either regent, or sole monarch.

The issue was debated for next two weeks, much to the annoyance of William, who needed a swift resolution. The situation in Ireland was rapidly deteriorating, while the French had over-run large parts of the Rhineland and were preparing to attack the Dutch. At a meeting with Danby and Halifax on 3 February, he declared he would return home if the Convention did not appoint him joint monarch, while Mary stated she would only rule jointly with her husband. Faced with this ultimatum, on 6 February Parliament declared that in choosing exile, James had abdicated and thus vacated the Crown, which was therefore offered jointly to William and Mary.

Historian Tim Harris argues the most radical act of the 1688 Revolution was the idea of a "contract" between ruler and people, rebutting the Stuart ideology of divine right. While this was a victory for the Whigs, other pieces of legislation were proposed by the Tories, often with moderate Whig support, designed to protect the Anglican establishment from being undermined by future monarchs, including the Calvinist William. The Declaration of Right was a tactical compromise, setting out where James had failed, and establishing the rights of English citizens, without agreeing their cause or offering solutions. In December 1689, this was incorporated into the Bill of Rights.

However, there were two areas that arguably broke new constitutional ground, both responses to what were viewed as specific abuses by James. First, the Declaration of Right made keeping a standing army without parliamentary consent illegal, overturning the 1661 and 1662 Militia Acts and vesting control of the military in Parliament, not the Crown. The second was the Coronation Oath Act 1688; the result of James's perceived failure to comply with that taken in 1685, it established obligations owed by the monarchy to the people.

At their coronation on 11 April, William and Mary swore to "govern the people of this kingdom of England, and the dominions thereunto belonging, according to the statutes in Parliament agreed on, and the laws and customs of the same". They were also to maintain the Protestant Reformed faith and "preserve inviolable the settlement of the Church of England, and its doctrine, worship, discipline and government as by law established".

=== Scotland ===
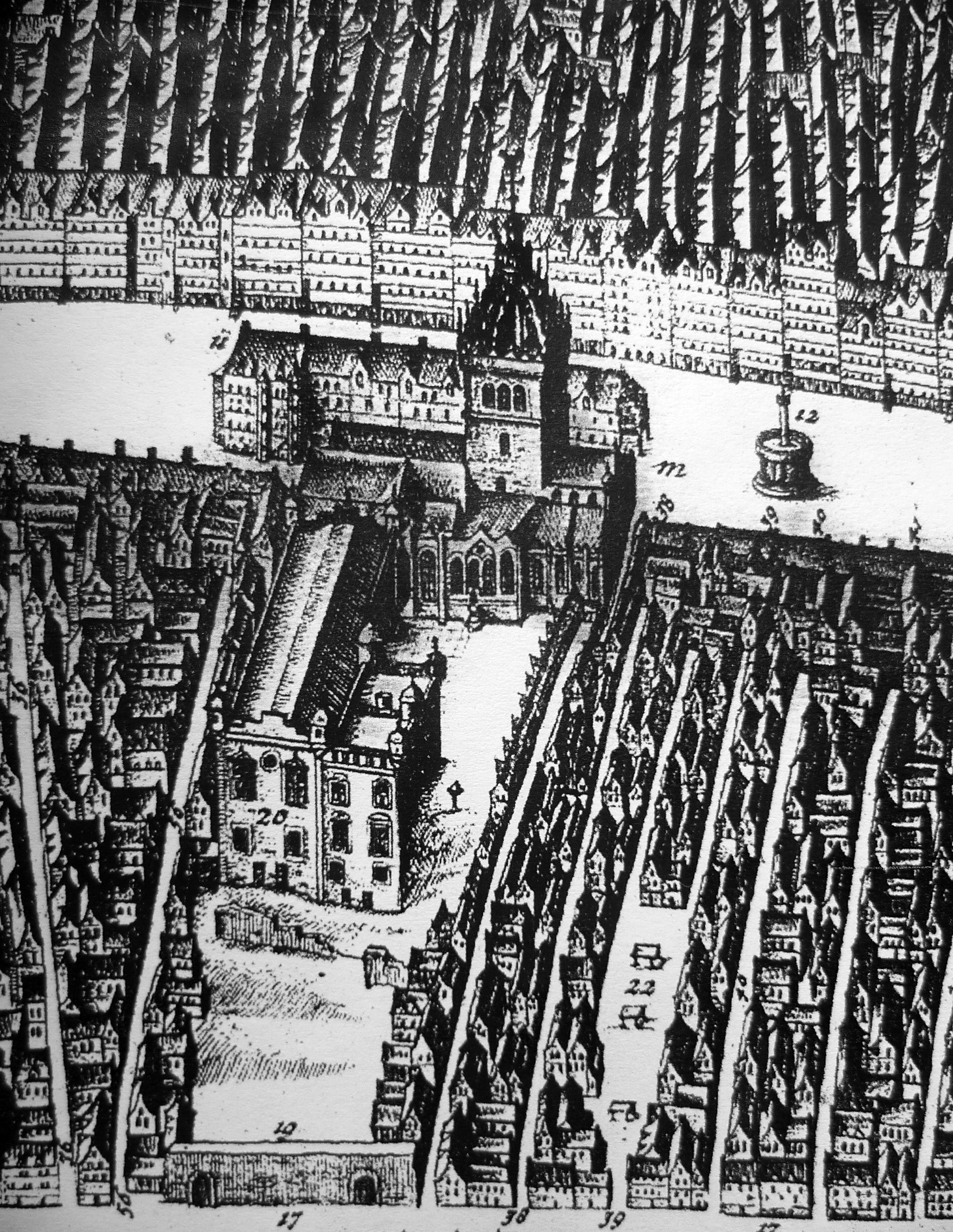
Parliament House, Edinburgh, where the Convention of Estates met in March 1689

While Scotland was not involved in the landing, by November 1688 only a tiny minority supported James. Many of those who accompanied William were Scots exiles, including the Earl of Melville, the Duke of Argyll, his personal chaplain William Carstares and Gilbert Burnet. News of James's flight led to celebrations and anti-Catholic riots in Edinburgh and Glasgow. Most members of the Scottish Privy Council went to London. On 7 January 1689, they asked William to take over government. Elections were held in March for a Scottish Convention, which was also a contest between Presbyterians and Episcopalians for control of the Kirk. While only 50 of the 125 delegates were classed as Episcopalian, they were hopeful of victory since William supported the retention of bishops.

On 16 March a Letter from James was read out to the convention, demanding obedience and threatening punishment for non-compliance. Public anger at its tone meant some Episcopalians stopped attending the convention, claiming to fear for their safety, and others changed sides. The 1689–1691 Jacobite Rising forced William to make concessions to the Presbyterians, ended Episcopacy in Scotland and excluded a significant portion of the political class. Many later returned to the Kirk but Non-Juring Episcopalianism was the key determinant of Jacobite support in 1715 and 1745.

The English Parliament held that James 'abandoned' his throne. The Convention argued that he 'forfeited' it by his actions, as listed in the Articles of Grievances. On 11 April, the Convention ended James's reign and adopted the Articles of Grievances and the Claim of Right Act, making Parliament the primary legislative power in Scotland. On 11 May, William and Mary accepted the Crown of Scotland; after their acceptance, the Claim and the Articles were read aloud, leading to an immediate debate over whether or not an endorsement of these documents was implicit in that acceptance.

=== Ireland ===
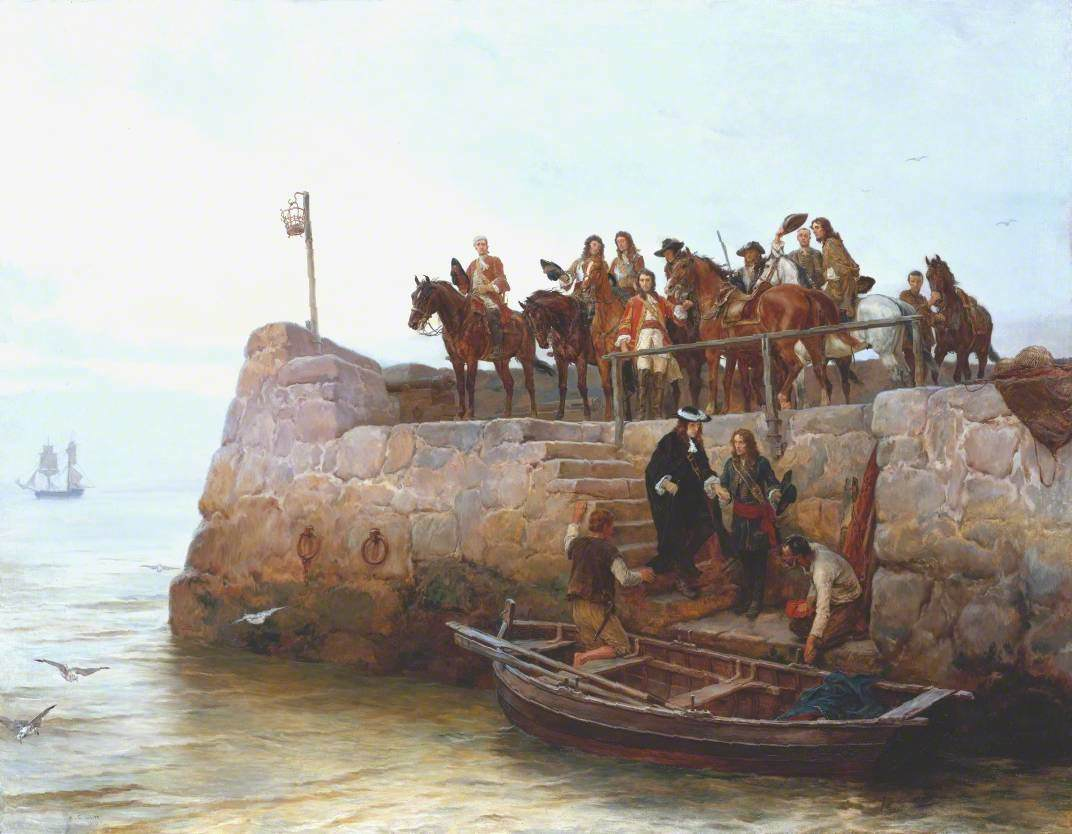
A Lost Cause by Andrew Carrick Gow, 1888. James II departing for France from Kinsale following the Battle of the Boyne in 1690.

After his flight from England in December 1688, James II had been given refuge by Louis XIV, who provided him financial and diplomatic assistance. Accompanied by 6,000 French troops, on 12 March 1689 he landed in Ireland, where he was backed by the majority Catholic population. His supporters were known as "Jacobites", and the war in Ireland was accompanied by a rising in Scotland. For James, the main objective was to retake England and thus he viewed both Scotland and Ireland as strategic dead ends. On the other hand, Louis saw them as an opportunity to divert British resources from the Low Countries, a difference in aims that was never adequately resolved.

James' Catholic deputy, the Earl of Tyrconnell, had raised an Army of around 36,000, although many were poorly equipped and it was almost impossible to feed, pay and supply so many. Although they quickly occupied much of Ireland, including largely Protestant Ulster, they were unable to capture the key northern port of Derry and were forced to retreat at the end of July. In August, Williamite general Schomberg landed in Belfast Lough with 15,000 reinforcements, but logistics failures meant his army stalled at Dundalk and suffered heavily from sickness and desertion.

The Scottish Jacobites suffered heavy losses in securing victory at Killiecrankie in July 1689, including their leader Viscount Dundee. By May 1690 the rising had been largely suppressed, although pockets of resistance continued in the Highlands until early 1692. At the same time, William III assumed command of government troops in Ireland and gained an important success at the Battle of the Boyne in July 1690, before their naval victory at Beachy Head gave the French temporary control of the English Channel. James returned to France to urge an immediate invasion of England, but the Anglo-Dutch fleet soon regained maritime supremacy, and no invasion was launched.

By the end of 1690, French and Jacobite troops were confined to the south and west of Ireland. Although repulsed with heavy losses at Limerick in September, William transferred command to Godert de Ginkel and returned to Flanders. Despite receiving reinforcements and a new general in the Marquis de St Ruth, the Franco-Irish army was defeated at Aughrim on 12 July 1691; the war in Ireland ended with the Treaty of Limerick in October, allowing the bulk of the Williamite forces to be shipped to the Low Countries.

== Anglo-Dutch alliance ==
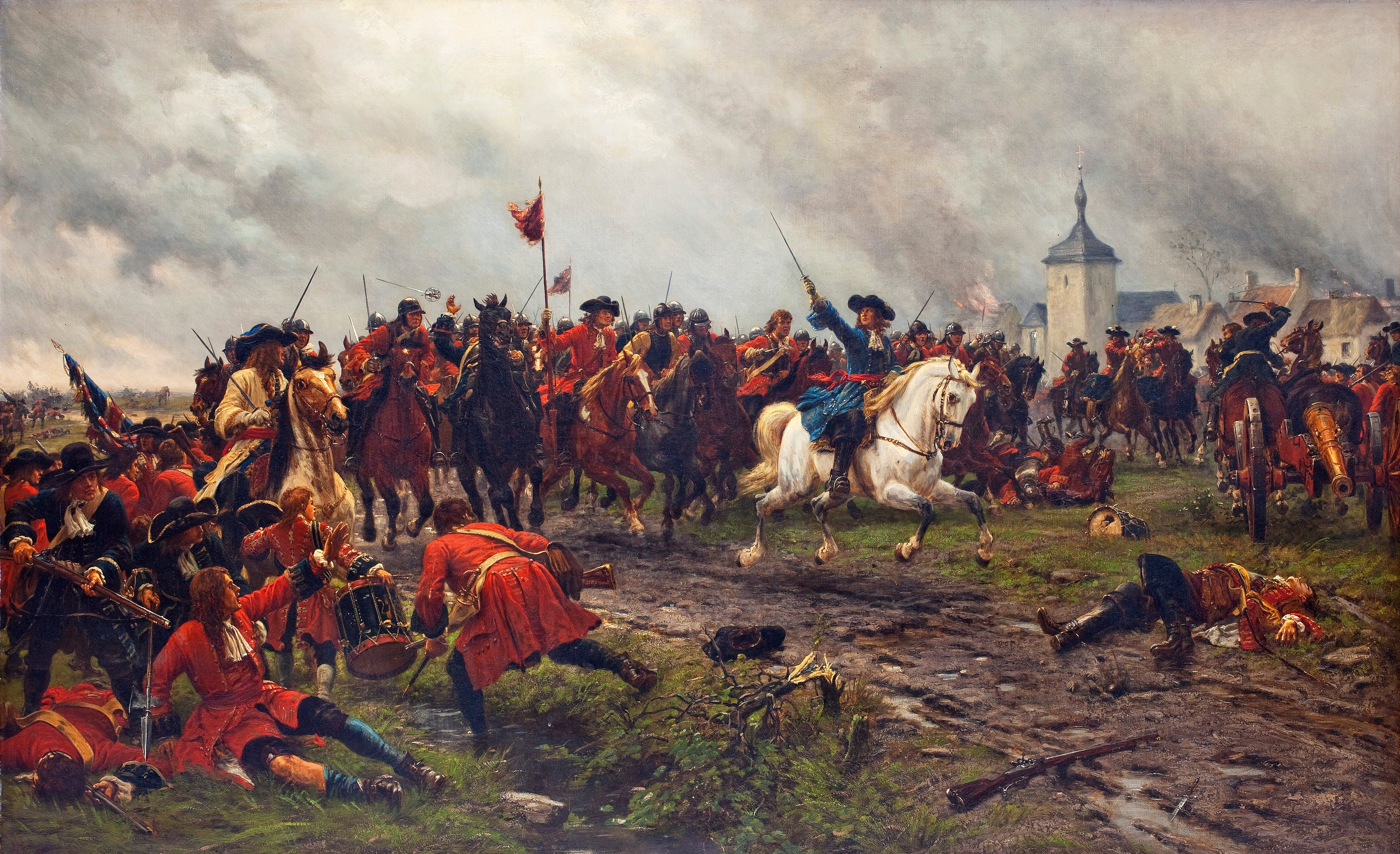
William III at the Battle of Landen in 1693, by Ernest Crofts

Though he had carefully avoided making it public, William's main motive in organising the expedition had been the opportunity to bring England into an alliance against France. On 9 December 1688 he had already asked the States General to send a delegation of three to negotiate the conditions. On 18 February (Old Style) he asked the convention to support the Republic in its war against France. It refused, only consenting to pay £600,000 for the continued presence of the 17,000 Dutch troops in England. On 9 March (New Style) the States General responded to Louis's earlier declaration of war by declaring war on France in return.

Before British forces could effectively take part in the war, the English army had to be reorganised. James' commander-in-chief Louis de Duras, Earl of Feversham, had disbanded the English army in December 1688 so it had to be effectively rebuilt from scratch. Many officers were unwilling to continue under William, while William was reluctant to trust those who had not already served under him. In addition, according to historian Jonathan Scott: "The state and discipline of the rank and file was 'deplorable'. There was a dire lack of experience and competence at every level." For the purpose of reforming the English army on the Dutch model William appointed Dutch officers to key positions.

The English elite also failed to secure the most important governmental posts, while English Secretaries of State primarily served as executors rather than architects of foreign policy. The development of foreign policy was largely directed by William III and Anthonie Heinsius, who assumed the role of Grand Pensionary of Holland following Fagel's death in late 1688. This situation caused considerable resentment in England.

On 19 April (Old Style) the Dutch delegation signed a naval treaty with England. It stipulated that the combined Anglo-Dutch fleet would always be commanded by an Englishman, even when of lower rank. The Dutch agreed to this to make their dominance over the English army more acceptable for the British. The treaty also specified that the two parties would contribute in the ratio of five English vessels against three Dutch vessels, meaning in practice that the Dutch navy in the future would be smaller than the English, something that caused considerable unease in the Dutch Republic. The Navigation Acts were not repealed. On 18 May, the new Parliament allowed William to declare war on France. On 9 September 1689, (New Style), William as King of England joined the League of Augsburg against France.

=== The decline of the Dutch Republic ===
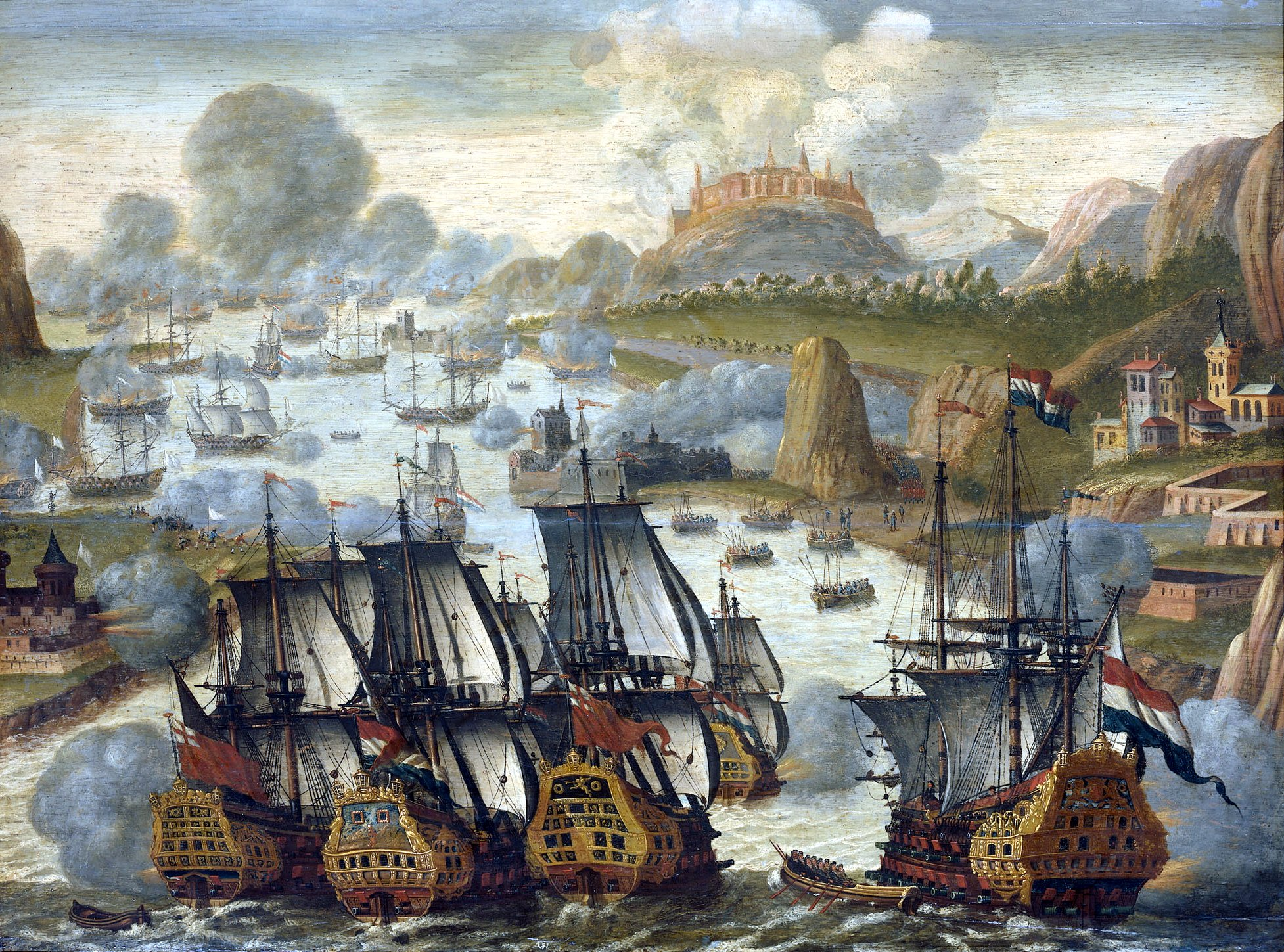
Dutch and English ships at the Battle of Vigo Bay, 1702

Having England as an ally meant that the military situation of the Republic was strongly improved, which allowed William to be uncompromising in his position towards France. The Dutch successfully secured and expanded their positions in the Spanish Netherlands, while halting French territorial expansion, but these military campaigns were very expensive. In 1712, at the end of the War of the Spanish Succession, the Republic was financially exhausted and was forced to let its fleet deteriorate, which played a role in Britain becoming the preeminent global maritime power.

The Dutch economy, already burdened by the high national debt and concomitant high taxation, suffered from the other European states' protectionist policies, which its weakened fleet was no longer able to resist. To make matters worse, the main Dutch trading and banking houses moved much of their activity from Amsterdam to London after 1688. Between 1688 and 1720, world trade dominance shifted from the Republic to Great Britain.

== Assessment and historiography ==
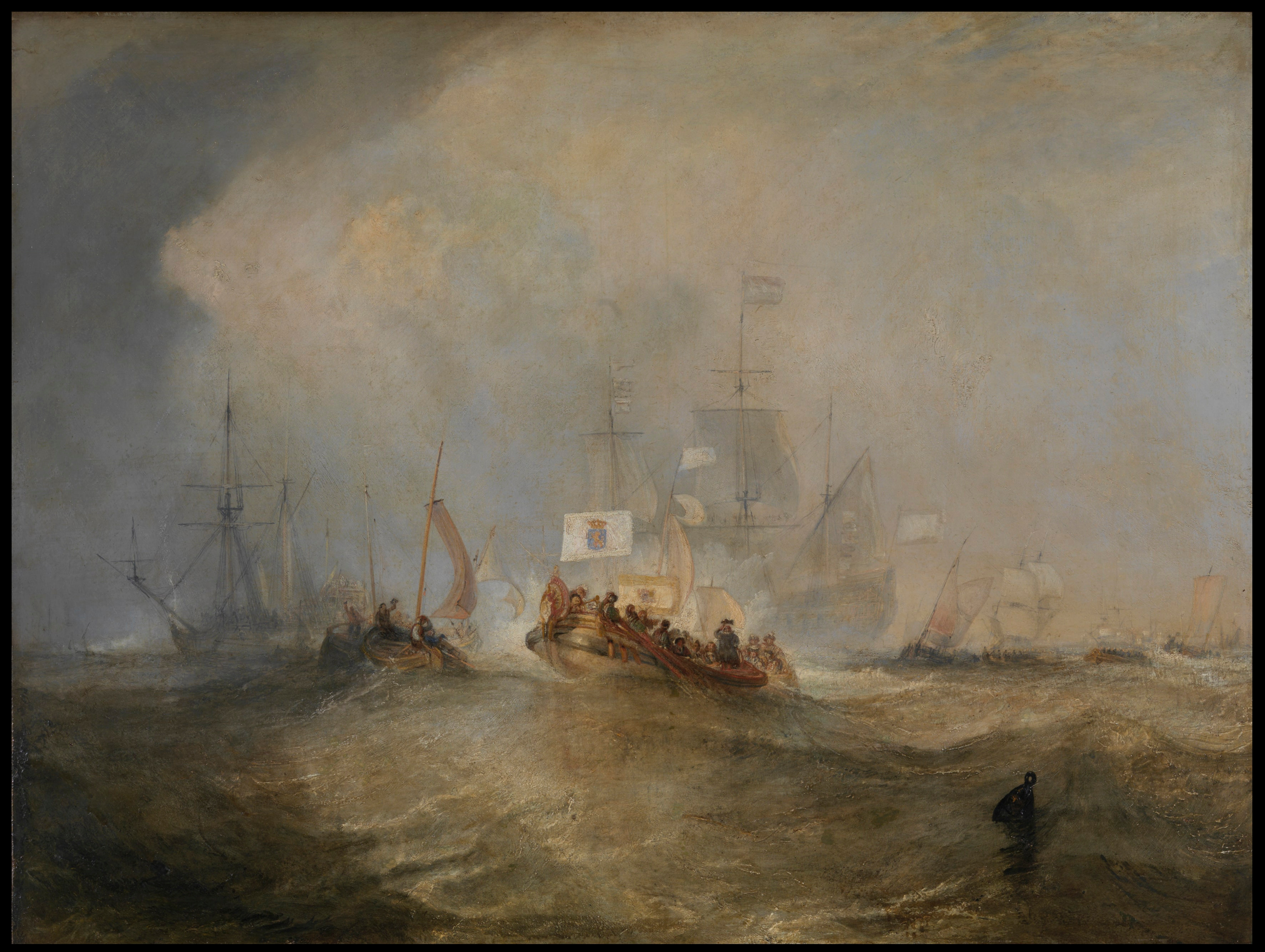
The Prince of Orange Landing at Torbay by J. M. W. Turner, 1832

While the 1688 revolution was labeled "Glorious" by Protestant preachers two decades later, its historiography is complex, and its assessment disputed. Thomas Macaulay's account of the Revolution in The History of England from the Accession of James the Second exemplifies the "Whig history" narrative of the Revolution as a largely consensual and bloodless triumph of English common sense, confirming and strengthening its institutions of tempered popular liberty and limited monarchy. Edmund Burke set the tone for that interpretation when he proclaimed: "The Revolution was made to preserve our ancient indisputable laws and liberties, and that ancient constitution of government which is our only security for law and liberty."

An alternative narrative emphasizes William's successful foreign invasion from the Netherlands, and the size of the corresponding military operation. Several researchers have emphasized that aspect, particularly after the third centenary of the event in 1988. The historian J. R. Jones suggested that the invasion "should be seen ... as the first and arguably the only decisive phase of the Nine Years' War." John Childs added that "there was no natural political turmoil in England in 1688", or "at least not of sufficient consequence to produce the overthrow of a king." Jonathan Israel also stresses the importance of the Dutch aspect by arguing that, due to the Dutch occupation of London, parliament was hardly free when they decided to accept William as their king.

It has been argued that the invasion aspect had been downplayed as a result of British pride and effective Dutch propaganda, trying to depict the course of events as a largely internal English affair. As the invitation was initiated by figures who had little influence, the legacy of the Glorious Revolution has been described as a successful propaganda act by William to cover up and justify his invasion. The claim that William was fighting for the Protestant cause in England was used to great effect to disguise the military, cultural and political impact that the Dutch regime had on England.

Expeditionary Banner used by William of Orange as Commander-in-Chief

A third version, proposed by Steven Pincus, underplays the invasion aspect but unlike the Whig narrative views the Revolution as a divisive and violent event that involved all classes of the English population, not just the main aristocratic protagonists. Pincus argues that his interpretation echoes the widely held view of the Revolution in its aftermath, starting with its revolutionary labelling. Pincus argues that it was momentous especially when looking at the alternative that James was trying to enact – a powerful centralised autocratic state, using French-style "state-building". England's role in Europe and the country's political economy in the 17th century rebuts the view of many late-20th-century historians that nothing revolutionary occurred during the Glorious Revolution of 1688–89. Pincus says it was not a placid turn of events.

In diplomacy and economics William III transformed the English state's ideology and policies. This occurred not because William III was an outsider who inflicted foreign notions on England but because foreign affairs and political economy were at the core of the English revolutionaries' agenda. The revolution of 1688–89 cannot be fathomed in isolation. It would have been inconceivable without the changes resulting from the events of the 1640s and 1650s. The ideas accompanying the Glorious Revolution were rooted in the mid-century upheavals. The 17th century was a century of revolution in England, deserving of the same scholarly attention that 'modern' revolutions attract.

James II tried building a powerful militarised state on the mercantilist assumption that the world's wealth was necessarily finite, and empires were created by taking land from other states. The East India Company was thus an ideal tool to create a vast new English imperial dominion by warring with the Dutch and the Mughal Empire in India. After 1689 came an alternative understanding of economics, which saw Britain as a commercial rather than an agrarian society. It led to the foundation of the Bank of England, the creation of Europe's first widely circulating credit currency and the commencement of the "Age of Projectors". This subsequently gave weight to the view, advocated most famously by Adam Smith in 1776, that wealth was created by human endeavour and was thus potentially infinite.

Karl Marx viewed the revolution as essentially conservative in nature, writing that it was shaped by an alliance between English commercial and industrial bourgeoisie and increasingly commercialized large land owners.

=== Impact ===
As a coup, albeit largely bloodless, its legitimacy rests in the will expressed separately by the Scottish and English Parliaments according to their respective legal processes. On this point, the Earl of Shaftesbury declared in 1689, "The Parliament of England is that supreme and absolute power, which gives life and motion to the English government". The Revolution established the primacy of parliamentary sovereignty, a principle still relevant in consultation with the 15 Commonwealth realms regarding succession issues. The Bill of Rights 1689 formally established a system of constitutional monarchy and ended moves towards absolute monarchy by restricting the power of the monarch, who could no longer suspend laws, levy taxes, make royal appointments or maintain a standing army during peacetime without Parliament's consent. The British Army remains the military arm of Parliament, not the monarch, although the Crown is the source of all military executive authority.

Unlike the 1639 to 1653 Wars of the Three Kingdoms, most ordinary people in England and Scotland were relatively untouched by the "Glorious Revolution", the majority of the bloodshed taking place in Ireland. As a consequence, some historians suggest that in England at least it more closely resembles a coup d'état, rather than a social upheaval such as the French Revolution. (Note: The importance of the event has divided historians ever since Friedrich Engels judged it "a relatively puny event".) This view is consistent with the original meaning of "revolution" as a circular process under which an old system of values is restored to its original position, with England's supposed "ancient constitution" being reasserted, rather than formed anew. Contemporary English political thought, as expressed in John Locke's then popular social contract theory, linked to George Buchanan's view of the contractual agreement between the monarch and their subjects, an argument used by the Scottish Parliament as justification for the Claim of Right.

Under the Coronation Oath Act 1688, William had sworn to maintain the primacy of the Church of England, which both his native Dutch Reformed Church and the Church of Scotland viewed as ideologically suspect in both doctrine and use of bishops. This required a certain degree of religious flexibility on his part, especially as he needed to placate his Catholic allies, Spain and Emperor Leopold. Despite promising legal toleration for Catholics in his Declaration of October 1688, William failed due to domestic opposition. The Act of Toleration 1689 granted relief to Nonconformists but Catholic emancipation would be delayed until 1829.

News of the Glorious Revolution reached the English colonies in North America in 1689, leading to a revolt in Boston and the dissolution of the Dominion of New England. Notably, the Glorious Revolution's principles influenced later human rights frameworks, including the United Nations Universal Declaration of Human Rights and the European Convention on Human Rights.

== See also ==
- Democracy in Europe
- 1689 Boston revolt
- Protestant Revolution (Maryland)
