= Cromwell at Dunbar =

Painting by Andrew Carrick Gow

- Artist: Andrew Carrick Gow
- Year: 1886
- Type: Oil on canvas, history painting
- Dimensions: 120.6 cm × 151.1 cm (47.5 in × 59.5 in)
- Location: Tate Britain, London

Cromwell at Dunbar is an 1886 history painting by the English artist Andrew Carrick Gow. It depicts the British general and future Lord Protector of the Commonwealth Oliver Cromwell at the Battle of Dunbar on 3 September 1650 during the War of the Three Kingdoms. The battle was a decisive victory for the New Model Army over the Scottish Covenanters.

Today the painting is in the collection of the Tate Britain in London, having been acquired through the Chantrey Bequest the same year.

== Bibliography ==
- Fyfe, Gordon. Art, Power and Modernity: English Art Institutions, 1750-1950. A&C Black, 2001.
- Johnston, Aaaron Paul. 'Essential Agony': The Battle of Dunbar 1650. Helion Limited, 2019.
- Reese, Peter. Cromwell's Masterstroke: Dunbar 1650. Pen and Sword, 2006.
