= Andrew Carrick Gow =

British artist (1848–1920)

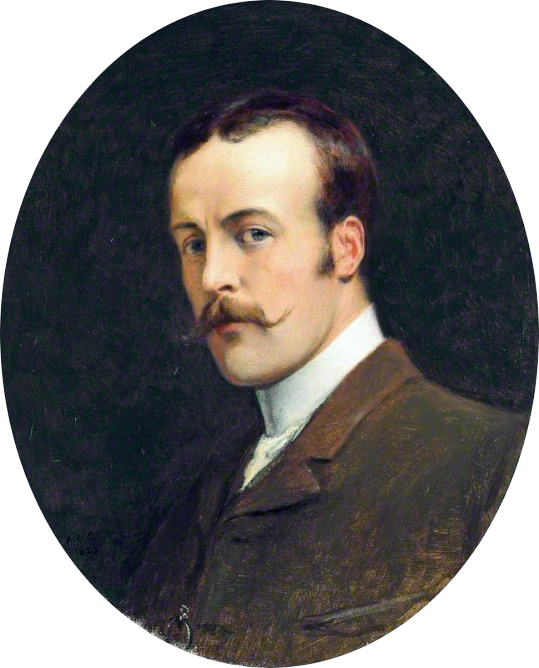
- Self-portrait at the age of 35 (1883)
- Born: 15 or 18 June 1848; Islington, London, England
- Died: 1 February 1920 (aged 71); London, England
- Elected: Member of the Royal Academy, 1890

Andrew Carrick Gow RA (15 or 18 June 1848 – 1 February 1920) was a British painter who painted scenes from British and European history as well as portraits and genre.

== Biography ==
Born in London in 1848, Gow studied at Heatherley's School of Art. He was a regular exhibitor at the Royal Academy, and elsewhere from 1867 onwards, and in 1881, he was elected an Associate of the Royal Academy, becoming a full Royal Academician in 1891. In 1900, he visited Egypt and he used his sketches to compose a scene representing the death of the Mahdi soon after the defeat of his troops by Colonel Wingate in 1898.

Gow's sister, Mary Gow, was also an artist, and the artist Lawrence Alma-Tadema was a close friend.

In later life, he became Keeper of the Royal Academy and died there on 1 February 1920 at the age of 72. He was buried on the western side of Highgate Cemetery.

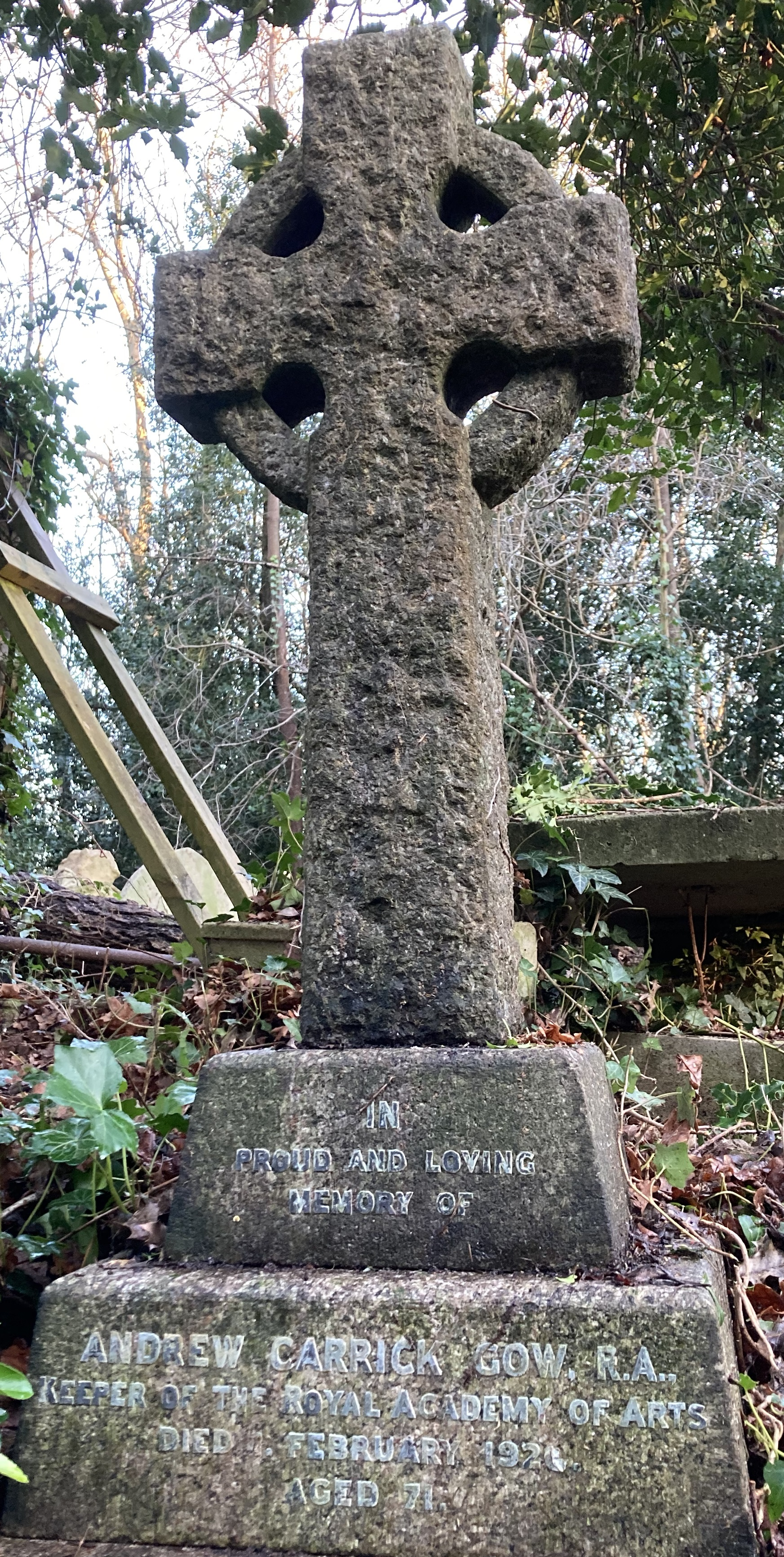
Grave of Andrew Carrick Gow in Highgate Cemetery

== Paintings ==
- The Relief of Leyden (1876 - Private Collection)
- A War Dispatch at the Hotel de Ville (1878 - Walker Art Gallery(?), Liverpool)
- "No Surrender" (French soldiers in loft after Ligny) (1879 - National Gallery of Victoria, Melbourne)
- Montrose at Kilsyth (1881 - Old Town Hall, Bedford)
- A Jacobite Proclamation (1882 - Art Gallery of New South Wales, Sydney)
- Trophies of Victory (Soldiers of the Dutch States General examining trophies captured at Battle of Nieuwpoort) (1883)
- Cromwell at Dunbar (1886 - Tate)
- The Garrison Marching Out with the Honours of War: Lille, A.D. 1708 (1887)
- A Lost Cause: Flight of James II after the Battle of the Boyne (1888 - Tate)
- Requisitioned (French cavalry stopped at by grain mill)
- A Search Party (French cuirassiers outside church, c. 1810) (1889 - Private Collection)
- The Visit of King Charles I to Kingston upon Hull, 1642 (1889)
- After Waterloo (Retreating French soldiers followed by Napoleon on horseback) (1890)
- The Duke in Spain (Wellington and staff during the Peninsular campaign)(1893)
- God Save James II (1894)
- On the Sands of Boulogne, 1805 (Napoleon and his staff) (1895 - Oldham Art Gallery)
- A Mountain Pass (French reconnoitering party in Spain) (1895 - Royal Academy of Art)
- The Emperor (Napoleon on his white charger) (1896)
- Waiting for Prince Charlie (Group of horsemen on sands) (1897)
- On the Way to Exile: The Arrival of the Emperor at Rochefort, 1815 (1897)
- The Signal (Horsemen on a beach) (1898)
- Queen Victoria at St. Paul's Cathedral on Diamond Jubilee Day (Guildhall Art Gallery)
- The death of the Khalifa
- Washington's Farewell to the Army (1902)
- Farewell to Nelson (1904 - National Maritime Museum)
- Royalist Prisoners (1913 - Parliamentarian soldier with Royalist woman and child)
- Nelson Leaving Portsmouth, 18th May 1803 (1903 - Royal Exchange, London)

== Gallery ==
News from the Front, 1878

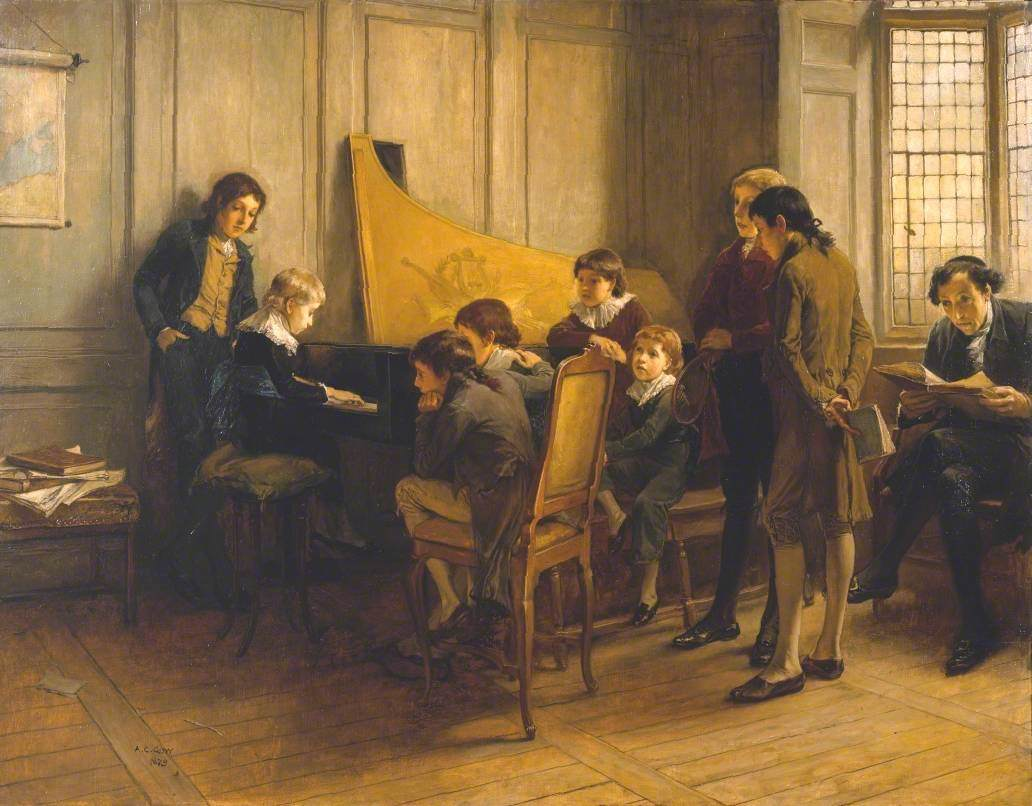
A Musical Story by Chopin, 1879

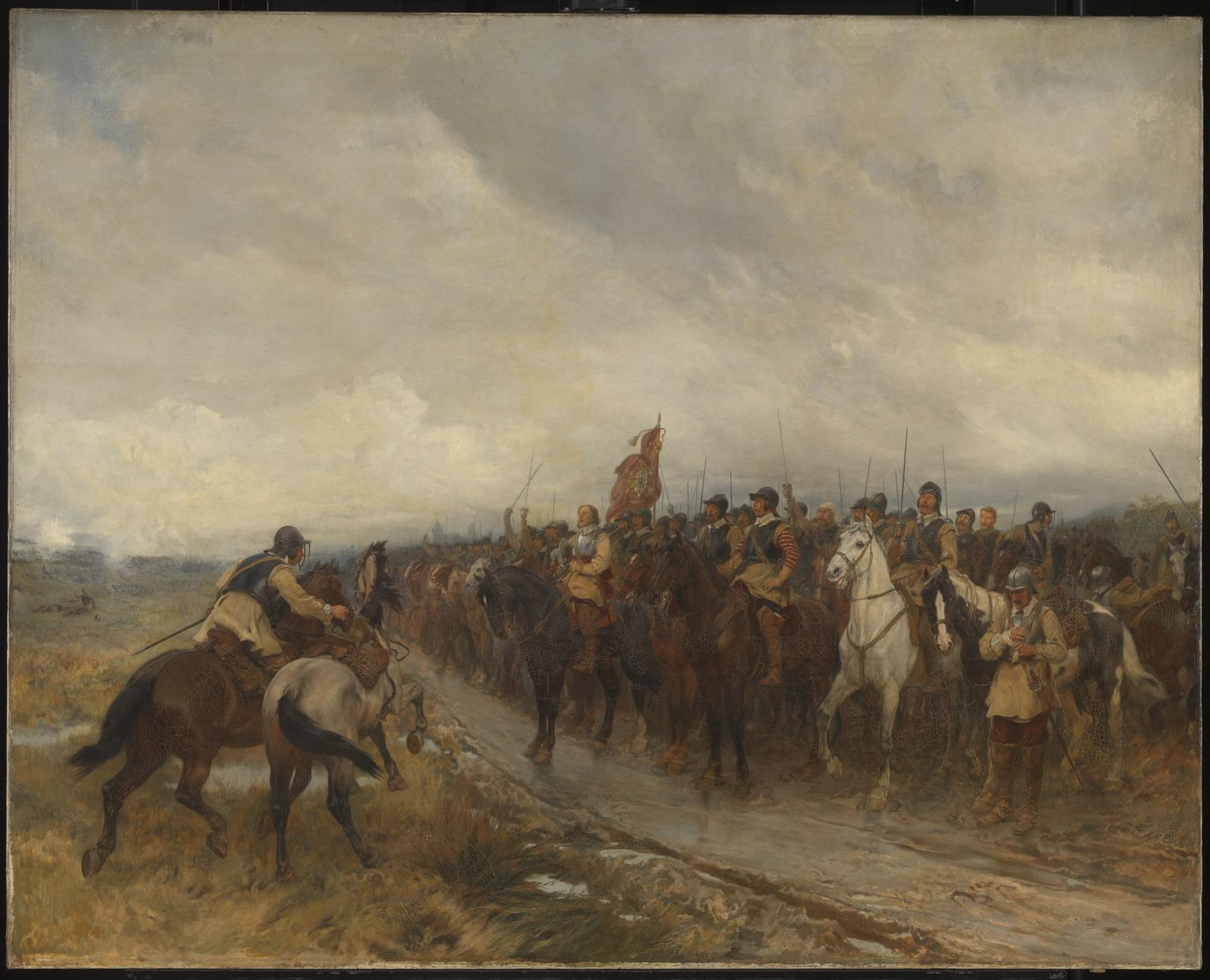
Cromwell at Dunbar, 1886

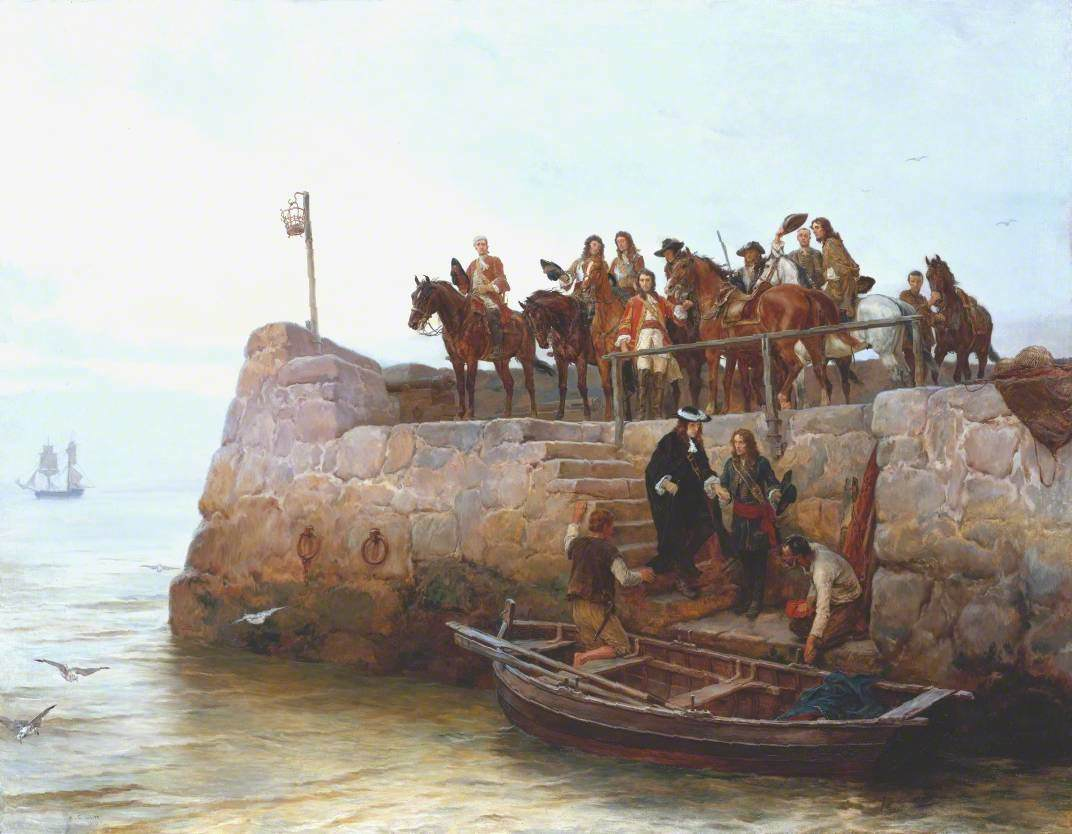
A Lost Cause, 1888

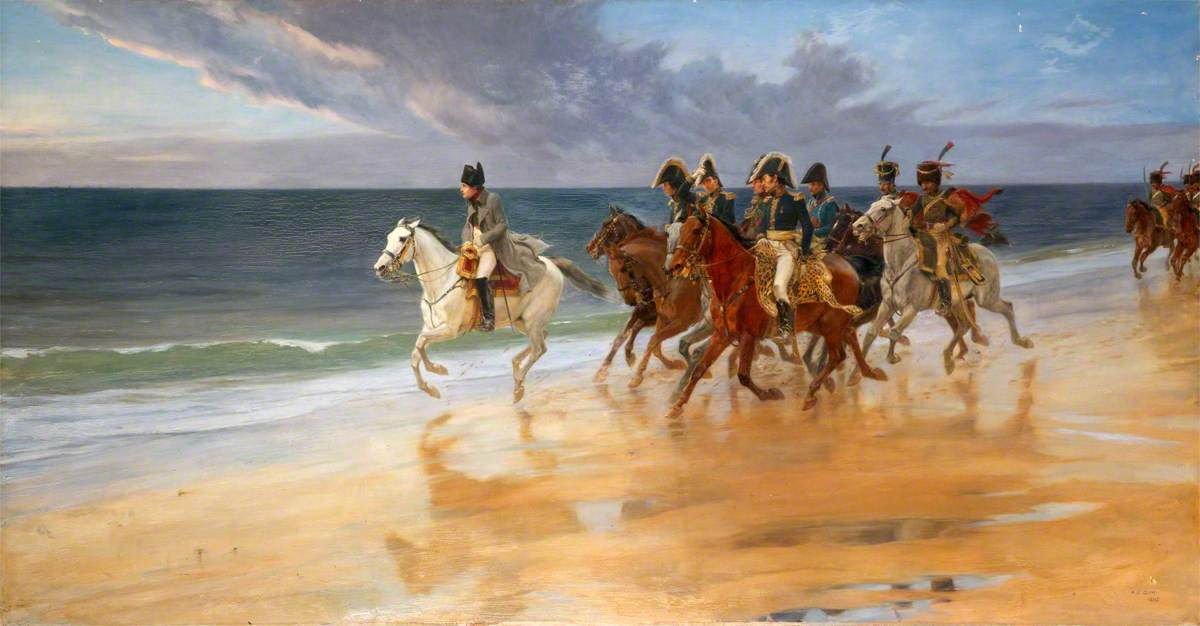
Napoleon on the Sands at Boulogne, 1895

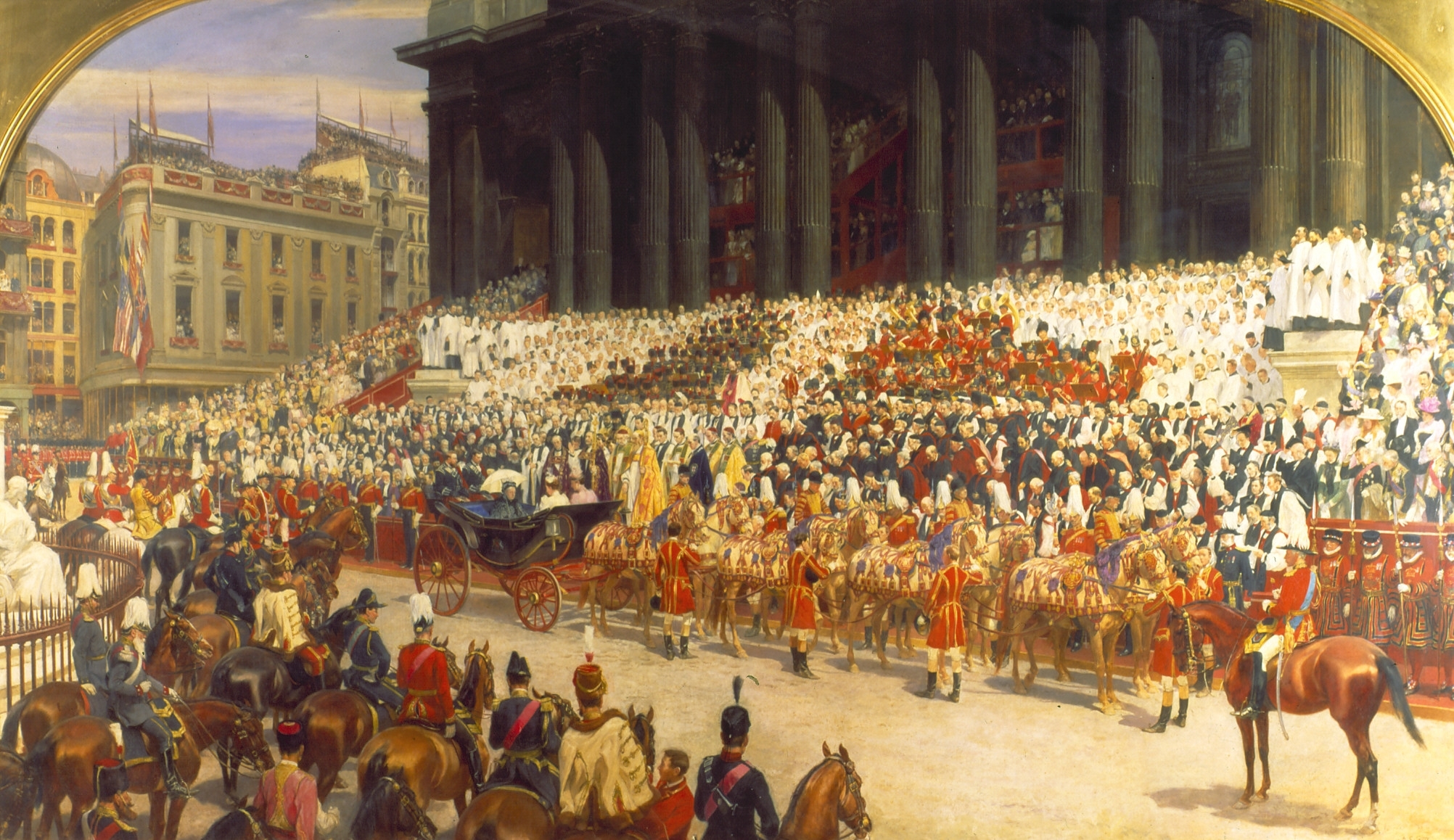
Queen Victoria's Diamond Jubilee Service, 1899

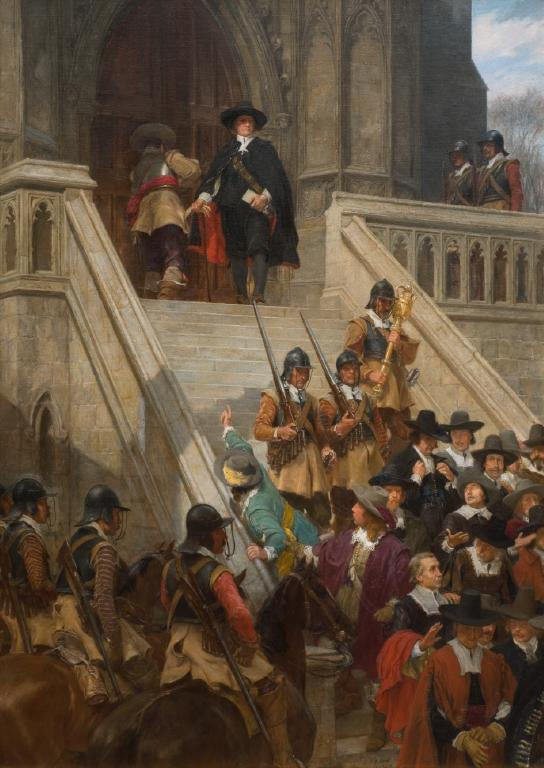
Cromwell dissolving the Long Parliament, 1907
