= A Lost Cause =

Painting by Andrew Carrick Gow

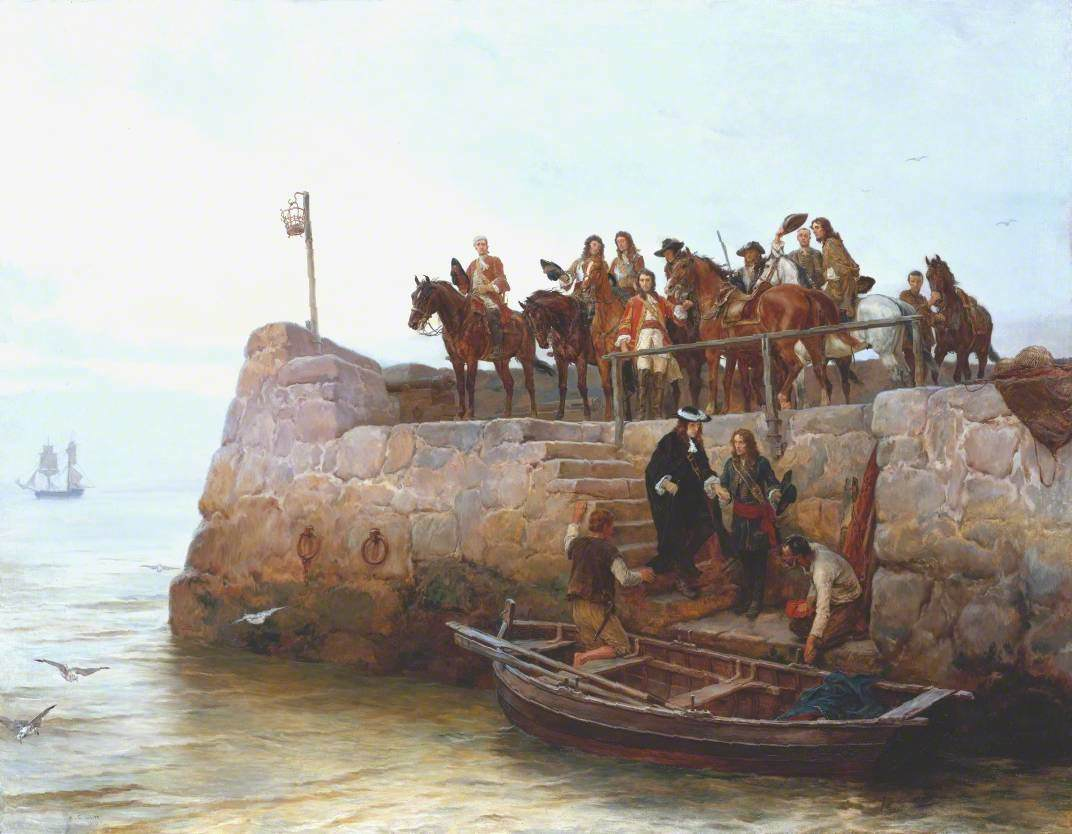
- Artist: Andrew Carrick Gow
- Year: 1888
- Type: Oil on canvas, history painting
- Dimensions: 118.1 cm × 151.1 cm (46.5 in × 59.5 in)
- Location: Tate Britain, London

A Lost Cause: Flight of King James II after the Battle of the Boyne is an 1888 history painting by the English artist Andrew Carrick Gow. It depicts a scene from 1690 during the Williamite War in Ireland when James II sailed for France from the port of Kinsale following his Irish Army's defeat at the Battle of the Boyne in 1690. After his departure his Jacobite supporters continued to fight on – notably at the Battle of Aughrim – before surrendering at Limerick in 1691.

It was displayed at the Royal Academy's Summer Exhibition of 1888. Today it is in the collection of the Tate Britain in London, having been acquired in 1894.

== See also ==
- Henry Mosler's painting depicting the Lost Cause of the American Confederacy.

== Bibliography ==
- Harrington, Peter. British Artists and War: The Face of Battle in Paintings and Prints, 1700-1914. Greenhill Books, 1993.
- Millar, Stephen. Lust, Lies and Monarchy: The Secrets Behind Britain's Royal Portraits. Museyonm 2020.
- Wright, Christopher, Gordon, Catherine May & Smith, Mary Peskett. British and Irish Paintings in Public Collections: An Index of British and Irish Oil Paintings by Artists Born Before 1870 in Public and Institutional Collections in the United Kingdom and Ireland.
