= John Graham (clergyman) =

Irish clergyman (1774–1844)

John Graham (1774–1844) was a Church of Ireland clergyman, a senior officer of the Orange Order, and a prolific author of poetic and historical works. He opposed Catholic Emancipation and was for more than two decades a prominent champion of the Protestant cause in Ireland.

== Early life and Church appointments ==
He was the eldest son of James and Anne (née Hart) Graham of Clones, County Monaghan, born in the parish of Shruel, County Longford, on 21 April 1774. (Note: His year of birth has often been stated as 1776, but at his death in 1843 he was "in his 70th year" according to both his tombstone inscription and contemporary newspaper reports (e.g. Northern Standard, 16 March 1843) which therefore support the birthdate contained in the Londonderry Standard’s obituary tribute to him. Of his great-grandparents, James Graham of Mullinahinch had served as a cornet of dragoons in the defence of Enniskillen and John Cross of Dartan, County Armagh, had been among the defenders of Derry, 1689: Londonderry Sentinel, 28 January 1832; Robert Young, Notes to Defence of Enniskillen, an Historical Song, Londonderry, 1832.) Educated at Trinity College, Dublin, he joined both the College’s corps of yeomanry and the recently formed Orange Institution, graduating in July 1798, the year of the United Irishmen’s uprising. In August he set out from Dublin to be ordained at Killala but, finding that district occupied by French insurgents, he joined a troop of dragoons and remained in active service until on 9 September he "saw by the light of the rising sun on the ensanguined field of Ballynamuck the dead bodies of seven hundred Irish rebels and the entire of their French allies prisoner". Returning to Dublin, he was ordained a priest of the Church of Ireland on 24 February 1799.

He held successive curacies in Kilrush, County Clare, and the Ulster parishes of Maghera, Tamlaght O’Crilly and Lifford, until in 1824 he was appointed Rector of Tamlaghtard, otherwise Magilligan, where he remained until his death twenty years later. While at Lifford he was inspector of the local gaol and kept a school where his pupils included James MacCullagh, future Fellow of the Royal Society and recipient of its Copley Medal. Visiting Graham in 1822, Dr Thomas Reid found he had charge of Lifford’s lunatic asylum (Note: According to Reid, Graham had introduced to the asylum a system of treatment that had restored to sanity more inmates there than in any comparable establishment in Ireland: "his system is comprised in two words kindness and patience".) and was "fraught with information on almost every topic ... and distinguished for learning and talents of the first order". Reid recorded his surprise that, after twenty-three years as a curate, this "excellent individual" had yet to be rewarded with his own parish. Five years earlier Earl Whitworth, the Lord Lieutenant, had regretted the lack of opportunity to give Graham the preferment he desired.

Graham considered the faith of the Church of Ireland was "in sum and substance" the same as that practised in Ireland from the sixth century until Roman Catholicism arrived from England in the twelfth. As a boy of fourteen he had witnessed the centenary celebrations of the Apprentice Boys’ closure of the gates of Londonderry against the army of the Catholic James II, a key moment in the conflict which brought eventual victory to William of Orange. Graham believed the proper legacy of the Orange victory should be the expulsion of Popery from Ireland and comprehensive restoration of the faith established there a millennium earlier. Supremacy for Protestantism and respect for the Orange achievement were the mainsprings of his life’s work.

== Early literary work ==
His early writing concerned social, economic and topographical matters and was first published in 1808 as part of Hely Dutton’s Statistical Survey of the County of Clare. Dutton’s preface included the observation that the Survey would have been a superior publication if uniform in quality with John Graham’s contributions.

Commencing in 1813, he produced detailed accounts of the parishes of Maghera (Note: Included in Graham’s account of Maghera is his correspondence with Dr Samuel Labatt concerning how his eldest son had been inoculated with cow-pox infection when aged 11 months but, despite the infection having "taken", contracted small-pox at age 9: William Shaw Mason, A Statistical Account or Parochial Survey of Ireland, drawn up from the Communications of the Clergy, Vol. I (1814), pp. 614-616. Labatt wrote and lectured extensively on cow-pox and vaccination.) and Shruel (Note: He described himself as "a native of this parish": Mason’s A Statistical Account or Parochial Survey of Ireland, Vol. III (1819), p. 333. His account of the parish included information about the early life of Oliver Goldsmith, whom Graham greatly admired. In 1820 he was instrumental in convening an assembly of fellow Goldsmith enthusiasts at which it was proposed that such gathering should become an annual event and that a monumental pillar for Goldsmith should be erected at Lissoy (nothing came of either proposal): Saunders’s News-Letter, 22 December 1820. At this time Graham was in correspondence with Sir Walter Scott, who in 1816 had reproached the Irish for neglecting Goldsmith’s memory. He had also come to know Maria Edgeworth, who lived at Edgeworthtown, adjacent to Lissoy. Graham’s surviving letters to Scott cover the period 1817-28 and are held by the National Library of Scotland (MSS 3888-3907). Scott is said to have admired his ballads: Norman Moore, Dictionary of National Biography, 1885-1900, Vol. XXII, p. 351.) and of the Kilrush Union for William Shaw Mason’s three-volume Statistical Survey of Ireland, and in 1823-25 he contributed the chronological section of the Statistical Account of the City and County of Londonderry and the Counties of Tyrone and Donegal published in the North West of Ireland Society’s Magazine. (Note: In 1833 he provided a corrected copy of Rev. Samuel Butler’s Statistical Report of Magilligan, prepared for the North West Society, to George Petrie, and also supplied "in a most distinctive style" other detailed information for the Ordnance Survey’s collection of material concerning the parish: Ordnance Survey Memoirs of Ireland, Volume 11, Parishes of County Londonderry III, 1831-5, Institute of Irish Studies, Queen’s University of Belfast, 1991, pp. xi and 118.) For this latter work he was made an Honorary Member of the Society and presented with a gift of silver plate.

From 1816 onward he wrote a series of articles entitled "Annals of Irish Popery by John De Falkirk", (Note: The pen-name alludes to the 13th century John de Graham, noted for his valour at the Battle of Falkirk.) tracing Ireland’s ecclesiastical, civil and military history from 1535 to 1691. These appeared in the Dublin Journal and were subsequently published in collected form to counter what Graham described as Denis Taaffe’s "false and traitorous History of Ireland" of which a compendium had been circulated "when the true reformed faith of this realm was assailed by the Popish demagogues of Ireland".

During the same period he composed numerous poems and ballads, examples of which regularly appeared (generally anonymously though often credited as originating in Lifford) in the Anti-Jacobin Review and sometimes reached a wider audience in the columns of newspapers and journals such as the Morning Post, The Sun, and the Gentleman's Magazine. (Note: See, for instance, his lines on George IV’s visit, "The King's Welcome to Ireland", in the Morning Post, 28 August 1821; "An Ode on the Relief of Londonderry", in The Sun, 30 August 1823; "On the death of the Countess of Talbot", "On the death of George III" and extracts from "God’s Revenge against Rebellion, A Historical Poem on the State of Ireland" in the Gentleman's Magazine, Vol. XC, 1820. The full text of "God’s Revenge" appeared in book form, privately printed for Graham in Dublin in 1820.)

Increasingly his work contained material hostile to "the Romish persuasion" and Catholic emancipation. Sometimes this was expressed in verse (Note: An example is "An Irish Melody, Occasioned by the Belfast Protestant Petition for Unqualified Emancipation", printed in the Anti-Jacobin Review, No. 55 (1818-19), p. 602.) but it also appeared in argumentative tracts such as his 1820 Defence of the Orange Society in Ireland and in articles written for The Warder under the pseudonym "An Apprentice Boy".

These works were praised by Sir Harcourt Lees, who lamented that his own writing in protest at Jesuit political activity in Ireland was "unsupported except by the Rev. John Graham, the learned but humble Curate of Lifford". In 1823, at the request of the Editor of the Dublin Evening Herald, Graham wrote "Sir Harcourt’s Vision, An Historical Poem", containing a fictional account of Lees returning to his grotto at Howth and having a vision of various post-1641 historical scenes. Graham subsequently had this printed in 14-page booklet form.

Conversely, Graham’s writing attracted the vitriol of the poet Thomas Furlong, an advocate of Catholic Emancipation who dubbed him "crazy Graham", dismissed his poetry as "vile doggerel" and "ribald rhymes", and enjoined his readers to "mark how he stoops laboriously to drain the last low oozings of his muddy brain".

== Derriana ==
In 1823 he published Derriana, being an account of the siege of Londonderry and defence of Enniskillen in 1688-89. Sometimes referred to as the New Derriana it succeeded another Derriana, compiled by George Douglas in 1794, which had reproduced early accounts of the siege and related matters. Graham wove these accounts into a single diary of the events of 1688-89 incorporating dialogue excerpts from an "old historical dramatisation" of such events (traditionally ascribed to Colonel John Mitchelburne) and adding his own lyrical catalogue of significant figures in the siege (based on an ancient poem discovered at Armagh) with accompanying biographical notes on the individuals named.

== Imprisonment ==
By the time of his appointment to Magilligan, Graham was widely known as a senior member of the Orange Order, and he was soon called "Orange Graham" or "the Orange Rector" by locals hostile to his sympathies. Over a period of months prior to February 1826 his family and servants were repeatedly disturbed late at night by sounds of fife music and of footsteps passing and re-passing his glebe-house. Graham and his sons eventually confronted a party of men engaged in the disturbance, Graham snatching the fife from its player and pistol-whipping three of the party. He was accused and convicted of assault, for which he was sentenced to one month’s imprisonment and bound over to keep the peace for three years.

While he was imprisoned, an "immense number" of intruders entered upon his glebe and pitched tents there for the purposes of holding a so-called "ribbon fair" (an event supposedly organised by Ribbonmen). The police were summoned and, after a long stand-off, were attacked. Four of the attackers, including the owner of the fife seized by Graham, were subsequently sentenced to a year’s imprisonment. One report of the matter implied that local hostility towards Graham followed his exposure of the "kissing priest", a Catholic clergyman in Magilligan accused of attempting to seduce the wife of a parishioner while she knelt in confession before him. (Note: It appears from the title page of Robert Young’s The Orange Minstrel (1832), on which is reproduced a stanza from "Graham’s Poem on Father O’Flaherty, London, 1826", that Graham wrote verses on this celebrated affair. "The Reverend Confessor O’Flaherty and his Fair Penitent", which appeared anonymously in the Dublin Evening Mail of 10 February 1826, also looks likely to have been his work.)

== Orange Order and political activities ==
He was Chaplain (sometimes styled Senior Grand Chaplain) of the Orange Institution by January 1820 and was reappointed as such, reportedly "for the nineteenth time", in 1838. (Note: The Institution was, as a political society, suppressed in 1825 (with the result that Graham was described as its "late Chaplain" in April of that year) and not revived until 1828. It was banned again in 1836, but in 1838 Graham wrote from Dublin appealing to Orangemen in Ulster to attend its next annual meeting and reporting that its Committee "meets daily": Northern Whig, 10 November 1838. He may therefore have been Chaplain before 1820 if re-elected for the nineteenth time in 1838, when he was "understood to be the senior member of the order": The Warder, 17 November 1838.) In 1825 he was elected Grand Master of the Grand Orange Lodge of the City and County of Londonderry and was still such in 1842, the position giving him considerable influence over district lodges in the county, which in 1831 numbered 120 with an approximate total membership of 17,000. (Note: According to the Londonderry Sentinel of 5 March 1831, he had, as County Master, "entire control" over the district lodges.) In 1829 he presided when the Orangemen of Tyrone, Donegal and Londonderry met together, and in 1832 he was said to be "now the Father of the Orangemen of Ireland". Following dissolution of the Grand Lodge of Ireland in 1844 he was elected first Master of the Grand Lodge of Ulster, but died within a month of his election.

In 1830 the Londonderry Sentinel reported "general belief" that Graham had identified himself with Orangeism as a means to preferment within his church and had expected nothing less than a bishopric if the Duke of York, Grand Master of the Order, became king. (Note: Representation of Graham as a careful schemer sits ill with the Sentinel’s earlier description of him as "a man of fewer calculations than impulses": Londonderry Sentinel, 28 November 1829. The 1830 report followed a spat between Graham and the Sentinel’s editor, William Wallen, and until the latter’s death in 1842 the newspaper’s accounts of Graham’s conduct often had a hostile edge. Representation of the Protestant cause in Derry became increasingly factional after 1829 and the No Surrender Club declared its support for Wallen by advertising that Graham had "no connection whatever" with the Apprentice Boys association: Londonderry Sentinel, 30 October 1830. In 1832 the Sentinel’s report of Graham’s language at an Orange meeting was considered by him so false that he took space in the Belfast Guardian to correct the record: Northern Whig, 22 November 1832.) If such had ever been Graham’s design, by 1830 his Orange connection spoke more plausibly of his "willingness to renounce high prospects". At his death his association with the Order was said to have been "distinguished for his uncompromising principles and for the wholesome spirit of religious confidence which he infused into Its councils", and he was remembered for "increasing the use of his influence with the Orangemen to preserve them from infringing in the least the laws" by which their activities had become circumscribed. (Note: In 1825 he published an address urging obedience to the law suppressing the Institution, and in 1828 he urged caution concerning attempts to revive it: Saunders’s News-Letter, 6 April 1825; National Archives of Ireland, CSO/RP/1838/364. After its revival he regularly issued instructions against holding prohibited processions, and he also introduced regulatory disciplines such as prohibition of alcohol consumption on Orange Lodge premises: Londonderry Sentinel, 10 August 1839.)

It was Graham’s representation of the general Protestant rather than the particular Orange interest that brought him the civic recognition evident when his health and work were regularly toasted at anniversary celebrations of the Shutting of the Gates of Derry. In 1827 the toast was proposed by Sir George Hill, Member of Parliament (MP) for the city, who declared that Graham had "for a series of years back, been reckless of selfish considerations, devoted his time and his talents to the maintenance of the Protestant interest, and possessed a strong claim on the gratitude of the citizens of Londonderry". (Note: He was made a freeman of Derry: Londonderry Sentinel, 16 July 1831.) Hill had just proposed the health of George Robert Dawson, MP for County Londonderry, who like Hill had promised implacable opposition to Catholic emancipation and had benefited from Graham’s energetic support at elections. But in the following year Dawson turned coat and helped pave the way for passing of the Roman Catholic Relief Act 1829, which Graham regarded as the moment "the sun of England’s glory went down". (Note: He regarded the passing of the Act as treachery on the part of England, which he considered obliged to protect the Church of Ireland in gratitude for St Columba’s disciples' restoration of Christianity to Northumbria in the sixth century: Dublin Evening Packet and Correspondent, 19 August 1834.)

Graham met Dawson’s apostasy with venom. He perambulated Derry’s streets in a dogcart with a dead rodent labelled "Rat Dawson" suspended from it and commenced a vigorous campaign to prevent Dawson’s re-election. Recognising the hopelessness of his position, Dawson resigned the Londonderry seat in July 1830 and looked elsewhere for a constituency. Graham’s exertions won him the admiration of Dublin’s Common Councilmen who voted him the freedom of their city — which was withheld on the intervention of its Board of Aldermen (the Commons retaliating by blocking the Aldermanic nomination of Archdeacon Thomas Singleton). (Note: Graham enjoyed some celebrity in Dublin. When, in 1837, he travelled 120 miles to cast his vote against Joseph Stock (whom he denounced as "an instrument in the hands of the Jesuits behind the curtain in the Castle of Dublin") in the Dublin University parliamentary election, attempts were made to chair him into Trinity College hall; these he resisted on the ground that only the successful candidate deserved such honour: Dublin Evening Packet and Correspondent, 5 August 1837; Londonderry Standard, 9 August 1837.)

When the poll for the County Londonderry Election opened in August 1830, a procession of 400 mounted freeholders entered Derry to cast their votes, Graham riding at their head "on a white charger and bearing a wand". An element of theatre seems to have attended his later political appearances. In February 1831, "with William the Third set in gold suspended from his neck by an Orange collar", he took control of a public meeting in Coleraine, pulling a respected local figure from his platform and knocking off the man’s hat. He then mounted the platform where he allegedly "danced, pranced, made signs and grimaces". Acquitted on a charge of assault resulting from this affair, he was shortly afterwards reported as behaving, at an election meeting in the Court House in Derry, in a manner "indescribably ludicrous and pantomimical" and "affording a triumph to the impugners of Protestantism by his wretched buffoonery". (Note: These descriptions seem peculiar to the Londonderry Sentinel, and should perhaps be received with caution: see note 13.)

== Later publications ==
During the 1820s, Graham was a prolific author of verse. This was composed, he said, "in the leisure hours of a life actively engaged in the defence of the Protestant religion and constitution of the realm", and his conduct of politics through poetry found space in both metropolitan and provincial English newspapers in compositions such as "Roman Catholic emancipation: a warning voice to the people of England". In 1829 a 368-page collection of his poetry was published as Poems, Chiefly Historical, dedicated to Lord Kenyon, Deputy Grand Master of the Orange Society, and containing "specimens of almost every kind of English Versification - the Italian stanza of Spenser, the Heroic Lines of Goldsmith, the Hudibrastics of Butler, and the Peter Pindarics of Lord Byron, with a great variety of Lyric measure, adapted to the music of popular Sonnets".

In 1829 there also appeared his A History of the Siege of Derry and Defence of Enniskillen, in the year 1688 and 1689, being a second edition of Derriana, (Note: 2,000 copies of the first and second editions were printed in Derry and Dublin and the book was again out of print in 1834: Londonderry Sentinel, 19 July 1834.) and he advertised for subscription a proposed history of the City of Londonderry and North-West District of Ireland covering the period 1689-1829. The proposed book did not materialise but some of its intended content reached print in the series of articles "Desiderata Curiosa Derriana", which he wrote (under the pseudonym "Statisticus") for the Londonderry Sentinel and Londonderry Standard in 1840-43.

1839 saw the publication of his A History of Ireland: From The Relief of Londonderry in 1689 to the Surrender of Limerick in 1691. He intended that this should form part of a four-volume History of Ireland, the remaining three volumes to consist of new editions of Annals and Derriana and other material he had "in readiness". Two years later came Ireland Preserved, in which he reworked Mitchelburne’s "old historical drama" (from which he had borrowed in 1823) and Robert Ashton’s Battle of Aughrim, revised the lyrical catalogue from Derriana, and expanded the related biographical notes.

== Parish and domestic matters ==
Although Graham’s annual income at Magilligan was £300 or more, he lived modestly: "he never furnished his glebe-house except with the worthless furniture which he had when a curate and his personal habits were always the most simple and frugal". But he was "hospitable beyond his means", gave generously for widows and orphans, travelled frequently, and personally bore the costs of initiatives such as his relentless prosecution of Father Boyle, the Catholic priest in Magilligan, for officiating at the marriage of a Catholic and a Protestant who, contrary to an act of Parliament of 1725, had not previously been married by the Church of Ireland. In consequence, at his death he was said to leave no more to his family than "the great principles of the Protestant religion".

In 1842, when a letter appeared in the press suggesting he neglected his parish, the Bishop of Derry was promptly presented with an address signed by 134 members of Graham’s Church of Ireland congregation attesting to his reliability as a minister in every respect and to his care for the poor of all denominations. This was accompanied by a letter signed by 100 Roman Catholics from within the parish, praising his courtesy and kindness and saying there had been no clergyman of any persuasion more constantly present among them. (Note: In 1831 the total population of the parish was 3,608, of whom 560 were members of the Church of Ireland, 668 were Presbyterians, and 2,380 were Catholics. In 1824 the total had been reckoned as 3,047 and the number of Protestant (including Presbyterian) households was counted as 233. A combination of these figures suggests a total of around 130 Church of Ireland families in 1831, perhaps indicative of Graham having the support of the great majority of his flock in 1842 (when the communicants would have been competing for seating accommodation limited to 100 in the parish church): Ordnance Survey Memoirs, pp. 85, 93, 95, 96 and 107.)

His relationship with the Presbyterian community seems to have passed unrecorded, beyond it being said that he displayed "a growing zeal for unity and harmony amongst the Protestants of Ireland". (Note: He was said to be on terms of friendship with Henry Cooke, the Irish Presbyterian leader, to whom, in a letter of 1840, he expressed himself "most desirous of a union among Protestants of all sects": Dublin Evening Packet, 30 April 1840.)

== Death, memorial and family ==
Graham died at Magilligan on 9 March 1844 and was buried in the churchyard there. In 1856, twelve years having elapsed without a stone being placed over his grave, an appeal was made for funds to erect a suitable memorial to him. The conduct of the appeal and implementation of its objective were slow, and in 1861 Graham’s tomb was still incomplete. In response to criticism, the trustees of the project passed to Magilligan’s new rector a sum regarded as sufficient for completion, retaining the surplus to put up a proposed tablet to Graham’s memory in St Columb's Cathedral. A further appeal for funds was made in the latter connection and raised some sixty or seventy pounds. (Note: Much of this money came from Canada where Graham’s work had a popular following among Immigrants from Ulster. Graham Loyal Orange Lodge, no. 20, at Fredericton, New Brunswick, was named after him in 1844: Londonderry Sentinel, 5 January 1907.) However, in 1863 the tomb remained unfinished, its foundation had given way, and no tablet for Graham had been erected in the Cathedral. In the 1870s, the funds in hand were applied to the cost of various installations in the Apprentice Boys’ Memorial Hall in Derry, including a mural tablet for Graham in the upper assembly room.

Graham had married Elizabeth Johnson of Carrigaholt, County Clare, in 1802. Robert Young’s "Song, on hearing Mrs Elizabeth Graham play the piano surrounded by her family" was printed in The Orange Minstrel of 1832. She died on 7 March 1845. The couple had numerous children, the youngest being born in 1832, thirty years after their marriage.

Their eldest son, Rev. James Graham (1804–45), was appointed his father’s curate at Magilligan in 1827 and was a Deputy Grand Chaplain of the Orange Order. He was later Clerical Secretary of the non-denominational Society for Promoting the Education of the Poor in Ireland (otherwise known as the Kildare Park Society) before becoming Senior Curate of St Columb's Cathedral, Londonderry. He was the father of the noted Victorian journalist Charlotte Eliza Humphry.

John Graham’s younger sons included Rev. Richard Graham (1807–76) who died while a chaplain at Chaguanas, Trinidad, where he was noted for his eccentricity and charitable acts, and William Graham (1811–58) who was admitted a Member of the Royal College of Surgeons in 1833. The latter was ship’s doctor on board the Hannah when she struck ice in the Gulf of Saint Lawrence in 1849; he broke an ankle attempting to prevent the ship’s captain leaving the stricken vessel and suffered serious frostbite before being rescued. Contrary to some reports, he recovered and returned to Ireland, where he became "a sottish drunkard" and led "a precarious vagrant existence" until his death in Londonderry Lunatic Asylum.

== Legacy ==
Graham’s accounts of the Williamite War in Ireland are of enduring importance, because he researched the subject at a time when there existed written records and oral traditions that have since been lost. As early as 1829, an Irish commentator observed that he had "rescued from oblivion important facts of our general and local history, long buried among nearly forgotten records of our country and which but for his indefatigable research must have been lost to posterity". And in 1861 it was doubted that the Siege of Derry "would ever have supplied the magnificent episode devoted to the subject in Macaulay’s History had the labours of the humble Rector of Tamlaghtard not gone before to facilitate the researches and kindle the enthusiasm of the noble historian".

In Graham’s lifetime he was recognised as "the Poet Laureate of the Northern Orangemen", The popularity of his anthems in the mid-19th century is recorded, for instance, in the Preface to William Shannon’s The United Empire Minstrel, while David O'Donoghue later called him "the best of the Orange poets". His Orange sympathies and the sectarian character of many of his ballads resulted in his skill with rhyme and rhythm being rejected by many of his contemporaries and overlooked by subsequent generations.

In 1861 the Londonderry Sentinel opined that his works would "hereafter hold a place incomparably beyond any accorded to them during his lifetime", and when, in 1892, his Poems, Chiefly Historical, were republished under the title Loyal Lays of Ancient Derry, they were promoted with the recommendation that "In years to come when ancient forms of party strife have died out they will take their place in Irish literature beside the National Ballads". Perhaps such predictions still await their ultimate fulfilment.
