= Apprentice Boys Memorial Hall =

Apprentice Boys Memorial Hall and Siege Museum
- The Apprentice Boys Memorial Hall, the Siege Museum extension is visible on the far right

- Location within Northern Ireland
- Alternative names: Memorial Hall

General information
- Architectural style: Scots baronial / Gothic Revival
- Location: 13 Society Street, Derry, Northern Ireland
- Coordinates: 54°59′44″N 7°19′24″W
- Current tenants: Apprentice Boys of Derry, Siege Museum, Loyal Orders
- Construction started: 1873
- Completed: 1877
- Client: Apprentice Boys of Derry
- Owner: Associated Clubs of the Apprentice Boys of Derry

Design and construction
- Architects: John Guy Ferguson, Extension: Robinson & Davidson
- Designations: Grade B1 listed building

The Apprentice Boys of Derry Memorial Hall and Siege Museum, also known as the Apprentice Boys' Memorial Hall, or simply the Memorial Hall, is a Grade B1 listed building located within the city walls of Derry, Northern Ireland. Built originally in 1877, it is located on Society Street.

The Memorial Hall serves as the headquarters of the Apprentice Boys of Derry, a Protestant fraternal organisation established to commemorate the Siege of Derry of 1688–1689.

In 2016, the Memorial Hall opened the Siege Museum, which covers the history of the 1689 siege. Artefacts on display date back to the 17th century at the time of the siege. The remains of the ancient gates of the city are stored in the cellars of the hall.

== Uses ==
All members join one of the eight parent clubs of the Apprentice Boys and are initiated in the Memorial Hall. This occurs during the Relief of Derry, also known as "Derry Day" during the Maiden City Festival in August, as well as the Shutting of the Gates, also known as "Lundy's Day" in December. Actors get prepared and changed in the hall. It serves as a meeting point for the Apprentice Boys General Committee and officers prior to the parades taking place, and as a stop point for ceremonial wreath-laying.

An effigy of Governor Robert Lundy is prepared in the hall annually. Lundy, known as "Lundy the traitor", is traditionally hanged and burned in effigy during the Shutting of the Gates procession.

The hall is also used by Orange Order lodges and preceptories of the Royal Black Institution. In particular, the City of Londonderry Grand Orange Lodge use the hall.

Orange Victims Day remembrance services and exhibitions take place in the Memorial Hall annually on 1 September.

Apprentice Boys Memorial Hall is a venue during Orange Heritage Week, in which lectures and workshops are held.

Loyalist marching bands use the Memorial Hall for weekly rehearsals, including Churchill Flute Band and William King Memorial Flute Band.

== Siege Museum ==
In 2013, the Apprentice Boys of Derry were awarded a grant of £2.2 million from the European Union's PEACE III Programme to build a museum. The museum occupies the site of the Hall's 1937 extension. Additional funding for the redevelopment was provided by the Northern Ireland Tourist Board and the Northern Ireland Environmental Agency. The project had a total cost of £3.7 million.

In April 2016, the Siege Museum and Exhibition, also known as the Apprentice Boys Museum, officially opened to the public.

== History ==
=== 19th century ===
The concept of erecting a memorial hall was talked about in the 1860s.

==== Construction ====
The Apprentice Boys Memorial Hall was constructed in two main phases, with the original section built between 1873 and 1877 and an extension added from 1935 to 1937. It was designed by architect John Guy Ferguson in a Scottish baronial style.

In 1877, following the opening of the Apprentice Boys Memorial Hall, a procession took place featuring 25 marching bands and displays of flags and banners. Rioting took place that resulted in the military being called in to diffuse the situation.

=== 20th century ===
==== Extension ====
The building was extended further along Society Street, designed by Robinson & Davidson. The extension opened in 1937. It honours those who died in World War I.

In 1989, during The Troubles, the Irish Republican Army detonated a bomb in a bar on Butcher Street shortly before a Apprentice Boys parade. The impact shattered the glass windows of the Memorial Hall.

=== 21st century ===
In August 2013, Derry was announced as the inaugural UK City of Culture. For the occasion, the National Lottery Community Fund awarded the Apprentice Boys a grant of £90,000 to support the Memorial Hall and operate a temporary museum.

In 2016, the Siege Museum, opened to the public.

In February 2026, the Apprentice Boys announced plans to carry out new works for the Memorial Hall tp upgrade the siege museum and to add a viewing platform for views of Derry and Donegal.

In July 2026, a youth and children's flute band practising in the Memorial Hall were targeted in a sectarian attack. DUP and SDLP MLAs condemned the attacks.

== In popular culture ==
The Memorial Hall and Siege Museum is a stop on walking tours of the Walled City.

== Apprentice Boys Memorial Hall, Londonderry Act ==
The Apprentice Boys Memorial Hall, Londonderry Act (Northern Ireland) 1935 is a local and private Act of the Parliament of Northern Ireland to confer statutory powers upon the Trustees of the Apprentice Boys Memorial Hall in Derry.

== See also ==
- Grand Orange Lodge of Scotland
- Grand Orange Lodge of England
- Imperial Orange Council
- Royal Arch Purple
- Parades in Northern Ireland
- Banners in Northern Ireland
- Independent Loyal Orange Institution
