= John Cunningham (17th-century officer) =

Anglo-Irish soldier

John Cunningham was an Anglo-Irish soldier known for his command of an aborted attempt to relieve the city of Derry during the 1689 Siege. His failure led to his dismissal and replacement by William Stewart. Some sources refer to him as Thomas Cunningham, but the vast majority called him John.

Cunningham spent his much of his youth in Derry and visited several times as an adult. It is reported that at the time of the Siege he still had a brother living in the area who may have taken part in the city's defence.

As a Captain serving in the English Army during the reign of James II, Cunningham was a supporter of the Whig opposition. By May 1688 he wanted to resign his commission as he strongly opposed the King's religious reforms and did not want to be involved in what he saw as the destruction of the Church of England. Following the Glorious Revolution which ousted James, Cunningham received rapid promotion to Colonel and took command of a regiment which had previously been under Henry Cornwall.

In 1689 the regiment was one of two (the other was commanded by Solomon Richards) sent by ship from Liverpool to relieve the besieged city of Derry, one of the few Protestant strongholds still holding out against King James' Irish Jacobite forces. Cunningham was the senior officer on board, but his orders placed him under the command of the Governor Robert Lundy as soon as he went ashore. When the expedition anchored in Lough Foyle its arrival coincided with the Battle of Cladyford in which the Irish Army under Richard Hamilton had crossed the River Finn and routed the ill-organised Protestant forces. Lundy was panicked by the defeat at Cladyford, and was now convinced that Derry could not hold out. After at first ordering Cunningham and Richards ashore, he then countermanded this order suggesting that if they were disembarked both regiments would be lost when Derry had to surrender.

Cunningham and Richards returned to England with their regiments and carrying pessimistic reports despite anger amongst many of the Derry inhabitants that two disciplined regular battalions had been allowed to depart without firing a shot. As he had directly disobeyed orders to attempt to land at either Belfast Lough or Strangford Lough, should Derry not be possible, he was dismissed from his command and cashiered but received no further punishment. Solomon Richards was likewise deprived of his regiment. Cunningham's regiment passed under the command of Colonel William Stewart.

Robert Lundy resigned his post as Governor of Derry shortly afterwards, and left the city, but it successfully held out under the command of Henry Baker and John Mitchelburne. Amongst the forces commanded by General Percy Kirke which eventually arrived to assist the defenders was Cunningham's former regiment under Colonel Stewart. It has been suggested that had Derry fallen immediately, little blame would have been attached to Cunningham and Richards, but the successful resistance of the defenders raised questions about their negligent conduct.

== Bibliography ==
- Childs, John. The Army, James II and the Glorious Revolution. Manchester University Press, 1980.
- Childs, John. The British Army of William III, 1689-1702. Manchester University Press, 1987.
- Childs, John. The Williamite War in Ireland, 1688-1691. Continuum, 2007.
- Doherty, Richard. The Siege of Derry: The Military History. Spellmount, 2010.
