= Adam Murray (soldier) =

Irish Williamite soldier (died 1706)

- Military career
- Allegiance: Army of the North
- Conflicts: Williamite War in Ireland

Adam Murray (died 1706) was an Irish Ulster Scots soldier known for his service during the Williamite War in Ireland (1689–1691). He is particularly known for his participation at the 1689 Siege of Derry where he was one of the most active officers in defence of the city.

== Biography ==
Murray was a Protestant farmer from County Londonderry in Ulster. His family are thought to have come to Ulster from Philiphaugh, in the Scottish Borders. From her petition after his death for financial relief, we know that his wife was called Mary, and that they had four children; and his father, then over eighty years of age, was still alive in 1689.

There is no record of his having served in the Irish Army before 1688, but he may have been in the militia. When a rebellion broke out in 1689 amongst the Protestants of Ireland against the rule of the Catholic James II, Murray joined the forces of the Protestant Army of the North as a cavalry officer. He took part in the unsuccessful attempt to block the advancing Jacobite army of King James at the Battle of Cladyford. Murray's mounted troops were noted for their courage during the fight, only retiring when they had exhausted their ammunition.

After the battle Murray led a number of survivors to the closed gates of the city of Derry, by this point one of the few surviving Protestant positions. Murray's arrival was a crucial tipping point, coming at a time when a number of city leaders wished to agree to terms with King James. Murray's men strengthened the garrison, and led to the withdrawal of less resolute figures such as the Governor Robert Lundy and their replacement by more determined officers such as Henry Baker and John Mitchelburne. Many of the inhabitants and soldiers wanted Murray to be made Governor, but he declined and Baker and then Mitchelburne served in the position. Instead, Murray took command of the city's cavalry regiment.

Throughout the siege, Murray led a series of sorties against the besiegers, which boosted the morale of the city's defenders, However, in one such raid in July Murray was wounded in both thighs, and his cousin James Murray was killed. Despite heavy losses amongst the garrison and inhabitants, Derry was able to successfully hold out until its relief by General Percy Kirke in late July.

Murray’s name is found alongside Mitchelburne’s and Walker’s attached to an address from the "Governors, Officers, Clergy, and other Gentlemen, in the City and Garrison of Londonderry", dated 29 July 1689. His name appears as 'Adam Morrow', the names Murray and Morrow being, at that time, the same; 'Morrow' arising from the contemporary Scots pronunciation of 'Murray'.

Due to his severe wounds, he played little part in the rest of the war. His later military career was obscure, and he and his family were often in financial distress, as he evidently had no property other than his soldiers' pay. In 1700 he was briefly imprisoned for debt.

Murray's conduct during the siege made him a popular hero amongst Irish Protestants.

== Death ==
Murray died in February 1706, according to his widow's petition, and was buried at Old Glendermott alongside his former commander at Derry, John Mitchelburne. He left his family very badly provided for. In 1707 his widow Mary, on her own petition, was granted a pension of seven shillings a year.

== Notes and references ==
- Childs, John (2007), The Williamite Wars in Ireland 1688 - 1691, London: Hambledon Continuum Press, ISBN 978-1-85285-573-4
- Doherty, Richard (2008), The Siege of Derry 1689 - The Military History, Chalford: Spellmount, ISBN 978-0-7524-5536-5
