= Governor of Londonderry =

British military appointment

The Governor of Londonderry and Culmore was a British military appointment. The Governor was the officer who commanded the garrison and fortifications of the city of Derry and of Culmore fort. The Governor was paid by The Honourable The Irish Society.

== Governors of Londonderry and Culmore ==
- 1603–1606: The 1st Baron Docwra of Culmore
- 1606–1608: Sir George Paulet
- 1611–1643: Sir John Vaughan
- 1643–1644: Sir Robert Stewart
- 1644–1645: Colonel Audley Mervyn
- 1645–1648: Thomas Folliott, 2nd Baron Folliott
- 1648–1649: The 2nd Earl of Mountrath
- 1649–?: Robert Venables (left Ireland 1654)
- 1660–1661: Sir Robert Stewart (d. c.1670) (second term)
- 1661–: Colonel John Gorges
- 1678–1688: John Skeffington, 2nd Viscount Massereene
- 1688–1689: Colonel Robert Lundy (deserted 1689)
- 1689: Sir George Walker / Henry Baker (died 1689)(jointly)
- 1690: John Mitchelburne
- 1691–1699: Sir Matthew Bridges
- 1699–1714: Clotworthy Skeffington, 3rd Viscount Massereene
- 1714–1719: Thomas Meredyth
- 1719–1734?: Henry Barry, 3rd Baron Barry of Santry
- 1735?–1737: Lieutenant-General Owen Wynne
- 1737–1739: Lieutenant-General Thomas Pearce
- 1739–1740: Charles Cathcart, 8th Lord Cathcart
- 1745–1749: Lieutenant-General Phineas Bowles
- 1749–1756: Lieutenant-General Henry Cornewall
- 1756–1774: Lieutenant-General Sir Robert Rich, 5th Bt
- 1774–1775: General Sir George Augustus Eliott
- 1775–1776: General Sir John Irwin
- 1776–1806: John Hale
- 1806: General The 1st Baron Hutchinson
- 1806–1820: General The 15th Earl of Suffolk
- 1820–1832: Lieutenant-General George Vaughan Hart, M.P.
- 1832–1860: Field Marshal The 1st Earl of Strafford
