= Shutting of the Gates =

Annual event in Derry, Northern Ireland

- Nickname: Lundy's Day
- Status: Active
- Genre: Ulster Unionist
- Begins: First Saturday in December
- Venue: Derry, County Londonderry, Northern Ireland; Glasgow, Scotland
- Country: Northern Ireland; Scotland
- Founders: Apprentice Boys of Derry
- Next event: 5 December 2026
- Marching bands, ABOD Clubs: 3,000-4,000
- Major events: Parades, burning of effigy
- Members: Apprentice Boys of Derry

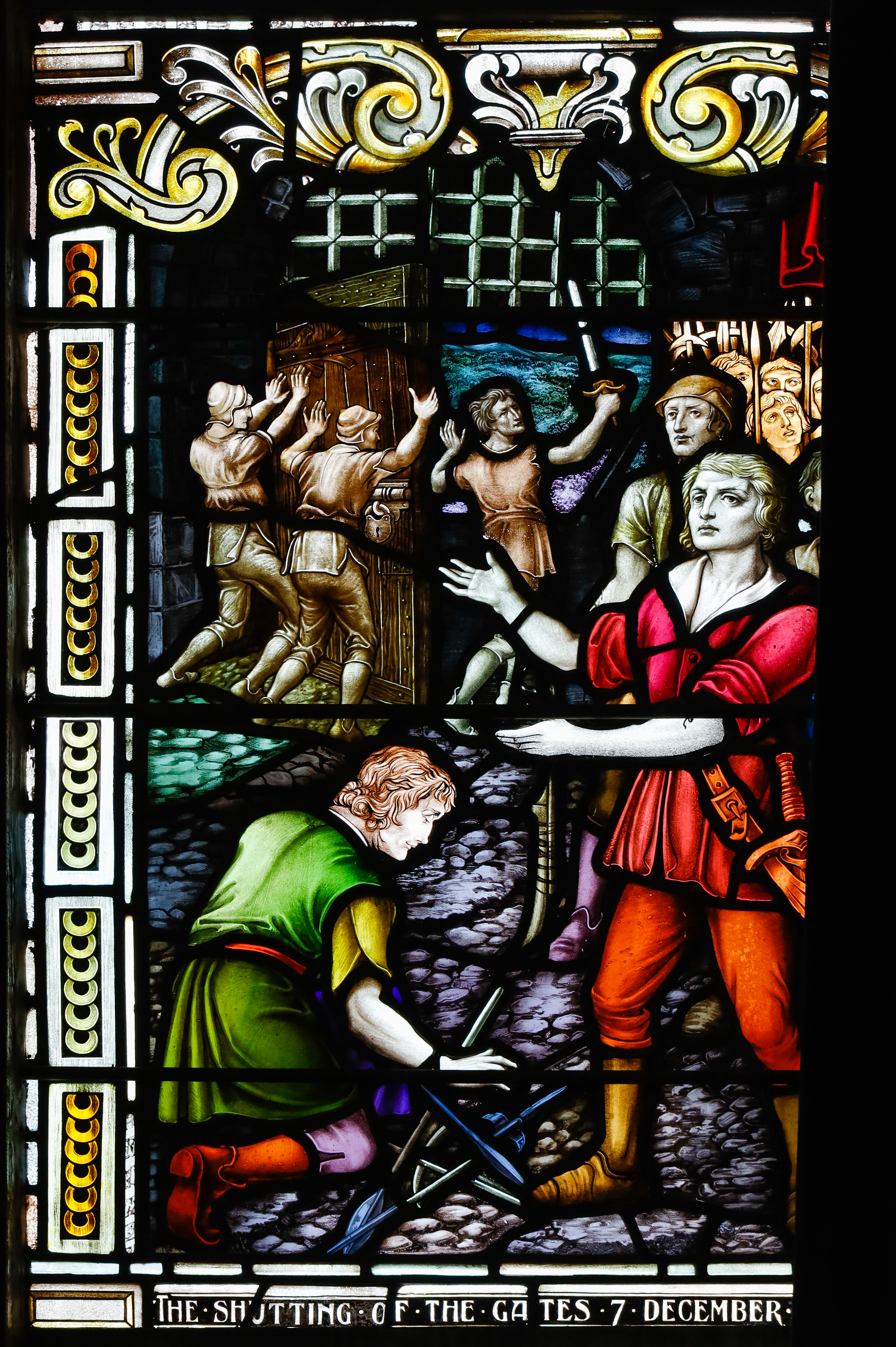
Stained-glass window in the Derry Guildhall depicting “The Shutting of the Gates 7 December 1688

The Shutting of the Gates, also known as Closing of the Gates or Lundy's Day, is an annual cultural and historical day organised by the Apprentice Boys of Derry held in the city of Derry, County Londonderry, Northern Ireland on the first Saturday in December. It commemorates the Brave Thirteen - the closing of the Derry's city gates by thirteen Protestant Apprentice Boys on 7 December 1688, as Catholic Jacobite forces approached the city during the Williamite War in Ireland. The event foreshadowed the historic Siege of Derry in April 1689. Apprentice Boys Clubs are joined by marching bands, and the evening concludes with the burning of an effigy of Robert Lundy, nicknamed "Lundy the Traitor".

A Shutting of the Gates commemoration parade is also held annually in Glasgow, Scotland. It is held by the Scottish Amalgamated Committee of the Apprentice Boys of Derry. It also takes place on the first Saturday in December.

For Ulster Loyalists and Protestants, Lundy's Day is the last main parade of the year of the Loyal Orders.

== Background ==
The event commemorates the anniversary of the opening actions that led to the Siege of Derry, during the Williamite Wars, particularly when thirteen Apprentice Boys, who were loyal to Protestant William of Orange, seized the keys, shut and locked the gates of Derry city walls from the advancing Catholic army of the Earl of Antrim in 1688, who were loyal to James II.

The name "Lundy's Day" derives from Lt. Col. Robert Lundy, who served as Military Governor of Londonderry during the siege. He was dubbed "Lundy the Traitor" after declaring that the city was indefensible following Williamite defeats nearby, and advising surrender to the Jacobite forces. The citizens rejected his counsel and took up arms, forcing Lundy to flee the city in disguise. In defiance, the defenders fought on and the Jacobite's were met with the defenders shouting "No Surrender!", a term that is used as a rallying cry today by Ulster Loyalists and the Orange Order.

The Siege lasted 105 days resulted in an estimated 10,000 people lose their lives. It was the longest siege in British military history.

=== The Thirteen Apprentice Boys ===
The Thirteen Apprentice Boys that closed the gates on the 18th of December were:

- Henry Campsie
- Robert Morrison
- James Steward
- Alex Cunningham
- Alexander Irwin
- James Spike
- John Conningham
- Robert Sherrard
- Daniel Sherrard
- William Cairns
- Samuel Hunt
- William Crookshanks
- Samuel Harvey

== Events ==
There are eight parent clubs associated with Apprentice Boys that commemorate the Shutting of the Gates. Branch clubs are found throughout Ulster, and are also located in other parts of the world, and operate under their associated parent club.

These clubs then travel to Derry for the event, including clubs overseas, such as clubs in Canada and Australia.

=== Londonderry ===
==== Day ====
===== Midnight =====
When the clock strikes midnight on the first Saturday in December, a symbolic firing of cannons takes place on the walls of Derry - firing once, then three times, to signify the "brave thirteen" Apprentice Boys. Thirteen members of a Parent Club make their way to the four original city gates, touching each one in a reenactment of the actions of 1688.

===== Morning =====
Feeder parades take place in towns and villages of local Apprentice Boys Branch Clubs, before travelling to Derry for the main procession. Clubs apply to the Parades Commission to hold feeder parades.

===== Afternoon =====
====== Main parade ======
The main parades steps off in the early afternoon. Visiting Clubs assemble at Waterside Railway Station via Duke Street, travels over the Craigavon Bridge, onto Carlisle Road, Hawkin Street, London Street, Bishop Street, and Palace Lane and ends at the Apprentice Boys Memorial Hall. They are joined by marching bands.

====== First reassembling ======
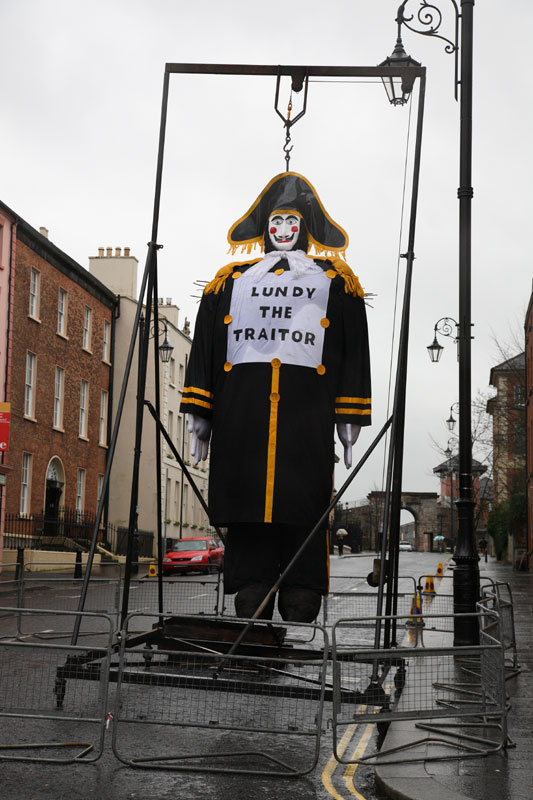
Effigy of Lundy the Traitor

The first reassembling takes place a couple of hours after, reforming on Bishop Street, from there, they march onto London Street, Hawkin Street, Kennedy Street, Kennedy Place, Wapping Lane, Carlisle Square, Carlisle Road, Ferryquay Street, The Diamond, Bishop Street, Society Street, Palace Street, then back to Bishop Street.

====== Second reassembling ======
An hour later, the bands and clubs step off again, visiting branch clubs return to Waterside Railway Station via Craigavon Bridge.

====== Evening ======
An eighteen-foot effigy of Lundy the Traitor is burned on Bishop Street in the evening, marking the conclusion of the Shutting of the Gates commemorations.

=== Glasgow ===
Apprentice Boys Clubs in Scotland and England partake in the annual demonstrations in Glasgow, Scotland, and are organised by the Scottish Amalgamated Committee.

The parade concludes at Glasgow Evangelical Church, Cathedral Square.

== Songs ==
There are several songs that reference the Shutting of the Gates, including one titled "Shutting of the Gates by the Apprentice Boys of Derry" which is sung to the tune of Auld Lang Syne.

The poem The Siege of Derry includes the lyrics: "O child! thou must remember that bleak day in December, when the Prentice-Boys of Derry rose up and shut the gates". It was written and published in the mid-19th century by the hymnwriter Cecil Frances Alexander.

The Crimson Banner, also known as "No Surrender!" references the event in its opening verse: "The closing gate and boyish feat of glorious old December".

"Derry's Walls" is most famously associated with—though not exclusive to—Derry Day and Lundy's Day.

== See also ==
- Imperial Orange Council
- Orange Heritage Week
- Royal Arch Purple
- List of Grand Orange Lodges
- Parades in Northern Ireland
- Banners in Northern Ireland
- Independent Loyal Orange Institution
