= Siege of Derry =

1689 siege of the Williamite War in Ireland

Coordinates: 54.994°N 7.326°W

- Part of the Williamite War in Ireland
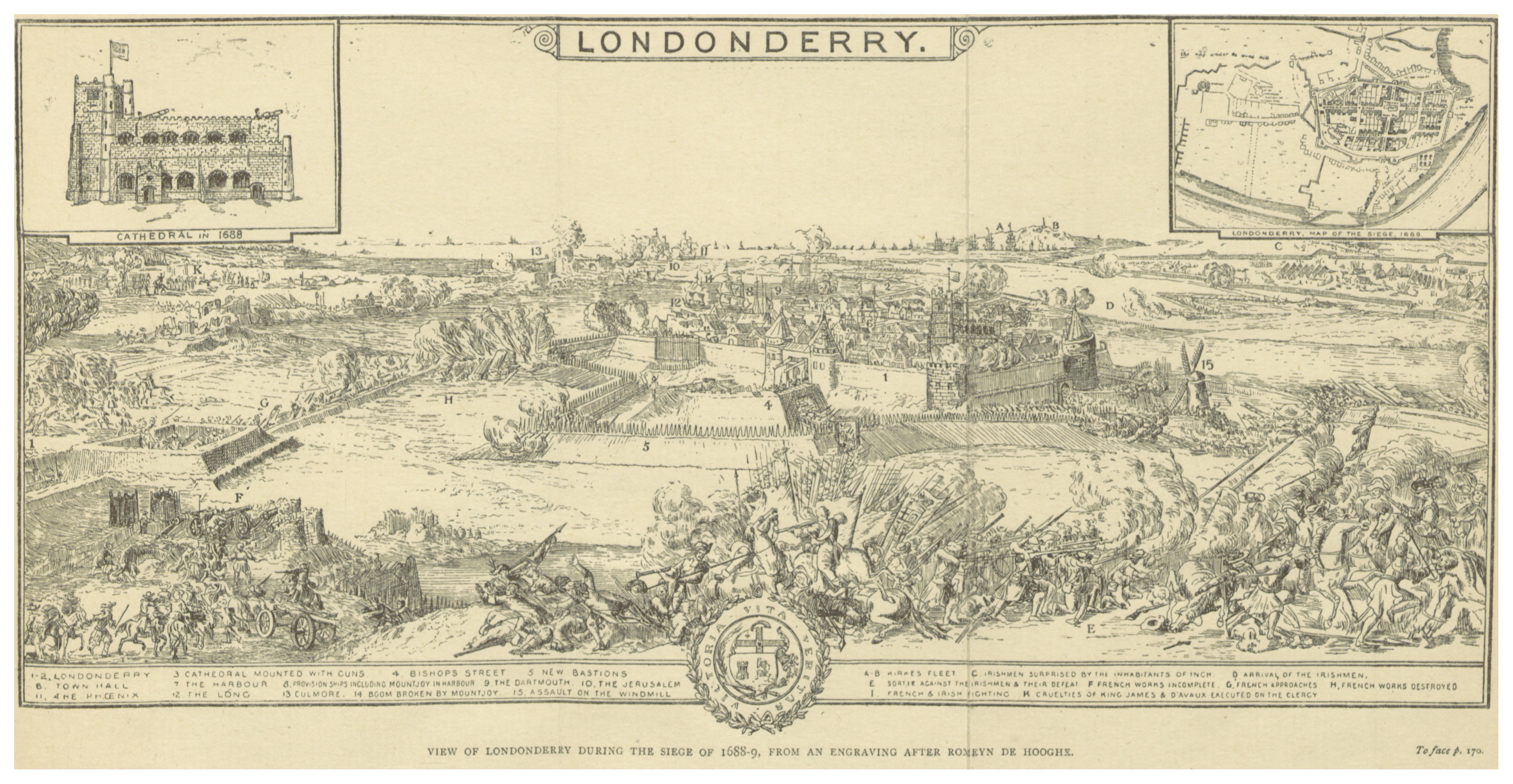
- 1893 illustration of the siege
Date	18 April – 1 August 1689 (3 months and 2 weeks)
Location	Derry, Ireland
Result	Williamite victory

Belligerents
Williamites	Jacobites (Kingdom of France) France

Commanders and leaders
Henry Baker; Adam Murray; George Walker; John Mitchelburne	James II; Richard Hamilton (Kingdom of France) Conrad de Rosen (Kingdom of France) Comte de Maumont †

Strength
~8,000	~21,000

Casualties and losses
4,000 killed (mostly by disease) or wounded	

The siege of Derry in 1689 was the first major event in the Williamite War in Ireland. The siege was preceded by an attempt against the town by Jacobite forces on 7 December 1688 that was foiled when 13 apprentices shut the gates. Closing the gates was an act of rebellion against James II.

The second attempt began on 18 April 1689 when James himself appeared before the walls with an Irish army led by Jacobite and French officers. The town was summoned to surrender but refused. The siege began. The besiegers tried to storm the walls, but failed. They then resorted to starving Derry. They raised the siege and left when supply ships broke through to the town. The siege lasted 105 days from 18 April to 1 August 1689. It is commemorated yearly by the Protestant community.

== Introduction ==
The "Glorious Revolution" overthrew James II, King of England, Scotland, and Ireland and replaced him with William of Orange, who landed in England on 5 November 1688. James fled to France in December. Louis XIV, King of France, received James well because he needed him and his supporters, the Jacobites, as allies in the Nine Years' War, which he had just started by investing Philippsburg on 27 September and declaring war on the Dutch Republic on 6/16 November. (Note: During the period covered in this article, England, Scotland and Ireland used the Julian Calendar (i.e. Old Style), whereas France and the Netherlands used the Gregorian calendar (i.e. New Style). The difference was 10 days at the time. See Old Style and New Style dates.) On 7 May 1689, Williamite England declared war on France, quite belatedly, as French officers and experts had already been fighting William's troops at Derry before that time. This siege was part of the Williamite War in Ireland, which in turn is a side-show of the Nine Years' War.

In Scotland, the privy council asked William to assume responsibility for the government in January 1689, and William and Mary were formally offered the Scottish throne in March. However, many Scottish people, especially among the Highland clans, had sympathies for the Jacobite cause.

Ireland, however, was still ruled by Richard Talbot, Earl of Tyrconnell, whom James had appointed viceroy (i.e. Lord Deputy) in 1687. Tyrconnell was from an Old English (Norman) Catholic family. He had re-admitted Catholics to the Irish Parliament and public office, and had replaced Protestant officers with Catholic ones in the army. Tyrconnell, and Irish Catholics in general, stayed loyal to James and many Irish Protestants hesitated to declare themselves openly for William. Tyrconnell took action against those who did, and by November 1688 only the Protestants of Ulster were still resisting. Two Ulster towns, Enniskillen and Derry, were to become the focal points of the first stage of the Williamite war.

Louis XIV had revoked the Edict of Nantes in 1685, which resulted in Huguenots fleeing to northern Europe and rekindled fears of persecution in Protestant communities.

== Apprentice boys ==
When the Dutch invasion threatened, James doubted the loyalty of his English troops. He therefore asked Tyrconnell to send him reliable Irish ones. These units sailed to Chester in September and early October 1688. To replace them Tyrconnell ordered four new regiments to be raised, one for each Irish province. He ordered Alexander MacDonnell, Earl of Antrim, a Catholic nobleman of Scottish origin, to raise the Ulster regiment. MacDonnell, already in his seventies, hired 1,200 Scottish mercenaries (called redshanks), making sure they were all Catholics. The unit was supposed to be ready on 20 November, but delays occurred.

At that time Tyrconnell's recast of the Irish army had advanced so far that few units still had significant numbers of Protestants. One of those was the regiment of Viscount Mountjoy, a Protestant loyal to James. This unit was in garrison at Derry. Tyrconnell considered Mountjoy's regiment unreliable and on 23 November ordered it to march to Dublin. Mountjoy's regiment was to be replaced by MacDonnell's, which was not ready so that Derry was left without a garrison.

When MacDonnell finally got his troops on the way, he met Colonel George Philips at Newtown Limavady, who immediately sent a messenger to Derry to warn the city. On 7 December, with MacDonnell's regiment ready to cross the Foyle River under Derry's Ferryquay Gate, 13 apprentices seized the city's keys and locked the gates. With this act Derry was in open rebellion against Tyrconnell and his master James II, who was already in exile in France at that time. MacDonnell was not strong enough to take the town by force and retreated to Coleraine.

== Interlude ==
Later generations have sometimes seen the shutting of the gates by the apprentices as the start of the siege. In reality, six peaceful months passed between the apprentices' action (7 December) and the start of the siege (18 April 1689). In a similar way Robert Lundy's blunders, flight, and supposed treachery (see further down) are often telescoped into the days of the apprentices' action, while in reality, they fell into the lead-up to the siege in June 1689.

On 9 December Philips came into town. As he had been governor of Derry and Fort Culmore under Charles I, the citizens gave him the keys and accepted him as de facto governor. When Tyrconnell heard that MacDonnell had been kept out of Derry, he stopped Mountjoy on his march to Dublin and sent him back. On 21 December Mountjoy reached Derry. He struck a deal with the city, according to which two of his companies, consisting entirely of Protestants, would be allowed into town. The one was commanded by Lieutenant-Colonel Robert Lundy, the other by Captain William Stewart. (Note: William Stewart was the grandfather of the first Marquess of Londonderry.)

Mountjoy appointed Lundy governor of the town instead of Philips. On 20 February the inhabitants sided with William by proclaiming him king of England. Lundy had the walls and the gates repaired, refitted gun carriages and musket stocks, removed buildings and other obstacles that might provide cover to besiegers from before the walls, purchased powder, cannonballs and matchlocks.

Tyrconnell upscaled his efforts to bring Ulster back under control, and on 8 March he sent Lieutenant-General Richard Hamilton with an army of 2500 from Drogheda into Ulster. On 14 March Hamilton defeated the Protestant Army of the North at the Break of Dromore in County Down.

In the meantime, on 12 March, (Note: Most authors agree that James landed on 12 March, but FitzJames, the James FitzJames, Duke of Berwick, gives this date as 17 March.) James had landed at Kinsale (on Ireland's south coast) with a French fleet of 30 men-of-war commanded by Jean Gabaret. He was accompanied by d'Avaux, the French ambassador, many English and Irish exiles, and about a hundred French officers. He brought with him money and equipment, but few troops. French troops were needed on the continent for the Nine Years' War and were not considered necessary in Ireland as Tyrconnell had already raised a large army and only lacked equipment and the money to pay the men.

At Kinsale, James was received by Donogh MacCarthy, 4th Earl of Clancarty, in his house there. We will meet him again at Derry. From Kinsale James proceeded to Cork where he met Tyrconnell. He left Cork on 20 March and entered Dublin on Palm Sunday 24. He took up quarters in the castle and established his council on which sat d'Avaux, Tyrconnell, John Drummond, Earl of Melfort, and Conrad de Rosen.

Hearing of James's arrival, Derry prepared to defend itself. On 20 or 21 March Captain James Hamilton arrived from England with the frigate HMS Jersey and the merchantman Deliverance, bringing gunpowder, munition, weapons, and £595 in cash. James Hamilton was a nephew of Richard Hamilton but fought on the other side. These provisions were to be crucial during the siege. He also brought the commission from King William and Queen Mary that confirmed Colonel Lundy as the town's Williamite governor. Lundy swore the oath of allegiance to William in the cabin of the Jersey. The town committee decided to build a ravelin in front of the Bishops Gate, possibly using some of the money brought by Captain Hamilton.

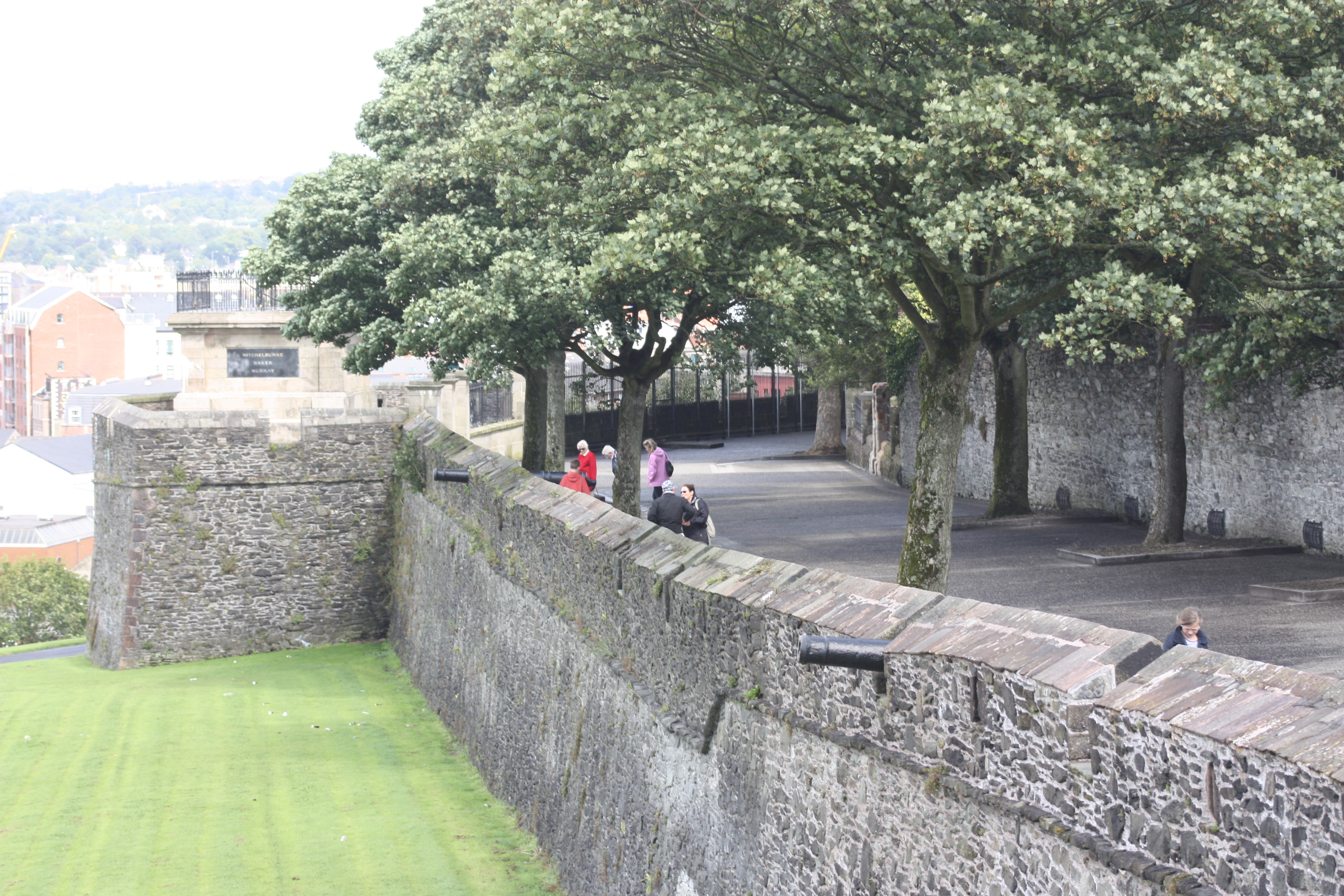
The wall at the Royal Bastion in 2009. Note the plinth of Walker's Pillar on the bastion.

== Siege ==
Tyrconnell and James decided to bring Derry back under their control. On 2 or 3 April Major-General Jean Camus, Marquis de Pusignan, marched north with five regiments of foot. This brought the number of troops in the north to about 12000. James followed on 8 April, accompanied by d'Avaux and Melfort.

=== The passes ===
On 13 April cavalry forming part of the Jacobite vanguard was reported approaching Derry. Lundy called a council of war that decided to defend a line along the River Finn, SW of Derry, near Strabane. Passes over the river at Castlefin, Clady, Long Causeway, and Lifford were manned. On 15 April, this line was attacked by the cavalry vanguards of the two Jacobite armies, Hamilton's, which had come from Coleraine, and Rosen's, which had come from Dublin via Charlemont. Hamilton's cavalry attacked on the Jacobites' left wing at Castlefinn and Clady. At Castlefinn they were repulsed by Colonel Skeffington's Regiment, commanded by John Mitchelburne, but at Clady the cavalry under Richard Hamilton and Berwick swam through the river and routed the defenders. This has been called the Battle of Cladyford. The Long Causeway was not attacked. Rosen's cavalry attacked on the right wing, at Lifford where Jacques de Fontanges, comte de Maumont crossed the river at the head of his cavalry and broke through the defences.

=== Lundy's blunder ===
In the meantime, the English sent reinforcements to Derry. On the very day of the defeat at the Passes, on 15 April, Colonel Cunningham and Colonel Richards arrived on Lough Foyle with the frigate HMS Swallow, commanded by Captain Wolfran Cornewall, and nine transport ships carrying two regiments, altogether about 1600 men. Cunningham, who was in charge, had been instructed to take his orders from Lundy, the governor. Lundy, disheartened by his defeat at the Passes, was convinced that the town was lost. On 16 April Lundy held a council of war with Cunningham and Richards from which he excluded most of the local commanders. He proposed the troops should not land and the town should be abandoned pretending that there were insufficient provisions to defend it.

The proposal was accepted by all present. Lundy kept this resolution secret, but the people in town could see that many of the gentry and officers that had been present in the council prepared to leave and went down to the river to board the ships. Cunningham's fleet waited for Lundy still on 17 April but then left, apparently without him. The ships stopped over at Greencastle on 18 April and sailed for England on 19 April. Finally, Lundy left the city disguised as an ordinary soldier and took a ship to Scotland.

=== Under the walls ===
Having broken through the passes, Hamilton reached Derry on 18 April and summoned the city to surrender. The defenders asked for a delay of two days before a parley. They also insisted that the Jacobite army should halt at St Johnston and not come nearer. However, when King James joined up with the army, Rosen suggested the King should appeal directly to his subjects in the town: they would surely submit to their King. The effect was the contrary. The men on the wall seeing him approach interpreted this act as a breach of their agreement with Hamilton and when James and his retinue rode up to within 300 yards of Bishops Gate and summoned the city, cannons were fired at them.

According to a later account, he was rebuffed with shouts of "No surrender!" and one of the king's aides-de-camp was killed by a shot from the city's largest cannon, the "Roaring Meg". James would ask thrice more, but was refused each time.

That same day Adam Murray reached the town. He and his cavalry unit had been part of the Protestant Army of the North and had fought at the passes. He came from Culmore along the river, broke through the still quite loose ring formed by the besiegers around the town, and reached Shipquay Gate, which Captain Morrison opened for him.

On 19 April the town council appointed Henry Baker governor of Derry. Baker put George Walker in charge of the stores.

On 20 April King James sent Claud Hamilton, 4th Earl of Abercorn, with a last proposal to the walls. Murray talked with him and rejected it. (Note: The Earl of Abercorn also was Baron Hamilton of Strabane and owned much land around that town.) James returned to Dublin with Rosen and left the forces before Derry under Maumont's command. However, Richard Hamilton also stayed and was of equal rank. Both had been promoted Lieutenant-General quite recently. Frictions sometimes arose between the Irish and the French officers about who was in command.

On 21 April the besieged, led by Murray, sallied and killed Maumont. This has also been called the Battle of Pennyburn. Command devolved to Richard Hamilton. On 23 April Fort Culmore, which guarded the mouth of River Foyle, surrendered to the Jacobites. During another sally, on 25 April, the Duke of Berwick and Bernard Desjean, Baron de Pointis, were wounded and Pusignan killed.

On 6 May Brigadier-General Ramsay attacked the Windmill Hill before the Bishops Gate and drove out the sentinels posted there by the besieged, but Baker knew the importance of this position and on the next day, the besieged sallied from the Ferryquay Gate and retook Windmill Hill. Ramsay was killed and other officers were taken prisoners. Among them were William Talbot, a nephew of the viceroy, Viscount Netterville and Gerald FitzGerald, Knight of Glin. Baker built a line of earthworks from the river up to Windmill Hill and back through the Bog to the river downstream of the town.

On 7 May Williamite England formally declared war on France. This officially sanctioned what was already happening around Derry since 18 April. Two French generals, Maumont and Pusignan, had already been killed in the siege. France never declared war on England as they saw James as the rightful king and the Williamites as mere rebels.

On 11 May a French fleet landed more equipment and troops at Bantry Bay in southwestern Ireland and fought the battle of Bantry Bay against an English fleet. The battle was inconclusive, but the French seemed to have had the advantage.

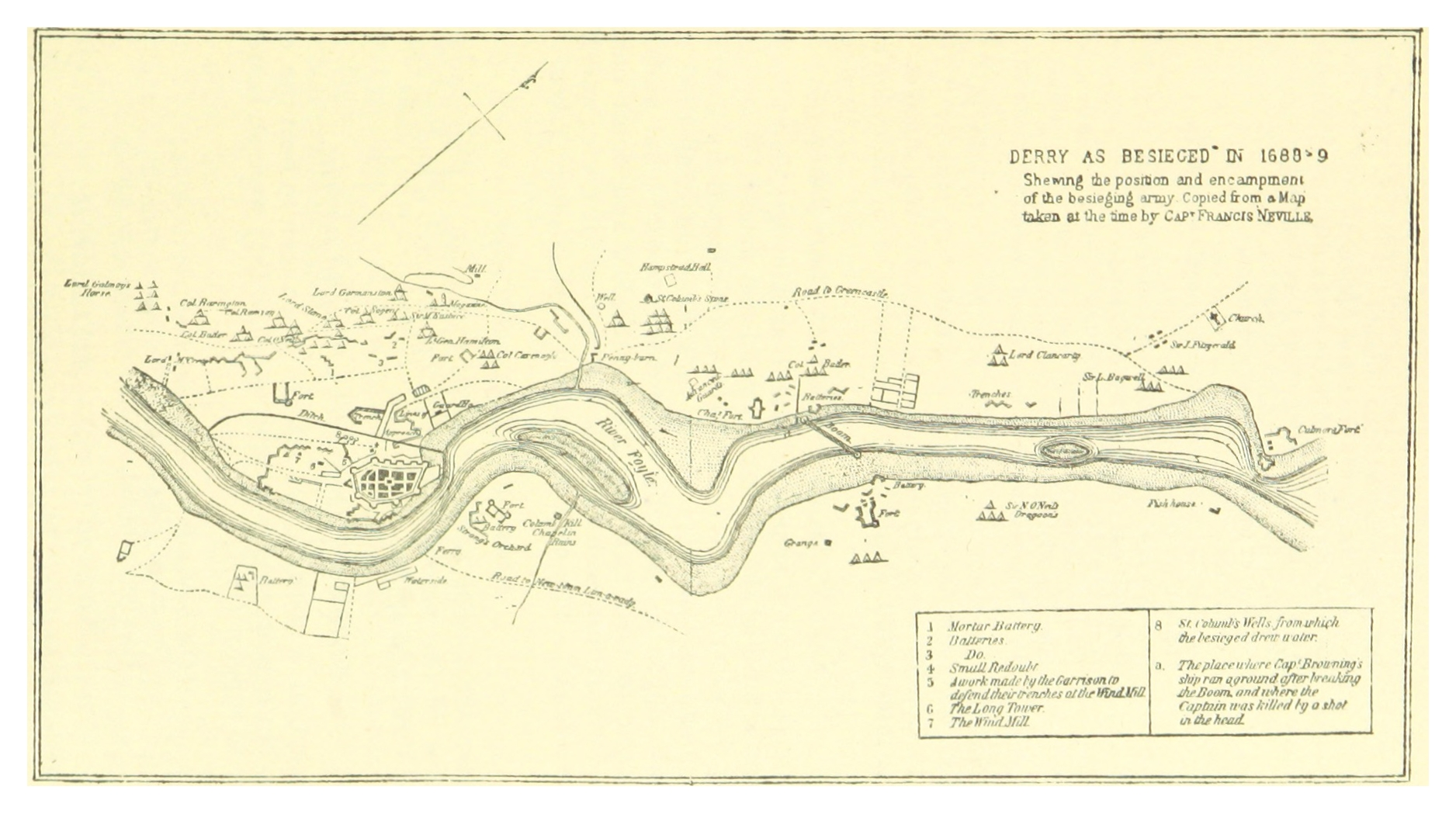
Map of the River Foyle from Derry (left) to Culmore (right) with the boom in the centre

On 30 May the besiegers received heavy guns and mortars. Before that date they only had field artillery. Matthew Plunkett, 7th Baron Louth, and de Pointis were in charge of the mortars, which were placed on the right bank of the river where no sally could reach them. The mortars fired almost 600 explosive shells into the town.

About this time disease and hunger took hold within the city. It became evident that the town needed to be relieved. William gave that task to Major-General Percy Kirke, who decided to first explore the mouth of River Foyle to find out whether ships could get through to Derry. He sent the engineer Jacob Richards, son of Solomon Richards, mentioned earlier, with the small (sixth-rate) frigate HMS Greyhound and two ketches. They sailed from Hoylake on 13 May and explored the mouth of River Foyle on 8 June. However, Greyhound ran aground near Fort Culmore and was damaged by cannon shot before she got afloat, escaped and after some makeshift repairs limped back to Greenock in Scotland to refit. Observations and information obtained from the inhabitants confirmed that the besiegers had placed a boom across the river. Indeed, on 3 June, the besiegers, led by de Pointis, had placed a boom across the River Foyle about halfway between Derry and Culmore.

On 17 May Major-General Percy Kirke sailed from Liverpool with three men-of-war (HMS Swallow, HMS Bonaventure, and HMS Dartmouth) and 24 transport ships. The fleet carried four regiments (about 3000 men: Kirke's own, Sir John Hanmer's, William Stewart's and St George's). The last two were the regiments that should have landed with Cunningham. The convoy arrived in Lough Foyle early in June. The besieged saw it from the cathedral tower on the 13th.

Kirke thought that he had too few troops to challenge the besiegers in battle and the incident with the Greyhound seemed to show that it was too risky to approach the town by the river.

On 4 June Richard Hamilton ordered to storm the town. The Jacobites attacked the line of earthworks and passed over them in some places but were finally beaten back.

In order to accelerate the siege, James sent Rosen to Derry, who arrived on the scene at some time between 17 and 24 June. Rosen brought with him the regiment FitzGerald from Trim. On 21 June Berwick was sent south with a detachment to keep the Enniskilleners away. Rosen intensified the bombardment and had a mine dug under a bastion.

On 28 June Clancarty came up from Munster to Derry with his regiment and led a daring night attack against the Butcher's Gate immediately on the evening of his arrival. The besieged were surprised and the attackers succeeded to come up against the gate and touch it but were eventually thrown back.

At the beginning of June, Governor Baker fell ill and on 21 June a council was held to choose a successor. Baker was consulted and chose John Mitchelburne. On 30 June Baker died and Mitchelburne became governor of Derry.

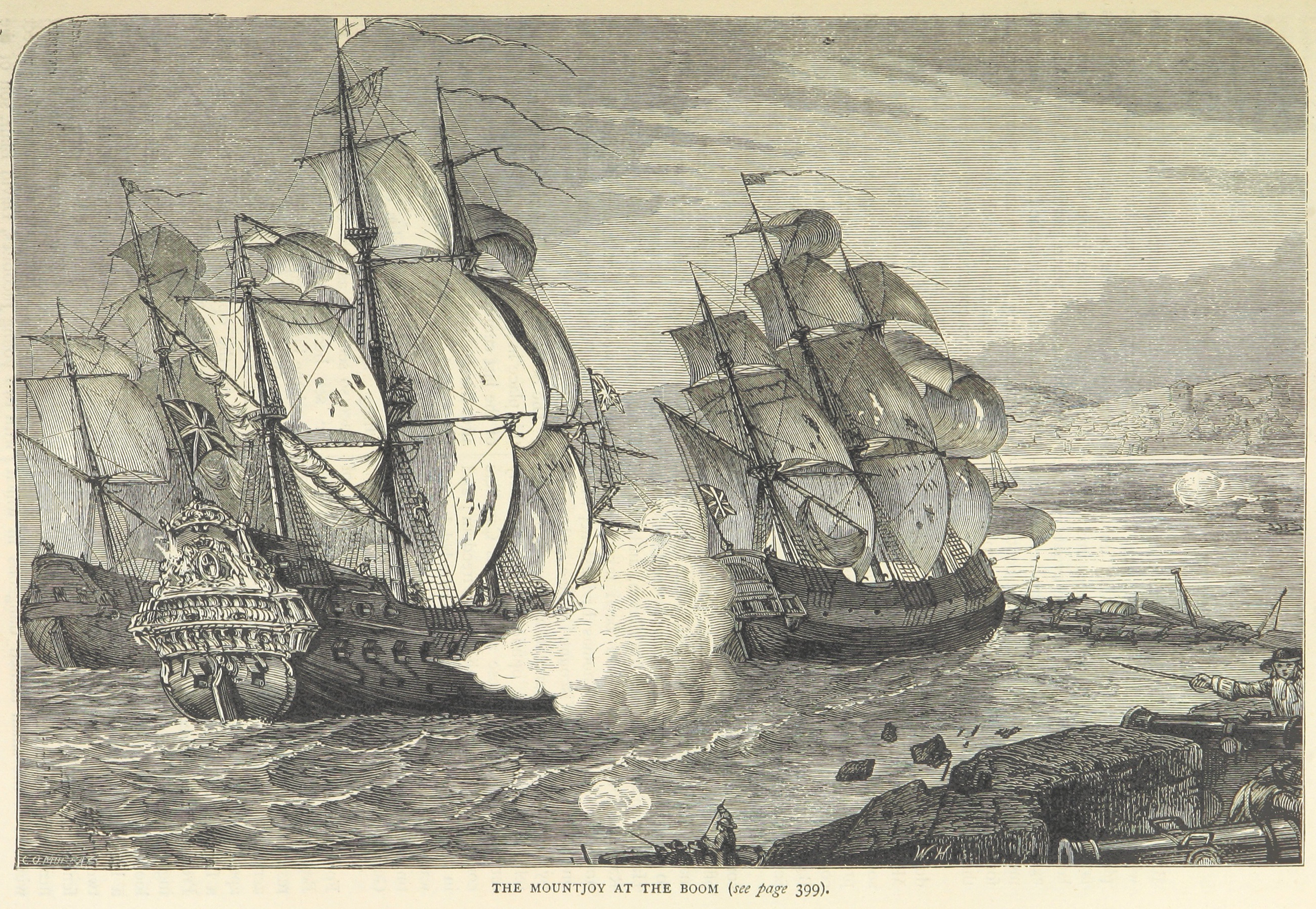
HMS Dartmouth fires at shore batteries while Mountjoy rams through the boom.

On 2 July Rosen herded Protestants from the surroundings to under the wall. The besieged responded by threatening to kill prisoners. Hamilton reported this event to James, who disagreed with Rosen's measure and called him a "barbarious Muscovite".

=== Relief ===
Frederick de Schomberg, having been appointed commander-in-chief by William, ordered Kirke to attack the boom. Thereupon, on 28 July, Kirke sent four ships to the mouth of the River Foyle to try to bring food into Derry. These were HMS Dartmouth and three merchant ships: Mountjoy from Derry, Phoenix from Coleraine, and Jerusalem. Dartmouth, under Captain John Leake, engaged the shore batteries, while Mountjoy, commanded by her Master Michael Browning, rammed and breached the boom, whereupon Mountjoy and Phoenix sailed up to Derry, unloading many tons of food. Seeing that he could no longer starve out Derry and not having enough troops to storm the town, Rosen decided to raise the siege. On 1 August the besieged discovered that the enemy was gone. On 3 August Kirke reported the raising of the siege to London. On 31 July another Jacobite army had been defeated at Newtownbutler by the Enniskilleners.

A memorial plaque on a wall showing a sailing ship over some text. The Michael Browning Memorial Plaque on Derry's wall

The city had endured 105 days of siege, from 18 April to 1 August. Some 4,000 of its garrison of 8,000 are said to have died during this siege.

Timeline
The dates listed below are all in old style, but some of the dates in the citations may be New Style.
1688, 7 Dec	Shutting of the gates
1688, late Dec	Viscount Mountjoy appointed Lundy governor of Derry.
1689, 12 Mar	King James II landed at Kinsale.
1689, 20 Mar	Captain James Hamilton brought provisions.
1689, 15 Apr	The Jacobites forced the passage of the River Finn.
1689, 18 Apr	King James before the Bishops Gate; the siege began.
1689, 19 Apr	Baker appointed governor.
1689, 21 Apr	Maumont killed.
1689, 23 Apr	Fort Culmore surrendered.
1689, 6 May	Ramsay killed at the Windmill Hill.
1689, 30 May	Siege guns arrived and the bombardment started.
1689, 3 Jun	Boom placed across the river. (Note: The dates in the Gazette de France are New Style.)
1689, 8 Jun	HMS Greyhound explored the mouth of River Foyle.
1689, 13 Jun	Major General Kirke's fleet arrived in Lough Foyle.
1689, 2nd 1/2 of Jun	Rosen arrived before Derry.
1689, 28 Jun	Clancarty attacked the Butcher's Gate.
1689, 30 Jun	Governor Baker died and was succeeded by Mitchelburne.
1689, 2 Jul	Rosen herded Protestant civilians to the walls.
1689, 29 Jul	Ships broke through to the town.
1689, 1 Aug	The Jacobites abandoned the siege and retreated southwards.

== Commemorations ==
The Siege of Derry, like the Battle of the Boyne, is part of Northern Irish Protestant folklore. The siege is commemorated by two parades: the Shutting-of-the-Gates Parade and the Relief-of-Derry Parade.

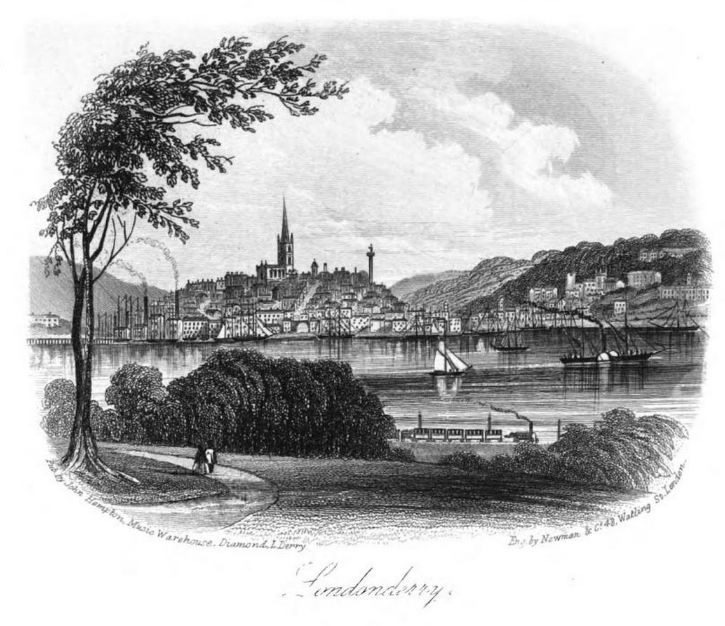
A view of Derry in the 19th century. Walker's Pillar figures prominently in the centre.

The shutting of the gates by 13 apprentices, which happened on 7 December 1688, is commemorated each year on the first Saturday of December, dubbed "Lundy's Day". The commemoration is organised by the Apprentice Boys of Derry, a Protestant association. The day usually starts with the firing of one and then three cannon shots, meaning 13, from the walls at midnight on Friday. Then follows the ceremony of the touching of the four original gates: Bishops Gate, Butchers Gate, Shipquay Gate, and Ferryquay Gate. On Saturday, first the members of the Apprentice Boys clubs domiciled outside the walls march to the Apprentice Boys Memorial Hall. Then the assembled members march through the city from the Hall to St Columb's Cathedral where a thanks-giving service is held. After the service, a wreath is laid at the Siege Heroes Mound in the cathedral grounds. Finally, Lundy is burned in effigy as a traitor.

The end of the siege, which is taken to have happened on 1 August 1689, old style, when the besieged discovered that the besiegers had left, is celebrated by the Relief of Derry parade, usually held on the second Saturday of August. This day is chosen because it usually is near 11 August, which is the New Style equivalent of 1 August. This parade is one of the events of the week-long Maiden City Festival. On 1 August 1714, Mitchelburne hoisted a crimson flag on the steeple of St Columb's Cathedral to mark the anniversary of the relief of the city, a practice that continued for many years. In 1969 a confrontation between Protestants and Catholics during the Relief of Derry parade started the Battle of the Bogside, but recent parades have been largely peaceful.

Walker's Pillar was a monument to Reverend George Walker. It was built from 1826 to 1828 on the Royal Bastion. The monument consisted of a column crowned by a statue of the famous man. On the night of 27 August 1973, it was blown up by the Provisional IRA. The plinth remains.

The Browning Memorial Plaque is affixed to the city wall on Guildhall Square. It commemorates Michael (or Micaiah) Browning, the Master of the Mountjoy. The top shows his ship, the Mountjoy. The inscription below cites the passage describing his death in Macaulay's History of England, which calls his: the most enviable of all deaths.

The popular song "Derry's Walls" commemorates the siege. The author is unknown. The chorus reads:

We'll fight and don't surrender
But come when duty calls,
With heart and hand and sword and shield
We'll guard old Derry's Walls.

== Notes and references ==
=== Sources ===
- Anonymous (1689). Ireland's Lamentation. London: J. D.
- Bagwell, Richard (1896). "Philips or Phillips, George (1599?–1696)". In Lee, Sidney (ed.). Dictionary of National Biography. Vol. XLV. London: Smith, Elder & Co. pp. 174–175. OCLC 8544105.
- Bouillet, Jean-Baptiste (1848). Nobiliaire d'Auvergne (in French). Vol. III. Clermont-Ferrand: Pérol. OCLC 422187531. – F to L (for Fontange, comte de Maumont)
- Boulger, Demetrius Charles (1911). The Battle of the Boyne. London: Martin Secker. OCLC 1041056932.
- Chichester, Henry Manners (1890). "Hamilton, Richard (fl. 1688)". In Lee, Sidney (ed.). Dictionary of National Biography. Vol. XXIV. New York: MacMillan and Co. pp. 203–204. OCLC 8544105.
- Childs, John (2007). The Williamite Wars in Ireland 1688–1691. London: Hambledon Continuum Press. ISBN 978-1-85285-573-4. – (Preview)
- De Dublin, le 18 May 1689 (in French). 11 June 1689.
- De Paris le 21 May 1689 (in French). 21 May 1689.
- De Paris, le 16 Iuillet 1689 (in French). 16 July 1689.
- De Londres, le 25 Iuillet 1689 (in French). 30 July 1689.
- Doherty, Richard (2008). The Siege of Derry 1689 - The Military History. Chalford: Spellmount. ISBN 978-0-7524-5536-5.
- FitzJames, James FitzJames, the Duke of Berwick (1778). Mémoires du Maréchal de Berwick (in French). Vol. Tome premier. Paris: Moutard. OCLC 1049657563.
- Gibney, John (March 2021). McGuire, James; Quinn, James (eds.). "Michelburne (Michelborne, Mitchelburne), John". Dictionary of Irish Biography.
- Graham, Rev. John (1829). A History of the Siege of Londonderry and Defence of Enniskillen in 1688–9 (2nd ed.). Dublin: William Curry. OCLC 19596078.
- Hempton, John, ed. (1861). The Siege and History of Londonderry. Londonderry: John Hempton. OCLC 1084893815.
- Hogan, James, ed. (1958). Négociations de M Le Comte D'Avaux en Irlande (1689–90) Supplementary Volume. Dublin: Irish Manuscripts Commission.
- Joyce, Patrick Weston (1903). A Concise History of Ireland from the Earliest Times to 1837 (12th ed.). Dublin: M. H. Gill & Son. OCLC 815623752.
- La Chesnaye des Bois, François Alexandre Aubert de (1771). Dictionnaire de la noblesse (in French). Vol. III (2nd ed.). Paris: Duchesne. OCLC 491609675. – BOU to CAS
- Lainé, Louis (1818). Dictionnaire véridique des origines des maisons nobles ou anoblis du royaume de France (in French). Vol. Tome premier. Paris: Chez l'auteur, rue de la Vrillière. – A to F
- "Baker Club jewel". Londonderry Sentinel. 13 January 2011.
- Macaulay, Thomas Babington (1855). The History of England from the Accession of James the Second. Vol. III. London: Longman Brown Greens & Longmans. OCLC 1046525672. – 1689 to 1690
- MacGeoghegan, James (1763). Histoire de l'Irlande ancienne et modern, tirée des Monuments les plus authentiques [History of Ancient and Modern Ireland] (in French). Vol. Tome troisième. Paris: Antoine Boudet. – 1558 to 1699
- Mackenzie, John (1690). A Narrative of the Siege of Londonderry. London: Richard Baldwin. OCLC 220182259.
- Macpherson, James (1775). Original Papers; Containing the Secret History of Great Britain, from the Restoration to the Accession of the House of Hanover. To which are Prefixed Extracts from the Life of James II. Written by Himself. London: W Strahan and T Cadell. OCLC 1050258341.
- McBride, Ian (1997). The Siege of Derry in Ulster Protestant Mythology. Dublin: Four Courts Press. ISBN 1-85182-299-2.
- O'Kelly, Charles (1850) [1st pub. 1692]. O'Callaghan, John Cornelius (ed.). Macariae Excidium or The Destruction of Cyprus (1850 ed.). Dublin: Irish Archaeological Society. OCLC 19248699.
- Puaux, Frank (1911). "Huguenots" . In Chisholm, Hugh (ed.). Encyclopædia Britannica. Vol. 13 (11th ed.). Cambridge University Press. pp. 864–869.
- Seccombe, Thomas (1893). "MacCarthy or MacCarty, Donough, fourth Earl of Clancarty". In Lee, Sidney (ed.). Dictionary of National Biography. Vol. XXXIV. London: Smith, Elder, & Co. pp. 436–438. OCLC 8544105.
- Walker, Rev. George (1893). Dwyer, Rev. Philip (ed.). The siege of Londonderry in 1689, as set forth in the Literary Remains of Colonel the Rev. George Walker, D.D. London: Robert Clavel & Ralph Simpson. OCLC 79434854.
- Wauchope, Piers (2004). "Hamilton, Richard (d. 1717)". In Matthew, Colin; Harrison, Brian (eds.). Oxford Dictionary of National Biography. Vol. 24. New York: Oxford University Press. pp. 888–889, right column. ISBN 0-19-861374-1.
- Wills, Rev. James (1841). "David Cairnes. Born A.D. 1645—died 1722". Lives of Illustrious and Distinguished Irishmen, from the earliest times to the present period. Vol. III. Dublin: MacGregor, Polson & Co. pp. 323–331. OCLC 1048786228.
- Witherow, Thomas (1879). Derry and Enniskillen in the Year 1689. London & Belfast: William Mallan & Son. OCLC 82779901.
