= Sir Robert Rich, 5th Baronet =

British Army general (1717–1785)

Lieutenant-General Sir Robert Rich Bt
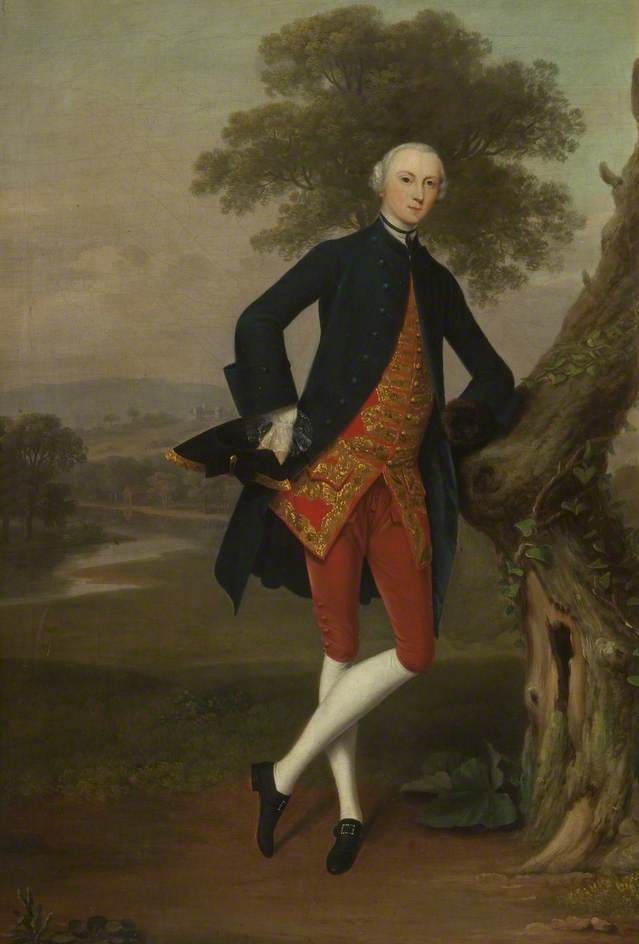
- Portrait by Arthur Devis, 1756
- Born: 1717
- Died: 19 May 1785 (aged 67–68); Bath, Somerset
- Burial place: Grosvenor Chapel
- Education: Westminster School
- Spouses: Mary Ludlow (m. 1752–1755) Elizabeth Williams (m. 1771–1785)
- Children: 2
- Relatives: Sir Robert Rich, 4th Baronet (father); Elizabeth Griffith (mother)
- Military career
- Allegiance: Kingdom of Great Britain
- Branch: British Army
- Service years: 1735–1774
- Rank: Lieutenant-General
- Unit: 1st Foot Guards
- Commands: 4th Regiment of Foot; Governor of Londonderry
- Conflicts: War of the Austrian Succession; Jacobite Rising of 1745; Battle of Falkirk Muir; Battle of Culloden (WIA)

Lieutenant-General Sir Robert Rich, 5th Baronet (1717 – 19 May 1785) was a British Army general and Governor of Londonderry and Culmore.

He fought at the Battle of Culloden in 1746 as colonel of the 4th King's Own (Barrell's) Regiment, where he lost his left hand to a sword cut and nearly lost the right forearm to another, in addition to six cuts to his head.

In 1756 he was appointed Governor of Londonderry and Culmore, in Ireland, and in 1760, made a Lieutenant-General.

He married Mary, sister of Peter Ludlow, 1st Earl Ludlow, and had an only daughter, Mary Frances. She married on 4 January 1784 the Reverend Charles Bostock of Shirley House, Hampshire.

On 4 May 1785, he died at Bath, Somerset. He left his estates to his daughter. These included Waverley Abbey in Surrey and Roos Hall in Suffolk.

The baronetcy passed to his brother, George. His son-in-law, Charles, assumed the surname of Rich in 1790 and was himself created a baronet in 1791. He died on 19 May 1785 at age 68.

Military offices
Preceded by William Barrell	Colonel of the 4th (King's Own) Regiment of Foot; 1749–1756	Succeeded by Alexander Duroure
Preceded by Henry Cornewall	Governor of Londonderry; 1756–1774	Succeeded by George Augustus Eliott
Baronetage of England
Preceded by Robert Rich	Baronet (of London); 1768–1785	Succeeded by George Rich
