= Robert Ramsay (Jacobite) =

Scottish soldier (d. 1689)

Robert Ramsay (died 1689) was a Scottish Jacobite soldier noted for his service during the Williamite War in Ireland. A Roman Catholic and veteran of the "French Brigade" which served in the Third Anglo-Dutch War under the Duke of Monmouth, Ramsay held the post of Adjutant-General of Foot in the English Army prior to the deposition of James II in the 1688 Glorious Revolution.

He reached the rank of Brigadier in the Irish Army. He seems have been the "Colonel Ramsey" that went north with Major-General Jean Camus, Marquis de Pusignan, after the arrival of James II at Dublin. During the Siege of Derry he took part in a Jacobite attempt to seize Windmill Hill, and was killed there. His loss was a major blow to the Jacobites as he was appreciated as one of the best officers in the army. He was buried at Long Tower where the Catholic Long Tower Church is now.

His surname is sometimes spelled Ramsey. He is occasionally confused with his kinsman George Ramsay, 3rd son of the 2nd Earl of Dalhousie, who served in the Scots Brigade of the Dutch Republic.
