= Apprentice Boys of Derry =

Protestant fraternal society based in Northern Ireland

- Logo of the associated clubs of the Apprentice Boys of Derry

- A flag of the Apprentice Boys
- Formation: 1814
- Headquarters: Derry, Northern Ireland
- Region served: Northern Ireland; Republic of Ireland; Scotland; England; Canada; Australia
- Subsidiaries: The associated clubs of the Apprentice Boys of Derry
- Website: apprenticeboysofderry.org

The Apprentice Boys of Derry are a Protestant fraternal society founded in 1814 and based in the city of Derry, Northern Ireland. Outside Northern Ireland, there are branches in Scotland, England, the Republic of Ireland, Australia and Canada. In 2021, the society had over 10,000 members worldwide, with membership open to Protestant men only. The society commemorates the 1689 Siege of Derry, a failed attempt by the Roman Catholic James II to capture the city, which was at the time a Protestant stronghold. Apprentice Boys parades once regularly led to virulent opposition from the city's Catholic majority, but recently a more conciliatory approach has taken place and now the parades are virtually trouble-free. The 2014 "Shutting of the Gates" parade was described as "the biggest in years" and was violence-free.

== Siege of Derry ==
The siege of Derry began in December 1688 when 13 apprentice boys shut the gates of the city against a regiment of twelve hundred Jacobite soldiers, commanded by the Roman Catholic Alexander Macdonnell, Earl of Antrim, which was immediately withdrawn. Retaliatory action passed to the Duke of Tyrconnel who assembled a large but poorly ordered Jacobite force commanded by Sir Richard Hamilton to march north against the Ulster Protestants. The deposed King James II, who had travelled from France to Ireland in March, took charge with the aid of two French generals. Arriving at the gates of Derry on 18 April 1689, he was greeted by a cry of "No surrender!" The siege was lifted on 28 July 1689 (Old Style) when two armed merchant ships, the Mountjoy and the Phoenix, sailed up the River Foyle to breach a timber boom which had been stretched across the river, blocking supplies to the city. The ships' approach was covered against the Jacobite besiegers by cannon fire from the frigate HMS Dartmouth, under Captain (and future Admiral) John Leake. The Mountjoy rammed and broke the barricading boom at Culmore fort and the ships moved in, unloading many tons of food to relieve the siege. Three days later, the besieging forces burned their camps and departed. It was reported that some 4,000 people (about half the population of the city) had died of starvation or injury. Many had been forced to eat dogs, horses and rats.

== Celebrations ==
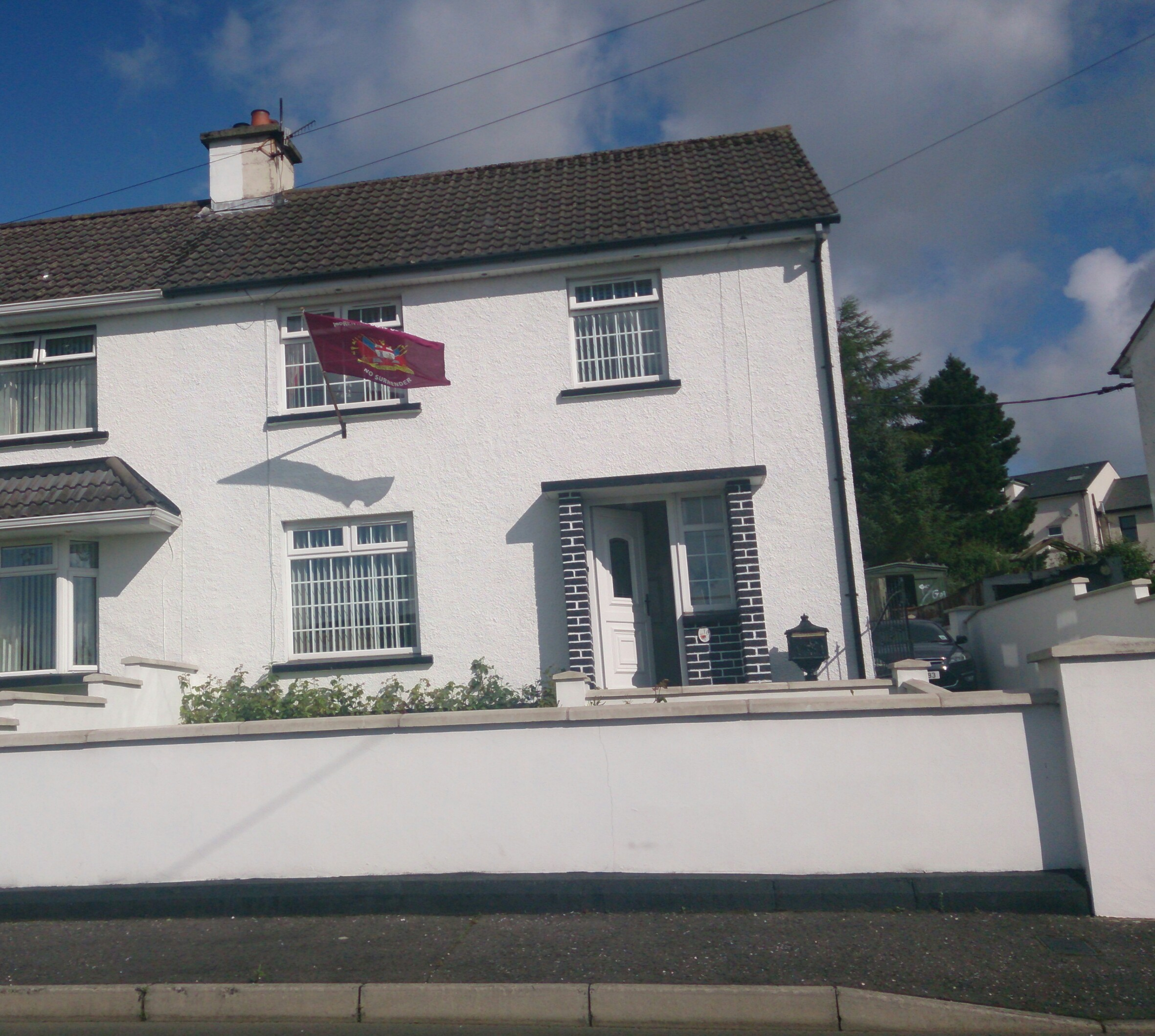
A house in Claudy flying an Apprentice Boys of Derry flag.

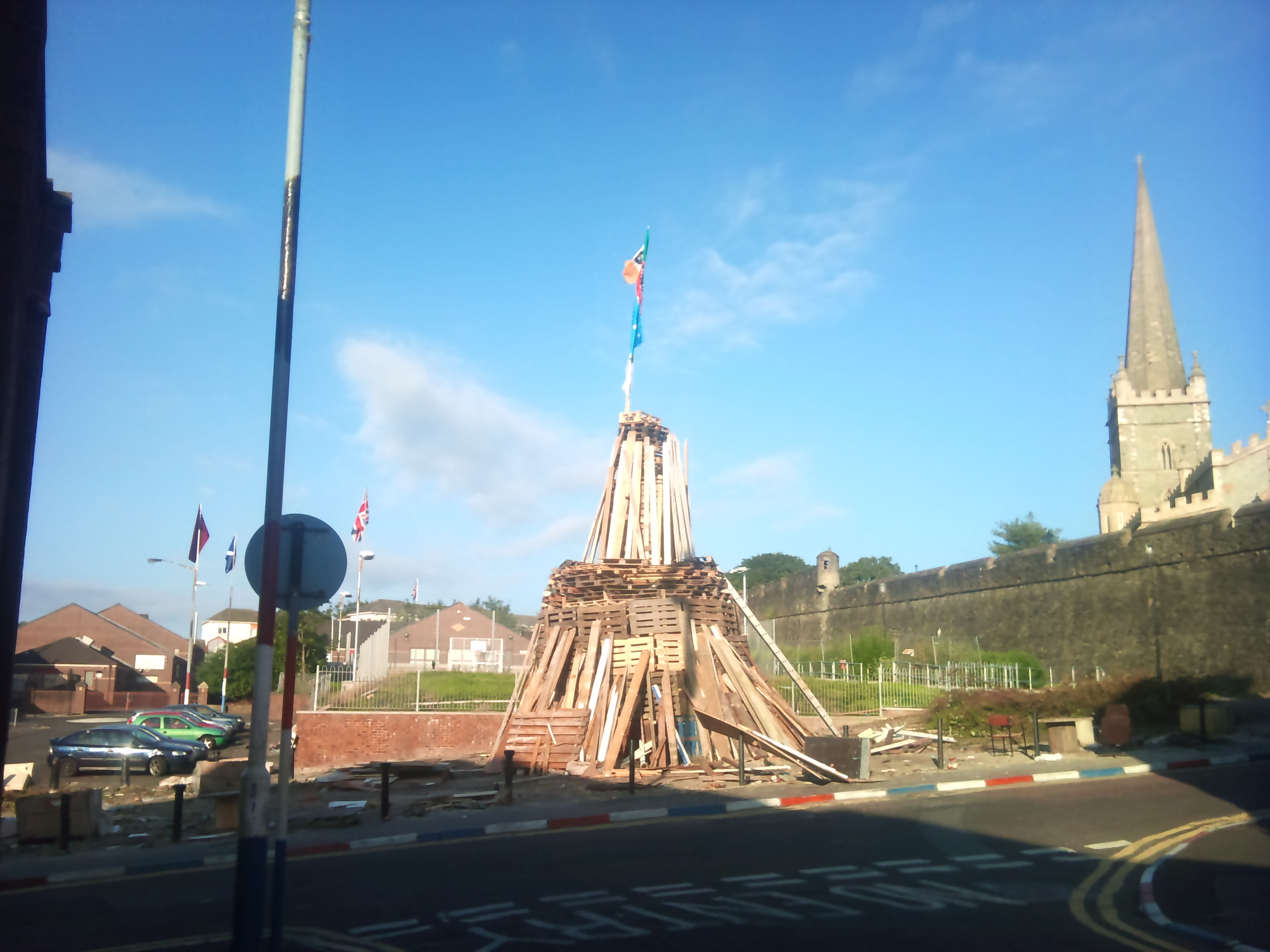
Bonfire in Derry's Fountain estate for the Relief of Derry celebrations

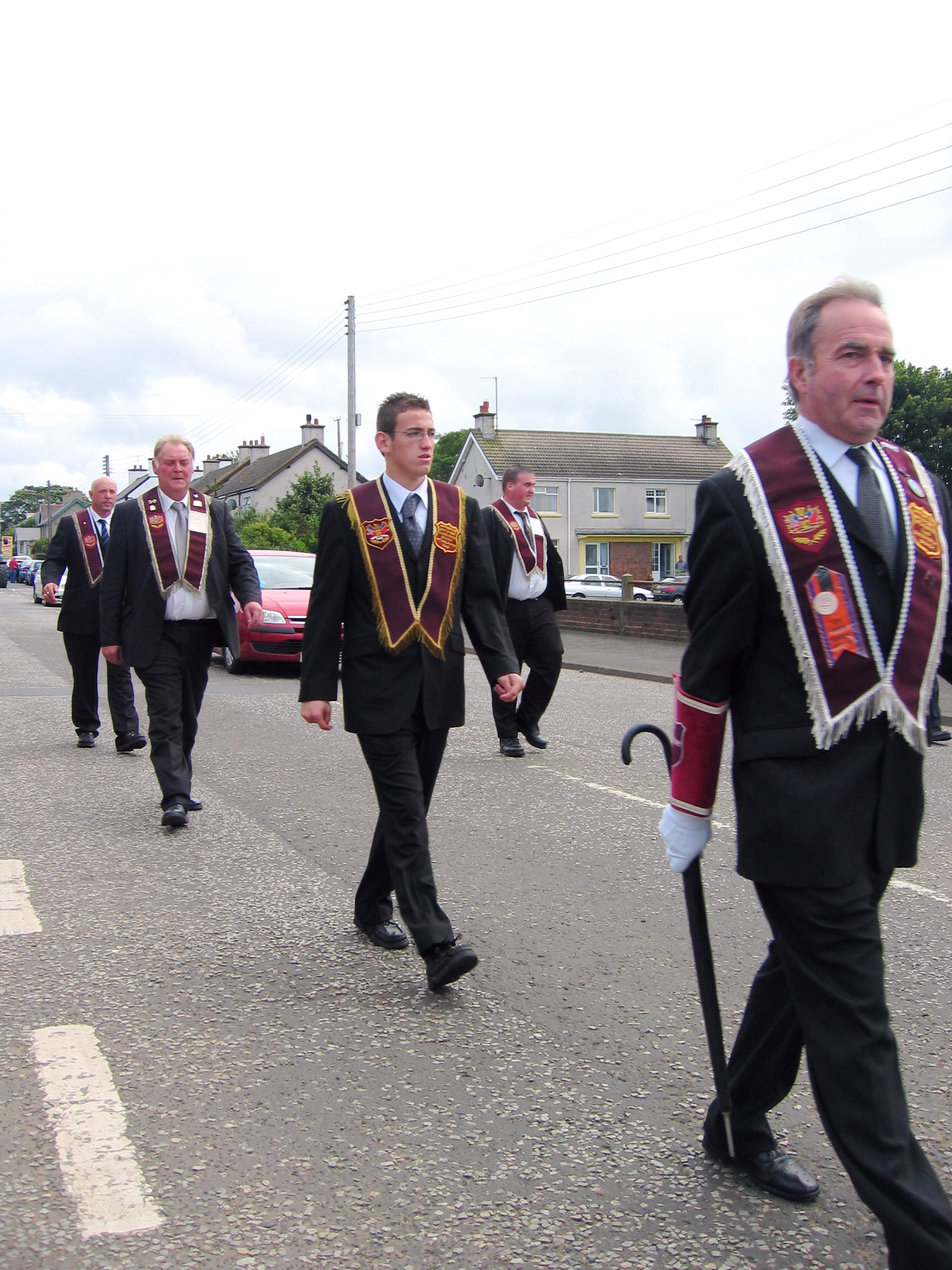
Apprentice Boys parade in Bushmills

The Apprentice Boys hold two main annual celebrations. These are the 'Shutting of the Gates' on the first Saturday in December, in memory of the action of the original apprentice boys; and the Relief of Derry on the second Saturday in August, in memory of the lifting of the siege. The Relief Parade in Derry is the largest of all the parades in Northern Ireland. In some areas of the city bonfires similar to those held on 11 July are erected and burned on the Eleventh Night. In recent years, it has transformed into the week-long Maiden City Festival in August and is accompanied by a series of diverse cultural events. These include bluegrass music festivals, Irish and Ulster Scots music and tuition, arts exhibitions and events staged by other local minority communities such as the Chinese and Polish communities. During the December celebrations it is traditional to burn or hang an effigy of Robert Lundy. Before the Troubles the effigy was often hung from, and then burnt in front of, the pillar commemorating George Walker.

The third biggest Apprentice Boys parade in addition to the Derry commemorations, the Apprentice Boys hold a major annual parade on Easter Monday. Dating back to the 1930s, this demonstration originated as a loyalist counter-event to the annual Republican commemorations of the 1916 Easter Rising. Unlike the December and August events, which are permanently anchored to the historic city walls of Derry, the Easter Monday parade rotates its host location each year across various towns and cities in Northern Ireland, such as Ballymoney, Lisburn, and Belfast. It serves as the traditional opening demonstration of the Protestant "marching season".

In an effort to build peace initiatives, they staged an event, the "Derry Maiden Festival", in conjunction with the Sligo Wild Geese in Derry city.

According to the Parades Commission, the Apprentice Boys held 231 parades in Northern Ireland in 2007. Of these, 116 were Relief of Derry parades and 115 were Closing of the Gates parades. The main December parade in Derry was expected to include 1500 marchers and 28 bands, while the main August parade was estimated at 10,000 marchers and 127 bands. In 2009/2010 32 marches took place in Glasgow, Scotland.

== History of the associated clubs of the Apprentice Boys of Derry ==
The first celebrations of the relief of Derry took place on Sunday 28 July 1689, when the starving citizens crowded the walls to welcome the relief ships. The first organised celebrations took place on Sunday 8 August 1689 when a thanksgiving service was held in St Columb's Cathedral. Subsequent celebrations have followed that precedent.

On 1 August 1714, ex-governor and siege hero Colonel Mitchelburne hoisted the Crimson Flag on the cathedral steeple and formed the first club known as the Apprentice Boys. The formal arrangements for the August and December commemorations were organised by the military garrison based in Derry.

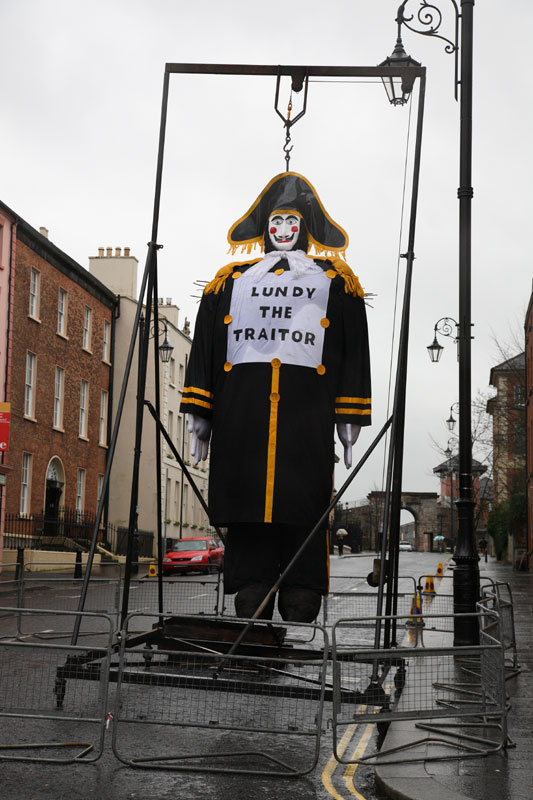
Effigy of Lundy the Traitor

In the late eighteenth century, Roman Catholic clergy joined in the prayer services offered on the walls of Derry, and in the early nineteenth century Catholics joined the celebrations with their Protestant fellow-citizens. However, the British government's Londonderry Riot Inquiry of 1869 found that "the character of the demonstrations (by the Apprentice Boys) has certainly undergone a change, and, among the Catholic lower classes at least, they are now regarded with the most hostile feelings". The inquiry recommended that both Apprentice Boys parades be banned. For similar reasons they also recommended the banning of Orange Order parades.

The Apprentice Boys role in the celebrations became more important in the early nineteenth century which saw the establishment of the Apprentice Boys of Derry Club in 1814 and the No Surrender Club in 1824. New clubs were formed over the following years, leading to eight parent clubs: Apprentice Boys; Walker; Mitchelburne; No Surrender; Browning; Baker; Campsie; and Murray. In December 1861 the various clubs agreed to associate together under a governing body known as the General Committee. This remains the governing body of the association, each of the eight clubs sending an equal number of representatives, together with delegates of various amalgamated committees around the UK.

In 1865, the local Conservative MP, Lord Claud Hamilton, won control of the Apprentice Boys and rallied the organisation against the campaign to disestablish the Anglican Church of Ireland, much to the dismay of many Presbyterian members (see also Irish Church Act 1869).

The celebrations continued in the usual form with the firing of the siege cannons (today a small replica is used), the ringing of the cathedral bells, the hoisting of the Crimson Flags and the laying of wreaths in memory of those who sacrificed their lives. In December they continue with the burning of an effigy of Robert Lundy (the Governor of Derry who had wished to negotiate with King James during the siege) and the service of thanksgiving in St Columb's Cathedral.

In 1969, the Apprentice Boys' parade around the walls of Derry sparked three days of intensive rioting in the city, known as the Battle of the Bogside. The disturbances are regarded by some as the start of the Troubles.

The George pillar, on the city's walls overlooking the Irish nationalist Bogside area, was blown up by the IRA in 1973. Walker Memorial Plinth remains at the Royal Bastion overlooking the Bogside, it has been restored as a historical feature of the Derrys Walls walk.

In 1986, the banning of an Apprentice Boys parade in Portadown led to rioting between supporters and the Royal Ulster Constabulary. During these disturbances Keith White became the first Protestant to be killed by a plastic bullet in the Troubles.

In 1990, the organisation decided to apply for funding from the newly established International Fund for Ireland, which led to protests by Ulster loyalists at its August parade. Ian Paisley addressed a rally at the courthouse where he told the crowd that the proposed grant was "a bribe to get Protestant people involved in the Anglo-Irish Agreement."

== Walker's Pillar ==
Plans for the 81-foot (25 m) high Walker Memorial Pillar were completed in 1826. After the completion of the pillar it played a central role in the celebrations. In 1832 the first occasion of the burning of the effigy of Colonel Lundy occurred, the Scottish Protestant governor during the early part of the siege. The pillar was destroyed by an IRA bomb in 1973. The memorial plinth was restored for the three hundredth anniversary of the siege. The Apprentice Boys placed the retrieved statue in a newly constructed memorial garden beside the Apprentice Boys Memorial Hall.

== Apprentice Boys Memorial Hall ==
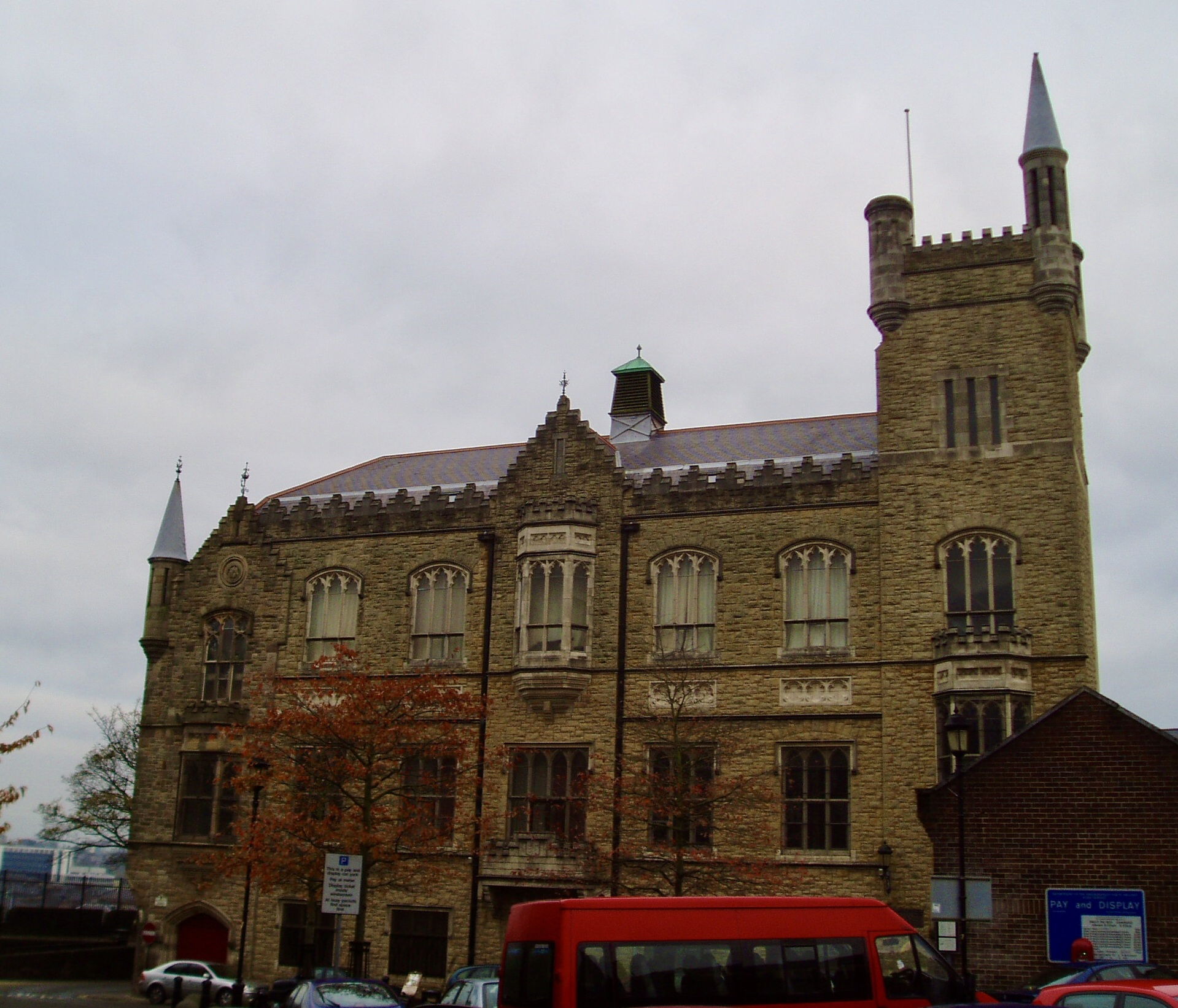
Memorial Hall on Society Street

The hall was opened in 1877, dedicated to the memory of the thirteen apprentice boys who closed the city gates in 1688. In 1937 the hall was extended along Society Street. The extension is dedicated to the memory of those who died in the Great War of 1914–1918. The hall is an architecturally important building within the walled city.

It now houses the headquarters of the association, with its office and debating chamber. All new members are initiated in the hall. Other organisations such as the Orange Order and Royal Black Preceptory have separate accommodations in the hall. It also houses a social club and a museum. The hall is usually open to the public during the summer months, July to September. It has received in 2012 funding from the European Union to create a new visitors centre.

== Membership ==
Members can only be initiated within the city walls. The wearing of crimson collarettes by members recalls the crimson flag flown from the cathedral during the siege. Membership is limited to Protestant men.

== Branches outside of Northern Ireland ==
=== Australia ===
The Apprentice Boys of Derry established their first official branch club in Australia in June 2019, and is chartered under the Murray Club. The first meeting took place held in Burwood, Sydney, bringing together members from New South Wales, Queensland, Victoria, and South Australia. Due to the lockdown restrictions as a result of the COVID-19 pandemic, members used Zoom to hold Officer meetings whilst being unable to attend the Apprentice Boys Memorial Hall.

=== Canada ===
The No Surrender Club Ottawa Branch is located in Eastern Ontario, this branch serves members throughout the Ottawa and St. Lawrence River Valleys.

The Toronto Murray Club is headquartered on Kennedy Road, Toronto, Ontario and was inaugurated in August 1960.

=== England ===
The English Amalgamated Committee was formally chartered on 9 April 1988, at Orange Street Church in London to coordinate and represent all Apprentice Boys clubs across England. There are over a dozen Apprentice Boys branches in England, in locations such as Merseyside, Greater Manchester, Tyneside, West Midlands and London. Parades, which include marching bands, take place in cities such as Manchester, Liverpool, Southport and Newcastle.

=== Republic of Ireland ===
The Dublin Apprentice Boys of Derry Society was formed in December 1813 at Morrison’s Hotel on Dawson Street, Dublin, a year before the Apprentice Boys of Derry Club was established. Notable members included Sir Edward Carson, Dr. Thomas John Barnardo, Sir William Verner, 1st Baronet and Lieutenant-General Henry George Hart.

In Donegal, there are several Apprentice Boys branches, including Donegal Murray Club, founded in 1936.

A major annual demonstration takes place in August in east Donegal, in the town of Raphoe.

=== Scotland ===
Scottish Amalgamated Committee was formed in 1946 to represent and oversee the 54 Apprentice Boys branches in Scotland.

Parades frequently take place throughout Scotland, and are accompanied by marching bands. The biggest parade is known as the Scottish Amalgamated Committee Annual Rally and Relief of Derry celebrations. In May and June 2026, these demonstrations took place in Fife and Ardrossan respectively. Other commemoration parades include the Battle of the Somme and Passchendaele parade.

== See also ==
- Orange Institution
- Imperial Orange Council
- Orange Heritage Week
- Royal Black Institution
- Royal Arch Purple
- Independent Loyal Orange Institution
- Grand Orange Lodge of Ireland
- Black Saturday demonstrations
- Banners in Northern Ireland
- Parades in Northern Ireland
