= Maiden City Festival =

The Maiden City Festival (Ulster-Scots: tha Maiden Citie Blythe-Tid) takes place in Derry, Northern Ireland in the second week in August each year. In 2008 the Festival was described as a "diverse, varied programme of events that underscores the organisers' desire to provide something for everyone", as well as a "showcase for Protestant tolerance and openness". Events included Bluegrass on the Walls, Children's Heritage Visual Art Workshops, drumming events, including some with members of the north west's African community, music of all kinds at the Verbal Arts Centre, Foyle Ulster Scots Highland Gathering, firework display, the fifth Annual Scottish Dance Competition, historical walks and talks, with the finale being the Relief of Derry Pageant (the Apprentice Boys of Derry 319th Relief of Derry Celebrations) on 9 August 2008. The Festival commemorates the actions of Protestant Apprentice Boys who shut the city gates against the forces of the Catholic King James in December 1688. King James laid siege to the city from December to August 1689 until the Protestant forces of William of Orange relieved the city.

Festival co-ordinator Billy Moore described the Festival (in 2008) as "the way in which the Protestant community of Derry, a minority community, is able to make a contribution to the life of the city and to the diversity of expression of culture. From the outset we have themed the Maiden City Festival as a showcase for the Protestant culture of tolerance and openness, and a means of showcasing the heritage that is entrusted to the Apprentice Boys of Derry".

== Funding ==
The festival had begun in a small way in 1998 but had been interrupted in 2006 and 2007, due to funding and organisational issues. Billy Moore, of the Apprentice Boys, was able to confirm the return of the Festival in 2008 thanks to funding from the Irish Government's Department of Foreign Affairs, as well as from Derry City Council and the Department of Culture, Arts and Leisure. The Department of Foreign Affairs was the largest sponsor of the event, which costs approximately £50,000 to run, paying £27,000 towards the costs. Brochures for the festival, featured the logo of sponsors, including "Department of Foreign Affairs, An Roinn Gothic Eachtracha".

Northern Ireland Government Departments funded the Festival to the tune of £100,000 in 2001–02, £155,000 in 2002–03 and £100,800 in 2003–04. This included funding in 2003-04 offered by Londonderry Regeneration Initiative for the post of a Development Worker and associated advertising and recruitment costs. In addition, the Ulster-Scots Agency made available £30,000 in 2001–02, £30,000 in 2002–03, £30,000 in 2003–04 and £30,000 in 2004–05, and the Arts Council of Northern Ireland provided £50,000 of National Lottery funding in 2002–03.
