= John Mitchelburne =

English soldier and playwright

Colonel John Mitchelburne (2 January 1648 – 1 October 1721) was an English soldier and playwright. He rose to prominence during the Williamite War in Ireland when he commanded the defenders of Derry.

== Early life and career ==
Mitchelburne was born in Sussex, the only son of Abraham Mitchelburne and Penelope Wheeler. At some point prior to 1664 his father moved the family to County Wicklow. During the 1660s and 1670s, Mitchelburne served as a soldier in The Lord General's Regiment of Foot Guards, seeing action in France and Flanders during the Franco-Dutch War. He purchased a commission in 1678, but returned to England in 1679 after the Treaties of Nijmegen. He was posted to English Tangier in 1680 before becoming a lieutenant in the regiment of William Stewart, 1st Viscount Mountjoy based in Dublin. Following the Glorious Revolution, he left Mountjoy's regiment, which had remained loyal to James II, and joined a Protestant militia in Derry shortly before the siege of the city began in April 1689.

== War in Ireland ==
During the Siege of Derry, Mitchelburne was appointed colonel by the joint governors, George Walker and Henry Baker, and became the most senior Williamite army officer in the city. After Baker's death, Mitchelburne became Governor of Londonderry and took over the defence of the city. He supervised the construction of new fortifications, and in July erected a gallows on the battlements, threatening to hang prisoners in response to the Jacobite tactic of driving Protestant refugees up to the city walls. While orchestrating the defences, he also formulated plans for the rapid evacuation of the city's occupants to Enniskillen.

Following the lifting of the siege in August 1689, Mitchelburne was retained as governor and he was elected an alderman of the city for life. He was directed to capture of Sligo from the Jacobites in July 1691, but command of the attacking Williamite force was soon passed on to Arthur Forbes, 1st Earl of Granard. He was briefly made governor of Sligo after Granard secured the town, but within a month was recalled to Dublin to face charges of corruption, though these were later dismissed.

== Later life ==
Mitchelburne was deeply indebted by the end of the war and petitioned the English government for compensation for him and his soldiers. In 1705 he wrote and privately published a play, Ireland preserv'd, which sought to justify his own conduct in the siege. The play was a modest success, and three London editions were printed by 1718. He was briefly imprisoned in London in 1709 for debt and subsequently returned to live in Derry. On 1 August 1714, he hoisted a crimson flag on the steeple of St Columb's Cathedral to mark the anniversary of the relief of the city. In 1718, Mitchelburne was involved in the foundation of the original Apprentice Boys of Derry club. He died in Derry on 1 October 1721, leaving provisions in his will for an impressive funeral, numerous philanthropic bequests, and £50 to maintain the flag over the cathedral.

== Legacy ==
Mitchelburne's actions in the defence of Derry continue to be commemorated and celebrated by the Apprentice Boys of Derry both in the City and throughout the UK. The Mitchelburne Club was established in the city on 18 July 1775.

Military offices
Preceded by George Walker; Henry Baker	Governor of Londonderry; 1689–1691	Succeeded by Matthew Bridges
