= Henry Baker (soldier) =

Anglo-Irish soldier (17th century)

Governor of Londonderry
- In office 1688–1689 Serving with Sir George Walker
- Preceded by: Robert Lundy
- Succeeded by: John Mitchelburne

Personal details
- Born: 1640
- Died: 30 June 1689 (aged 48–49); Derry, Ireland
- Resting place: St Columb's Cathedral

Military service
- Branch/service: English Army; Irish Army
- Rank: Colonel
- Unit: Tangier Garrison (English Army)
- Battles/wars: Williamite War in Ireland: Break of Dromore; Siege of Derry

Colonel Henry Baker (c. 1640–30 June 1689) was an Anglo-Irish soldier, noted for his time as Governor of Londonderry. He oversaw the successful defence of the city during the Siege of Derry in 1689, but died of illness before Derry was relieved.

Baker was a professional, career soldier. He served as part of the Tangier Garrison, something he had in common with other leading figures of the Siege of Derry such as Robert Lundy, Percy Kirke and John Mitchelburne.

On being dismissed during the administration of the earl of Tyrconnell, he returned to his farm outside Blackrock, County Louth.

Following the Irish Protestant rebellion against James II in 1689–91, Baker swore allegiance to William III and joined a newly raised regiment in Eastern Ulster where he was promoted to the rank of Major. He was present during a failed attack on Carrickfergus in February, then at the Break of Dromore in March when an Irish Army force under Richard Hamilton routed Arthur Rawdon's Protestant troops, and also at the unsuccessful defence of the Bann in April.

With many other survivors of Dromore, Baker headed west towards Derry, one of the few remaining centres to hold out against James II. The Protestants suffered another defeat at the Battle of Cladyford, and the Jacobite forces approached Derry to besiege it. After the previous Governor Robert Lundy had resigned his post and left the city, Baker was offered the governorship. He agreed to take command, provided that the Reverend George Walker was appointed his deputy to oversee the city's stores. Baker was also promoted to Colonel and commander of all the forces in Derry.

Under Baker's leadership the city's defenders remained active, sallying out a number of times against the besiegers. After he fell ill with a fever and exhaustion, he appointed Mitchelburne to replace him, who was formally elected governor after Baker's death on 30 June 1689. Baker was buried in St Columb's Cathedral in Derry.

== Bibliography ==
- Childs, John. The Williamite War in Ireland, 1688-1691. Continuum, 2007.
