= George Walker (soldier) =

English Williamite soldier and Anglican clergyman (d. 1690)

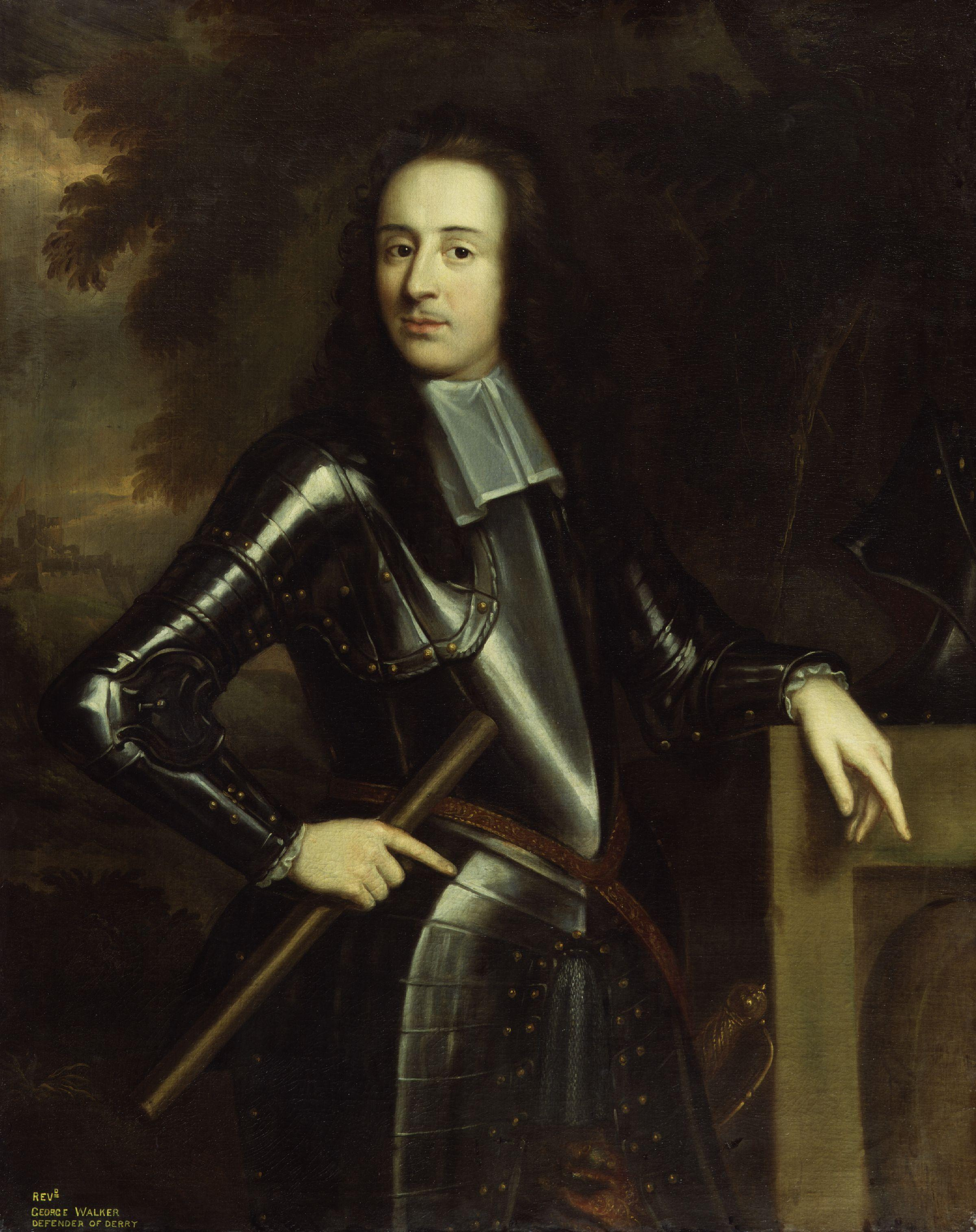
Portrait of George Walker by an unknown artist

George Walker (c.1645 – 1 July 1690 Old Style) was an English soldier and Anglican priest. He was joint Governor of Derry during the Siege in 1689. He was killed at the Battle of the Boyne while going to the aid of the wounded Duke of Schomberg.

== Family ==
George Walker II (1645–1690) was born in Wighill, now in North Yorkshire, England, the son of George Walker (1600–1677), rector of Kilmore, County Armagh and Chancellor of Armagh, and Ursula Stanhope (1617–1654), daughter of Sir John Stanhope of Melwood. Walker was educated at Glasgow University. He married Isabella Barclay (1644–1705), by whom he had nine sons and daughters: George Walker III 1669–1699; James 1670–1700; John 1671–1726; Gervase 1672–1693; Robert 1674–1705; Thomas 1677–1712; Mary 1679; Charity 1681–1728; Elizabeth 1683.

== Early career ==
He became rector of the Parish of Donaghmore in 1674. He was also made rector of the Parishes of Lessan (or Lissan) and Desertlyn, in the Church of Ireland Diocese of Armagh.

== Siege of Derry ==
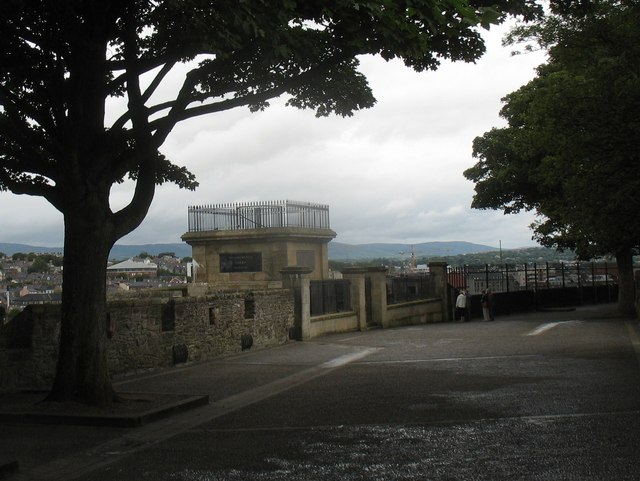
The Walker Plinth, on the Walls of Derry

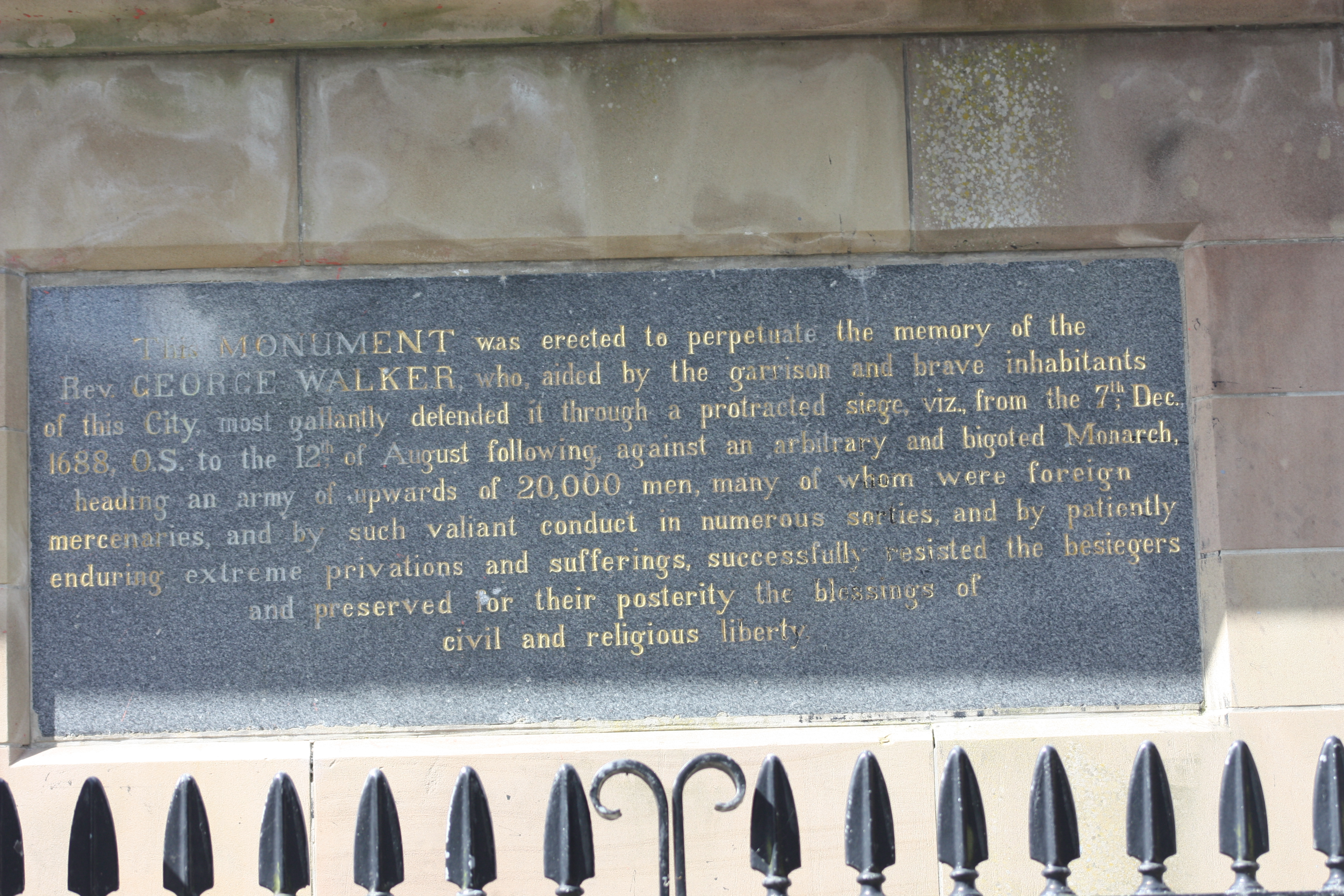
Inscription on the Walker Plinth

A Doctor of Divinity, Walker was joint Governor of Londonderry along with Henry Baker during the Siege of Derry in 1689, and received the thanks of the House of Commons for his work.

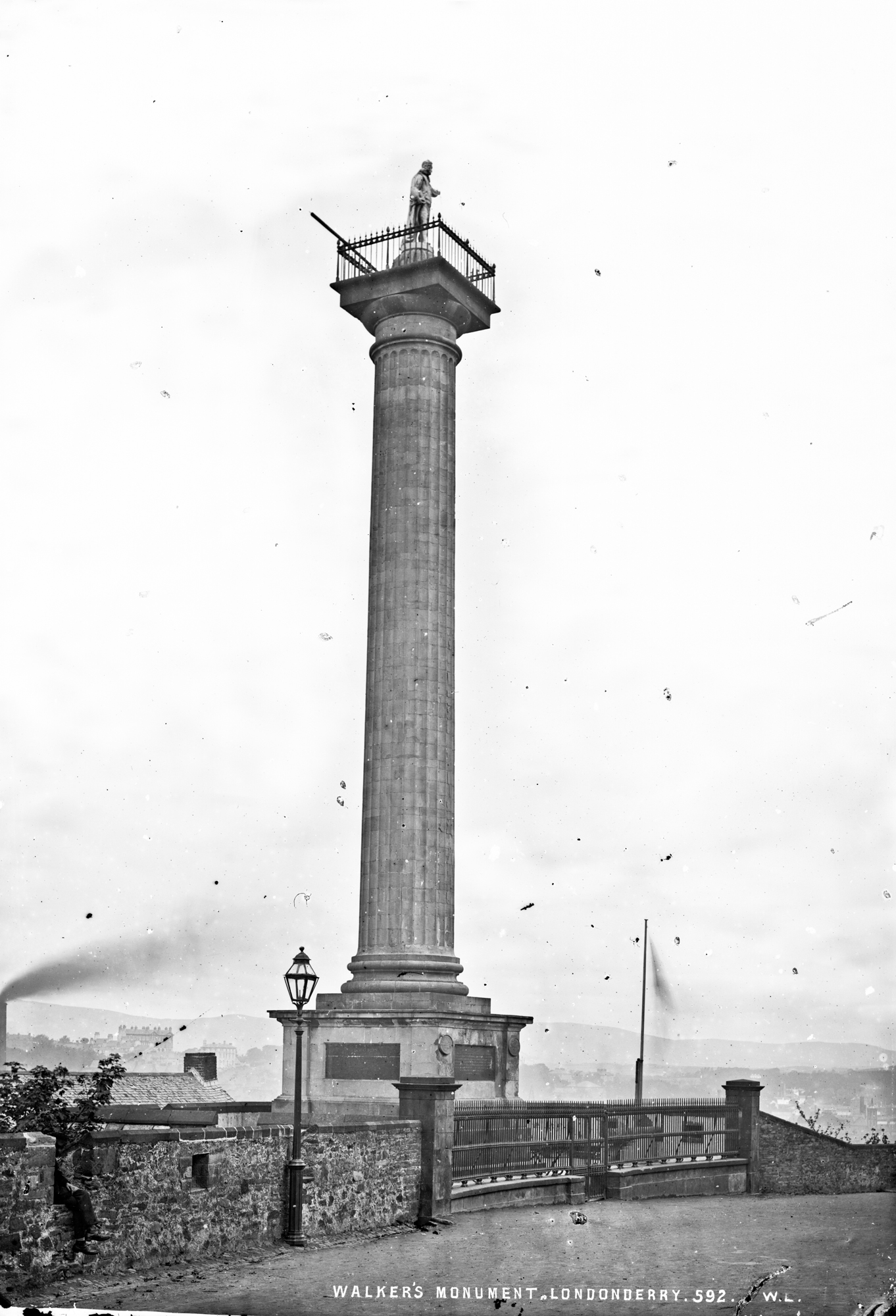
The former Walker's Monument, which stood from 1828 to 1973

He was killed at the Battle of the Boyne on 1 July 1690 (12 July New Style), whilst going to the aid of Frederick Schomberg, 1st Duke of Schomberg, Commander-in-Chief of all Williamite forces in Ireland, who was wounded during the crossing of the river in the early part of the battle. He was originally buried at the battlefield but at the insistence of his widow, his body was later exhumed and buried inside the church at Castlecaufield, County Tyrone. His body was later rediscovered and re-interred next to that of his wife but not before a cast was taken of his skull.

The Walker Plinth on the derry city walls which was completed in 1828, remains in his memory; although the column that stood on the plinth was destroyed in an IRA bomb attack in 1973.
