= Lord Grand Prior's Regiment =

- Active: 1689–1698; 1698–1715 (in French Royal Army)
- Country: Jacobites; France
- Role: Line infantry
- Size: (1690) 13 companies; 802 men
- Engagements: Williamite War in Ireland; The Boyne; Athlone; Aughrim; Nine Years' War; War of the Spanish Succession; Luzzara; Malplaquet; Oudenarde

Commanders
- Colonel of the Regiment: Henry Fitzjames
- Notable commanders: Robert Ramsay; Mark Talbot; Daniel O'Donnell

The Lord Grand Prior's Regiment, also known as Fitzjames' Regiment and as the Regiment of the Marine (Régiment de la Marine d'Angleterre), was an infantry regiment originally raised in Ireland to fight for the deposed monarch James II during his war against his successor, William of Orange. While technically classed as a regiment of marines for much of its existence, as James possessed no navy it generally fought as conventional infantry. Its colonel was James's illegitimate son Henry Fitzjames, Grand Prior of the Knights of Malta, although in practice field command was delegated to an experienced lieutenant-colonel.

Following Jacobite defeat in Ireland the regiment was reformed in France, seeing heavy fighting on the Continent as part of the Irish Brigade. In 1703 Nicholas Fitzgerald became colonel, and the regiment was designated the Régiment de Fitzgerald; it finally became the Régiment d'Odonnell under Daniel O'Donnell, before disbandment in 1715.

== History ==
=== Williamite War in Ireland ===
The Grand Prior's Regiment had its origin in the huge expansion of the Irish Army authorised by the Lord Deputy, the Earl of Tyrconnell, in the months following the deposition of James in the Glorious Revolution. In January 1689 warrants were issued for the recruitment of 40,000 levies, organised along standard regimental lines and almost entirely Catholic. By spring 1689, the army theoretically had around 36,000 men, although experienced officers remained in short supply.

The regiment is usually stated to have been raised in Ireland in early 1689, though one of its officers noted it was "one of the oldest in [Ireland], giving their precedence only to the Guards", raised in 1662. During the Williamite War it was initially commanded by a Scot, Brigadier Robert Ramsay, and served at Derry, where Ramsay was killed in early May leading an attack on Windmill Hill.

While most of the Irish Jacobite regiments were poorly documented, the movements of the Grand Prior's are known in some detail thanks to the diary of John Stevens, an English Catholic who fled to France after James's deposition. He was later sent to Ireland and in August 1689 was introduced to Fitzjames by Ignatius Usher, a captain in the Grand Prior's, which had returned from Derry and was now under Fitzjames' command. Fitzjames "immediately gave me the promise of a lieutenancy in his regiment, and a few days after delivered me the commission"; Stevens shortly afterwards joined the regiment at Drogheda.

At the Battle of the Boyne in July 1690, Stevens recorded that the appearance of the routed Jacobite cavalry caused the Grand Prior's to "[take] to their heels [...] I wondered what madness possessed our men to run so violently nobody pursuing them". The regiment gradually reassembled at Limerick; Stevens noted that without having even made contact with the enemy it had been reduced from 800 to 300 men, of whom only half had weapons, and its officers' baggage had been plundered twice by members of their own army. The Jacobites were nevertheless able to stabilise the situation and in September 1690 the regiment was particularly commended for its role in the successful Jacobite defence of Limerick, quartering in the town during the winter.

In May 1691, Fitzjames having left for France, the regiment was temporarily placed in the command of Brigadier Mark Talbot, Tyrconnell's illegitimate son. It was subsequently present at the 2nd Siege of Athlone, and fought in the heavy Jacobite defeat at Aughrim on 12 July. Following Aughrim, the remnants of the army retreated to Limerick; under the terms of the subsequent Treaty of Limerick, which gave Jacobite soldiers the choice of disbanding, entering French service, or joining William's army, 249 men of the regiment chose to leave for France. By 1 November the last Irish troops left Limerick for Cork, where transports would take them to France; it was estimated that 5,650 of the Irish had embarked, a large number having deserted en route to Cork.

=== In France ===
The Jacobite army was in an extremely poor state on arrival in France and was completely reorganised on terms largely dictated by the French, despite James's attempts to preserve its autonomy. Fitzjames' regiment was, however, reconstituted, although it is unclear how many of its personnel had served with it in Ireland other than some of its officers. Nicholas Fitzgerald, who had served with the regiment since its formation, was commissioned lieutenant-colonel. Following its reorganisation, the regiment saw "a good deal of fighting" on the Continent during the Nine Years' War, notably on campaign in Germany.

Under the terms of the 1697 Peace of Ryswick which concluded the war, the Grand Prior's was one of the few regiments to survive the disbandment of most of James's army in exile. Incorporated into the French Army's Irish Brigade, it was renamed the Regiment of Albemarle after another of Fitzjames' titles, and personnel from the disbanded Regiment of Dublin were incorporated in it.

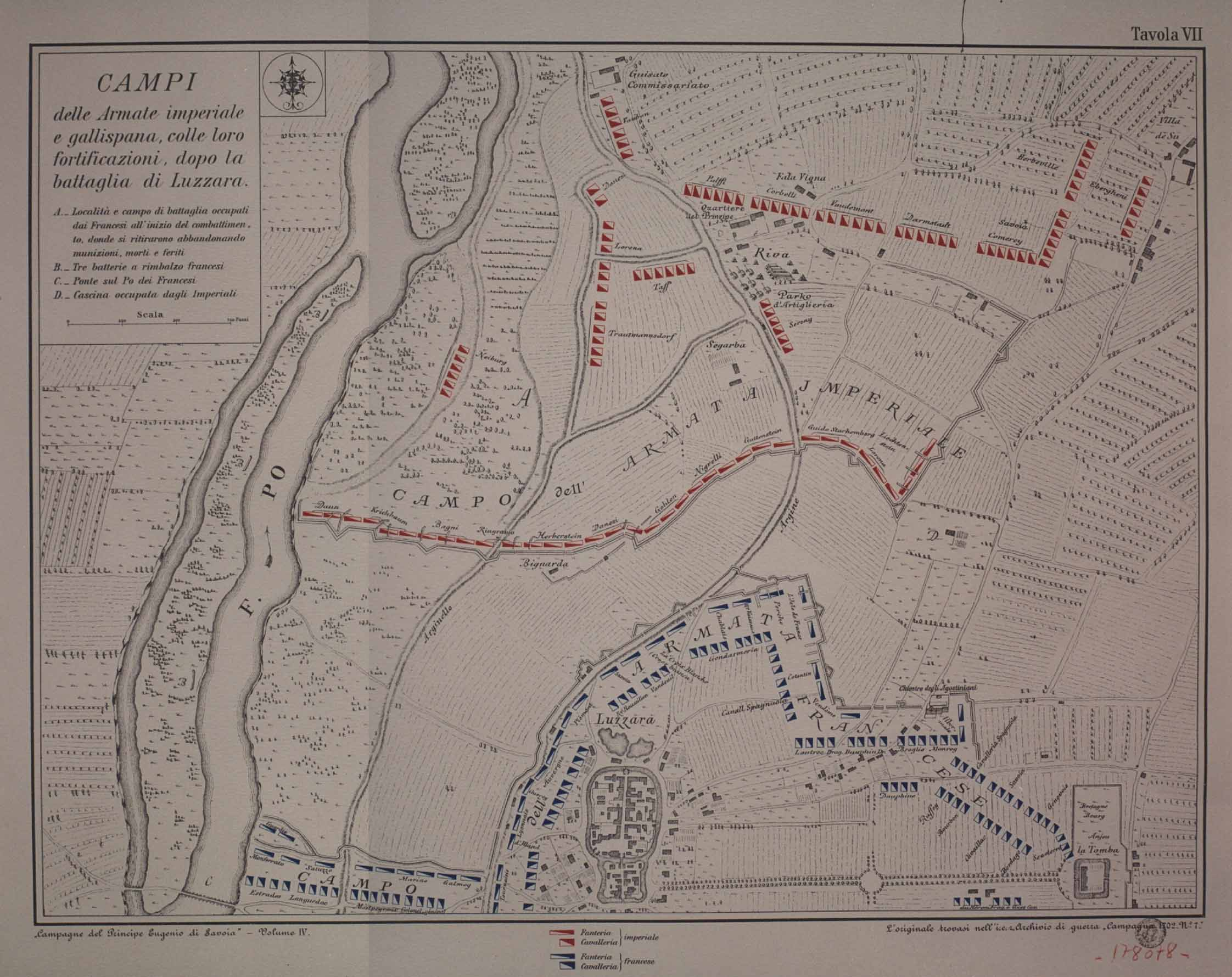
Luzzara, 1702; the regiment, marked "Albemarle", is shown towards the right of the French lines

In 1702, during the War of the Spanish Succession, the regiment was commended for its role at Luzzara, where it took extremely heavy casualties including many officers. Fitzjames died in December 1702 and the following year Fitzgerald was commissioned colonel, the regiment becoming the Regiment de Fitzgerald in line with usual French practice.

Fitzgerald was wounded and taken prisoner at Oudenarde in 1708, dying a few weeks later at Ghent. He was succeeded as colonel by Daniel O'Donnell, who had served with the regiment since 1692. Under O'Donnell the regiment participated in several of the war's major battles, including Malplaquet. It was eventually disbanded in 1715, with its remaining men being incorporated in the Irish Brigade regiments of Lee and O'Brien.

== Equipment and colours ==
Stevens recorded that while in Ireland the regiment were "clothed in red lined white, all but the drums, who are blue". He described the colours as bearing "a flaming city, and this motto, The fruits of Rebellion."

== Sources ==
- Bartlett, Thomas; Jeffery, Keith (1997). A Military History of Ireland. Cambridge UP.
- Childs, John (2007). The Williamite Wars in Ireland. Bloomsbury.
- Hayes-McCoy, G. A. (1942). "The Battle of Aughrim". Journal of the Galway Archaeological and Historical Society. 20 (1).
- Hayes-McCoy, G. A. (1979). A History of Irish Flags from Earliest Times. Academy Press.
- MacSwiney, Patrick (1930). "The Casualty List of the Infantry Regiment of Albemarle at the Battle of Luzzara, 15th August, 1702". Journal of the Royal Society of Antiquaries of Ireland. 20 (1).
- O'Callaghan, John (1870). History of the Irish Brigades in the service of France. Cameron & Ferguson.
- Rowlands, Guy (2001). An Army in Exile: Louis XIV and the Irish Forces of James II in France, 1691-1698. Royal Stuart Society.
- Stevens, John. The journal of John Stevens, containing a brief account of the war in Ireland, 1689–1691. University College, Cork.
