= William Dorrington =

English army officer

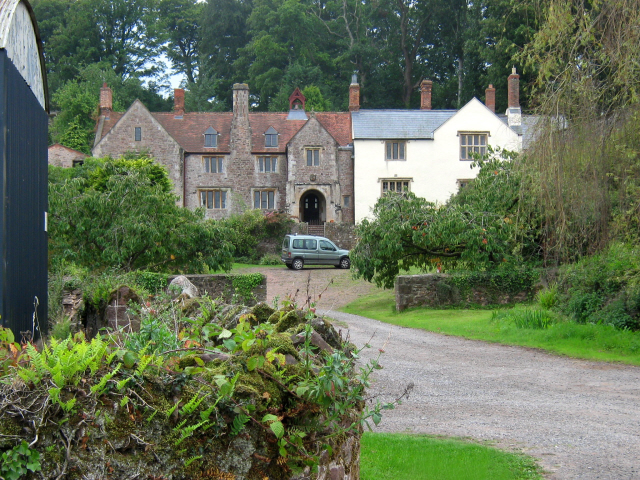
- Dodington Hall, Somerset, ancestral home of the Dodington or Dorrington family; heraldic evidence suggests William Dorrington was a member
- Born: c. 1644; England
- Died: 11 December 1718; Paris, France
- Military career
- Allegiance: England; Ireland; France
- Branch: Infantry
- Service years: c.1675-1718
- Rank: Lieutenant General
- Unit: Royal Irish Regiment of Foot Guards
- Conflicts: Williamite War in Ireland; Battle of the Boyne; Battle of Aughrim; War of the Spanish Succession: Battle of Blenheim; Battle of Ramillies; Battle of Malplaquet

William Dorrington (c. 1644–1718) was an English army officer. Contemporary sources often spell his surname as "Dorington", or "Dodington".

A Roman Catholic in a period when Catholics often faced restrictions on military service in England, he is best known for his service in the Jacobite cause of James II. Particularly associated with the Royal Irish Regiment of Foot Guards, he rose to the rank of Major General in James's Irish Army, fighting in the Williamite War.

Known as a capable soldier, in his later career he held a senior rank in the French army and received the Earldom of Macclesfield in the Jacobite Peerage. His regiment of Foot Guards later became the Regiment Roth of the Irish Brigade.

== Early career ==
Little is known of Dorrington's background, but his family arms of three bugle horns argent, as later recorded in France, were identical to those of the Dodington or Dorington families of Somerset and Mere, Wiltshire; the Somerset family had been notable Royalist supporters in the English Civil War.

From 1675 Dorrington gained experience as a Captain in a regiment of Anglo-Irish volunteers under the command of the Duke of Monmouth, serving with the French Army of Louis XIV in their war against the Dutch. From 1678 until the mid 1680s he served as an officer of the English Army in peacetime duties.

== Ireland ==
Dorrington was rapidly promoted after James's accession. Clarendon, the Lord Lieutenant of Ireland, noted that Dorrington was the "youngest major in the army"; by 1685 he had transferred to the Irish Army, when he was recorded as a major in Thomas Fairfax's regiment. In 1686 he became Lieutenant Colonel of the Royal Irish Regiment of Foot Guards, a prestige unit formally constituted in April 1662.

He was closely involved in the purge of Protestant officers that began shortly after 1685 and accelerated from 1687 under Clarendon's replacement the Earl of Tyrconnell. Dorrington was accused of going "too fast" in his haste to reform his regiment with fresh Catholic personnel; Clarendon remonstrated with him for beating up for recruits at St John's Well near Dublin, a favoured Catholic shrine.

Dorrington remained loyal to James during the Glorious Revolution of 1688, when a majority of senior officers in England defected to the invading force of William of Orange. The Irish Army under Tyrconnell prepared to hold Ireland for James, and were joined by Jacobite loyalists who had fled from England and Scotland.

Dorrington was formally appointed as colonel of the Foot Guards, succeeding the Protestant Duke of Ormonde, and eventually became one of six Major-Generals of the Jacobite army. His military reputation was high enough that when he was sent to the Siege of Derry, his arrival was "eagerly communicated" to the defenders "for the purpose of intimidation". He was wounded at Derry, though not seriously, and was present at the Battle of the Boyne the following year.

After the Jacobite victory at the Siege of Limerick he was appointed by Tyrconnell as Governor of the city. Success at Limerick led some Jacobites to believe the war could still be won and along with Patrick Sarsfield, Dorrington was one of the main figures in the "War Party", which opposed Tyrconnell's efforts to reach a peace settlement with William.

The 1691 campaign opened with a brief but bloody siege at Athlone; while the Williamite army took the town, the main Jacobite force fell back along the Galway road. The two armies met at Aughrim, County Galway on 12 July; Dorrington and John Hamilton commanded the two divisions of the Jacobite infantry. The Battle of Aughrim ended with the Jacobite forces shattered, Hamilton fatally wounded, and Dorrington captured. While the Williamite commander, Ginkel, had given word to Dorrington that the captives would be treated as prisoners of war, he and other general officers were instead taken to the Tower of London as prisoners of state.

The Earl of Ailesbury recorded that Dorrington, a "good friend", "was totally forgotten in France, and became most unhappy". In late 1693 he submitted a petition complaining about his treatment, having been denied rights usually given to prisoners of war; Lucas, the governor of the Tower, was later reprimanded for his "ill-usage" of Dorrington. In February 1694 he successfully escaped from the Tower in disguise aided by a group of Jacobite sympathising "gentlewomen". The London Gazette advertised a reward of £300 for his capture, describing him as a "a tall spare Man, aged near 50 or thereabouts, thin Visaged, having a Welt near the lower part of his Right Cheek by a Shot".

== Later career ==
On his return to France he resumed command of the Foot Guards, now serving in French exile under the terms of the Treaty of Limerick.

Dorrington subsequently served in Flanders during the War of the Grand Alliance; he was created brigadier by brevet on 28 April 1694. Following the Peace of Ryswick which ended the war, the Foot Guards were amalgamated into the Irish Brigade of the French Army as Dorrington's Regiment.

He was appointed Major General in 1702. During the War of the Spanish Succession he served under Villars in Germany, and was present at Blenheim in 1704. Promoted to Lieutenant General later the same year, he saw action at the Battle of Ramillies in 1706 and at Malplaquet in 1709. He accompanied James's son, James Frances Edward, to Scotland in both the failed 1708 landing attempt and the Jacobite rising of 1715.

In 1716 Dorrington was made Earl of Macclesfield in the Jacobite Peerage, a title that was not recognized in Britain. He died in Paris in 1718. Descendants of his nephew, Peter Dorrington, continued in France until well into the 19th century.

== Bibliography ==
- D'Alton, John. King James's Irish Army List. The Celtic Bookshop, 1997.
- Childs, John. The Army, James II and the Glorious Revolution. Manchester University Press, 1980.
- Childs, John. The Williamite Wars in Ireland. Bloomsbury Publishing, 2007.

Peerage of England
New title	— TITULAR — Earl of Macclesfield; Jacobite peerage 1716–1718	Unknown
