= Gerald Fennell =

Irish doctor and politician of the 17th century

Gerald Fennell was an Irish doctor and politician of the seventeenth century. He is notable for his leadership role in Confederate Ireland where he sat on the Supreme Council in Kilkenny. He is identified with the Moderate Faction of the Conderates, and strongly supported a peace agreement with the Irish government.

Fennell was a Roman Catholic from Munster of Old English descent. While not involved in the initial stages of the Irish Rebellion of 1641, Fennell supported the creation of the Irish Confederation which took over government of the rebel-controlled areas. The Confederation was supportive of Charles I, while pushing for greater rights for the Catholic Church in Ireland.

Before the Rebellion, Fennell had been physician to the Earl of Ormond. Ormond, a Protestant, became Commander of Irish Army and Viceroy. As a long-standing friend of Ormond, Fennell was able to act as a go-between during lengthy negotiations between the Irish Confederates and the Crown during the 1640s.

== Bibliography ==
- Kelly, James & Clark, Fiona. Ireland and Medicine in the Seventeenth and Eighteenth Centuries. Ashgate Publishing, 2013.
- O Siochru, Micheal. Confederate Ireland, 1642-1649. A Constitutional and Political Analysis. Four Courts Press, 1999.
