= Daniel O'Donnell (disambiguation) =

Daniel O'Donnell (born 1961) is an Irish singer.

Daniel, Danny, or Dan O'Donnell may also refer to:

- Daniel O'Donnell (Irish Brigade) (1666–1735), brigadier-general in the Irish Brigade in the French service
- Daniel J. O'Donnell (born 1960), American legislator from the state of New York
- Danny O'Donnell (footballer, born 1986), English footballer
- Danny O'Donnell (footballer, born 1939) (1939–2024), Scottish footballer
- D.O.D. (DJ), (Dan O'Donnell, born 1995), British DJ and record producer
