= Daniel O'Donnell (Irish Brigade) =

Irish army officer in French service (1666 – 1735)

Daniel O'Donnell (1666 – 1735) was a brigadier-general in the Irish Brigade in the French service. He belonged to the derbhfine of the last Chief of the Name of Clan O'Donnell and Lord of Tyrconnel.

== Biography ==
O'Donnell was a descendant of Hugh the Dark or Aedh Dubh, called "the Achilles of the Gaels of Erin", an elder brother of Manus O'Donnell lord of Tyrconnel. His father, Terence or Turlough O'Donnell, and his mother, Johanna, also an O'Donnell, were both of county Donegal.

O'Donnell was born in 1666, and was appointed a captain of foot in King James's army on 7 December 1688, and in 1689 was acting colonel. Passing into the service of France after the treaty of Limerick, he could only obtain the rank of captain in the marine regiment of the Irish Brigade. This regiment had been raised in Ireland for King James in 1689, and was commanded by Henry FitzJames, grand prior of England, a natural son of the king and brother of the Duke of Berwick. O'Donnell, whose commission was dated 4 February 1692, served with this regiment on the coast of Normandy during the projected invasion of England, which was averted by Edward Russell's victory at the naval Battle of La Hogue, and afterwards in Germany in the campaigns of 1693–1695.

O'Donnell's regiment was reformed in that of Albemarle in 1698, and his commission as captain was redated on 27 April 1698. He served in Germany in 1701, and afterwards in five campaigns in Italy, where he was present at Luzzara, the reduction of Borgoforte, Nago, Arco, Vercelli, Ivrea, Verrua, and Chivasso, and the Battle of Cassano, and was lieutenant-colonel of the regiment at the siege and Battle of Turin.

Transferred to the Low Countries in 1707, he fought against the Duke of Marlborough at the Battle of Oudenarde in 1708, succeeded Nicholas FitzGerald as colonel of a regiment on 7 August 1708, and commanded the regiment of O'Donnell of the brigade in the campaigns of 1709–1712, including the Battle of Malplaquet and the defence of the Lines of Arleux, of Denain, Douai, Bouchain, and Quesnoy. He then served under Marshal Villars in Germany, at the sieges of Landau and Freiberg, and the forcing of General Vaubonne's entrenchments, which led to the peace of Rastatt between Germany and France in March 1714. In accordance with an order of 6 February 1715, the regiment of O'Donnell was reformed, one half being transferred to Colonel Francis Lee's regiment, the other half to that of Major-general Murrough O'Brien, to which O'Donnell was attached as a "reformed" or supplementary colonel. He became a brigadier-general on 1 February 1719, and retired to St. Germain-en-Laye, where he died without issue on 7 July 1735.

== Cathach of Columb-Cille ==
A jewelled casket containing a Latin psalter said to have been written by the hand of St. Columba, and known as the "Cathach of Columb-Cille", belonged to Brigadier O'Donnell, and was regarded by him, in accordance with its traditional history, as a talisman of victory if carried into battle by any of the Cinel Conaill. O'Donnell placed it in a silver case and deposited it for safety in a Belgian monastery. He left instructions by will that it was to be given up to whoever could prove himself chief of the O'Donnells. Through an Irish abbot it was restored to Sir Neale O'Donnell, 2nd Baronet, of Newport House, County Mayo, in 1802. His son, Sir Richard Annesley, entrusted the relic to the Royal Irish Academy, in whose custody it still remains.
