= Nicholas Armorer =

Sir Nicholas Armorer (c.1620–1686) was a Royalist army officer during the English Civil War. During the Interregnum he was an active Royalist conspirator who ran a spy network in England and helped to foment insurrection against the Commonwealth and the Protectorate. He took part in Booth's Rebellion in 1659 and was forced to flee back to the continent when the uprising failed.

After the restoration of the monarchy as a reward for his services to Charles II he was made appointed equerry in ordinary to the hunting stable. In 1662 he was given several parcels of land confiscated from members of the former regime, and was granted the monopoly on the import of horses for the king's use. In the same year he was also knighted.

Towards the end of the Civil War he had spent some time in Ireland, and after the Restoration he spent much of his time there, as he had been under the patronage of Duke of Ormond during his time in exile, and continued to do so under the Restoration: he was appointed a captain in the Irish Guards and lieutenant-governor of Fort Duncannon.
