= John Mulvany =

Irish-born American artist

- Born: 1839; Moynalty, Meath, Ireland
- Died: 1906 (aged 66–67); New York, New York, U.S.
- Resting place: Calvary Cemetery Queens, New York City

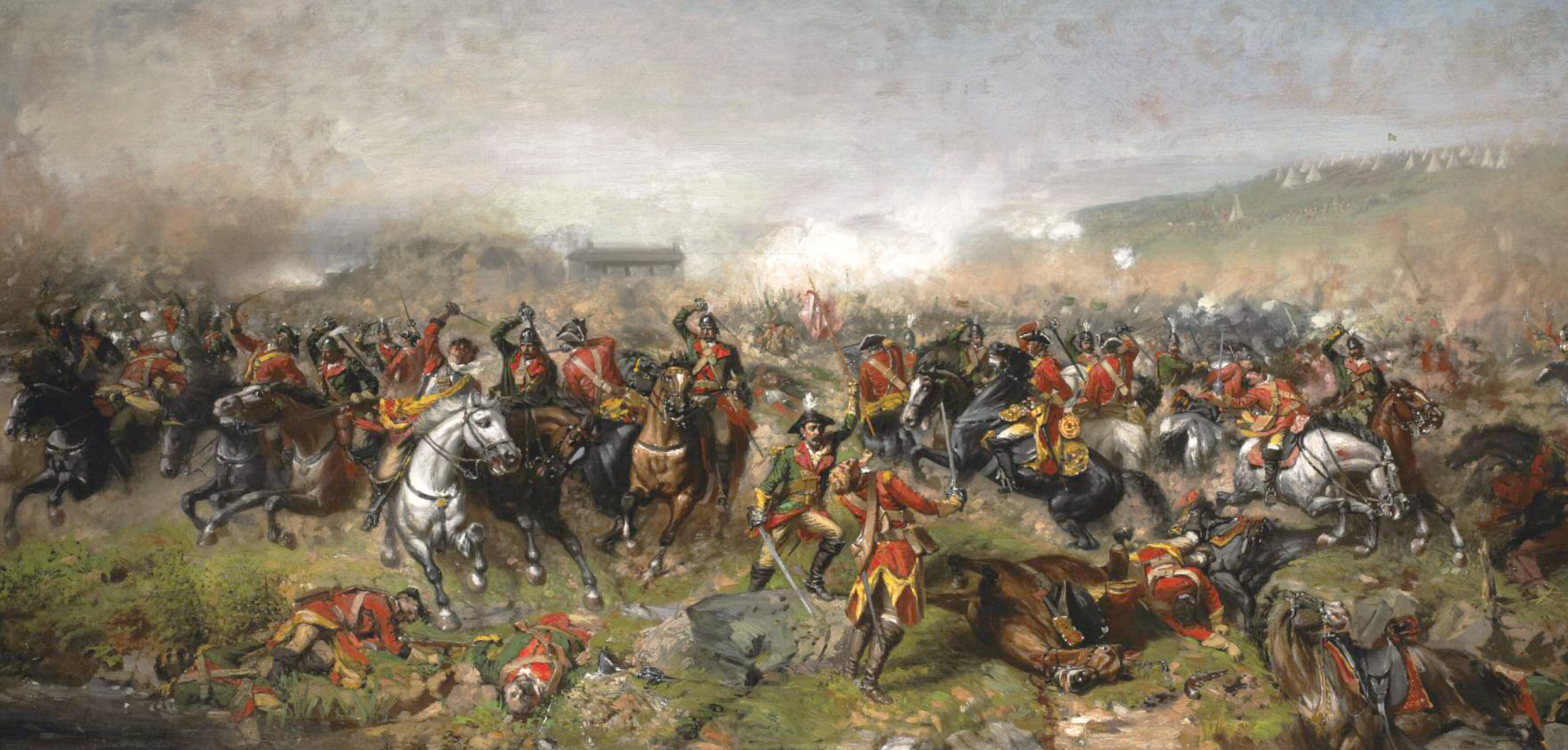
The Battle of Aughrim (1885)

John Mulvany (c. 1839–1906) was an Irish born American artist best known as an artist of the American West who painted the first large (11 ft x 21 ft) image of General Custer’s defeat by the Oglala Sioux Indians at Little Big Horn in 1876. Mulvany's painting Custer’s Last Rally, was finished in 1881. In Ireland, he is known for The Battle of Aughrim, painted in 1885 and exhibited in Dublin in 2010.

Mulvany also recorded the American Civil War on canvas as well as maintaining a career as a portrait painter throughout his life.

== Early life and training ==
Mulvany was born in Moynalty, Meath, Ireland c. 1844 to tenant farmers, Francis Lee and Thomas Mulvany. When he immigrated to New York City in 1851 as a stowaway at the age of 12, he was old enough to have witnessed and grasped the horrors of the Irish Famine. He worked as a tow boy on the Erie Canal and came to the attention of Professor Juan B. Wandesforde at the National Academy of Design in New York City. In 1859 Mulvany enrolled in classes there before going to Washington, D.C. to work for Mathew Brady by 1863.

Mulvany never served in the army but may have worked as a sketch artist for a Chicago newspaper. Mulvany's later Civil War paintings were praised for their realism - paintings such as Sheridan’s Ride at Winchester, 1896 McPherson and Revenge, 1889, Battle of Shiloh and The Death of General Mulligan.

== Munich training ==
After the Civil War, Mulvany worked for Samuel B. Fassett, a leading photographer in Chicago. He submitted paintings to exhibitions in New York, Chicago and Philadelphia. Mulvany found a patron in St. Louis, Samuel B. Coale, who provided terms for him to study in Europe where he enrolled in the Royal Academy of Fine Arts, Munich. studying with Alexander von Wagner, De Kaiser and Carl Theodor von Piloty, then with Jean-Léon Gérôme in Paris. He also spent time in Antwerp studying works by Rembrandt.

He was a classmate of Walter Shirlaw and Frank Duveneck. Mulvany won a medal for his efforts, and returned to Chicago in the fall of 1871 just before the devastating fire.

== Career beginnings ==
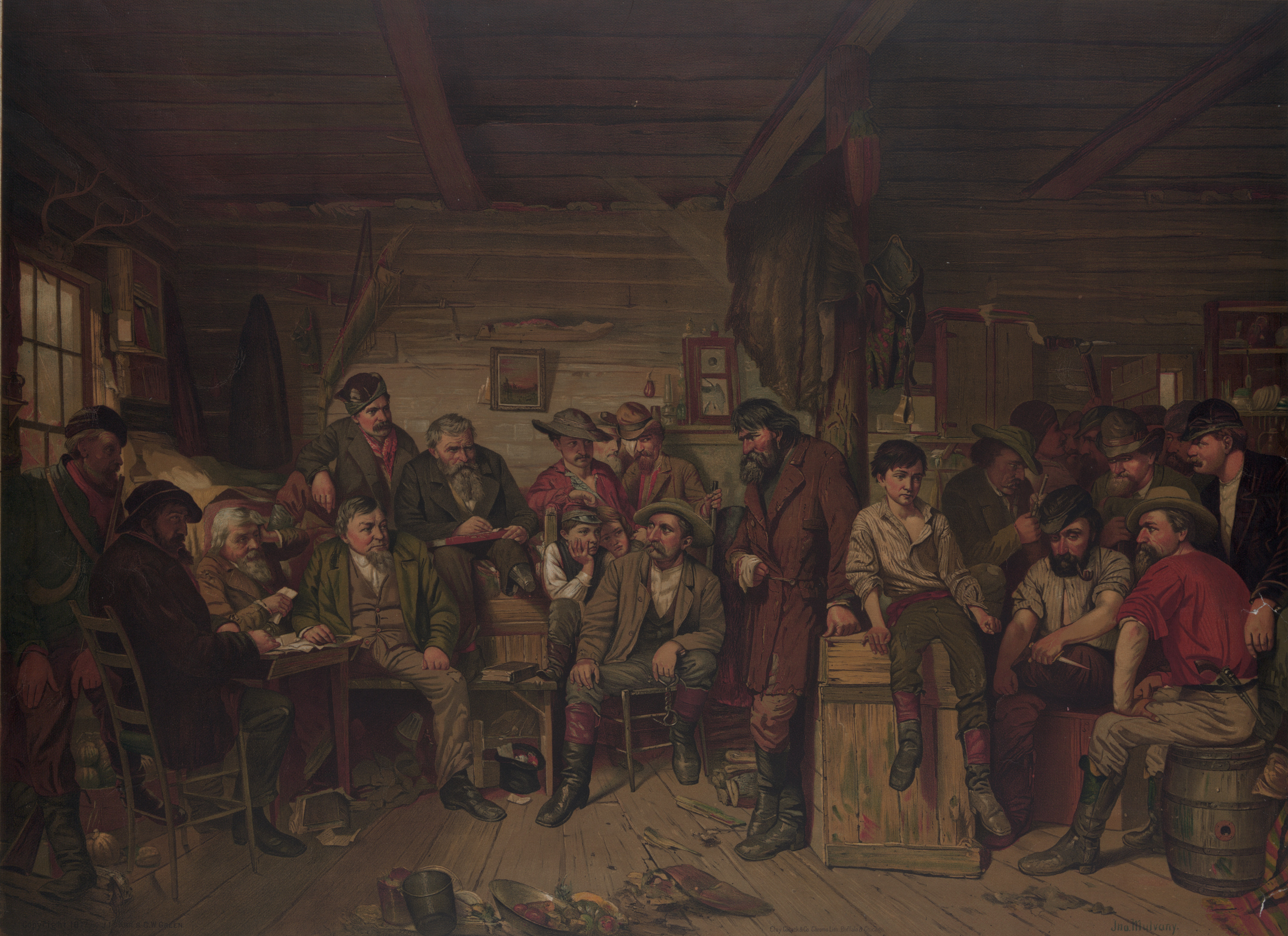
The trial of a horse thief

Over the next five years Mulvany worked in Eldon, Iowa; St Louis, Missouri; Denver, Colorado; and Louisville, Kentucky, painting portraits and western genre pictures. In 1876 he exhibited Preliminary Trial of a Horsethief in New York City. The painting, reportedly sold for $5,000, won him national recognition and a reputation as a Western painter. Other western-themed works include Lynch Law – Comrade’s Appeal 1877, Scouts of the Yellowstone, 1877 and Back to the Wigwam 1881.

The painting of Preliminary Trial of a Horsethief was painted near Oskaloosa, Iowa. The Magistrate in this trial, seated in the center of the picture, is John F. Cartwright (1827–1893), my Second Great Grandfather. The Des Moines Register published this picture in their Sunday edition in about 1954.

== "Custer's Last Rally" ==
In 1876 when news of General George Custer's fatal defeat by the Sioux Indians at the Battle of the Little Big Horn reached the East, Mulvany immediately recognized the significance of this event and headed west to Montana to capture it on canvas. Over the next four years, he made two trips to the battle site and set up a studio in Cincinnati, Salida, Denver and then in Kansas City., Mulvany's large masterpiece, the 11 ft x 20 ft Custer’s Last Rally, 1881, began its seventeen-year coast-to-coast tour of the country before H. J. Heinz took over ownership in 1898.

== "Aughrim" ==
Around 1882, Mulvany secured a commission from the Irish Club of Chicago to paint the Battle of Aughrim – a tragic loss for the Irish in 1691. John began preliminary sketches in Ireland in 1882 and finished the piece in 1885. This painting was presumed lost until it was offered for sale on eBay in 2010 by a dealer who thought it represented an American battle scene, purchased by an Irish art gallery, exhibited in Dublin and subsequently sold.

== Politics ==
Mulvany was a lifelong member of the Irish secret society, Clan na Gael, whose aim was Irish independence. He narrowly escaped imprisonment by the authorities while researching uniforms for his Aughrim painting at the Tower of London just days before it was bombed in the Fenian dynamite campaign in 1885. His involvement in internecine fighting within the Chicago branch in 1886 cost him the Aughrim commission and after his friend, Dr. Patrick Henry Cronin, was murdered in 1889 over financial irregularities with this same branch, Mulvany left Chicago for the west. He married Mrs. Ellen Welch in 1890. and was divorced two years later in CO. He also had a romantic involvement with Lucy Deere, whom he met c. 1880 and contacted before his death in 1906.

Mulvany painted in Oregon, San Francisco, Colorado and Kansas City before he finally headed East in 1896. Over his lifetime, he set up studios in 21 different cities, sketching, painting and moving on; often leaving finished works and at least one debt behind.

== Brooklyn, New York years ==
In 1897, at the age of 58, Mulvany finally settled in the Williamsburg area of Brooklyn, New York, where he remained the rest of his life with a studio at 133 Greenpoint Ave. He continued his artistic career painting six known major works, as well as a duplicate of Custer’s Last Rally, seeking exhibition opportunities, painting portraits, and even sketching up until two weeks before his death.

Mulvany died by drowning in early May 1906; the press declared it a suicide. He was 66 years old, suffering from throat cancer, a fatal disease at the time, vertigo and possible effects of alcoholism. He is buried in Calvary Cemetery, Queens, New York.

== Legacy ==
Mulvany's contributions are several. He not only influenced William Merritt Chase and Frederic Remington, he also brought an international perspective to American Western Art. In addition, his life reflects a broader Irish immigrant experience than typically recorded. Recent Irish scholarship has focused on Mulvany's accomplishments. Other noteworthy paintings include Love's Mirror and The Old Professor. Much of his work is unlocated.
