= Battle of Aughrim =

1691 battle of the Williamite War in Ireland

- Part of the Williamite War in Ireland and the Nine Years' War
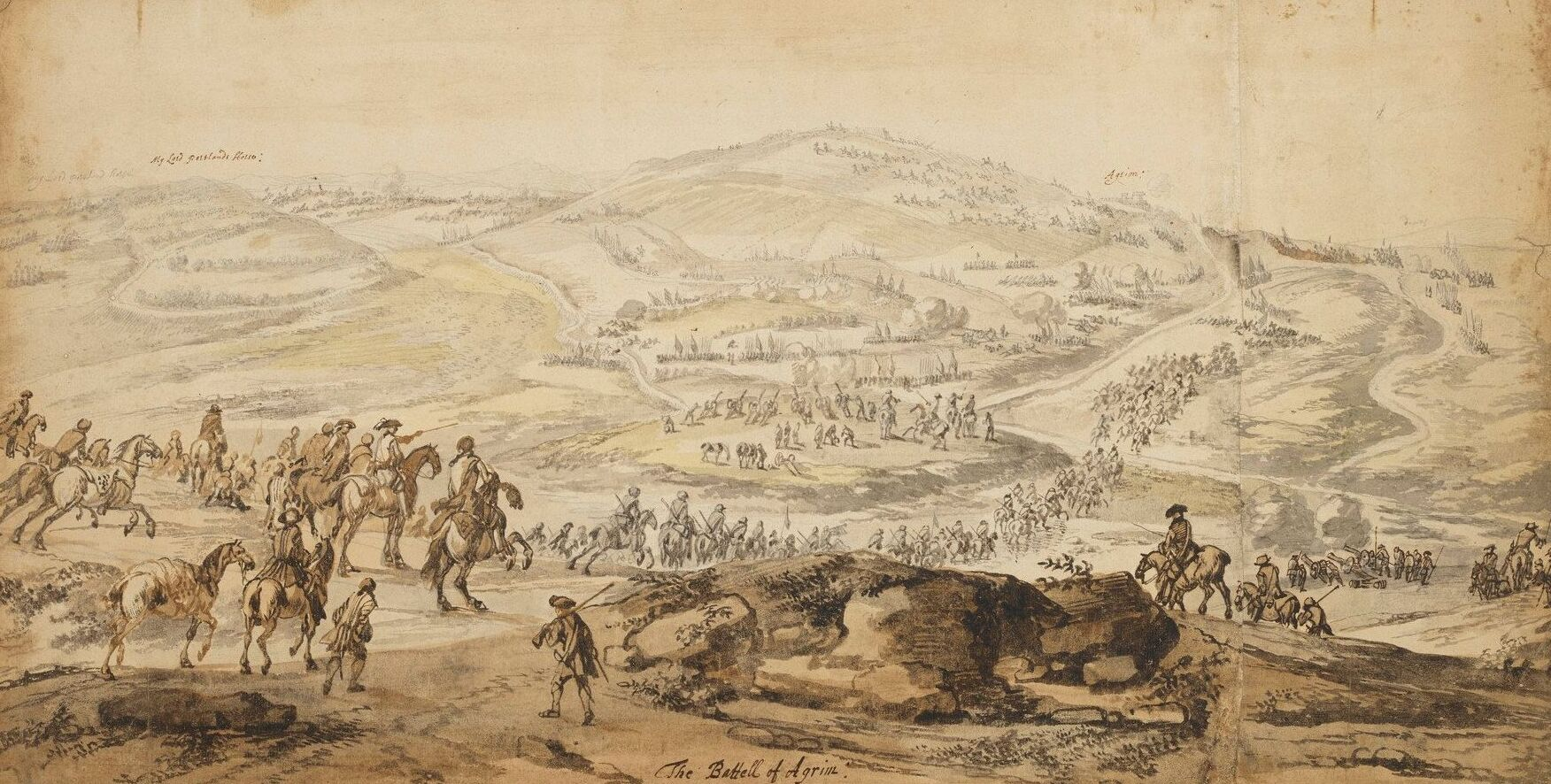
- Contemporary sketch of Aughrim, viewed from the Williamite lines, by Jan Wyk
Date	22 July [O.S. 12 July] 1691
Location	Aughrim, County Galway, Ireland 53°17′42″N 8°18′43″W
Result	Williamite and Allied victory

Belligerents
Williamites; Dutch Republic	Jacobites; France

Commanders and leaders
Godard van Reede-Ginkel	Charles Chalmot de Saint-Ruhe †

Strength
20,000	20,000–25,000

Casualties and losses
3,000 killed	4,000 killed 4,000 missing 581 captured
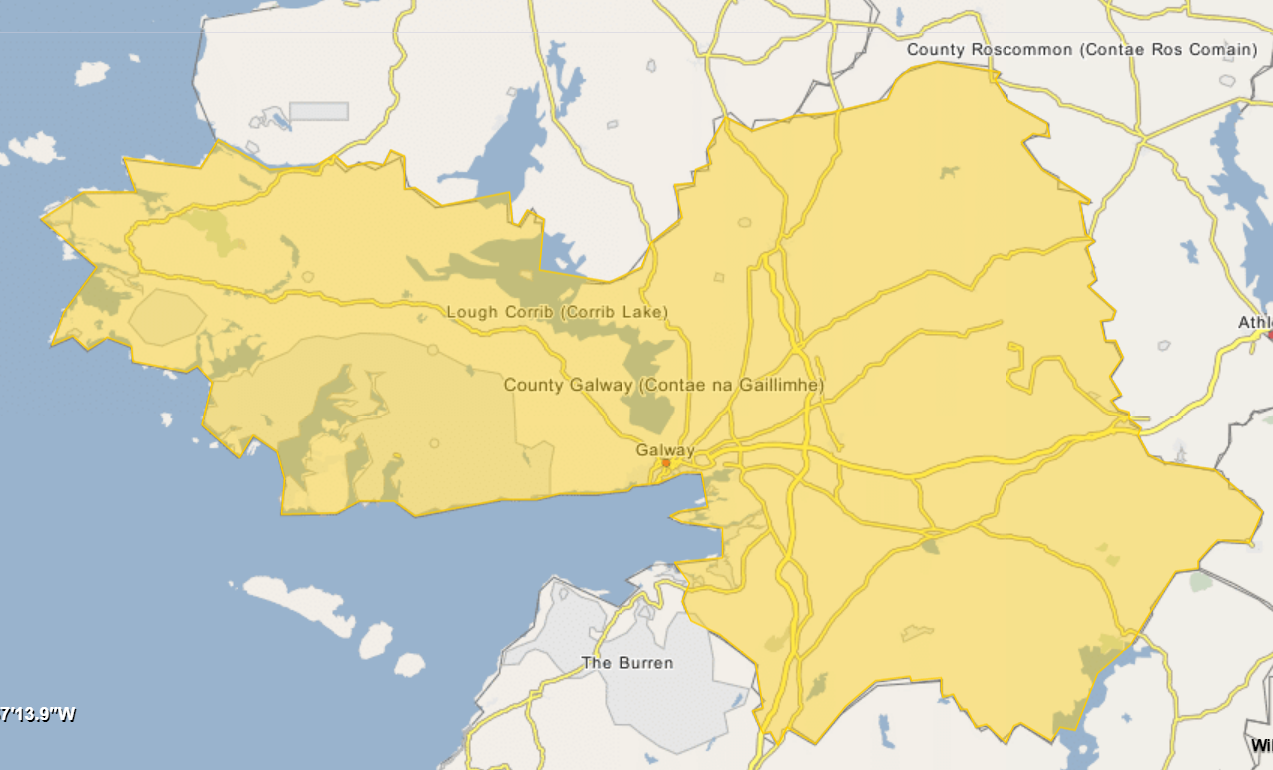
- Location within Ireland Battle of Aughrim (County Galway)

The Battle of Aughrim (Irish: Cath Eachroma) was the decisive battle of the Williamite War in Ireland. It was fought between the largely Irish Jacobite army loyal to James II and the forces of William III on 12 July 1691 (old style, equivalent to 22 July new style), near the village of Aughrim, County Galway.

The battle was one of the bloodiest ever fought in Britain and Ireland; 7,000 people were killed. The Jacobite defeat at Aughrim meant the effective end of James's cause in Ireland, although the city of Limerick held out until the autumn of 1691.

== Background ==
By 1691, the Jacobites had adopted a defensive position. In the previous year they had retreated into Connacht behind the easily defensible line of the Shannon, with strongholds at Sligo, Athlone and Limerick guarding the routes into the province and the western ports. William besieged Limerick in late August 1690 but, suffering heavy casualties and losses to disease, he called off the siege and put his army into winter quarters. However, internal divisions, exacerbated by the departure of James for France after defeat at the Boyne, were increasingly undermining the Jacobite command.

The main split was between the "Peace Party", led by James's viceroy Tyrconnell, which proposed negotiating a settlement with William, and the "War Party" of army officers grouped around Patrick Sarsfield, who believed the war could still be won outright. Encouraged by William's failure to take Limerick and looking to break Tyrconnell's influence, Sarsfield's faction decided to appeal directly to Louis XIV of France requesting that Tyrconnell and army commander Berwick be removed from office and that Louis send military aid.

The "Peace Party" obtained an offer of settlement from the Williamites in December, upon which Sarsfield demanded that Berwick have Riverston, Denis Daly and other "Peace Party" leaders arrested. Berwick complied, probably with the approval of Tyrconnell, who returned from France to try and preserve his influence by repositioning himself with Sarsfield's faction.

Alarmed by the fracturing of the Irish command, James was persuaded to request further military support directly from Louis. Louis sent general Charles Chalmot de Saint-Ruhe to replace Berwick as senior Jacobite commander, with secret instructions to assess whether Louis should send further military aid. Saint-Ruhe, accompanied by lieutenant-generals de Tessé and d'Usson, arrived at Limerick on 9 May, bringing sufficient arms, corn and meal to sustain the army until the autumn, but not the troops or money the Jacobites desperately needed.

By this stage William's forces were led by his subordinates, Dutch officer Godert de Ginkel and second-in-command Württemberg. Ginkel was conscious of the poor military situation facing William in the Netherlands, and seeking a quick end to the war obtained William's permission to offer the Jacobites moderate terms of surrender. By late spring 1691, however, Ginkel became concerned that a French convoy could land further reinforcements at Galway or Limerick, and began planning to enter the field as quickly as possible. During May, both sides began assembling forces for a summer campaign, the Jacobites at Limerick and the Williamites at Mullingar.

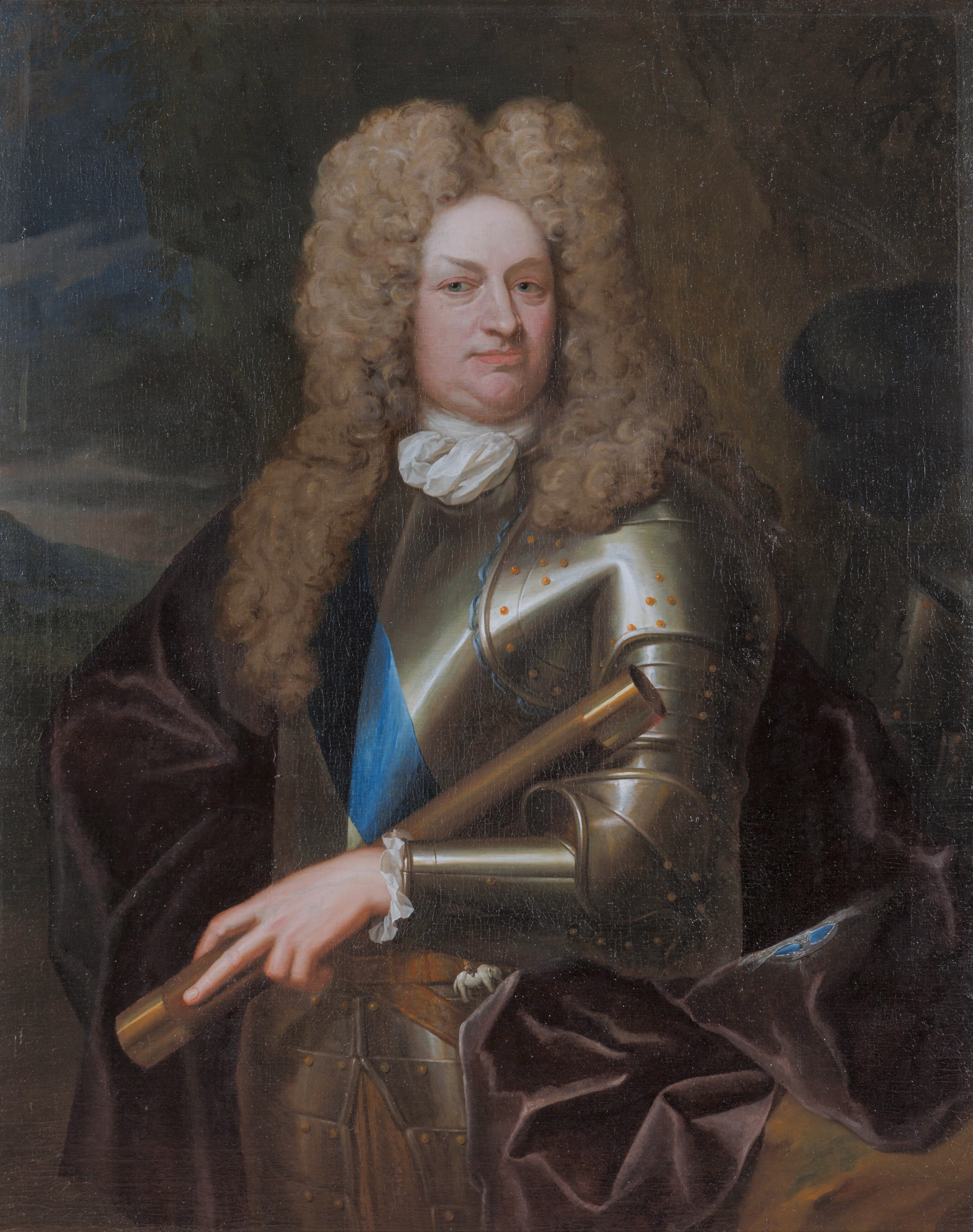
Godert de Ginkel, the Williamite commander at Aughrim

On 16 June, Ginkel's cavalry reconnoitred from Ballymore towards the Jacobite garrison at Athlone. Saint-Ruhe had been unsure where Ginkel would attempt to cross the Shannon, but by 19 June he realised Athlone was the target and began concentrating his troops west of the town. Ginkel breached the Jacobite lines of defence and took Athlone on 30 June after a bloody siege; Saint-Ruhe was unable to relieve the town and fell back to the west. Athlone was seen as a significant victory and likely to provoke the collapse of the Jacobite army. The Lords Justice in Dublin issued a proclamation offering generous terms for Jacobites who surrendered, including a free pardon, restoration of forfeited estates, and the offer of similar or higher rank and pay if they wished to join William's army.

Unaware of the location of Saint-Ruhe's main army and assuming he was outnumbered, on 10 July Ginkel continued a cautious advance through Ballinasloe down the main Limerick and Galway road. Saint-Ruhe's and Tyrconnell's plan had been to fall back on Limerick and force the Williamites into another year of campaigning, but wishing to redeem his errors at Athlone Saint-Ruhe appears to have instead decided to force a decisive battle. Ginkel found his way blocked by Saint-Ruhe's army at Aughrim on the early morning of 12 July 1691.

=== Deployments ===
At this point of the campaign, both armies were about 20,000 strong. The core of the Jacobite force was formed around James's old Irish Army, which had been reorganised by Tyrconnell from 1686 onwards by dismissing the majority of Protestant officers and men. It had been substantially expanded with newly recruited Irish Catholic regiments, organised in the English military tradition.

While it is not now possible to establish with certainty which Jacobite infantry regiments fought at Aughrim, at least 30 have been identified as likely present, including the Foot Guards, Talbot's, Nugent's, Fitzgerald's, Boffin's, Cormack O'Neill's, Saxby's and Iveagh's. The Jacobites also retained around 4,000 cavalry and dragoons, mostly much better trained and equipped than their foot.

The composition of Ginkel's army is better documented than that of the Jacobites: in addition to English regiments, it included a large number of Anglo-Irish Protestants as well as Dutch, Danish and French Huguenot contingents. Different contemporary sources give different dispositions for Ginkel's forces at Aughrim, but most agree that the right wing was composed of English, Anglo-Irish and Huguenot cavalry, with Danish and French cavalry on the left. Ginkel positioned the English infantry regiments on the right of his centre, with French, Danish and Dutch foot on their left.

According to witnesses of the battle the Jacobite lines at Aughrim occupied a strong defensive position extending over two miles. To protect his largely inexperienced infantry, Saint-Ruhe deployed most of it in two divisions under Major-Generals John Hamilton and William Dorrington along the crest of a ridge known as Kilcommadan Hill, their positions protected by small hillside enclosures and hedgerows. The centre was further screened by a large bog, impassable to cavalry, through which the Melehan River flowed. The left flank was also bounded by "a large Red Bogg, almost a mile over", through which there was only one causeway, overlooked by the deserted village of Aughrim and a ruined castle: Saint-Ruhe deployed the bulk of his cavalry here under Parker, Luttrell and Purcell, under the overall command of Dominic Sheldon. On the right flank where the Tristaun stream ran through the "Pass" of Urraghry or Urachree, much the more open and weaker position, Saint-Ruhe placed his best infantry and the cavalry regiments of Abercorn, Tyrconnell and Edmund Prendergast, all under his second-in-command, the chevalier de Tessé. According to one participant's account Patrick Sarsfield had quarrelled with Saint-Ruhe and was posted with the cavalry reserve to the left rear, under strict instructions not to move without orders. (Note: Two accounts, that given in Jacobite tract A Light to the Blind and in Macariae Excidium, place Sarsfield on the right with de Tessé and on the left, respectively. The account of Robert Parker, who fought at the battle, claims that Sarsfield was with the reserve at the rear: this is generally seen as accurate as he is not mentioned in any narrative of the battle until the retreat (see Hayes-McCoy (1942), p. 18).)

== Battle ==
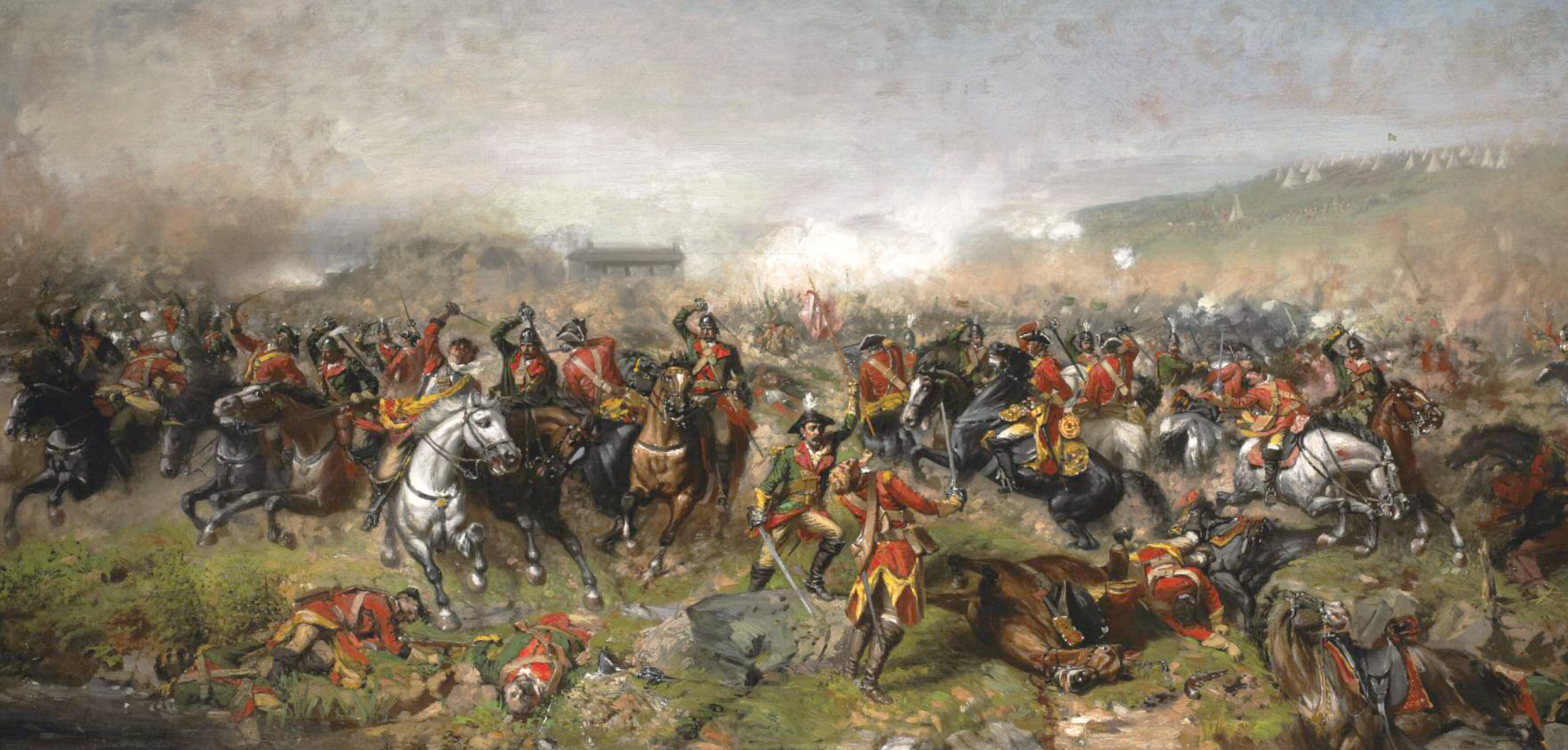
The Battle of Aughrim (1885) by John Mulvany

After heavy mist all morning, Ginkel's forces moved into position by about two o'clock in the afternoon, and both sides cannonaded each other for the next few hours. Ginkel planned to avoid fully joining battle until the next day; he ordered a probing attack on the Jacobites' weaker right flank led by a captain and sixteen Danish troopers, followed by 200 of Cunningham's Eniskillen dragoons.

The Jacobite response demonstrated the strength of their defence but also meant that the attackers were no longer able to break off the engagement as Ginkel had planned. A conference was held at about 4 pm: Ginkel still favoured withdrawing, but the Williamite infantry general Hugh Mackay argued for an immediate full-scale attack.

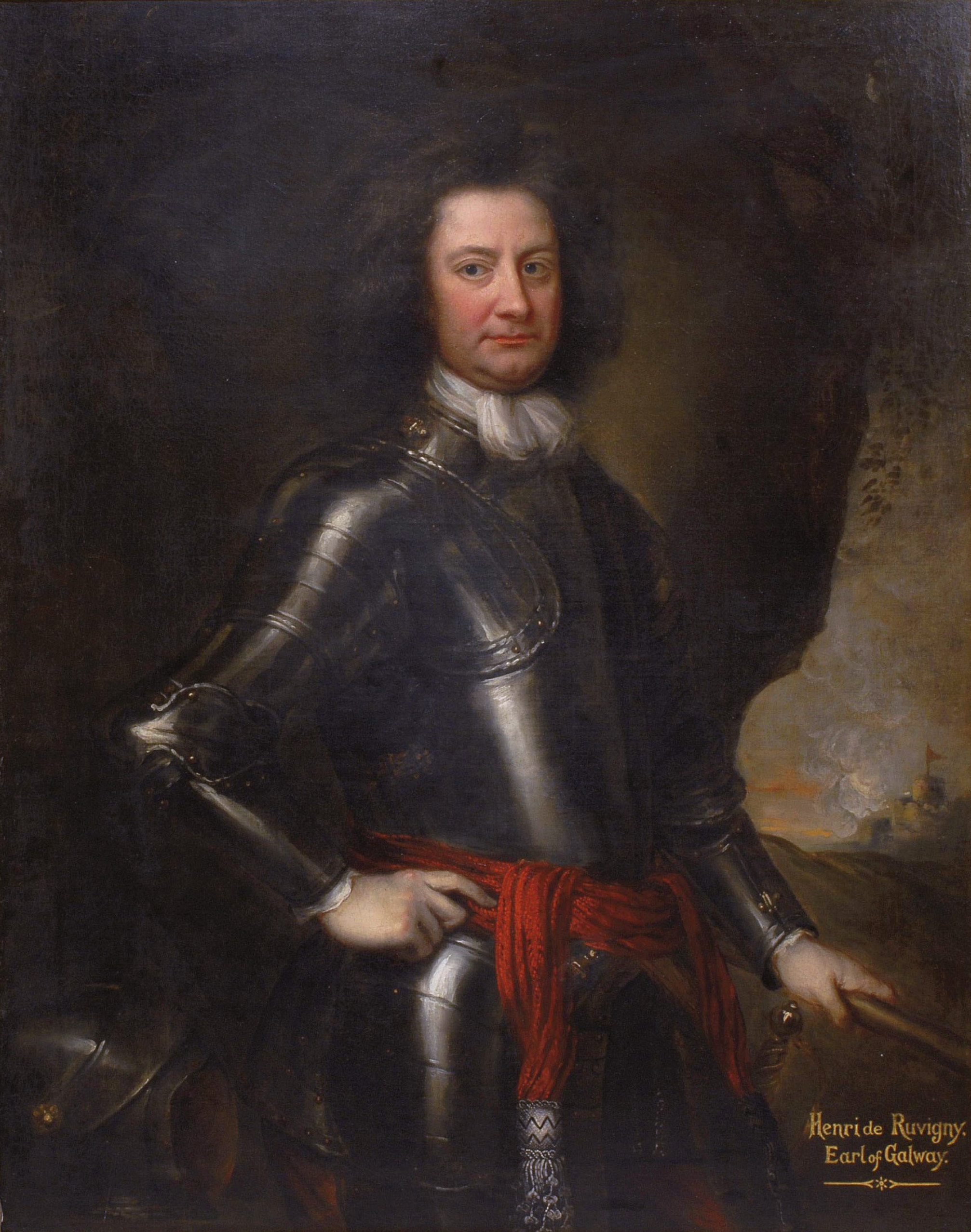
Henri de Massue led the right of the Williamite cavalry at Aughrim. A French Protestant, he had entered William's service in 1690, forfeiting his French estates and title (the Marquis de Rouvigny) as a result.

Battle was joined in earnest between five and six o'clock. In the centre, the largely English and Scots regiments under Mackay attempted a frontal assault on Dorrington's infantry on Kilcommadan Hill. The attackers had to contend with waist-deep water and a tenacious Irish defence of the reinforced hedge lines. They withdrew with heavy losses: the Jacobites pursued them downhill, capturing colonels Erle and Herbert.

On their left centre, the Williamites advanced across low ground exposed to Jacobite fire and took a great number of casualties. The Williamite assault in this area, led by St John's and Tiffin's regiments and the Huguenot foot, was driven back into the bog by the Irish foot fighting with clubbed (reversed) muskets; many of the attackers were killed or drowned. In the rout, the pursuing Jacobites managed to spike a battery of Williamite guns. The Jacobite regiments of the Guards and Gordon O'Neill were said to have fought particularly strongly. The musketry was so intense that "the ridges seemed to be ablaze" according to Andreas Claudianus, a Norwegian fighting with the Danish infantry.

The Jacobite right and centre holding firm, Ginkel tried to force a way across the causeway on the Jacobite left, where any attack would have to pass along a narrow lane covered by Walter Burke's regiment from their positions in Aughrim castle. Four battalions led by Brigadier Kirke secured positions near the castle, following which Compton's Royal Horse Guards got across the causeway at the third attempt. Dorrington having earlier withdrawn two battalions of infantry from this area to reinforce the Jacobite centre, they were faced only with weak opposition, reaching Aughrim village. While a force of Jacobite cavalry and dragoons under Luttrell had been tasked with covering this flank, their commander had ordered them to fall back, following a route now known locally as "Luttrell's Pass". Rumours later flew that he had been in the pay of William, although it seems most probable that Luttrell withdrew as he had little or no infantry support. The cavalry regiments of Henri de Massue, Lanier, Langston and Byerley also crossed the causeway, attacking Dorrington's flank.

Most commentators, even those sympathetic to William, judged that the Irish foot had fought exceptionally well, and some accounts including James II's Memoirs claim that Saint-Ruhe was "in a transport of joy to see the foot [...] behave themselves so well".

Appearing to believe that the battle could be won, he was heard to shout, "they are running, we will chase them back to the gates of Dublin", before riding across the battlefield to direct the defence against the Williamite cavalry on his left wing. However, as he rode over to rally his cavalry, Saint-Ruhe paused briefly to direct the fire of a battery, and was decapitated by a cannonball; his death was said to have occurred around sunset, shortly after eight o'clock.

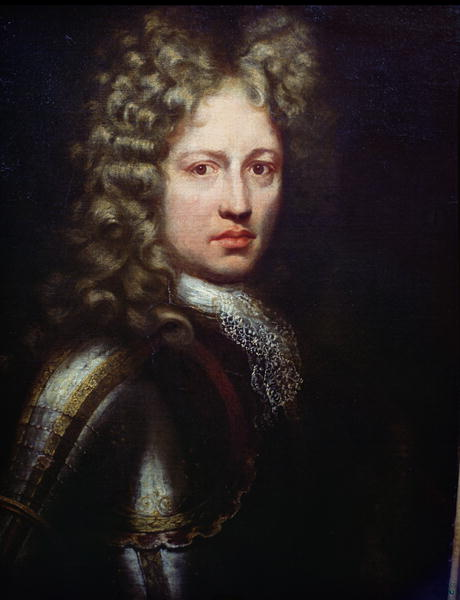
Jacobite cavalry officer Patrick Sarsfield. Sarsfield's large reserve of cavalry could have countered the Williamite advance, but he had been ordered not to move without specific orders by the Jacobite commander.

After Saint-Ruhe's death the Jacobite left, devoid of a senior commander, collapsed very quickly: the regiment of Horse Guards left the field almost immediately, followed shortly by the cavalry and dragoon regiments of Luttrell, Sheldon and Galmoy. (Note: Modern scholarly opinion is divided on the significance of St Ruth's death, as the critical breakthrough on the Jacobite left occurred prior to it: even at the time the Duke of Berwick suggested the battle would have been lost even if St Ruth had lived.) De Tessé attempted to head a cavalry counter-attack but was seriously wounded shortly afterwards. The Jacobite left flank was now exposed: Mackay and Tollemache also attacked again in the centre, pushing the Jacobites towards the hilltop. Burke and his regiment, still holding the castle, were forced to surrender. Most of the infantry remained unaware of Saint-Ruhe's death, however, and Hamilton's infantry on the Jacobite right continued to counter-attack, fighting the Huguenot foot to a standstill in an area still known locally as the "Bloody Hollow". At around nine o'clock towards nightfall the Jacobite infantry were finally pushed to the top of Killcommadan hill and broke, fleeing towards a bog in the left rear of their position, while their cavalry retreated towards Loughrea.

Sarsfield and Galmoy briefly tried to organise a rearguard action but as in many battles of the period, most of the Jacobite casualties occurred in the pursuit, which was ended only by darkness and the onset of mist and rain. It has been suggested that many of the defeated infantry had thrown away their weapons in order to run away faster from the Williamite cavalry.

In addition to the rank and file the Jacobite casualties and prisoners included many of its most experienced infantry officers: the dead included brigadiers Barker, O'Neill and O'Connell, and colonels Moore, Talbot, O'Mahony, Nugent, Felix O'Neil and Ulick Burke, Lord Galway. The two major-generals commanding the Jacobite centre, Hamilton and Dorrington, were both taken prisoner, Hamilton dying of wounds shortly afterwards. Though the killing of prisoners to prevent rescue was a common practice at the time, Jacobite soldiers were accused of having "cut to pieces" colonel Herbert after his capture. One contemporary Jacobite source (Leslie) alleged that about 2,000 Jacobites were killed "in cold blood" with many, including Lord Galway and colonel Charles Moore, killed after being promised quarter.

An eyewitness with the Williamite army, George Story, wrote that "from the top of the Hill where [the Jacobite] Camp had been," the bodies "looked like a great Flock of Sheep, scattered up and down the Countrey for almost four Miles round."

== Aftermath ==
Estimates of the two armies' losses vary, but they were extremely heavy overall; it is generally agreed that 7,000 men were killed at Aughrim. Aughrim has been described as "quite possibly the bloodiest battle ever fought in the British Isles", but earlier medieval battles, although poorly recorded, may rival this battle in casualty numbers. At the time, the Williamites claimed to have lost only 600 and to have killed some 7,000 Jacobites. Some recent studies put the Williamite losses as high as 3,000, but they are more generally given as between 1-2,000, with 4,000 Jacobites killed. Another 4,000 Jacobites had deserted, while Ginkel recorded 526 prisoners taken of all ranks. While Ginkel had given word to Dorrington that the captives would be treated as prisoners of war, general officers were instead taken to the Tower of London as prisoners of state, while the majority of the rank and file were incarcerated on Lambay Island where many died of disease and starvation.

Aughrim was the decisive battle of the conflict: the Jacobites had lost many experienced officers, along with much of the army's equipment and supplies. The remnants of the Jacobite army retreated to the mountains before regrouping under Sarsfield's command at Limerick. Many of their infantry regiments were seriously depleted: on 22 July, Bellew's regiment was listed as having 240 soldiers, having lost all its senior officers and sergeants; Slane's regiment 140 soldiers, and Louth's just 28, although some stragglers arrived later. The city of Galway surrendered without a fight after the battle, on advantageous terms, while Sarsfield and the Jacobites' main army surrendered shortly afterwards at Limerick after a short siege.

=== Cultural impact ===
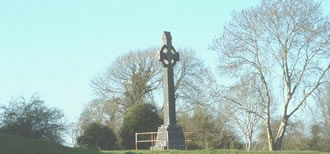
Memorial cross on the site of the Battle of Aughrim

According to Ó Ciardha, the battle "made a searing impression on the Irish consciousness". Irish tradition came to refer to the battle as "Eachdhroim an áir" – "Aughrim of the slaughter" – after a line in a poem by Irish-language poet Séamas Dall Mac Cuarta, the "Elegy for Sorley MacDonnell". While Ginkel ordered the burial of his own dead, the remaining Jacobites were left unburied, their bones remaining scattered on the battlefield for years afterwards: (Note: At least some were later collected: Sir Thomas Molyneux, 1st Baronet, a visitor to Kilconnell Friary in 1709, noted that the churchyard was then "surrounded by a wall of dead men's sckulls and bones pil'd very orderly [...] clear round against the wall to the length of 88 foot [...] within they shew you Ld. Gallway's and other great men's heads killed at Aghrim". The local landlord appears to have finally arranged burial in the 1860s.) Mac Cuarta wrote "It is at Aughrim of the slaughter where they are to be found, their damp bones lying uncoffined".

John Dunton in his work, Teague Land, an account of his travels in Ireland written seven years after the battle, wrote that: "After the battle the English did not tarry to bury any of the dead but their own, and left those of the enemy exposed to the fowls of the air, for the country was then so uninhabited that there were not hands to inter them. Many dogs resorted to this aceldama where for want of other food they fed on man's [sic] flesh, and thereby became so dangerous and fierce that a single person could not pass that way without manifest hazard". He ends the description with the story of a faithful greyhound belonging to a Jacobite killed in the battle who remained by his master's body defending it until shot by a passing soldier in January of the following year.

While Aughrim remained a powerful symbol of disaster for Irish Catholics, it was also the focus of Loyalist (particularly Orange Order) celebrations in Ireland on 12 July up until the early 19th century. Thereafter, it was superseded by the Battle of the Boyne in commemorations on "the Twelfth" due to the switch to the Gregorian calendar (in which 1 July OS became 11 July NS and 12 July OS became 22 July NS).

It has been suggested that the Boyne became emphasised because the Irish troops could be more easily presented as cowardly than at Aughrim, where they were generally agreed to have fought bravely. The Loyalist song The Sash mentions Aughrim.

The battle was the subject of a 1728 tragic drama by Robert Ashton, The Battle of Aughrim or the Fall of Monsieur St Ruth, which after initial neglect became enormously popular from 1770 onwards into the 19th century. Though the play was intended to celebrate the Williamite victory and casts Saint-Ruhe firmly in the role of antagonist, it also portrays Sarsfield and his lieutenants as heroic figures and incorporates a "lament for Catholic patriotism", so that "both Catholics and Protestants were attracted to the play for generations". In 1804 it was noted of Ashton's play that "a more popular Production never appeared in Ireland; it is in the hands of every Peasant who can read English; and [...] is committed to memory and occasionally recited". In 1885, artist John Mulvany completed a painting of the battle; it was exhibited in Dublin in 2010. The Battle of Aughrim was also the subject of a long 1968 poem by Richard Murphy, who noted that he had ancestors fighting on both sides.

The Aughrim battlefield site became the subject of controversy in Ireland over plans to build the new M6 motorway through the former battlefield. Historians, environmentalists and members of the Orange Order objected to the plans; the motorway opened in 2009.

=== Aughrim Interpretative Centre ===
The Battle of Aughrim Interpretative Centre, in Aughrim village was opened in 1991. It is a collaboration between Aughrim Heritage Committee, Ireland West Tourism and Galway County Council. It houses artefacts found on the battlefield site, as well as three-dimensional displays and a documentary film that explains the course of the battle and its significance in the wider context of the history of Ireland.

== See also ==
- List of conflicts in Ireland

== Sources ==
- Boulger, Demetrius C., The Battle of the Boyne, Together with an Account Based on French & Other Unpublished Records of the War in Ireland 1688–1691 Martin Secker, London, 1911 (Available as pdf)
- Piers Wauchope, Patrick Sarsfield and the Williamite War, Dublin 1992.
- J. G. Simms, Jacobite Ireland, London 1969.
- G. A., Hayes-McCoy, Irish Battles, Belfast 1990.
- Eamonn O Ciardha, Ireland and the Jacobite cause – a Fatal Attachment, Dublin 2002.
- Padraig Lenihan, 1690, Battle of the Boyne, Tempus, 2003.
- Van Nimwegen, Olaf (2020). De Veertigjarige Oorlog 1672–1712. Prometheus. ISBN 978-90-446-3871-4.
- Bodart, Gaston (1908). Militär-historisches Kriegs-Lexikon (1618–1905).
