= Irish Brigade (France) =

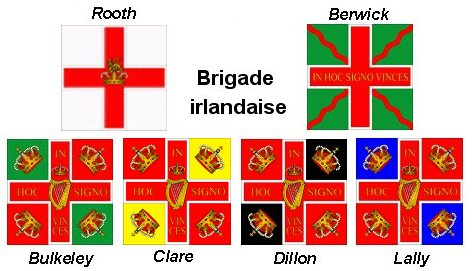
- Regimental flags of the Irish Brigade.
- Active: May 1690 – 1791
- Country: France
- Allegiance: Kingdom of France and Stuart claimants to the thrones of Great Britain and Ireland (Jacobitism)
- Branch: French Royal Army
- Type: Infantry
- Size: Three to six regiments
- Mottos: Semper et ubique Fidelis (Always and Everywhere Faithful)
- Colors: red
- Engagements: Nine Years' War: Battle of Steenkerque; War of the Spanish Succession: Battle of Malplaquet; War of the Austrian Succession: Battle of Fontenoy; Jacobite rising of 1745: Battle of Falkirk Muir; Battle of Culloden

Commanders
- Notable commanders: The Hon. Arthur Dillon; Justin MacCarthy; Thomas Arthur, comte de Lally, baron de Tollendal, maréchal de camp

The Irish Brigade (Irish: Briogáid Éireannach, French: Brigade irlandaise) was a brigade in the French Royal Army composed of Irish exiles, led by Lord Mountcashel. It was formed in May 1690 when five Jacobite regiments were sent from Ireland to France in exchange for a larger force of French infantry who were sent to fight in the Williamite War in Ireland. The regiments comprising the Irish Brigade retained their special status as foreign units in the French Army until nationalised in 1791.

== Formation ==
When King James II went to Ireland in March 1689, Ireland was ruled by his viceroy Tyrconnell and was held by the Irish Army, which was loyal to King James. There seemed to be no need for the deployment of French troops in Ireland and Louis XIV needed his troops elsewhere during the Nine Years' War. When the Irish Army showed its weakness by failing to win the Siege of Derry and losing the minor Battle of Newtownbutler on 31 July 1689, Lauzun was sent to Ireland with a French force of 5000 men but Ireland had to send Irish troops to France in exchange. This was the Irish Brigade, formed in May 1690. It consisted of five regiments, comprising together about 5000 men. The regiments were named after their colonels:

1. Lord Mountcashel,
2. Butler,
3. Feilding,
4. O'Brien, and
5. Dillon's Regiment, commanded by Arthur Dillon.

The French reformed them and disbanded Butler's and Feilding's, incorporating their men into the remaining three regiments, which were:

1. Mountcashel's
2. O'Brien's, and
3. Dillon's

These three regiments formed the first Irish Brigade in France and were known as Lord Mountcashel's Irish Brigade and served the French with distinction during the remainder of the Nine Years' War (1689–97).

Under the terms of the Treaty of Limerick in 1691, which ended the war between King James II and VII and King William III in Ireland, a separate force of 12,000 Jacobites of the Irish Army had arrived in France in an event known as Flight of the Wild Geese. These were kept separate from the Irish Brigade and were formed into King James's own army in exile, albeit in the pay of France. Dorrington's regiment, later Rooth or Roth, following the Treaty of Ryswick in 1698, was formed from the former 1st and 2nd battalions James II's Royal Irish Foot Guards (formerly on the Irish establishment) of Britain.

== Service ==
With the Treaty of Ryswick in 1697, King James's army in exile was disbanded, though many of its officers and men were reformed into new regiments. Having been merged into the original Irish Brigade these units served the French well until the French Revolution. Other Irishmen – such as Peter Lacy – proceeded to enter the Austrian service on an individual basis.

The Irish Brigade became one of the elite units of the French Army. While increasingly diluted by French and foreign recruits from elsewhere in Europe, its Irish-born officers and men often aspired to return to aid Ireland and regain their ancestral lands, as some did during the Jacobite Rebellion of 1745.

Irish regiments participated in most of the major land battles fought by the French between 1690 and 1789, particularly Steenkirk (1692), Neerwinden (1693), Marsaglia (1693), Blenheim (1704), Almansa (1707), Malplaquet (1709), Fontenoy (1745), Battle of Lauffeld (1747); and Rossbach (1757).

Units of the Irish Brigade took part in the rising of 1715 and the rising of 1745. For the latter, a composite battalion of infantry ("Irish Picquets") comprising detachments from each of the regiments of the Irish Brigade, plus one cavalry regiment, Fitzjames' horse, was sent to Scotland and landed with Richard Warren at Stonehaven in October 1745. This trained and disciplined force saw action at the second Battle of Falkirk (where they cemented the victory by driving off the Hanoverians causing the clans to waver) and Culloden, alongside the regiment of Royal Scots (Royal Ecossais) which had been raised the year before in French service. As serving soldiers of the French King the Irish Picquets were able to formally surrender as a unit after Culloden with a promise of honourable treatment and were not subjected to the reprisals suffered by the Highland clansmen. Many other exiled Jacobites in the French army were captured en route to Scotland in late 1745 and early 1746, including Charles Radcliffe, 5th Earl of Derwentwater, a captain in Dillon's regiment who was executed in London in 1746.

In the interim, however, the Brigade found itself briefly opposed to its Spanish counterpart in the War of the Quadruple Alliance in 1718–20, as France was allied to the Jacobites' Hanoverian rivals. As a result, it was Spain who assisted the Highland Jacobites in their rising that ended in the Battle of Glen Shiel in 1719. The 1716 Anglo-French alliance had effectively secured the Hanoverian succession in Ireland and Britain. Despite the alliance France continued to recognize James III as legitimate, and therefore individual Jacobites amongst the Irish regiments in France continued to hope for decades that their cause would eventually succeed. After its early years however the Brigade increasingly became a professional force made up of Irish soldiers who enlisted for reasons of family tradition or in search of opportunities denied them at home, rather than for directly political motives.

Irish regiments served in the War of the Austrian Succession, Seven Years' War, both in Europe and India, and during the American War of Independence, though by the 1740s the number of Irishmen serving in the regiments had begun to markedly decline. The five regiments were increased to six during the War of the Austrian Succession, the sixth being Lally's, initially created by the Comte de Lally -Tollendal through drafts from the original five. Each regiment had a strength of one battalion of 685 men and Fitzjames's cavalry regiment counted 240 men. The Brigade played a crucial role at Fontenoy, attacking the right flank of a British column and suffering 656 casualties. O'Callaghan claims the Irish Brigade captured the colours of the Coldstream Guards during this engagement, as well as fifteen cannon. McGarry, in a recently published book entitled Irish Brigades Abroad, disputes this claim. Instead stating the standard in question was the flag of Sempill's Regiment of Foot, the forerunner of the King's Own Scottish Borderers. The Irish suffered even higher casualties of around 1400 men, at the Battle of Lauffeld when they led the assault which drove the Pragmatic Army from the village of Lauffeld and secured victory. During the Seven Years' War the Irish Regiments in French service were: Bulkeley, Clare, Dillon, Rooth, Berwick and Lally as well as one regiment of cavalry (Fitzjames's).

From January 1766 the Papacy formally recognised George III of the Hanoverian dynasty as the lawful monarch of Britain and Ireland, and refused to recognise Bonnie Prince Charlie, who was now styled as King Charles III by the Jacobites. The rise of George III also saw the Tories come back to power with John Stuart, 3rd Earl of Bute forming a ministry – the Tories had previously included high-placed, financially powerful Jacobites. There were always a number of English and Scots serving in the Brigade, though their numbers fluctuated markedly over the years. A database being compiled by the Centre for Irish-Scottish Studies at Trinity College suggests that for every ten Irishmen, there were on average two Englishmen and one Scot.

During the American War of Independence, the brigade participated in the Capture of Grenada, the Siege of Savannah, the Invasion of Tobago, the Capture of Sint Eustatius, and the Siege of Brimstone Hill. Walsh's regiment is noted for aiding the American cause in the American Revolution, when a detachment was assigned as marines to John Paul Jones' ship, the Bonhomme Richard. Lt. Edward Stack commanded the division in the main top of the Bonhomme Richard during her battle with HMS Serapis. The USS Stack is named for him. Their involvement and use of the motto "Semper et Ubique Fidelis" may have influenced the subsequent adoption of the motto "Semper Fidelis" by the U.S. Marines.

== Recruitment ==
Until the Seven Years' War the British authorities had turned a blind eye to semi-organised recruitment within Ireland itself for the regiments of the Brigade. As long as the Irish troops were not employed against Britain or its allies, this was seen as a useful way of removing potentially discontented men of military age. In 1729 a confidential treaty between the French and British governments made provision for the engagement of 750 Irish recruits provided that this activity remained unpublicized. After the employment of the Irish Picquets (an ad hoc force made up of detachments from each regiment of the Irish Brigade) in support of the Jacobite rising in Scotland showed the danger of such a policy, measures were taken to reduce the flow of Irish recruits to French service. Individual recruiters for the Irish Brigade were hanged if caught and during the Seven Years' War all British subjects in French service were declared traitors by Parliament and liable to execution if taken prisoner. This draconian measure does not, however, appear to have been implemented, except where individual prisoners of war were identified as having first deserted from the British Army.

By the eve of the French Revolution in 1789 direct Irish recruitment into the Irish Brigade had diminished to a limited number having the motive and opportunity to make their own way to France. Irishmen serving in the British Army and taken prisoner during the French wars might find themselves being encouraged to literally change their coats and enlist in the Brigade. The shortfall in numbers was made up by the increasing substitution of German, Swiss and other foreigners, plus some Frenchmen. The officers, however, were mainly drawn from Franco-Irish families which might have existed for several generations since their founders had migrated to France. Distinguished military service led to such families being accepted into the French aristocracy while retaining their Irish names and consciousness of origin.

== Uniforms and flags ==
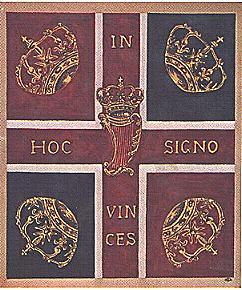
Colour of Dillon's Regiment, Irish Brigade

The Irish Brigade wore red coats throughout the eighteenth century with different facing colours to distinguish each regiment. It has been suggested that the red coat was an expression of their loyalty to the Stuart claimants to the throne of Britain and Ireland. However, uniforms of this colour were widely worn by foreign regiments in the French service, notably those recruited in Switzerland. The use of Saint George's Cross on all the Brigade's flags reflected their acceptance of the central importance of James III's claim to the Crown of England.

Details of each individual regiment were:

- Buckeley Infanterie. Red coat, collar and lining, dark green cuffs and waistcoat with white (i.e. pewter) buttons.
- Clare Infanterie. Red coat and waistcoat, yellow facings, white buttons.
- Dillon Infanterie. Red coat and waistcoat, no collar, black cuffs, yellow (i.e. bronze) buttons.
- Roth Infanterie. Red coat, no collar. Blue cuffs, lining, waistcoat and breeches, yellow buttons.
- Berwick Infanterie. Red coat and waistcoat, black collar and cuffs, white lining, double vertical pocket flaps, yellow buttons, six on each pocket flap.
- Lally Infanterie. Red coat, bright green collar, cuffs and waistcoat, yellow buttons.

The 1791 provisional regulations, on the eve of the disestablishment of the Irish Brigade, gave black facings to all four regiments with only minor distinctions to distinguish each unit.

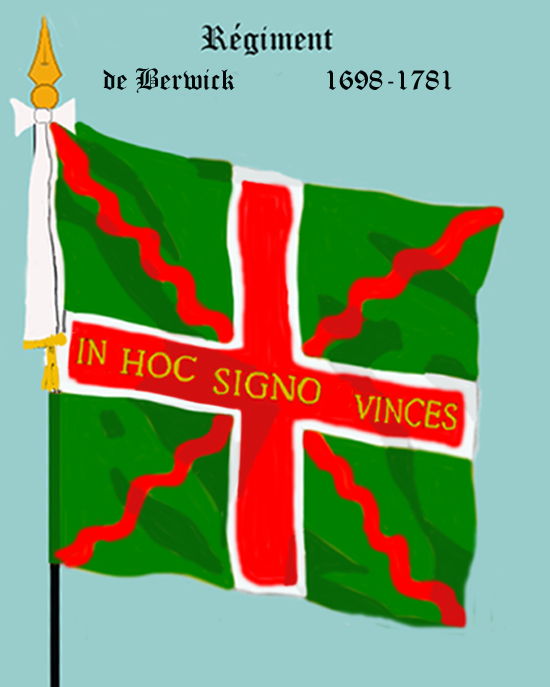
Flag of the "Régiment Berwick"

Most of their Colours were representative of their British Jacobite origins, with every regimental colour carrying the cross of St George and the four crowns of England, Ireland, Scotland and France. Nearly all the regiments' flags carried a crown over an Irish harp in the centre, one exception being Roth's regiment of former Foot Guards, whose official title in the 1690s was the King of England's Foot Guards; their flag was a red cross of St George with a crown in the centre surmounted by a crowned lion. They carried the motto In Hoc Signo Vinces. Another was the Earl of Clancarty's, whose flag became that of the Duke of Berwick's regiment when the latter was founded in 1698 following the abolition and merger of Clancarty's and several other regiments to form Berwick's, later, in 1743, Fitzjames's infantry. A correct representation of the flag carried by Berwick's regiment can be seen by following the link below to the Flags of the French army. Fitzjames's cavalry regiment standard had a French design of a yellow field with a central radiant sun surmounted by a ribbon with the motto: Nec Pluribus Impar, [Not Unequal to Many].

== Language ==
Some officers of the Irish Brigade are believed to have cried out Cuimhnígí ar Luimneach agus ar fheall na Sasanach! ("Remember Limerick and Saxon perfidy") at the battle of Fontenoy in 1745. Modern research by Eoghan Ó hAnnracháin claims that it is very doubtful if the regiments would also have been chanting in Irish, a language unknown to probably a majority of the brigade at the time. Others strongly dispute this, as over the course of 100 years new recruits were brought into the brigade mostly from the Irish-speaking regions of West Munster, the homeland of, among others the O'Connell family of Derrynane House. Stephen McGarry also makes the point in his book Irish Brigades Abroad that Irish was widely spoken in the Irish regiments of France. Daniel Charles O'Connell was the uncle of The Liberator Daniel O'Connell and was the last Colonel of the French Irish Brigade in 1794 and rose to general rank. The O'Connells were native Munster Irish speakers and members of the dispossessed Gaelic nobility of Ireland. According to official French Royal Army regulations, officers of the Irish Brigade regiments had to be Irish, half of whom had to be born in Ireland and the other half born of Irish descent in France. In practice by the outbreak of the French Revolution most serving officers of the Brigade fell into the second category.

Seamus MacManus shows in his book The Story of The Irish Race (1921):

"In truth, it was not the "Wild Geese" who forgot the tongue of the Gael or let it perish. We are told that the watchwords and the words of command in the "Brigade" were always in Irish and that officers who did not know the language before they entered the service found themselves of necessity compelled to learn it."

== End of the Irish Brigade ==
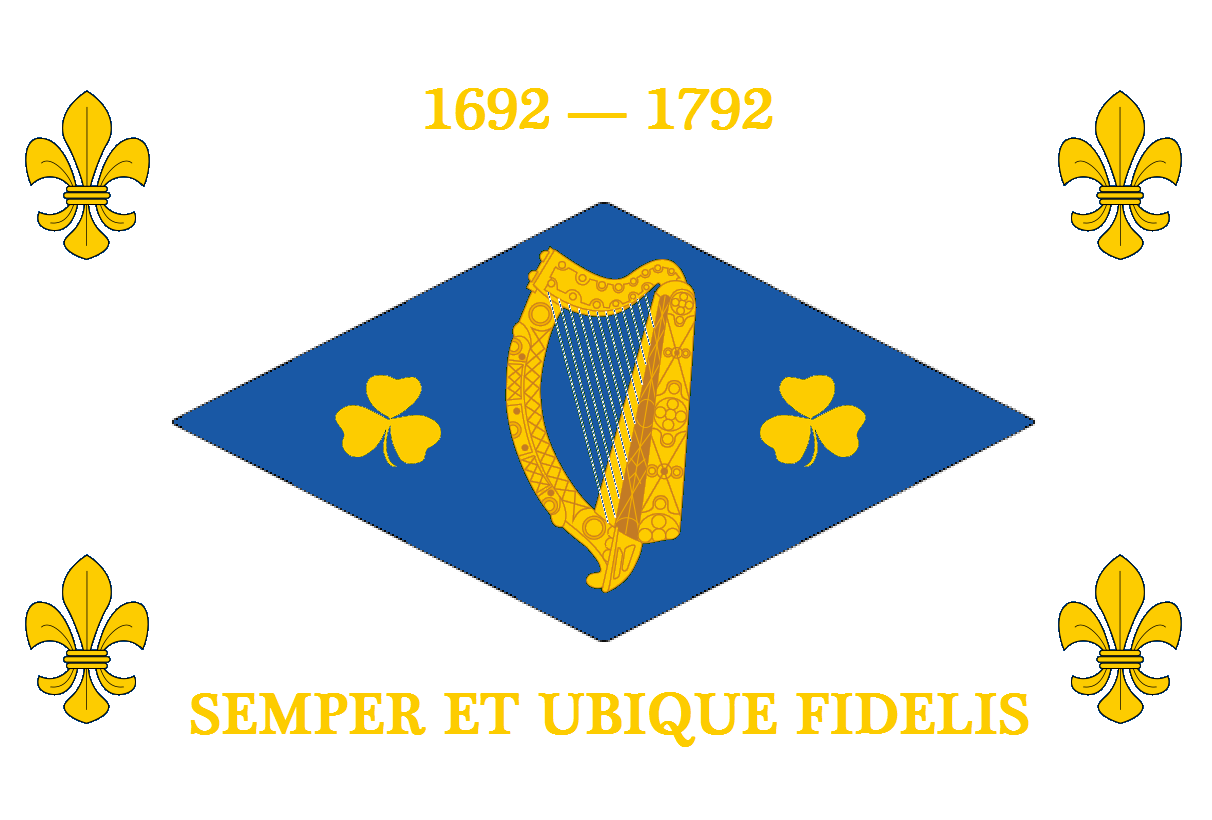
The Farewell Banner.

The Brigade ceased to exist as a separate and distinct entity on 21 July 1791. Along with the other non-Swiss foreign units, the Irish regiments underwent "nationalization" at the orders of the National Assembly. This involved their being assimilated into the regular French Army as line infantry; losing their traditional titles, practices, regulations and uniforms. The initial (early 1791) restructuring of the army had already seen the Dillon Regiment become the 87e Regiment, Berwick the 88e, and Walsh the 92e. The 92nd Infantry Regiment remains in active service the French Army today, having seen action in the Napoleonic Wars, the Franco-Prussian War, and both the World Wars.

Gentlemen, we acknowledge the inappreciable services that France has received from the Irish Brigade, in the course of the last 100 years; services that we shall never forget, though under an impossibility on requiting them. Receive this Standard as a pledge of our remembrance, a monument of our admiration, and our respect, and in future, generous Irishmen, this shall be the motto of your spotless flag: 1692–1792, Semper et ubique Fidelis.

— Count de Provence (afterwards Louis XVIII)

The members of the Irish Brigade had historically sworn loyalty to the King of France, not to the French people or their new republic of 1792. In 1792 some elements of the Brigade, who had rallied to the émigré Royalist forces, were presented with a "farewell banner" bearing the device of an Irish Harp embroidered with shamrocks and fleurs-de-lis.

Of the two senior Dillon officers who remained in the French Revolutionary Army, Theobald was killed by his soldiers when in retreat in 1792 and Arthur was executed in 1794 during The Terror. In 1793 the former Dillon Regiment was split into the 157th and 158th Line regiments. By 1794 some officers felt that the Government of the French First Republic had become too anti-Catholic, and joined the Catholic Irish Brigade organized by William Pitt the Younger. In 1803, the Irish Legion was formed by Napoleon Bonaparte for Irishmen willing to take part in his planned invasion of Ireland.

== Literature ==
Stephen McGarry's Irish Brigades Abroad (Dublin, 2013 Kindle edition, paperback May 2014) is a new book on the subject and finally updates John Cornelius O'Callaghan's History of the Irish Brigades in the Service of France (London, 1870). Mark McLaughlin's The Wild Geese, (London, 1980) was published by Osprey as part of their Men-at-Arms series and provides an introduction to the subject.

== See also ==
- Battle of Fontenoy
- Flight of the Wild Geese
- Franco-Irish Ambulance Brigade
- Patrice de MacMahon, Duke of Magenta
- Patrick Sarsfield, 1st Earl of Lucan
- Scottish Guards (France)
