= Royal Irish Regiment of Foot Guards =

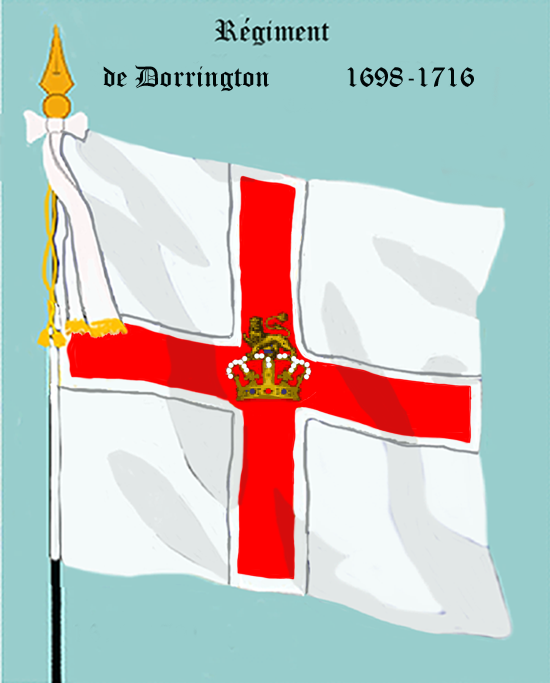
- Regimental standard (1698–1716)
- Active: 1662–1698; 1698–1791 (in French Army)
- Country: Kingdom of Ireland; France
- Type: Foot Guards
- Role: Line infantry
- Size: (1662) 12 companies; 1,200 men (1690) 26 companies; 2,080 men
- Garrison/HQ: Dublin (to 1688)
- March: When the king enjoys his own again
- Engagements: Nine Years' War; War of the Austrian Succession; 1745 Jacobite Rising; Seven Years' War; American Revolutionary War

Commanders
- Colonel of the Regiment: Richard Butler, 1st Earl of Arran
- Notable commanders: William Dorrington

The Royal Irish Regiment of Foot Guards, or His Majesty’s Regiment of Guards in Ireland, was a regiment of foot guards first raised in 1662 for service in Ireland. Part of the Irish Army of Charles II, it was initially garrisoned around Dublin.

During the 1688 Glorious Revolution, the Foot Guards under their commanding officer William Dorrington stayed loyal to James II, and fought on the Jacobite side in the Williamite War in Ireland. After the 1697 Peace of Ryswick and the formal disestablishment of James’s army in exile, the Foot Guards were immediately reconstituted in French service as Dorrington’s Regiment, retaining their red coats and Saint George's Cross standard. As part of the Irish Brigade they distinguished themselves in a number of campaigns.

Renamed the Regiment Roth after a subsequent colonel, Michael Roth, and later still as the Regiment Walsh, the regiment did not formally disband until 1791.

== Formation ==
At the time of the Restoration, most of the 7,500-strong army under Charles II's command in Ireland was not formally regimented, remaining so until the 1670s, and contained many Cromwellian veterans of doubtful loyalty. Intending to create an effective and reliable unit for Irish service, Charles II issued the order for the Foot Guards' creation in April 1662.

Leading Royalist James Butler, 1st Duke of Ormond was given the commission to raise the regiment and authority to appoint junior officers; the experienced Anglo-Irish soldier Sir William Flower was made lieutenant-colonel, while Ormonde’s son Richard Butler, 1st Earl of Arran was gazetted colonel, with captaincy of a company. Other commissions were given to members of Ormonde's circle such as Sir Nicholas Armorer and Sir John Stephens of Finglas.

The regiment was initially established at 1,200 men in 12 companies, plus officers; it also included a chaplain, surgeon, drum-major and 24 drummers along with a piper to the "King's Company". A 'Guard of Battleaxes', comprising 50 men plus officers and modelled on the English Yeomen of the Guard, was raised at the same time for ceremonial duties. Many of the Foot Guards' rank and file were raised in England, apparently to minimise Cromwellian influence, with further recruits from the ranks of the Irish “Independent Companies”. Up until 1688 members of the Guards were quartered either in Dublin Castle or in the city gatehouses.

== Early service ==
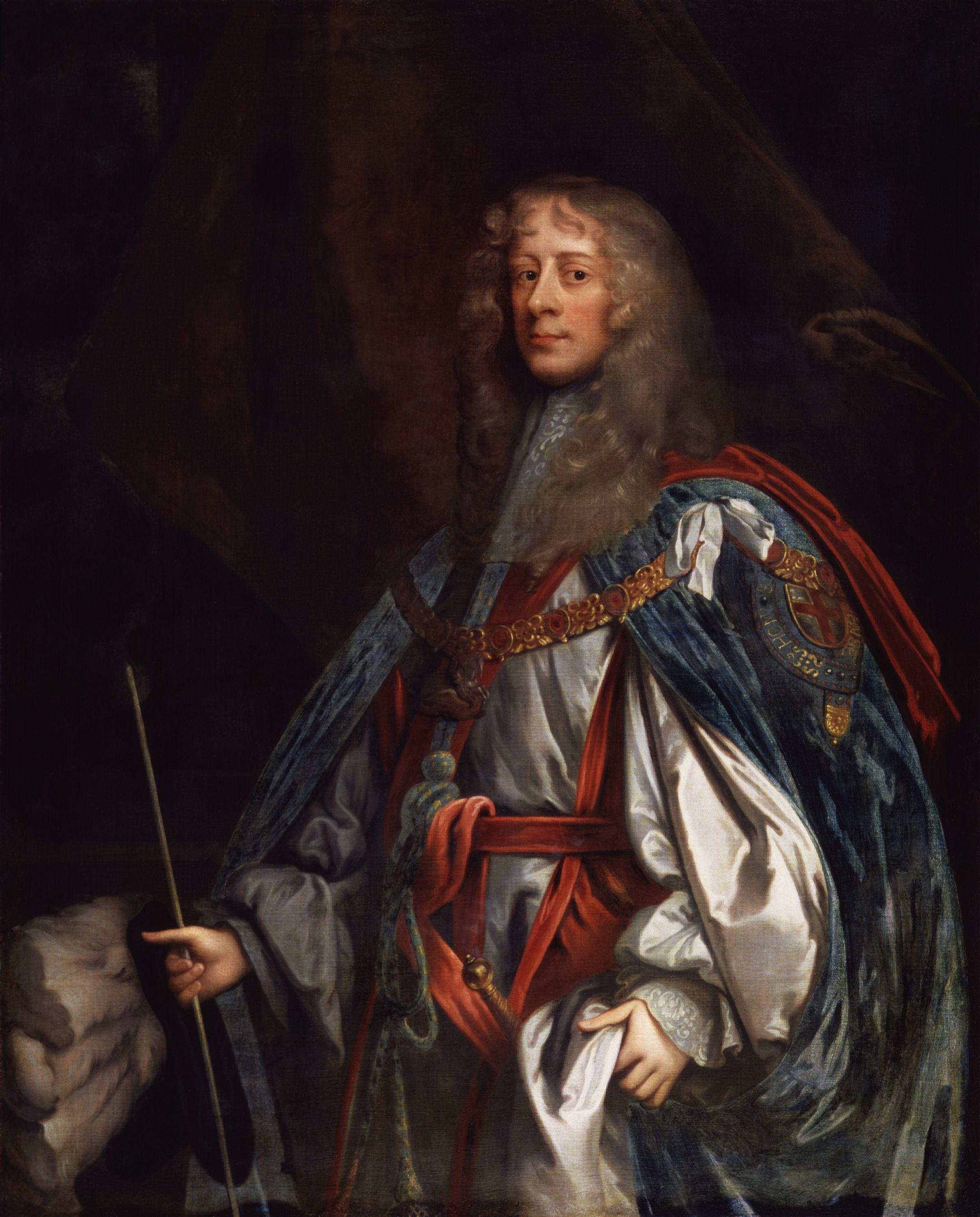
James Butler, Duke of Ormonde, who was given the commission to raise the Foot Guards in 1662

Under Arran, the Guards were employed largely on peacetime duties in Ireland: they were used to suppress a mutiny by other regiments in Carrickfergus in 1666, while in 1673 two companies were ordered to Chester and saw service on board ship during the Third Anglo-Dutch War. Nevertheless the regiment retained a high prestige: a Major Billingsley recorded that "to be a Major of the Royal Regiment of Guards is better and more honourable than to be a Lieutenant-Colonel of any other regiment", while the Lord Lieutenant of Ireland, Clarendon, wrote approvingly of their appearance on parade.

For the first twenty years of its history the regiment was almost exclusively Protestant, with most of its officers drawn from the Irish Protestant gentry. However the 1685 accession of Charles’s Catholic brother James accelerated the recruitment of Catholics, particularly as officers. James's associate Richard Talbot, 1st Earl of Tyrconnell replaced a number of the rank and file, giving the pretext that "the King would have all his men young and of one size"; veteran lieutenant-colonel Sir Charles Feilding was replaced by William Dorrington, an English Catholic. Dorrington continued reforming the regiment, though Clarendon criticised him for recruiting at the Catholic shrine St James's Well, feeling it would harm relations with the Catholic community.

Arran died in 1686 and his nephew James, Lord Ossory, later the 2nd Duke of Ormonde was briefly made colonel of the Guards: at the time of the Glorious Revolution, Ormonde switched his allegiance to William of Orange. He was replaced as colonel by Dorrington and the majority of the regiment stayed loyal to James, although one of its two battalions, sent to England immediately prior to William's landing, was taken prisoner.

The Guards subsequently fought on the Jacobite side in the War in Ireland, including at the Siege of Derry, the Battle of the Boyne and at Aughrim, where their lieutenant-colonel William Mansfield Barker and chaplain Alexius Stafford were killed. Several hundred of their number were among those permitted to leave for France after the Jacobite defeat. Following their departure, there would be no Irish Guards regiment until the formation of the Irish Guards in 1900, although the Viceroy's ceremonial 'Guard of Battleaxes' was maintained into the 19th century.

== French service ==
In France the regiment continued to recruit from among Irish Jacobite exiles, the so-called “Wild Geese”, and saw further service in the Nine Years' War. The terms of the Peace of Ryswick included the disbandment of James’s former army, but the same day as the Guards regiment was broken up, 27 February 1698, it was immediately reconstituted as Dorrington's Regiment in the French Royal Army.

The regiment continued in French service in several campaigns. It fought at Malplaquet, Dettingen and Fontenoy. Dorrington ended his active service in c. 1710 and died in 1718; Michael Roth, who had begun service with the Foot Guards as a lieutenant in 1686, became colonel, followed by his son Charles Edward, Comte de Roth, in 1733. It retained its prestige status, being nicknamed "the Pretender's body-guard". Elements of the regiment returned to Britain during the Jacobite Rising of 1745.

Between 1766 and 1770 the regiment’s colonel was the 9th Earl of Roscommon; its last colonel was Antoine Walsh, also known as the Comte de Walsh-Serrant. In 1791, following the French Revolution, it was merged into the 92nd Infantry Regiment of the French Army. The latter, today, the 92nd is based in Clermont-Ferrand, is considered the last French regiment to descend directly from the regiments of the Irish Brigade.

== American Revolutionary War ==
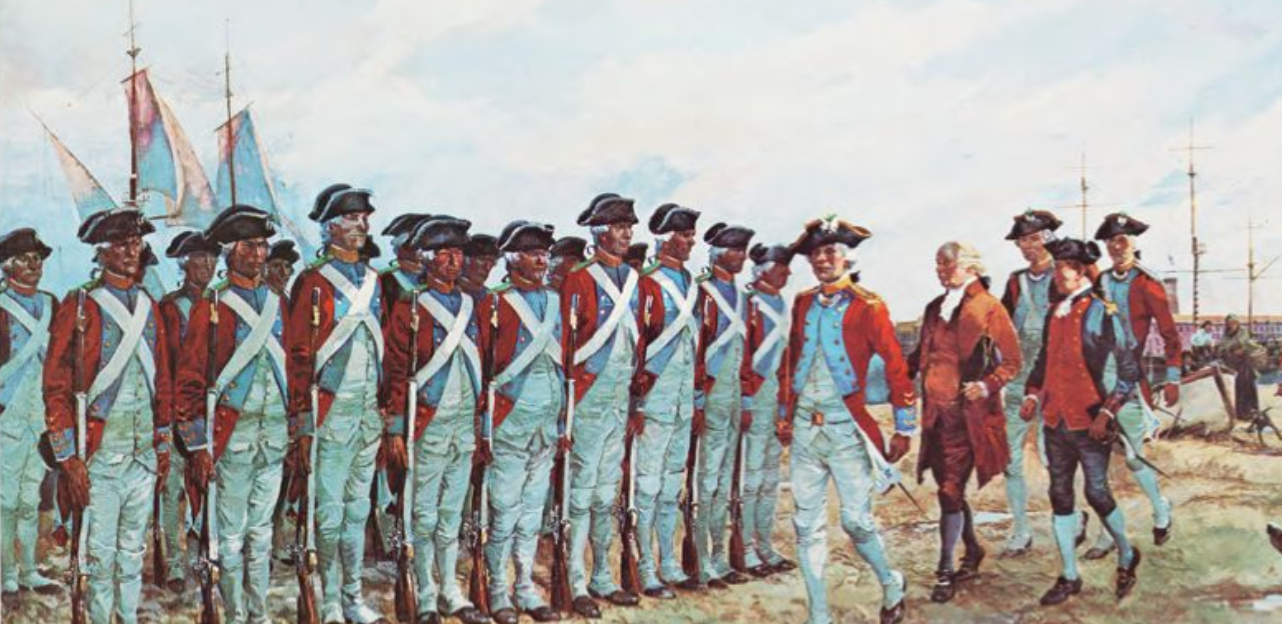
John Adams reviews John Paul Jones' marines from the Walsh Regiment.

A detachment from Régiment de Walsh-Serrant served as marines aboard John Paul Jones ship Bonhomme Richard. When John Adams arrived to Lorient as American Commissioner in 1779, he was given a dinner by Jones and after the dinner he reviewed the ship's marines from the Walsh Regiment. Drafts from the regiment participated in the Siege of Savannah in 1779.

== Uniform and colours ==
Throughout most of its existence, even in French service, the regiment was issued with red coats with blue facings. Its colours, a Saint George's Cross with a central crown surmounted with a crowned lion, reflected its original status as a Guards regiment of the King of England.

== Sources ==
- Childs, John (1980). The Army, James II, and the Glorious Revolution.
- Childs, John (2014). General Percy Kirke and the Later Stuart Army.
- Falkiner, C. Litton (1904). Illustrations of Irish History and Topography. Longmans.
- Kiley, Kevin F. (2021). Artillery of the Napoleonic Wars. Frontline Books.
- Monod, Paul (1993). Jacobitism and the English People, 1688-1788. Cambridge University Press.
- O'Callaghan, John Cornelius (1870). History of the Irish Brigades in the Service of France. Cameron & Ferguson.
- Smith, Charles R. (1975). A Pictorial History, the Marines in the Revolution. Headquarters, U.S. Marine Corps.
- Smith, Geoffrey (2011). Royalist Agents, Conspirators and Spies: Their Role in the British Civil Wars, 1640-1660. Ashgate.
- Tise, Larry A. (1998). The American Counterrevolution. Stackpole Books.
