= Irish Army (1661–1801) =

- Active: 1661–1801
- Country: Kingdom of Ireland
- Type: Army
- Role: Land warfare
- Size: 7,500 (1661) c. 36,000 (1690); 12,000 (1699–1767); 15,235 (1767–1801)

Commanders
- Commander-in-Chief: James Butler, 1st Duke of Ormond (1661–1685); Richard Talbot, 1st Earl of Tyrconnell (1685–1689); Frederick Schomberg, 1st Duke of Schomberg (1689–1690); Godert de Ginkel (1690–1692); Lord Galway (1692–1701); Thomas Erle (1701–1705); Lord Cutts (1705–1707); Richard Ingoldsby (1707–January 1712); William Steuart (1711–1714); Lord Tyrawley (1714–1721); Lord Shannon (1721–1740); Owen Wynne, 1728; Gervais Parker (1740–1750); Viscount Molesworth (1751–1758); Lord Rothes (1758–1767); William Keppel (1773–1774); George Augustus Eliott; Sir John Irwin (1775–1782); John Burgoyne (1782–1784); Sir William Augustus Pitt (1784–1791); George Warde (1791–1793); Lord Rossmore (1793–1796); Lord Carhampton (1796–1798); Sir Ralph Abercromby, 1798; Lord Lake, 1798; Lord Cornwallis (1798–1801)

The Irish Army or Irish establishment, in practice called the monarch's "army in Ireland" or "army of Ireland", was the standing army of the Kingdom of Ireland, a client state of England and subsequently (from 1707) of Great Britain. It existed from the early 1660s until merged into the British Army in 1801, and for much of the period was the largest force available to the British Crown, being substantially larger than the English and Scottish establishments. Initially solely under the monarch's control, from 1699 the army was jointly controlled by the monarch and by the Parliament of England. The Parliament of Ireland took over some responsibilities in 1769, extended after 1782 when it began passing its own Mutiny Acts. The army, funded by Irish crown revenues, had its own Sovereign (the Lord-Lieutenant), its own Commander-in-Chief, its own War Office, its own Paymaster-General, its own Board of Ordnance, and its own artillery, distinct from the British.

For much of the Army's history, only members of the Anglo-Irish Anglican Protestant minority could enlist, while both the Catholic majority in Ireland and Protestant Nonconformists were barred from enlistment. During the reign of the Catholic king James II (r. 1685–1688), Catholics were actively recruited into the army and quickly became a majority within it. When James was overthrown by William of Orange in the 1688 Glorious Revolution, most Irish Army troops stayed loyal to him and fought on the Jacobite side in the Williamite War in Ireland of 1689 to 1691. Following James's defeat, many of these troops went into exile in France, where they became the core of the Irish Brigade (formed in 1690).

After the Williamite victory the new régime rebuilt the army, making it once again a nominally Protestant force, although regular manpower-shortages meant that in practice Catholics were clandestinely enlisted, an arrangement finally legalised in 1778. Its soldiers fought for Britain in the Nine Years' War of 1688–1697, the French and Indian War of 1754–1763, and the American Revolutionary War of 1775–1783. In Ireland itself the Irish establishment had a role in suppressing civil unrest and opposing anti-government movements. Its troops also fought against the United Irishmen insurgents in the Irish Rebellion of 1798, although the establishment left the bulk of the pro-Government fighting to two parallel but separate forces intended for service domestically: the Irish Militia, re-organized in 1793, and the Irish Yeomanry, formed in 1796.

Following the 1800 Acts of Union and their abolition of the Parliament of Ireland, the Irish Army's regiments were placed on the British establishment, although some roles continued to exist separately.

For historical reasons, the modern Irish Army, which originated as the pre-1922 Irish Republican Army, does not trace its lineage from any part of the earlier Irish Army, although the pre-1922 Royal Irish Regiment did, while the 92nd Regiment of the French Army still traces its descent from the Irish Brigade.

== Background ==
Following the Anglo-Norman invasion of Ireland in the late 12th century, large parts of Ireland came under the control of Anglo-Norman lords and the English Crown. This territory became the Lordship of Ireland and the kings of England claimed sovereignty over it as "lords of Ireland". The rest of the island—known as Gaelic Ireland—remained under the control of various native Irish kingdoms and chiefdoms. The English administration, the Anglo-Norman lords and the Irish chiefs each raised their own armies in times of war.

By the 15th century the area of direct English control had shrunk to an area called the Pale, and English rule came under further strain during the rebellion of Thomas FitzGerald, 10th Earl of Kildare in the 1530s. The Fitzgerald family had traditionally been the leading Anglo-Irish lords in the country, serving as Lord Lieutenants. Their rebellion exposed the weakness of Henry VIII's forces in the Lordship, with the rebels securing large gains and besieging Dublin.

In 1542 the Kingdom of Ireland was formally established and Henry VIII of England became King of Ireland. The English then began establishing control over the island. It involved the policy of surrender and regrant, and the colonization of Irish land by Protestant settlers, largely from England. This sparked conflict with various Irish lordships, most notably the Desmond Rebellions and the Nine Years' War. This latter conflict ended in 1603 with English victory over the Irish armies and their Spanish allies. Following the Flight of the Earls (1607), all of Ireland came under the control of the English Crown and its government in Ireland.

=== Wars of the Three Kingdoms ===
During the Scottish Crisis of the early 1640s, Randal MacDonnell, Earl of Antrim was authorized by King Charles I to raise a 'New Irish Army'. Mainly drawn from the Catholic Gaelic inhabitants of Ulster, and mustered at Carrickfergus, it was intended to take part in a landing on the coast of Scotland. However it was rumoured that Charles I planned to lead the New Irish Army against his English Parliamentarian enemies, in the months before the outbreak of the English Civil War. When the Irish Rebellion of 1641 broke out, the traditional Irish Army was too small in size to cope. Many soldiers of the New Irish Army joined the rebels, and soon controlled large swathes of Ireland. In 1642 they established the Irish Catholic Confederacy and an Irish Confederate army.

Large numbers of reinforcements arrived from England in 1642, known as the "English Army for Ireland", to support the Irish Royalists. Scotland sent a Covenanter army to Ulster. Irish Protestants in northwestern Ulster raised their own 'Laggan Army', which was nominally under the command of the Crown, but largely acted independently. The Irish Confederate army fought against these armies, in what became known as the Irish Confederate Wars. The King authorised secret negotiations with the Confederates, resulting in a Confederate–Royalist ceasefire in September 1643. In 1644, a Confederate military expedition landed in Scotland to help Royalists there.

In 1649, a large English Parliamentarian army, led by Oliver Cromwell, invaded Ireland. It besieged and captured many towns from the Confederate–Royalist alliance, and had conquered Ireland by 1653. The remnants of the Royalist Irish army served in exile under Charles II, while Ireland was garrisoned by English republican troops until 1660.

== Restoration ==
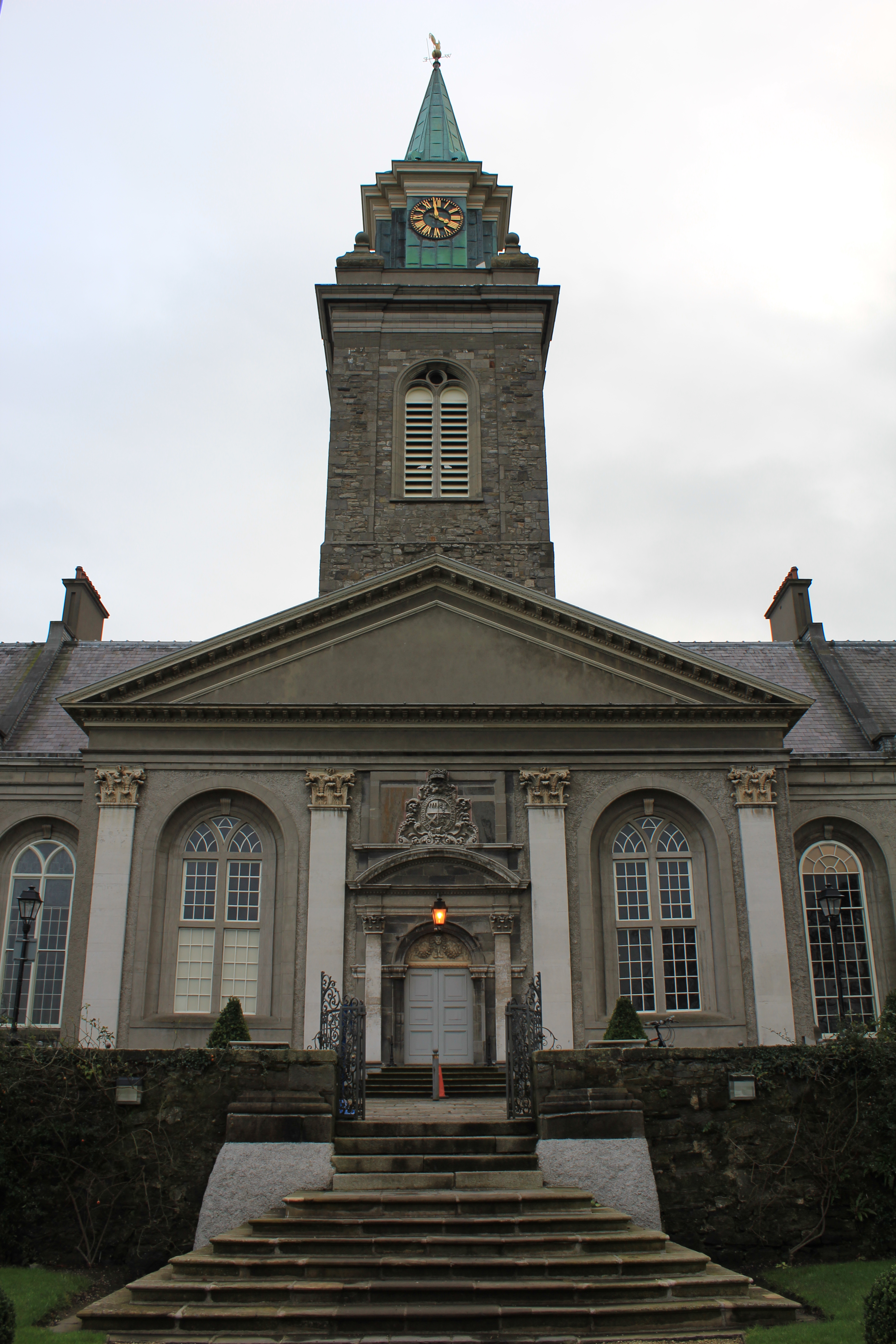
The Royal Hospital Kilmainham was established in 1680 for the welfare of former soldiers.

In 1660 Charles was restored to the Irish throne. While the English New Model Army was quickly disbanded after the Restoration, Charles initially retained the large army still stationed in Ireland. It numbered 5,000 infantry and 2,500 cavalry, considerably bigger than it had been before the rebellion, and was the largest armed force available to Charles in the British Isles. Many of its officers and men were, however, Cromwellian veterans of doubtful loyalty, and in 1661 Charles's newly appointed viceroy, the Duke of Ormonde, began a process of reforming it.

Ormonde's initial step in reorganisation was to raise a 1,200-strong regiment of Foot Guards in April 1662, quartered in Dublin. The experienced Anglo-Irish soldier Sir William Flower was made lieutenant-colonel, while Ormonde's son Richard Butler, 1st Earl of Arran was gazetted colonel, with captaincy of a company. To minimise Cromwellian influence, many of the rank and file were initially raised in England, with further recruits drawn from the ranks of the Irish “Independent Companies”.

In 1672 the remainder of the Irish army was organised into six new regiments of foot, though this was primarily a paper-based exercise as other than the Guards they remained split up in small garrisons around the country. While the Royal Hospital Kilmainham was built for the welfare of soldiers in 1680, the rank and file remained generally poorly paid and equipped; a report of 1676 described the army as "in a most miserable condition". All officers and men serving in Ireland were supposed to produce evidence of being Anglican Protestants, Catholic professional soldiers only being permitted to serve abroad. The dismissal or resignation of former New Model Army veterans meant that many officers were inexperienced Anglo-Irish gentleman soldiers who often embezzled the funds sent by Dublin; by 1676 most men were on extended furlough as there was insufficient money to pay them, with the Foot Guards remaining the only effective unit of the army.

By 1685 and the accession of Charles's Catholic brother James II, the establishment consisted of the Foot Guards; the Earl of Granard's Regiment, based in Roscommon, Longford and Westmeath; Viscount Mountjoy's, based in Tyrone, Armagh and Derry; Sir Thomas Newcomen's, based in Wexford, Tipperary, and King's County; Thomas Fairfax's, based in Antrim and Down; Justin McCarthy's, based in Cork; and Theodore Russell's, based in Galway, Clare and Queens County. There were also three regiments of cavalry; Ormonde's, Tyrconnell's and Ossory's. The Irish army's main duty remained internal security, although two companies of the Foot Guards were deployed as "sea-soldiers" during the Third Anglo-Dutch War: the cavalry's typical duties included escorting merchandise and bullion. During the period there were fears of a revival of republicanism amongst Irish Protestants, and extra troops were stationed around Cork and Ulster. This strategy was broadly successful: at James's accession there was no equivalent Irish rising to the 1685 Monmouth and Argyll rebellions.

== The army under James II ==
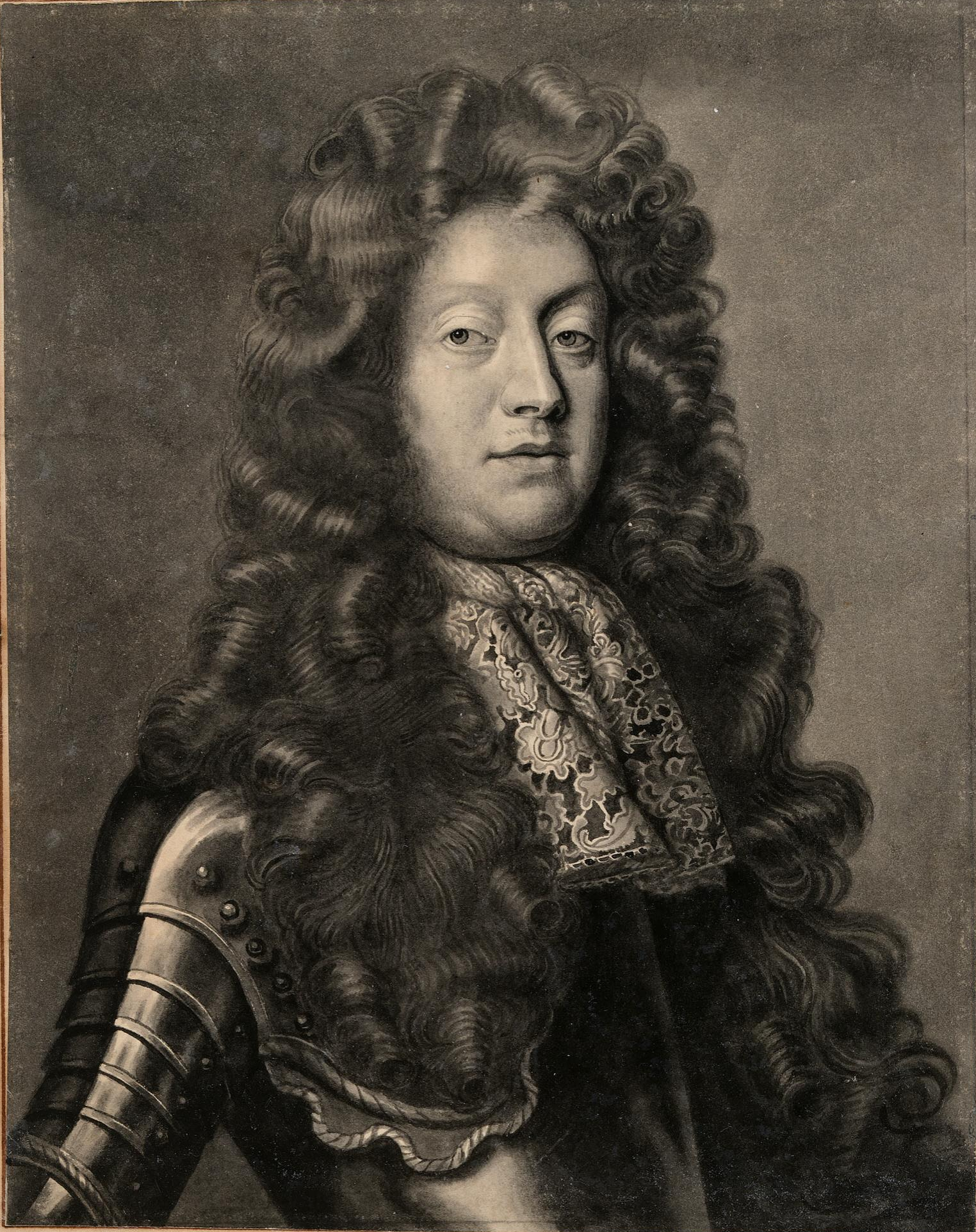
Richard Talbot, 1st Earl of Tyrconnell; appointed head of the army in Ireland by James II in 1685 and Lord Deputy of Ireland in 1687, he increased Catholic recruitment in an effort to create an establishment loyal to James

While recruitment of Catholics into the army had recommenced in the last years of Charles II's reign, James's newly appointed Commander-in-Chief, Richard Talbot, 1st Earl of Tyrconnell, wished to create a Catholic establishment loyal to James and conducted a purge of Protestant army officers, replacing many with Catholics. He also began accelerating recruitment of Catholics into the rank and file, starting with the Foot Guards, giving the pretext that “the King would have all his men young and of one size”. By the summer of 1686, two-thirds of the army's rank and file and 40% of officers were Catholic. Reports received by the viceroy, the Earl of Clarendon, of growing friction between Catholic army units and Protestants began to cause concern both in Ireland and England: Clarendon's secretary noted "the Irish talk of nothing now but recovering their lands and bringing the English under their subjection".

James and Tyrconnell's efforts to promote Catholicism alienated large parts of the British political establishment and in 1688 James was deposed by his Protestant daughter Mary and her husband (and James's nephew) William of Orange, ruling as joint monarchs. James had ordered 2,500 troops of the Irish army, including a battalion each of the Foot Guards, Granard's and Hamilton's regiments, transferred to England in late 1688, crippling Tyrconnell's ability to defend the country; all were disarmed on William's landing in England. Their Catholic personnel were imprisoned on the Isle of Wight before being shipped to the Continent for service with the Emperor Leopold; the remaining Protestant officers and men were incorporated into Granard's Regiment, which as the regiment with the highest proportion of Protestants became the only regiment of the Irish Army to continue in service with William, as the 18th Foot.

With the implications for Ireland uncertain, Irish Protestants launched a rebellion in 1689, forming the Army of the North and declaring William as king, though Tyrconnell was able to retain control of most towns using the remaining units loyal to James. After initially considering reaching a peace settlement with William, Tyrconnell subsequently resolved to hold Ireland for James; in January 1689 he issued warrants for an enormous expansion of the army. As the Catholic gentry realised the profits that could be made raising men for military service, many of the new regiments initially consisted of 30-45 companies, mostly without uniforms and armed with clubs or rusty muskets; neither Tyrconnell's government nor the Irish economy could afford to properly equip or pay such numbers and a team of inspectors, including Patrick Sarsfield, reduced them to more manageable totals. James's Irish army eventually settled at a total of 45 foot regiments, each of 12 line companies and one grenadier company; 8 dragoon regiments; 7 cavalry regiments and a cavalry Life Guard, about 36,000 men strong.

=== The Williamite War ===
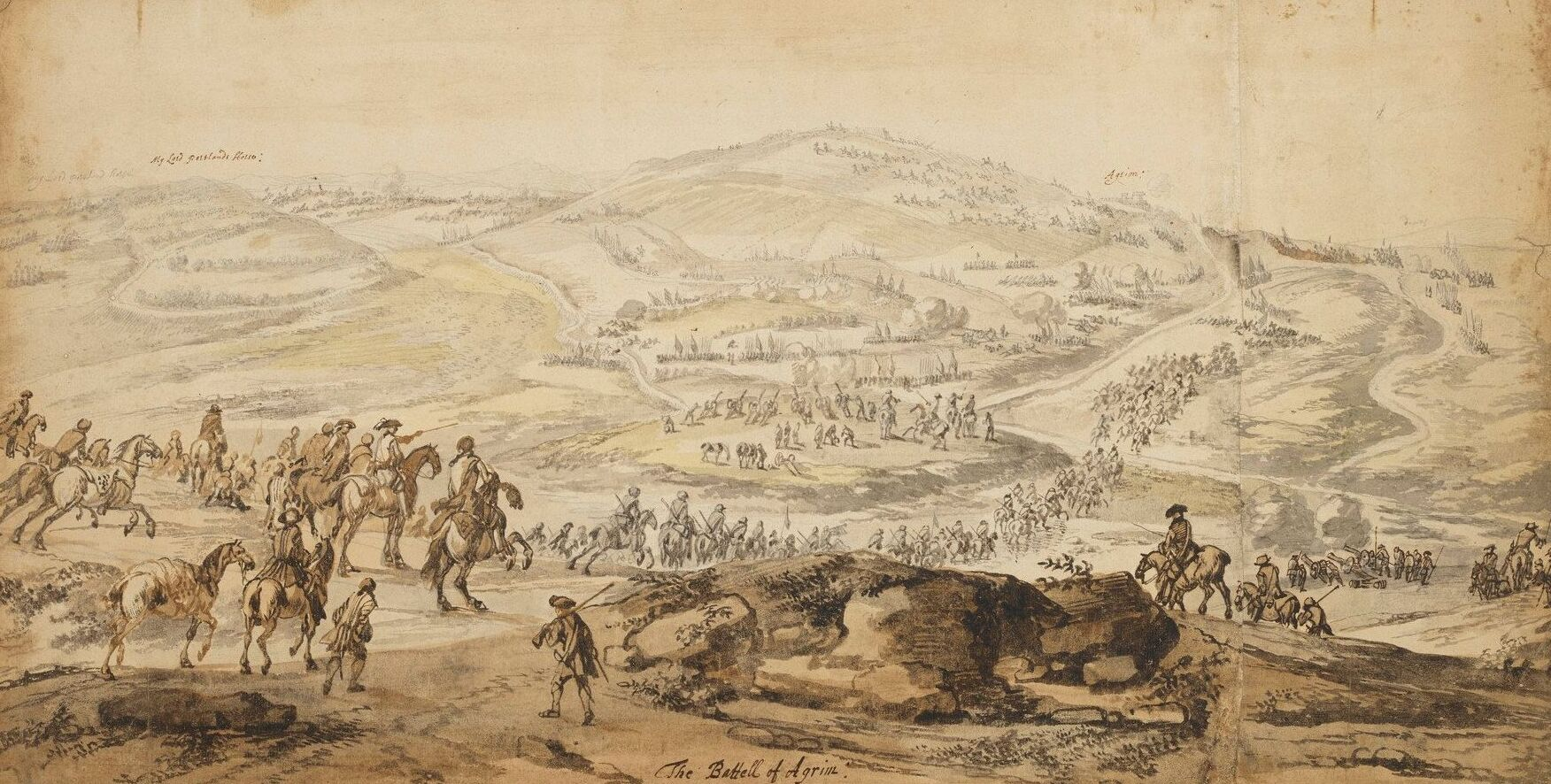
The Battle of Aughrim (1691) was a defeat for James II's Irish Army. Shortly afterwards much of the Army left for France in the Flight of the Wild Geese.

James landed in Kinsale on 12 March, accompanied by French regulars under Conrad von Rosen, along with English, Scottish and Irish Jacobite volunteers, in an attempt to use Ireland as a base to regain all three kingdoms. On 13 August, Schomberg, head of William's main invasion force, landed in Belfast Lough; by the end of the month, he had more than 20,000 men. Carrickfergus fell on 27 August, but an opportunity for Schomberg to quickly end the war by taking Dundalk was missed after his army was crippled by poor logistics, exacerbated by disease.

The ensuing Williamite War was to last two years and claim up to 100,000 civilian and military lives by contemporary estimate. William himself landed in June 1690 bringing substantial reinforcements; James's army was defeated at the Boyne in July, leading to the loss of Dublin, but held off William's advance at the Siege of Limerick in September. With the Jacobites retaining much of western Ireland, both James and William left Ireland in 1690, leaving the war to be handled by subordinates.

In July of the following year the bloodiest battle in Irish history was fought at Aughrim in County Galway; the Irish army's senior commander, French officer Charles Chalmot de Saint-Ruhe was killed and many other officers killed or taken prisoner, dealing a decisive blow to the Jacobite effort. Tyrconnell died of a stroke the following month and Patrick Sarsfield took over as the senior Jacobite negotiator.

=== The Treaty of Limerick ===
In October Sarsfield signed the Treaty of Limerick; the settlement agreed to his demand that those still in Jacobite service could leave for France to serve with the French army. Popularly known in Ireland as the "Flight of the Wild Geese", the process began almost immediately, using English ships sailing from Cork; French ships completed it by December. Modern estimates suggest that around 19,000 men of the Irish army and rapparees, or irregular forces, departed: women and children brought the figure to slightly over 20,000, or about one per cent of Ireland's population at the time. It was reported that some of the soldiers had to be forced on board the ships when they learned they would be joining the French. Most were unable to bring or to contact their families and many appear to have deserted en route from Limerick to Cork.

A separate Irish Brigade had been formed in 1689–90 for French service: the new arrivals from Ireland were eventually incorporated in it but continued the traditions of the old Irish army. While the French, despite a great deal of resistance by James himself, substantially reorganised the force, some individual regiments continued in existence, such as the Grand Prior's Regiment and the Foot Guards, which became Albemarle's and Dorrington's Regiments of the Irish Brigade respectively. They continued to wear the red coat of the Irish Army, leading to occasional confusion when they were fighting against British troops wearing similar attire. Disbanded Jacobites still presented a considerable risk to security in Ireland and despite resistance from the English and Irish parliaments, William encouraged them to enlist in his own forces; by the end of 1693 a further 3,650 former Jacobites had joined William's armies fighting on the Continent.

William reformed the Irish Army, using it as a source of recruits for his international coalition during the Nine Years' War. Though Catholic recruitment was once again forbidden, this proved loosely enforced in practice while manpower was needed and men keen to enlist: a 1697 inquiry found 64 Irish Catholics in a single battalion and 400 in Sir Richard Coote's regiment. Following the Treaty of Ryswick, William planned to maintain a much larger standing army but the Parliament of England responded by passing the 1699 Disbanding Act, intended to prevent William involving the country in Continental wars; this reduced the English army to 7,000 and the Irish to 12,000. The Disbanding Act also insisted on the discharge of all foreigners, such as French Huguenots, from both armies; from 1701 most recruitment in Ireland was also officially prohibited.

== Eighteenth century ==
Through most of the 18th century, parliamentary hostility in England to a large standing army meant that the Irish military establishment continued in use as a means to preserve a cadre of regiments that would otherwise have been disbanded. This was achieved by keeping them at a lower than usual operational strength while in Ireland, then recruiting up to full strength before deployment abroad in times of war. "Irish" regiments could at any time be transferred to another establishment, or transferred abroad while remaining on the Irish establishment, although they then ceased to be a charge on the Irish Exchequer. The anomalous situation was emphasised by the fact that they were technically forbidden from recruiting rank and file in Ireland until 1756, although routinely ignored during manpower crises. The expense and difficulty of recruiting in Britain regularly led to staff officers clandestinely enlisting Irish Catholics, or attempting to pass Irish Protestants off as Scots: the nationality test did not apply to officers, among whom the Anglo-Irish were disproportionately represented in both the Irish and British establishments.

By 1767, British ministers wanted to increase the size of the peacetime army, but faced parliamentary resistance to any attempt to expand the British establishment. The "Augmentation crisis" resulted in an increase in the Irish army being proposed instead; the British parliament accordingly raised the cap on the Irish establishment from 12,000 to 15,235, while in 1769 a statute of the Irish parliament committed to maintaining the "augmentation" of the additional 3,235 troops.

The inequities of the situation were among the main drivers of the early Irish Patriot movement in the mid 18th century; it was pointed out that Ireland was "obliged to support a large [...] military establishment" primarily for the benefit of Great Britain, while still being subject to restrictions on trade.

=== French and Indian War ===
The British government drew on regiments on the Irish establishment for the Braddock Expedition to Fort Duquesne at the opening stages of the French and Indian War. The 44th and 48th foot were quickly dispatched from Ireland and suffered heavy casualties at the disastrous engagement at the Monongahela. Both regiments continued to serve throughout the war taking part in the more successful expedition against Havana before returning home in 1763 for service again in Ireland.

=== American War of Independence ===
Following the outbreak of rebellion in Britain's Thirteen Colonies in 1775, Ireland provided large numbers of recruits to the expanded British Army. Following a vote in the Irish Parliament, it was agreed that a number of Irish Army regiments be allowed to serve in America. This led to concerns that Ireland was not properly defended once France entered the war in 1778, having sent so many soldiers abroad. A spontaneous movement established the Irish Volunteers, committed to the defence of the island against invasion. Despite this, the Volunteers rapidly emerged as a political movement demanding greater powers be granted to Ireland by London, which eventually led to the Constitution of 1782. Amongst its many measures, this gave the Irish Parliament greater control over its own armed forces.

=== Rebellion of 1798 ===
In the 1790s the Army was described as "not fit for purpose". This came at a time of growing support for the republican ideas of the French Revolution, amidst fears of the revolutionary spirit spreading to Britain and Ireland.

== Amalgamation ==
The Irish Army was amalgamated into the British Army following the Acts of Union 1800. By this stage the traditional ban on Irish Catholics serving in the army had been completely removed, and they began to supply a growing portion of troops.

== See also ==
- Commander-in-Chief, Ireland
- Military history of Ireland
