= 92nd Infantry Regiment (France) =

- 92^{e} régiment d'infanterie
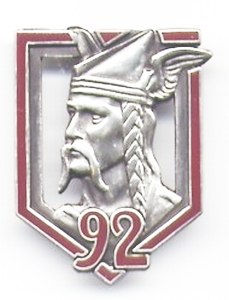
- Regimental badge
- Active: 1661 — present
- Country: France
- Branch: French Army
- Type: Mechanised infantry
- Garrison/HQ: Clermont-Ferrand, Auvergne-Rhône-Alpes
- Nickname: The Gauls
- Mottos: Debout soldats d'Auvergne, debout ça va barder! À moi...! Auvergne... ! ("Stand-up, soldiers of Auvergne, stand-up, it will be tough! To me! Auvergne!")
- Engagements: Napoleonic Wars: Battle of Rivoli; Battle of Austerlitz; Battle of Jena; French conquest of Algeria: Siege of Constantine; World War I: First Battle of Ypres; Battle of Verdun; Battle of the Somme; Battle of Soissons; World War II: Battle of France; Battle of Dunkirk; Cold War; War in Afghanistan; Opération Chammal; Operation Barkhane

Insignia
- Regimental flag

The 92nd Infantry Regiment is a unit of the French Army. Tracing its descent from a unit of Irish troops in French service established in 1661, it received its regimental number in 1790. Since 1881 the unit has been garrisoned at Clermont-Ferrand in Auvergne-Rhône-Alpes. The regiment fought at the battles of Verdun and the Somme in the First World War and in the Battle of France in 1940. The unit was revived in 1944 as a unit of the Maquis. In recent years it has served on Opération Chammal in Iraq and on Operation Barkhane in Chad and Mali.

The 92nd Regiment currently serves in the mechanised infantry role and is equipped with the Véhicule blindé de combat d'infanterie.

== History ==
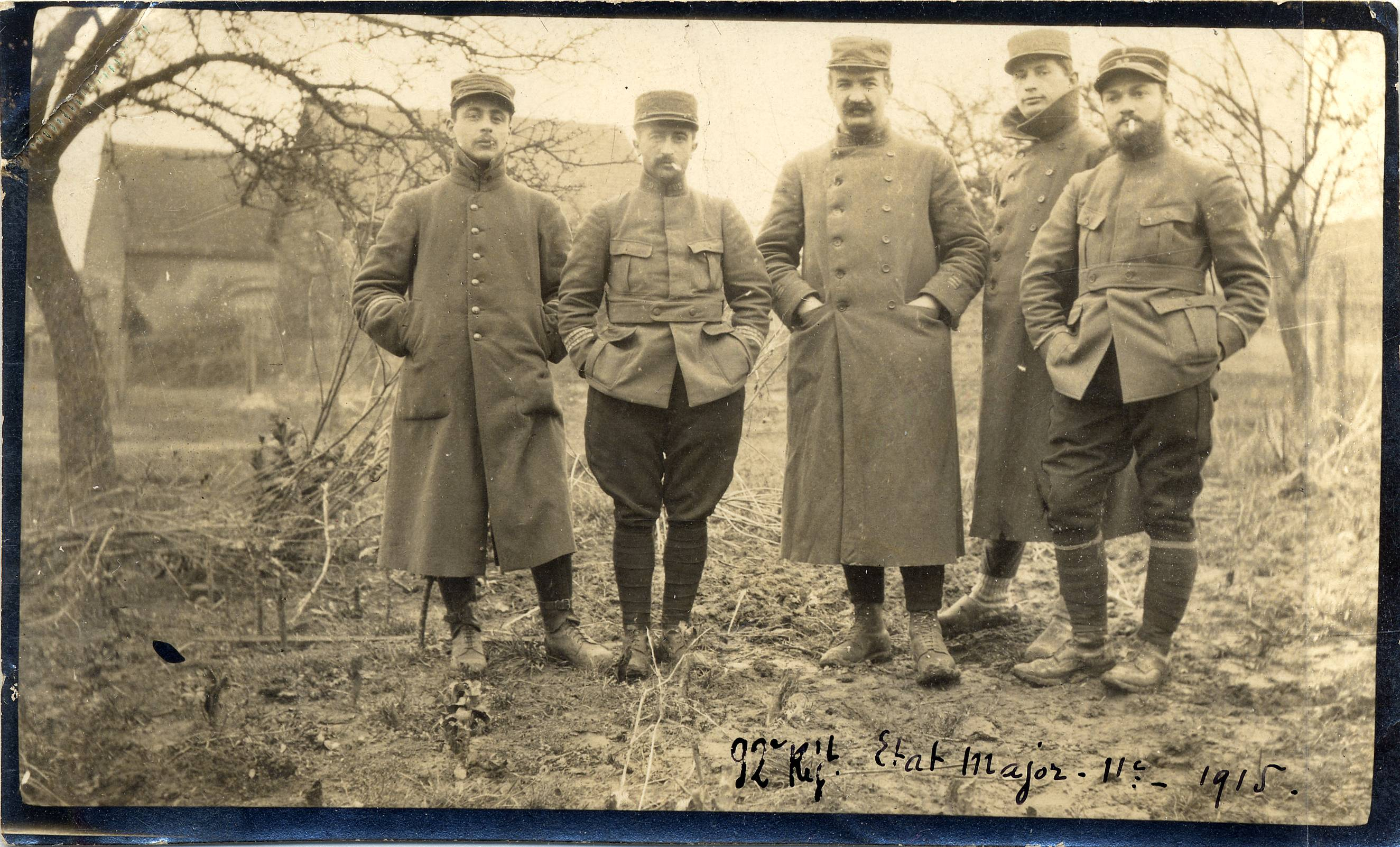
Regimental staff in 1915

The 92nd Infantry Regiment traces its descent from the Royal Irish Regiment of Foot Guards, a unit raised in Ireland in 1661 by Charles II of England and which went into French service in 1698. The regiment received its numerical designation in 1790 and has been garrisoned at Clermont-Ferrand in Auvergne-Rhône-Alpes since 1881. The 92nd Regiment fought at the battles of Verdun and the Somme in the First World War. Throughout the First World War, it served as part of the 26th Infantry Division in the 13th Army Corps.

In 1933 future French president Georges Pompidou served in the regiment as a second lieutenant. The regiment was part of the 25th Motorized Division at the start of the Second World War. It suffered heavy losses in the 1940 Battle of France and their flag was lost in the sinking of the French destroyer Siroco off Dunkirk on 31 May. The unit was re-established in 1944 from a group of Maquis operating in Auvergne.

The 92nd Regiment deployed during the War in Afghanistan and built the bell tower at the Tora Bora base. The unit successfully petitioned for permission to relocate the tower back to France before handing the base over to the Afghan National Army.

The 92nd Regiment was the first equipped with the Véhicule blindé de combat d'infanterie to be deployed to Mali in 2013. It has deployed as part of Opération Sentinelle, the post-2015 security assistance provided by the army in France. In 2017 the 92nd Regiment deployed on Opération Chammal in Iraq, from 2018 to 2019 was on Operation Barkhane in Chad and in 2020 deployed on the same operation to Mali. In September 2021 a detachment of 600 men of the regiment were deployed to Mali and to Lebanon.

== Structure ==
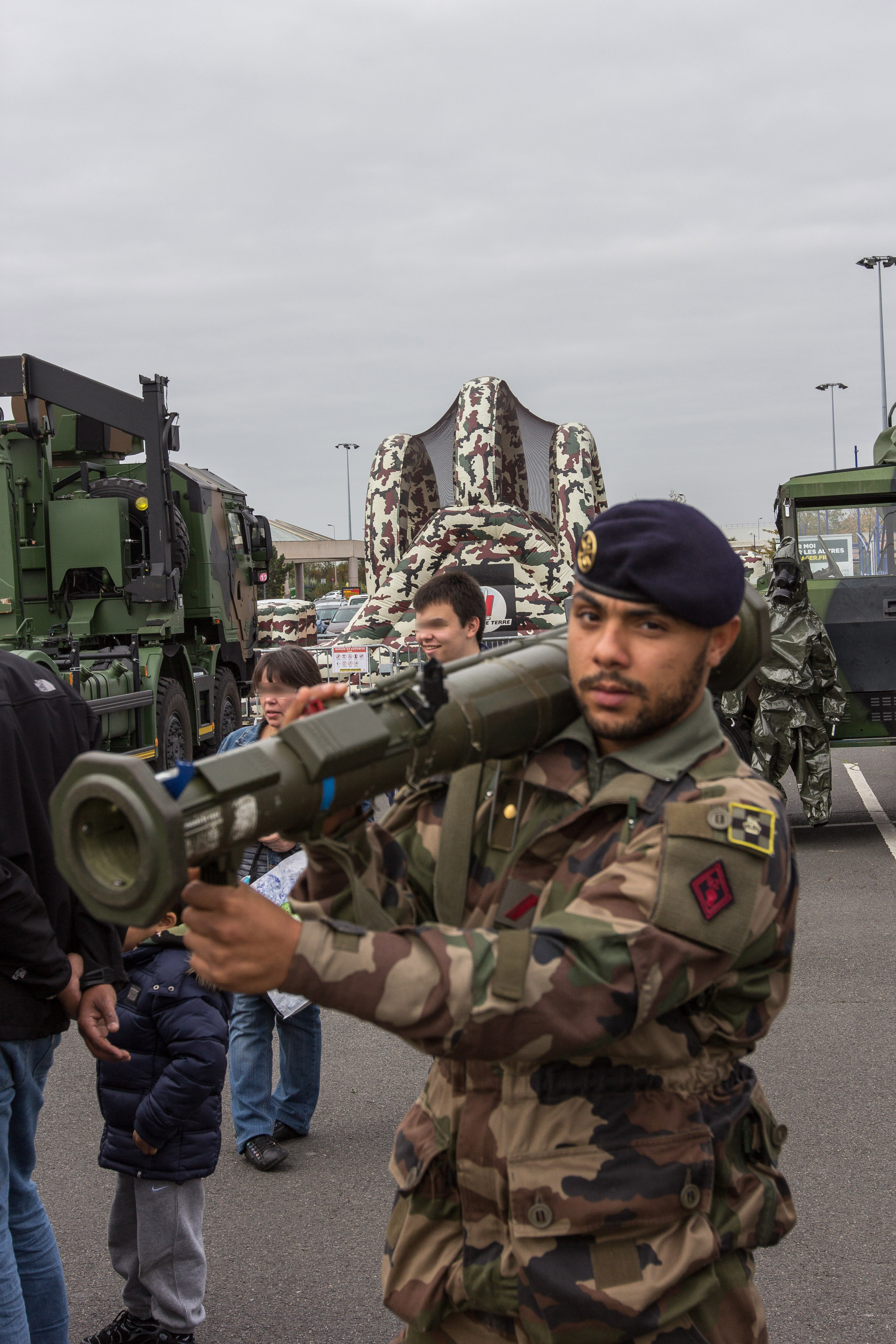
A soldier of the regiment in 2014

The 92nd Regiment is currently part of the French Army's 2nd Armoured Brigade. It amounts to 1,500 personnel in five combat companies, a support company, a command and logistics company and two reserve companies.

Its equipment includes:

- 968 x Heckler & Koch HK416 assault rifles
- 110 x FN Minimi light machine guns
- 54 x MAG58 general purpose machine guns
- 10 x LLR 81mm mortars
- 14 x MILAN anti-tank missile launchers
- 58 x Petit Véhicule Protégé 4x4 light armoured vehicles
- 30 x Poste Eryx anti-tank equipped armoured personnel carriers
- 96 x Véhicule blindé de combat d'infanterie
- 10 x Masstech unarmoured vehicles
- 56 x Renault GBC 180 trucks

== Honours ==
The 92nd Regiment has received the following battle honours:

- Rivoli 1797
- Austerlitz 1805
- Jena 1806
- Constantine 1837
- Ypres 1914
- Verdun 1916-1917
- The Somme 1916
- The Ourcq 1918

The regimental flag also bears the wording "Honneur et Patrie" and the Croix de Guerre 1914-1918 with three palms. The regimental insignia shows a Gaul's head on a silver shield with red enamel edging from which the members of the regiment are known as Gauls (French: Gaulois). The garrison is near to Gergovie which is associated with the victory of Gallic chief Vercingetorix over the Romans at the Battle of Gergovia. The regimental motto is "Debout soldats d'Auvergne, debout ça va barder! À moi...! Auvergne... !" (French for "Stand-up, soldiers of Auvergne, stand-up, it will be tough! To me! Auvergne!") which comes from words spoken by Nicolas-Louis d'Assas, of the Auvergne Regiment, at the Battle of Kloster Kampen in 1760.
