= Basil Hamilton =

Scottish Jacobite; British MP (1696–1742)

The Right Honourable Basil Hamilton

Member of Parliament for Kirkcudbright
- In office 1741–1742
- Preceded by: Patrick Heron
- Succeeded by: John Maxwell

Personal details
- Born: 8 September 1696
- Died: 14 November 1742 (aged 46)
- Spouse: Isabella Mackenzie
- Relations: William Hamilton, Duke of Hamilton (grandfather); Anne Hamilton, 3rd Duchess of Hamilton (grandmother); William Cochrane, 7th Earl of Dundonald (nephew)
- Children: 4, including Dunbar Douglas, 4th Earl of Selkirk
- Parent(s): Lord Basil Hamilton; Mary Dunbar

Basil Hamilton (8 September 1696 – 14 November 1742) was a Scottish Jacobite.

== Early life ==
He was the second son of Lord Basil Hamilton and Mary Dunbar, granddaughter and heiress of Sir David Dunbar, 1st Baronet, of Baldoon. His elder brother, William Hamilton, succeeded their father but died unmarried before November 1703, after which the Baldoon estate passed to Basil. His sisters were Eleanor Hamilton (wife of John Murray of Philiphaugh) and Catherine Hamilton (wife of Thomas Cochrane, 6th Earl of Dundonald).

His father was the sixth son of William Hamilton, Duke of Hamilton and Anne Hamilton, suo jure Duchess of Hamilton. His maternal grandfather was David Dunbar the Younger of Baldoon.

== Career ==
During the Jacobite rising of 1715 he commanded a troop of horse under Thomas Forster and was taken prisoner at the Battle of Preston. He was sentenced to death in 1716, but reprieved through the influence of his uncle Lord Orkney. His estates were forfeited, but successfully claimed by his mother, and the forfeiture was reversed in 1733.

In 1734, he unsuccessfully stood as the Duke of Buccleuch's candidate for Dumfries Burghs. He advised against another Jacobite uprising in 1739. In 1741 he was returned to Parliament for Kirkcudbright, but died the following year.

== Personal life ==
In c. 1719, Hamilton was married to Isabella Mackenzie (died 1725), a daughter of Elizabeth (née Paterson) Mackenzie (a daughter of Kenneth Mackenzie of Suddie) and Col. Hon. Alexander Mackenzie (a son of Kenneth Mackenzie, 4th Earl of Seaforth). Together, they had two sons and two daughters, including:

- Mary Hamilton (1720–1750), who married Ranald Macdonald of Clanranald.
- Elizabeth Hamilton (born 1721), who died young.
- Dunbar Hamilton (1722–1799), who succeeded as the 4th Earl of Selkirk in 1744 and resumed the name of Douglas.
- Basil Hamilton, who died young.

His wife died on 6 April 1725. Hamilton died on 14 November 1742.

Parliament of Great Britain
Preceded by Patrick Heron	Member of Parliament for Kirkcudbright Stewartry; 1741–1742	Succeeded by John Maxwell
