= St Mary's Isle Priory =

Scottish monastic institution

St Mary's Isle Priory was a monastic house of Augustinian canons located on the Isle of Trail or St Mary's Isle in Galloway.

== The Prioratus Sanctae Mariae de Trayl ==
It is alleged Fergus, First Lord of Galloway (1138), granted then St. Maria de Trayl, (St. Mary's Isle) to the Monks of Holyrood Abbey, (The Abbot of Sancte Crusis) as confirmed by John, Bishop of Galloway, at the beginning of the thirteenth century. Fergus, having his principal seat on Palace Isle, Loch Fergus, erected the ‘Prioratus Sanctae Mariae de Trayl’ (St. Mary's Isle Priory) in penitence for rebellion against King David I of Scotland. Whether or not the endowment was made for this purpose, Holyrood Abbey established a daughter house there which is on record by the time of a grant by Lochlann, Lord of Galloway sometime between 1189 and 1193. A "prior of Galloway" by the name of "William" appeared alongside the Abbot of Holywood and his prior in a document preserved by St Andrews Cathedral Priory dated to 1173, and so it is possible that this William is the earliest recorded Prior of St Mary's Isle.

The priory maintained its dependent relationship with Holyrood Abbey. In order to help maintain the canons and prior of the monastery, in 1323 King Robert I of Scotland granted to Holyrood Abbey a tithe of the revenues from royal pleas taken from the area between the rivers Nith and Cree. The declining health of the priory, related more generally to the declining fortunes of monasteries in Scotland in the 15th century, led James IV of Scotland to seek its reincorporation into Holyrood Abbey. This only led to a kinsman of the abbot of Holyrood becoming Prior of St Mary's Isle. In the 16th century control of the priory was secularized and held by a series of Commendators.

The Prior of St Mary's Isle, like others, had a seat in Parliament, Robert Strivelin being the last prior. After his death, Robert Richardson was presented to the Priory on 30 March 1538. The declared rental at the general assumption of 1561 represents that the Priory was worth £235.4.4. in money, "in meale, oats, bear - 90, 80 and 77 bushels respectively, and that the kirks thereof were Kirkmadyne with St. Mary's Isle called Galtway. In 1572, Mr. Robert Richardson, as Usufructuary, and William Rutherford, as Commendator, granted to James Lidderdale (c. 1545–1621), and Thomas (1570–1629), his son, the lands which belonged to the Priory, and formally became part of their entirely secular lordship in 1608, this grant was confirmed by a charter from the King, dated the 4th November 1573."

== St. Mary’s Isle: The Wadset ==
The succession of Lidderdale of St. Mary's Isle, as given, is from a genealogical deduction made by James Lorrimer, Lyon Clerk, on 30 January 1851, as corrected. It is from James Lidderdale (c1545-1621) to Thomas (1570–1629) to Thomas (1590–1636), who d.s.p., to his brother James (1590–1665), to his son Robert (1610–1652), to his son Thomas Lidderdale (1630–1687).

In the year 1672, THOMAS LIDDERDALE (1630–1687) then proprietor of St. Mary's Isle, mortgaged his lands by wadset, as perfected by livery of sasine, and granted possession, or right to possession characteristic of estates of freehold, to Sir David Dunbar of Baldoon (c1610–1686). The St Mary's Isle wadset passed with Sir David's lands, in Kirkcudbright, to his sole heir and granddaughter, Mary Dunbar of Baldoon (1677–1760) who married, in 1691, Lord The Hon. Basil Hamilton. Lord The Hon. BASIL HAMILTON (c1671-1701), the sixth son of Sir William Douglas-Hamilton, 1st Earl of Selkirk (1646) and Anne Douglas (Hamilton), married Mary Dunbar of Baldoon, by whom they had two sons, William who died young and Mr. Basil, inheriting the Estate.

BASIL HAMILTON of Baldoon (c1696-1742), married Isabella Mackenzie, on 14 March 1719, by whom they had two sons Basil Hamilton, who died young, and Dunbar Hamilton, born on 1 December 1722. DUNBAR HAMILTON, eldest son of Basil Hamilton of Baldoon, resumed the name of DOUGLAS, the paternal one of his family, upon his succeeding to the honours of Earl of Selkirk, in 1744. It was therefore about then that possession of St Mary's Isle was obtained by Lord Selkirk, The 4th Earl, who was seen to gradually add to the St Mary's Isle Estate. In 1786 he transferred management of his estates to his then eldest son, Basil William, The Lord Daer, who conducted his affairs with great success. Dunbar, 4th Earl of Selkirk, died in 1799, and was succeeded by his youngest son Thomas, his other sons having predeceased him, as the 5th Earl of Selkirk.

In 1811, the heir or heirs of Thomas Lidderdale (1630–1687) having gone abroad, a Robert Lidderdale, given the St Mary's Isle wadset clauses, attempted to exercise the right to call on Lord Selkirk, The 5th Earl, to accept the conditions of the wadset, and to deliver up the Estate. "I would wish you to have the friendly goodness to have the Register of Edinburgh to be searched as to this wadset, which can easily be done from the alphabetical list year 1672 to 1700. Any expense you may incur, I will thankfully repay and must beg this application be considered as most confidential. Under the impression of this wadset Lord Selkirk and his heirs may hold the Estate ad finitum, but surely the existing presumptive heir can recall it on payment until a more rightful, heir casts up." (Signed) R. LIDDERDALE, by Langtoun, 14 March 1811.

== St. Mary’s Isle: The Foreclosure ==
This attempting to undo a wadset from 1672, as agreed to by Thomas Lidderdale (1603–1687,) dealt with indifferently by the direct-line of male Lidderdales, was not the first reconsideration of the Estate. A Captain William Robertson Lidderdale (1747–1814) near the end of his life set out to prove that there had been some legal flaw when the wadset was foreclosed. Seeking the support of James Lidderdale (1786–1878), James being a leading solicitor in Galloway, he claimed that the ‘purchase’ was carried out in the absence of the owners and therefore illegal. This against the financial indifference of his deceased father, John Lidderdale (1713–1777), he having been a wealthy man by reason of the £50,000 amassed trading in slaves and tobacco, had not sought to redeem the wadset, and so recover the Estate. As then head of the family this was his right in Scots law, instead he purchased Castle Milk, now owned by the head of the Jardines, as well as buying Estates in Yorkshire and Berwick.

This was not the first Lidderdale ‘of means’ to not seek to redeem the wadset, as James Lidderdale (1670–1708), son of Thomas Lidderdale (1630–1687), saw in his son, Thomas (born c1690). Like many other Lidderdales, Young Thomas in the West Indies, making a fortune, on what is called a Spanish voyage, did not direct the freeing of the Isle, with his money, though he may have died intestate, his money going to his sister. There is nothing to show his fortune, or any part of it went to a male Lidderdale, the Estate of St. Mary's Isle being much burdened, was said to be 'sold' to Lady Mary Hamilton (Dunbar) (c1677 - 1760).

It is also known that Thomas Lidderdale (1630–1687) took on "One wadset followed another to the Hamiltons, to Herons and to Baldoon. Land had become of no value, some of the farms lying waste and offered at the church door to whoever would pay a small Kane and the taxes. He thus has to part with the Isle, the last of his several possessions." Mrs. Alexa M.Carter (1865–1953) of Edinburgh, states, "I do not know much of family affairs but my father, William Halliday Lidderdale (1815-1896) returning, somewhat peeved, from Lard Selkirk's (Dunbar James 1885) funeral quite clearly stated that the Isle passed from our family owing to the foreclosure of the wadset, this I believe". Her father also stated that his father, James Lidderdale (1786–1878), was too badly off to have joined with Captain William Robertson Lidderdale (1745–1814) of Gretna Hall, in going to law, she knowing Captain William had written to her grandfather James Lidderdale (1786–1878), he being a leading solicitor in Galloway.

== The Peninsula of St Mary's Isle ==
The peninsula of St Mary's Isle on which the Priory stood lies in the estuary of the River Dee South of Kirkcudbright. It divides the bays of Manxman's Lake and Goat Well Bay. The tidal Islet of Inch lies just offshore in Manxsman's Lake. The pleasure grounds, in which is situated the residence, are nearly surrounded by the sea and River Dee.

All the buildings of the Priory were swept away towards the close of the 17th century, to give full scope for beautifying the ground as a noble demesne. The mansion house has nothing striking to necessitate delineation, though its monument room (library) burned, in a fire of 1941. The property passed through Captain John Hope RN, to the Hope Dunbar line, who still hold it. CAPTAIN JOHN HOPE Royal Navy (1843–1915), the eldest son of The Hon. CHARLES HOPE (1808 –1893) and Lady Hope (Lady Isabella Ellen Dunbar), took on title of St Mary's Isle in 1893, with the death of his mother. Retiring early from the Navy, having been Captain of The FLY 4, he succeeded his mother (Lady Isabella) in the large properties she had earlier inherited from her brother, DUNBAR JAMES DOUGLAS The 6th Earl of Selkirk in 1885.

St Mary's Isle is noted in 'local histories' for the short visits of John Paul Jones and poet Robert Burns to the then Selkirk mansion house. Robert Burns is said to have spoken the "Selkirk Grace" whilst visiting Lord Daer at St Mary's Isle. On 22 April 1778, John Paul Jones made a descent on St Mary's Isle, with the view of seizing The 4th Earl of Selkirk as a hostage during the war with America. His lordship being absent, all the silver plate in his mansion was seized and carried away. After the war Paul Jones had, the silver valued, paid the men their share out of his own pocket, and returned the silver to the Selkirks. It survived intact until 1941, when most was lost in a fire at St. Mary's Isle.

== See also ==
- Prior of St Mary's Isle, for a list of priors and commendators

== Bibliography ==
- Cowan, Ian B. & Easson, David E., Medieval Religious Houses: Scotland With an Appendix on the Houses in the Isle of Man, Second Edition, (London, 1976), pp. 96–7
- Watt, D.E.R. & Shead, N.F. (eds.), The Heads of Religious Houses in Scotland from the 12th to the 16th Centuries, The Scottish Records Society, New Series, Volume 24, (Edinburgh, 2001), pp. 193–7
