= John Kennedy, 7th Earl of Cassilis =

Scottish peer

The Right Honourable The Earl of Cassillis PC

Treasurer of Scotland
- In office 1689–1695 Serving with William, Earl of Crawford, John, Earl of Tweeddale, David, Lord Ruthven, Hon. Alexander Melville

Personal details
- Born: John Kennedy; November 1653
- Died: 23 July 1701 (aged 47)
- Spouse(s): Lady Susannah Hamilton (m. 1668; died 1694) Mary Fox (m. 1697; died 1701)
- Children: 6
- Parent(s): John Kennedy, 6th Earl of Cassilis; Lady Margaret Hay

John Kennedy, 7th Earl of Cassillis, PC (November 1653 – 23 July 1701) was a Scottish peer.

== Early life ==
He was the son of John Kennedy, 6th Earl of Cassillis and the former Lady Margaret Ker (née Hay). His father was the grandson of Gilbert Kennedy, 4th Earl of Cassillis, and nephew of John Kennedy, 5th Earl of Cassillis. Before his parents' marriage, his mother was the wife of Henry Ker, styled Lord Ker, son of Robert Ker, 1st Earl of Roxburghe, and his father was married to Jean Hamilton, a daughter of Thomas Hamilton, 1st Earl of Haddington.

His maternal grandparents were William Hay, 10th Earl of Erroll and Lady Anne Lyon (a daughter of Patrick Lyon, 1st Earl of Kinghorne and Anne Murray).

== Career ==
He succeeded to the titles of 9th Lord Kennedy and 7th Earl of Cassillis on 22 September 1668. He was one of the commission exercising the office of Treasurer of Scotland between 1689 and 1695. He was appointed Privy Counsellor of Scotland to King William II in 1689.

On his death, his titles went to his grandson, as his first son, Lord Kennedy, had predeceased him. Kennedy was a keen freemason, belonging to the Kilwinning Lodge.

== Personal life ==
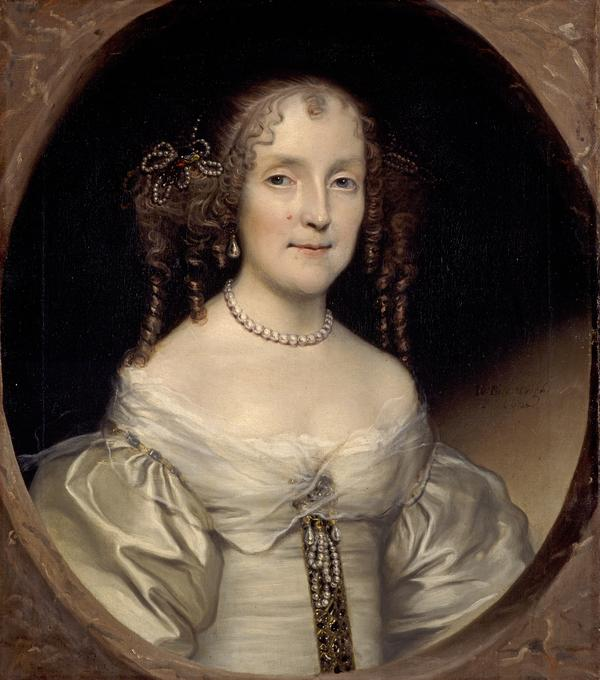
Portrait of his first wife, Lady Susannah Hamilton, by John Michael Wright

On 26 December 1668, Lord Cassillis married Lady Susannah Hamilton (1632–1694), a daughter of James Hamilton, 1st Duke of Hamilton and the former Lady Margaret Feilding. They had three children:

- John Kennedy, Lord Kennedy (c. 1672–1700), who married Elizabeth Hutchinson, in 1697.
- Anne Kennedy (bef. 1679–1699), who married John Hamilton, 1st Earl of Ruglen, son of William Hamilton, Duke of Hamilton and Anne Hamilton, 3rd Duchess of Hamilton, after 1694.

On 27 February 1697 or 1698, Lord Cassillis was married to Mary Fox, the daughter of John Fox and Mary Weld. They had three children:

- Hon. James Kennedy (1701–1759)
- Lady Elizabeth Kennedy (b. 1701)
- Lady Mary Kennedy (b. 1701)

Lord Cassillis died on 23 July 1701 and was succeeded in his titles and estates by his grandson, John.

=== Descendants ===
Through his eldest son, he was a grandfather of John Kennedy who became the 8th Earl of Cassillis. On the death of his grandson, the 8th Earl, without male issue, a competition arose, both for the estates and for the title of Earl of Cassillis, between William, Earl of March and Ruglen, heir general, and Sir Thomas Kennedy of Culzean, 4th Baronet, the heir male. The Court of Session found the right to the estates to be in the latter, 29 February 1760; and the same was found with regard to the title on a reference to the House of Lords, 27 January 1762.

Peerage of Scotland
Preceded by John Kennedy	Earl of Cassilis; 1668–1701	Succeeded by John Kennedy
