= Lord Basil Hamilton =

Scottish aristocrat

Lord Basil Hamilton (1671 – 27 August 1701) was a Scottish aristocrat who drowned trying to save his servant.

== Early life ==
Hamilton was baptized on 16 December 1671 at Hamilton, South Lanarkshire. His was the sixth son of William Hamilton, Duke of Hamilton and Anne Hamilton, suo jure 3rd Duchess of Hamilton. Among his siblings were Lt. Gen. James Hamilton, 4th Duke of Hamilton, Lady Catherine Hamilton (wife of John Murray, 1st Duke of Atholl), Charles Douglas, 2nd Earl of Selkirk, John Hamilton, 1st Earl of Ruglen and 3rd Earl of Selkirk, George Hamilton, 1st Earl of Orkney, Lady Susan Hamilton (wife of John Cochrane, 2nd Earl of Dundonald and John Hay, 3rd Marquess of Tweeddale), Lady Margaret Hamilton (wife of James Maule, 4th Earl of Panmure), and Lord Archibald Hamilton.

== Career ==
Upon his marriage to Mary Dunbar, he presided over the Baldoon estate, south west of Wigtown, Dumfries and Galloway, Scotland, south of the River Bladnoch.

On 27 August 1701, while traveling with his brother and some friends, they found the Minnick Water at Larg in Galloway in high flood. Lord Basil's servant "entered the water to try the ford, and was carried away by the torrent, and Lord Basil, in attempting to save him, was drowned."

== Personal life ==
Hamilton was married to Mary Dunbar, a daughter of David Dunbar the Younger of Baldoon and, his second wife Lady Eleanora Montgomerie (fourth daughter of Hugh Montgomerie, 7th Earl of Eglinton). David's first wife was Janet Dalrymple (a daughter of James Dalrymple, 1st Viscount of Stair), who is well known as "the heroine of Sir Walter Scott's story of The Bride of Lammermoor. Mary was the granddaughter and heiress of Sir David Dunbar, 1st Baronet, of Baldoon. Together, they were the parents of four children:

- Catherine Hamilton (c. 1692–1779), who married Thomas Cochrane, 6th Earl of Dundonald
- Eleanor Hamilton (c. 1694–1783), who married John Murray of Philiphaugh
- William Hamilton (? – c. 1703), who died unmarried
- Basil Hamilton (1696–1742), who married Isabella Mackenzie, granddaughter of Kenneth Mackenzie of Suddie

After Lord Basil's death on 27 August 1701, he was succeeded in his estates by his eldest son William. As William died unmarried before November 1703, the Baldoon estate passed to his second son, Basil, who was returned as MP for Kirkcudbright in 1741.

Lady Mary Hamilton was one of the Jacobites required to forfeit estates in 1715. She died at Edinburgh at age eighty-six in 1760 and was buried at Holyrood on 22 May 1760.

=== Descendants ===
Through his second son Basil, he was posthumously a grandfather of Dunbar Hamilton, who inherited the earldom of Selkirk in 1744.
