= Thomas Cochrane, 6th Earl of Dundonald =

Scottish peer

The Right Honourable The Earl of Dundonald

Personal details
- Born: Thomas Cochrane; 1702
- Died: 28 May 1737 (aged 34–35); Paisley Abbey
- Spouse: Catherine Hamilton (m. 1727)
- Relations: James Graham, 2nd Marquess of Montrose (grandfather)
- Children: William Cochrane, 7th Earl of Dundonald
- Parent(s): William Cochrane; Lady Grizel Graham

Thomas Cochrane, 6th Earl of Dundonald (1702 – 28 May 1737) was a Scottish peer.

== Early life ==
Cochrane was born in 1702. He was the second but only surviving son of William Cochrane of Kilmaronock, MP for Wigtown Burghs, and the former Lady Grizel Graham.

His paternal grandparents were William Cochrane, Lord Cochrane and his wife Lady Katherine Kennedy (a daughter of John Kennedy, 6th Earl of Cassilis). His maternal grandparents were James Graham, 2nd Marquess of Montrose and the former Lady Isabel Ker (widow of Robert Ker, 1st Earl of Roxburghe, and fifth daughter of William Douglas, 7th Earl of Morton).

== Career ==
Upon the death of his unmarried cousin, William Cochrane, 5th Earl of Dundonald, in 1725, he inherited the earldom of Dundonald.

== Personal life ==
In October 1727, Lord Dundonald was married to Catherine Hamilton (d. 1779), the second daughter of Lord Basil Hamilton of Baldoon (sixth son of William Hamilton, Duke of Hamilton and Anne Hamilton, suo jure Duchess of Hamilton) and the former Mary Dunbar (a daughter of David Dunbar the Younger of Baldoon, who was the granddaughter and heiress of Sir David Dunbar, 1st Baronet, of Baldoon). Together, they were the parents of:

- William Cochrane, 7th Earl of Dundonald (1729–1758), who was killed during the Siege of Louisbourg.
- Hon. Basil Cochrane (d. 1748), who served in the Royal Navy.
- Lady Katherine Cochrane (d. 1776), who married William Wood of Nether Gallowhill.
- Lady Charlotte Cochrane (d. 1740).

Lord Dundonald died at Paisley Abbey on 28 May 1737, and was succeeded in his titles by his eldest son, William. His widow died on 13 April 1779. On the death of his unmarried heir in 1758, his line died out and the title was inherited by his son's second cousin, Thomas Cochrane.

Peerage of Scotland
Preceded by William Cochrane	Earl of Dundonald; 1725–1737	Succeeded by William Cochrane
