= Jean, Lady Kennedy =

Jean, Lady Kennedy (died 1767) was a Scottish noblewoman. She was the daughter of Captain Andrew Douglas of Mains, Dunbartonshire, and the wife of Sir John Kennedy, 2nd Bt of Culzean, Ayrshire.

Lady Kennedy gave birth to twenty children, but fourteen of them died at a young age.

She married John Kennedy, heir to the baronetcy of Cullean (Culzean), on 28 March 1705. Their first child was born on 26 November 1706, but many of their children died in infancy. Their surviving children included:

- Sir John Kennedy of Culzean, 3rd Baronet (died 1744)
- Thomas Kennedy, 9th Earl of Cassillis (1726-1775)
- David Kennedy, 10th Earl of Cassillis (died 1792)
- Elizabeth Kennedy, who married Sir John Cathcart, 2nd Baronet, as his second wife, and had children.
- Anne Kennedy (c.1743-), who married John Blair of Dunskey and had children.

Their second son, Thomas, inherited the baronetcy after the death of his elder brother in 1744, and inherited the earldom of Cassillis following the death of John Kennedy, 8th Earl of Cassilis, in 1759. On 29 February 1760, the Court of Session found the right to the estates to be his, and the House of Lords awarded him the title on 27 January 1762. Following the death of David Kennedy in 1792, the baronetcy became extinct but the earldom passed to a distant relative.

The Kennedy family had Jacobite sympathies, and was traditionally involved in smuggling, an activity that continued after the earldom of Cassilis passed into the family. The earl's mother is said to have moved out of Culzean Castle in 1753 because she disapproved of his plans to improve the house and estate.

Scipio was eventually given his freedom, but remained with the family as Lady Kennedy's personal servant. He was left property in her will, and continued in the service of her sons after her death.
