= Anne Hamilton, 2nd Countess of Ruglen =

Scottish noblewoman (1698–1748)

Anne Hamilton, 2nd Countess of Ruglen and Countess of March (5 April 1698 – 21 April 1748), was a suo jure Scottish peeress.

== Early life ==
Lady Anne was born in Cramond, Scotland on 5 April 1698. She was the daughter of John Hamilton, 1st Earl of Ruglen (c. 1664–1744), and his wife Lady Anne Kennedy. Her uncle, John Kennedy, Lord Kennedy, predeceased his father, and Anne's first cousin, John Kennedy, became the 8th Earl of Cassilis in 1701.

Her maternal grandparents were John Kennedy, 7th Earl of Cassilis and, his first wife, Lady Susannah Hamilton (a daughter of James Hamilton, 1st Duke of Hamilton).

== Peerage ==
The title Earl of Ruglen in the Peerage of Scotland, along with the subsidiary titles Viscount of Riccartoun and Lord Hillhouse, were created on the 14th of April, 1697, for her father Lord John Douglas-Hamilton, fourth (third surviving) son of William Douglas-Hamilton, Duke of Hamilton, 1st Earl of Selkirk, and his wife Anne Hamilton, 3rd Duchess of Hamilton. As her only brother, William, Lord Daer, died in 1742, upon her father's death in 1744, Anne succeeded to the title Countess of Ruglen suo jure.

== Personal life ==
She married William Douglas (c. 1696–1731), who inherited the earldom of March in 1705. Their son:

- William Douglas, 4th Duke of Queensberry (1724–1810), who inherited the earldom of March from his father in 1731 and the earldom of Ruglen from his mother in 1748, but in 1778 inherited the dukedom of Queensberry from a cousin, Charles Douglas. He never married, but had an illegitimate daughter who inherited much of his wealth and became Maria Seymour-Conway, Marchioness of Hertford.

Shortly before her own death, she remarried, her second husband being Anthony Sawyer, Esq, who held the position of Paymaster to the King's forces in Scotland. There were no children from this second marriage.

Peerage of Scotland
Preceded by John Douglas-Hamilton	Countess of Ruglen; 1744–1748	Succeeded by William Douglas
