= John Hamilton, 3rd Earl of Selkirk =

Scottish nobleman and Master of the Mint

Arms of John Hamilton, 3rd Earl of Selkirk, 1st Earl of Ruglen

John Hamilton, 3rd Earl of Selkirk, 1st Earl of Ruglen (bapt. 26 January 1664/5 – 3 December 1744), known as Lord John Hamilton until 1697, was a Scottish nobleman.

He was the third surviving son of William Douglas, Earl of Selkirk and his wife Anne Hamilton, 3rd Duchess of Hamilton (who was Duchess of Hamilton in her own right). His father, the son of William Douglas, 1st Marquess of Douglas, adopted the Hamilton surname and arms.

Lord John Hamilton was one of 11 children. His elder brothers were James Hamilton, 4th Duke of Hamilton, Charles Douglas, 2nd Earl of Selkirk, and his younger brothers were George Hamilton, 1st Earl of Orkney, Lord Basil Hamilton, and Lord Archibald Hamilton.

On 14 April 1697, he was created Earl of Ruglen, Viscount of Riccartoun and Lord Hillhouse in the Peerage of Scotland by William III of England. He served as Master of the Mint but was deprived of his post because of his opposition to the government.

In 1739, his elder brother the Earl of Selkirk died, and he inherited the Selkirk title and some of his lands.

== Marriage and issue ==
In 1694, Lord John married his cousin Lady Anne Kennedy, daughter of John Kennedy, 7th Earl of Cassilis. They had three children:

- William Hamilton (1696 – 20 February 1742), styled Lord Riccartoun until 1739 and then Lord Daer. He served in the Scottish army. He died apparently unmarried at Edinburgh, aged 45, "having got a chill after being overheated with dancing".
- Lady Anne Hamilton (1698–1748), who succeeded her father as Countess of Ruglen, and married her cousin William Douglas, 2nd Earl of March
- Lady Susan Hamilton (1 November 1699 – 8 February 1763), married in 1738 her cousin John Kennedy, 8th Earl of Cassilis. She died without children.

The Earl married secondly, at Edinburgh, on 22 March 1701, Elizabeth Hutchinson Kennedy, the daughter of Charles Hutchinson of Owthorpe, Nottinghamshire, and widow of John, Lord Kennedy, his first wife's eldest brother.

She died in 1734. In 1744, he died in Edinburgh, aged 79, and was buried at Cramond.

The Earldom of Selkirk, which could only pass through the male line, was inherited by his great-nephew, the grandson of his brother Lord Basil. His eldest daughter, Lady Anne Hamilton, succeeded as Countess of Ruglen. Her only son, William Douglas, 4th Duke of Queensberry, became the 3rd Earl of Ruglen but died childless, and the earldom became extinct.

Peerage of Scotland
New creation	Earl of Ruglen; 1697–1744	Succeeded by Lady Anne Hamilton
Preceded by Charles Douglas	Earl of Selkirk; 1739–1748	Succeeded by Dunbar Douglas
