= Hope-Dunbar baronets =

Baronetcy in the Baronetage of Nova Scotia

The Dunbar, later Hope-Dunbar Baronetcy, of Baldoon, is a title in the Baronetage of Nova Scotia. It was created on 13 October 1664 for David Dunbar, with remainder to his heirs male and tailzie. The baronetcy became dormant on his death in 1686. The title remained dormant until 1916, when it was successfully claimed by Charles Hope-Dunbar, who became the sixth Baronet. He was a descendant of Mary, granddaughter and sole heiress of the first Baronet. Hope-Dunbar was also the grandson of the Hon. Charles Hope, third son of John Hope, 4th Earl of Hopetoun. Consequently, the present holder of the baronetcy is also in remainder to the earldom of Hopetoun and its subsidiary titles the viscountcy of Aithrie, lordship of Hope and baronetcy of Kirkliston, titles held by his kinsman the Marquess of Linlithgow.

== Dunbar of Baldoon (1664–1686), Later Hope-Dunbar of St. Mary's Isle (1916) Baronets ==
Escutcheon of the Dunbar baronets of Baldoon

- Sir David Dunbar of Baldoon, 1st Baronet (1610–1686), son of Archibald Dunbar, was born in Baldoon, in Wigtownshire. He gained the title of 1st Baronet, of Baldoon (Nova Scotia) on 13 October 1644, with special remainder, as inheritable, to the heirs male 'of his body' and to 'his heirs succeeding him in his lands'. On his death, his baronetcy became dormant, as without surviving male issue. Sir David appears to have been sympathetic to the Presbyterian cause at the time of the Bothwell Rising in 1679, but by 1685, he was involved, like other moderate Presbyterians, in pressing the November 1664 Abjuration Oath against the Society-People. Through apparent loyalty to the regime, his portfolio of estates, which included the Lands of the Glenkens, expanded in Galloway. At some point after 1682, he acquired Glengap in Twynholm Parish, and the lands of Kilsture in Kirkinner Parish. Mary Dunbar, his granddaughter, and heiress, later carried the estates by marriage, to Lord Basil Hamilton.
  - Mary Dunbar of Baldoon (1677–1760), married Lord Basil Hamilton (1671–1701), son of the Duke and Duchess of Hamilton; they were parents of
  - William Hamilton of Baldoon (died 1703), brother of
  - Basil Hamilton of Baldoon (1696–1742), father of
  - Dunbar Douglas, 4th Earl of Selkirk (1722–1799), father of
  - Thomas Douglas, 5th Earl of Selkirk (1771–1820), father of
  - Dunbar Douglas, 6th Earl of Selkirk (1809–1885). His heiress was his sister
  - Lady Isabella Helen Douglas (1811–1893), married Charles Hope (1808–1893), son of the 4th Earl of Hopetoun; they were parents of
  - John Hope of St Mary's Isle (1843–1915).
- Sir Charles Dunbar Hope-Dunbar of St. Mary's Isle, 6th Baronet, (1873–1958), successfully claimed the title in 1916, only son of Captain John Hope of St. Mary's Isle and Rebecca Marion Blackburn, was given the name of Charles Dunbar Hope at birth, and on 1 June 1916 his name was legally changed to Charles Dunbar Hope-Dunbar. Sir Charles was educated at King William's College, on the Isle of Man, and at the Royal Military Academy, Woolwich. He fought in the Boer War and in the First World War, gaining the rank of Major in the Royal Field Artillery.
- Sir Basil Douglas Hope-Dunbar of St. Mary's Isle, 7th Baronet (1907–1961), was the son of Sir Charles Dunbar Hope-Dunbar and Edythe Mary Ramsden. He was educated at Eton College, in Berkshire and then at Royal Military College, Sandhurst. Sir Basil fought in the Second World War, gaining the rank of Major in the Queen's Own Cameron Highlanders, seeing service in India.
- Sir David Hope-Dunbar of St. Mary's Isle, 8th Baronet (born 13 July 1941), is the son of Sir Basil Douglas Hope-Dunbar and Evelyn Diana Fraser. Sir David was also educated at Eton College, and later attended Royal Agricultural College, Cirencester, in Gloucestershire.

The heir apparent to the baronetcy is Charles Hope-Dunbar of St. Mary's Isle, younger (born 1975).

== See also ==
- Marquess of Linlithgow
- Baron Rankeillour
- Baron Glendevon
