= David Kennedy, 10th Earl of Cassilis =

Scottish peer

David Kennedy, 10th Earl of Cassillis (bef. 1734 – 18 December 1792), was a Scottish peer, the third son of Sir John Kennedy, 2nd Baronet by Jean Douglas.

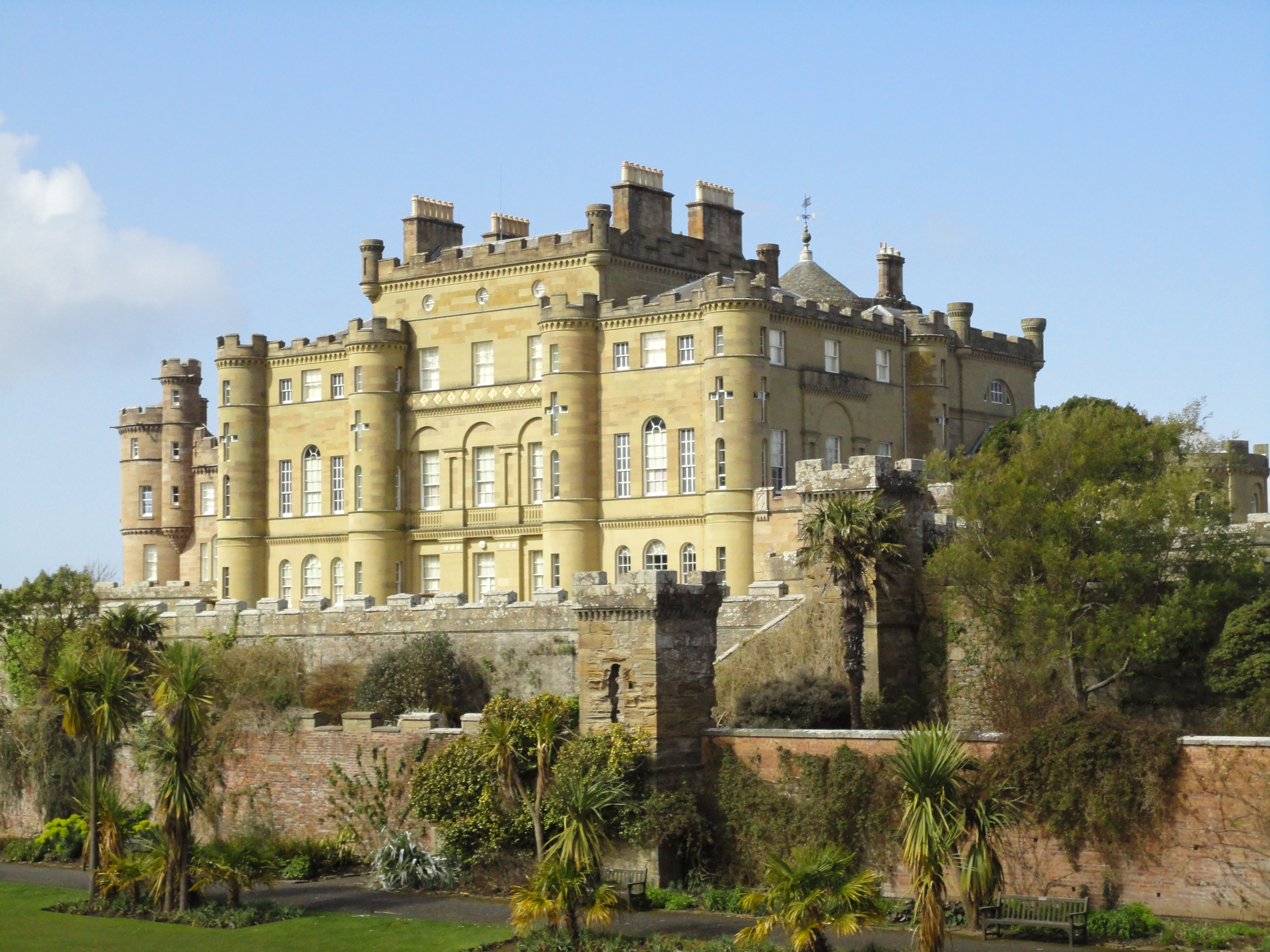
Culzean Castle

He succeeded to the titles of 10th Earl of Cassillis, 12th Lord Kennedy and 5th Baronet Kennedy on 30 November 1775 on the death of his elder brother Thomas, the 9th Earl, who had died without male issue. He held the office of Scottish representative peer from 1776 to 1790. It was the 10th Earl who ordered the rebuilding of Culzean Castle on the Ayrshire coast.

Lord Cassillis never married, and the baronetcy became extinct on his death; the other titles passed to a distant cousin, Archibald Kennedy, 11th Earl of Cassillis, who lived in New York.

Parliament of Great Britain
Preceded by Archibald Montgomerie	Member of Parliament for Ayrshire; 1768–1774	Succeeded by Adam Fergusson
Peerage of Scotland
Preceded by Thomas Kennedy	Earl of Cassilis; 1775–1792	Succeeded by Archibald Kennedy
Baronetage of Nova Scotia
Preceded by Thomas Kennedy	Baronet (of Culzean); 1775–1792	Extinct
