= Charles Douglas, 2nd Earl of Selkirk =

Scottish aristocrat and courtier

The Right Honourable The Earl of Selkirk PC
- Arms of Lord Selkirk

Governor of Edinburgh Castle
- In office 1737–1738
- Preceded by: The Earl of Orkney
- Succeeded by: The Lord Ross

Representative Peer for Scotland
- In office 1722–1739
- In office 1713–1715

Lord Clerk Register
- In office 1733–1739
- Preceded by: The Earl of Marchmont
- Succeeded by: The 3rd Marquess of Lothian
- In office 1696–1702
- Preceded by: Sir Thomas Burnett, Bt
- Succeeded by: The Lord Philiphaugh

Personal details
- Born: Lord Charles Hamilton; 3 February 1663
- Died: 13 March 1739 (aged 76); London, England
- Relations: James Hamilton, 1st Duke of Hamilton (grandfather); William Douglas, 1st Marquess of Douglas (grandfather); James Hamilton, 4th Duke of Hamilton (brother)
- Parent(s): William Douglas, 1st Earl of Selkirk (father); Anne Hamilton, 3rd Duchess of Hamilton (mother)

Charles Douglas, 2nd Earl of Selkirk, PC (born Lord Charles Hamilton; 3 February 1663 – 13 March 1739) was a Scottish aristocrat and courtier.

== Early life ==
Hamilton was born 3 February 1663. He was the third, but second surviving, son of William Hamilton, Duke of Hamilton (formerly known as William Douglas, Earl of Selkirk) and Anne Hamilton, suo jure Duchess of Hamilton. Among his siblings were James Hamilton, 4th Duke of Hamilton, Catherine Murray, Duchess of Atholl, John Hamilton, 1st Earl of Ruglen and 3rd Earl of Selkirk, George Hamilton, 1st Earl of Orkney, Susan Hay, Marchioness of Tweeddale, Margaret Maule, Countess of Panmure, Lord Basil Hamilton and Lord Archibald Hamilton.

His mother was the daughter of James Hamilton, 1st Duke of Hamilton and Lady Mary Feilding (a daughter of the 1st Earl of Denbigh and the former Lady Susan Villiers, sister to the 1st Duke of Buckingham). His father was the eldest son of the 1st Marquess of Douglas by his second wife, Lady Mary Gordon (a daughter of the 1st Marquess of Huntly).

In 1682, he was sent with a tutor to France, where he was joined two years later by his elder brother James, Earl of Arran, whom he accompanied to the army of the king of France then besieging Luxembourg.

== Career ==
On 20 November 1688, he was appointed colonel of the 1st Regiment of Horse in place of his brother, James, but was removed the following month. He was a supporter of the Revolution of 1688, attending William III at the Battle of the Boyne in 1690 and on several of the Continental campaigns. In November 1699, he was appointed to carry letters of condolence on the death of King Christian V of Denmark, but did not go.

He served as a Lord of the Bedchamber from 1689 to 1702 for William III and, again, from 1714 until his death in 1739 for George I and George II. He was Burgess of Edinburgh in c. 1692. He served as Lord Clerk Register from 1696 to 1702 and, again, from 1733 until his death in 1739. He was a Lord of the Scottish Treasury from 1704 to 1705. He was a Sheriff-Principal of Lanarkshire and strongly opposed the Union between Scotland and England, but was a Representative Peer for Scotland from 1713 to 1715 and, again, from 1722 until his death in 1739. He was made Privy Council of Great Britain in 1733 and served as Governor of Edinburgh Castle from 1737 to 1738.

=== Estates and peerage ===
On 4 August 1646, before his parents' marriage, his father was created the Lord Daer and Shortcleuch and Earl of Selkirk, with remainder to his heirs male whatsoever bearing the name of Douglas. After their marriage, he was created Duke of Hamilton in 1660 on the petition of his mother, also receiving several of the other Hamilton peerages for life. His father then resigned the Lordship of Daer and Earldom of Selkirk into the King's hands, who conferred them by novodamus dated 6 October 1688 with the precedency of 1646 upon William's younger son, Charles and his four younger brothers, John, George, Basil and Archibald, respectively in tail male. There was a proviso that if Charles, or any of his brothers, or the heirs male of their bodies should succeed to the dukedom of Hamilton that, in such case the Earldom shall always descend to the brother immediately junior to him. (Note: This proviso, however, never came into effect as far as these younger brothers were concerned, the dukedom having ever since remained in the line of the eldest brother and his issue, while the issue male of all the younger ones became extinct in 1885 with the death of the 6th Earl of Selkirk. The earldom of Selkirk passed to Charles Douglas-Hamilton, 7th Earl of Selkirk, the younger son of William Hamilton, 11th Duke of Hamilton. After the 7th earl's death in 1886, the earldom passed to his elder brother, William Douglas-Hamilton, 12th Duke of Hamilton. After his death in 1895, the earldom passed to his cousin, Alfred Douglas-Hamilton, 13th Duke of Hamilton. Upon the 13th duke's death in 1940, the earldom passed to his younger son, George Douglas-Hamilton, who became the 10th earl.)

In 1693, his parents settled the estates of Crawford Douglas and Crawford John on him. Upon his father's death on 18 April 1694, he succeeded to the Lordship of Daer and Earldom of Selkirk. On his assumption of the title, the Earl dropped the name of Hamilton and resumed his patronymic of Douglas.

== Personal life ==
Lord Selkirk died, unmarried, (Note: Luttrell's Brief Relations claims Lord Selkirk married Anne Scott, 1st Duchess of Buccleuch, shortly before 10 August 1703, but no other evidence of such a marriage has been recorded.) in London on 13 March 1739 and was succeeded in the earldom by his younger brother, John. His nephew William, Lord Riccartoun was his executor. He was buried on 18 April 1739 in the vault of the Duke of Buckingham in Henry VII Chapel at Westminster Abbey.

Peerage of Scotland
Preceded by William Douglas-Hamilton	Earl of Selkirk; 1694–1739	Succeeded by John Hamilton
