= Dunbar Douglas, 4th Earl of Selkirk =

Scottish peer

The Right Honourable The Earl of Selkirk FRSE

Scottish representative peer
- In office 1787–1799
- Succeeded by: The Earl of Galloway

Personal details
- Born: Dunbar Hamilton; 1 December 1722
- Died: 24 June 1799 (aged 76)
- Spouse: Helen Hamilton (m. 1758)
- Relations: Lord Basil Hamilton (grandfather)
- Parent(s): Isabella Mackenzie; Basil Hamilton
- Education: University of Glasgow

Dunbar Hamilton Douglas, 4th Earl of Selkirk FRSE (1 December 1722 – 24 June 1799) was a Scottish peer.

== Early life ==
Born Dunbar Hamilton, he adopted the name Dunbar Douglas upon his succession to the Earldom of Selkirk in 1744. He was the eldest son of the former Isabella Mackenzie and Basil Hamilton of Baldoon, MP for Kirkcudbright Stewartry. His only surviving sibling was Mary Hamilton, who married Ranald Macdonald of Clanranald.

His maternal grandparents were Elizabeth (née Paterson) Mackenzie (a daughter of Kenneth Mackenzie of Suddie) and Col. Hon. Alexander Mackenzie (a son of Kenneth Mackenzie, 4th Earl of Seaforth). His paternal grandparents were Lord Basil Hamilton (a sixth son of William Hamilton, Duke of Hamilton and Anne Hamilton, suo jure Duchess of Hamilton).

He attended Glasgow University from 1739, being greatly influenced by Francis Hutcheson, Professor of Moral Philosophy. In 1745 he was granted the honorary Doctorate of Civil Law.

== Career ==
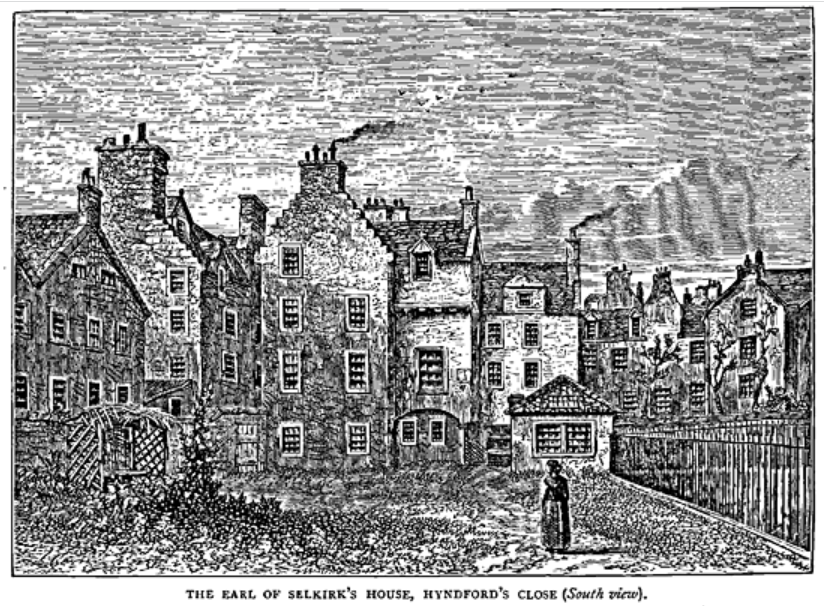
The 4th Earl of Selkirk's house on Hyndford's Close in Edinburgh

In 1742 he was living at a mansion on Hyndford's Close, south of the Royal Mile in Edinburgh.

Selkirk was a supporter of the government during the Jacobite Rising of 1745. He was Rector of the University of Glasgow from 1766 to 1768. He served as Lord Lieutenant of Kirkcudbright and, from 1787, as a Scottish representative peer.

He succeeded to the title of 4th Earl of Selkirk (creation of 1646 in the Peerage of Scotland) and 4th Lord Daer and Shortcleuch (creation of 1646 in the Peerage of Scotland) on 3 December 1744.

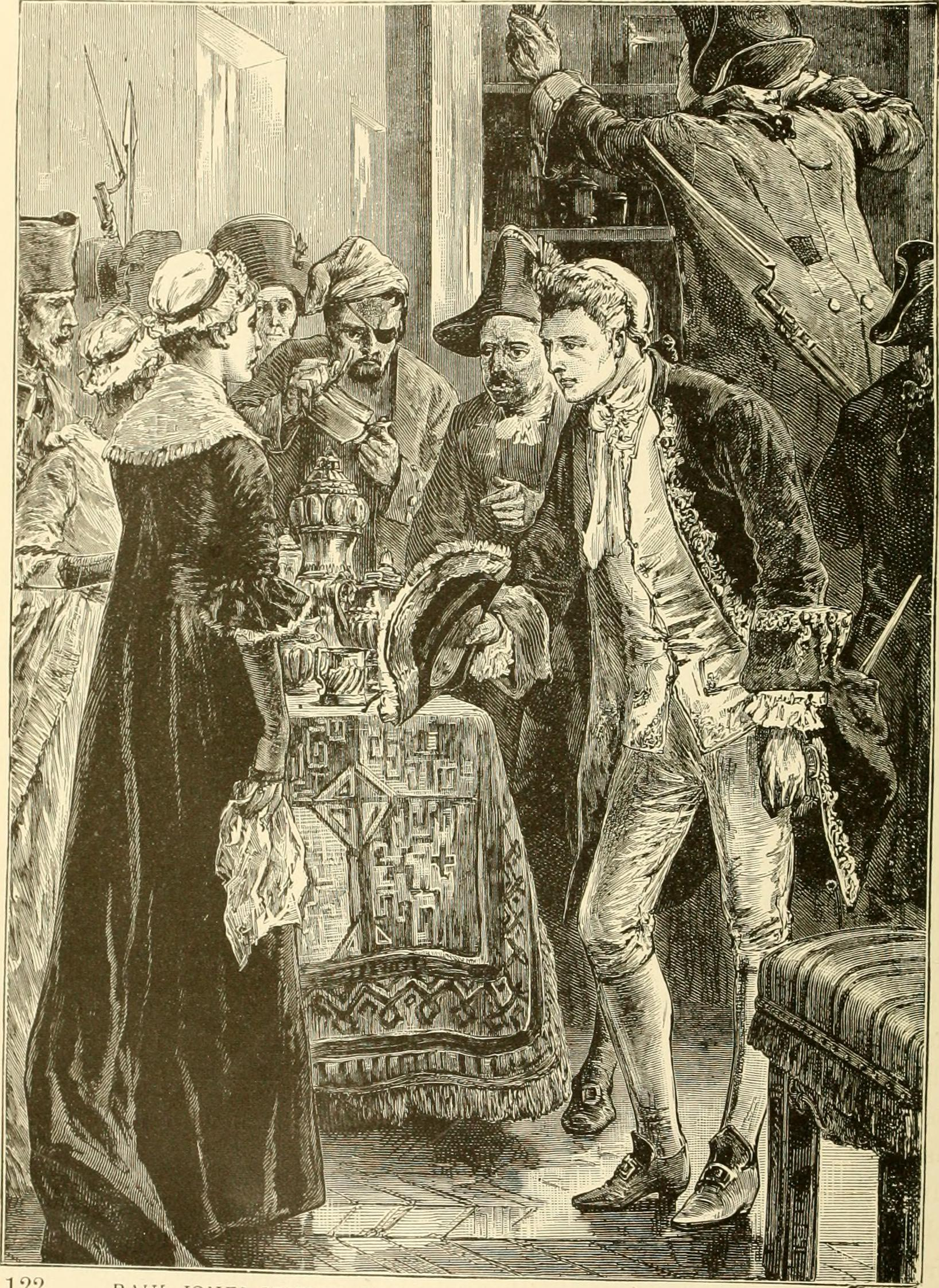
John Paul Jones seizes Lady Selkirk's silver

In 1778, during the American Revolutionary War, Selkirk was the target of a raid by John Paul Jones, who was sailing in the service of the Continental Navy. Jones landed his ship, the Ranger, on the shore of St Mary's Isle, intending to kidnap the Earl. Finding only the countess and her young family at home, his men made off instead with the silver of the household. The story is told more fully here.

In 1782, he became a member of the radical Society for Constitutional Information.

In 1785 he was elected a Fellow of the Royal Society of Edinburgh. His proposers were Dugald Stewart, James Hutton, and Adam Smith.

Lord Selkirk died on 24 June 1799 at his residence on George Street, Edinburgh and was buried at Holyrood Abbey on the 31st of that month

== Family ==
On 3 December 1758, Lord Selkirk married Helen Hamilton (c. 1738–1802), daughter of Hon. John Hamilton and Margaret Home, and granddaughter of Thomas Hamilton, Earl of Haddington. He had seven sons, six of whom predeceased him. The youngest, Thomas, succeeded him as 5th Earl of Selkirk in 1799.

- Sholto Basil Douglas (1759–1760), who died in infancy
- Basil William Douglas, Lord Daer (1760–1794), who died, unmarried, from tuberculosis.
- John Douglas, Lord Daer (1765–1797)
- Hon. Dunbar Douglas (1766–1796), a Commander of the Royal Navy.
- Hon. Alexander Douglas (1767–1794) Captain, 38th Regiment of Foot.
- Lady Helen Hamilton Douglas (c. 1768–1837), who married Sir James Hall, 4th Baronet.
- Hon. David Douglas (1769–1770), who died young.
- Thomas Douglas, 5th Earl of Selkirk (1771–1820), who married Jean Wedderburn-Colville, sister to James Wedderburn and Andrew Colville, in 1807.
- Lady Elizabeth Douglas (c. 1789–1814)
- Lady Katherine Douglas (c. 1790–1848)

Peerage of Scotland
Preceded by John Hamilton	Earl of Selkirk; 1744–1799	Succeeded by Thomas Douglas
