= Dunbar Douglas, 6th Earl of Selkirk =

Scottish peer

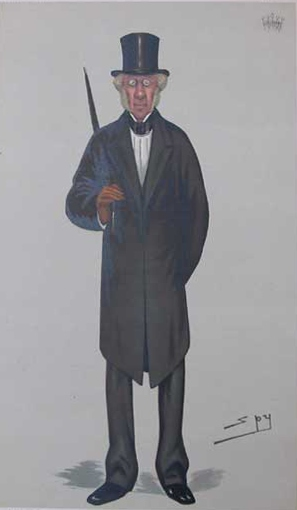
"Created in 1646" The Earl of Selkirk as caricatured by Spy (Leslie Ward) in Vanity Fair, May 1882

Dunbar James Douglas, 6th Earl of Selkirk FRS (22 April 1809 – 11 April 1885) was a Scottish peer.

== Biography ==
The son of Thomas Douglas, 5th Earl of Selkirk and Joan Wedderburn-Colville, was born on 22 April 1809 in London, styled as The Lord Daer from birth until 1820. He succeeded to the title of 6th Earl of Selkirk on 8 April 1820, and the title of 6th Lord Daer and Shortcleuch. He was first educated at Eton College and Christ Church, Oxford, between 1823 at Eton College, in Berkshire, England, matriculating at Christ Church, Oxford University, Oxfordshire, England, on 17 October 1827.

He graduated from Oxford University, in 1830 with a Bachelor of Arts (B.A.), graduating with First Class honours in Mathematics, following this, at Oxford, with in 1834 a Master of Arts (M.A.). He was invested as a Fellow of the Royal Society (F.R.S.) on 13 January 1831.

He was a Representative Peer (Conservative) [Scotland] from 1830 until his death, in 1885, and was twice Keeper of the Great Seal of Scotland from August 1852 until December 1852 and again from 1858 to 1859. He held the Office of Lord-Lieutenant of the Stewartry of Kirkcudbright between 1844 and 1885.

He died at Saint Mary's Isle, in Kirkcudbrightshire, on 11 April 1885 at age 75, without issue, being buried at Kirkcudbright Scotland, close to the family home. The title of Earl of Selkirk devolved on the 12th Duke of Hamilton. The subsidiary title of Lord Daer and Shortcleuch became dormant.

St Mary's Isle, the Kirkcudbright Seat of the Earl of Selkirk, in Kirkcudbright Parish, of Kirkcudbrightshire, is a finely wooded peninsula, projecting southwestward into the head of Kirkcudbright Bay, on the right bank of the River Dee. On it once stood a twelfth century Priory dedicated to St. Mary, becoming the home of The Lord Daer, Son of The Earl of Selkirk. Dunbar James once held 20, 283 acres, over some 39 farms, in Kirkcudbrightshire, valued at £19, 770 per annum, supplemented by a fishery, on the Dee, producing a rental of £150 per annum.

== The Selkirk Estate: The Four Trustees ==
From at least 1820, until 1830, acting for Dunbar Douglas, the Estate of the 5th Earl was managed by a Board of Trustees, and lawyers with ‘powers of attorney’, whose motives and advice could be questioned. Principal trustees had common interests with the 5th Earl that seemed to come into conflict when advising his son Dunbar, as to how to dispose of his father's properties in Canada. 'Appointed by the Last Will and Testamony [sic] of the Right Honourable Thomas Earl of Selkirk; there were four: Andrew Colville (Colvile) of Achiltrie and Crommie, John Hallbrith (Halketh) of Waring, Adam Maitland of Dundrennan, and Sir James Montgomery Baronet.'

Andrew Colvile (Wedderburn), a sugar trader, was a London-based governor of the Hudson's Bay Company, whose sister; Miss Jean Wedderburn-Colville (Lady Selkirk) married The Fifth Earl of Selkirk. When Thomas Douglas began buying into the Hudson's Bay Company, he followed suit, and by 1810 was on the HBC Board. As a brother-in-law, he was associated with his establishment of the Red River Colony, in Canada, and on the death of the former, he took over the trust, as a trustee of the 5th Earl of Selkirk Estate. As a Member of the London Committee of the Hudson's Bay Company, he was instrumental in bringing about the Union with the North West Company in 1821, the principal opponent to the Selkirk settlement in the Red River Colony. The North West Company directors, Alexander Mackenzie and Edward Ellice, held large blocks of Hudson's Bay Company stock and were able to cause much of the "delaying action" that was so nearly fatal to Lord Selkirk's plans.

John Wedderburn Halkett was born in Dunfermline, Scotland, an HBC director. His second wife, was Lady Katherine Douglas, sister of Thomas Douglas, Earl of Selkirk. In 1801, he was appointed Governor of the Bahamas and in 1803–05 Captain General and Governor of Tobago. In 1808, when his two cousins, Andrew Colvile (Wedderburn), and Lord Selkirk, became interested in the Hudson's Bay Company, he followed. He was appointed a member of the HBC's London Committee in November 1811, a few months after the Company had granted land to Selkirk, for the establishment of his colony. Between 1815 and 1820, Halkett engaged in damage control on behalf of Selkirk, defending his conduct in North America, trying to counteract what he considered misleading and false statements circulated by the Directors of The North West Company, about Selkirk's character and his work, and on his death was appointed a trustee of the 5th Earl of Selkirk Estate.

Adam Maitland, a trustee for the 5th Earl of Selkirk, was born on 28 April 1764 at Kirkcudbright, Kirkcudbrightshire, in Scotland, marrying Stuart McWhan, he died on 20 July 1843, being buried at Dundrennan, Kirkcudbrightshire, Scotland. On 31 March 1800 he inherited Dundrennan from his wife's uncle, Dr. Thomas Cairns, being recognised by the Lord Lyon King of Arms, and matriculated his arms at the Lyons Office in 1806. He was with the Honourable East India Company Service.

Sir James (William) Montgomery of Peeblesshire, Scotland, the son of Sir James Montgomery, 1st Baronet Stanhope, succeeded to the Baronetcy of Stanhope in 1803, from his father, who was then the most active of the PEI absentee proprietors, in the period, before Selkirk. As his father had first been granted Lot 7, in 1767 Land Lottery, by 1770 he held title to Lots 30, 34, 36 and 51 (all originally granted to his close friends), then totalling of over some 100,000 acres. In 1775, his father added half of Lot 12, and two-thirds of Lot 59 (sections of which the 2nd Baronet later sold to Selkirk). An old man by 1802, the elder Montgomery turned over his affairs to the 2nd Baronet, who was said to lack the benefit of his older brother William's military service background and his Island experiences. He married, Lady Elizabeth Douglas, sister of Thomas Douglas, 5th Earl of Selkirk, on 1 August 1804. He died on 27 May 1839 at age 72.

== The Canadian Holdings: The 1834 and 1860 Sales ==
The sixth Earl of Selkirk came of age in 1830; receiving the compliments Donald Mackenzie, then the shrewd and capable Governor of the Red River Settlement, the District of Assiniboia, as he was to ‘beg to congratulate you and all my employers’, he wrote to Andrew Colvile, 'on the prosperous state of the Colony.' This to paint a picture of prosperity that paved the way for the transfer of the settlement from the Young Earl to the Hudson's Bay Company. This after his father's executors, administering the colony, sought to reduce expenses by ending settlers' subsidies, refused to recruit and fund new European immigrants, seeing population growth come slowly through the retirement to the colony of fur traders and their Metis families, or their dismissal due to downsizing by the Hudson's Bay Company after 1821. In 1834, the Sixth Earl of Selkirk acceded to the 'desire expressed by the Committee to have re-conveyed' the Grant of Assiniboia for £15,000 of the Hudson's Bay Company stock. With this some 116,000 square miles (300,000 square kilometres), less that deeded to the settlers, the Selkirk Concession, was sold to the shrewd Company officials who could be relied upon to endorse the measure from the standpoint of the good of the fur trade.

In Prince Edward Island, the ultimate results of his father's work came to have far-reaching and exceptional merit, in the unpleasant story of absentee proprietary ownership on that island. Much of his land gained directly through original grants from Lord William Campbell, the 5th Earl's interests having been secured through purchase by lease and release, from individual holders. At its peak in 1831, the Selkirk PEI Estate consisted of Lots 10, 31, 57, 58, 60, and Lot 62, one-half of 12, one-third of 53, and one-third of 59, some 142, 966 acres. In 1842, the Estate was estimated at some 114,000 acres; the lands having been correctly disposed of by sale or lease of 99 or 999 years. In 1860, Dunbar Douglas, Lord Selkirk, acting on advice of his land agent, sold his holdings to the Island Colonial Government, then containing some 62,059 acres, for £6,586 17s 8d Sterling, the per acre price stated as 2s 2p Sterling (this the lowest price paid for land lottery grant lands).

== Marriage ==
Cecily Louisa Grey-Egerton was born in 1836 to Sir Philip de Malpas Grey-Egerton and Anne Elizabeth Grey-Egerton. Her father, Sir Philip was born on 13 November 1806 in Oulton Park, Cheshire, England and her mother, Lady Anne (born Legh) was born on 28 December 1808 in East Hall, High Legh, also in Cheshire.

Baptised in 1836, Cecily Louisa married Dunbar James Douglas on 29 June 1878 at Little Budworth, Chester, England. She was then 42 and her husband 69. After a short marriage of six years, the 6th Earl of Selkirk died on 11 April 1885 at age 75. The Countess of Selkirk remained a widow for 35 years, and died on 10 January 1920 at Balmaclellan, Scotland.

The graves of Cecily Louisa and her husband Dunbar James sit at the top of a gentle slope, in The Galt-way (Gatta/Gata) Kirk Cemetery located southeast of Kirkcudbright, within its former churchyard, on the Farmstead of Banks, now held by Sir David Hope-Dunbar. The Countess lies close to the graves of Captain John Hope R.N., a Selkirk grandson, his wife, and her children, he a son of Lady Isabella-Helen Douglas and The Hon. Charles Hope.

Honorary titles
Preceded by The Earl of Galloway	Lord Lieutenant of Kirkcudbright; 1845–1885	Succeeded by The Lord Herries of Terregles
Peerage of Scotland
Preceded by Dunbar Douglas	Earl of Selkirk; 1820–1885	Succeeded by Charles Douglas-Hamilton
