= Earl of Selkirk =

Scottish nobility

Arms of the Earl of Selkirk

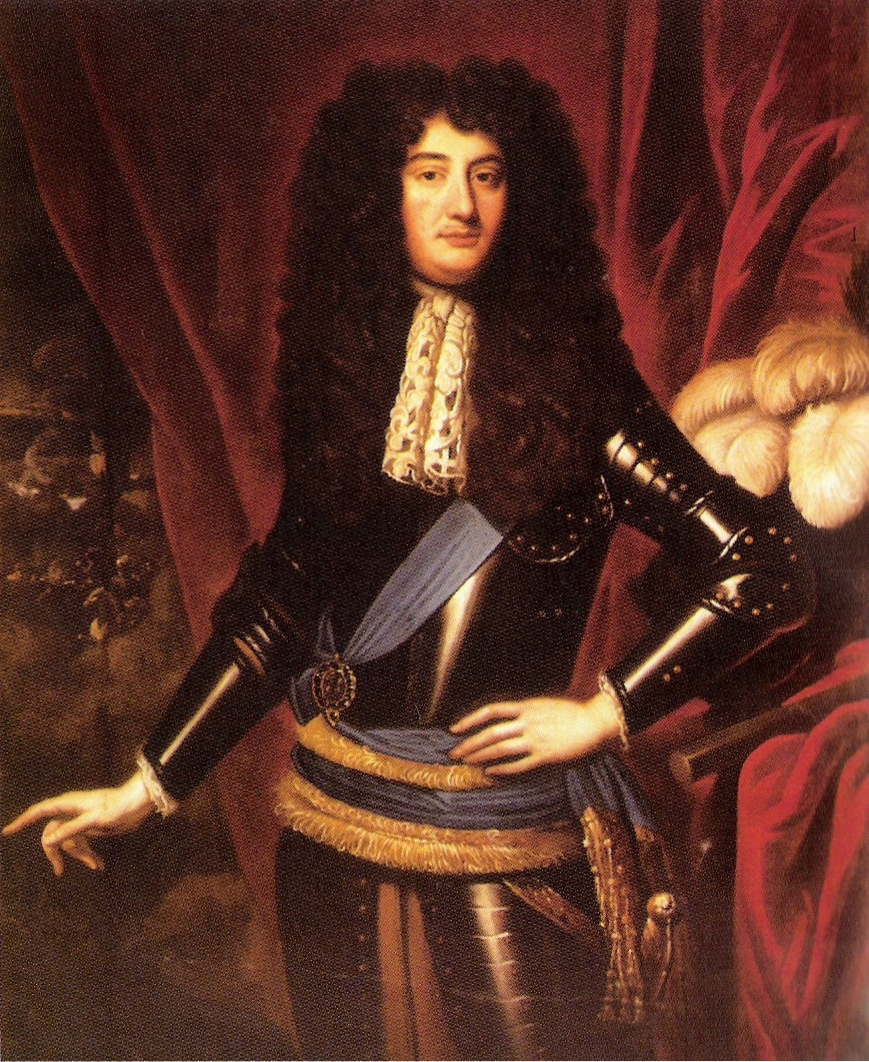
William, 1st Earl of Selkirk

Earl of Selkirk is a title in the Peerage of Scotland, used since 1646. It has rules of inheritance subject to unusual and unique provisions.

== History ==
The title was created on 14 August 1646 for Lord William Douglas, third son of William Douglas, 1st Marquess of Douglas, along with the title Lord Daer and Shortcleuch. On 29 April 1656, the first earl married Anne Hamilton, 3rd Duchess of Hamilton. In 1660, after the birth of two sons, he changed his surname from Douglas to "Hamilton", and was created Duke of Hamilton for life, as was then a not uncommon practice in Scotland when a peeress in her own right married someone of lesser degree.

=== Second earl's surrender and novodamus ===
On 6 October 1688, during the reign of James VII, the new Duke of Hamilton surrendered his previous titles to the Crown (except Hamilton). They were reconferred on his third (but second surviving) son Charles, who thereby became second Earl of Selkirk, and who also reverted to his original surname of "Douglas". Thus, while the eldest son was to inherit the title of Duke of Hamilton and have his mother's maiden name for surname, the younger son was to inherit his father's dignities and perpetuate the name of Douglas.

This novodamus for this arrangement embodied a unique remainder, the effect of which was that:

1. the titles would pass to the heirs male of the 1st earl's younger sons before the heirs male of his eldest son (who was heir apparent to his mother's Dukedom of Hamilton);
2. if the person who would otherwise inherit the title was already duke of Hamilton (or would inherit that dukedom at the same time), the titles would pass instead to that duke's next surviving brother;
3. if the titles were ever held by a duke of Hamilton (either because an earl of Selkirk succeeded as duke of Hamilton, or because provision 2 was unable to operate because the heir was a duke of Hamilton who had no surviving younger brothers), the titles would pass on that duke's death to his second surviving son;
4. if the titles had passed to a younger brother or younger son under provisions 2 or 3, they would then pass to his heirs male on his death; but
5. if such a younger son or younger brother's heirs male died out, the title would not pass to his own younger brothers and their heirs male, but would instead revert to the senior male line, with provisions 2 and 3 operating as before.

This remainder is so unusual that "Hamilton House", a Scottish country dance, reputedly was created around it.

=== Third earl ===
The second earl died childless in 1739, and his younger brother, John Hamilton, 1st Earl of Ruglen (who had been so created on 14 April 1697), succeeded as the third earl. He outlived his son and heir, and when he died in 1744 the Earldom of Ruglen and its subsidiary titles passed to his daughter Anne Douglas, Countess of March, and on her death in 1748 to William Douglas, 3rd Earl of March (later 4th Duke of Queensberry).

=== Fourth, fifth and sixth earls ===
The earldom of Selkirk and its subsidiary title, being limited to male heirs, passed to Dunbar Hamilton, grandson of Lord Basil Hamilton, sixth son of the first earl. Upon succeeding as fourth earl, he, like the second earl, changed his surname to "Douglas".

On the fourth earl's death in 1799, he was succeeded by his only surviving son, Thomas, as fifth earl, who was then succeeded on his own death in 1820 by his only son, Dunbar, as sixth earl.

=== Seventh earl ===
On his death in 1885, the heirs male of the younger sons of the first earl expired. The heir male of the first earl's eldest son was William Douglas-Hamilton, 12th Duke of Hamilton, but under the special remainder (provision 2 above) the titles passed instead to his younger brother, Lord Charles Hamilton, who succeeded as seventh earl.

=== Eighth earl ===
When the seventh earl died unmarried in 1886, the titles reverted to his elder brother, who had no further brothers to whom they could pass, and who accordingly succeeded as eighth earl.

=== Ninth earl ===
When the eighth earl died without a son in 1895, the dukedom passed to his fourth cousin, Alfred Douglas-Hamilton, who succeeded as 13th duke of Hamilton. As he also had no brothers, he also succeeded as ninth earl of Selkirk.

=== Tenth earl ===
When the ninth earl died in 1940, his eldest son, Douglas Douglas-Hamilton, inherited the dukedom, but the earldom of Selkirk and its subsidiary title passed under the special remainder (provision 3 above) to his second son, Lord George Douglas-Hamilton, who succeeded as 10th earl.

=== Eleventh earl ===
Upon the death of the 10th earl in 1994, married but childless, the titles passed (under provision 5 above) to his nephew, Lord James Douglas-Hamilton, second son of the 14th Duke of Hamilton and next brother of Angus Douglas-Hamilton, 15th Duke of Hamilton, who succeeded as 11th earl. This succession was unsuccessfully challenged in the Court of the Lord Lyon by Alasdair Douglas-Hamilton, son of Lord Malcolm Douglas-Hamilton, next brother of the 10th Earl. Lord Malcolm had died in 1969 as heir presumptive to the 10th earl and his son was listed thereafter in that position by reference works such as Whitaker's Almanack (Note: Specifically, page 155 of 1992 edition) and Debrett's (Note: Specifically, page P1141 of the 1995 edition, which went to press before the 10th earl's death) but it was the ruling of the court that the death of the 14th duke in 1973 had placed the younger sons of the 14th duke ahead of the younger sons of the 13th duke and their issue in line to the earldom.

The 11th earl was, at the time of his succession, the Member of Parliament for Edinburgh West, and he disclaimed the titles in order to remain in the House of Commons, thus preventing a by-election at a very politically sensitive time. He was later elevated to the House of Lords with a life peerage as Baron Selkirk of Douglas, and served as a Member of the Scottish Parliament.

== Present peer ==
(John) Andrew Douglas-Hamilton, 12th Earl of Selkirk (born 8 February 1978) is the oldest of the four sons of James Alexander Douglas-Hamilton, briefly the 11th Earl, later created Baron Selkirk of Douglas, and of his wife Priscilla Susan Buchan. His father was the second son of Douglas Douglas-Hamilton, 14th Duke of Hamilton.

He was styled as Master of Selkirk and as Lord Daer between 1978 and 2023. On 28 November 2023, he succeeded as Earl of Selkirk, under the special remainder.

== Earls of Selkirk (1646) ==
- William Douglas-Hamilton, 1st Earl of Selkirk, jure uxoris 3rd Duke of Hamilton (1634–1694)
- Charles Douglas, 2nd Earl of Selkirk (1663–1739) (son of the 1st Earl, younger brother of 4th Duke of Hamilton)
- John Hamilton, 3rd Earl of Selkirk (1664–1744) (brother of 2nd Earl, younger brother of 4th Duke of Hamilton)
- Dunbar Douglas, 4th Earl of Selkirk (1722–1799) (great-nephew of the 3rd Earl)
- Thomas Douglas, 5th Earl of Selkirk (1771–1820) (son of the 4th Earl)
- Dunbar James Douglas, 6th Earl of Selkirk (1809–1885) (son of the 5th Earl)
- Charles George Hamilton, 7th Earl of Selkirk (1847–1886) (fourth cousin once removed of the 6th Earl, younger brother of the 12th Duke of Hamilton)
- William Alexander Louis Stephen Douglas-Hamilton, 12th Duke of Hamilton, 8th Earl of Selkirk (1845–1895) (older brother of 7th Earl)
- Alfred Douglas Douglas-Hamilton, 13th Duke of Hamilton, 9th Earl of Selkirk (1862–1940) (fourth cousin of the 8th Earl)
- George Nigel Douglas-Hamilton, 10th Earl of Selkirk (1906–1994) (son of the 9th Earl, brother of the 14th Duke of Hamilton)
- James Alexander Douglas-Hamilton, 11th Earl of Selkirk (1942–2023) (nephew of the 10th Earl, brother of the 15th Duke of Hamilton) (disclaimed 1994)
- John Andrew Douglas-Hamilton, 12th Earl of Selkirk (b. 1978) (son of the 11th Earl)

The heir presumptive is the present earl's younger brother Charles Douglas Douglas-Hamilton (b. 1979).

== Line of succession ==
Everyone in the line of succession to the Duke of Hamilton is eligible to succeed to the Earldom, but in the order dictated by its special remainder: the sons of Lord Selkirk of Douglas, starting with the present earl, come first (with potential male issue of any of them preceding younger brothers of that son), but should any future Earl of Selkirk die without a direct heir, the death of the 15th Duke of Hamilton in 2010 means that the younger son of the 15th Duke would rank ahead of lines from younger sons of the 14th Duke and the death of the 16th Duke would likewise move his younger sons to the head of the line.

Current line of succession (simplified)
- Alfred Douglas-Hamilton, 13th Duke of Hamilton, 10th Duke of Brandon, 9th Earl of Selkirk (1862–1940)
  - Douglas Douglas-Hamilton, 14th Duke of Hamilton, 11th Duke of Brandon (1903–1973)
    - Angus Douglas-Hamilton, 15th Duke of Hamilton, 12th Duke of Brandon (1938–2010)
      - Alexander Douglas-Hamilton, 16th Duke of Hamilton, 13th Duke of Brandon (b. 1978)
        - Douglas Charles Douglas-Hamilton, Marquess of Douglas and Clydesdale (b. 2012)
        - Lord William Frederick Douglas-Hamilton (b. 2014)
        - Lord Basil George Douglas-Hamilton (b. 2016)
      - (4). Lord John William Douglas-Hamilton (b. 1979)
    - James Douglas-Hamilton, Baron Selkirk of Douglas (1942–2023)
      - John Andrew Douglas-Hamilton, 12th Earl of Selkirk (b. 1978)
      - (1). Hon. Charles Douglas Douglas-Hamilton (b. 1979)
      - (2). Hon. James Robert Douglas-Hamilton (b. 1981)
      - (3). Hon. Harry Alexander Douglas-Hamilton (b. 1981)
    - Lord Hugh Malcolm Douglas-Hamilton (1946–1995)
      - Brendan Thomas Douglas-Hamilton (b. 1974)
    - Lord Patrick George Douglas-Hamilton (b. 1950)
  - George Douglas-Hamilton, 10th Earl of Selkirk (1906–1994)
  - Lord Malcolm Avondale Douglas-Hamilton (1909–1964)
    - Alasdair Malcolm Douglas-Hamilton (b. 1939)
      - Angus Gavin Douglas-Hamilton (b. 1968)
        - William Niall Douglas-Hamilton (b. 1999)
      - Geordie Fergus Douglas-Hamilton (b. 1969)

== Family tree ==
Douglas-Hamilton family trees: Dukes of: Abercorn, Brandon, and Hamilton with subsidiary and courtesy titles

James II; 1430–1460; King of Scotland
Earl of Arran (Scotland) (1st creation), 1467	Lord Hamilton, 1445
Thomas Boyd d. c. 1473; Earl of Arran	Mary Stewart; 1453–1488 dowager Countess of Arran	James Hamilton c. 1415–1479; 1st Lord Hamilton	James III; 1451–1488; King of Scotland
Earldom of Arran (1st creation) forfeit, 1469
Earl of Arran (Scotland) (2nd creation), 1503
James Hamilton c. 1475–1529; 2nd Lord Hamilton, 1st Earl of Arran	James IV; 1473–1513; King of Scotland
Catherine Stewart (illegit.) c. 1495–1554	James Douglas d. 1548; Earl of Morton
Duke of Châtellerault (France) (5th creation), 1548
James Hamilton c. 1516–1575; 2nd Earl of Arran, 3rd Lord Hamilton, 1st Duke of Châtellerault	Margaret Douglas c. 1510–1579
Dukedom of Châtellerault (5th creation) forfeit, 1559
Marquess of Hamilton, Earl of Arran, and Lord Aven, 1599	Lord Paisley, 1587
James Hamilton c. 1533–1609; 3rd Earl of Arran, 4th Lord Hamilton	Anne Hamilton c. 1535 – c. 1574 m. George Gordon Earl of Huntly	John Hamilton; 1540–1604; 1st Marquess of Hamilton, etc.	Claud Hamilton; 1546–1621; Lord Paisley
Earl of Cambridge (England) (4th creation) and Baron of Innerdale, 1619	Lord Abercorn, 1603; Earl of Abercorn, Lord of Paisley, Hamilton, Mountcastell and Kilpatrick, 1606
George Gordon; 1562–1636; Marquess of Huntly	James Hamilton; 1589–1625; 2nd Marquess of Hamilton, etc., 4th Earl of Arran, 1st Earl of Cambridge, etc. 5th Lord Hamilton, Lord Aberbrothwick/Arbroath	James Hamilton; 1575–1618; 1st Earl of Abercorn, Lord Abercorn and Lord of Paisley, Hamilton, Mountcastell and Kilpatrick
Earldom of Angus (1389 creation) resigned in favor of: Marquess of Douglas, Earl of Angus, Lord Abernethy, Lord Bonkyll and Preston, Lord Abernethy, and Lord Jedburgh Forest, 1633	Duke of Hamilton, Marquess of Clydesdale, Earl of Arran and Cambridge (Scotland) and Baron of Aven and Innerdale, 1643	Earl of Lanark, 1639	Baron Hamilton of Strabane, 1617
William Douglas; 1589–1660; 1st Marquess of Douglas, etc. 11th Earl of Angus (1389 creation)	Mary Gordon c. 1600–1674	James Hamilton; 1606–1649; 1st Duke of Hamilton, etc., 3rd Marquess of Hamilton, etc., 5th Earl of Arran, 2nd Earl of Cambridge, etc.	William Hamilton; 1616–1651; 2nd Duke of Hamilton, etc., 1st Earl of Lanark, 6th Earl of Arran, 3rd Earl of Cambridge, etc.	James Hamilton c. 1604 – c. 1670; 2nd Earl of Abercorn, etc., 2nd Lord Paisley, 1st Lord Hamilton of Strabane	Claud Hamilton c. 1606–1638; 2nd Lord Hamilton of Strabane	George Hamilton c. 1607–1679
Earldom of Cambridge (4th creation) and Barony of Innerdale extinct and Earldom of Arran (2nd creation) dormant, 1651
Earl of Selkirk and Lord Daer and Shortcleuch, 1646
see Earl of Ormond family tree for Marquesses of Douglas, Earls of Angus, etc.	William Douglas-Hamilton; 1634–1694 jure uxoris Duke of Hamilton, etc. suo jure, 1st Earl of Selkirk, etc.	Anne Hamilton; 1631–1716 suo jure 3rd Duchess of Hamilton, etc., 2nd Countess of Lanark	George Hamilton c. 1636 – c. 1680; 3rd Earl of Abercorn, etc.	James Hamilton c. 1633 – c. 1670; Lord Paisley	James Hamilton; 1633–1655; 3rd Lord Hamilton of Strabane	George Hamilton c. 1636–1668; 4th Lord Hamilton of Strabane	James Hamilton c. 1620–1673
Ceded Dukedom of Hamilton to 4th Duke, 1698
Duke of Brandon and Baron Dutton, 1711	Earl of Ruglen, 1697	Earl of Orkney (3rd creation), 1697	Viscount Strabane and Baron Mountcastle, 1701
James Hamilton; 1658–1712; 4th Duke of Hamilton, etc., 1st Duke of Brandon, etc. 3rd Earl of Lanark, etc.	Charles Douglas; 1663–1739; 2nd Earl of Selkirk, etc.	John Douglas-Hamilton; 1664–1744; 3rd Earl of Selkirk, etc., 1st Earl of Ruglen	George Hamilton; 1666–1737; 1st Earl of Orkney	Basil Hamilton; 1671–1701	Catherine Hamilton	Charles Hamilton d. 1701; 5th Earl of Abercorn, etc., 6th Lord Hamilton of Strabane	Claud Hamilton; 1658–1691; 4th Earl of Abercorn, etc., 5th Lord Hamilton of Strabane	James Hamilton c. 1661–1734; 6th Earl of Abercorn, etc., 7th Lord Hamilton of Strabane
see Earls of Ruglen	see Earls of Orkney	Basil Hamilton; 1696–1742	James Hamilton; 1685–1744; 7th Earl of Abercorn, etc., 8th Lord Hamilton of Strabane
Viscount Hamilton, 1786
James Hamilton; 1703–1743; 5th Duke of Hamilton, etc., 2nd Duke of Brandon, etc. 4th Earl of Lanark, etc.	Lord Anne Hamilton; 1709–1748	Dunbar Douglas; 1722–1799; 4th Earl of Selkirk, etc.	James Hamilton; 1712–1789; 8th Earl of Abercorn, etc., 9th Lord Hamilton of Strabane, 1st Viscount Hamilton	John Hamilton; 1714–1755
Baron Hamilton of Hameldon county, Leicester, 1776	Marquess of Abercorn, 1790
James Hamilton; 1724–1758; 6th Duke of Hamilton, etc., 3rd Duke of Brandon, etc., 5th Earl of Lanark, etc.	Elizabeth Gunning (c. 1733–1790) suo jure 1st Baroness Hamilton	Archibald Hamilton; 1740–1819; 9th Duke of Hamilton, etc., 6th Duke of Brandon, 8th Earl of Lanark, etc.	Charles Powell Hamilton; 1747–1825	John Hamilton; 1756–1818; 1st Marquess of Abercorn, 9th Earl of Abercorn, etc., 10th Lord Hamilton of Strabane
James Hamilton; 1755–1769; 7th Duke of Hamilton, etc., 4th Duke of Brandon and Baron Dutton, Marquess of Angus and Abernethy, 4th Marquess of Douglas, etc., 6th Earl of Lanark, etc.	Douglas Hamilton; 1756–1799; 8th Duke of Hamilton, etc., 5th Duke of Brandon, Marquess of Douglas, etc.<>br/>7th Earl of Lanark, etc., 2nd Baron Hamilton	Alexander Hamilton; 1767–1852; 10th Duke of Hamilton, etc., 7th Duke of Brandon, Marquess of Douglas, and Baron Dutton, Earl of Angus, and Lord Abernethy and Jedburgh Forest, 9th Earl of Lanark, etc.	Augustus Barrington Price Anne Powell Douglas-Hamilton; 1781–1849	Thomas Douglas; 1771–1820; 5th Earl of Selkirk, etc.	James Hamilton; 1786–1818 styled Viscount Hamilton
Duke of Abercorn, of Strabane and Duke of Abercorn, 1868
William Alexander Anthony Archibald Hamilton; 1811–1863; 11th Duke of Hamilton, etc., 8th Duke of Brandon, Marquess of Douglas, Earl of Angus, Lord Abernethy and Jedburgh Forest, and Baron Dutton, 10th Earl of Lanark, etc.	Charles Douglas-Hamilton; 1808–1873	Dunbar James Douglas; 1809–1885; 6th Earl of Selkirk, etc.	James Hamilton; 1811–1885; 1st Duke of Abercorn, 2nd Marquess of Abercorn, 10th Earl of Abercorn, etc., 2nd Viscount Hamilton, 11th Lord Hamilton of Strabane
Duke of Châtellerault (France) (5th creation), revived 1548
William Alexander Louis Stephen Douglas-Hamilton; 1845–1895; 12th Duke of Hamilton, etc., 9th Duke of Brandon, Marquess of Douglas, Earl of Angus, Lord Abernethy and Jedburgh Forest and Baron Dutton, 2nd Duke of Châtellerault, 8th Earl of Selkirk, etc., 11th Earl of Lanark, etc.	Charles George Douglas-Hamilton; 1847–1886; 7th Earl of Selkirk, etc.	James Hamilton; 1838–1913; 2nd Duke of Abercorn, 3rd Marquess of Abercorn, 11th Earl of Abercorn, etc., 12th Lord Hamilton of Strabane
Alfred Douglas Douglas-Hamilton; 1862–1940; 13th Duke of Hamilton, etc., 10th Duke of Brandon, Marquess of Douglas, Earl of Angus (1633 creation), Lord Abernethy and Jedburgh Forest, and Baron Dutton, 20th Earl of Angus (1389 creation), 9th Earl of Selkirk, etc., 12th Earl of Lanark, etc.	James Albert Edward Hamilton; 1869–1953; 3rd Duke of Abercorn, 4th Marquess of Abercorn, 12th Earl of Abercorn, etc., 13th Lord Hamilton of Strabane
Douglas Douglas-Hamilton; 1903–1973; 14th Duke of Hamilton, etc., 11th Duke of Brandon, Marquess of Douglas, Earl of Angus (1633 creation), Lord Abernethy and Jedburgh Forest, and Baron Dutton, 21st Earl of Angus (1389 creation), 13rd Earl of Lanark, etc.	George Nigel Douglas-Hamilton; 1906–1994; 10th Earl of Selkirk, etc., 10th Lord Daer and Shortcleuch	Malcolm Douglas-Hamilton; 1909–1964	James Edward Hamilton; 1904–1979; 4th Duke of Abercorn, 5th Marquess of Abercorn, 13th Earl of Abercorn, etc., 14th Lord Hamilton of Strabane
Baron Selkirk of Douglas, 1997
Angus Alan Douglas Douglas-Hamilton; 1938–2010; 15th Duke of Hamilton, etc., 12th Duke of Brandon, Marquess of Douglas, Earl of Angus (1633 creation), Lord Abernethy and Jedburgh Forest, and Baron Dutton, 22nd Earl of Angus (1389 creation), 14th Earl of Lanark, etc.	James Alexander Douglas-Hamilton; 1942–2023; 11th Earl of Selkirk, etc., Earldom disclaimed, 1994, Baron Selkirk of Douglas	Alasdair Douglas-Hamilton b. 1939	James Hamilton b. 1934; 5th Duke of Abercorn, 6th Marquess of Abercorn, 14th Earl of Abercorn, etc., 15th Lord Hamilton of Strabane
Barony Selkirk of Douglas expired as a life peerage, 2023
Alexander Douglas-Hamilton b. 1978; 16th Duke of Hamilton, etc., 13th Duke of Brandon, Marquess of Douglas, Earl of Angus (1633 creation), Lord Abernethy and Jedburgh Forest, and Baron Dutton, 23rd Earl of Angus (1389 creation), 15th Earl of Lanark and Lord Machanshyre and Polmont	John William Douglas-Hamilton b. 1979	John Andrew Douglas-Hamilton b. 1978; 12th Earl of Selkirk, etc.	Charles Douglas Douglas-Hamilton (b. 1979)	Angus Gavin Douglas-Hamilton b. 1968	James Hamilton b. 1969 styled Marquess of Hamilton
Heir presumptive to the Earldom of Selkirk
Douglas Douglas-Hamilton b. 2012 styled Marquess of Douglas and Clydesdale	William Frederick Douglas-Hamilton b. 2014	Basil George Douglas-Hamilton b. 2016	William Douglas-Hamilton b. 1999	James Hamilton b. 2005 styled Viscount Strabane
Heir apparent to the dukedoms of Hamilton and Brandon
