= Robert Richardson (Lord Treasurer) =

Scottish prior

Robert Richardson (died 1578) was a Scottish Prior of St Mary's Isle and royal administrator.

== Biography ==
He was the son of Robert Richardson, burgess of Jedburgh (died ca. 1556). His great-grandfather arrived in Scotland in 1424 in the reign of James I. The historian George Crawfurd asserts that he was descended of a stock of ancient and opulent burgesses of Edinburgh, but there is little to connect him with the city before 1553, when he was made a burgess at the request of the fourth earl of Huntly.

He matriculated at St Salvator's College, St Andrews, in 1531, and graduated MA in 1532. Nothing is known of his early career except that in April 1544 he was involved with the Earl of Lennox in armed opposition to the Regent Arran at the battle of Glasgow, for which he later received remission. He was presented to the vicarage of Dunsyre in 1549 and held the vicarage of Eckford by 1552. In that year he was provided by the Pope to the archdeaconry of Teviotdale, which he held until 1565 along with the appropriated parsonage of Morebattle. In 1558 he obtained crown presentation to the priory of St Mary's Isle, near Kirkcudbright, which he also resigned in 1565, retaining the usufruct.

Richardson's career as a royal official began around 1549 when he was comptroller clerk. In November 1552 he was an auditor of the treasurer's account. Gilbert Kennedy, 3rd Earl of Cassilis, appointed lord treasurer in April 1554, delegated the entire conduct of business to Richardson as treasurer clerk. After Cassillis's death in November 1558 Richardson continued as treasurer clerk and acting treasurer.

== Scottish Reformation ==
As acting treasurer, it was probably in this capacity, rather than as "Maister of the Cunze-house", that he held the coining irons of the mint at Holyroodhouse. In July 1559 the Protestant Lords of the Congregation who occupied Edinburgh seized these, along with great sums of money, claiming that they had done so to stop corruption of the coinage. The irons were returned to him according to the terms of the Articles of Leith between the lords and Mary of Guise.

After the siege of Leith, Richardson sat as a prelate at the Reformation Parliament of 1560 and was listed by Knox among those "that had renunceit Papistrie and oppinlie profest Jesus Chryst with us.". Finally appointed Lord Treasurer on 5 March 1561, he was a member of the privy council from 1561 to 1576. In 1562 he was named as one of the commissioners for receiving rentals of benefices and in October of that year was granted a pension of £1000 Scots from the thirds of benefices pending provision to a benefice of equal or greater value.

The Reformation gave him further opportunities to add to the landed estate he had been acquiring since 1552, mainly in East Lothian and Midlothian. Three charters by the commendator and convent of Dunfermline on 28 July 1563 conveyed to him extensive lands, mainly in Haddingtonshire, Edinburghshire, and Fife, amounting to no fewer than seventy-seven farms and scattered holdings. From September 1565 onwards he disposed of a large part of this property to the tenants, no doubt profitably. He retained lands and coal mines around Musselburgh, including Smeaton, where either he or his son built what in 1577 was described as a new house. He also acquired some small properties belonging to Jedburgh Abbey. Crawfurd wrote of Richardson:

He appears to have been a very wise moderate man; for so far as I can observe from the history of these times, he kept himself more in a neutrality, and was less a party-man than any other that held any great office about the court. He was never violent against the Queen, tho' he complied with the Government under the young King.

== King's man and Lord High Treasurer ==
Richardson supported the overthrow of Mary, Queen of Scots. He attended the coronation of the infant James VI in 1567, and was present at Mary's defeat at the battle of Langside in May 1568 on the side of her half-brother and opponent, James Stuart, 1st Earl of Moray. In 1569, at the Perth convention, he voted to refuse Mary, Queen of Scots' divorce from Bothwell. His support for the new regime is also evidenced by a loan of £5,000 Scots to the Earl of Moray, now the Regent of Scotland, on 17 September 1567, secured on a pledge of a selection of the queen's jewels. He raised money for Regent Moray by pawning more of the personal jewellery of Mary, Queen of Scots. Regent Mar wrote to him to complain about the sale of one of Mary's emerald jewels in Paris.

In 1570, as he was "greitlie superexpendit as treasurer and unable to pay his creditors" Regent Moray gave him the revenue arising from wards and marriages and vacant benefices. In January 1571 the lease of the mint, which he had held since 1566, was renewed for three years, with half the profits to pay off his superexpenses as treasurer.

According to a contemporary source, John Cunningham of Drumquhassle had been made "half thesaurer, with Mr Robert Ritchartsone that wes thesaurer of befoir" in July 1570, but Richardson remained in sole charge until 24 June 1571, when he was replaced by William, Lord Ruthven. During the Marian Civil War, in June 1572, conditions were agreed at Leith between Richardson, as furnisher of the mint or "cunziehous" and John Acheson to mint silver coins.

Richardson retained control of the mint until March 1573, his share of the profits amounting to more than £5400 Scots. Thereafter he continued to receive money from the mint to redeem the royal jewels that had been pledged to him, further payments being made to his sons after his death, which probably took place between May and November 1578.

The younger Robert Richardson was repaid £5,000 Scots from the loan in August 1579, and the treasurer's accounts note that the Commendator had died and the pledged jewels were returned. In addition, a gold chain belt of pearl knots and a hair garnishing with 57 diamonds was returned to Holyrood Palace by his son James Richardson on 18 March 1580.

== Family ==
Richardson was unmarried but his four children, James, Robert, Stephen, and Janet were legitimated in 1552; another child (Katherine) may have been born in December 1563, when Randolph reported to Cecil that Richardson was to do public penance in St Giles for getting a woman with child and Knox was to "mayke the sermonde.". James Richardson of Smeaton, the eldest of Richardson's children, received most of his father's lands; he married Elizabeth Douglas, and their second son, Sir Robert Richardson of Pencaitland, was created a baronet in 1630.

== Notes ==
Attribution

This article incorporates text from a publication now in the public domain: "Robertson, Richard (d.1578)". Dictionary of National Biography. London: Smith, Elder & Co. 1885–1900.
