= Patrick Heron (died 1761) =

Scottish politician

- Born: 1672
- Died: 22 October 1761
- Occupation: Politician

Patrick Heron (c. 1672 – 22 October 1761) was a Scottish politician.

== Career ==
He was the Member of Parliament (MP) for Kirkcudbright Stewartry from 1727 to 1741.

Patrick Heron was the heritor of the estate of Kirroughtree. As a landowner during the 1724 uprising of the Galloway Levellers he was instrumental in defusing a tense confrontation between Levellers and landowners.

Parliament of Great Britain
| Preceded by Alexander Murray | Member of Parliament for Kirkcudbright Stewartry; 1727–1741 | Succeeded by Basil Hamilton |
