= Kennedy baronets of Newtownmountkennedy (1665) =

The Kennedy baronetcy of Newtownmountkennedy was created in the Baronetage of Ireland on 25 January 1666 for Robert Kennedy, member of the Irish House of Commons for Kildare Borough.

The 2nd Baronet was a judge, Second Baron of the Irish Exchequer. On the death of the 4th Baronet in 1710 the next heir was under attainder and the baronetcy was consequently forfeited.

== Kennedy baronets, of Newtownmountkennedy (1665) ==
- Sir Robert Kennedy, 1st Baronet (died 1668)
- Sir Richard Kennedy, 2nd Baronet (died 1685)
- Sir Robert Kennedy, 3rd Baronet (c. 1650–1688)
- Sir Richard Kennedy, 4th Baronet (c. 1686–1710)
