= Prior of St Mary's Isle =

The Prior of St Mary's Isle (later Commendator of St Mary's Isle) was the head of the Augustinian monastic community of St Mary's Isle Priory, in Kirkcudbrightshire, Galloway. The following is a list of priors and commendators:

== List of priors ==
- William, x 1220
- David, 1273
- William de Kars, 1347
- Stephen de Malcarston, 1381-1406
- Patrick Wotherspoon, 1423-1426
  - John de Inverkeithing, 1423
  - Richard de Aberdour, 1424
  - Henry de Dryden, 1424-1426
- James Cameron, 1426-1446
- John de Wardlaw, 1446-1481
- Robert Bellenden (Ballantyne), 1481-1484
- John Crawford, 1484-1512 x 1515
  - William Crawford, 1501
- John Crichton, 1515-1525
- George Crichton, 1525-1526
- David Douglas, 1526
- William Douglas, 1526-1528
  - John Campbell, 1526
  - Adam Blackadder, 1527
  - John Lamb, 1528
  - John Leslie, 1528
  - Gavin Leslie, 1528
  - John Campbell (again), 1528
- Robert Erskine, 1528-1532

== List of commendators ==
- John Douglas, 1528-1536
- David de Voyles, 1530
- David Paniter, 1536-1547
  - Nicholas Williamson, 1536
- Robert Stirling, 1546-1558
- William Heslop, 1558
- Robert Richardson, 1558-1566
- John Wilson, 1558
- John Stevenson, 1561
- William Rutherford, 1566-1587

== Bibliography ==
- Cowan, Ian B. & Easson, David E., Medieval Religious Houses: Scotland With an Appendix on the Houses in the Isle of Man, Second Edition, (London, 1976), pp. 96-7
- Watt, D.E.R. & Shead, N.F. (eds.), The Heads of Religious Houses in Scotland from the 12th to the 16th Centuries, The Scottish Records Society, New Series, Volume 24, (Edinburgh, 2001), pp. 193-7

== See also ==
- Abbot of Holyrood
- St Mary's Isle Priory
