= Sir Richard Kennedy, 2nd Baronet =

Irish politician, landowner and judge

Sir Richard Kennedy, 2nd Baronet, of Newtownmountkennedy (c.1615–1685) was an Irish politician, landowner and judge who held the office of second Baron of the Court of Exchequer (Ireland). He was the second of the Kennedy Baronets of Newtownmountkennedy. His family gave their name to the village of Newtownmountkennedy in County Wicklow. He was notable though not unique among the Irish judges of his time for being of Gaelic descent.

== Background ==
He was the son of Sir Robert Kennedy, 1st Baronet, and his first wife Constance, eldest daughter of Jonas Sillyard. His father was a landowner and also an official of the Court of Exchequer. His mother's family were prominent in Dublin's municipal affairs. Sir Robert sat in the Irish House of Commons as member for Kildare Borough, and was noted for his hostility to Thomas Wentworth, 1st Earl of Strafford, the Lord Lieutenant of Ireland, who was virtually all-powerful in Ireland in the 1630s. Sir Robert came from a family of prosperous Dublin merchants; his brother was the wealthy and influential Alderman Walter Kennedy of Finnstown House, Lucan. The two brothers later became estranged over their religious differences.

== Career ==
Richard entered Lincoln's Inn in 1638, and was called to the English bar about 1645; he entered King's Inn in 1657. He was elected to the Irish House of Commons in 1647 (until 1649) as the member for Mullingar, and built up a successful legal career. His most notable case was his defence of Sir Phelim O'Neill on charges of treason in 1652: O'Neill was found guilty and executed. This is not a reflection on Kennedy's legal ability, since it is unlikely that the Government would have let O'Neill escape retribution in any circumstances.

== Judge ==
At the Restoration of Charles II Kennedy was spoken of as a possible Recorder of Dublin and was knighted; in the event, he became second Baron of the Exchequer instead. Given the Crown's long-standing preference for English judges, the appointment of an Irish-born judge of Gaelic descent caused some surprise, although James Donnellan, the Chief Justice of the Irish Common Pleas, was also Irish. However James Butler, 1st Duke of Ormonde, now Lord Lieutenant, was prepared to recommend Irish-born judges who were Protestants and had a record of loyalty to the Crown, and Kennedy passed both tests. Elrington Ball, rather cynically, notes that the Kennedys were rich, and that financial inducements may also have paid a part in Richard's elevation, since Charles II was perennially in need of funds. It is possible however that Ball had not seen the King's letter of 1662, increasing Kennedy's salary, as a just and proper reward for his labours. No doubt Ormonde had persuaded the King that the expense was justified.

His fee was originally set at £200 per annum. However in the 1662 Civil List the fees of several Irish High Court judges were raised to £300. The King wrote on 3 October 1662 directing that Kennedy should receive the same increase. His letter stresses Kennedy's merits, his dutiful and loyal affection to the Crown, and the great labour, cost and pains he was put to in ordering the Exchequer efficiently. The letter also stresses the importance of the Court itself to the Crown, in preventing fraud and increasing the Crown's revenue by all lawful means. It is clear that the Crown had a high opinion of Kennedy, and also that much of the everyday business of the Court (which the Crown regarded as the most important of the Courts of common law) fell on his shoulders. John Bysse, the Chief Baron of the Irish Exchequer, though popular and generally respected, was already showing signs of physical and possibly mental unfitness for office.

As a judge, Kennedy was frequently sent on assize to Ulster, where he showed a good deal of severity to religious dissenters, especially Quakers. He lobbied unsuccessfully to become Chief Justice of Common Pleas in 1665. In the same year, his father was made a baronet; Richard succeeded to the title three years later. He lived mainly at Newtownmountkennedy. Here about 1670 he built an impressive house (destroyed about 1690) where he entertained Ormonde; he also had houses at Ballydowd, near Lucan, and at Nicholas Street in Dublin city. His health began to fail in 1680, the year Chief Baron Bysse died; he retired the following year and died in 1685.

== Family ==
He married Anne Barker of Colnbrook, Berkshire; her father Christopher Barker was the grandson of Christopher Barker, Royal Printer to Elizabeth I. Her mother was Sarah Norton, daughter of Bonham Norton, a later Royal Printer and his wife Jane Owen. They were the parents of:

- Sir Robert Kennedy, 3rd Baronet.

Baronetage of Ireland
Preceded by Robert Kennedy	Baronet (of Newtownmountkennedy); 1668–1685	Succeeded by Robert Kennedy
