= Kennedy baronets =

Set index for Kennedy baronets

There have been five baronetcies created for persons with the surname Kennedy, one in the Baronetage of Ireland, three in the Baronetage of Nova Scotia and one in the Baronetage of the United Kingdom. One creation is extant as of 2026.

- Kennedy baronets of Newtownmountkennedy (1665)
- Kennedy baronets of Girvan (1673)
- Kennedy baronets of Culzean (1682)
- Kennedy baronets of Clowburn (1698)
- Kennedy baronets of Johnstown Kennedy (1836)
