= John Kennedy, 8th Earl of Cassilis =

Scottish peer

John Kennedy, 8th Earl of Cassillis (April 1700 – 7 August 1759) was a Scottish peer. He succeeded to the titles of 10th Lord Kennedy and 8th Earl of Cassillis on 23 July 1701.

== Early life ==
Kennedy was born in April 1700. He was the only son of John Kennedy, Lord Kennedy (c. 1672–1700) and his wife Elizabeth Hutchinson (c. 1668–1734). As his father predeceased his grandfather, John inherited the earldom in 1701 upon the death of his grandfather.

His maternal grandparents were Charles Hutchinson, MP for Nottingham, and the former Isabella Boteler (a daughter of Sir Francis Boteler). His paternal grandparents were John Kennedy, 7th Earl of Cassillis.

== Career ==
He held the office of Governor of Dumbarton Castle between 1737 and 1759.

== Personal life ==
On 24 October 1738, Lord Cassillis married Lady Susan Hamilton, daughter of John Hamilton, 1st Earl of Ruglen. Her elder sister became Anne Hamilton, 2nd Countess of Ruglen.

On the death of the 8th Earl, a competition arose, both for the estates and for the title of Earl of Cassillis, between William, Earl of March and Ruglen, heir general, and Sir Thomas Kennedy of Culzean, 4th Baronet, the heir male. The Court of Session found the right to the estates to be in the latter, 29 February 1760; and the same was found with regard to the title on a reference to the House of Lords, 27 January 1762.

Peerage of Scotland
Preceded by John Kennedy	Earl of Cassilis; 1701–1759	Succeeded by Thomas Kennedy
