= Kennedy baronets of Culzean (1682) =

Escutcheon of the Kennedy baronets of Culzean

The Kennedy baronetcy, of Culzean in the County of Ayr, was created in the Baronetage of Nova Scotia on 8 December 1682 for Archibald Kennedy. He was the great-grandson of Sir Thomas Kennedy, Master of Cassilis, younger son of Gilbert Kennedy, 3rd Earl of Cassillis. The 4th Baronet succeeded to the earldom of Cassillis in 1759.

Susanna, Countess of Eglinton, daughter of the 1st Baronet, was a celebrated beauty and literary patron.

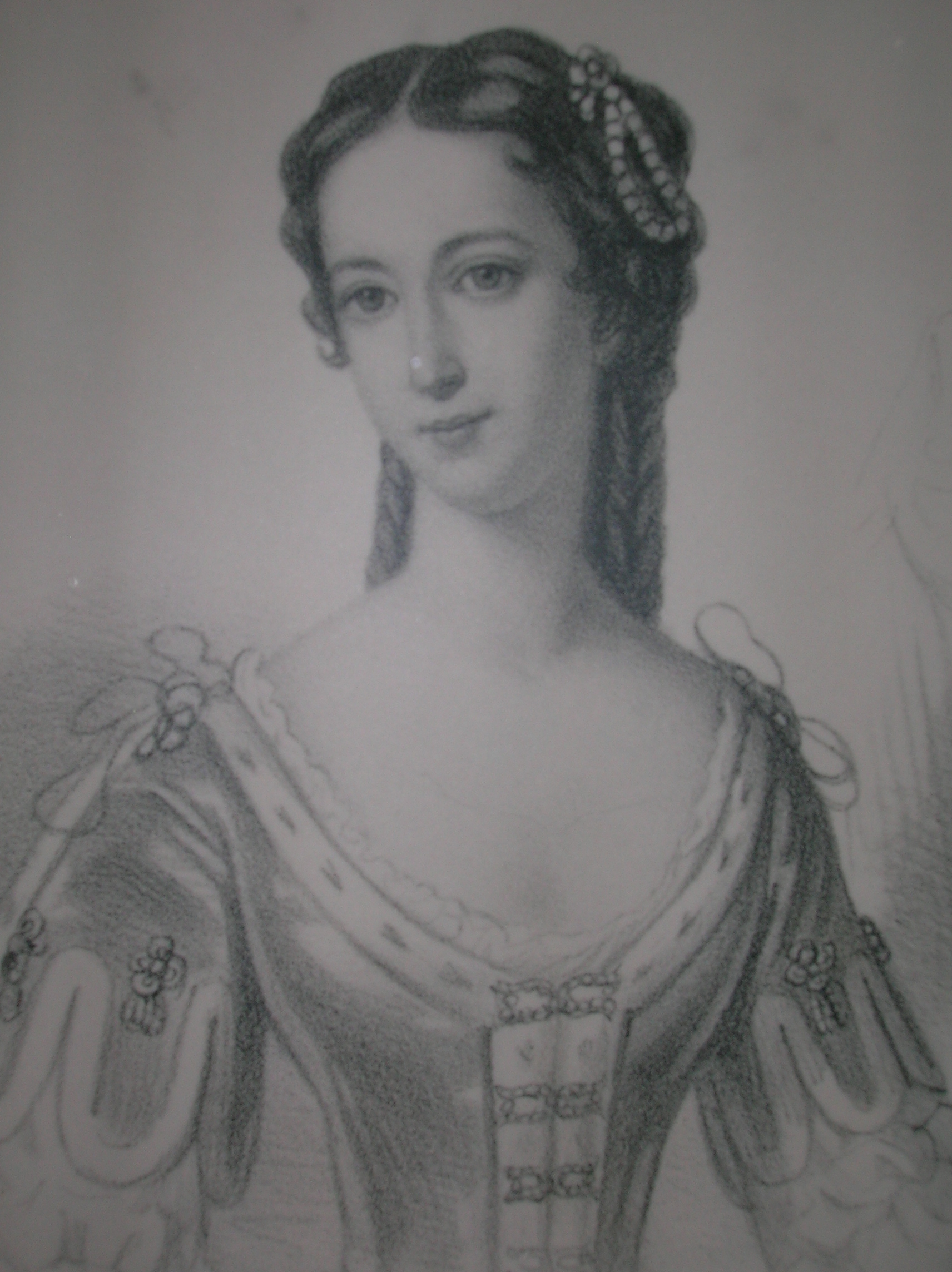
Susanna Montgomery, Countess of Eglinton, daughter of Sir Archibald Kennedy, 1st Baronet, of Culzean

== Kennedy baronets, of Culzean (1682) ==
- Sir Archibald Kennedy, 1st Baronet (died 1710)
- Sir John Kennedy, 2nd Baronet (died 1742)
- Sir John Kennedy, 3rd Baronet (died 1744)
- Sir Thomas Kennedy, 4th Baronet, later became the 9th Earl of Cassillis (died 1775, unmarried)

The baronetcy remained a subsidiary title of the earldom, until the baronetcy became extinct in 1792. See Marquess of Ailsa for further history of the baronetcy.
