= Kennedy baronets of Girvan (1673) =

Escutcheon of the Kennedy baronets of Girvan

The Kennedy baronetcy, of Girvan in the County of Ayr, Scotland, was created in the Baronetage of Nova Scotia on 4 August 1673 for John Kennedy. The title became extinct on the death of the 2nd Baronet in 1740. The background of the Kennedys of Girvanmains was given in 1847 by James Paterson, with Cokayne stating that John Kennedy was the grandson of Gilbert Kennedy.

== Kennedy baronets, of Girvan (1673) ==
- Sir John Kennedy, 1st Baronet (died c. 1700)
- Sir Gilbert Kennedy, 2nd Baronet (died 1740)
