= Thomas Kennedy, 9th Earl of Cassilis =

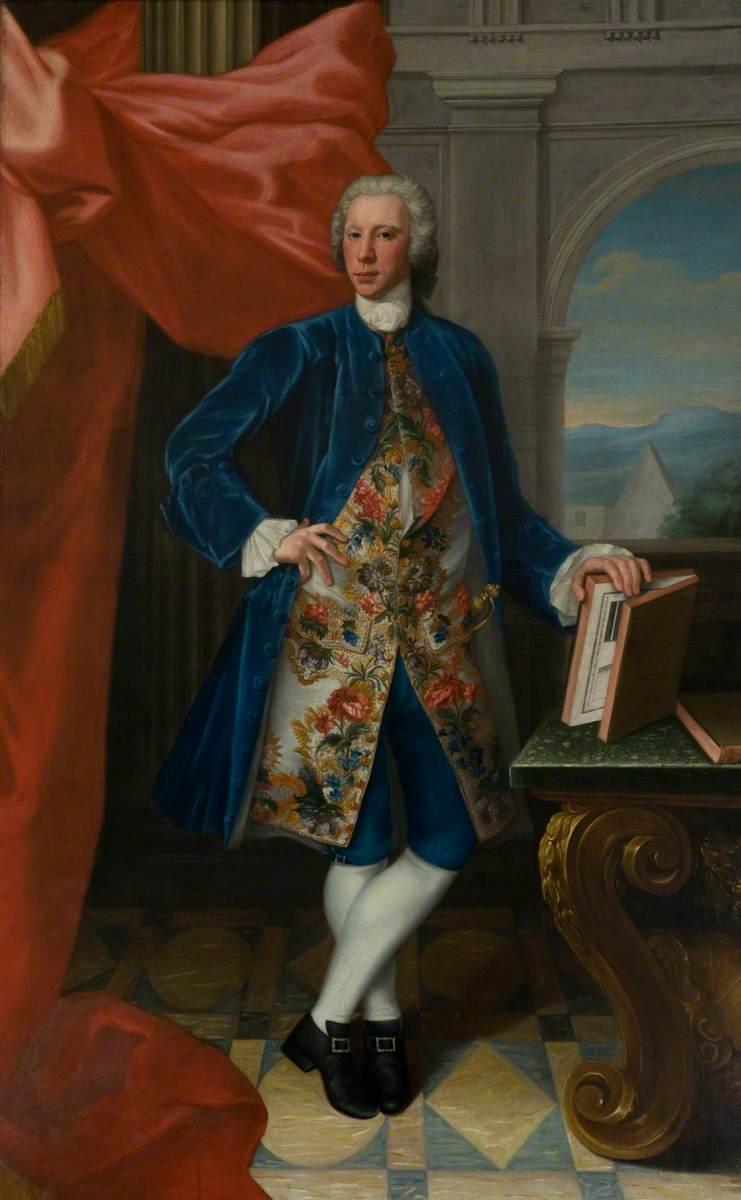
A painting of Thomas Kennedy

Thomas Kennedy, 9th Earl of Cassillis (12 February 1726 – 30 November 1775) was a British Army officer and baronet who later became a Scottish peer and landowner.

The second son of Sir John Kennedy, 2nd Baronet of Culzean, and his wife Jane Douglas, who together had no fewer than twenty children, Kennedy inherited the baronetcy and the Culzean estate on his elder brother's death in 1744. Following the death of his kinsman John Kennedy, 8th Earl of Cassilis, on 7 August 1759, he made a claim to the earldom and estates of Cassilis which succeeded in the House of Lords on 27 January 1762, when it resolved "that he had a right to the title and dignity of Earl of Cassilis, as heir male of David, 1st earl; and to the title of Lord Kennedy, as heir of Gilbert, 1st lord."

From November 1774 until his death in November 1775, Cassilis was a Scottish representative peer, with a seat in the House of Lords.

Cassilis died unmarried in 1775, at Culzean Castle, and was succeeded by his brother David Kennedy.

== Notes ==
Peerage of Scotland
Preceded by John Kennedy	Earl of Cassilis; 1759–1775	Succeeded by David Kennedy
Baronetage of Nova Scotia
Preceded by Sir John Kennedy	Kennedy Baronet (of Culzean); 1744–1775	Succeeded by David Kennedy
