= Kenneth Mackenzie of Suddie =

Scottish soldier

Captain Kenneth Mackenzie, 2nd of Suddie was a Scottish soldier who was killed at the Battle of Mulroy in 1688 whilst commanding Government troops against rebel Scottish clans.

== Lineage ==
He was the son of Alexander Mackenzie, 1st of Suddie and his wife Mary, daughter of Mr Bruce of Airth. He belonged to the Clan Mackenzie.

== Career ==
Kenneth Mackenzie of Suddie served as a Captain in Dumbarton's Regiment in France in 1666, and later as a Royalist in Scotland. He was made commander of an Independent Highland Company raised to help keep order in the Highlands on behalf of the Scottish Government, and in 1685, had received instructions from the Privy Council of Scotland to step-up more aggressive and punitive action against the caterans and broken men. They had been so successful in this task that it was recommended that another Independent Highland Company should be set up to help keep the peace in the south. In 1688, the Privy Council ordered Mackenzie of Suddie and his company to support Mackintosh of Mackintosh in his feud against MacDonald of Keppoch. He was killed fighting against the MacDonalds in the subsequent Battle of Mulroy in August 1688, and his Independent Highland Company suffered very heavy losses.

== Family ==
Kenneth Mackenzie of Suddie had married Isobel, daughter of John Paterson, Bishop of Ross and had the following children:

1. Kenneth Mackenzie, 3rd of Suddie, heir and successor.
2. George Mackenzie, who was killed during the failed Darien scheme.
3. Margaret Mackenzie, who married as his first wife, Colonel Alexander Mackenzie of Conansbay, son of Kenneth Mackenzie, 3rd Earl of Seaforth, chief of Clan Mackenzie.
4. Alice Mackenzie who married firstly, in 1698, John Macdonald of Balcony, only son of Sir James Macdonald, chief of the Clan Macdonald of Sleat. Alice married secondly, John Maclean who was a medical doctor in Inverness.

== Independent Highland Company ==
List of men in Kenneth Mackenzie's Independent Highland Company, 16 June 1682 (written on parchment)

Captain

- Kennth Mackenzie of Suddie

Lieutenant

- William Scharp

Ensign

- Cristofar McDougall

Segeants

- John Bogie
- William Frazer

Corporals

- John McIntosh
- William McCloude
- Robert Alliss

Drummers

- William Gray
- Adrow Hamiltoun

Private men

- Allexander Ogilvie
- Allexander Hetherweick
- Allexander Baine
- Allexander Duncan
- Allexander Masone
- Allexander Fraiser
- Allexander Sutherland
- Allexander Polsone
- Androw Monroe
- Androw Thomsone
- Androw Lauchland
- Androw McStiven
- Archibald McCroe
- Duncan Moore
- David Allon
- David Ross
- David Donaldsone
- David Tailzior
- David Melvill
- David Hendersone
- Duncan Cragie
- Duncan Forbis
- Donald Monroe
- Donald Gunn
- Duncan Tailzior
- Donald McKenzie
- Donald Clark
- Duncan Taise
- Dugall Campbell
- Dougall Livingstoune
- Edward Douglass
- Georg Allon
- Georg Cuningham
- Georg Henderson
- Georg Steill
- Gaven Douglas
- Gilbert Dundass
- Hew Sunderland
- John Grant (elder)
- John Grant (younger)
- John McClean (elder)
- John McClean (younger)
- John Cambell
- John McGreiger
- John Grecie
- John Garland
- John McKeaddie
- John McIntosh
- John Gordon
- John Camron
- John Cristie
- John Castella
- John Chapman
- John Bruice
- John Robertson
- John Clark
- John Robertsone (younger)
- John McCale
- James Ross
- James Peitrikin
- James Frazer (elder)
- James Frazer (younger)
- James Dickson
- James Merchall
- James Hodge
- Kenneth McKenzie (elder)
- Kenneth McKenzie (younger)
- Lauchland McIntosh
- Neill McMillon
- Patrick Lawsone
- Patrick Cokburne
- Robert Chisholm
- Robert Adamsone
- Robert Davidsone
- Robert Hendrie
- Robert Graye
- Rorie Chisholm
- Thomas Dicksone
- Thomas Duncan
- Thomas Leadcoat
- Thomas Wilsone
- William Slouan
- William Forbis
- William McIntosh
- William Foullar
- William Paull
- William Robertson
- William McDonald
- William McViccar
- William Wheallie

== See also ==
- Thomas Mackenzie of Pluscarden
- Hector Roy Mackenzie
