= Baldoon Castle =

Castle in Dumfries and Galloway, Scotland

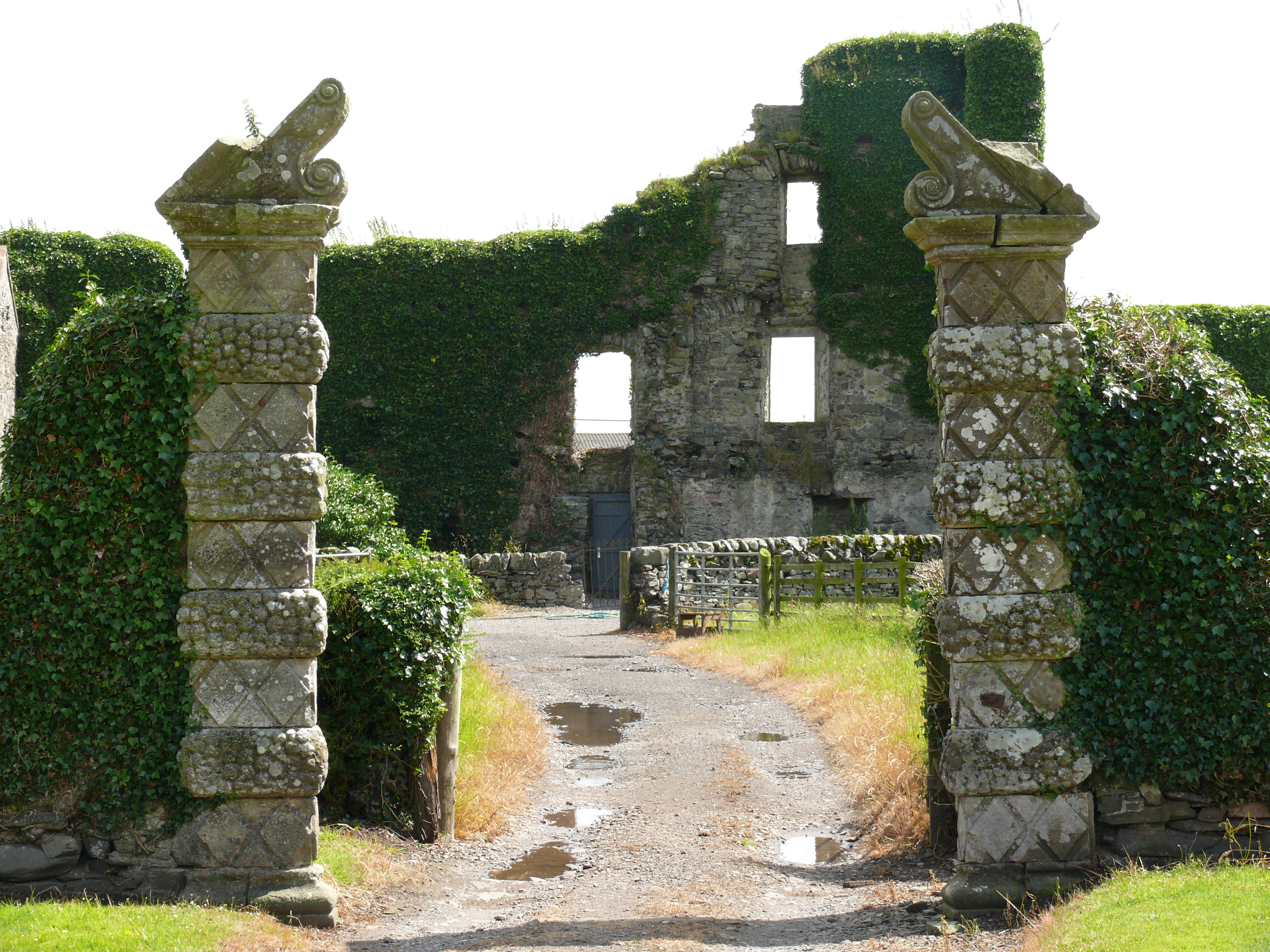
- The ruins in 2010
- Interactive map of the Baldoon Castle area

General information
- Status: Ruins
- Type: Castle
- Architectural style: Renaissance (gateway)
- Classification: Category A Listed building
- Location: 1.5 miles (2.4 km) south west of Wigtown, south of the river Bladnoch, Wigtown, Scotland
- Year built: 16th century
- Owner: Dunbars of Westfield (1533–34 onwards, for almost three centuries)

Design and construction
- Designations: Category A Listed building (gate piers)
- Known for: Inspiration for The Bride of Lammermoor and Lucia di Lammermoor; ghost legend of Janet Dalrymple
- Originally gifted by King James V to Archibald Duncan

Baldoon Castle was a 16th-century castle about 1.5 miles (2.4 km) south west of Wigtown, Dumfries and Galloway, Scotland, south of the river Bladnoch.

== History ==
The Dunbars of Westfield owned the property for almost three centuries from 1533-34. It was a gift from King James V to Archibald Duncan.

== Structure ==
Little remains of the castle: only a length of the south wall with the springing of at least three walls on its north face, and the remains of an entrance gateway lying 50 metres (160 ft) to the north. The gateway dates from the 17th century, and are described as a good example of Renaissance work.

The gate piers which were part of the entrance to the castle with bands of stylised rock-faced rustication alternating with lozenges. They are topped by cornices and moulded scroll caps.

The gate piers are registered as a Category A Listed Building.

== Tradition ==
It is said that the ghost of Janet Dalrymple of Carscreugh haunts the ruin, in a bloodied wedding dress. Janet was forced to marry Sir David Dunbar of Carscreugh Castle although she had fallen in love with another man, the impoverished Archibald 3rd Lord Rutherfurd. She either was murdered on her wedding night or died insane shortly afterward.

The story is the basis for both Sir Walter Scott’s The Bride of Lammermoor and Gaetano Donizetti’s opera Lucia di Lammermoor.

== Gallery ==
Gateway, Baldoon Castle, 1912

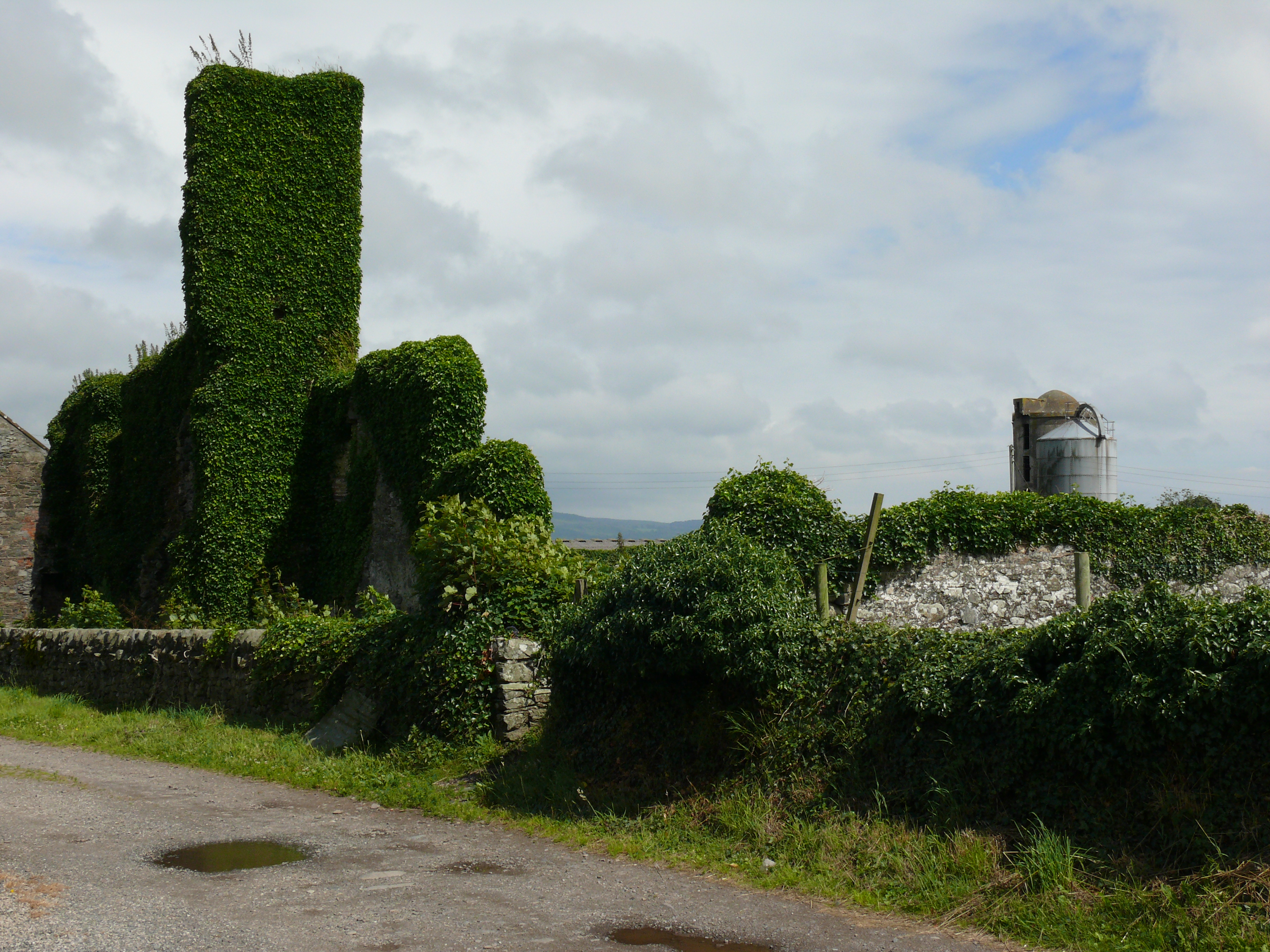
