= William Douglas, 4th Duke of Queensberry =

British peer and courtier (1724–1810)

His Grace The Duke of Queensberry KT
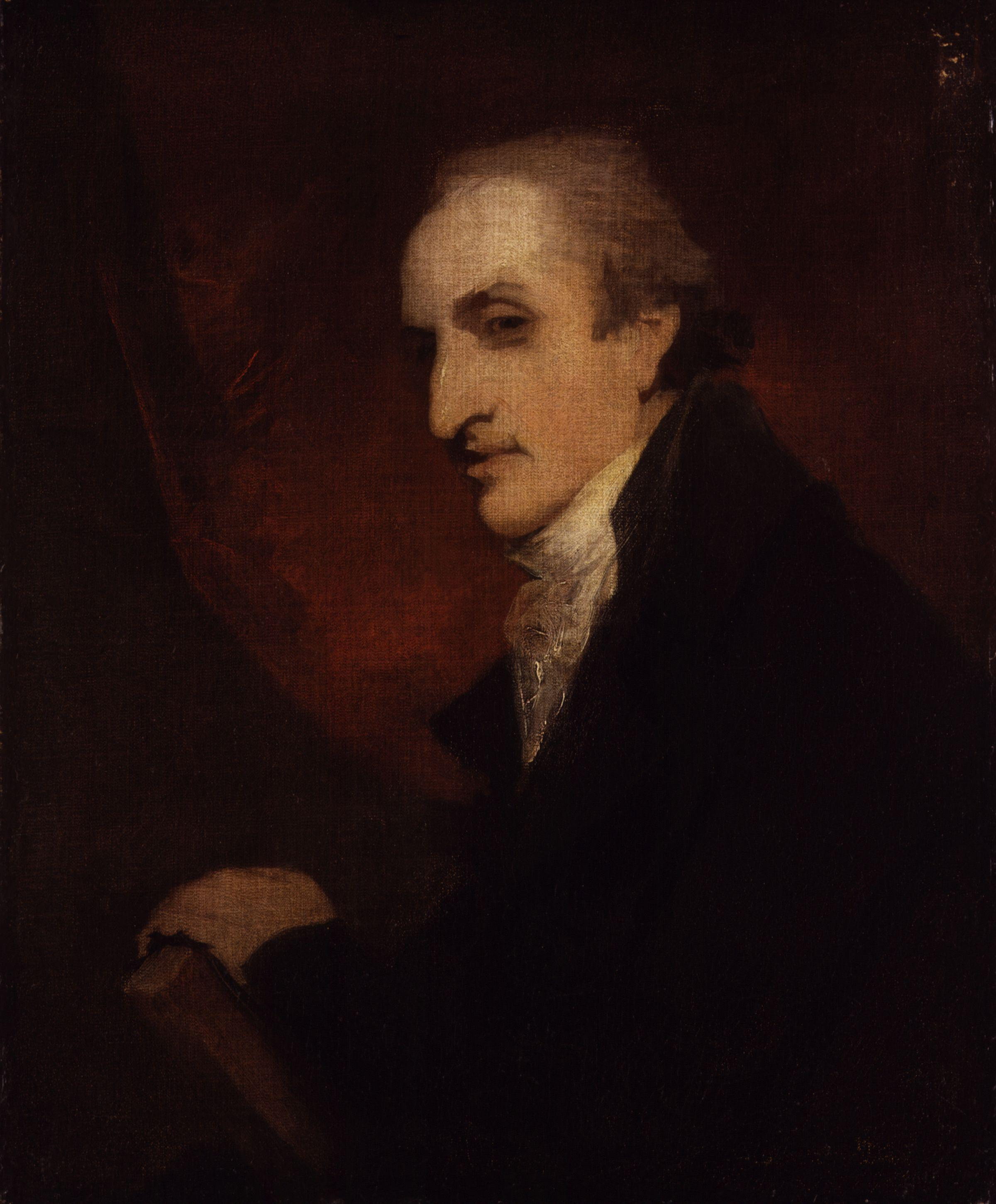
- Portrait by John Opie, c. 1785–1790
- Born: 16 December 1724; Peebles, Scotland
- Died: 23 December 1810 (aged 86); London, England
- Occupations: Landowner; racehorse owner; House of Lords representative peer
- Children: Maria Seymour-Conway, Marchioness of Hertford (illegitimate)
- Parent(s): William Douglas, 2nd Earl of March; Lady Anne Hamilton

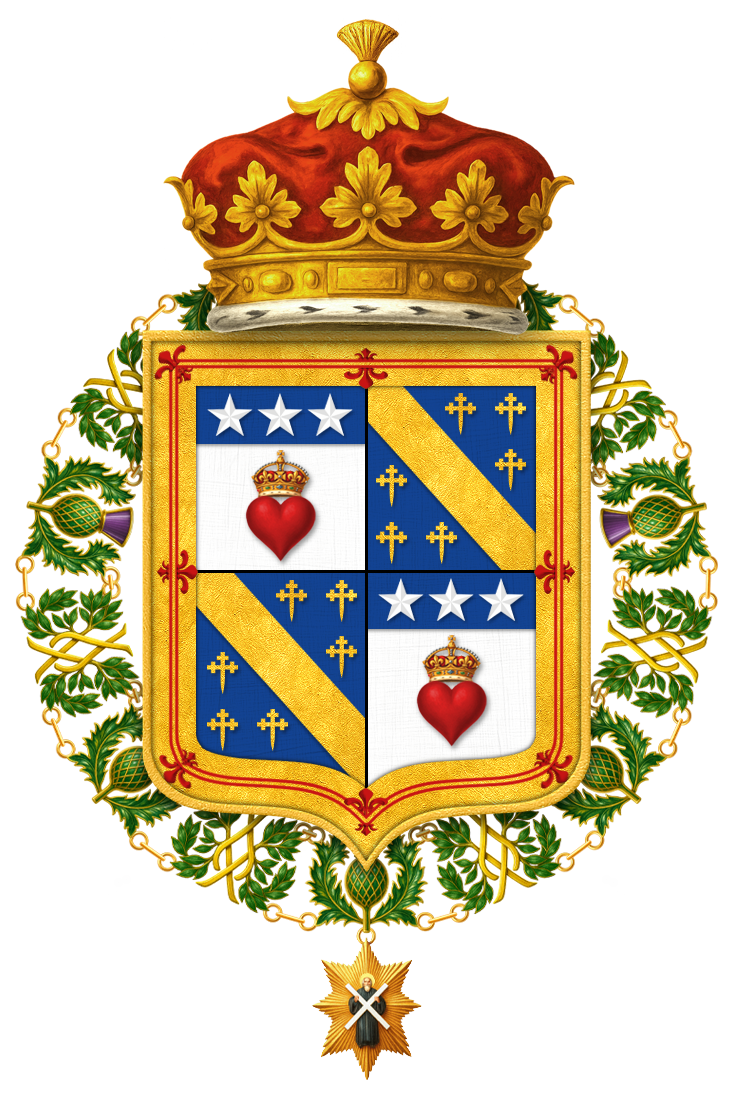
Shield of arms of William Douglas, 4th Duke of Queensberry, KT

William Douglas, 4th Duke of Queensberry, KT (16 December 1724 – 23 December 1810) was a British peer and courtier. He was popularly known as Old Q (because that letter was painted on his carriage's door) and was reputed as a high-stakes gambler. In 1799 he was estimated the eighth-wealthiest man (or small family unit) in Britain, owning £1M (equivalent to £98,800,000 in 2025). He is one of ten known British millionaires that year, the royal family excluded.

== Family and royal appointee ==
Born in Peebles, Queensberry was the only son of William Douglas, 2nd Earl of March, and his wife, Lady Anne Hamilton. He was great-grandson of the 1st Duke.

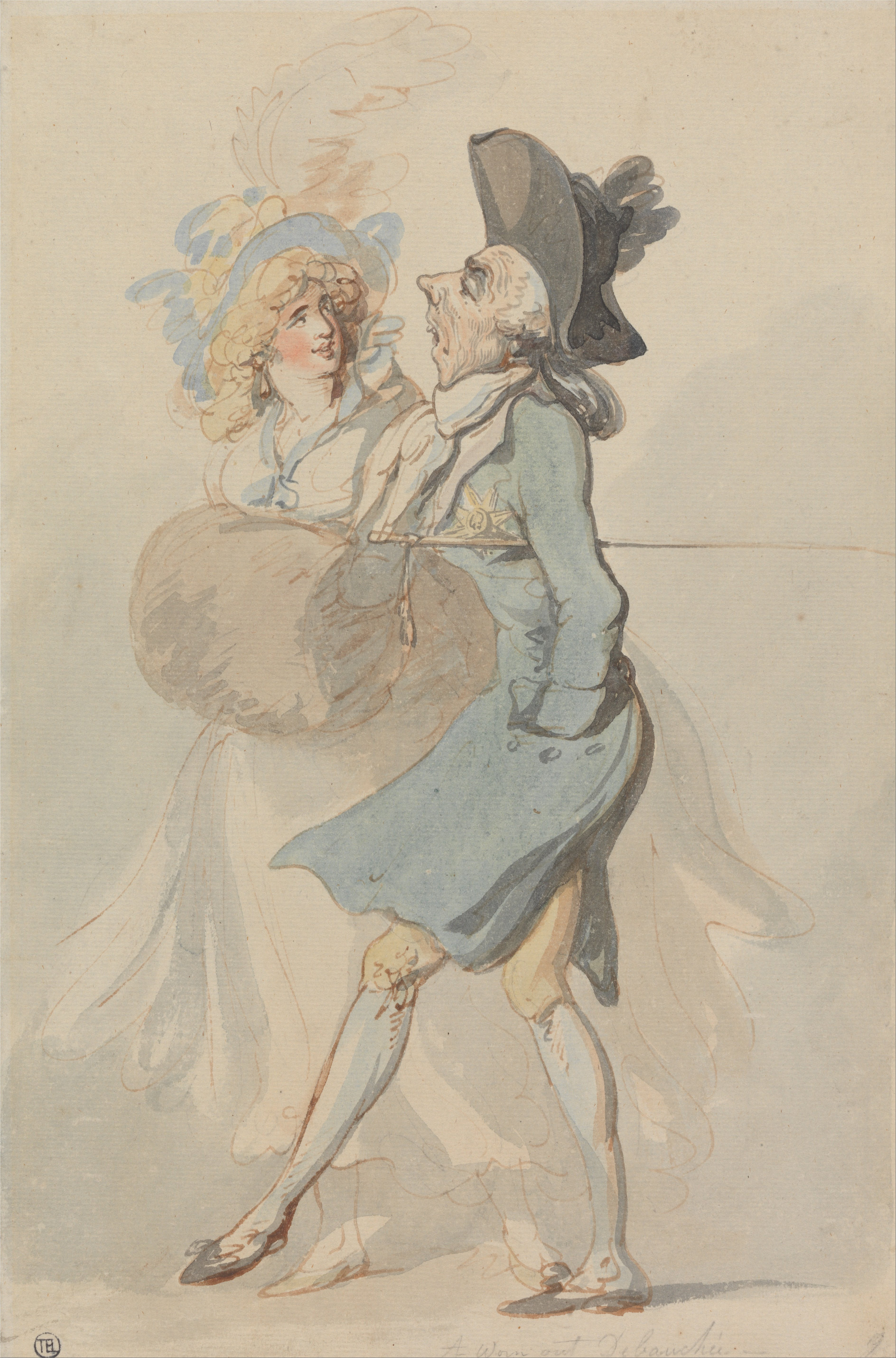
William Douglas, 4th Duke of Queensbury

A friend of the Prince of Wales, the future George III, Douglas was appointed Gentleman of the Bedchamber to him when he became king in 1760. He was appointed a Knight of the Thistle in 1761 and was one of the 16 Scottish representative peers for an elected term or possibly more from 1761, and was Vice Admiral of Scotland from 1767 to 1776. However, due to behavior during the king's unusual, long-lasting, mental health latter-life illness he was deprived of his office as Gentleman of the Bedchamber in 1789, and for a while took refuge abroad. Later, he was Lord Lieutenant of Dumfries from 1794 until 1810.

He succeeded his father in the Earldom of March in 1731 and his mother in the Earldom of Ruglen in 1748. He succeeded his cousin Charles as Duke of Queensberry in 1778, and was created Lord Douglas, Baron Douglas, of Amesbury in the County of Wiltshire in the Peerage of Great Britain on 8 August 1786.

In 1799 he was estimated the eighth-wealthiest man (or small family unit) in Britain, owning £1M (equivalent to £98,800,000 in 2025). He was one of ten known British millionaires in 1799.

He developed a strong passion for Miss Frances Pelham at the age of 28, so much so that he deliberately bought a house next door to her and had a bow window built so that he could sit and spy on her as she came and went. In his 60s he proposed to the teenage daughter of his next-door neighbour in Piccadilly on three occasions, but was turned down despite his immense wealth.

Queensberry never married. He had a daughter, Maria "Mie-Mie" Fagnani, by a mistress, the Marchesa Fagnani. In 1798, she became the wife of the 3rd Marquess of Hertford; Queensberry left much of his wealth to Maria, and left £10,000 to Lady Anne Hamilton who was a Lady in Waiting to Caroline of Brunswick. He was interred at St James's Church, Piccadilly on 31 December 1810.

On his death, the dukedom and Drumlanrig Castle passed to his second cousin once removed, the third Duke of Buccleuch. The Marquessate of Queensberry passed to his fourth cousin once removed (and also third once removed) Sir Charles Douglas, 5th Bt, whose descendant is the current titleholder. His second cousin twice removed Francis Douglas, 8th Earl of Wemyss became Earl of Wemyss and March. The Earldom of Ruglen became extinct.

== Horseracing ==
He was a racehorse owner and event attendee. His jockeys' racing silks were deep red with a black cap. He had some society repute as a high-stakes gambler.

=== Semi-fictional portrayal ===
As "Lord March", he is briefly portrayed or described in William Makepeace Thackeray's novel The Virginians as a dissolute gambler.

Political offices
Preceded by John Carmichael	Vice-Admiral of Scotland; 1767–1776	Succeeded by John Campbell
Honorary titles
New office	Lord Lieutenant of Dumfries; 1794–1797	Succeeded by Earl of Dalkeith
Peerage of Scotland
Preceded by Charles Douglas	Duke of Queensberry; 1778–1810	Succeeded by Henry Scott
Preceded by Charles Douglas	Marquess of Queensberry; 1778–1810	Succeeded by Charles Douglas
Preceded by William Douglas	Earl of March; 1731–1810	Succeeded by Francis Douglas
Preceded by Anne Hamilton	Earl of Ruglen; 1748–1810	Extinct
