= William Hamilton, Duke of Hamilton =

Scottish politician (1634–1694)

His Grace The Duke of Hamilton KG PC
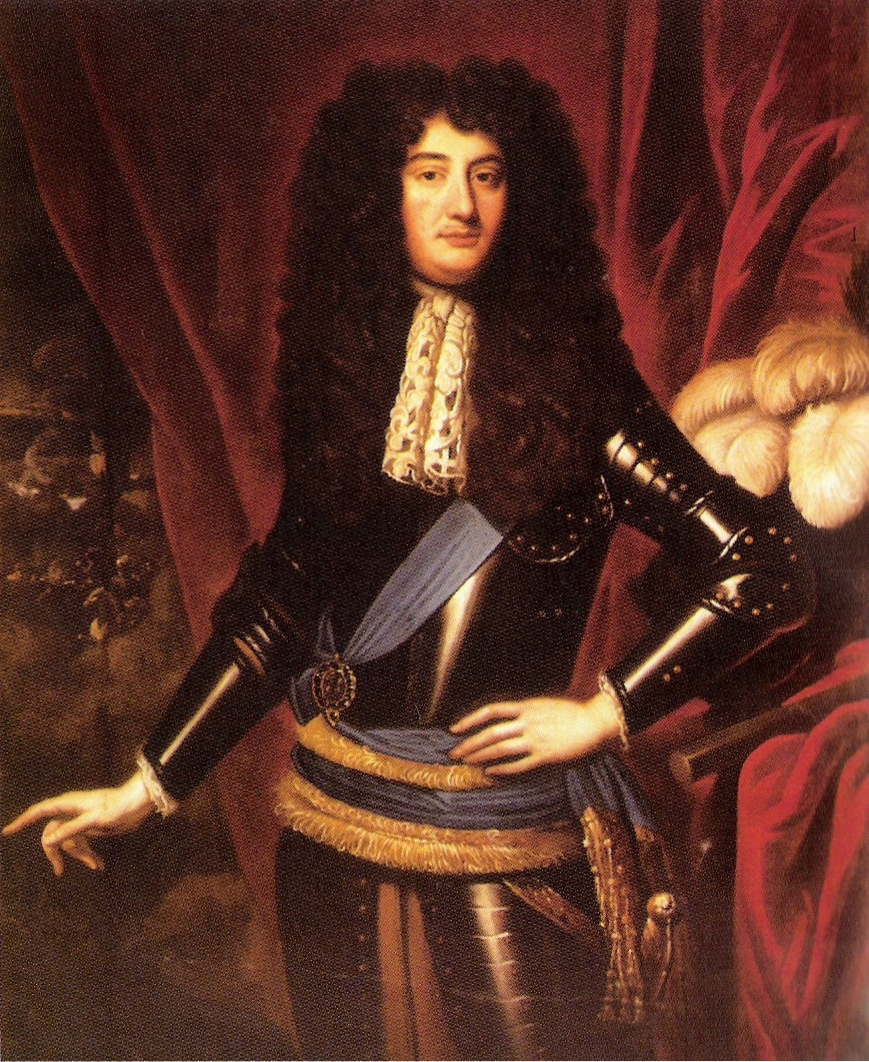
- Portrait by Godfrey Kneller

Lord High Commissioner
- In office 1693–1694
- Monarchs: William II and Mary II
- Preceded by: The Earl of Melville
- Succeeded by: The Marquess of Tweeddale
- In office 1689–1690
- Monarchs: William II and Mary II
- Preceded by: The Earl of Moray
- Succeeded by: The Earl of Melville

Personal details
- Born: 23 December 1634
- Died: 18 April 1694 (aged 59) Palace of Holyroodhouse, Edinburgh, Scotland
- Resting place: Hamilton Collegiate Church, Hamilton Mausoleum, Bent Cemetery, Hamilton, South Lanarkshire
- Spouse: Anne Hamilton, 3rd Duchess of Hamilton
- Children: Lady Mary Hamilton; James Hamilton, 4th Duke of Hamilton; Lord William Hamilton; Lady Anna Hamilton; Catherine Murray, Countess of Atholl; Charles Douglas, 2nd Earl of Selkirk; John Hamilton, 3rd Earl of Selkirk; George Hamilton, 1st Earl of Orkney; Susan Hay, Marchioness of Tweeddale; Margaret Maule, Countess of Panmure; Lady Anna Hamilton; Lord Basil Hamilton; Lord Archibald Hamilton
- Parents: William Douglas, 1st Marquess of Douglas; Lady Mary Gordon

William Douglas-Hamilton, Duke of Hamilton (24 December 1634 – 18 April 1694), also known as Lord William Douglas and the Earl of Selkirk, was a Scottish politician. He was the eldest son of the 1st Marquess of Douglas by his second wife, Lady Mary Gordon, a daughter of the 1st Marquess of Huntly. Subsequent to marrying Anne Hamilton, 3rd Duchess of Hamilton, he was created Duke of Hamilton in the Peerage of Scotland, which also allowed him to use his wife's subsidiary titles during his lifetime and to take the name Hamilton for their descendants.

== Early life and marriage ==
Lord William Douglas was created Earl of Selkirk in 1646, at the age of 11. He supported the Royalist cause in the Wars of the Three Kingdoms and was fined £,1000, under the terms of the English Commonwealth's Act of Pardon and Grace to the People of Scotland.

On April 29, 1656, he married Anne Hamilton, Duchess of Hamilton. She was from a staunchly Royalist dynasty. Her estates had been declared forfeit by Oliver Cromwell after the activities of her father and uncle in the Wars of the Three Kingdoms. Her father, James, 1st Duke of Hamilton, was executed by the English in 1649 at the end of the Second English Civil War, and her uncle, William, 2nd Duke of Hamilton, died following the Battle of Worcester in 1651.

== Restoration ==
After the Restoration, he was created Duke of Hamilton in 1660 on the petition of his wife, Anne Hamilton, suo jure Duchess of Hamilton, receiving also several of the other Hamilton peerages for life.

He supported the Duke of Lauderdale in the early stages of his Scottish policy, in which he adopted a moderate attitude towards the Presbyterians. However, the two were soon alienated through the influence of the Countess of Dysart, according to Gilbert Burnet, who spent much time at Hamilton Palace in arranging the Hamilton family's archives. With other Scottish noblemen who resisted Lauderdale's measures, he was twice summoned to London to present his case at court, but without obtaining any result.

He was dismissed from the Privy Council in 1676, and on a subsequent visit to London, Charles II refused to receive him. On the accession of James II, he received numerous honours, but he was one of the first to enter into communication with William III of Orange.

He presided over the Convention of Edinburgh, summoned at his request, which offered the Scottish crown to William III and Mary II in March 1689. His death took place at Holyrood Palace on 18 April 1694. His wife survived until 17 April 1716.

== Children ==
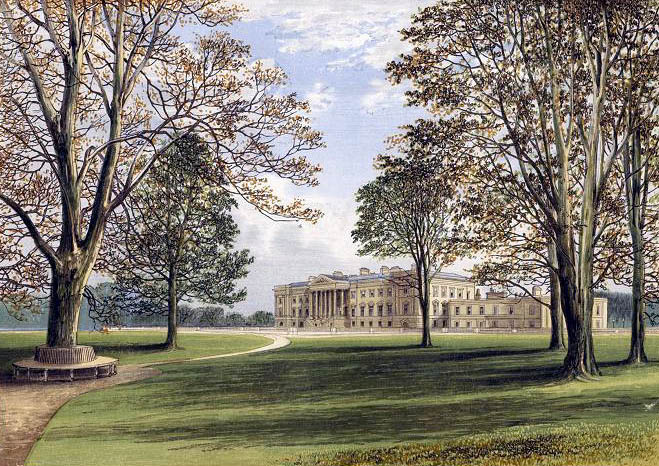
Hamilton Palace

He was married to Anne Hamilton, 3rd Duchess of Hamilton, who bore eleven children by him. He adopted the surname Douglas-Hamilton and the Hamilton arms, and his children bore the surname Hamilton.

- Lady Mary Hamilton (1657–July 1666), who died young.
- James Hamilton, 4th Duke of Hamilton (1658–1712)
- Lord William Hamilton (1659–1681)
- Lady Catherine Hamilton (1662–1707), who married 1st Duke of Atholl.
- Charles Douglas, 2nd Earl of Selkirk (c. 1662-c. 1739)
- John Hamilton, 3rd Earl of Selkirk, 1st Earl of Ruglen (c. 1664–1744)
- George Hamilton, 1st Earl of Orkney (1666–1737)
- Lady Susannah Hamilton (1667–1737), who married John Cochrane, 2nd Earl of Dundonald. After his death, she married Charles Hay, 3rd Marquess of Tweeddale.
- Lady Margaret Hamilton (1668–1731), who married James Maule, 4th Earl of Panmure.
- Lord Basil Hamilton (1671–1701), drowned at age 30.
- Lord Archibald Hamilton (1673–1754), an officer of the Royal Navy who married Lady Jane Hamilton (a daughter of the 6th Earl of Abercorn).

== Notes ==
Parliament of Scotland
| Preceded by The Earl of Moray | Lord High Commissioner; 1689 | Succeeded by The Lord Melville |
| Preceded by The Earl of Melville | Lord High Commissioner; 1693 | Succeeded by The Marquess of Tweeddale |
Peerage of Scotland
| New title | Earl of Selkirk; 1646–1690 | Succeeded by Charles Douglas |
| Preceded by Anne Hamilton | Duke of Hamilton; 1660–1694 (as husband of Anne Hamilton) | Succeeded by Anne Hamilton |
