= James Hamilton, 7th Earl of Abercorn =

Irish and Scottish peer (1686–1744)

James Hamilton
- Earl of Abercorn
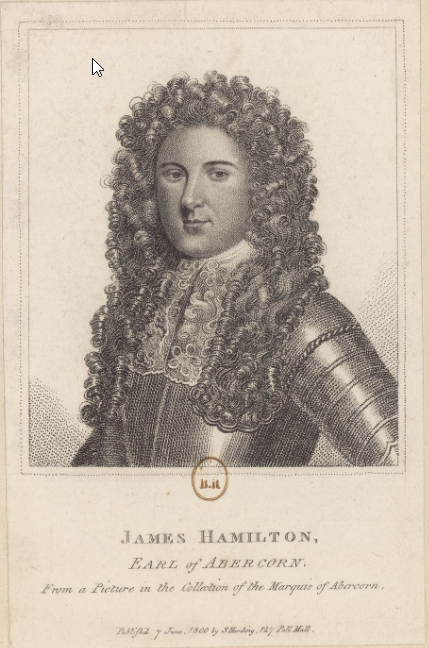
- Detail from portrait below
- Tenure: 1734–1744
- Predecessor: James, 6th Earl of Abercorn
- Successor: James, 8th Earl of Abercorn
- Born: 22 March 1686
- Died: 11 January 1744 (aged 57); Cavendish Square, London
- Buried: Westminster Abbey
- Spouse: Anne Plumer
- Issue Detail: James, John & others
- Father: James Hamilton
- Mother: Elizabeth Reading

James Hamilton, 7th Earl of Abercorn FRS PC PC (Ire) (1686–1744), styled Lord Paisley from 1701 to 1734, was a Scottish and Irish nobleman and peer. An amateur scientist and musician, he published a book on magnetism in 1729 and a treatise on musical harmony in 1730, which was subsequently emended and re-issued by his teacher, Dr. Pepusch.

== Birth and origins ==
James was born on 22 March 1686, the second but eldest surviving son of James Hamilton and his wife Elizabeth Reading. His father was at the time the representant of a cadet branch of the Earls of Abercorn that descended from George Hamilton, 1st Baronet of Donalong, the fourth son of the 1st Earl but would later succeed a cousin as the 6th Earl of Abercorn. The Abercorn Hamiltons had come from Scotland to Ireland during the Plantation of Ulster.

James's mother was the only surviving child of Sir Robert Reading, 1st Baronet, of Dublin. His parents were Protestants. They had married in January 1684. He was one of 14 siblings, who are listed in his father's article.

Family tree

James Hamilton with wife, parents, and other selected relatives. (Note: This family tree is partly derived from the Abercorn pedigree pictured in Cokayne. Also see the lists of siblings and children in the text.)

James; 1st Earl; 1575–1618	Marion; Boyd d. 1632; Recusant
James; 2nd Earl d. c. 1670	Claud; 2nd Baron; Strabane d. 1638	George; 1st Baronet. Donalong c. 1608 – 1679
George; 3rd Earl c. 1636 – bef. 1683	James; 3rd Baron; Strabane; 1633–1655	George; 4th Baron; Strabane; 1636/7 – 1668	James d. 1673 d.v.p.*
Claud; 4th Earl; 1659–1691	Charles; 5th Earl d. 1701	James; 6th Earl c. 1661 – 1734	Elizabeth; Reading d. 1754
James; 7th Earl; 1686–1744	Anne; Plumer; 1690–1776
James; 8th Earl; 1712–1789	John; Hamilton; 1714–1755	Harriet; Eliot d. 1769
John; 1st Marquess; 1756–1818	Catherine; Copley died 1791

Legend

XXX	Subject of the article	XXX	Earls of Abercorn	XXX	Barons; Strabane

*d.v.p. = predeceased his father (decessit vita patris)

== Early life ==
While James Hamilton was a young child, his father fought for King William in the Williamite War in Ireland and brought provisions to Derry just before the Siege of Derry.

In 1701 the main line of the Abercorns failed when Charles Hamilton, 5th Earl of Abercorn died childless in Strabane, Ireland. Charles's nearest living male relative was Hamilton's father, Charles's second cousin (see Family tree). His father therefore succeeded as the 6th Earl of Abercorn, and Hamilton, aged 15, became the new Earl's heir apparent with the courtesy title of Lord Paisley. At the same time as Earl of Abercorn in Scotland, his father succeeded as the 7th Baron of Strabane in Ireland. About six months later, on 2 December 1701, his father, Lord Abercorn, was rewarded with the new Irish titles. The King advanced him from Baron Strabane to Viscount Strabane and gave him the additional subsidiary title of Baron Mountcastle.

== Marriage and children ==
In April 1711, Lord Paisley, as he now was, married Anne Plumer (1690–1776), daughter of Colonel John Plumer of Ware, Hertfordshire.

James and Anne had six sons and two daughters:

1. James (1712–1789), succeeded him as 8th Earl of Abercorn
2. John (c. 1714 – 1755), Captain in the Royal Navy, father of the John Hamilton, 1st Marquess of Abercorn
3. William, died young
4. Anne (1715–1792), married Sir Henry Mackworth, 6th Baronet and had issue
5. George (1718–1787), Canon of Windsor, married Elizabeth Onslow (d. 1800), daughter of Lieutenant-General Richard Onslow
6. Plumer Hamilton, died young
7. William (1721–1744), lost in HMS Victory off Alderney.
8. A daughter (born 1736), died an infant

== Scientific studies ==
On 10 November 1715 Lord Paisley was elected a Fellow of the Royal Society.

Lord Paisley was a Freemason and was Grand Master of the Premier Grand Lodge of England during 1725–1726.

In 1729 he published a short treatise entitled Calculations and Tables Relating to the Attractive Virtue of Loadstones (according to the catalogue of the British Library), which presents the results of experiments he had made with lodestones (natural permanent magnets) of various sizes, each time measuring the mass of the loadstone and the weight of iron with which it can be armed, or that it can hold on its surfaces.

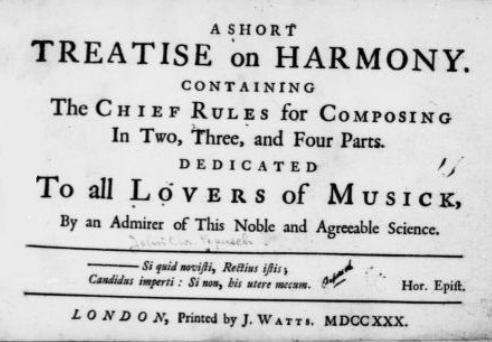
Frontispiece of the 1730 edition

Lord Paisley also studied music, taking lessons from Johann Christoph Pepusch, a well-known musician in his time. In 1730 he published, based on Pepusch's teaching, anonymously and without his teacher's assent a booklet entitled "A Short Treatise on Harmony". Understandably, the teacher felt offended. As the book was not well written and lacked illustrations in musical notes, he was concerned about his reputation as his connection to the book would certainly be discovered. He, therefore, helped to prepare a second improved edition published in 1731. In this form the book exposed and documented the practice of the best composers of the period. Paisley was still in friendly connection with his teachers as Pepusch visited Paisley at his seat in Witham, Essex in 1733.

== Father's succession ==
Lord Paisley succeeded as the 7th Earl of Abercorn at his father's death in 1734. In Ireland, he succeeded as the 2nd Viscount Strabane.

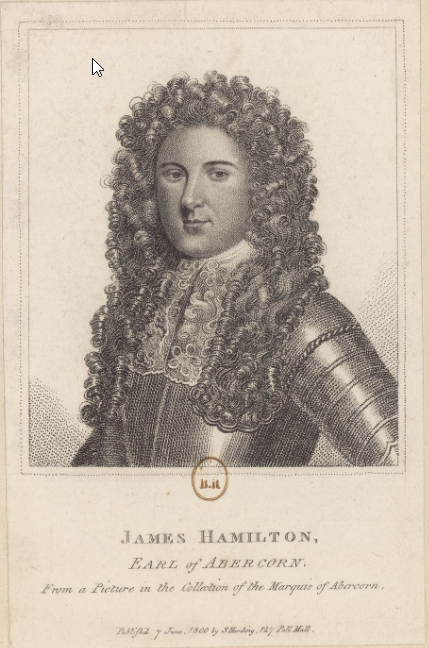
James Hamilton, Earl of Abercorn

Lord Abercorn was sworn a Privy Counsellor in Great Britain on 20 July 1738. He was appointed to the Privy Counsellor in Ireland in July 1737 but was sworn only on 26 September 1739 when he came to Ireland.

On 17 October of that same year, George II issued a royal charter to the nation's first orphanage for abandoned children, the Foundling Hospital, of which Abercorn was one of the many founding governors.

== Death and timeline ==
Abercorn died on 11 January 1744 at Cavendish Square, western London, and was buried five days later in the Ormonde vault of the Henry VII Chapel of Westminster Abbey where his father had already been laid to rest.

Timeline
Age	Date	Event
0	1686, 22 Mar	Born
2	1689, 13 Feb	Accession of William and Mary, succeeding King James II
2	1689, 21 Mar	Father brought provisions to Derry during the Williamite War in Ireland.
15	1701, Jun	Became heir apparent as Lord Paisley as his father succeeded as the 6th Earl of Abercorn.
15	1702, 8 Mar	Accession of Queen Anne, succeeding King William III
25	1711, Apr	Married Anne Plumer.
28	1714, 1 Aug	Accession of King George I, succeeding Queen Anne
29	1715, 10 Nov	Elected a Fellow of the Royal Society.
41	1727, 11 Jun	Accession of King George II, succeeding King George I
42–43	1729	Published Calculations and Tables on the Attractive Power of Loadstones
47–48	1734, 28 Nov	Succeeded his father as 7th Earl of Abercorn.
52	1738, 20 Jul	Sworn of the Privy council of Great Britain
53	1739, 26 Sep	Sworn of the Privy council of Ireland
57	1744, 11 Jan	Died at Cavendish Square in London

== Notes and references ==
=== Sources ===
- Chester, Joseph Lemuel (1876). Registers of Westminster Abbey. London: Private Edition. OCLC 1140248. – Marriages, baptisms and burials from about 1660 to 1875
- Cokayne, George Edward (1904). Complete Baronetage, 1611 to 1800. Vol. IV (1st ed.). Exeter: William Pollard & Co. OCLC 866278985. – 1665 to 1707
- Cokayne, George Edward (1910). Gibbs, Vicary (ed.). The complete peerage of England, Scotland, Ireland, Great Britain and the United Kingdom, extant, extinct, or dormant. Vol. I (2nd ed.). London: St Catherine Press. OCLC 228661424. – Ab-Adam to Basing
- Fryde, Edmund Boleslaw; Greenway, D. E.; Porter, S.; Roy, I., eds. (1986). Handbook of British Chronology. Royal Historical Society Guides and Handbooks, No. 2 (3rd ed.). London: Offices of the Royal Historical Society. ISBN 0-86193-106-8. – (for timeline)
- Hawkins, John (1875) [1st pub. 1776]. A General History of the Science and Practice of Music. Vol. II (A new ed.). London: Novello, Ewer & Co.
- Massie, Joseph (1739). Farther Observations Concerning the Foundling-Hospital. London: J. Osborn. OCLC 508010235.
- Paul, Sir James Balfour (1904). The Scots Peerage, Founded on Wood's Edition of Sir Robert Douglas's Peerage of Scotland. Vol. I. Edinburgh: David Douglas. OCLC 505064285. – Abercorn to Balmerino
- Lodge, John (1789). Archdall, Mervyn (ed.). The Peerage of Ireland or, A Genealogical History of the Present Nobility of that Kingdom. Vol. V. Dublin: James Moore. OCLC 264906028. – Viscounts (for Strabane)
- Novello, Joseph Alfred, ed. (1840). "Musical Biography-No. XI Dr. Christopher Pepusch". The Musical World: A Weekly Record of Musical Science, Literature, and Intelligence. XIV: 230–231.
- Walters, John (1972). The Royal Griffin: Frederick Prince of Wales 1707–51. London: Jarrolds. ISBN 0-09-111240-0.
- Wills, Rev. James (1841). "Sir James Hamilton First Viscount Strabane". Lives of Illustrious and Distinguished Irishmen, from the earliest times to the present period. Vol. IV. Dublin: MacGregor, Polson & Co. pp. 55–56.

Masonic offices
Preceded by The Duke of Richmond and Lennox	Grand Master of the Premier; Grand Lodge of England; 1725–1726	Succeeded by The Earl of Inchiquin
Peerage of Scotland
Preceded by James Hamilton	Earl of Abercorn; 1734–1744	Succeeded by James Hamilton
Peerage of Ireland
Preceded by James Hamilton	Viscount Strabane; 1734–1744	Succeeded by James Hamilton
Preceded by James Hamilton	Baron Mountcastle (descended by acceleration); 1734–1736	Succeeded by James Hamilton
