= Baron Hamilton of Strabane =

Lord Hamilton, Baron of Strabane, in the County of Tyrone, is a title in the Peerage of Ireland created on 8 May 1617, for James Hamilton, Master of Abercorn, eldest son of James Hamilton, 1st Earl of Abercorn, during the life of his father (and his grandfather, Claud Hamilton, 1st Lord Paisley); the barony had the special remainder to the heir-males of his father. He was about thirteen at the time. Both Abercorn and Paisley were in the peerage of Scotland. He inherited his father's several titles in 1618, his grandfather's title in 1621.

In 1633, shortly after his marriage, he gave his Irish lands to his younger brother, Claud, and resigned his title to the King, to be given to Claud; it was recreated on 14 August 1634 (with the precedence of 1617).

George Hamilton, 3rd Earl of Abercorn, the second Earl's last surviving son, died in Padua, sometime around 1680 or 1682. Claud Hamilton, 5th Lord Hamilton, grandson of the 2nd Baron, therefore inherited the Earldom of Abercorn; the Lords Hamilton have since been Earls, Marquesses, and Dukes of Abercorn, with one exception:

The same Claud Hamilton, 5th Baron and 4th Earl, was Lord of the Bedchamber to James II, went with him into exile, and fought on the losing side at the Battle of the Boyne. Thereafter he was outlawed, attainted and deprived of his Irish peerage and estates; but not the Scottish ones. However, he died in a naval encounter on his way back to France a few months later, in August 1691, and his brother and heir Charles Hamilton, 5th Earl of Abercorn was able to get the attainder reversed, on 24 May 1692.

James Hamilton, 6th Earl of Abercorn was descended from another son of the first Earl, but inherited the Barony of Strabane in 1701 without regrant, under the special remainder. He, who had joined William of Orange in 1688, and fought to defend Derry during the Siege of Derry, promptly had his Irish title promoted to Viscount Strabane.

James Hamilton, second Marquess of Abercorn was Lord Lieutenant of Ireland in 1868, when he was created Duke of Abercorn, and Marquess of Hamilton of Strabane; both again in the Peerage of Ireland. Officially, these were not creations but promotions of his existing Irish titles; this matters because the Act of Union 1800 limited the number of Irish creations after the Union. There is some dispute over the propriety of this action.

== Lords Hamilton, Barons of Strabane (1617 to date) ==
- James Hamilton, 2nd Earl of Abercorn and 1st Baron Hamilton of Strabane (c. 1614 – c. 1670) (resigned 1633)
- Claud Hamilton, 2nd Baron Hamilton of Strabane (died 1638) br. of prec.
- James Hamilton, 3rd Baron Hamilton of Strabane (1633–1655)
- George Hamilton, 4th Baron Hamilton of Strabane (died 1668) br. of prec.
- Claud Hamilton, 4th Earl of Abercorn and 5th Baron Hamilton of Strabane (1658–1691) (attainted 1691)
- Charles Hamilton, 5th Earl of Abercorn and 6th Baron Hamilton of Strabane (died 1701) br. of prec. (attainder reversed 1692).

For further Barons, see Duke of Abercorn.

== Family tree ==
Douglas-Hamilton family trees: Dukes of: Abercorn, Brandon, and Hamilton with subsidiary and courtesy titles

James II; 1430–1460; King of Scotland
Earl of Arran (Scotland) (1st creation), 1467 | Lord Hamilton, 1445
Thomas Boyd d. c. 1473; Earl of Arran | Mary Stewart; 1453–1488 dowager Countess of Arran | James Hamilton c. 1415–1479; 1st Lord Hamilton | James III; 1451–1488; King of Scotland
Earldom of Arran (1st creation) forfeit, 1469
Earl of Arran (Scotland) (2nd creation), 1503
James Hamilton c. 1475–1529; 2nd Lord Hamilton, 1st Earl of Arran | James IV; 1473–1513; King of Scotland
Catherine Stewart (illegit.) c. 1495–1554 | James Douglas d. 1548; Earl of Morton
Duke of Châtellerault (France) (5th creation), 1548
James Hamilton c. 1516–1575; 2nd Earl of Arran, 3rd Lord Hamilton, 1st Duke of Châtellerault | Margaret Douglas c. 1510–1579
Dukedom of Châtellerault (5th creation) forfeit, 1559
Marquess of Hamilton, Earl of Arran, and Lord Aven, 1599 | Lord Paisley, 1587
James Hamilton c. 1533–1609; 3rd Earl of Arran, 4th Lord Hamilton | Anne Hamilton c. 1535 – c. 1574 m. George Gordon Earl of Huntly | John Hamilton; 1540–1604; 1st Marquess of Hamilton, etc. | Claud Hamilton; 1546–1621; Lord Paisley
Earl of Cambridge (England) (4th creation) and Baron of Innerdale, 1619 | Lord Abercorn, 1603; Earl of Abercorn, Lord of Paisley, Hamilton, Mountcastell and Kilpatrick, 1606
George Gordon; 1562–1636; Marquess of Huntly | James Hamilton; 1589–1625; 2nd Marquess of Hamilton, etc., 4th Earl of Arran, 1st Earl of Cambridge, etc. 5th Lord Hamilton, Lord Aberbrothwick/Arbroath | James Hamilton; 1575–1618; 1st Earl of Abercorn, Lord Abercorn and Lord of Paisley, Hamilton, Mountcastell and Kilpatrick
Earldom of Angus (1389 creation) resigned in favor of: Marquess of Douglas, Earl of Angus, Lord Abernethy, Lord Bonkyll and Preston, Lord Abernethy, and Lord Jedburgh Forest, 1633 | Duke of Hamilton, Marquess of Clydesdale, Earl of Arran and Cambridge (Scotland) and Baron of Aven and Innerdale, 1643 | Earl of Lanark, 1639 | Baron Hamilton of Strabane, 1617
William Douglas; 1589–1660; 1st Marquess of Douglas, etc. 11th Earl of Angus (1389 creation) | Mary Gordon c. 1600–1674 | James Hamilton; 1606–1649; 1st Duke of Hamilton, etc., 3rd Marquess of Hamilton, etc., 5th Earl of Arran, 2nd Earl of Cambridge, etc. | William Hamilton; 1616–1651; 2nd Duke of Hamilton, etc., 1st Earl of Lanark, 6th Earl of Arran, 3rd Earl of Cambridge, etc. | James Hamilton c. 1604 – c. 1670; 2nd Earl of Abercorn, etc., 2nd Lord Paisley, 1st Lord Hamilton of Strabane | Claud Hamilton c. 1606–1638; 2nd Lord Hamilton of Strabane | George Hamilton c. 1607–1679
Earldom of Cambridge (4th creation) and Barony of Innerdale extinct and Earldom of Arran (2nd creation) dormant, 1651
Earl of Selkirk and Lord Daer and Shortcleuch, 1646
see Earl of Ormond family tree for Marquesses of Douglas, Earls of Angus, etc. | William Douglas-Hamilton; 1634–1694 jure uxoris Duke of Hamilton, etc. suo jure, 1st Earl of Selkirk, etc. | Anne Hamilton; 1631–1716 suo jure 3rd Duchess of Hamilton, etc., 2nd Countess of Lanark | George Hamilton c. 1636 – c. 1680; 3rd Earl of Abercorn, etc. | James Hamilton c. 1633 – c. 1670; Lord Paisley | James Hamilton; 1633–1655; 3rd Lord Hamilton of Strabane | George Hamilton c. 1636–1668; 4th Lord Hamilton of Strabane | James Hamilton c. 1620–1673
Ceded Dukedom of Hamilton to 4th Duke, 1698
Duke of Brandon and Baron Dutton, 1711 | Earl of Ruglen, 1697 | Earl of Orkney (3rd creation), 1697 | Viscount Strabane and Baron Mountcastle, 1701
James Hamilton; 1658–1712; 4th Duke of Hamilton, etc., 1st Duke of Brandon, etc. 3rd Earl of Lanark, etc. | Charles Douglas; 1663–1739; 2nd Earl of Selkirk, etc. | John Douglas-Hamilton; 1664–1744; 3rd Earl of Selkirk, etc., 1st Earl of Ruglen | George Hamilton; 1666–1737; 1st Earl of Orkney | Basil Hamilton; 1671–1701 | Catherine Hamilton | Charles Hamilton d. 1701; 5th Earl of Abercorn, etc., 6th Lord Hamilton of Strabane | Claud Hamilton; 1658–1691; 4th Earl of Abercorn, etc., 5th Lord Hamilton of Strabane | James Hamilton c. 1661–1734; 6th Earl of Abercorn, etc., 7th Lord Hamilton of Strabane
see Earls of Ruglen | see Earls of Orkney | Basil Hamilton; 1696–1742 | James Hamilton; 1685–1744; 7th Earl of Abercorn, etc., 8th Lord Hamilton of Strabane
Viscount Hamilton, 1786
James Hamilton; 1703–1743; 5th Duke of Hamilton, etc., 2nd Duke of Brandon, etc. 4th Earl of Lanark, etc. | Lord Anne Hamilton; 1709–1748 | Dunbar Douglas; 1722–1799; 4th Earl of Selkirk, etc. | James Hamilton; 1712–1789; 8th Earl of Abercorn, etc., 9th Lord Hamilton of Strabane, 1st Viscount Hamilton | John Hamilton; 1714–1755
Baron Hamilton of Hameldon county, Leicester, 1776 | Marquess of Abercorn, 1790
James Hamilton; 1724–1758; 6th Duke of Hamilton, etc., 3rd Duke of Brandon, etc., 5th Earl of Lanark, etc. | Elizabeth Gunning (c. 1733–1790) suo jure 1st Baroness Hamilton | Archibald Hamilton; 1740–1819; 9th Duke of Hamilton, etc., 6th Duke of Brandon, 8th Earl of Lanark, etc. | Charles Powell Hamilton; 1747–1825 | John Hamilton; 1756–1818; 1st Marquess of Abercorn, 9th Earl of Abercorn, etc., 10th Lord Hamilton of Strabane
James Hamilton; 1755–1769; 7th Duke of Hamilton, etc., 4th Duke of Brandon and Baron Dutton, Marquess of Angus and Abernethy, 4th Marquess of Douglas, etc., 6th Earl of Lanark, etc. | Douglas Hamilton; 1756–1799; 8th Duke of Hamilton, etc., 5th Duke of Brandon, Marquess of Douglas, etc.<>br/>7th Earl of Lanark, etc., 2nd Baron Hamilton | Alexander Hamilton; 1767–1852; 10th Duke of Hamilton, etc., 7th Duke of Brandon, Marquess of Douglas, and Baron Dutton, Earl of Angus, and Lord Abernethy and Jedburgh Forest, 9th Earl of Lanark, etc. | Augustus Barrington Price Anne Powell Douglas-Hamilton; 1781–1849 | Thomas Douglas; 1771–1820; 5th Earl of Selkirk, etc. | James Hamilton; 1786–1818 styled Viscount Hamilton
Duke of Abercorn, of Strabane and Duke of Abercorn, 1868
William Alexander Anthony Archibald Hamilton; 1811–1863; 11th Duke of Hamilton, etc., 8th Duke of Brandon, Marquess of Douglas, Earl of Angus, Lord Abernethy and Jedburgh Forest, and Baron Dutton, 10th Earl of Lanark, etc. | Charles Douglas-Hamilton; 1808–1873 | Dunbar James Douglas; 1809–1885; 6th Earl of Selkirk, etc. | James Hamilton; 1811–1885; 1st Duke of Abercorn, 2nd Marquess of Abercorn, 10th Earl of Abercorn, etc., 2nd Viscount Hamilton, 11th Lord Hamilton of Strabane
Duke of Châtellerault (France) (5th creation), revived 1548
William Alexander Louis Stephen Douglas-Hamilton; 1845–1895; 12th Duke of Hamilton, etc., 9th Duke of Brandon, Marquess of Douglas, Earl of Angus, Lord Abernethy and Jedburgh Forest and Baron Dutton, 2nd Duke of Châtellerault, 8th Earl of Selkirk, etc., 11th Earl of Lanark, etc. | Charles George Douglas-Hamilton; 1847–1886; 7th Earl of Selkirk, etc. | James Hamilton; 1838–1913; 2nd Duke of Abercorn, 3rd Marquess of Abercorn, 11th Earl of Abercorn, etc., 12th Lord Hamilton of Strabane
Alfred Douglas Douglas-Hamilton; 1862–1940; 13th Duke of Hamilton, etc., 10th Duke of Brandon, Marquess of Douglas, Earl of Angus (1633 creation), Lord Abernethy and Jedburgh Forest, and Baron Dutton, 20th Earl of Angus (1389 creation), 9th Earl of Selkirk, etc., 12th Earl of Lanark, etc. | James Albert Edward Hamilton; 1869–1953; 3rd Duke of Abercorn, 4th Marquess of Abercorn, 12th Earl of Abercorn, etc., 13th Lord Hamilton of Strabane
Douglas Douglas-Hamilton; 1903–1973; 14th Duke of Hamilton, etc., 11th Duke of Brandon, Marquess of Douglas, Earl of Angus (1633 creation), Lord Abernethy and Jedburgh Forest, and Baron Dutton, 21st Earl of Angus (1389 creation), 13rd Earl of Lanark, etc. | George Nigel Douglas-Hamilton; 1906–1994; 10th Earl of Selkirk, etc., 10th Lord Daer and Shortcleuch | Malcolm Douglas-Hamilton; 1909–1964 | James Edward Hamilton; 1904–1979; 4th Duke of Abercorn, 5th Marquess of Abercorn, 13th Earl of Abercorn, etc., 14th Lord Hamilton of Strabane
Baron Selkirk of Douglas, 1997
Angus Alan Douglas Douglas-Hamilton; 1938–2010; 15th Duke of Hamilton, etc., 12th Duke of Brandon, Marquess of Douglas, Earl of Angus (1633 creation), Lord Abernethy and Jedburgh Forest, and Baron Dutton, 22nd Earl of Angus (1389 creation), 14th Earl of Lanark, etc. | James Alexander Douglas-Hamilton; 1942–2023; 11th Earl of Selkirk, etc., Earldom disclaimed, 1994, Baron Selkirk of Douglas | Alasdair Douglas-Hamilton b. 1939 | James Hamilton b. 1934; 5th Duke of Abercorn, 6th Marquess of Abercorn, 14th Earl of Abercorn, etc., 15th Lord Hamilton of Strabane
Barony Selkirk of Douglas expired as a life peerage, 2023
Alexander Douglas-Hamilton b. 1978; 16th Duke of Hamilton, etc., 13th Duke of Brandon, Marquess of Douglas, Earl of Angus (1633 creation), Lord Abernethy and Jedburgh Forest, and Baron Dutton, 23rd Earl of Angus (1389 creation), 15th Earl of Lanark and Lord Machanshyre and Polmont | John William Douglas-Hamilton b. 1979 | John Andrew Douglas-Hamilton b. 1978; 12th Earl of Selkirk, etc. | Charles Douglas Douglas-Hamilton (b. 1979) | Angus Gavin Douglas-Hamilton b. 1968 | James Hamilton b. 1969 styled Marquess of Hamilton
Heir presumptive to the Earldom of Selkirk
Douglas Douglas-Hamilton b. 2012 styled Marquess of Douglas and Clydesdale | William Frederick Douglas-Hamilton b. 2014 | Basil George Douglas-Hamilton b. 2016 | William Douglas-Hamilton b. 1999 | James Hamilton b. 2005 styled Viscount Strabane
Heir apparent to the dukedoms of Hamilton and Brandon
