= James Hamilton, Lord Paisley =

Heir apparent of a Scottish earl (died before 1670)

James Hamilton
- Lord Paisley (courtesy title)
- Born: Early 1630s
- Died: Before 1670
- Spouse: Catherine Lenthall
- Issue Detail: Catherine
- Father: James Hamilton
- Mother: Katherine Clifton

James Hamilton, Lord Paisley (died before 1670) was the eldest son of James Hamilton, 2nd Earl of Abercorn and Katherine Clifton, 2nd Baroness Clifton. Born a Catholic he became a Presbyterian before 1646. He predeceased his father and is therefore an example of an heir apparent who never succeeded.

== Birth and origins ==
James was born in the early 1630s, (Note: His birth date is constrained by his parents' marriage, which happened in 1632 or not much before and his mother's death in September 1637 minus the gestations of his two younger brothers. The year 1633 is thought most likely.) probably in Paisley, Scotland, the eldest son of James Hamilton and his wife Katherine Clifton. His father was the 2nd Earl of Abercorn. His mother was Dowager Duchess of Lennox from her previous marriage and Baroness Clifton of Leighton Bromswold, England, in her own right. His parents had married in 1632 or not much before as she on 28 November 1632 obtained permission from the king to keep her precedence as a dowager duchess despite now marrying an earl. He had two brothers, who are listed in his father's article.

Family tree

James Hamilton with wife, parents, and other selected relatives. (Note: This family tree is partly derived from the Abercorn pedigree pictured in Cokayne. Also see the lists of siblings and children in the text.)

James; 1st Earl; Abercorn; 1575–1618	Marion; Boyd d. 1632; Recusant
James; 2nd Earl; Abercorn c. 1604 – c. 1670	Katherine; 2nd Baroness; Clifton c. 1590 – 1637	Claud; 2nd Baron; H. of Strabane c. 1606 – 1638	George; 1st Bt. Donalong c. 1607 – 1679
James; Ld Paisley c. 1635 – bef. 1670	Catherine; Lenthall	George; 3rd Earl; Abercorn c. 1636 – bef. 1683	James; 3rd Baron; H. of Strabane; 1633–1655	George; 4th Baron; H. of Strabane; 1636/7 – 1668
William; Lenthall d. 1686	Catherine c. 1653 – 1723	Claud; 4th Earl; Abercorn; 1659–1691	Charles; 5th Earl; Abercorn d. 1701
Elizabeth d. 1699

Legend

XXX	Subject of the article	XXX	Earls of Abercorn

Both his parents were Catholics and therefore recusants in Scotland. His mother died in Scotland while he was still an infant. As she was a Catholic, the Church of Scotland refused her a burial ceremony. As heir apparent of the Earl of Abercorn, James was styled Lord Paisley, which was at that time the courtesy title for the heir apparent in the family according to the Scottish manner. The rank of this title is a Lord of Parliament and is equivalent to an English or Irish baron. By 1646 Lord Paisley had become a good Presbyterian as is asserted in the proceedings of the General Assembly of the kirk of that year.

== Marriage and children ==
On 28 April 1653, at St Bartholomew-the-Less in London, Lord Paisley married Catherine Lenthall, niece of William Lenthall, speaker of the Long Parliament. His wife was a Protestant, the church where they married was Anglican.

James and Catherine had one daughter:

- Catherine Hamilton (1653–1723), who married first William Lenthall of Burford, grandson of the Speaker (died 1686), and secondly her second cousin (see family tree) Charles Hamilton, 5th Earl of Abercorn.

Their daughter married Charles Hamilton, a second cousin (see Family tree), who had also become a Protestant.

== Restoration ==
At the Restoration Lord Paisley tried to obtain some preferment through the intermediate of his uncle Sir George Hamilton, 1st Baronet (see Family tree), who was now well connected at the court as he had been in exile with the King. This is shown in a letter preserved in the Bodleian Library.

== Death, succession, and timeline ==
Lord Paisley died before his father and had no son. The next brother, William, also predeceased his father, so that the youngest brother, George, succeeded as heir apparent and inherited the corresponding courtesy title. George succeeded as the 3rd Earl of Abercorn at the father's death in 1670.

Timeline
As his birth date is uncertain, so are all his ages.
Age	Date	Event
0	1633, estimate	Born.
3–4	1637, Sep	Mother died in Scotland.
19–20	1653, 28 Apr	Married Catherine Lenthall in London.
26–27	1660	Asked his uncle Sir George Hamilton to obtain a royal favour for him.
31–32	Before 1670	Died predeceasing his father

== Notes and references ==
=== Sources ===
- Cokayne, George Edward (1910). Gibbs, Vicary (ed.). The complete peerage of England, Scotland, Ireland, Great Britain and the United Kingdom, extant, extinct, or dormant. Vol. I (2nd ed.). London: St Catherine Press. OCLC 228661424. – Ab-Adam to Basing (for Abercorn)
- Cokayne, George Edward (1913). Gibbs, Vicary (ed.). The complete peerage of England, Scotland, Ireland, Great Britain and the United Kingdom, extant, extinct, or dormant. Vol. III (2nd ed.). London: St Catherine Press. OCLC 228661424. – Canonteign to Cutts (for Clifton)
- Metcalfe, William Musham (1909). A History of Paisley. Paisley: Alexander Gardner. OCLC 1046586600.
- Paul, Sir James Balfour (1904). The Scots Peerage, Founded on Wood's Edition of Sir Robert Douglas's Peerage of Scotland. Vol. I. Edinburgh: David Douglas. OCLC 505064285. – Abercorn to Balmerino (for Abercorn)
