= James Hamilton, 6th Earl of Abercorn =

Scottish earl and Irish viscount (died 1734)

James Hamilton
- Earl of Abercorn
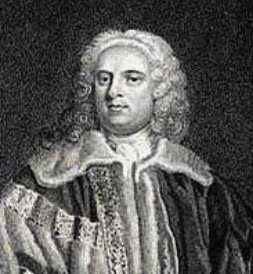
- Tenure: 1701–1734
- Predecessor: Charles, 5th Earl of Abercorn
- Successor: James, 7th Earl of Abercorn
- Born: c. 1661
- Died: 28 November 1734
- Buried: Westminster Abbey
- Spouse: Elizabeth Reading
- Issue Detail: James, George, Jane, Charles, & others
- Father: James Hamilton
- Mother: Elizabeth Colepeper

James Hamilton, 6th Earl of Abercorn, PC (Ire) (c. 1661 – 28 November 1734), was a Scottish and Irish peer and politician. Appointed a groom of the bedchamber to Charles II after his father's death in battle, he took the Williamite side at the Glorious Revolution and in March 1689 supplied Derry with stores that enabled the town to sustain the Siege of Derry until it was relieved in August. Shortly after inheriting a Scottish and Irish peerage from a second cousin, he was created a viscount in Ireland for his services to the Williamite cause.

== Birth and origins ==
James was born in 1661 or 1662, (Note: His year of birth, given by Henderson (1890) as 1656, is corrected to "about 1661" in Handley (2004).) the eldest son of James Hamilton and his wife Elizabeth Colepeper. His father, James the elder, was a colonel in the English army, Hyde Park Ranger, and a groom of the bedchamber to Charles II of England. His father's family was a cadet branch of the Abercorns that started with his grandfather Sir George Hamilton, 1st Baronet, of Donalong, who was the fourth son of the 1st Earl of Abercorn.

Family tree

James Hamilton with wife, parents, and other selected relatives. (Note: This family tree is partly derived from the Abercorn pedigree pictured in Cokayne. Also see the lists of siblings and children in the text.)

James; 1st Earl; 1575–1618	Marion; Boyd d. 1632; Recusant
James; 2nd Earl d. c. 1670	Claud; 2nd Baron; Strabane d. 1638	George; 1st Baronet. Donalong c. 1608 – 1679	Mary; Butler d. 1680
George; 3rd Earl c. 1636 – bef. 1683	James; 3rd Baron; Strabane; 1633–1655	George; 4th Baron; Strabane; 1636/7 – 1668	James d. 1673 d.v.p.*	Elizabeth; Colepeper d. 1709
Claud; 4th Earl; 1659–1691	Charles; 5th Earl d. 1701	James; 6th Earl c. 1661 – 1734	Elizabeth; Reading d. 1754
James; 7th Earl; 1686–1744	Anne; Plumer; 1690–1776
James; 8th Earl; 1712–1789	John; Hamilton; 1714–1755	Harriet; Eliot
John; 1st Marquess; 1756–1818	Catherine; Copley died 1791

Legend

XXX	Subject of the article	XXX	Earls of Abercorn	XXX	Barons; Strabane

*d.v.p. = predeceased his father (decessit vita patris)

James's mother was a daughter of John Colepeper, 1st Baron Colepeper, an English courtier. His parents married in 1661. James, the younger, was one of six sons, of which three survived into adulthood. and are listed in his father's article. James, the younger, was raised a Protestant as his father, who had originally been a Catholic, had converted to that faith to marry his mother.

== Father's and grandfather's successions ==
On 6 June 1673 when he was about twelve years old, his father died from a wound received at a sea fight with the Dutch in the Third Anglo-Dutch War. James, the younger, was compensated by an appointment as an extra groom of the bedchamber on 18 April 1680. His father had predeceased his grandfather who still held the land of Donalong between Strabane and Derry in Ireland.

When his grandfather died in 1679, James, the younger, inherited the land and should have succeeded to his grandfather's baronetcy, i.e. Baronet Hamilton of Donalong, but he never assumed the title calling himself Captain Hamilton, his rank in the English army. This might indicate that this baronetcy had never been properly created.

== Marriage and children ==
Captain Hamilton married the heiress Elizabeth Reading, daughter of Sir Robert Reading, 1st Baronet, of Dublin, and Jane Hannay, widow of Charles Coote, 1st Earl of Mountrath, in January 1684. Charles II issued a warrant on 22 January 1684 to create Hamilton "Baron Hamilton of Bellamont", county Dublin, in the Irish peerage, but it never passed the seals.

James and Elizabeth had 14 children nine sons:

1. Robert (1687), died as a young child
2. James (1686–1744), became the 7th Earl
3. Robert, died very young
4. John (c. 1694 – 1714), never married
5. George, died in infancy
6. George (died 1775), MP, married and had issue
7. Rev. Hon. Francis Hamilton (1700–1746), married and had issue
8. William (1703–1721), was lost aboard HMS Royal Anne Galley
9. Charles (1704–1786), MP, married and had issue

—and five daughters:

1. Elizabeth Hamilton, married firstly on 2 January 1711 William Brownlow, and secondly in 1741 Martin, Count de Kearnie Through her first marriage she is an ancestress of actor Ralph Fiennes.
2. Jane, died in infancy
3. Mary (born before 1704), married in January 1719 Henry Colley of Carbury Castle, County Kildare and had issue
4. Philippa Hamilton (died 1767), married Rev. Benjamin Pratt without issue, then married Michael O'Connell of London and had one son
5. Jane (before 1704 – 1753), married Archibald Douglas-Hamilton as his third wife She also was mistress to Frederick, Prince of Wales.

== Expedition to Derry ==
Captain Hamilton's post in the bedchamber ended with the King's death in 1685. He had entered a career in the army and held a commission in the English army of the new king, James II.

In 1688 at the Glorious Revolution he sided with William. In spring 1689 when war menaced in northern Ireland, he was sent to Derry with provisions in order to prepare the city for a likely siege. On 21 March 1689 he arrived at Derry from England with two ships: the frigate HMS Jersey and the merchantman Deliverance, bringing gunpowder, munition, weapons, and £595 in cash. These provisions were to be crucial during the Siege of Derry. He also brought the commission from King William and Queen Mary that confirmed Colonel Robert Lundy as Williamite governor of the town.

He therefore helped to defend Derry. His uncle Richard Hamilton (officer), lieutenant-general in the Irish Royal Army, attacked it.

== Member of parliament ==
After the end of the Williamite war in Ireland, he was elected as one of the two MPs for County Tyrone in the Irish House of Commons on 22 September 1692 and again on 12 August 1695.

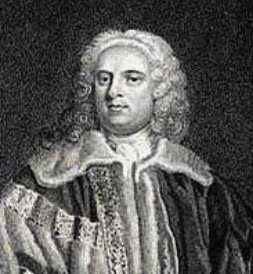
Hamilton in parliamentary robes

== Sixth Earl of Abercorn ==
In June 1701 died in Strabane his second cousin Charles Hamilton, 5th Earl of Abercorn, without surviving children. Captain Hamilton was his second cousin. The great-grandfather they had in common was James Hamilton, 1st Earl of Abercorn (see Family tree). Captain Hamilton succeeded as 6th Earl of Abercorn in the Scottish and 7th Baron Hamilton of Strabane in the Irish peerage. His eldest, James, acquired the courtesy title Lord Paisley as the heir apparent. The new Lord Abercorn also entered into the possession of the corresponding lands.

About six months later, on 2 December 1701, Lord Abercorn was rewarded by King William with the titles of Viscount Strabane and Baron Mountcastle, both in the Peerage of Ireland. The former was an enhancement of his title of Baron Hamilton of Strabane and was probably given to improve his precedence at the Irish House of Lords.

Lord Abercorn took his seat in the Irish House of Lords (as Viscount Strabane) on 21 September 1703, and in the Parliament of Scotland (as Earl of Abercorn) on 3 October 1706. By April 1711, he had been appointed also to the Privy Council of Ireland.

His father-in-law had built several lighthouses on Ireland's coast under a patent from Charles I. They had been made over to Hamilton as part of the dowry. In 1703 the Irish government found the lighthouses neglected and took them over. Hamilton was compensated by a payment of £3,000.

== Death, succession, and timeline ==
Abercorn died on 28 November 1734 at the age of 73 and was buried on 3 December in the Ormond vault of the Henry VII Chapel in Westminster Abbey. The Ormond Vault was opened in 1868 and was found to be filled with many coffins stacked one over the other. Their number was estimated at 59. Individual identification beyond the top layer was not attempted. Abercorn's remains may well be there.

He was succeeded by his eldest son James as the 7th Earl. His wife died on 19 March 1754.

Timeline
As his birth date is uncertain, so are all his ages.
Age	Date	Event
0	1661, about	Born
11–12	1673, 6 Jun	Father died from a wound received in a sea fight against the Dutch.
17–18	1679	Did not assume the title of Baronet Hamilton of Donalong and Nenagh at his grandfather's death.
21–22	1683, Jan	Married Elizabeth Reading.
23–24	1685	Lost his office as groom of the bedchamber at Charles II's death.
26–27	1688	Sided with William at the Glorious Revolution.
27–28	1689, 21 Mar	Brought provisions to Derry.
30–31	1692, 22 Sep	Elected MP for County Tyrone.
33–34	1695, 12 Aug	Re-elected MP for County Tyrone.
39–40	1701, Jun	Succeeded his second cousin Charles as 6th Earl of Abercorn.
39–40	1701, 2 Sep	Created Baron Mountcastle and Viscount Strabane.
47–48	1709	Mother died.
72–73	1734, 28 Nov	Died and was buried in the Henry VII Chapel at Westminster Abbey.

== Legacy ==
Abercorn Street in Savannah, Georgia, is named for the 6th Earl.

== Notes and references ==
=== Sources ===
- Bergin, John (October 2009). McGuire, James; Quinn, James (eds.). "Hamilton, James". Dictionary of Irish Biography.
- Burke, Bernard; Burke, Ashworth Peter (1915). A Genealogical and Heraldic History of the Peerage and Baronetage, the Privy Council, Knightage and Companionage (77th ed.). London: Harrison. OCLC 1155471554.
- Chester, Joseph Lemuel (1876). Registers of Westminster Abbey. London: Private Edition. OCLC 1140248. – Marriages, baptisms and burials from about 1660 to 1875
- Childs, John (2007). The Williamite Wars in Ireland 1688–1691. London: Hambledon Continuum Press. ISBN 978-1-85285-573-4. – (Preview)
- Cokayne, George Edward (1903). Complete Baronetage, 1611 to 1800. Vol. III (1st ed.). Exeter: William Pollard & Co. OCLC 866278985. – 1649 to 1664
- Cokayne, George Edward (1910). Gibbs, Vicary (ed.). The complete peerage of England, Scotland, Ireland, Great Britain and the United Kingdom, extant, extinct, or dormant. Vol. I (2nd ed.). London: St Catherine Press. OCLC 228661424. – Ab-Adam to Basing
- Cope, Tony (2016). It's Not That Lincoln. The Abercorn Press. ISBN 978-1-5352-4841-9.
- Handley, Stuart (2004). "Hamilton, James, sixth Earl of Abercorn (c. 1661–1734)". In Matthew, Colin; Harrison, Brian (eds.). Oxford Dictionary of National Biography. Vol. 24. New York: Oxford University Press. pp. 852–853. ISBN 0-19-861374-1.
- Henderson, Thomas Finlayson (1890). "Hamilton, James, sixth Earl of Abercorn (1656–1734)". In Lee, Sidney (ed.). Dictionary of National Biography. Vol. XXIV. New York: MacMillan and Co. p. 185. OCLC 8544105.
- House of Commons (1878). Return. Members of Parliament – Part II. Parliaments of Great Britain, 1705–1796. Parliaments of the United Kingdom, 1801–1874. Parliaments and Conventions of the Estates of Scotland, 1357–1707. Parliaments of Ireland, 1599–1800. London: His/Her Majesty's Stationery Office. OCLC 13112546.
- Lodge, John (1789). Archdall, Mervyn (ed.). The Peerage of Ireland or, A Genealogical History of the Present Nobility of that Kingdom. Vol. V. Dublin: James Moore. OCLC 264906028. – Viscounts
- MacGeoghegan, James (1763). Histoire de l'Irlande ancienne et moderne, tirée des Monuments les plus authentiques [History of Ancient and Modern Ireland] (in French). Vol. Tome troisième. Paris: Antoine Boudet. – 1558 to 1699
- Paul, Sir James Balfour (1904). The Scots Peerage, Founded on Wood's Edition of Sir Robert Douglas's Peerage of Scotland. Vol. I. Edinburgh: David Douglas. OCLC 505064285. – Abercorn to Balmerino
- Sainty, Sir John Christopher; Bucholz, Robert O. (1997). Officials of the Royal Household 1660 – 1683: Department of the Lord Chamberlain and Associated Offices. London: University of London, Institute of Historical Research. ISBN 978-1-87134-840-8. – (Snippet view)
- Stanley, Arthur Penrhyn (1869). Historical Memorials of Westminster Abbey (3rd and revised ed.). London: John Murray. – with the report of the examination of the Ormond Vault in 1868
- Walker, Rev. George (1893). Dwyer, Rev. Philip (ed.). The siege of Londonderry in 1689, as set forth in the Literary Remains of Colonel the Rev. George Walker, D.D. London: Robert Clavel & Ralph Simpson. OCLC 79434854.
- Walters, John (1972). The Royal Griffin: Frederick Prince of Wales 1707–51. London: Jarrolds. ISBN 0-09-111240-0.
- Wills, Rev. James (1841). "Sir James Hamilton First Viscount Strabane". Lives of Illustrious and Distinguished Irishmen, from the earliest times to the present period. Vol. IV. Dublin: MacGregor, Polson & Co. pp. 55–56.
- Witherow, Thomas (1879). Derry and Enniskillen in the Year 1689. London & Belfast: William Mallan & Son. OCLC 82779901.

Parliament of Ireland
Preceded by Gordon O'Neill; Lewis Doe	Member of Parliament for County Tyrone; 1692–1699; With: Henry Mervyn	Succeeded by Richard Stewart; Audley Mervyn
Peerage of Scotland
Preceded by Charles Hamilton	Earl of Abercorn; 1701–1734	Succeeded by James Hamilton
Peerage of Ireland
New creation	Viscount Strabane; 1701–1734	Succeeded by James Hamilton
