= Gervase Clifton, 1st Baron Clifton =

English politician and noble

Member of Parliament for Huntingdonshire
- In office 1597-1598; 1601

Personal details
- Born: c. 1570 England
- Died: 14 October 1618 (aged 47–48)
- Spouse: Katherine Darcy (m. 1591)
- Children: 2+, including Katherine
- Education: St Alban Hall
- Occupation: Politician

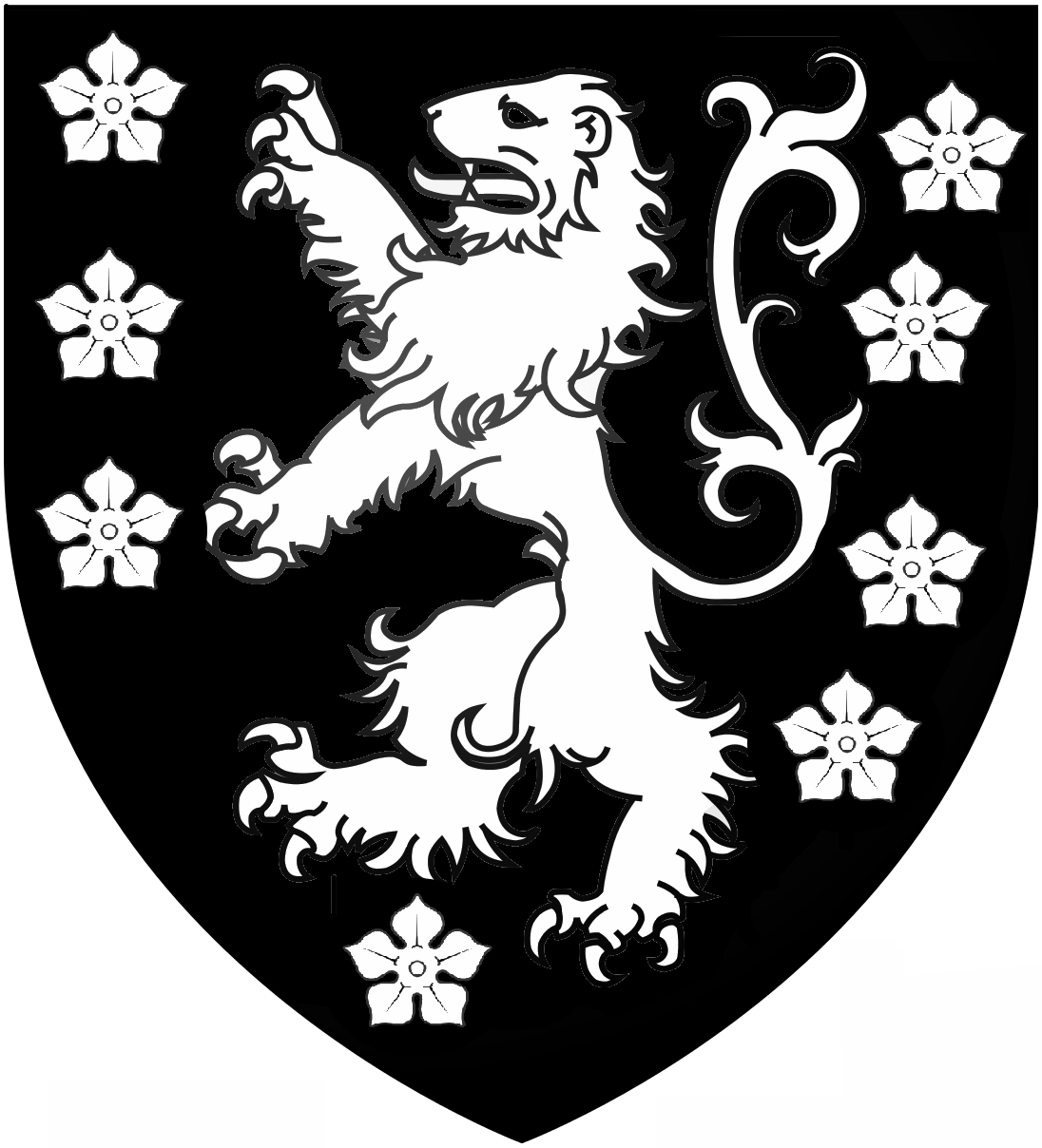
Arms of Clifton of Clifton, Nottinghamshire (Baron Clifton of Leighton Bromswold): Sable semée of cinquefoils and a lion rampant argent

Gervase Clifton, 1st Baron Clifton (c. 1570 – 14 October 1618) was an English nobleman.

== Origins ==
Clifton was a son of Sir John Clifton (d. 1593) of Barrington Court, Somerset, by his wife Anne Stanley, daughter of Thomas Stanley, 2nd Baron Monteagle (1507–1560). Sir John Clifton's father was a London merchant, Sir William Clifton (d. 1564), who had purchased the manor of Barrington from Henry Grey, 1st Duke of Suffolk.

Sir William Clifton was the son of Gervase Clifton of the Customs House, London, a younger son of Sir Gervase Clifton (d. 1508), KB (1494), of Clifton Hall, Nottingham, High Sheriff of Nottinghamshire, Derbyshire and the Royal Forests in 1502.

From Robert Clifton, the eldest son of Sir Gervase Clifton (d. 1508), were descended the Clifton baronets, which title was created in 1611.

== Career ==
He was educated at St Alban Hall, Oxford (1586), Gray's Inn (1588). In 1591, he became a Knight of the Shire of Huntingdonshire, settled in Leighton Bromswold and married Katherine, a daughter of Sir Henry Darcy (a previous Knight of the Shire) that year and was knighted by 1597. From 1597 to 1598, and also in 1601, Clifton was MP for Huntingdonshire.

In 1605, he sold his paternal estate of Barrington Court and moved his seat to Leighton Bromswold, County Huntingdon. In 1608, he was raised to the Peerage by writ of summons Baron Clifton, of Leighton Bromswold, County Huntingdon. This ancient form of creation by writ enabled the title to descend via female lines.

On 30 December 1617, Lord Clifton was imprisoned in the Tower of London for threatening Sir Francis Bacon when the latter ordered a survey of Clifton's land. He was then prosecuted by the Star Chamber on 17 March 1618 and moved to Fleet Prison, where he stabbed himself to death the following October. His only son had died in 1602 as a result of wounds received from a bear, which had broken free during a bear-baiting show at Nottingham, and so Clifton's title passed to his daughter, Katherine.

== Sources ==
- History of Parliament
- Tudor Place
- Burke's Peerage & Gentry, 107th edition

Peerage of England
| New creation | Baron Clifton; 1608–1618 | Succeeded by Katherine Stuart |
