= Charles Hamilton, 5th Earl of Abercorn =

Irish lord (died 1701)

Charles Hamilton
- Earl of Abercorn
- Tenure: 1691–1701
- Predecessor: Claud, 4th Earl
- Successor: James, 6th Earl
- Died: June 1701; Strabane
- Spouse: Catherine Lenthall
- Issue Detail: Elizabeth
- Father: George, 4th Baron H. of Strabane
- Mother: Elizabeth Fagan

Charles Hamilton, 5th Earl of Abercorn (died 1701) succeeded his brother who had been attainted as a Jacobite and, having conformed to the established religion, could get the attainder reversed.

Family tree

Charles Hamilton with wife, parents, and other selected relatives. He married a second cousin. (Note: This family tree is partly derived from the Abercorn pedigree pictured in Cokayne. Also see the list of children in the text.)

James; 1st Earl; Abercorn; 1575–1618	Marion; Boyd d. 1632; Recusant
James; 2nd Earl c. 1604 – c. 1670	Claud; 2nd Baron; H. of Strabane c. 1606 – 1638	Jean; Gordon
James; Lord Paisley c. 1635 – bef. 1670 d.v.p.*	George; 3rd Earl c. 1636 – bef. 1683	James; 3rd Baron; H. of Strabane; 1633–1655	George; 4th Baron; H. of Strabane; 1636/7 – 1668	Elizabeth; Fagan
William; Lenthall d. 1686	Catherine c. 1653 – 1723	Claud; 4th Earl; 1659–1691	Charles; 5th Earl d. 1701
Elizabeth d. 1699

Legend

XXX	Subject of the article	XXX	Earls of Abercorn	XXX	Baron Hamilton of Strabane

*d.v.p. = predeceased his father (decessit vita patris)

== Birth and origins ==
Charles was born between 1659 and 1668, (Note: He was born between 1659 (birth of his elder brother) and 1668 (his father's death).) probably at Kenure House in Rush, County Dublin. He was the second son of George Hamilton, and his wife Elizabeth Fagan. His father was the 4th Baron Hamilton of Strabane, an important landowner in County Tyrone. The Strabanes were a cadet branch of the Abercorns and like the latter of Scottish origin.

Charles's mother was Irish and a rich heiress, the only child of Christopher Fagan of Feltrim, County Dublin. Charles was one of four siblings, who are listed in his father's article.

His parents were both Catholic, but he later conformed to the established religion. The family's usual residence was Kenure House in Rush, County Dublin, where he and his siblings were probably born and where his father died.

== Brother's succession ==
Charles's father died on 14 April 1668 at Kenure House and his elder brother, Claud, succeeded as the 5th Baron of Strabane. Charles became heir presumptive as his brother was unmarried. In about 1680 Claud also succeeded as the 4th Earl of Abercorn after the death of his cousin George in faraway Padua, Italy.

However, in August 1691, when Charles was about 26, Claud was killed in a sea-fight when a Dutch privateer attacked the ship that should have brought him from Limerick to France. His brother had been a Jacobite and had been attainted in Ireland on 11 May 1691. Charles succeeded him immediately as the 5th Earl of Abercorn as the family's Scottish titles were not affected by the attainder but could not become Baron Hamilton of Strabane as that title was forfeit.

Abercorn, as he was now, had supported the Prince of Orange and was a Protestant, perhaps due to his marriage. On 24 May 1692, he obtained a reversal of his brother's attainder and also succeeded as Baron Hamilton of Strabane, becoming the 6th holder of that title. In that capacity he took his seat in the Irish House of Lords on 31 August 1695.

== Marriage and children ==
About 1690 Abercorn married Catherine Lenthall (née Hamilton), the widow of William Lenthall of Burford, a grandson of the speaker, and the daughter of James Hamilton, Lord Paisley. She was his second cousin, the common great-grandfather being James Hamilton, 1st Earl of Abercorn. Her father had converted to the Church of Scotland and she was a Protestant as her father and her first husband had been.

Charles and Catherine had an only child:

- Elizabeth, died young and was buried in St. Michan's Church, Dublin, on 22 February 1699

In 1697 Abercorn signed the Association, an oath of loyalty King William and Queen Mary that had been introduced in reaction to the Jacobite assassination plot of 1696.

On 3 April 1697 John Pryor was found murdered in the garden of Burford Priory. He had been a steward to William Lenthall, Abercorn's wife's first husband. Abercorn was accused of the murder and jailed but was finally acquitted.

== Death, succession, and timeline ==
Abercorn died childless in Strabane in June 1701. His only child, Elizabeth, had predeceased him in 1699. His widow died on 24 May 1723 in Pall Mall, London, and was buried in the Richmond vault of the Henry VII Chapel at Westminster Abbey.

With his death, the senior line of the Abercorns and the Strabanes failed. With regard to the Abercorns, the succession reverted to the next of the cadet branches descending from the five sons of the 1st Earl of Abercorn as it already had done in about 1650 when George, the 3rd Earl, died unmarried in Padua. As the 1st Earl's third son, William, 1st Baronet of Westport, had no children, the succession passed to the descendants of the fourth son, Sir George Hamilton, 1st Baronet, of Donalong. Our subject, the 5th Earl, was therefore succeeded as Earl of Abercorn by his second cousin, James Hamilton, the grandson of Sir George. James Hamilton would thus become the 6th Earl of Abercorn.

With regard to the Strabanes, Charles, our subject, was the 6th Baron, and the last heir-male of Claud Hamilton, the 2nd Baron, to whom the title had been regranted after the 2nd Earl had resigned it. The succession, therefore, needed to make use of the special remainder, which also allowed succession through heirs-male from the body of the grantee's father. Therefore, not only the Scottish but also the Irish title devolved to his second cousin, James Hamilton. James, therefore, became 6th Earl of Abercorn and 7th Baron Hamilton of Strabane. From that time on these two titles merged and would always be worn by the same person.

Timeline
As his birth date is uncertain, so are all his ages. Italics for historical background.
Age	Date	Event
0	Estimated 1665	Born, probably at Kenure House
2–3	14 Apr 1668	Became heir presumptive after his brother succeeded as 5th Baron Hamilton of Strabane
14–15	About 1680	Brother Claud succeeded as the 4th Earl of Abercorn.
19–20	6 Feb 1685	Accession of James II, succeeding Charles II
23–24	13 Feb 1689	Accession of William and Mary, succeeding James II
24–25	About 1690	Married his 2nd cousin Catherine Lenthall (née Hamilton) and became a Protestant
25–26	Aug 1691	Succeeded as 5th Earl of Abercorn as his brother is killed in a sea-fight.
26–27	24 May 1692	Obtained reversal of the attainder and also becomes Baron Hamilton of Strabane
29–30	31 Aug 1695	Took his seat in the Irish House of Lords.
31–32	3 Apr 1697	Accused of murdering John Pryor at Burford
31–32	16 Jul 1697	Tried for John Pryor's murder and acquitted
33–34	Feb 1699	Elizabeth, his only child, died.
35–36	Jun 1701	Died in Strabane

== Notes and references ==
=== Sources ===
- Chester, Joseph Lemuel (1876). Registers of Westminster Abbey. London: Private Edition. OCLC 1140248. – Marriages, baptisms and burials from about 1660 to 1875
- Cokayne, George Edward (1910). Gibbs, Vicary (ed.). The complete peerage of England, Scotland, Ireland, Great Britain and the United Kingdom, extant, extinct, or dormant. Vol. I (2nd ed.). London: The St Catherine Press. OCLC 1042385438. – Ab-Adam to Basing
- Cressy, David (1982). "Binding the nation: the Bonds of Association, 1584 and 1596". In Guth, DeLloyd J.; McKenna, John W. (eds.). Tudor Rule and Revolution: Essays for G R Elton from His American Friends. Cambridge: Cambridge University Press. pp. 217–234. ISBN 978-0-521-09127-5.
- Fryde, E. B.; Greenway, D. E.; Porter, S.; Roy, I., eds. (1986). Handbook of British Chronology. Royal Historical Society Guides and Handbooks, No. 2 (3rd ed.). London: Offices of the Royal Historical Society. ISBN 0-86193-106-8. – (for timeline)
- Handley, Stuart (2004). "Hamilton, James, sixth Earl of Abercorn (c. 1661–1734)". In Matthew, Colin; Harrison, Brian (eds.). Oxford Dictionary of National Biography. Vol. 24. New York: Oxford University Press. pp. 852–853. ISBN 0-19-861374-1.
- Lodge, John (1789). Archdall, Mervyn (ed.). The Peerage of Ireland or, A Genealogical History of the Present Nobility of that Kingdom. Vol. V. Dublin: James Moore. OCLC 264906028. – Viscounts
- London Gazette (13 August 1691). "Rye, August 8". London Gazette. No. 2687.
- Monk, William John (1891). History of Burford. Burford: C. W. Swatman. OCLC 12620499.
- Paul, Sir James Balfour (1904). The Scots Peerage, Founded on Wood's Edition of Sir Robert Douglas's Peerage of Scotland. Vol. I. Edinburgh: David Douglas. OCLC 505064285. – Abercorn to Balmerino

Peerage of Scotland
Preceded by Claud Hamilton	Earl of Abercorn; 1691–1701	Succeeded by James Hamilton
Peerage of Ireland
Forfeit Title last held by Claud Hamilton	Baron Hamilton of Strabane; 1692–1701	Succeeded by James Hamilton
