= Robert Reading =

Irish politician and lighthouse builder

Sir Robert Reading, first and last Baronet Reading, (c. 1640 – c. March 1689) built several privately owned lighthouses in Ireland under letters patent from Charles II of England.

He was educated at Christ Church, Oxford, receiving a BA in 1658.

He was elected as an MP in the Irish House of Commons for Ratoath (1662–1666), but was attainted by the Irish Parliament of James II (1689).

He married Jane Coote, daughter of Sir Robert Hannay c. 1662. She was the Dowager Countess of Mountrath as the widow of Charles Coote, 1st Earl of Mountrath. They had one child, Elizabeth (c. 1669–1754), who married James Hamilton, 6th Earl of Abercorn.

He was elected a Fellow of the Royal Society in November 1671. He was made 1st Baronet Reading of Dublin on 27 August 1675.

On his death, he was buried in Newark, Nottinghamshire.

== Lighthouses ==
The lighthouses built by Robert Reading were at Howth Head, the Howth bar, the Old Head of Kinsale, Charles Fort (formerly Barry Oge's castle), Hook Head and the Isle of Magee near Carlingford, County Louth. The Howth bar and Isle of Magee lights did not last long, though the latter was re-established on the Lesser Copeland Island. These lighthouses all had coal fires on their roofs.

In 1704 the lighthouses were compulsorily transferred into public ownership.

Baronetage of Ireland
| New creation | Baronet (of Dublin); 1675–1689 | Extinct |
