= Claud Hamilton, 4th Earl of Abercorn =

Irish Jacobite soldier (1659–1691)

Claud Hamilton,
- Earl of Abercorn
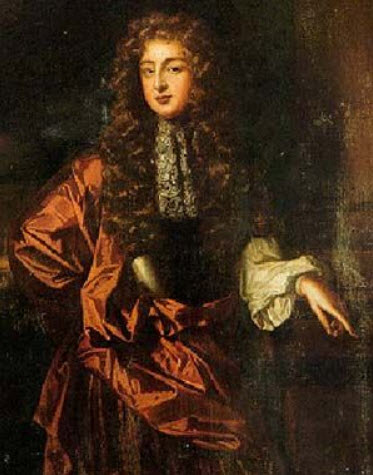
- Claud Hamilton, 4th Earl of Abercorn (Note: The identity of the sitter is dubious. The artist and the location are unknown.)
- Tenure: About 1680 – 1691
- Predecessor: George, 3rd Earl of Abercorn
- Successor: Charles, 5th Earl of Abercorn
- Born: 1659; Dublin
- Died: August 1691; At sea off Brest
- Spouse(s): Never married
- Father: George, 4th Baron Hamilton of Strabane
- Mother: Elizabeth Fagan

Claud Hamilton, 4th Earl of Abercorn PC (Ire) (1659–1691) was a Scottish and Irish peer who fought for the Jacobites in the Williamite War. He went with King James to Derry in 1689 and tried to negotiate the surrender of the town with Adam Murray. He raised a regiment of horse that he led in the defeats of Newtownbutler in 1689 and Aughrim in 1691. He was killed when the ship that should have brought him to France was intercepted by a Dutch privateer.

== Birth and origins ==
Claud was born in 1659, probably at Kenure House in Rush, County Dublin, baptised at St. Audoen's Church as the eldest son of George Hamilton, and Elizabeth Fagan. His father was the 4th Baron Hamilton of Strabane and an important landowner around Strabane, County Tyrone, Ulster, Ireland. The Strabanes were at that time a cadet branch of the Abercorns. Claud's mother was a rich heiress, the only child of Christopher Fagan of Feltrim, County Dublin.

He heads the list of siblings below as the eldest:

1. Claud (1659–1691)
2. Anne (died 1680), married John Browne
3. Charles (died 1701), succeeded him as the 5th Earl of Abercorn
4. Mary, married Garrett Dillon, Recorder of Dublin

His parents were both Catholic. The family's usual residence was Kenure House in Rush, County Dublin, where he and his siblings were probably born and where his father died.

== Father's succession ==
In 1668, at the age of nine, he succeeded his father as the 5th Baron Hamilton of Strabane. He was usually called Lord Strabane rather than Lord Hamilton as the latter title was also that of the earls of Hamilton in Scotland.

Family tree

Claud Hamilton with parents and other selected relatives. He never married. (Note: This family tree is partly derived from the Abercorn pedigree pictured in Cokayne. Also see the list of siblings in the text.)

James; 1st Earl; 1575–1618	Marion; Boyd d. 1632; Recusant
James; 2nd Earl d. 1670	Claud; 2nd Baron; H. of Strabane d. 1638	Jean; Gordon	George; 1st Bt. Donalong d. 1679
George; 3rd Earl c. 1636 – bef. 1683	James; 3rd Baron; H. of Strabane; 1633–1655	George; 4th Baron; H. of Strabane; 1636/7 – 1668	Elizabeth; Fagan	James c. 1630 – 1673
Claud; 4th Earl; 1659–1691	Charles; 5th Earl d. 1701	James; 6th Earl c. 1661 – 1734
James; 7th Earl; 1686–1744

Legend

XXX	Subject of the article	XXX	Earls of Abercorn

== Abercorn succession ==
Around 1680 his father's cousin (his second cousin once removed) George Hamilton, 3rd Earl of Abercorn, died in faraway Padua, Italy. With him failed the senior line of the Abercorns. The succession passed to the Strabane branch, the descendants of Claud Hamilton, 2nd Baron Hamilton of Strabane, the second son of the 1st Earl of Abercorn, of which Claud was the living representative. He, therefore, succeeded his cousin as the 4th Earl of Abercorn. This elevated him from baron to earl but did not make him much richer as the 2nd Earl had lost most of the Scottish Abercorn lands.

== With the Jacobites in Ireland ==
Lord Abercorn, as he was now, followed James II to France at the Glorious Revolution, and went with James to Ireland in 1689. When James arrived in Dublin and established his administration, Abercorn was appointed a member of the Jacobite Privy Council of Ireland and a Lord of the Bedchamber.

Abercorn went with the King up to Derry and was present on 18 April 1689 when James II asked the city to surrender. On 20 April 1689 the king sent him to the walls with a last proposal, which was however rejected by Adam Murray, who represented the city. (Note: The Earl of Abercorn also was the 5th Baron Hamilton of Strabane and owned much land around that town.) Upon this, the army began the Siege of Derry.

He raised a regiment of horse in Ireland for James, and led it in Lord Mountcashel's expedition against Enniskillen in July 1689. He was wounded in Mountcashel's defeat at Newtownbutler on 31 July. Abercorn was outlawed and attainted in Ireland by the Williamites on 11 May 1691, forfeiting his Irish peerage.

On 12 July 1691 he fought at the Battle of Aughrim under Saint Ruth against the Williamites under Ginkel. His regiment was part of the cavalry on the right wing of the Jacobites, which was commanded by de Tessé. The cavalry comprised the regiments Tyrconnel and Abercorn and probably also the regiment Prendergast. It may have been commanded by Sarsfield, but others say Sarsfield commanded a cavalry reserve behind the centre.

At that battle, the Williamites turned the left wing and then rolled up the Jacobite position from that side. The cavalry on the right was showered with fleeing foot soldiers from the left wing and the centre, and came late into action or fled without a fight.

== Death and succession ==
Richard Talbot, 1st Earl of Tyrconnel, sent him to France to carry news of the defeat to James, and ask for help. He boarded a ship for France at Limerick, but the ship was intercepted by a Dutch privateer and Abercorn was killed in the fight that ensued. (Note: Abercorn died in August 1691 after the Battle of Aughrim, but Anderson seems to ignore that he fought at Aughrim and gives the date as 1690.)

He was 32 years old and had never married. He was succeeded by his younger brother Charles, who had become a Protestant and had sided with William at the Glorious Revolution. His brother became the 5th Earl of Abercorn immediately as this title was in the peerage of Scotland and not affected by the Irish attainder. In 1692 the 5th Earl obtained the reversal of the attainder and thus became the 6th Baron Hamilton of Strabane and recovered the Irish estates.

Timeline
Age	Date	Event
0	1659, Sep	Born.
8	1668, 14 Apr	Succeeded his father as 5th Baron Hamilton of Strabane
20–21	1680, about	Succeeded as the 4th Earl of Abercorn.
25	1685, 6 Feb	Accession of King James II, succeeding King Charles II
29–30	1689, Apr	With King James II before Derry.
29–30	1689, 31 Jul	Wounded at the Battle of Newtownbutler.
31	1691, 11 May	Attainted and lost Irish titles and lands.
31	1691, 12 Jul	Fought at the Battle of Aughrim.
31	1691, Aug	Killed in a sea-fight with a Dutch privateer.

== Notes and references ==
=== Sources ===
==== Books ====
- Anderson, William (1877). The Scottish Nation; Surnames, Families, Literature, Honours, and Biographical History of the People of Scotland. Vol. I. Edinburgh: A. Fullarton & Co. OCLC 1084846646. – ABE to CUR (for Abercorn)
- Boulger, Demetrius Charles (1911). The Battle of the Boyne. London: Martin Secker. OCLC 1041056932.
- Burke, Bernard; Burke, Ashworth Peter (1915). A Genealogical and Heraldic History of the Peerage and Baronetage, the Privy Council, Knightage and Companionage (77th ed.). London: Harrison. OCLC 1155471554.
- Cokayne, George Edward (1910). Gibbs, Vicary (ed.). The complete peerage of England, Scotland, Ireland, Great Britain and the United Kingdom, extant, extinct, or dormant. Vol. I (2nd ed.). London: St Catherine Press. OCLC 228661424. – Ab-Adam to Basing
- D'Alton, John (1855). Illustrations, historical and genealogical, of King James's Irish army list, 1689. Dublin: Published by the author. OCLC 838655763.
- Fryde, Edmund Boleslaw; Greenway, D. E.; Porter, S.; Roy, I., eds. (1986). Handbook of British Chronology. Royal Historical Society Guides and Handbooks, No. 2 (3rd ed.). London: Offices of the Royal Historical Society. ISBN 0-86193-106-8. – (for timeline)
- Graham, Rev. John (1829). A History of the Siege of Londonderry and Defence of Enniskillen in 1688–9 (2nd ed.). Dublin: William Curry. OCLC 19596078.
- Graham, Rev. John (1841). Ireland Preserved; or the Siege of Londonderry and the Battle of Aughrim with Lyrical Poetry and Biographical Notes (2nd ed.). Dublin: Hardy and Walker. OCLC 00992682. – Short biographies in the biographical notes
- Handley, Stuart (2004). "Hamilton, James, sixth Earl of Abercorn (c. 1661–1734)". In Matthew, Colin; Harrison, Brian (eds.). Oxford Dictionary of National Biography. Vol. 24. New York: Oxford University Press. pp. 852–853. ISBN 0-19-861374-1.
- Hayes-McCoy, Gerard Anthony (1990) [1st pub. 1969]. Irish Battles: A Military History of Ireland. Belfast: The Appletree Press. ISBN 0-86281-250-X.
- Lodge, John (1789). Archdall, Mervyn (ed.). The Peerage of Ireland or, A Genealogical History of the Present Nobility of that Kingdom. Vol. V. Dublin: James Moore. OCLC 264906028. – Viscounts (for Strabane)
- Macpherson, James (1775). Original Papers; Containing the Secret History of Great Britain, from the Restoration to the Accession of the House of Hanover. To which are Prefixed Extracts from the Life of James II. Written by Himself. London: W Strahan and T Cadell. OCLC 1050258341.
- Metcalfe, William Musham (1909). A History of Paisley. Paisley: Alexander Gardner. OCLC 1046586600.
- Paul, Sir James Balfour (1904). The Scots Peerage, Founded on Wood's Edition of Sir Robert Douglas's Peerage of Scotland. Vol. I. Edinburgh: David Douglas. OCLC 505064285. – Abercorn to Balmerino (for Abercorn)
- Todhunter, John (1895). Life of Patrick Sarsfield, Earl of Lucan. London: T. Fisher Unwin. OCLC 6152671.
- Witherow, Thomas (1879). Derry and Enniskillen in the Year 1689. London & Belfast: William Mallan & Son. OCLC 82779901.

==== London Gazette ====
- "Rye, August 8". London Gazette. No. 2687. 8 August 1691.

Peerage of Ireland
Preceded by George Hamilton	Baron Hamilton of Strabane; 1668–1691	Succeeded by Attainted
Peerage of Scotland
Preceded by George Hamilton	Earl of Abercorn bef. 1683 – 1691	Succeeded by Charles Hamilton
