= Katherine Clifton, 2nd Baroness Clifton =

17th century English and Scottish earl

- Born: c. 1592; England
- Died: 1637 (aged 44–45); Scotland
- Spouse(s): Esmé Stewart (m. 1609; died 1624) James Hamilton (m. 1627)
- Children: 14, including James, George, Bernard, James and George
- Father: Gervase Clifton
- Relatives: Lord Esmé Stewart (father-in-law); Ludovic Stewart (brother-in-law); Marie Stewart, Countess of Mar (sister-in-law); Henry Howard (son-in-law); Archibald Douglas (son-in-law); Jerome Watson (son-in-law)

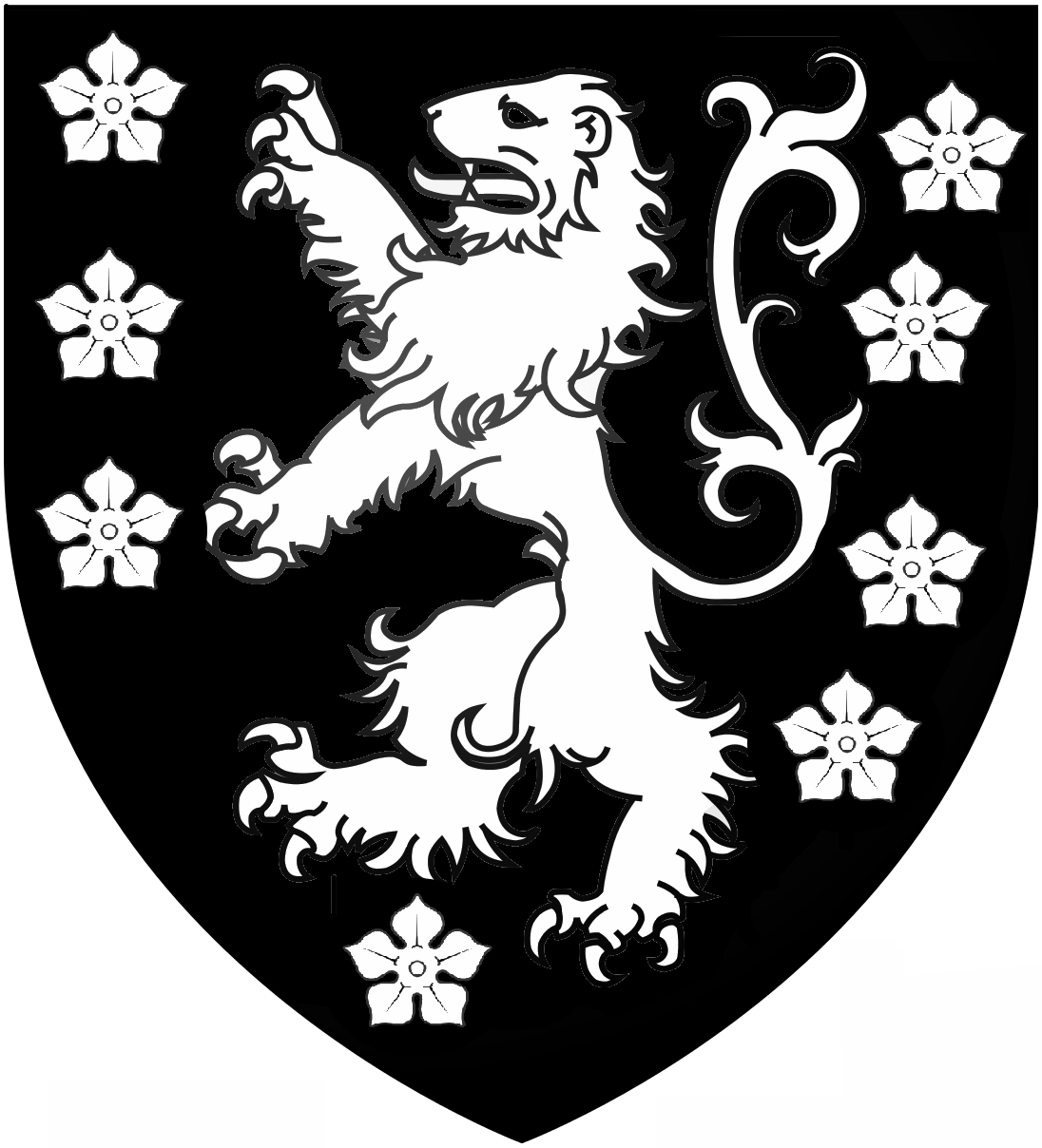
Arms of Clifton of Clifton, Nottinghamshire (Baron Clifton of Leighton Bromswold): Sable semée of cinquefoils and a lion rampant argent

Katherine Clifton, 2nd Baroness Clifton (c. 1592 – buried 17 September 1637), was an English-born Scottish peer (later known as the Countess of March, then Duchess of Lennox and then Countess of Abercorn).

== Birth and origins ==
Katherine was born about 1592, in England, a daughter of Gervase Clifton and his wife, Katherine Darcy. Her mother was the only child and heiress of Sir Henry Darcy. Her parents married in June 1591. Her brother died in 1602 and she became the only surviving child of her parents and heiress of the manor of Leighton Bromswold.

== Her father is made a baron by writ ==
On 9 July 1608 her father was summoned to Parliament by writ, which implicitly elevated him to a baron. Such baronies by writ had a succession in which a daughter could succeed in absence of a son.

== First marriage ==
Katherine Clifton married twice. In 1609, when she was about 17, she married her first husband, Lord Esmé Stewart, a younger son of Esmé Stewart, 1st Duke of Lennox in Scotland. In 1619, he was created Earl of March.

Catherine and Ésme had eleven children:

1. Elizabeth (1610–1674), who married Henry Howard, 22nd Earl of Arundel;
2. James (1612–1655), who became the 4th Duke of Lennox;
3. Lady Anne Stewart (1614–1646), who married Archibald Douglas, Earl of Angus;
4. Henry (1616–1632), who became the 8th Seigneur d'Aubigny;
5. Francis (1616–1617);
6. Lady Frances (1617–1694), who married Jerome Weston, 2nd Earl of Portland;
7. Margaret (1618–1618), who died young;
8. George (1618–1642), who became the 9th Seigneur d'Aubigny;
9. Ludovic (1619–1665), who became the 10th Seigneur d'Aubigny;
10. Lord John (1621–1644); and
11. Lord Bernard (1623–1645).

In 1624 his brother, 2nd Duke, died without legitimate heirs, her husband became Duke of Lennox and she became duchess. However, his ducal reign lasted less than a year. He died on 30 July 1624 and was succeeded by their eldest son James.

== Father's death and succession ==
In 1618, when she was about 26, her father died committing suicide from "ennui". Being her father's only surviving child, she inherited her father's title and thus became Baroness Clifton in her own right (suo jure).

== Second marriage ==
In about 1627 (Note: The marriage date is constrained by his return from his travels in April 1627 and his wife's excommunication on 3 February 1628.) she married James Hamilton, 2nd Earl of Abercorn.

Katherine and James had three children:

1. James Hamilton, Lord Paisley (c. 1635 – before 1670), was styled Lord Paisley as heir apparent but predeceased his father;
2. William (died before 1670), became a colonel and predeceased his father; and
3. George Hamilton, 3rd Earl of Abercorn (c. 1636 – before 1683), succeeded as the 3rd Earl of Abercorn but died unmarried in Padua.

== Excommunication ==
Her husband was Catholic and she also practised that religion. However, the church of Scotland was Presbyterian and persecuted Catholics. On 3 February 1628, she was excommunicated by the Synod of Paisley.

== Letters ==
Two letters sent by Katherine to William Douglas, 7th Earl of Morton are preserved in the National Library of Scotland collections. These are MS 80 fol 21, undated and MS 80 fol. 22, 29th October 1630. She is addressed in an 'Epistle, To Katherine, Lady Aubigny' by Ben Jonson (The Forest X111).

== Death and timeline ==
She died in 1637 in Scotland. Having been a Catholic, she was buried without ceremony. Her eldest son James succeeded her as Baron Clifton in addition to the titles he inherited from his father.

Timeline
Age	Date	Event
0	1592, about	Born.
16–17	1609	Married Lord Esmé Stewart.
31–32	1624, 30 Jul	First husband died.
34–35	1627, about	Married James Hamilton, 2nd Earl of Abercorn.
35–36	1628, 3 Feb	Excommunicated by the Church of Scotland.
44–45	1637	Died in Scotland.

== Notes ==
Peerage of England
Preceded by Gervase Clifton	Baroness Clifton; 1618–1637	Succeeded by James Stewart
