= James Hamilton, 2nd Earl of Abercorn =

Recusant Scottish nobleman (c. 1604 – c. 1670)

James Hamilton
- Earl of Abercorn
- Tenure: 1618 – c. 1670
- Predecessor: James, 1st Earl of Abercorn
- Successor: George, 3rd Earl of Abercorn
- Born: c. 1604
- Died: c. 1670
- Spouse: Katherine, Dowager Duchess of Lennox (m. 1627)
- Issue Detail: James, George, and others
- Father: James Hamilton
- Mother: Marion Boyd

James Hamilton, 2nd Earl of Abercorn (c. 1604 – c. 1670) was a Catholic Scottish nobleman. He, his wife, his mother, and most of his family were persecuted by the kirk as recusants. Implementing his father's will, he gave his Irish title of Baron Hamilton of Strabane to his younger brother Claud. His younger brothers inherited his father's Irish lands, while he received the Scottish ones, which he squandered away, being deep in debt in his later days.

== Birth and origins ==
Family tree

James Hamilton with wife, parents, and other selected relatives. (Note: This family tree is partly derived from the Abercorn pedigree pictured in Cokayne. Also see the lists of siblings and children in the text.)

James; 2nd Earl; Arran c. 1516 – 1575	Margaret; Douglas
James; 3rd Earl; Arran; 1537–1609	John; 1st Marquess; Hamilton; 1540–1604	Claud; 1st Lord; Paisley; 1546–1621	Margaret; Seton d. 1616
James; 1st Earl; 1575–1618 d.v.p.*	Marion; Boyd d. 1632; Recusant	Claud of Shawfield d. 1614
James; 2nd Earl d. c. 1670	Katherine; C. 2nd Baroness; Clifton c. 1590 – 1637	Claud; 2nd Baron; Strabane d. 1638	George; 1st Bt. Donalong c. 1608 – 1679
George; 3rd Earl c. 1636 – bef. 1683	James; 3rd Baron; Strabane; 1633–1655	George; 4th Baron; Strabane; 1636/7 – 1668	James c. 1630 – 1673
Claud; 4th Earl; 1659–1691	Charles; 5th Earl d. 1701	James; 6th Earl c. 1661 – 1734	Elizabeth; Reading d. 1754

Legend

XXX	Subject of the article	XXX	Earls of Abercorn	XXX	Marquesses & dukes of Hamilton

d.v.p. = predeceased his father (decessit vita patris).

James was born about 1604, (Note: His birth date is derived from Cokayne's statement "he [James Hamilton], though only about 13 years of age, was, on 8 May 1617 ...", which allows to calculate his approximate year of birth as 1604.) probably in Paisley, Scotland. He was the eldest son of James Hamilton and his wife Marion Boyd. His father was an undertaker in the plantation of Ulster and would be created 1st Earl of Abercorn by James VI and I in 1606. His paternal grandfather was Claud Hamilton, 1st Lord of Paisley.

James's mother was the eldest daughter of Thomas Boyd, 6th Lord Boyd of Kilmarnock in Scotland. The Boyds were an old Scottish family, which would in 1661 be granted the title of Earl of Kilmarnock. He had four brothers and four sisters, which are listed in his father's article.

His father had been a Protestant, but his mother, Marion Boyd, was a recusant, who brought him, like all his siblings, up as a Catholic. On 10 April 1606 his father was created Earl of Abercorn and Lord Paisley, Hamilton, Mountcastell and Kilpatrick.

== Baron Hamilton of Strabane ==
On 8 May 1617, when he was only about 12 years old, he was created 1st Baron Hamilton of Strabane, in the peerage of Ireland, with remainder to the heirs male of the body of his father. The purpose of the creation was to give the Abercorns, who were Scottish earls but big landowners in Ireland, a seat in the Irish House of Lords. The title Baron Hamilton of Strabane refers to the town of Strabane in County Tyrone, Ulster, where his father, the 1st Earl of Abercorn, had built a castle during the Plantation of Ulster.

== Earl of Abercorn ==
In 1618 Lord Strabane, as he was now, succeeded his father as the 2nd Earl of Abercorn. His father had predeceased (d.v.p.) his grandfather, Claud Hamilton, 1st Lord Paisley, and had thus never become Lord Paisley.

In 1621 his grandfather, Lord Paisley, died. He succeeded therefore his grandfather as Lord Paisley and inherited the Scottish estates of the family, notably Abercorn and Paisley, as well as Kilpatrick on the northern bank of the Clyde. Since his father had entailed his Irish lands on his younger brothers, he resigned the title of Baron Hamilton of Strabane on 11 November 1633. Charles I, King of England and Scotland then regranted it to his brother Claud.

== Grand tour ==
Sometime in early 1620, Lord Abercorn, as he was now, went to the continent on "his travels" as the Grand Tour was called in his time. He spent several years travelling the continent and visited Catholic countries, France and Italy, which encouraged him in his Catholicism. He returned to Paisley in April 1627.

== Marriage and children ==
In 1627 he married Katherine, Dowager Duchess of Lennox. (Note: The date is constrained by his return from his travels in April 1627 and his wife's excommunication on 3 February 1628.) (Note: Cokayne (1910) places the marriage "about 1632".) He was 22, she was about 34, more than ten years older. She had been married to Lord Esmé Stewart and had had 11 children from him. Her first husband had died in 1624, being the 3rd Duke of Lennox. In November 1632 she obtained a royal license permitting her to retain her precedence as a dowager duchess.

James and Katherine had three sons, but the first two predeceased their father:

1. James (c. 1635 – before 1670), held the courtesy title of Lord Paisley as heir apparent but predeceased his father without producing a male heir
2. William (died before 1670), became a colonel but predeceased his father unmarried in the German wars
3. George (c. 1636 – before 1683), succeeded his father as the 3rd Earl of Abercorn

== Persecution by the Kirk ==
Abercorn's problems with the Church of Scotland (the Kirk) began with the process engaged by the Paisley Presbytery against his mother and some of her servants. In June 1626 she fled to James Law, the Archbishop of Glasgow for protection. The Bishop obtained a letter from the King, written by William Alexander, 1st Earl of Stirling that directed the church not to trouble her as long as she kept quiet. However, in April 1627 Abercorn returned from his travels on the continent and provoked the church by declaring himself openly a Catholic. On 20 January 1628 his mother, the Dowager Countess, was excommunicated by the Paisley Synod of the Church of Scotland. He escaped excommunication only by being absent at the royal court in London. His wife similarly was excommunicated on 3 February.

On 26 August 1632 his mother died in Edinburgh. On 21 August 1637 his wife died at Paisley and was buried "without ceremony" on 17 September. Like his mother she was a recusant. As Catholic, she was buried without religious ceremony. Her title as Baroness Clifton passed to James, her eldest son from her first marriage. At that time his father was deep in debt owing more than 400,000 merks (about £20,000 Sterling) to his creditors. (Note: The merk was worth 13s 4d or 2/3 of a £ Scots. As there were 12 £ Scots to the £ Sterling, the merk was worth about 1 English Shilling.)

In 1649 Abercorn himself was excommunicated by the General Assembly of the Church of Scotland and ordered to leave Scotland.

== Heir male of Hamilton ==
On 11 September 1651, the male line of the dukes of Hamilton failed when William Hamilton, the 2nd Duke died from wounds received at the Battle of Worcester fighting for Charles II against Cromwell. As the Duke had no sons, he was succeeded by his niece Anne Hamilton according to the succession rule of his title (see family tree). It was found however that Abercorn was the heir male, which was thought of no consequence at the time. This status of the Abercorns being heir male later led to a dispute between the houses of Abercorn and Hamilton over the title of Duke of Châtellerault, when this title, which had belonged to James Hamilton, 2nd Earl of Arran, was revived by Napoleon III of France in 1864 in favour of the Duke of Hamilton.

== Sale of Paisley ==
On 22 June 1652 Abercorn sold Paisley to the Earl of Angus for £13,333 6s 8d Scots (about £1100 Sterling). (Note: During the reign of James I, the £ Sterling was 12 £ Scots.) Angus sold it a year later for £160,000 to Lord Cochrane, who would later become the 1st Earl of DunDonald. The 8th Earl of Abercorn would eventually buy Paisley back in 1764.

== Death, succession, and timeline ==
Lord Abercorn died about 1670 and was succeeded by his son George as the 3rd Earl of Abercorn. George, however, died unmarried in Padua. The earldom passed to the descendants of Claud Hamilton, 2nd Baron Hamilton of Strabane.

Timeline
As his birth date is uncertain, so are all his ages.
Age	Date	Event
0	1604, about	Born, probably at Paisley.
1–2	1606, 10 Apr	Father created Earl of Abercorn.
5–6	1610, Apr	Father chosen as an undertaker in James's Plantation of Ulster.
12–13	1617, 8 May	Created Baron Hamilton of Strabane.
13–14	1618, 23 Mar	Father died in Monkton, Ayrshire, Scotland.
16–17	1621	Grandfather died.
20–21	1625, 27 Mar	Accession of King Charles I, succeeding King James I
22–23	1627, Apr	Returned from his travels.
22–23	1627	Married Katherine Clifton.
23–24	1628, 20 Jan	Mother, the Dowager Countess, excommunicated in Paisley Abbey Church.
23–24	1628, 3 Feb	Wife, the Countess, excommunicated in Paisley Abbey Church.
27–28	1632, 26 Aug	Mother died in Edinburgh.
28–29	1633, 11 Nov	Resigned his Irish Peerage in favour of his younger brother Claud.
32–33	1637, 21 Aug	Wife died at Paisley.
44–45	1649, 30 Jan	King Charles I beheaded.
44–45	1649	Excommunicated and ordered to leave Scotland.
46–47	1651, 11 Sep	Became heir male of the Hamiltons.
47–48	1652, 22 Jun	Sold Paisley.
55–56	1660, 29 May	Restoration of King Charles II
65–66	1670, about	Died

== Notes and references ==
=== Sources ===
- Burke, Bernard (1869). A Genealogical and Heraldic Dictionary of the Peerage and Baronetage of the British Empire (31st ed.). London: Harrison. OCLC 1045624502.
- Cokayne, George Edward (1910). Gibbs, Vicary (ed.). The complete peerage of England, Scotland, Ireland, Great Britain and the United Kingdom, extant, extinct, or dormant. Vol. I (2nd ed.). London: St Catherine Press. OCLC 228661424. – Ab-Adam to Basing (for Abercorn)
- Fryde, Edmund Boleslaw; Greenway, D. E.; Porter, S.; Roy, I., eds. (1986). Handbook of British Chronology. Royal Historical Society Guides and Handbooks, No. 2 (3rd ed.). London: Offices of the Royal Historical Society. ISBN 0-86193-106-8. – (for timeline)
- Holmes, Peter (2004). "Hamilton, Claud, first Lord Paisley (1546?–1621)". In Matthew, Colin; Harrison, Brian (eds.). Oxford Dictionary of National Biography. Vol. 24. New York: Oxford University Press. pp. 776–778. ISBN 0-19-861374-1.
- Masson, David, ed. (1889). Register of the Privy Council of Scotland. Vol. IX. Edinburgh: H. M. General Register House. – 1610 to 1613
- Meikle, Maureen M. (2015). The Scottish People 1490–1625. Morrisville, N. C.: Lulu.com. ISBN 978-1-291-51800-9. – (Preview)
- Metcalfe, William Musham (1909). A History of Paisley. Paisley: Alexander Gardner. OCLC 1046586600.
- Millar, Alexander Hastie (1890). "Hamilton, James, first Earl of Abercorn (d.1617)". In Lee, Sidney (ed.). Dictionary of National Biography. Vol. XXIV. New York: MacMillan and Co. pp. 176–177. OCLC 8544105.
- Paul, Sir James Balfour (1904). The Scots Peerage, Founded on Wood's Edition of Sir Robert Douglas's Peerage of Scotland. Vol. I. Edinburgh: David Douglas. OCLC 505064285. – Abercorn to Balmerino (for Abercorn)
- Paul, Sir James Balfour (1908). The Scots Peerage, Founded on Wood's Edition of Sir Robert Douglas's Peerage of Scotland. Vol. V. Edinburgh: David Douglas. OCLC 505064285. – Innermeath to Mar (for Boyd of Kilmallock)
- Paul, Sir James Balfour (1910). The Scots Peerage, Founded on Wood's Edition of Sir Robert Douglas's Peerage of Scotland. Vol. VII. Edinburgh: David Douglas. OCLC 505064285. – Panmure to Sinclair (for Sempill)
- Picamilh, Charles de (1874). Table décennale du bulletin des lois, partie principale, depuis le 1er janvier 1864 jusqu'au 31 décembre 1873 (in French). Paris: Imprimerie Nationale.
- Stirling, The Earl of, ed. (1885). The Earl of Stirling's Register of Royal Letters Relative to the Affairs of Scotland and Nova Scotia from 1615 to 1635. Vol. I. Edinburgh: Burness & Company. OCLC 727022552.

Peerage of Scotland
Preceded by James Hamilton	Earl of Abercorn; 1618 – c. 1670	Succeeded by George Hamilton
Preceded by Claud Hamilton	Lord Paisley; 1621 – c. 1670	Succeeded by George Hamilton
Peerage of Ireland
New creation	Baron Hamilton of Strabane; 1617–1633	Succeeded by Claud Hamilton
