= George Hamilton, 3rd Earl of Abercorn =

Scottish earl (died before 1683)

The Right Honourable; The Earl of Abercorn

Earl of Abercorn
- Tenure: c. 1670 – bef. 1683
- Predecessor: James Hamilton
- Successor: Claud Hamilton
- Born: George Hamilton c. 1636
- Died: before 1683; Padua, Veneto, Italy
- Father: James Hamilton
- Mother: Katherine Clifton

George Hamilton, 3rd Earl of Abercorn (c. 1636 – before 1683) died unmarried in Padua on a voyage to Rome. He was succeeded by Claud Hamilton, heir of Claud Hamilton, 2nd Baron Hamilton of Strabane, second son of the 1st Earl of Abercorn.

== Birth and origins ==
George was born about 1636, probably in Paisley, Scotland, as the third son of James Hamilton and his wife Katherine Clifton. His father was the 2nd Earl of Abercorn.

George's mother was Dowager Duchess of Lennox from her previous marriage and Baroness Clifton of Leighton Bromswold in her own right. Both his parents were Catholic. They had married in 1627. (Note: The date is constrained by his return from his travels in April 1627 and his wife's excommunication on 3 February 1628.) (Note: Cokayne (1910) places the marriage "about 1632.)

He was the youngest of three brothers who are listed in his father's article. His two brothers predeceased his father without producing a male heir.

Family tree

George Hamilton with parents and other selected relatives. He never married. (Note: This family tree is partly derived from the Abercorn pedigree pictured in Cokayne. Also see the list of siblings in the text.)

James; 1st Earl; 1575–1618	Marion; Boyd d. 1632; Recusant
James; 2nd Earl d. 1670	Katherine; 2nd Baroness; Clifton c. 1590 – 1637	Claud; 2nd Baron; H. of Strabane d. 1638
James; Lord; Paisley c. 1635 – bef. 1670	George; 3rd Earl c. 1636 – bef. 1683	James; 3rd Baron; H. of Strabane; 1633–1655	George; 4th Baron; H. of Strabane; 1636/7 – 1668
Claud; 4th Earl; 1659–1691	Charles; 5th Earl d. 1701

Legend

XXX	Subject of the article	XXX	Earls of Abercorn

== Early life ==
On 17 September 1637 his mother died in Scotland when he was about a year old. She was buried without ceremony as she was Catholic. At that time his father was deep in debt owing more than 400,000 merks (about £20,000 Sterling) to his creditors. (Note: The merk was worth 13s 4d or 2/3 of a £ Scots. As there were 12 £ Scots to the £ Sterling, the merk was worth about 1 English Shilling.)

In 1649 his father was excommunicated by the General Assembly of the Church of Scotland as a Catholic and ordered to leave the kingdom. On 22 June 1652 he sold Paisley to the Earl of Angus for £13,333 6s 8d Scots (about £1100 Sterling). (Note: During the reign of James I, the £ Sterling was 12 £ Scots.)

== Father's succession ==
His two elder brothers grew up to reach adulthood but predeceased his father, making him the only surviving son and heir. He therefore succeeded as the 3rd Earl of Abercorn at his father's death in about 1670.

== Death, succession, and timeline ==
Lord Abercorn died in his forties, unmarried, about 1680, in Padua, Veneto, Italy, on his way to Rome,

With his death, the senior line of the Abercorns failed. The title passed to the nearest cadet branch which was that of the barons Hamilton of Strabane, who descended from his uncle Claud. The representative of this line, Claud's grandson, Claud Hamilton, 5th Baron Hamilton of Strabane, therefore became the 4th Earl of Abercorn.

Timeline
As his birth date is uncertain, so are all his ages.
Age	Date	Event
0	1636, about	Born.
0–1	1637, 17 Sep	Mother died in Scotland.
12–13	1649, 30 Jan	King Charles I beheaded.
15–16	1652, 22 Jun	Father sold Paisley.
23–24	1660, 29 May	Restoration of King Charles II
33–34	1670, about	Succeeded his father as the 3rd Earl of Abercorn.
43–44	1680, about	Died in Padua.

== Notes and references ==
=== Sources ===
- Burke, Bernard; Burke, Ashworth Peter (1915). A Genealogical and Heraldic History of the Peerage and Baronetage, the Privy Council, Knightage and Companionage (77th ed.). London: Harrison. OCLC 1155471554.
- Cokayne, George Edward (1892). Complete Peerage of England, Scotland, Ireland, Great Britain and the United Kingdom, Extant, Extinct, or Dormant. Vol. IV (1st ed.). London: George Bell and Sons. OCLC 1180828941. – G to K (for Hamilton of Strabane - citing the 1st version as the letter H of the 2nd is not yet in the public domain)
- Cokayne, George Edward (1910). Gibbs, Vicary (ed.). The complete peerage of England, Scotland, Ireland, Great Britain and the United Kingdom, extant, extinct, or dormant. Vol. I (2nd ed.). London: St Catherine Press. OCLC 228661424. – Ab-Adam to Basing (for Abercorn)
- Cokayne, George Edward (1913). Gibbs, Vicary (ed.). The complete peerage of England, Scotland, Ireland, Great Britain and the United Kingdom, extant, extinct, or dormant. Vol. III (2nd ed.). London: St Catherine Press. OCLC 228661424. – Canonteign to Cutts (for Clifton)
- Debrett, John (1828). Peerage of the United Kingdom of Great Britain and Ireland. Vol. I (17th ed.). London: F. C. and J. Rivington. OCLC 54499602. – England
- Fryde, Edmund Boleslaw; Greenway, D. E.; Porter, S.; Roy, I., eds. (1986). Handbook of British Chronology. Royal Historical Society Guides and Handbooks, No. 2 (3rd ed.). London: Offices of the Royal Historical Society. ISBN 0-86193-106-8. – (for timeline)
- Meikle, Maureen M. (2015). The Scottish People 1490–1625. Morrisville, N. C.: Lulu.com. ISBN 978-1-291-51800-9.
- Metcalfe, William Musham (1909). A History of Paisley. Paisley: Alexander Gardner. OCLC 1046586600.
- Paul, Sir James Balfour (1904). The Scots Peerage, Founded on Wood's Edition of Sir Robert Douglas's Peerage of Scotland. Vol. I. Edinburgh: David Douglas. OCLC 505064285. – Abercorn to Balmerino

Peerage of Scotland
Preceded by James Hamilton	Earl of Abercorn c. 1670 – bef. 1683	Succeeded by Claud Hamilton
