= John Hamilton (Royal Navy officer) =

Royal Navy officer (1714–1755)

The Honourable John Hamilton
- Portrait of John Hamilton by Sir Joshua Reynolds, 1746
- Born: 2 March 1714; England
- Died: 18 December 1755 (aged 41); Portsmouth Harbour, Hampshire
- Spouse(s): Harriet Eliot, née Craggs
- Relatives: James Hamilton, 7th Earl of Abercorn (father)
- Military career
- Allegiance: Great Britain
- Branch: Royal Navy
- Service years: 1737–1755
- Rank: Captain

Captain John Hamilton (2 March 1714 – 18 December 1755) was a Royal Navy officer, the second son of James Hamilton, 7th Earl of Abercorn and Anne Plumer.

== Biography ==
Hamilton chose a career in the Royal Navy and served of West Africa and the West Indies from 1737 to 1740. He was promoted to captain the next year and served throughout the War of the Austrian Succession, mostly in escorting convoys. In 1742, he was given command of HMS Kinsale, and captured a privateer off Dieppe on 7 September. He took command of HMS Augusta in 1744. His portrait by Joshua Reynolds in 1746 brought the artist his initial fame.

In 1749, Hamilton married Harriet Eliot, the daughter of James Craggs and widow of Richard Eliot of Port Eliot (d. 1748). He remained on active service for a few years after the close of the war in 1748, but went on half-pay from 1751 to 1755. He was called back into service as commander of HMS Lancaster, and accidentally drowned while in Portsmouth Harbour. He left three children:

- John Hamilton, 1st Marquess of Abercorn (1756–1818)
- Lady Anne Hamilton (c. 1751 – 4 November 1764)
- Jane Hamilton (1760-1839)
