= James Hamilton, 1st Earl of Abercorn =

Scottish earl and undertaker in Ireland (1575–1618)

James Hamilton
- Earl of Abercorn
- Tenure: 1606–1618
- Successor: James, 2nd Earl of Abercorn
- Born: 12 August 1575
- Died: 23 March 1618 (aged 42); Monkton, Ayrshire, Scotland
- Buried: Paisley Abbey
- Spouse: Marion Boyd
- Issue Detail: James, Claud, George, & others
- Father: Claud Hamilton, 1st Lord Paisley
- Mother: Margaret Seton

James Hamilton, 1st Earl of Abercorn PC (S) (1575–1618), was a Scottish diplomat for James VI and an undertaker (a term for a British colonist) in the Plantation of Ulster in the north of Ireland.

== Birth and origins ==
James was born on 12 August 1575, probably at Paisley, Scotland, the eldest son of Claud Hamilton and his wife Margaret Seton. His father was a younger brother of the 3rd Earl of Arran, and would be created Lord Paisley on 24 July 1587. His paternal grandfather was the 2nd Earl of Arran in the Peerage of Scotland and the Duke of Châtellerault in the Kingdom of France. His father's family descended from Walter FitzGilbert, the founder of the House of Hamilton, who had received the barony of Cadzow from Robert the Bruce.

James's mother was a daughter of George Seton, 7th Lord Seton. (Note: Numbered as the 5th Lord Seton by James Balfour Paul.) His parents had married in 1574 at Niddry Castle, West Lothian, Scotland. Both sides of the family were Scottish, Catholic, and supporters of Mary, Queen of Scots. His father and his father-in-law had both fought for her at Langside in 1568.

As eldest son he was given the courtesy title of Master of Paisley after the Scottish habit. George had four brothers and one sister, who are listed in his father's article.

== Marriage and children ==
Shortly before or in 1592, Master Paisley married Marion, daughter of Thomas Boyd, 6th Lord Boyd. Marion was a prominent Roman Catholic and would in 1628 be excommunicated by the synod of the Church of Scotland in Glasgow after his death.

James and Marion had nine children, five boys:

1. James (c. 1603 – c. 1670), succeeded as the 2nd Earl of Abercorn
2. Claud (died 1638), established himself in Ireland
3. William (died 1681), was created Baronet Hamilton of Westport and represented Henrietta Maria, Charles I's widow, at the pope
4. George (c. 1608 – 1679), was created Baronet Hamilton of Donalong
5. Alexander (died before 4 May 1669), founded the German branch of the family

—and four girls:

1. Anne (1592–1620), married Hugh Sempill, 5th Lord Sempill in 1611
2. Margaret (died 1642), married Sir William Cunninghame of Caprington
3. Isobel (1600–1620)
4. Lucy (born before 1618), for whom a marriage was arranged with Randal MacDonnell, 1st Marquess of Antrim, but the wedding never took place

Family tree

Lord Abercorn with his wife, parents, and other selected relatives. (Note: This family tree is partly derived from the Abercorn pedigree pictured in Cokayne. Also see the lists of siblings and children in the text.)

James; 2nd Earl c. 1516 – 1575; Châtellerault	Margaret; Douglas	George; 7th Lord; Seton; 1531–1586
James; 3rd Earl; 1537–1609	John; 1st Marquess; Hamilton; 1540–1604	Claud; 1st Lord; Paisley; 1546–1621	Margaret; Seton d. 1616
James; 1st Earl; 1575–1618	Marion; Boyd d. 1632; Recusant	George of Greenlaw & Roscrea d. bef. 1657	Frederick; 1590–1647
James; 2nd Earl d. c. 1670	Katherine; 2nd Baroness; Clifton c. 1590 – 1637	Claud; 2nd Baron; Hamilton of Strabane d. 1638	George; 1st Baronet; Donalong c. 1608 – 1679
George; 3rd Earl c. 1636 – bef. 1683	James; 3rd Baron; H. of Strabane; 1633–1655	George; 4th Baron; H. of Strabane; 1636/7 – 1668	James c. 1630 – 1673; Courtier
Claud; 4th Earl; 1659–1691	Charles; 5th Earl d. 1701	James; 6th Earl c. 1661 – 1734

Legend

XXX	Subject of the article	XXX	Earls of Abercorn	XXX	Earls of Arran	XXX	Lords of Seton

== Life in Scotland ==
In 1597, the Master of Paisley sat for Linlithgow in the Parliament of Scotland. He was also made a Gentleman of the Bedchamber and a member of the Privy Council to James VI of Scotland. In 1600, the King created him hereditary Sheriff of Linlithgow. On 2 May 1602, the Master of Paisley carried the basin at the baptism of Robert Stuart, Duke of Kintyre and Lorne at Dunfermline Abbey.

On 24 March 1603, at the Union of the Crowns James VI also became King of England and reigned on both kingdoms in personal union. On 5 April 1603, the Master of Paisley was created Lord Abercorn, of Linlithgowshire. This made him the first of the long line of earls, then marquesses, and finally dukes of Abercorn.

His wife was a close friend of Anne of Denmark. In May 1603 Anne of Denmark came to Stirling Castle hoping to collect her son Prince Henry, who was in the keeping of the Earl of Mar. Anne fainted at dinner and when Jean Drummond and Marion Boyd, Mistress of Paisley, carried her to bed she had a miscarriage. The lawyer Thomas Haddington wrote an account of these events, and said the queen had told her physician Martin Schöner and the Mistress of Paisley that she had taken "some balm water that hastened her abort".

In 1604, Lord Abercorn, as he now was, served on a royal commission established to consider the union of the crowns of England and Scotland. Though the project failed, the king was content with his services. He received large grants of lands in Scotland.

On 10 July 1606 he was further honoured by being created Earl of Abercorn, Baron Paisley, Baron Hamilton, Baron Mountcastell, and Baron Kilpatrick. The family tree shows how the Abercorn title was inherited moving at the death of the 3rd Earl to the descendants of the 2nd son, Claud, and then at the death of the 5th Earl to the descendants of his 4th son, George.

== Plantation of Ulster ==
Lord Abercorn, as he was now, and his brothers Claud Hamilton of Shawfield and George Hamilton of Greenlaw and Roscrea were undertakers in James I's Plantation of Ulster. He appears on the list of undertakers of 1611 and was granted the great proportion of Donalong (2000 acres) and the small proportion of Strabane (1000 acres). He acquired the middle (medium-sized) proportion of Shean from Boyd at a later time. He was given pieces of land called Strabane, Donnalonge and Shean in County Tyrone that had been confiscated from the O'Neill clan. He built a castle at Strabane. His brother Claude Hamilton was given land in County Cavan.

On 11 March 1614, Abercorn was summoned to attend the Parliament of Ireland and was granted the precedence of an earl in Ireland (confirmed by royal warrant on 31 March), although he was not an Irish peer. He was appointed to the Council of Munster on 20 May 1615.

== Death, succession, and timeline ==
The court physician Théodore de Mayerne treated Hamilton for sleeplessness and melancholy caused by overwork in September 1616. He noted that Hamilton had smallpox at the age of two and measles at the age of fifteen.

Lord Abercorn died on 23 March 1618, at Monkton, Ayrshire, Scotland, predeceasing his father and was buried on 29 April 1618 in Paisley Abbey church. (Note: Born on 12 August 1575 and dead on 23 March 1618, his final age was 42 years and seven months, but Cokayne and Paul both give it as 43.)

He predeceased his father by three years and therefore never became Lord Paisley, but, having been created Earl of Abercorn, he did not miss this title. His eldest son, James, aged 14, succeeded him as the 2nd Earl of Abercorn. His widow died in Edinburgh in 1632. His brother, Sir George Hamilton of Greenlaw and Roscrea, helped to bring up the children and to convert them to the Catholic religion.

Timeline
Age	Date	Event
0	1575, 12 Aug	Born, probably at Paisley
16–17	1592, about	Married Marion Boyd
27–28	1603, 24 Mar	Accession of King James I, succeeding Queen Elizabeth I
27	1603, 5 Apr	Created Lord Abercorn, of Linlithgowshire
30	1606, 10 Jul	Created Earl of Abercorn
35–36	1611	Undertaker in James's Plantation of Ulster
42	1618, 23 Mar	Died in Monkton, Ayrshire, Scotland predeceasing his father

== Notes and references ==
=== Sources ===
- Boyd, William K., ed. (1907). Calendar of the State Papers Relating to Scotland and Mary, Queen of Scots 1547–1603. Vol. V. Edinburgh: Her Majesty's General Register House. OCLC 1137227125. – 1574 to 1581
- Burke, Bernard (1869). A Genealogical and Heraldic Dictionary of the Peerage and Baronetage of the British Empire (31st ed.). London: Harrison. OCLC 1045624502.
- Burke, Bernard; Burke, Ashworth Peter (1909). A Genealogical and Heraldic History of the Peerage and Baronetage, the Privy Council, Knightage and Companionage (71st ed.). London: Harrison. OCLC 28297274.
- Burke, Bernard; Burke, Ashworth Peter (1915). A Genealogical and Heraldic History of the Peerage and Baronetage, the Privy Council, Knightage and Companionage (77th ed.). London: Harrison. OCLC 1155471554.
- Chisholm, Hugh, ed. (1910). "Hamilton (family)" . Encyclopædia Britannica. Vol. 12 (11th ed.). Cambridge University Press. pp. 878–879.
- Chisholm, Hugh, ed. (1911). "Abercorn, James Hamilton, 1st Earl of" . Encyclopædia Britannica. Vol. 1 (11th ed.). Cambridge University Press. p. 43.
- Cokayne, George Edward (1910). Gibbs, Vicary (ed.). The complete peerage of England, Scotland, Ireland, Great Britain and the United Kingdom, extant, extinct, or dormant. Vol. I (2nd ed.). London: St Catherine Press. OCLC 228661424. – Ab-Adam to Basing
- Fraser, William (1889). Memorials of the Earls of Haddington. Vol. II. Edinburgh: Privately printed. OCLC 1048813025.
- Fryde, E. B.; Greenway, D. E.; Porter, S.; Roy, I., eds. (1986). Handbook of British Chronology. Royal Historical Society Guides and Handbooks, No. 2 (3rd ed.). London: Offices of the Royal Historical Society. ISBN 0-86193-106-8. – (for timeline)
- Lodge, John (1789). Archdall, Mervyn (ed.). The Peerage of Ireland or, A Genealogical History of the Present Nobility of that Kingdom. Vol. V. Dublin: James Moore. OCLC 264906028. – Viscounts
- Maidment, James (1838). Letters and State Papers during the Reign of James the Sixth. Edinburgh: Edinburgh Printing Company. OCLC 651884245.
- Masson, David, ed. (1889). The Register of the Privy Council of Scotland. Vol. IX. Edinburgh: H. M. General Register House. – 1610 to 1613
- MacNevin, Thomas (1846). The Confiscation of Ulster. Dublin: James Duffy. OCLC 1042430849.
- Metcalfe, William Musham (1909). A History of Paisley. Paisley: Alexander Gardner. OCLC 1046586600.
- Millar, Alexander Hastie (1890). "Hamilton, James, first Earl of Abercorn (d.1617)". In Lee, Sidney (ed.). Dictionary of National Biography. Vol. XXIV. New York: MacMillan and Co. pp. 176–177. OCLC 8544105.
- Paul, Sir James Balfour (1904). The Scots Peerage, Founded on Wood's Edition of Sir Robert Douglas's Peerage of Scotland. Vol. I. Edinburgh: David Douglas. OCLC 505064285. – Abercorn to Balmerino (for Abercorn)
- Paul, Sir James Balfour (1907). The Scots Peerage, Founded on Wood's Edition of Sir Robert Douglas's Peerage of Scotland. Vol. IV. Edinburgh: David Douglas. OCLC 505064285. – Fife to Hyndford (for Walter FitzGilbert)
- Paul, Sir James Balfour (1910). The Scots Peerage, Founded on Wood's Edition of Sir Robert Douglas's Peerage of Scotland. Vol. VII. Edinburgh: David Douglas. OCLC 505064285. – Panmure to Sinclair (for Sempill)
- Paul, Sir James Balfour (1911). The Scots Peerage, Founded on Wood's Edition of Sir Robert Douglas's Peerage of Scotland. Vol. VIII. Edinburgh: David Douglas. OCLC 505064285. – Sumerville to Winton
- Wasser, Michael (2004). "Hamilton, James, first earl of Abercorn (1575–1618)". In Matthew, Colin; Harrison, Brian (eds.). Oxford Dictionary of National Biography. Vol. 24. New York: Oxford University Press. pp. 837–838. ISBN 0-19-861374-1.

Peerage of Scotland
New creation	Baron Abercorn; 1603–1618	Succeeded by James Hamilton
New creation	Earl of Abercorn; 1606–1618	Succeeded by James Hamilton
