= Sir George Hamilton, 1st Baronet, of Donalong =

Scottish-born royalist in Ireland (died 1679)

George Hamilton
- Baronet of Donalong and Nenagh
- Tenure: 1660–1679
- Successor: James Hamilton
- Born: c. 1608
- Died: 1679
- Spouse: Mary Butler
- Issue Detail: James, George, Anthony, Richard, John, Elizabeth, & others
- Father: James, 1st Earl of Abercorn
- Mother: Marion Boyd

Sir George Hamilton, 1st Baronet of Donalong and Nenagh (c. 1608 – 1679), was born in Scotland, but inherited land in Ireland. Despite being Catholic, he served his Protestant brother-in-law, the 1st Duke of Ormond, Lord Lieutenant of Ireland, in diplomatic missions during the Confederate Wars and as receiver-general of the royalists. He also defended Nenagh Castle against the Parliamentarians during the Cromwellian conquest of Ireland. Hamilton was father of Anthony, author of the Mémoires du Comte de Grammont, of Richard, Jacobite general, and of Elizabeth, "la belle Hamilton".

Family tree

George Hamilton with wife, parents, and other selected relatives. He was sometimes confused with his uncle of Greenlaw. (Note: This family tree is based on a drawn pedigree and written genealogies of the Abercorns. Also see the list of children in the text.)

Claud; 1st Ld; Paisley; 1546–1621	Margaret; Seton d. 1616
James; 1st Earl; 1575–1618	Marion; Boyd d. 1632; Recusant	George of Greenlaw & Roscrea d. bef. 1657	Mary; Butler
James; 2nd Earl d. c. 1670	Claud; 2nd Baron; Hamilton of Strabane d. 1638	George; 1st Bt. Donalong c. 1608 – 1679	Mary; Butler d. 1680
James c. 1630 – 1673; Courtier	George d. 1676; Soldier	Anthony c. 1645 – 1719; Writer	Richard c. 1649 – 1717; Soldier
James; 6th Earl c. 1661 – 1734

Legend

XXX	George; Hamilton	XXX	Earls of Abercorn

== Birth and origins ==
George was born about 1608 in Scotland, probably in Paisley, Renfrewshire, near Glasgow. He was the fourth son of James Hamilton and his wife, Marion Boyd. His father had been created Earl of Abercorn by James VI and I in 1606. His paternal grandfather was the 1st Lord Paisley.

George's mother was the eldest daughter of the 6th Lord Boyd, of Kilmarnock, Ayrshire, in the south-west of Scotland. Both grandfathers had fought for Mary, Queen of Scots in 1568 at Langside.

George was one of nine siblings. See his brothers James and Claude. (Note: George's father's article gives a list of all the nine siblings) George's father was a Protestant, but his mother, Marion Boyd, was a recusant.

== Early life ==
Hamilton was about ten in 1618 when his father died. His uncle, Sir George Hamilton of Greenlaw and Roscrea, became his guardian and converted him like all his siblings to the Catholic faith.

Hamilton's father had been an undertaker in James I's 1611 Plantation of Ulster and had as such acquired large estates in Ireland, mainly around Strabane, County Tyrone. Hamilton's eldest brother, James, succeeded as 2nd earl of Abercorn, but the Irish lands were shared among the younger sons according to his father's will. Strabane, the most prestigious part, went to Hamilton's elder brother Claud. Hamilton inherited Donalong, a great proportion (2000 acres). His father had predeceased his paternal grandfather, the 1st Lord Paisley, who died three years later in 1621. Hamilton's eldest brother, James, the 2nd Earl of Abercorn, inherited at that time the title of Lord Paisley and the family's Scottish lands.

By 1625 Hamilton, together with Sir Basil Brooke and Sir George Russell, had acquired rights to the Knockaunderrig Silver Mine at Knockanroe in the Silvermine Mountains near the village of Silvermines, south of Nenagh. In 1627 Hamilton succeeded Sir Roger Hope to the command of a company of foot in the Irish Army. (Note: This was likely the Roger Hope of Hopestown in Westmeath, who sat for Carlingford in the Parliament 1613–1615 and was knighted by Lord Deputy Oliver St John, 1st Viscount Grandison in 1622 on his last day in office.) In 1632 Hamilton's mother died in Edinburgh and was buried with her husband in Paisley Abbey.

By 1634 Hamilton was commonly called Sir George and was supposed to be a knight and a baronet. The territorial designation and the baronetage (country) of this first baronetcy are unknown. A second attempt would later be made to create him a baronet implying that the first one had not succeeded.

== Marriage and children ==
In 1635 Hamilton married Mary Butler, third daughter of Thomas Butler, Viscount Thurles. Her eldest brother, the 12th earl of Ormond, later marquess and duke, and also lord lieutenant of Ireland, thereby became his brother-in-law.

George and Mary had six sons:

1. James (died 1673), became ranger of Hyde Park, turned Protestant, and died from losing a leg in a sea-fight
2. George (died 1676), killed in French service at the Col de Saverne
3. Anthony (c. 1645 – 1719), fought for the Jacobites and wrote the Mémoires du comte de Grammont
4. Thomas (died 1687), served in the Royal Navy and died in Boston, Massachusetts
5. Richard (died 1717), fought for the Jacobites and was taken prisoner at the Boyne
6. John (died 1691), officer in the Irish army, died from wounds received at the Battle of Aughrim

—and three daughters:

1. Elizabeth (1641–1708), a famous beauty, married Philibert de Gramont
2. Lucia (died 1676), married Sir Donough O'Brien, 1st Baronet, of Leamaneh Castle, a Protestant, in 1674
3. Margaret, married in July 1674 Mathew Forde of Seaforde, County Down, and of Coolgreany, County Wexford

== Mistaken identity ==
Hamilton shared his name and surname with his paternal uncle George, his guardian. Their wives also shared their names: both being called Mary Butler. The younger Mary was his wife, whereas the elder was a daughter of Walter, 11th Earl of Ormond. The younger couple lived at Nenagh, the elder at Roscrea. Carte (1736) already confused them. Hamilton married in 1635, but earlier dates are reported in error due to the confusion. (Note: Burke's Peerage (1915) cites a marriage contract dated the 2 June 1629, but Manning cites one dated 14 February 1630.. His granduncle's marriage seems therefore to have been in 1630 rather than in 1629.)

== Midlife ==
In May 1640, Ormond, Hamilton's brother-in-law, granted him the manor, castle, town, and lands of Nenagh for 31 years. Ormond was appointed lieutenant-general (commander-in-chief) of the Irish army in September.

In 1641 Hamilton accompanied King Charles I on his visit to Scotland. At the outbreak of the Irish Rebellion on 23 October 1641, Hamilton was in England and was suspected of supporting the rebellion as he was Catholic. He was arrested and shortly held at the Tower of London but was soon released on bail.

Jean Gordon, widow of his elder brother Claud (died in 1638), lost her home when Phelim O'Neill burned Strabane Castle in December 1641. Hamilton, her brother in law, accommodated her and her children at Nenagh.

In February 1642 the Knockaunderrig Silver Mine, which Hamilton operated together with Basil Brooke and Sir William Russell, was attacked by local rebels led by Hugh O'Kennedy and his English miners were killed.

In March 1646 Ormond concluded the 1st Ormond Peace. It was proclaimed on 30 July in Dublin. In Limerick its proclamation was violently prevented by the clerical party in August. Ormond sent Hamilton to Limerick to talk to the Irish about the need for unity.

In May 1646, Hamilton's wife and children left Nenagh and were brought to Dublin for their security. Similar rescues were organised for his mother-in-law, Lady Thurles, and his sisters-in-law, Lady Muskerry and Lady Loughmoe. In June at Benburb the Confederate Ulster army under Owen Roe O'Neill defeated the Covenanters under Robert Monro. O'Neill then marched south to Kilkenny as directed by Rinuccini, the papal nuncio. Leinster and Munster were treated as enemy territory. On 17 September 1646, O'Neill took Roscrea, but Nenagh was not attacked at that time. O'Neill then menaced Dublin in November 1646.

In January 1647 Hamilton returned to Dublin with instructions from the king directing Ormond to hand Dublin over to the English rather than to the Irish. Ormond abandoned Dublin in July to the parliamentarians and left for England.

Phelim MacTuoll O'Neill stormed Nenagh in 1648, but it was retaken by Inchiquin in the same year by undermining the castle's wall. Hamilton seems to have been elsewhere. In August he was with Ormond in France at the queen's court at the Château-Neuf de Saint-Germain-en-Laye. On 21 September Hamilton left Saint-Germain with the queen's instructions and brought them to Ormond at Le Havre where a Dutch man-of-war, sent by William II, Prince of Orange, lay ready to bring Ormond to Cork where he landed on 29 September 1648. In January 1649 Ormond appointed Hamilton receiver-general of the revenues for Ireland succeeding to Lord Roscommon. He was also made colonel of a regiment of foot and appointed governor of Nenagh Castle. Near the end of 1650 when the parliamentarian army under Henry Ireton was on its way back from the unsuccessful siege of Limerick to its winter quarters at Kilkenny, troops under Daniel Abbot attacked Nenagh Castle, which Hamilton tried to defend. He surrendered the castle end of October or beginning November after the Parliamentarians had menaced to breach its walls with artillery.

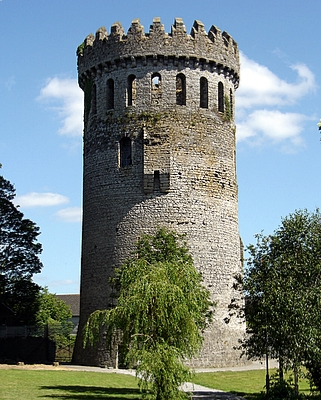
The keep of Nenagh Castle

== French exile ==
Hamilton's Irish lands were confiscated by the parliamentarians, and in spring 1651 he and his family followed Ormond into French exile. They first went to Caen where Ormond's wife Elizabeth Preston lived since 1648. Lady Ormond with her children returned to England in August 1652, whereas Lady Hamilton went to Paris where she lived in the convent of the Feuillantines. In 1656 or 1657 Charles II sent him, together with Donough MacCarty, 2nd Viscount Muskerry, to Madrid on a diplomatic mission.

== Restoration, death, and timeline ==
The Restoration in May 1660 brought Charles II on the English throne. Hamilton returned to London with his elder children James and George, who became courtiers at Whitehall.

About 1660 Charles II seems to have created him a baronet for a second time. This baronetcy was styled of Donalong and Nenagh. It may have been in the baronetage of Ireland, Scotland, or Nova Scotia. His grandson James, who should have succeeded as the 2nd baronet, never claimed the title, which might again have been invalid.

Hamilton was joined by his wife and their younger children in 1661. They lived for some time all together in a house near Whitehall. Hamilton's lands in Ulster were restored to him. In 1668 he also received land at Ballymacshanroe, on Great Island, County Cork, which he sold soon afterwards. In 1670 he was granted lands in several counties of Ireland.

Hamilton died in 1679. As his eldest son, James, had predeceased him in 1673, Hamilton was succeeded by his grandson James, who would later become the 6th earl of Abercorn.

Timeline
As his birth date is uncertain, so are all his ages. Italics for historical background.
Age	Date	Event
0	About 1608	Born in Scotland as the 4th son of James Hamilton, 1st Earl of Abercorn
9–10	23 Mar 1618	Father died at Monkton, Ayrshire, Scotland.
12–13	1621	Grandfather died.
16–17	27 Mar 1625	Accession of Charles I, succeeding James I
18–19	16 Oct 1627	Made commander of a company of the Irish Army
23–24	26 Aug 1632	Mother died in Edinburgh.
26–27	1635	Married Mary Butler
31–32	1 May 1640	Ormond grants him Nenagh for 31 years.
32–33	23 Oct 1641	Outbreak of the Rebellion
32–33	1641	Arrested as a papist while in England
33–34	2 Feb 1642	Lost the Knockaunderrig Silver Mine raided by the insurgents
33–34	30 Aug 1642	Ormond created marquess
34–35	15 Sep 1643	Cessation (truce) between the Confederates and the government
34–35	13 Nov 1643	Ormond appointed Lord Lieutenant of Ireland
37–38	5 Jun 1646	Battle of Benburb
37–38	17 Sep 1646	Ulster Army captured Roscrea
38–39	28 Jul 1647	Ormond abandoned Dublin to the Parliamentarians.
39–40	29 Sep 1648	Ormond returned to Ireland landing at Cork.
40–41	Jan 1649	Appointed receiver-general of revenues in Ireland.
40–41	30 Jan 1649	Charles I beheaded.
41–42	Oct 1650	Surrendered Nenagh Castle to the Parliamentarians under Ireton
42–43	Early in 1651	Followed Ormond into French exile
51–52	29 May 1660	Restoration of Charles II
51–52	About 1660	Created Baronet of Donalong and Nenagh
64–65	6 Jun 1673	Son James died from wounds received in a sea-fight against the Dutch.
67–68	Jun 1676	Son George killed at the Col de Saverne in French service
70–71	1679	Died, succeeded by his grandson James, the future 6th Earl of Abercorn

== Notes and references ==
=== Sources ===
Subject matter monographs:

- Wasser 2004 as co-subject in "James Hamilton, first earl of Abercorn", Oxford Dictionary of National Biography

- Airy, Osmund (1886). "Butler, James, twelfth Earl and first Duke of Ormonde (1610–1688)". In Lee, Sidney (ed.). Dictionary of National Biography. Vol. VIII. New York: MacMillan and Co. pp. 52–60. OCLC 8544105.
- Bellings, Richard (1891). Gilbert, John Thomas (ed.). History of the Irish Confederation and the War in Ireland 1646-1649. Vol. III (limited to two hundred copies ed.). Dublin: Printed for the editor by Joseph Dollard. – 1646 to 1649
- Boulger, Demetrius Charles (1911). The Battle of the Boyne. London: Martin Secker. OCLC 1041056932.
- Burke, Bernard (1869). A Genealogical and Heraldic Dictionary of the Peerage and Baronetage of the British Empire (31st ed.). London: Harrison. OCLC 1045624502. (for his children)
- Burke, Bernard; Burke, Ashworth Peter (1915). A Genealogical and Heraldic History of the Peerage and Baronetage, the Privy Council, Knightage and Companionage (77th ed.). London: Harrison. OCLC 1155471554.
- Carte, Thomas (1851) [1st pub. 1736]. The Life of James Duke of Ormond. Vol. III (New ed.). Oxford: Oxford University Press. OCLC 1086656347. – 1643 to 1660
- Clark, Ruth (1921). Anthony Hamilton: his Life and Works and his Family. London: John Lane. OCLC 459281163.
- Coffey, Diarmid (1914). O'Neill and Ormond – A Chapter of Irish History. Dublin: Maunsel & Company. OCLC 906164979.
- Cusack, M. F. (1871). A Compendium of Irish History. Boston: Patrick Donahoe. OCLC 1042465804.
- Duffy, Seán (2002). The Illustrated History of Ireland. New York: Contemporary Books. ISBN 0-8092-2437-2.
- Elliott, Marianne (2000). The Catholics of Ulster, a History. London: Allen Lane The Penguin Press. ISBN 0-713-99464-9.
- Ferrar, J. (1787). The History of Limerick, Ecclesiastical, Civil and Military, From the Earliest Records, to the Year 1787. Limerick: A. Watson & Co. OCLC 560174421.
- Fryde, E. B.; Greenway, D. E.; Porter, S.; Roy, I., eds. (1986). Handbook of British Chronology. Royal Historical Society Guides and Handbooks, No. 2 (3rd ed.). London: Offices of the Royal Historical Society. ISBN 0-86193-106-8. – (for timeline)
- Gardiner, Samuel R. (1893). History of the Great Civil War 1642–1649. Vol. III (New ed.). London: Longmans, Green & Co. OCLC 174542284. – 1645 to 1647
- G. E. C. (1895). Complete Peerage of England, Scotland, Ireland, Great Britain and the United Kingdom, Extant, Extinct, or Dormant. Vol. VI (1st ed.). London: George Bell and Sons. OCLC 1180818801. – N to R (for Ormond)
- G. E. C. (1903). Complete Baronetage, 1611 to 1800. Vol. III (1st ed.). Exeter: William Pollard & Co. OCLC 866278985. – 1649 to 1664 (for Baronet of Donalong)
- G. E. C. (1910). Gibbs, Vicary (ed.). The Complete Peerage of England, Scotland, Ireland, Great Britain and the United Kingdom, Extant, Extinct, or Dormant. Vol. I (2nd ed.). London: The St Catherine Press. OCLC 1042385438. – Ab-Adam to Basing (for Abercorn)
- Gleeson, Dermot F. (1936). "The Castle and Manor of Nenagh". The Journal of the Royal Society of Antiquaries of Ireland. 7. 6 (2): 247–269. JSTOR 25513829.
- Gleeson, Dermot F. (1937). "The Silver Mines of Ormond". The Journal of the Royal Society of Antiquaries of Ireland. 67: 101–116.
- Graham, John (1841). Ireland Preserved; or the Siege of Londonderry and the Battle of Aughrim with Lyrical Poetry and Biographical Notes (2nd ed.). Dublin: Hardy and Walker. OCLC 00992682. – Short biographies in the biographical notes
- Hayes-McCoy, G. A. (1990) [1st pub. 1969]. Irish Battles: A Military History of Ireland. Belfast: The Appletree Press. ISBN 0-86281-250-X.
- Holmes, Peter (2004). "Hamilton, Claud, first Lord Paisley (1546?–1621)". In Matthew, Colin; Harrison, Brian (eds.). Oxford Dictionary of National Biography. Vol. 24. New York: Oxford University Press. pp. 776–778. ISBN 0-19-861374-1.
- House of Commons (1878). Return. Members of Parliament – Part II. Parliaments of Great Britain, 1705–1796. Parliaments of the United Kingdom, 1801–1874. Parliaments and Conventions of the Estates of Scotland, 1357–1707. Parliaments of Ireland, 1599–1800. London: His/Her Majesty's Stationery Office. OCLC 13112546.
- Lodge, John (1789a). Archdall, Mervyn (ed.). The Peerage of Ireland or, A Genealogical History of the Present Nobility of that Kingdom. Vol. IV. Dublin: James Moore. OCLC 264906028. – Viscounts (for Butler, Viscount Mountgarret)
- Lodge, John (1789b). Archdall, Mervyn (ed.). The Peerage of Ireland or, A Genealogical History of the Present Nobility of that Kingdom. Vol. V. Dublin: James Moore. OCLC 264906028. – Viscounts (for Viscount Strabane)
- Mahaffy, Robert Pentland, ed. (1900). Calendar of the State Papers Relating to Ireland, of the Reign of Charles I. 1633–1647. London: His/Her Majesty's Stationery Office.
- Manning, Conleth (2001). "The Two Sir George Hamiltons and their Connections with the Castles of Roscrea and Nenagh" (PDF). Tipperary Historical Journal: 149–154.
- Millar, A. H. (1890). "Hamilton, James, first Earl of Abercorn (d.1617)". In Lee, Sidney (ed.). Dictionary of National Biography. Vol. XXIV. New York: MacMillan and Co. pp. 176–177. OCLC 8544105.
- Paul, James Balfour, ed. (1904). The Scots Peerage, Founded on Wood's Edition of Sir Robert Douglas's Peerage of Scotland. Vol. I. Edinburgh: David Douglas. OCLC 505064285. – Abercorn to Balmerino
- Paul, James Balfour, ed. (1908). The Scots Peerage, Founded on Wood's Edition of Sir Robert Douglas's Peerage of Scotland. Vol. V. Edinburgh: David Douglas. OCLC 505064285. – Innermeath to Mar (for Boyd of Kilmarnock)
- Perceval-Maxwell, Michael (2004). "Butler [née Preston] Elizabeth, duchess of Ormond and suo jure Lady Dingwall (1615–1684)". In Matthew, Henry Colin Gray.; Harrison, Brian (eds.). Oxford Dictionary of National Biography. Vol. 9. New York: Oxford University Press. pp. 130–131. ISBN 0-19-861359-8.
- Perceval-Maxwell, Michael (October 2009). "Butler, James". In McGuire, James; Quinn, James (eds.). Dictionary of Irish Biography (online ed.).
- Rigg, J. M. (1890). "Hamilton, Anthony (1646?–1720)". In Lee, Sidney (ed.). Dictionary of National Biography. Vol. XXIV. New York: MacMillan and Co. pp. 135–137. OCLC 8544105.
- Sergeant, Philip W. (1913). Little Jennings and Fighting Dick Talbot: A Life of the Duke and Duchess of Tyrconnel. Vol. I. London: Hutchinson & Co. OCLC 474495830. – 1643 to 1685
- R. Y. (16 March 1833). "Nenagh Castle, County of Tipperary". Dublin Penny Journal. 1 (38). Dublin: J. S. Folds.
- Sewall, Samuel (1878). Diary of Samuel Sewall. Vol. I. Boston, Massachusetts: The Massachusetts Historical Society. OCLC 1042962308. – 1674 to 1700
- Shaw, William A. (1906). The Knights of England. Vol. II. London: Sherratt & Hughes. – Knights bachelors & Index
- Stubbs (1919). "County Louth Representatives in the Irish Parliament 1613–1758". Journal of County Louth Archaeological Society. 4 (4): 311–317. doi:10.2307/27729225.
- Warner, Ferdinand (1768a). History of the Rebellion and Civil-War in Ireland. Vol. I. Dublin: James William. OCLC 82770539. – 1641 to 1643
- Warner, Ferdinand (1768b). History of the Rebellion and Civil-War in Ireland. Vol. II. Dublin: James William. OCLC 82770539. – 1643 to 1660 and index
- Wasser, Michael (2004). "Hamilton, James, first earl of Abercorn (1575–1618)". In Matthew, Colin; Harrison, Brian (eds.). Oxford Dictionary of National Biography. Vol. 24. New York: Oxford University Press. pp. 837–838. ISBN 0-19-861374-1.
- Wauchope, Piers (2004b). "Hamilton, Richard (d. 1717)". In Matthew, Colin; Harrison, Brian (eds.). Oxford Dictionary of National Biography. Vol. 24. New York: Oxford University Press. pp. 888–889, right column. ISBN 0-19-861374-1.

Baronetage of Ireland
New creation	Baronet (of Donalong, Tyrone); 1660–1679	Succeeded by James Hamilton
