= Old English Bulldog =

Old English bulldog
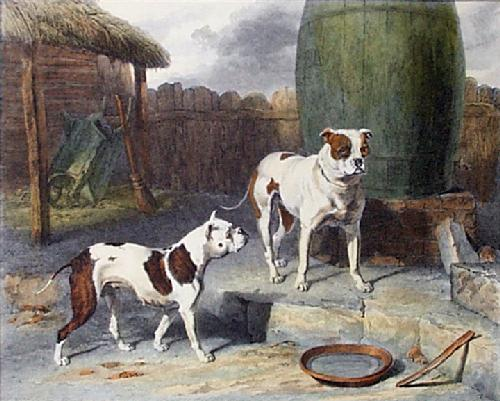
- Crib and Rosa
- Origin: England
- Breed status: Extinct

The Old English Bulldog is an extinct breed of dog.

== Physical characteristics ==
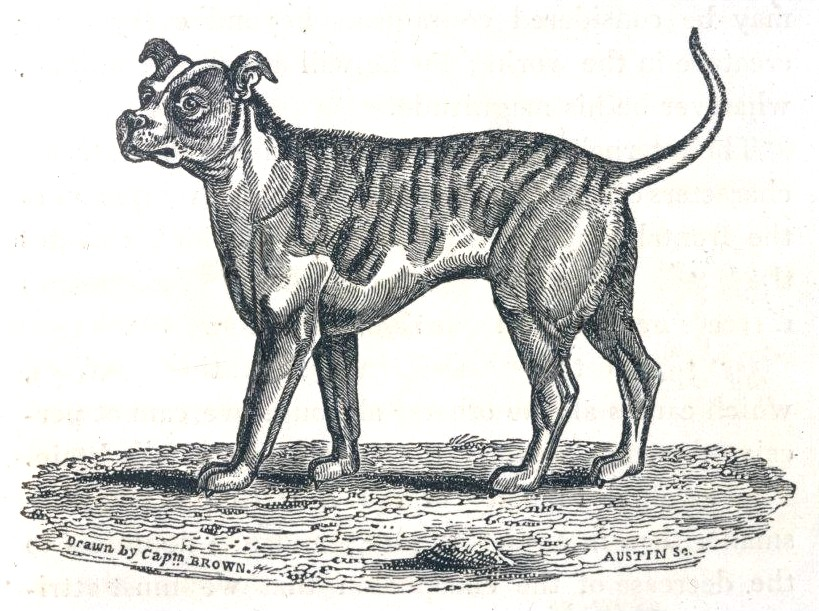
The Bull-Dog. Thomas Brown, c. 1829

The Old English Bulldog was compact, broad and muscular, as reflected in the painting Crib and Rosa. Through John Scott's engraving, this painting became the best-known and most reproduced painting of dogs from that period. As described in the Philo-kuon standard from 1865, the average height was approximately 15 inches (380 mm), and they weighed about 45 pounds (20 kg).

== History ==
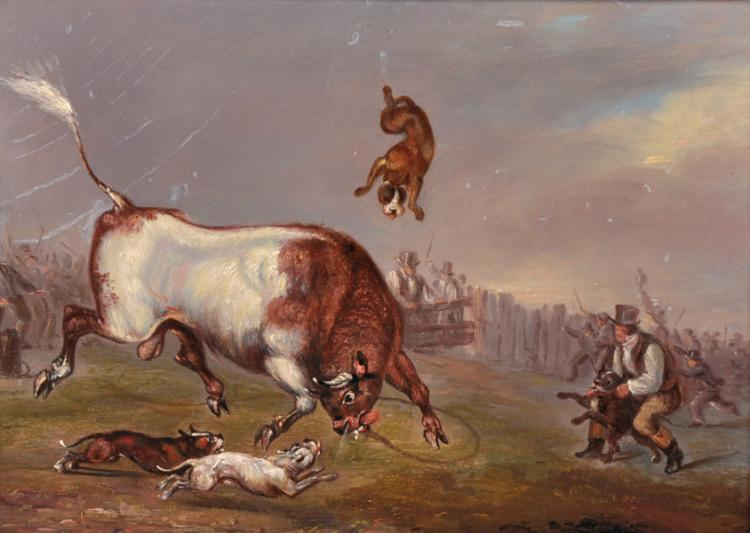
Bull-baiting scene

The English blood sport of bull-baiting allowed for a specialized breed in the form of the Old English Bulldog. The main locations in London for these exhibitions were the Westminster Pit, Beargarden and Old Conduit Fields.

=== Breeding ===
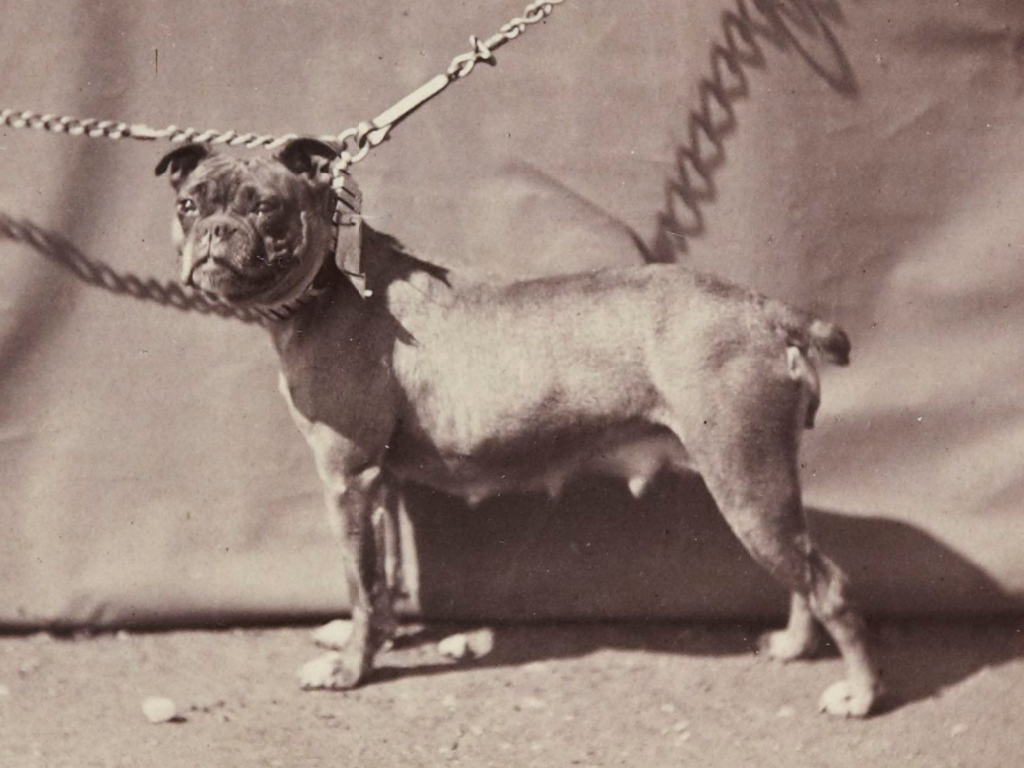
Old English Bulldog. Paris, 1863

Historians are fairly confident that the Old English Bulldog is derived from ancient war dogs, such as the old Mastiff or the extinct Alaunt dog. Others believe that the true origin of the breed is not entirely clear. Depictions in old prints show that the variety was without doubt a small Mastiff with a comparatively long head. The word 'Mastiff' was eventually dropped when describing these smaller Mastiffs, as the Mastiff proper was found too slow for bull-baiting.

=== Description ===
Two other recognized members of the breed can be seen in the 1817 painting Crib and Rosa, with Rosa exemplifying the form and size of the ideal type of Old English Bulldog, albeit deficient in wrinkles about the head and neck and in substance of bone in the limbs.

Many authors bring us descriptions about the extinct bulldog, but this description by William Hamilton Maxwell stands out as one of the most extensive:

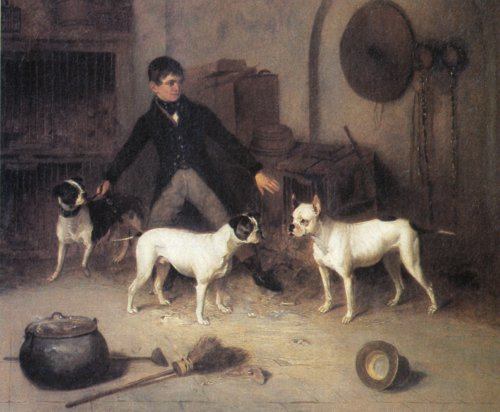
Kennel boy and bulldogs, 1843

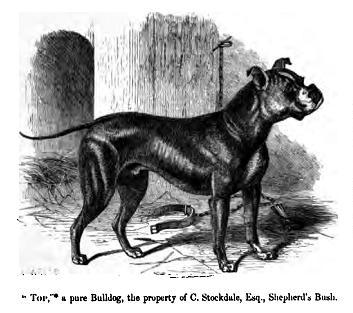
A pure bulldog, 1859

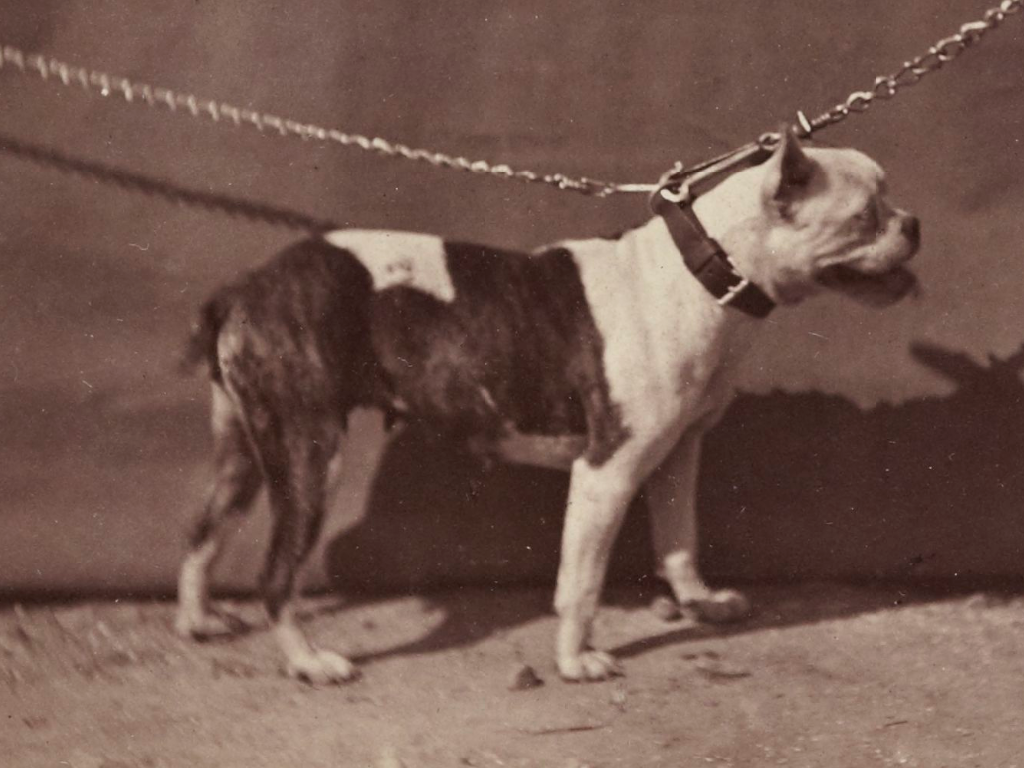
Old English Bulldog with prick ears, Paris, 1863

BULL-DOG (Canis Molossus), s. A dog of particular form, remarkable for his courage.
The bull-dog is low in stature, deep-chested, and strongly made about the shoulders and thighs, the muscles of both of which are extremely developed. His head is broad, his nose short, and the under jaw projects beyond the upper, which gives him a fierce and disagreeable aspect. His eyes are distant and prominent, and have a peculiar suspicious-like leer, which, with the distension of his nostrils, gives him also a contemptuous look; and from his teeth being always seen, he has the constant appearance of grinning, while he is perfectly placid. He is the most ferocious and unrelenting of the canine tribe, and may be considered courageous beyond every other creature in the world, for he will attack any animal, whatever be his magnitude.

The internal changes which determine the external characters of this dog, consist in a great development of the frontal sinuses, a development which elevates the bones of the forehead above the nose, and draws the cerebral cavity in the same direction.

But the most important quality, and that, perhaps, which causes all the others, although we cannot perceive the connexion, is the diminution of the brain. The cerebral capacity of the bull-dog is sensibly smaller than in any other race; and it is doubtless to the decrease of the encephalon that we must attribute its inferiority to all others in every thing relating to intelligence. The bull-dog is scarcely capable of any education, and is fitted for nothing but combat and ferocity.

This animal takes his name from his having been employed, in former times, in assaulting the bull, and he is used for the same purpose at the present day, in those districts where this brutal amusement is still practised.

Nothing can exceed the fury with which the bull-dog falls upon all other animals, and the invincible obstinacy with which he maintains his hold. In attacking the bull, he always assails him in front, and generally fastens upon his lip, tongue, or eye, where he holds and hangs on, in spite of the most desperate efforts of the other to free himself from his antagonist, which affords ample proof of the amazing strength and power of this animal.

Whenever a bull-dog attacks any of the extremities of the body, it is invariably considered a mark of his degeneracy from the original purity of blood. Puppies will assail a bull, and thereby give a decided proof of their breed, when only six months old; and, if permitted, will rather suffer themselves to be destroyed than relinquish the contest.

Although this trial is sometimes made with the whelps of a particular litter, to demonstrate the purity of their descent, and to prove that there has been no improper cross by which the future fame of their posterity may be affected, yet they are seldom entered in a regular ring until from fifteen to eighteen months old. But their ligaments cannot be considered as at their full strength until they are at least two years old. Indeed, amateurs say, that they are not at their prime until they have attained four or five years of age.

The bull-dog is admitted by naturalists to be one of the original and peculiar races of Britain, and may be ranked, in point of originality, with the shepherd’s dog and Irish greyhound. In various districts of England this breed is still preserved in its native purity, by that class of people who delight in bullbaiting and fighting of dogs; both of which amusements, alike inhuman, are now happily on the decline. — Brown.

— William Hamilton Maxwell. The Field Book, 1833. Pages 80 & 81

=== Decline ===
Wasp, Child and Billy

In England, the passage of the Cruelty to Animals Act 1835 caused a decline of bull-baiting and dog fighting, leading to a lack of interest in perpetuating the Old English Bulldog. Three dogs from the Duke of Hamilton's strain of Old English Bulldog, Wasp, Child, and Billy, were depicted in a painting and recognized as some of the last known members of the breed before it became extinct.

Despite the laws making dog fighting illegal, it continued for many years. Breeders determined a cross between the Old English Bulldog and Old English Terrier created a superior fighting dog with increased quickness and dexterity. This new breed of dog, called the bull and terrier, was a precursor to the Staffordshire Bull Terrier, Bull Terrier and American Pit Bull Terrier and accelerated the extinction of the Old English Bulldog.

== English Bulldog ==
Sometimes confused with the Old English Bulldog, the modern English Bulldog is a Companion dog noted for its stocky body, short legs and considerable underbite. The modern English Bulldog does not have the speed and agility that were the definitive characteristics of the Old English Bulldog and was never used for dogfighting or bull-baiting.

== See also ==
- Bulldog type
- List of dog breeds
- List of dog fighting breeds
- List of extinct dog breeds
