= Douglas-Hamilton =

Arms of the Head of the Douglas-Hamiltons, the Duke of Hamilton

Douglas-Hamilton is the family surname of the Dukes of Hamilton and Earls of Selkirk.

Anne Hamilton, 3rd Duchess of Hamilton, was the only child of James Hamilton, 1st Duke of Hamilton, who survived him. After the death in 1651 of her uncle, William Hamilton, 2nd Duke of Hamilton, Anne was the duchess in her own right and head of the Clan Hamilton. She married William Douglas, 1st Earl of Selkirk, in 1656. William was a younger son of the Marquess of Douglas. She successfully petitioned King Charles II for her husband to be made the 3rd duke, and the surname at some point became Douglas-Hamilton.

Upon the death of a cousin, the Duke of Douglas, in 1761 without heir, his subsidiary titles and the nominal seniority of the Clan Douglas were devolved onto the 7th Duke of Hamilton. These titles are:

- Marquess of Douglas
- Earl of Angus
- Lord Abernethy and Jedburgh Forest

The arms of the head of the house are: Quarterly; 1st and 4th grandquarters, counterquartered (i) and (iv) Gules, three cinquefoils Ermine (for Hamilton), (ii) and (iii) Argent, a lymphad Sable, sails furled proper, flagged-Gules (for The Isles (Arran)); 2nd and 3rd grandquarters, Argent, a man's heart Gules ensigned with an imperial crown proper, on a chief Azure three stars of the First (for Douglas).

Following are listed the dukes and duchesses of Hamilton with the compound surname:

- William Douglas-Hamilton, 12th Duke of Hamilton (1845–1895)
- Alfred Douglas-Hamilton, 13th Duke of Hamilton (1862–1940)
  - Nina Douglas-Hamilton, Duchess of Hamilton (1878–1951), English animal rights activist, wife of the 13th duke and mother of the 14th
- Douglas Douglas-Hamilton, 14th Duke of Hamilton (1903–1973), English Member of Parliament, Royal Air Force air commodore and the first person to fly over Mount Everest
  - Elizabeth Douglas-Hamilton, Duchess of Hamilton (1916–2008), wife of the 14th duke
- Angus Douglas-Hamilton, 15th Duke of Hamilton (1938–2010), son of the 14th duke
- Alexander Douglas-Hamilton, 16th Duke of Hamilton (born 1978)

Other members of the family include:

- Angus Douglas-Hamilton (1863–1915), Scottish lieutenant-colonel in the British Army posthumously awarded the Victoria Cross
- Audrey Douglas-Hamilton, Countess of Selkirk (1903–1994), British alpine skiing champion and pioneering aviator, wife of George Douglas-Hamilton
- Lord David Douglas-Hamilton (1912–1944), Scottish Royal Air Force squadron leader and Olympic bronze-medalist boxer, son of the 13th duke, brother of the 14th duke, George Douglas-Hamilton and Malcolm Douglas-Hamilton
- Frederick Robert Vere Douglas-Hamilton (1843–1917), Scottish engineer
- George Douglas-Hamilton, 10th Earl of Selkirk (1906–1994), British First Lord of the Admiralty, Royal Air Force group captain, member of the House of Lords and Chancellor of the Duchy of Lancaster, brother of the 14th duke, David Douglas-Hamilton and Malcolm Douglas-Hamilton
- H. A. Douglas-Hamilton (1853–1929), English Anglican priest, Archdeacon of Kimberley in South Africa, brother of Angus Douglas-Hamilton
- Iain Douglas-Hamilton (born 1942), Scottish zoologist, grandson of the 14th duke
- James Douglas-Hamilton, Baron Selkirk of Douglas (1942–2023), Scottish Member of Parliament, later member of the House of Lords as a life peer
- Jamie Douglas-Hamilton, 21st century adventurer, a member of teams who set rowing world records for fastest and longest crossings of the Indian Ocean and accomplished the first man-powered crossing of Drake Passage, the body of water between South America and Antarctica, grandson of the 14th duke
- Lord Malcolm Douglas-Hamilton (1909–1964), Scottish Royal Air Force group captain and Member of Parliament, son of the 13 duke and brother of the 14th duke, David Douglas-Hamilton and George Douglas-Hamilton
  - Lady Malcolm Douglas-Hamilton (1909–2013), American socialite and philanthropist, wife of the above
- Lady Mary Douglas-Hamilton (1850–1922), Princess of Monaco by marriage, ancestress of Albert II of Monaco and the youngest child and only daughter of William Hamilton, 11th Duke of Hamilton
- Saba Douglas-Hamilton (born 1970), Kenyan wildlife conservationist and television presenter, great-granddaughter of the 13th duke
