= Jill, Duchess of Hamilton =

British writer and environmentalist (1940–2018)

Jill, Duchess of Hamilton (née Jillian Robertson; 30 January 1940 – 22 April 2018) was an Australian-born British journalist, environmentalist, and author.

== Early life and career ==
Jillian Robertson was born in Sydney on 30 January 1940. Her father was a First World War veteran. She grew up in Townsville, Queensland, Australia. After her return to Sydney in 1961, she trained as a newspaper reporter under Donald Horne.

In 1964, Robertson was sent to report from London. On her assignments she visited Afghanistan, India, Russia, Tahiti, the United States, and Vietnam. She interviewed, among others, the Dalai Lama, politicians Jawaharlal Nehru and Indira Gandhi, writers Nancy Mitford and P. G. Wodehouse, and actors Marlon Brando and Richard Burton. In November 1963, she attended a dinner for US president John F. Kennedy, who was assassinated four days later. In 1965, she became one of the first women to write about the effects of bombing raids during the Vietnam War.

== Personal life ==
Robertson's career in journalism was cut short in 1967 by a pregnancy and subsequent marriage to fellow journalist Martin Page. Their son, Sebastian James, was born in April 1969. They eventually divorced. She next married Edward Hulton, who came from a family of newspaper proprietors. This marriage also ended in divorce. While writing a book about Napoleon in the late 1980s she met Angus Douglas-Hamilton, 15th Duke of Hamilton. Robertson married the premier peer of Scotland in 1988 and became a dedicated châtelaine of Lennoxlove. Both were interested in nature, environmental conservation, and animal rights. Their divorce in 1995 was attributed in part to the duke's alcoholism. She was a close friend of the naturalist Dame Miriam Rothschild and later of Prince and Princess Michael of Kent.

After her third divorce, she decided that she would not marry again and resumed work as a journalist. The divorce left her known as Jill, Duchess of Hamilton, a title she came to dislike and which she asked to be removed from her byline. She was once asked about the correct form of address for a divorced duchess, replying: "I have absolutely no bloody idea, and please don't tell me."

== Projects ==
In 1995, Robertson raised money for a war memorial at Battersea Park in London for Australian soldiers who died in Europe and the Middle East during the First and Second World Wars. She also organized a dawn service on Anzac Day. The memorial eventually led to the government of Australia building the Australian War Memorial in London.

Starting in 2000, she published a series of books, starting with many on gardening. Among these are Scottish Plants for Scottish Gardens (1996), English Plants for Your Garden (2000) and The Gardens of William Morris (1998), the last of which saw multiple translations. She simultaneously won medals at the Chelsea Flower Show. She served as vice-president of both the Royal Society for the Prevention of Cruelty to Animals and of Butterfly Conservation.

In Marengo, the Myth of Napoleon's Horse (2000) she explored the history of Napoleon's favourite war horse, Marengo, and identified one of his hooves. In God, Guns and Israel (2009), which saw multiple editions and a translation into Italian, she identified the numerous evangelical Christians in the cabinet of Arthur Balfour who supported the creation of Israel. A First World War poetry anthology, Gallipoli to Gaza (2003), was also published. In First to Damascus (2002) she argued that Damascus was captured not by T. E. Lawrence but by the Australian Light Horse. Her writing style reflected her enthusiasm for research and a Catholic approach, but she was never religious.

She developed a strong interest in the Holy Land and spent several months per year in Jerusalem, from where she wrote columns for the Catholic Herald. She enrolled into the School of African and Oriental Studies, first to do a Master of Arts degree and then a doctorate researching marriage law in Israel. Divorce in Israel is regulated exclusively by religious authorities, and she uncovered how Christian women who belong to restrictive churches convert in order to obtain a divorce. She simultaneously promoted native gardening at Gethsemane, and employed the principle in designing a garden near the Pool of Bethesda.

Robertson died of cancer on 22 April 2018 in Oxford, England, surrounded by friends who were helping her submit her thesis. She had decided to have no funeral because "funerals are a bore" and to instead donate her body to science.
