= Angus Douglas-Hamilton, 15th Duke of Hamilton =

British noble (1938–2010)

His Grace The Duke of Hamilton and Brandon
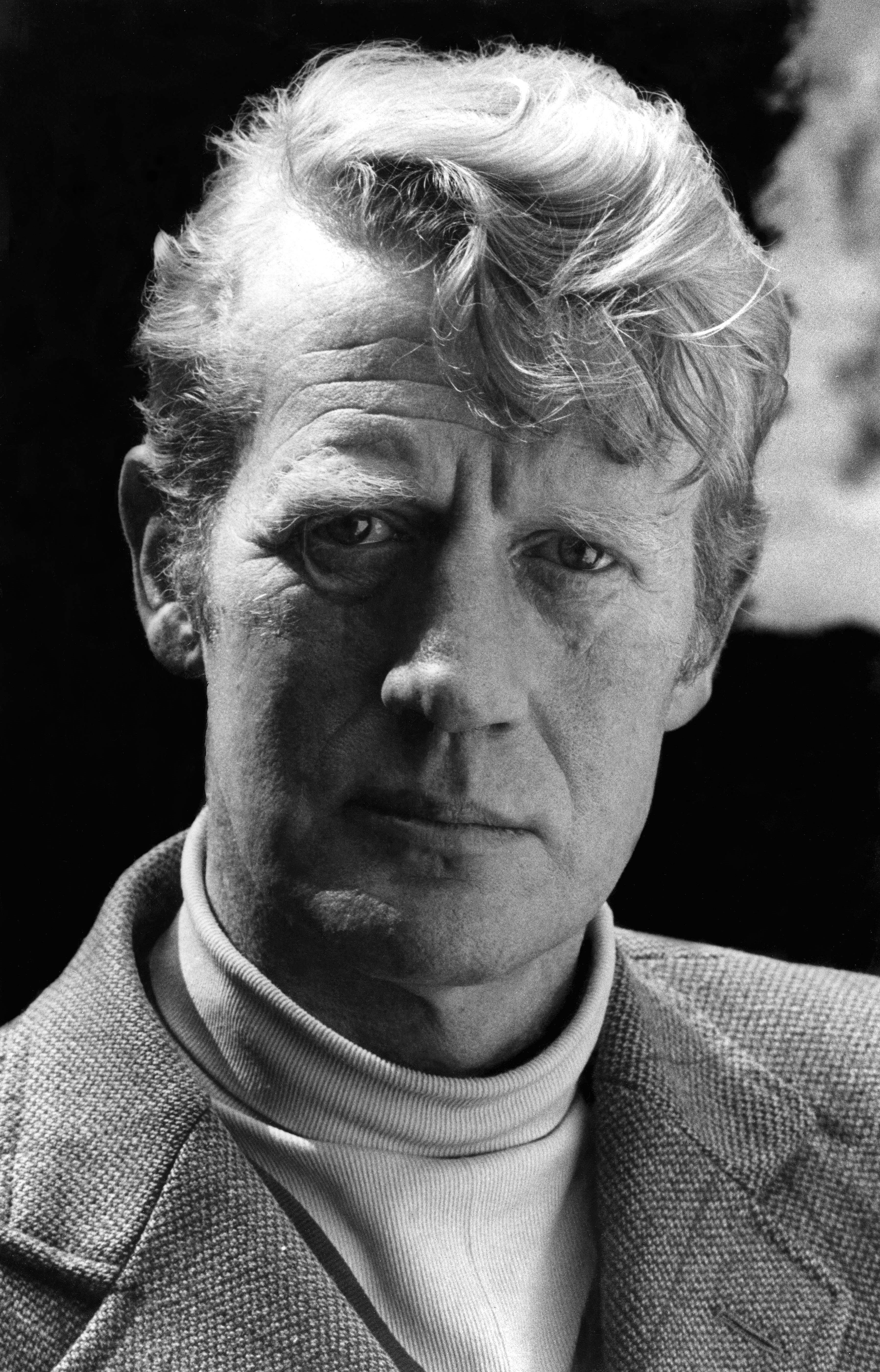
- Portrait by Allan Warren, 1987
- Tenure: 30 March 1973 – 5 June 2010
- Predecessor: Douglas Douglas-Hamilton, 14th Duke of Hamilton
- Successor: Alexander Douglas-Hamilton, 16th Duke of Hamilton
- Born: 13 September 1938
- Died: 5 June 2010 (aged 71); Dirleton, Scotland
- Spouses: Sarah Jane Scott (m. 1972; div. 1987) Jillian Robertson (m. 1988; div. 1995) Kay Carmichael (m. 1998)
- Issue: Lady Eleanor Douglas-Hamilton; Lady Ann Douglas-Hamilton; Alexander Douglas-Hamilton, 16th Duke of Hamilton; Lord John William Douglas-Hamilton
- Parents: Douglas Douglas-Hamilton, 14th Duke of Hamilton; Lady Elizabeth Ivy Percy

Angus Alan Douglas Douglas-Hamilton, 15th Duke of Hamilton and 12th Duke of Brandon KStJ (13 September 1938 – 5 June 2010), styled Earl of Angus until 1940 and Marquess of Douglas and Clydesdale between 1940 and 1973, was the premier peer of Scotland.

== Career ==
The son of the 14th Duke of Hamilton and Lady Elizabeth Percy, daughter of the 8th Duke of Northumberland, he was educated at Eton College and Balliol College, Oxford (as was his father before him). One of his younger brothers was the Scottish Conservative and Unionist politician James Douglas-Hamilton, Baron Selkirk of Douglas.

At the coronation of Queen Elizabeth II he was a page in Westminster Abbey and was awarded the 1952 Coronation Medal. He was Hereditary Keeper of the Palace of Holyroodhouse. By right of his subsidiary title of Lord Abernethy, he was hereditary bearer of the Crown of Scotland to the Parliament of Scotland. He fulfilled that duty by carrying the Crown in front of Queen Elizabeth II at the opening ceremony of the Scottish Parliament.

He was a campaigner for animal welfare, together with his third wife, Kay Carmichael. A motorsport enthusiast, he held a number of UK and international land speed records. Many were gained on beaches and airstrips after he was banned from driving on public roads following his fifth drink-driving conviction in 1993. The duke suffered from alcohol addiction for many years.

=== Royal Air Force ===
He was a pilot in the UK Royal Air Force under the name of Angus Clydesdale.

He flew Canberra aircraft in the far east from Singapore during the UK confrontation with Indonesia in the 1960s.

He then became a flying instructor on the Jet Provost, following the instructor course at RAF Little Rissington.

He was then posted to train student pilots at RAF Syerston north of Nottingham. Not then being married, Angus lived in the Officers Mess and was a major figure in the social life of the RAF Station.

He was posted suddenly to RAF Prestwick, for family reasons associated with his aristocratic background.

Later he retired from the Air Force and reverted to his duties as a Scottish aristocrat. He also did some flying with the local aviation company including testing variants of small piston-powered aircraft.

== Marriages and children ==
The 15th Duke married three times:

He married firstly Sarah Jane Scott, daughter of Major Sir Walter Scott, 4th Bt, of Beauclerc, on 23 June 1972 (divorced 1987). They had four children and five grand children:

- Lady Eleanor Douglas-Hamilton (born 10 August 1973)
- Lady Ann Douglas-Hamilton (born 14 May 1976)
- Alexander Douglas-Hamilton, 16th Duke of Hamilton (born 31 March 1978)
- Lord John William Douglas-Hamilton (born 2 October 1979)

He married secondly Jillian Robertson in 1988 (divorced 1995). No issue. She was previously married to Martin Page and Edward A. S. Hulton and died in 2018.

He married thirdly Kay Carmichael, now the Dowager Duchess of Hamilton, in 1998. No issue. A qualified nurse, she serves as Patron of Scottish Staffordshire Bull Terrier Rescue.

The 15th Duke died on 5 June 2010 at the age of 71.

Peerage of Scotland
Preceded by Douglas Douglas-Hamilton	Duke of Hamilton; 1973–2010	Succeeded by Alexander Douglas-Hamilton
Peerage of Great Britain
Preceded by Douglas Douglas-Hamilton	Duke of Brandon; 1973–2010	Succeeded by Alexander Douglas-Hamilton
