= Abraham Cooper =

British painter (1787–1868)

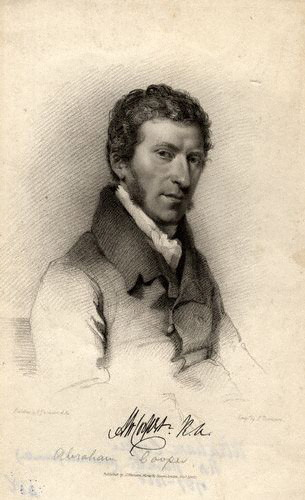
Abraham Cooper, c. 1827.

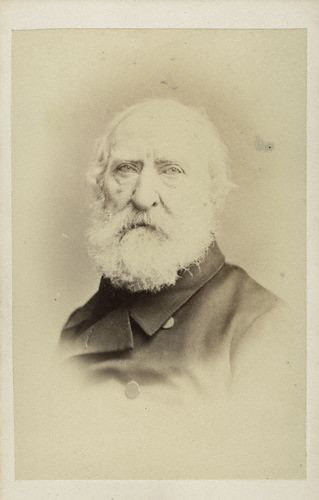
Carte de visite of Abraham Cooper, 1860s.

Abraham Cooper RA (1787–1868) was a British animal and battle painter.

== Life ==
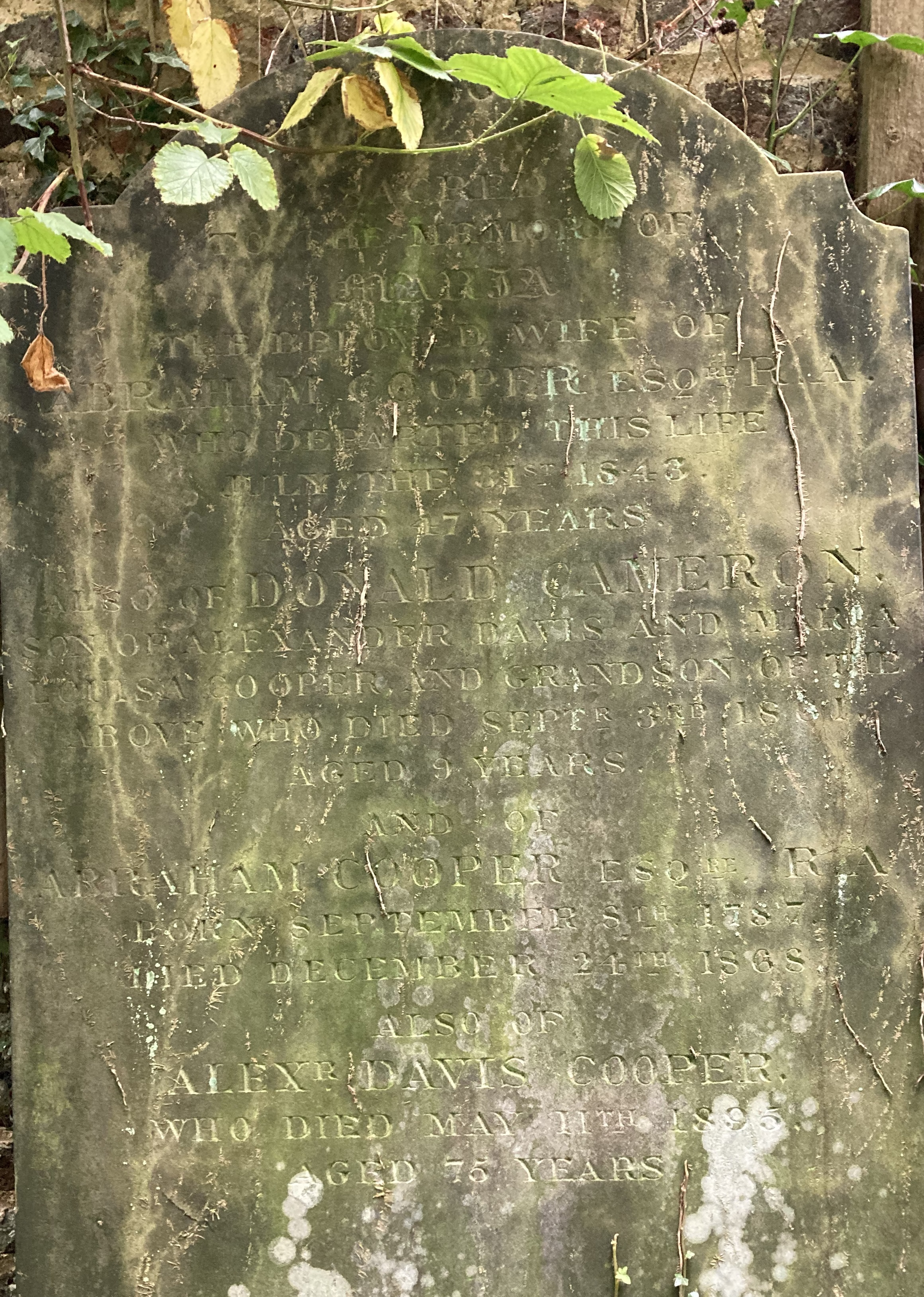
Family grave of Abraham Cooper in Highgate Cemetery

The son of a tobacconist, he was born in Greenwich, London on 8 September 1787. At the age of thirteen he became an employee at Astley's Amphitheatre, and was afterwards a groom in the service of Henry Meux, a brewer and later the first of the Meux baronets. When he was twenty-two, wishing to possess a portrait of a favorite horse under his care, he bought a manual of painting, learned something of the use of oil-colours, and painted the picture on a canvas hung against the stable wall. His master bought it and encouraged him to continue in his efforts. He accordingly began to copy prints of horses, and was introduced to Benjamin Marshall, the animal painter, who took him into his studio, and seems to have introduced him to the Sporting Magazine, an illustrated periodical to which he was himself a contributor.

In 1814 he exhibited his Tam O'Shanter, and in 1816 he won a prize for his Battle of Ligny. In 1817 he exhibited his Battle of Marston Moor and was made associate of the Royal Academy, and in 1820 he was elected Academician. Cooper, although ill-educated, was a clever and conscientious artist; his colouring was somewhat flat and dead, but he was a master of equine portraiture and anatomy, and had some antiquarian knowledge. He had a special fondness for Cavalier and Roundhead pictures.

He died on 24 December 1868 and is buried at the top of the western side of Highgate Cemetery (plot no.830), against the north wall.

== Paintings ==
- Bosworth Field (1825; Dallas Museum of Art, Dallas, Texas)
- The Death of Sir Francis Russell, who was treacherously slain at a Border Meeting, July 16, 1585 (1827; Duke of Bedford, Woburn Abbey)
- Battle of Zutphen, 1586 (1826; Duke of Bedford, Woburn Abbey)
- The Battle of Marston Moor (1819; Harris Museum and Art Gallery, Preston)
- The Heroic Conduct of Cromwell at Marston Moor (1821; Chequers House, Buckinghamshire)
- Cromwell leading his Cavalry into Battle (Cambridgeshire Museums, at Cromwell House, Huntingdon)
- Battle Scene (attr.) (Guildhall Art Gallery, London)
- Wellington's First Great Victory – The Battle of Assaye (The Light Dragoons)
- The Battle of Ligny (Lord Egremont, Petworth House)

== Gallery ==
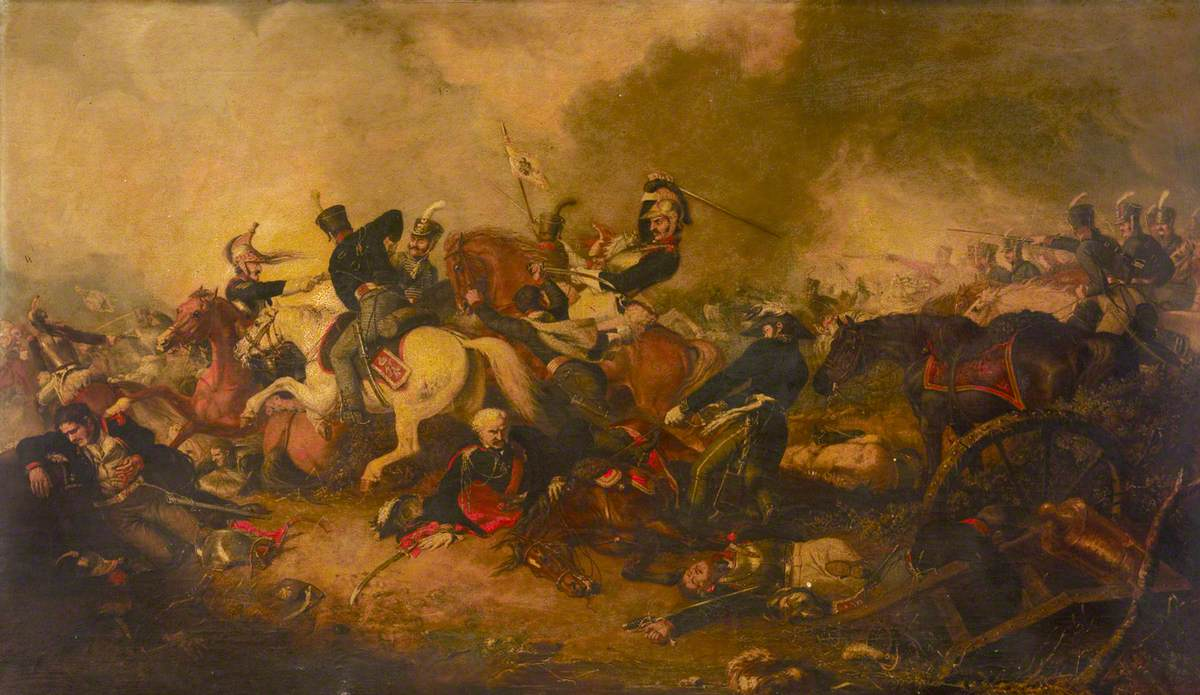
Marshal Blucher at the Battle of Ligny, 1815

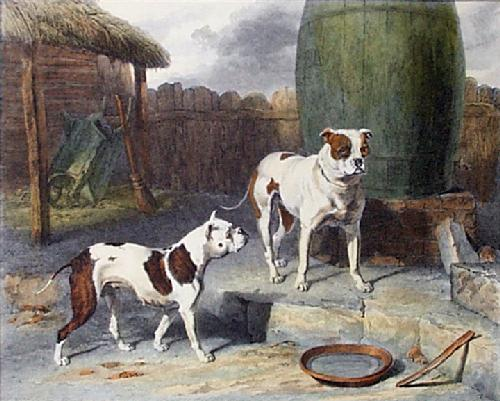
Crib and Rosa, 1817

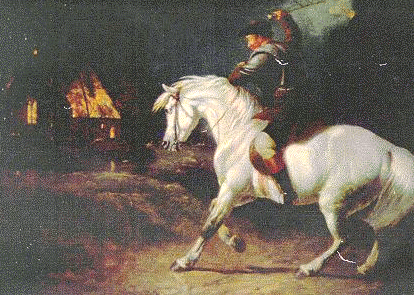
Tam O'Shanter

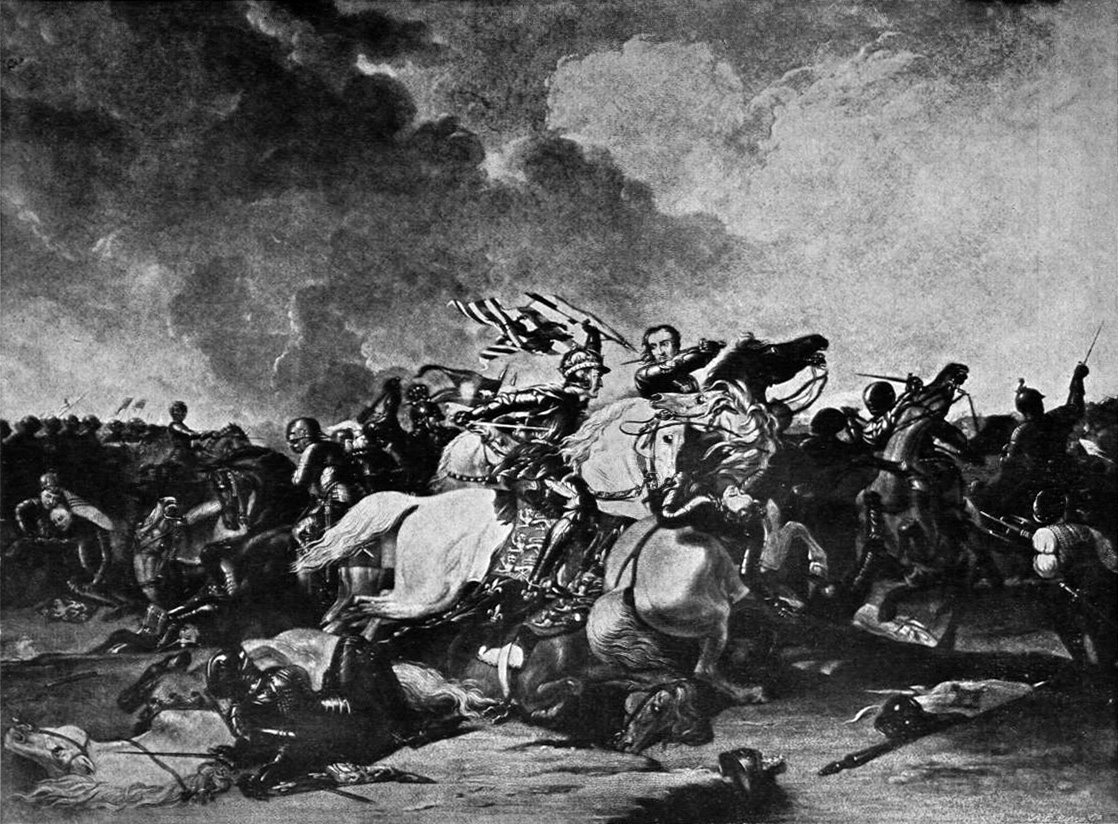
Richard III and the Earl of Richmond During the Battle of Bosworth Field

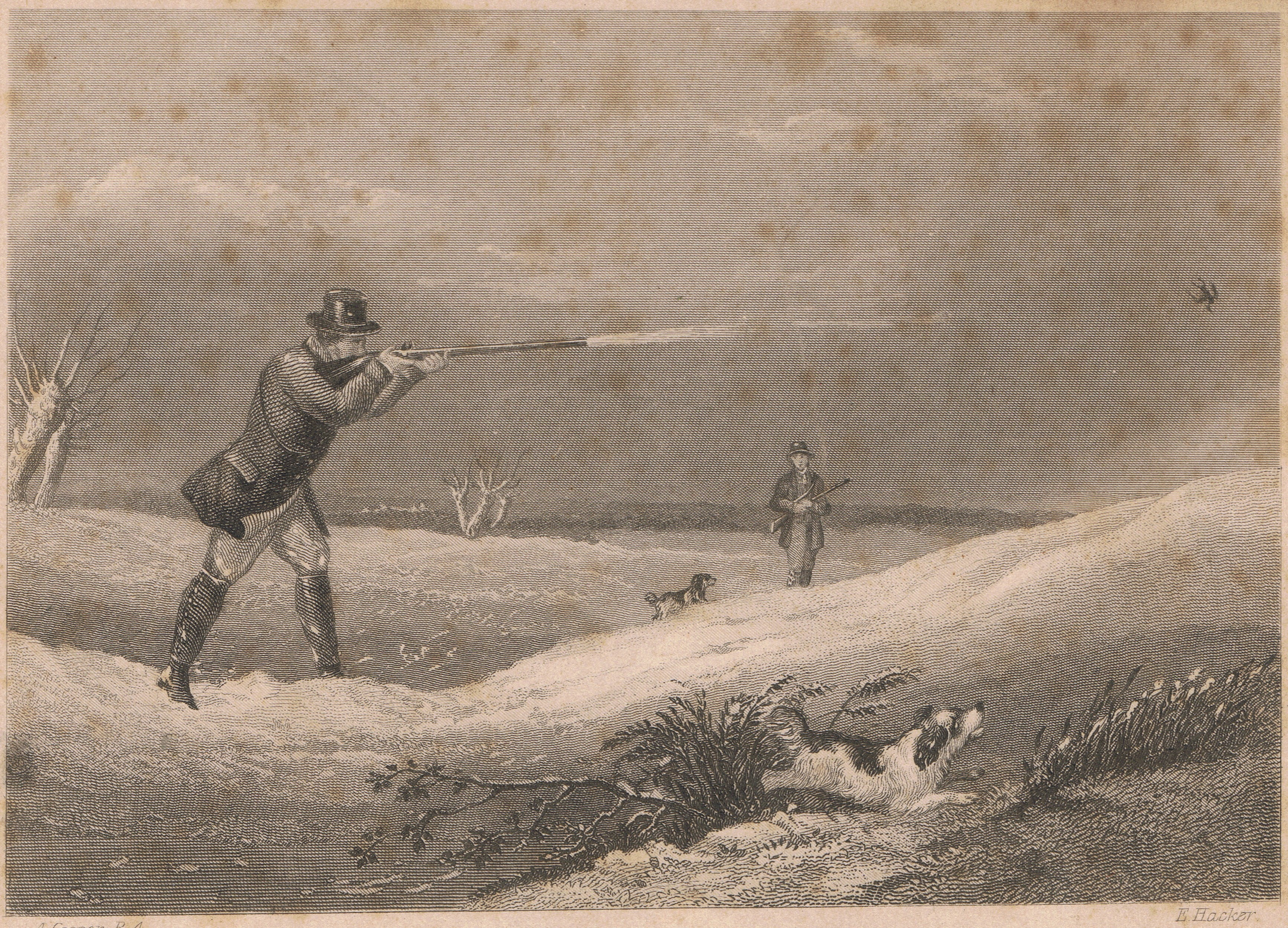
Engraving after Cooper, by Edward Hacker (1813–1905), 1866.

== Works about ==
- Harrington, Peter (1993). British Artists and War: The Face of Battle in Paintings and Prints, 1700–1914. London: Greenhill. ISBN 1853671576
