= Marshal Blucher at the Battle of Ligny =

Painting by Abraham Cooper

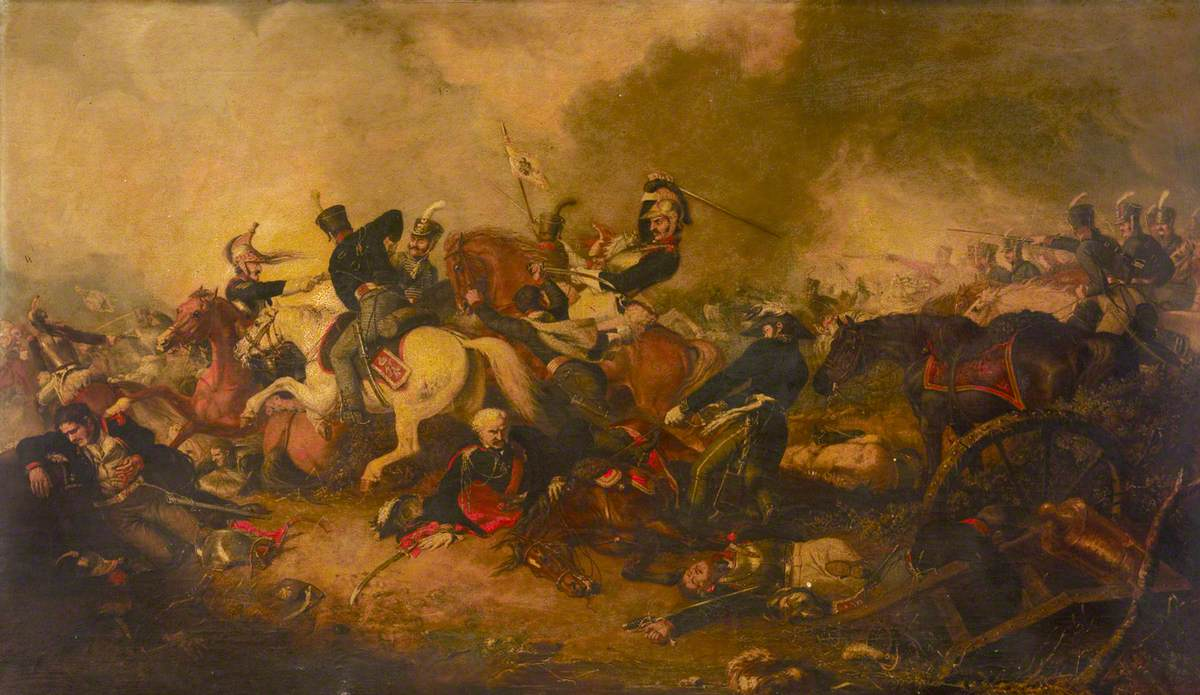
- Artist: Abraham Cooper
- Year: 1815
- Type: Oil on canvas, history painting
- Dimensions: 67.3 cm × 167.6 cm (26.5 in × 66.0 in)
- Location: Petworth House; Sussex

Marshal Blucher at the Battle of Ligny is an 1815 history painting by the British artist Abraham Cooper. It depicts the Battle of Ligny during the Hundred Days campaign on 16 June 1815 where the French Emperor Napoleon defeated Prussian forces under Gebhard Leberecht von Blücher. Fought two days before the Battle of Waterloo Blücher was able to recover from the hard-fought battle to march to support the Duke of Wellington for an allied victory. It dramatises the moment in which the veteran Blücher was trapped under his horse, shot dead by the enemy, and was nearly trampled under the hooves of enemy cavalry.

The painting was the result of a competition held by the British Institution to celebrate the recent campaign. While most of the established painters chose to feature on Wellington and Waterloo, Cooper and Philip Francis Stephanoff selected Ligny as their subject.

The work was displayed at the annual British Institution exhibition in Pall Mall in 1816. The painting was bought by the noted art collector Earl of Egremont and remains on display at his former residence of Petworth House in Sussex.

== Bibliography ==
- Hichberger J.W.M. Images of the Army: The Military in British Art, 1815-1914. Manchester University Press, 2017.
- Reynolds, Luke. Who Owned Waterloo?: Battle, Memory, and Myth in British History, 1815–1852. Oxford University Press, 2022.
