= Crib and Rosa =

1817 painting by Samuel Raven

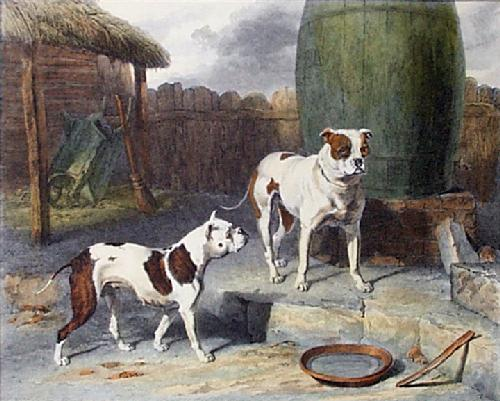
Crib and Rosa

Crib and Rosa is an 1817 painting by Abraham Cooper. This painting provides an image of the extinct Old English Bulldog dog breed.

The painting depicts Crib and Rosa, two Old English Bulldogs. Rosa was considered to represent correct formation for bulldogs at that time. Through John Scott's engraving, this painting became the best-known, and most reproduced, painting of dogs from that period.

The image was frequently referred to by exhibitors as an ideal form of the breed. Writing at the end of the nineteenth century, Dalziel says any deficiencies in the otherwise perfect outline of Rosa was due to her sex; lacking desired characteristics of wrinkles and bone structure.
