= Alexander Douglas-Hamilton, 16th Duke of Hamilton =

Scottish nobleman and the Premier Peer of Scotland

His Grace The Duke of Hamilton
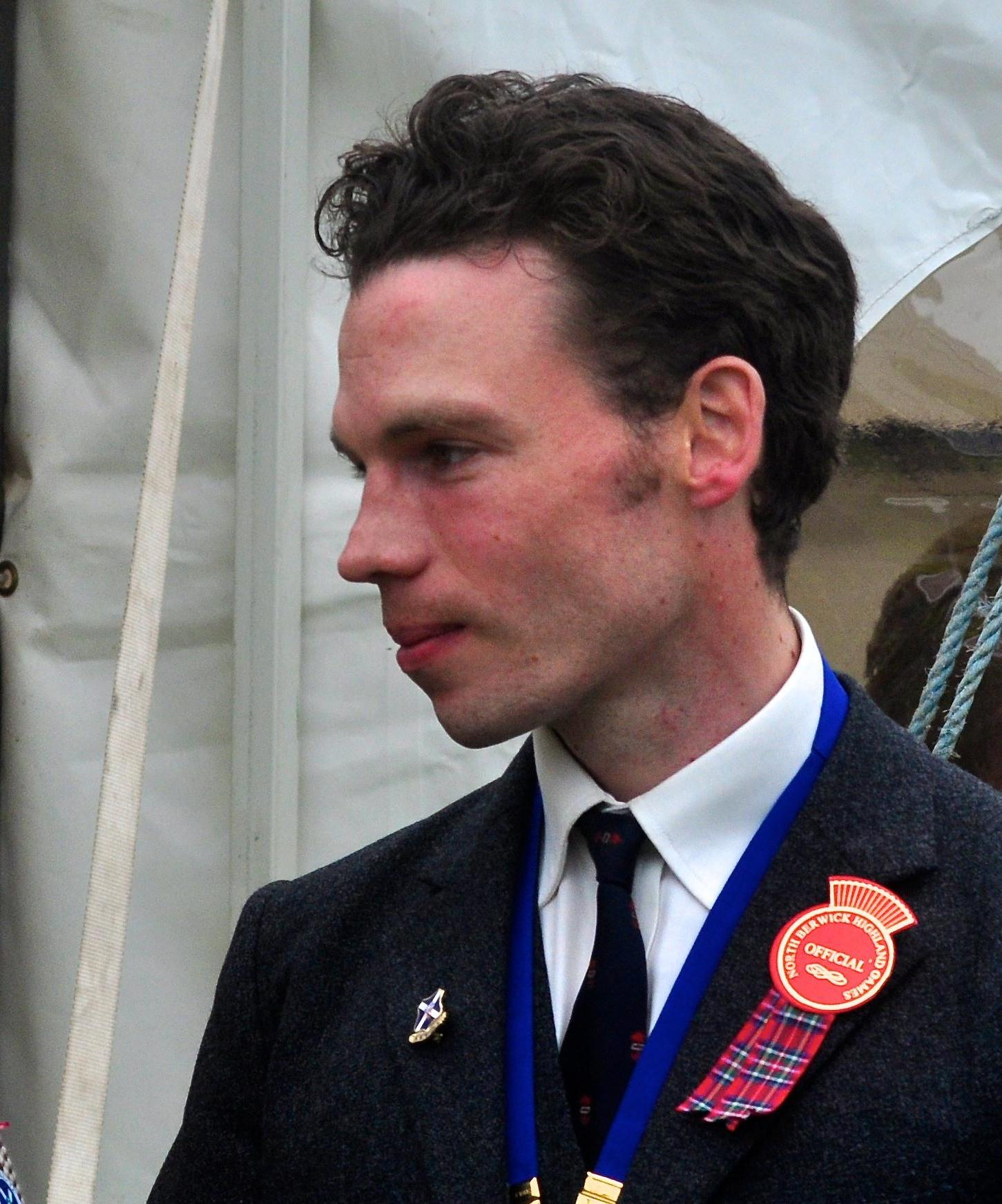
- Hamilton in 2012

Duke of Hamilton
- Tenure: 5 June 2010 – present
- Predecessor: Angus Douglas-Hamilton
- Born: Alexander Douglas Douglas-Hamilton; 31 March 1978 (age 48); Edinburgh, Scotland
- Noble family: Douglas-Hamilton
- Spouse: Sophie Rutherford (m. 2011)
- Issue: 3
- Father: Angus Douglas-Hamilton, 15th Duke of Hamilton
- Mother: Sarah Jane Scott

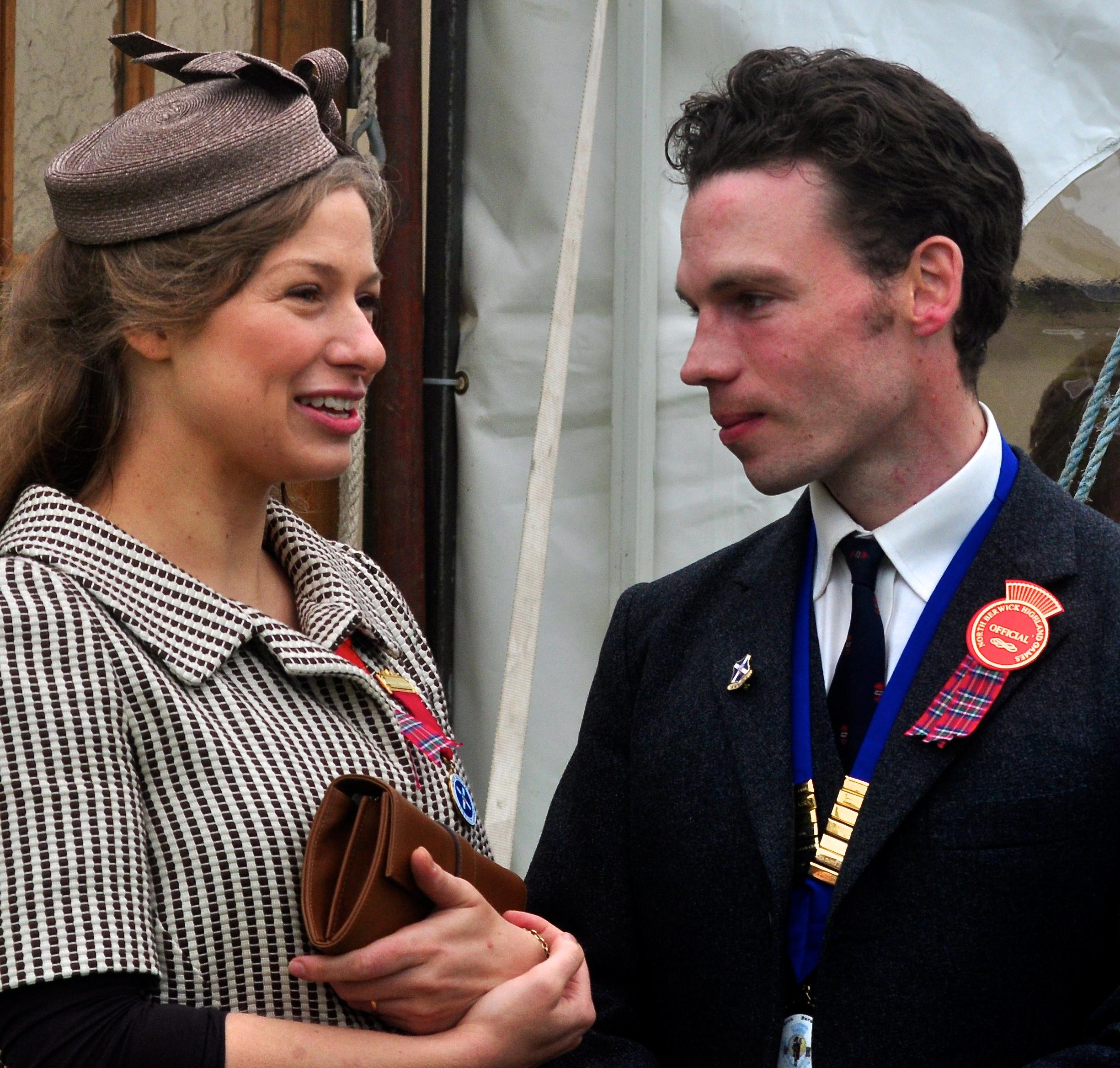
Alexander Douglas-Hamilton, 16th Duke of Hamilton, and his wife Sophie, Duchess of Hamilton (2012)

Alexander Douglas Douglas-Hamilton, 16th Duke of Hamilton, 13th Duke of Brandon (born 31 March 1978), styled Marquess of Douglas and Clydesdale until 2010, is a Scottish nobleman and the premier peer of Scotland.

== Early life ==
Douglas-Hamilton was born in Edinburgh, the son of Angus Douglas-Hamilton, 15th Duke of Hamilton, and his first wife, Sarah Scott, and was educated at Keil School, Dumbarton, and Gordonstoun in Scotland.

== Inheritance ==
Upon the death of his father on 5 June 2010, he became the 16th Duke of Hamilton in the Peerage of Scotland and 13th Duke of Brandon in the Peerage of Great Britain. He also inherited other Scottish peerages and titles, Marquess of Douglas, Marquess of Clydesdale, Earl of Angus, Earl of Lanark, Earl of Arran and Cambridge, Lord Abernethy and Jedburgh Forest, Lord Machanshyre and Polmont and Lord Aven and Innerdale, and the Barony of Dutton in the peerage of Great Britain.

The Duke is the Hereditary Keeper of the Palace of Holyroodhouse and the Hereditary Bearer of the Crown of Scotland. In this role, he walks immediately before the monarch in the ancient ceremonial procession known as the Riding of Parliament. As Hereditary Bearer of the Crown of Scotland, he also placed the crown upon the coffin of Queen Elizabeth II during a service of remembrance in St Giles' Cathedral on 12 September 2022.

The seat of the Dukes of Hamilton is Lennoxlove House to the east of Edinburgh, replacing the now-demolished Hamilton Palace to the south of Glasgow.

The Duke was appointed Honorary Air Commodore in No. 603 (City of Edinburgh) Squadron, Royal Auxiliary Air Force, for a three-year term from 4 April 2025 until 4 April 2028.

== Marriage and children ==
On 7 May 2011, he married Sophie Ann Rutherford (born 8 December 1976) in Edinburgh. The couple have three sons.

Peerage of Scotland
Preceded by Angus Douglas-Hamilton	Duke of Hamilton; 2010–present	Incumbent
Peerage of Great Britain
Preceded by Angus Douglas-Hamilton	Duke of Brandon; 2010–present	Incumbent
Orders of precedence in the United Kingdom
Preceded by The Duke of Rutland	Gentlemen; The Duke of Hamilton	Succeeded by The Duke of Buccleuch
