= Duke of Hamilton =

Title in the Peerage of Scotland

Dukedom of Hamilton held with Dukedom of Brandon
- Quarterly, first and fourth grandquarters counterquartered, first and fourth gules, three cinquefoils ermine (for Hamilton); second and third argent, a lymphad with sails furled proper, flagged gules (for Arran); second and third grandquarters argent, a heart gules imperially crowned proper, on a chief azure three stars of the field (for Douglas).
- Creation date: 12 April 1643
- Created by: Charles I
- Peerage: Peerage of Scotland
- First holder: James Hamilton, 3rd Marquess of Hamilton
- Present holder: Alexander Douglas-Hamilton, 16th Duke
- Heir apparent: Douglas Charles Douglas-Hamilton, Marquess of Douglas and Clydesdale
- Remainder to: heirs male of the body of the grantee; the grantee's brother; heirs male of the body of the grantee's brother; the grantee's eldest daughter, followed by her heirs male; nearest heirs whatsoever of the grantee
- Subsidiary titles: Marquess of Douglas; Marquess of Clydesdale; Earl of Angus; Earl of Lanark; Earl of Arran and Cambridge; Lord Abernethy and Jedburgh Forest; Lord Machanshire and Polmont; Lord Aven and Innerdale; Baron Dutton
- Status: Extant
- Seat: Lennoxlove House
- Former seats: Hamilton Palace; Brodick Castle; Dungavel House; Kinneil House; Ashton Hall; Ferne House; Cadzow Castle

Duke of Hamilton is a title in the Peerage of Scotland, created in April 1643. It is the senior dukedom in that peerage (except for the Dukedom of Rothesay held by the sovereign's eldest son), and as such its holder is the premier peer of Scotland, as well as being head of the House of Hamilton. The title, the town of Hamilton in Lanarkshire, and many places around the world are named after members of the Hamilton family. The ducal family's surname, originally "Hamilton", is now "Douglas-Hamilton". Since 1711, the dukedom has been held together with the Dukedom of Brandon in the Peerage of Great Britain, and the dukes since that time have been styled Duke of Hamilton and Brandon, along with several other subsidiary titles.

== Titles and offices ==
The titles held by the current duke of Hamilton and Brandon are:

=== Peerage of Scotland ===
- 16th Duke of Hamilton (created 1643)
- 13th Marquess of Douglas (created 1633)
- 16th Marquess of Clydesdale (created 1643)
- 23rd Earl of Angus (created 1389)
- 13th Earl of Angus (created 1633)
- 15th Earl of Lanark (created 1639)
- 16th Earl of Arran and Cambridge (created 1643)
- 13th Lord Abernethy and Jedburgh Forest (created 1633)
- 15th Lord Machanshyre and Polmont (created 1639)
- 16th Lord Aven and Innerdale (created 1643)

=== Peerage of Great Britain ===
- 13th Duke of Brandon, in the County of Suffolk (created 1711)
- 13th Baron Dutton, in the County of Chester (created 1711)

=== Other offices and duties ===
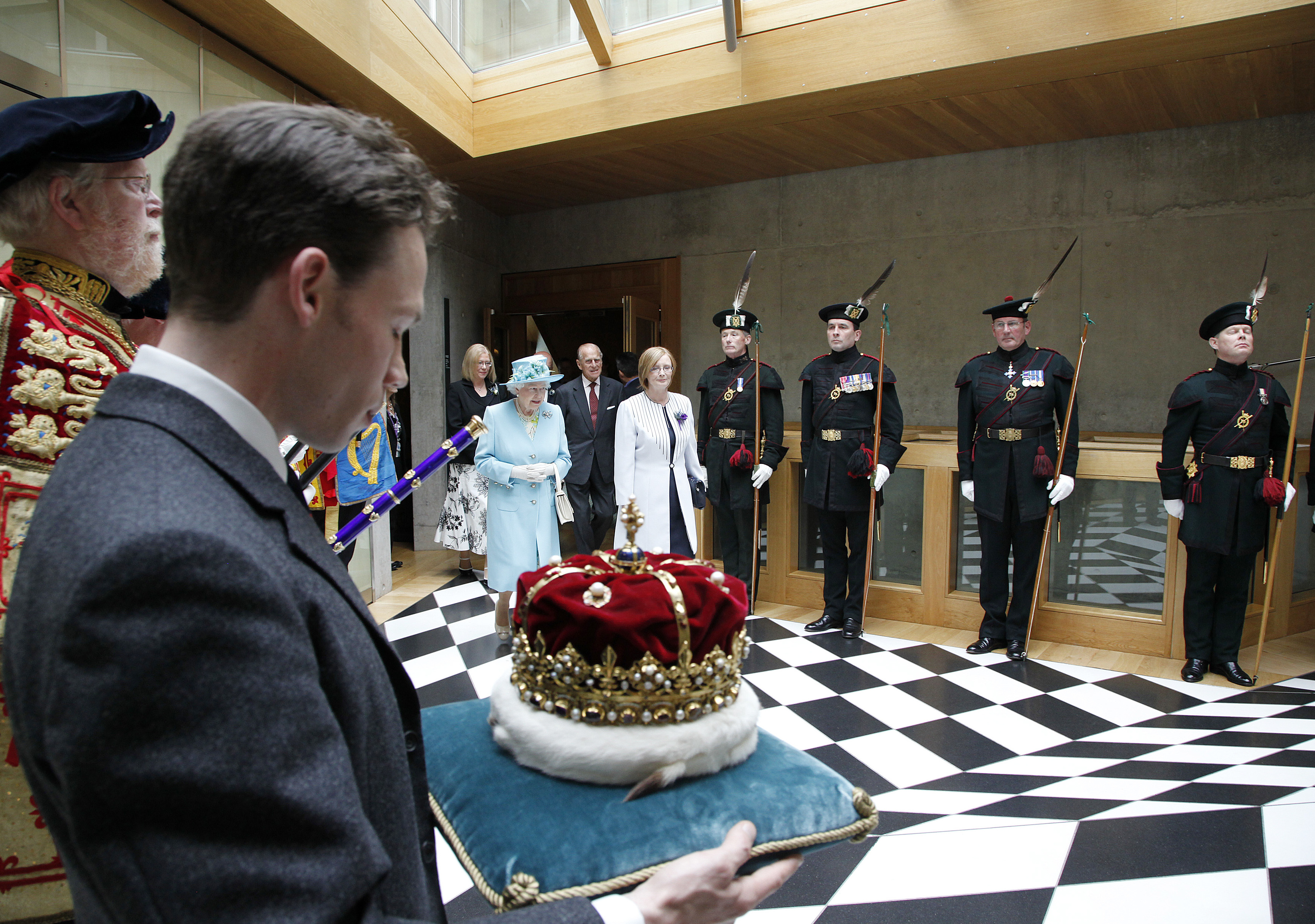
Alexander Douglas-Hamilton, 16th Duke of Hamilton, acting as Hereditary Bearer of the Crown of Scotland, holding the crown at the Scottish Parliament before Queen Elizabeth II and Presiding Officer Tricia Marwick in July 2011

The duke of Hamilton and Brandon is the hereditary keeper of the Palace of Holyroodhouse, the official royal residence in Scotland, where he maintains large private quarters. He is also, as Lord Abernethy and in this respect successor to the Gaelic earls of Fife, the hereditary bearer of the Crown of Scotland, a role performed by the 15th duke at the inauguration of the Scottish Parliament in 1999 and the 16th duke at the State Opening of Parliament, 30 June 2011. As Hereditary Bearer of the Crown of Scotland, the 16th Duke also placed the crown upon the coffin of Queen Elizabeth II during a service of remembrance in St Giles' Cathedral on 12 September 2022. Traditionally, the duke of Hamilton enjoys the exclusive right to remove the Scottish Crown Jewels from the City of Edinburgh. He also regularly attends sittings in the Court of Lord Lyon as a hereditary assessor, sitting on the bench beside Lord Lyon.

=== Courtesy titles ===
The courtesy titles used by heirs apparent are "Marquess of Douglas and Clydesdale" (the eldest son of the duke) and "Earl of Angus" (the eldest son of a marquess of Douglas and Clydesdale). No duke has had a great-grandson in direct line to the titles, but it is likely that the latter would be styled "Lord Abernethy" (the Lordship of Abernethy and Jedburgh Forest being the most senior available title).

Before the dukes succeeded to the Marquessate of Douglas and its subsidiary titles, the heirs apparent were styled initially "Earl of Arran" (which had previously been used as a courtesy title by the marquesses of Hamilton) and later "Marquess of Clydesdale" (the former style then being adopted for a grandson in direct line). The heir apparent to the Earldom of Lanark (before that title merged with the dukedom) was styled "Lord Polmont".

=== Multiple dukedoms ===
The duke of Hamilton and Brandon is one of only five British peers to hold more than one dukedom, the others being:

- the Prince of Wales (who is Duke of Cornwall, Duke of Rothesay, and Duke of Cambridge);
- the Duke of Buccleuch and Queensberry;
- the Duke of Argyll (who holds two Dukedoms of Argyll); and
- the Duke of Richmond, Lennox and Gordon

Historically, several other peers have held multiple dukedoms, including the Duke of Newcastle upon Tyne and Newcastle-under-Lyne, the Duke of Argyll and Greenwich, the Duke of Monmouth and Buccleuch and the two Dukes of Queensberry and Dover and some other mainly royal dukes.

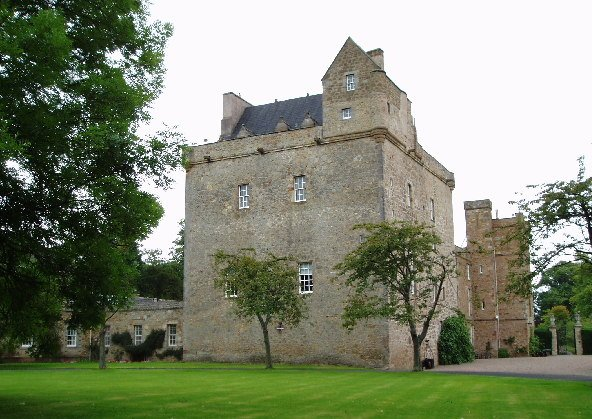
Lennoxlove House, a current seat of the dukes of Hamilton

== House of Hamilton ==
=== Lairds of Cadzow ===
Gilbert de Hameldun is recorded as witnessing a charter confirming the gift of the church at Cragyn to the Abbey of Paisley in 1271. His ancestry is uncertain but he may have been the son of William de Hamilton (third son of Robert de Beaumont, 3rd Earl of Leicester) and Mary of Strathearn. Gilbert de Hameldun married Isabella Randolph, daughter of Thomas Randolph of Strathdon, Chamberlain of Scotland. His heir was Walter fitz Gilbert. He was governor of Bothwell Castle for the English Crown during the First War of Scottish Independence. Following the Battle of Bannockburn in 1314, he gave refuge to the Earl of Hertford and other escapees, only to deliver them and Bothwell up to Edward Bruce. He then became a Bruce partisan. Sometime between 1315 and 1329, Robert the Bruce knighted him and granted him lands in Renfrewshire and the Lothians and Cadzow (present day Hamilton in Lanarkshire), including Cadzow Castle. The lands had previously belonged to John Comyn, who was murdered by Robert the Bruce.

Undifferenced arms of the chief of Hamilton until 1503

The 1st laird of Cadzow was succeeded as the 2nd laird by his son Sir David fitz Walter. He was a supporter of King David II and fought at the Battle of Neville's Cross (Battle of Durham) where he was captured along with the King. His son David Hamilton, the 3rd laird, was the first to establish Hamilton as the family name. David Hamilton's son Sir John Hamilton became the 4th laird and was, in turn, succeeded as the 5th laird by his son James Hamilton.

=== Lords Hamilton and Earls of Arran ===
The 5th laird was succeeded as 6th laird by his son, Sir James Hamilton, who was created a Lord of Parliament as Lord Hamilton on 3 July 1445. In early 1474, he married Mary Stewart, Countess of Arran, daughter of King James II and widow of Thomas Boyd, 1st Earl of Arran. He was succeeded by his only legitimate son, James, 2nd Lord Hamilton. In 1490, then aged 15, he married the 13-year-old Elizabeth, Lady Hay, daughter of Alexander Home, 2nd Lord Home and widow of Sir Thomas Hay, Master of Yester, son and heir of John Hay, 1st Lord Hay of Yester. However, it was later discovered that Sir Thomas Hay was still alive and the marriage was annulled. The 2nd Lord married secondly Janet, Lady Livingstone, daughter of Sir David Beaton of Creich and widow of Sir Robert Livingstone of Easter Wemyss and Drumry. He became a Privy Counsellor to King James IV, and helped to arrange his marriage to Margaret, daughter of King Henry VII of England. As a reward, he was created Earl of Arran on 8 August 1503. He was succeeded by his elder son from his second marriage, James, 2nd Earl of Arran. He was Regent of Scotland between 1542 and 1554, and guardian of the young Mary, Queen of Scots. He was created Duc de Châtellerault in the Peerage of France in 1548 for his part in arranging the marriage of Queen Mary to Francis, Dauphin of France. This French Dukedom was forfeited when he switched allegiances in 1559. Emperor Napoleon III "confirmed" this title for the 12th Duke of Hamilton in the 19th century, but although the 12th Duke was heir male of the 2nd Earl, the legal effect of this "confirmation" is doubtful.

The undifferenced arms of the Chief of the Hamiltons from 1503 onwards

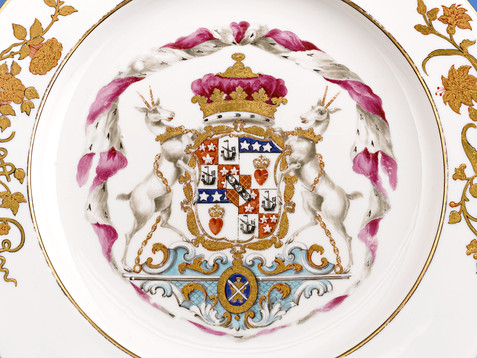
Coat of arms on a Derby Porcelain dinner service commissioned by the 8th Duke of Hamilton, circa 1780–90

The 2nd Earl was succeeded by his eldest son, James, 3rd Earl of Arran, who had been proposed as a husband to Queen Elizabeth I of England in 1561. In 1562 he was declared insane, and in 1581 he resigned the Earldom to James Stewart of Bothwellhaugh. However, in 1586 his resignation was ruled by the Court of Session to be the act of a madman and his honours were restored.

=== Marquesses and Dukes of Hamilton ===
The 3rd Earl's younger brother John Hamilton (who was styled Lord Hamilton as is traditional for the younger sons of Earls) was appointed to administer his brother's estates. He was created Marquess of Hamilton, Earl of Arran and Lord Aven on 17 April 1599. His son, James, 2nd Marquess of Hamilton (who had been created Lord Aberbrothwick (or Arbroath) on 5 May 1608, before he succeeded) moved to England with King James VI, and invested into the Somers Isles Company, an offshoot of the Virginia Company, buying the shares of Lucy Russell, Countess of Bedford. The Parish of Hamilton in the Somers Isles (now Bermuda) is named for him. Upon the death of his uncle in 1609 he succeeded as 4th Earl of Arran (of the 1503 creation) and 5th Lord Hamilton. He was also created Earl of Cambridge and Baron Innerdale in the Peerage of England on 16 June 1619.

His son, James, 3rd Marquess of Hamilton, was created Duke of Hamilton, Marquess of Clydesdale, Earl of Arran and Cambridge and Lord Aven and Innerdale on 12 April 1643, with a special remainder allowing succession through the female line should his and his brother's heirs male fail. His son, Charles, Earl of Arran, died young and the 1st Duke's titles passed to his younger brother, William, 2nd Duke of Hamilton, who had already been created Earl of Lanark and Lord Machanshire and Polmont on 31 March 1639. A surrender and regrant in 1650 allowed these also to be inherited by the 1st Duke's elder daughter. Upon his death in 1651, with no further heirs in the immediate male line, the Dukedom (and the titles created with it), as well as the Earldom of Lanark (and the title created with it), passed to that daughter, Anne, 3rd Duchess of Hamilton. The 1503 Earldom of Arran and the Lordship of Hamilton became dormant, and all the other titles (the Marquessate of Hamilton, the 1599 Earldom of Arran and the Lordships of Hamilton, Aven and Aberbrothwick in the Peerage of Scotland, and the Earldom of Cambridge and the Barony of Innerdale in the Peerage of England) became extinct.

In 1656, the 3rd Duchess married William Douglas, 1st Earl of Selkirk, third son of William Douglas, 1st Marquess of Douglas. He had been created Earl of Selkirk and Lord Daer and Shortcleuch on 4 August 1646. He changed his surname to "Hamilton", and on 20 September 1660 was created Duke of Hamilton, Marquess of Clydesdale, Earl of Arran, Lanark and Selkirk and Lord Aven, Machanshire, Polmont and Daer for life. In 1688, he resigned the Earldom of Selkirk and the Lordship of Daer and Shortcleuch, and those titles were regranted to his second son, with a special remainder designed to prevent them becoming merged with the Dukedom. (See Earl of Selkirk for the subsequent history of those titles, which were eventually inherited by the 12th Duke of Hamilton, becoming separated again from the Dukedom on the death of the 13th Duke in 1940).

On 9 July 1698, the 3rd Duchess resigned all her titles in favour of her eldest son, James, Earl of Arran, who thereby succeeded as 4th Duke in his mother's lifetime (his father had died in 1694). During the lead-up to the Acts of Union 1707, the 4th Duke was the leader of the anti-union party. He was created Duke of Brandon, in the County of Suffolk, and Baron Dutton, in the County of Chester, in the Peerage of Great Britain on 10 September 1711, but was wrongfully refused a summons to the Parliament of Great Britain under that title (although he continued to sit as a Scottish representative peer). He was killed in a celebrated duel with Charles Mohun, 4th Baron Mohun (who also died) in Hyde Park in London on 15 November 1712.

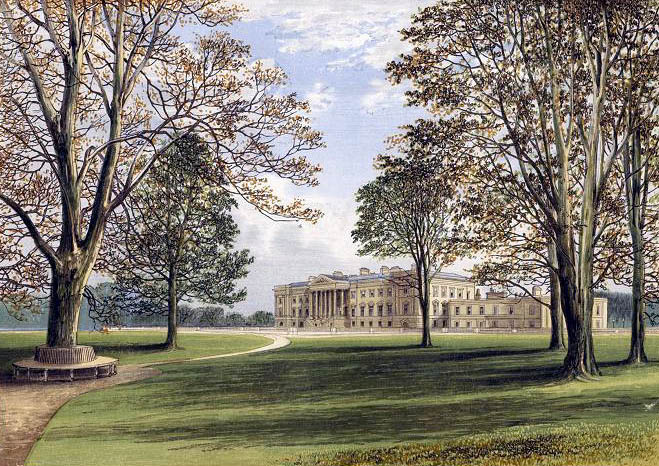
Hamilton Palace, the former family seat in Hamilton, circa 1880.

The 4th Duke's son James, 5th Duke of Hamilton was succeeded by his son James, 6th Duke of Hamilton, and he by his son James, 7th Duke of Hamilton. In 1761, the 7th Duke's second cousin twice removed, Archibald Douglas, 1st Duke of Douglas, died without an heir. As the Duke of Hamilton, though still using the surname "Hamilton", was patrilineally a "Douglas" (through the 3rd Duchess's husband), the 7th Duke became heir male of the House of Douglas and inherited the Duke of Douglas's subsidiary titles (although not the Dukedom), succeeding as 4th Marquess of Douglas, 14th and 4th Earl of Angus and 4th Lord Abernethy and Jedburgh Forest. He died without issue and was succeeded by his brother Douglas, 8th Duke of Hamilton. He left no sons and the title passed back to his uncle, the 6th Duke's brother, Archibald, 9th Duke of Hamilton. He was succeeded by his son Alexander, 10th Duke of Hamilton, and then by his son William, 11th Duke of Hamilton. The 11th Duke's daughter was Lady Mary Douglas-Hamilton, who was the Hereditary Princess of Monaco by marriage to Albert, Hereditary Prince of Monaco and became ancestress of the Princes of Monaco. The 11th Duke's son William, 12th Duke of Hamilton (who changed his surname to "Hamilton Douglas"), died without a male heir, and the Dukedom passed to his fourth cousin Alfred, 13th Duke of Hamilton, who was descended from the 4th Duke of Hamilton and whose line of the family had adopted the surname "Douglas-Hamilton". His son was Douglas, 14th Duke of Hamilton, who was succeeded by his son Angus, 15th Duke of Hamilton. He died in 2010, and was succeeded by his son, the current Duke, Alexander, 16th Duke of Hamilton.

== Estates and residences ==
=== Landed estates and mining royalties ===
In the 1883 edition of John Bateman's The Great Landowners of Great Britain and Ireland, William Douglas-Hamilton, 12th Duke of Hamilton's estates were recorded as spanning 157,386 acres across Scotland and England, including 102,210 acres in Buteshire, 45,731 acres in Lanarkshire, 3,694 acres in Linlithgowshire, 810 acres in Stirlingshire, 4,939 acres in Suffolk, and 2 acres in Berkshire, which produced a combined annual income of £73,636. Bateman noted that Duke of Hamilton enjoyed an additional annual income of £67,006 arising from mineral rents on his estate, rendering his total annual income as approximately £140,600.

Following the death of the 12th Duke of Hamilton in 1895, his estates were valued at £1,902,559 for inheritance tax purposes; though these were encumbered by £965,999 of debts. Under the terms of the 12th Duke's will he bequeathed £475,000 (Note: This amount represented the £374,713 combined value which the 4,900-acre Easton Park estate in Suffolk and 102,000-acre Isle of Arran estates (centred on Brodick Castle) in Scotland were appraised at for probate in 1895, as well as a trust fund of £100,000. The estates which were bequeathed to the 13th Duke were also charged with life annuities of £5,000 for the 12th Duke's widow and £7,000 for his daughter.) to his daughter and only child Lady Mary Hamilton (who later became the Duchess of Montrose by marriage) rather than his fourth cousin and heir Alfred Douglas-Hamilton, 13th Duke of Hamilton.

During the early 20th century the Hamilton Estates Trust held 41 coal leaseholds in Scotland, which produced royalties averaging £113,793 per year during the period between 1908 to 1918. In 1922 the 13th Duke sold 19,363 acres of his Scottish estates for approximately £330,000, most of which were purchased by the existing tenants of the estates.

=== Family seats ===
==== Hamilton Palace ====
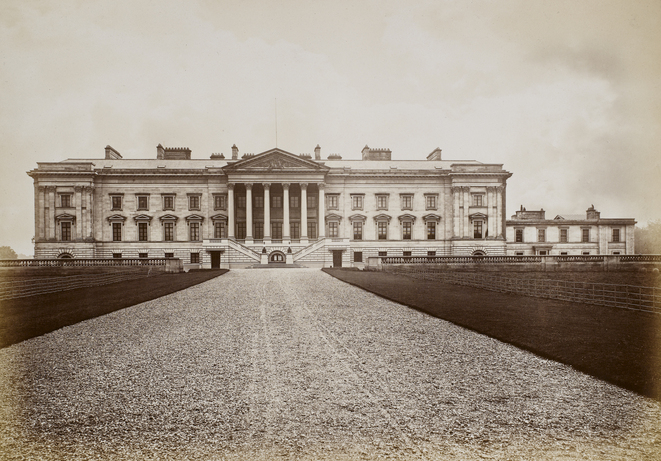
Hamilton Palace in 1870

From 1591 until the late 19th century, the principal seat of the Dukes of Hamilton was Hamilton Palace in Hamilton, South Lanarkshire. The site had been in the possession of the family since the 13th century; a 14th-century tower house, known variously as 'The Orchard' or the 'Castle of Hamilton', served as the seat of the Hamilton family and formed the core of a major rebuilding and extension project undertaken in the late 1500s. Following its completion, the house became known as Hamilton Palace.

Anne, 3rd Duchess of Hamilton, and her husband, William, Duke of Hamilton, commissioned a major rebuilding programme at Hamilton Palace between 1684 and 1701, and following his succession to the ducal title and estates in 1819 Alexander, 10th Duke of Hamilton undertook further works to enlarge and enhance the north front of Hamilton Palace. Alfred Douglas-Hamilton, 13th Duke of Hamilton inherited the property in 1895, although he did not reside there.

The palace was used as a convalescent hospital during the First World War. In late 1919 most of its contents, furnishings and internal fittings were sold, and the building itself was sold in 1921. The building was demolished in stages between 1921 and 1932, after coal workings beneath the house were found to have caused subsidence and threatened its structural integrity.

==== Brodick Castle ====
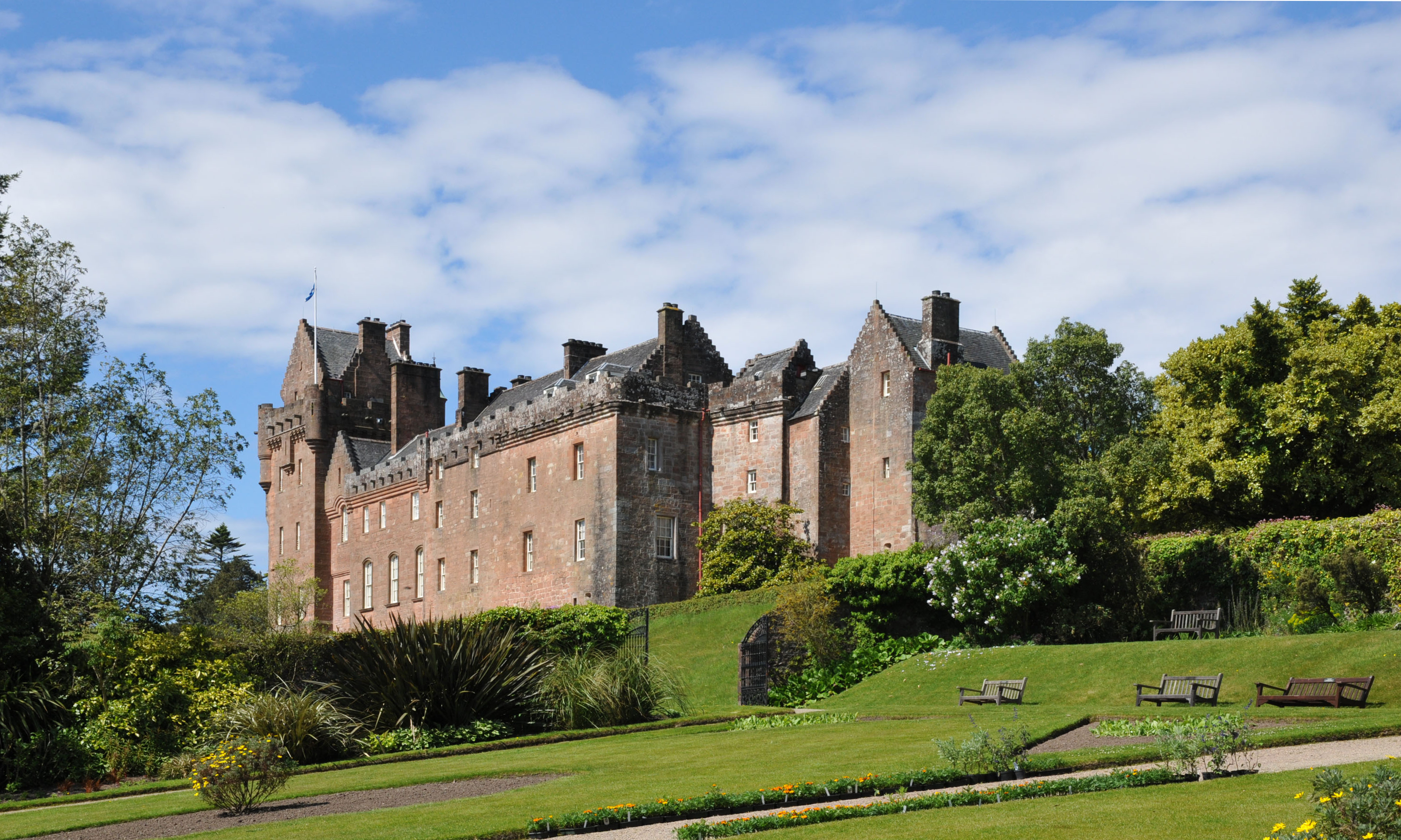
Brodick Castle

Brodick Castle on the Isle of Arran was granted by King James IV of Scotland to his uncle James Hamilton, 2nd Lord Hamilton, in 1503. The castle remained the property of the Hamilton family until the death of William Douglas-Hamilton, 12th Duke of Hamilton in 1895. The 12th Duke bequeathed Brodick Castle and its 102,000-acre estate, which comprised most of the Isle of Arran, to his only child, Lady Mary Hamilton.

==== Dungavel House ====
The 13th Duke oversaw the construction of a shooting lodge near Strathaven for the Hamilton Palace estate in 1900. The house, named Dungavel House (sometimes referred to as "Dungavel Castle") became the Duke's country seat in the late 1910s. Following his death, the Dungavel estate was inherited by his son, Douglas, 14th Duke of Hamilton, who sold the house and 62 acres of its grounds to the National Coal Board in 1950; the sale price reportedly did not exceed £25,000.

==== Lennoxlove House ====
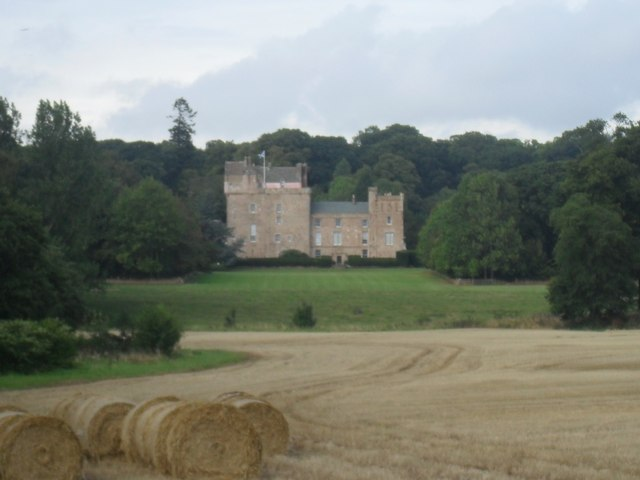
Lennoxlove House

The 14th Duke purchased Lennoxlove House in East Lothian in 1946. It continues to serve as the seat of the Dukes of Hamilton.

==== Easton Park ====
In 1830, Alexander Hamilton, 10th Duke of Hamilton, inherited the Easton Park estate in Suffolk from his younger half-brother William Henry Nassau, 5th Earl of Rochford. The Easton estate had been purchased in 1760 by the Duke's stepfather, Richard Savage Nassau, from the latter's elder brother William Nassau de Zuylestein, 4th Earl of Rochford. The Easton estate remained the property of the Dukes of Hamilton until the death of William Douglas-Hamilton, 12th Duke of Hamilton in 1895, who bequeathed the property to his only child, Lady Mary Hamilton.

=== London residences ===
==== 1621 - 1638: The Palace of Whitehall and Wallingford House ====
During the 1620s and 1630s James Hamilton, 3rd Marquess of Hamilton (created 1st Duke of Hamilton in 1643) spent much of his time in London; he and his wife Mary, Marchioness of Hamilton were both leading courtiers in the Royal Household during this period, filling the roles of Master of the Horse and Lady of the Bedchamber to King Charles I and Queen Henrietta Maria respectively. During the period, the couple had lodgings at Palace of Whitehall, where their daughter Lady Anne Hamilton (who went on to succeed as the 3rd Duchess of Hamilton in her own right) was born.

From 1635 to 1638, Lord and Lady Hamilton occupied Wallingford House, Whitehall, which had been loaned to the couple by Lady Hamilton's aunt Katherine Villiers, Dowager Duchess of Buckingham; the building stood on the site of the modern-day Admiralty buildings.

==== Chelsea Manor ====
Following the Marchioness of Hamilton’s death in 1638, the Lord Hamilton was granted Chelsea Manor House. Shortly afterwards, he commissioned the construction of a new brick mansion to adjoin the existing Tudor manor house at Chelsea Place; after construction was completed the building became known as Hamilton House.

Following the outbreak of the English Civil War in 1642, Lord Hamilton was made Duke of Hamilton in 1643. During the mid-1640s he transferred his interest in Hamilton House, Chelsea to his half-brother-in-law John Hamilton, 1st Lord Belhaven and Stenton; the house subsequently passed into the hands of creditors and was later sold to Charles Cheyne (later created 1st Viscount Newhaven in 1681) in 1657. Hamilton House was later purchased by the Diocese of Winchester in 1664 for £4,250 as a new residence for the Bishop of Winchester, and the building was renamed Winchester House; it was eventually demolished in 1828.

==== 2nd, 3rd, and 4th Dukes and Duchesses ====
The 1st Duke of Hamilton died in 1649 and was succeeded by his younger brother William Hamilton, 2nd Duke of Hamilton. Known by the courtesy title of Earl of Lanark prior to his accession, he had previously rented lodging in King Street during the early 1630s. Following Lord Lanark’s marriage to Elizabeth Maxwell in 1638, he took up residence in a mansion Angell Court near Charing Cross.

Following the death of the 2nd Duke, he was succeeded by his niece Lady Anne Hamilton, who became the suo jure 3rd Duchess of Hamilton; the Dukedom had been bestowed upon Anne’s father with a special remainder which provided that, should the 1st Duke die without sons, the Dukedom would descend first to the 1st Duke’s younger brother and his male heirs, and failing this, it would instead devolve upon the 1st Duke’s daughters.

In 1656 the 3rd Duchess married William Douglas, Earl of Selkirk, who was made Duke of Hamilton for life. The couple did not maintain a permanent residence in London, instead renting a series of lodgings in King Street, Pall Mall, Leicester Fields and St Albans Street during the 1660’s and 1670’s during their visits to London. The 3rd Duchess died in 1716; however, following the death of her husband in 1694, in 1698 she had resigned all of her titles into the hands of King William III, who had regranted them to her eldest son James Hamilton, 4th Duke of Hamilton, who was also made Duke of Brandon in the Peerage of Great Britain in 1711. (Note: Under the Acts of Union 1707, the Scottish peerage was represented in the British House of Lords by sixteen elected representative peers, rather than all Scottish peers enjoying an automatic right to sit. Although the 4th Duke was created Duke of Brandon in the Peerage of Great Britain in 1711, the House of Lords ruled on 20 December 1711 that the new title did not entitle him to a seat. This ruling remained in force until 1782, when the 8th Duke of Hamilton successfully established his right to sit in the House of Lords as Duke of Brandon.)

In 1708 the 4th Duke and his second wife Elizabeth, Duchess of Hamilton took a house in St James's Square, which had previously been the town residence of Henry Bentinck, 1st Duke of Portland. The 4th Duke stayed at this house during the evening prior to 15 November 1712, when he died during a duel with Charles Mohun, 4th Baron Mohun. Following his death, his widow Elizabeth, Dowager Duchess of Hamilton, continued to occupy the house until 1716; the house subsequently became the residence of the Bishops of London. A new house, now known as London House and located at No. 32 St James's Square, was constructed on the site of the 4th Duke’s house between 1819–1821 to designs by Samuel Pepys Cockerell and Charles Robert Cockerell, replacing the earlier mansion.

==== Grosvenor Street and Portman Square ====
No. 49 Grosvenor Street, the London residence of the 5th and 6th Dukes of Hamilton between 1737 and 1757.

The 4th Duke was succeeded by his son James Hamilton, 5th Duke of Hamilton. Following his second marriage to Elizabeth Strangeways in 1727, he came into possession of No. 19 Grosvenor Street, which Elizabeth had purchased the leasehold of in 1725; however he vacated the house following Elizabeth's death in 1729. In 1737 the 5th Duke leased No. 49 Grosvenor Street, Mayfair, which remained as his London home until his death in 1743. He was succeeded by his eldest son James Hamilton, 6th Duke of Hamilton, who continued to lease 49 Grosvenor Street until 1757. The 6th Duke died in 1758, and was succeeded by his elder son James Hamilton, 7th Duke of Hamilton, who died in 1769 and was succeeded by the 6th Duke's younger son Douglas Hamilton, 8th Duke of Hamilton.

Following the 8th Duke’s death in 1799, he was succeeded by his half-great-uncle Archibald Hamilton, 9th Duke of Hamilton, who was a younger son of the 5th Duke of Hamilton. Prior to his accession, the 9th Duke (then known as Lord Archibald Hamilton) had rented a house in St James’s Square during the late 1760s, where his son Alexander Hamilton (later 10th Duke of Hamilton) was born in 1767. By 1769 Lord Archibald had leased a new London house in Portman Square, which he retained until c. 1790, when he established a new residence in Grosvenor Place. Following his succession as 9th Duke of Hamilton, he retained this house as his London residence, and his grandson William Hamilton, Earl of Angus and Arran (later 11th Duke of Hamilton) was born there in 1811.

The 9th Duke died in 1819, and was succeeded by his son Alexander Hamilton, 10th Duke of Hamilton. By 1820 the 10th Duke had leased No. 12 Portman Square (later renumbered as 15 Portman Square in 1852), which he continued to occupy until his death in August 1852.

==== Hamilton House, Arlington Street ====
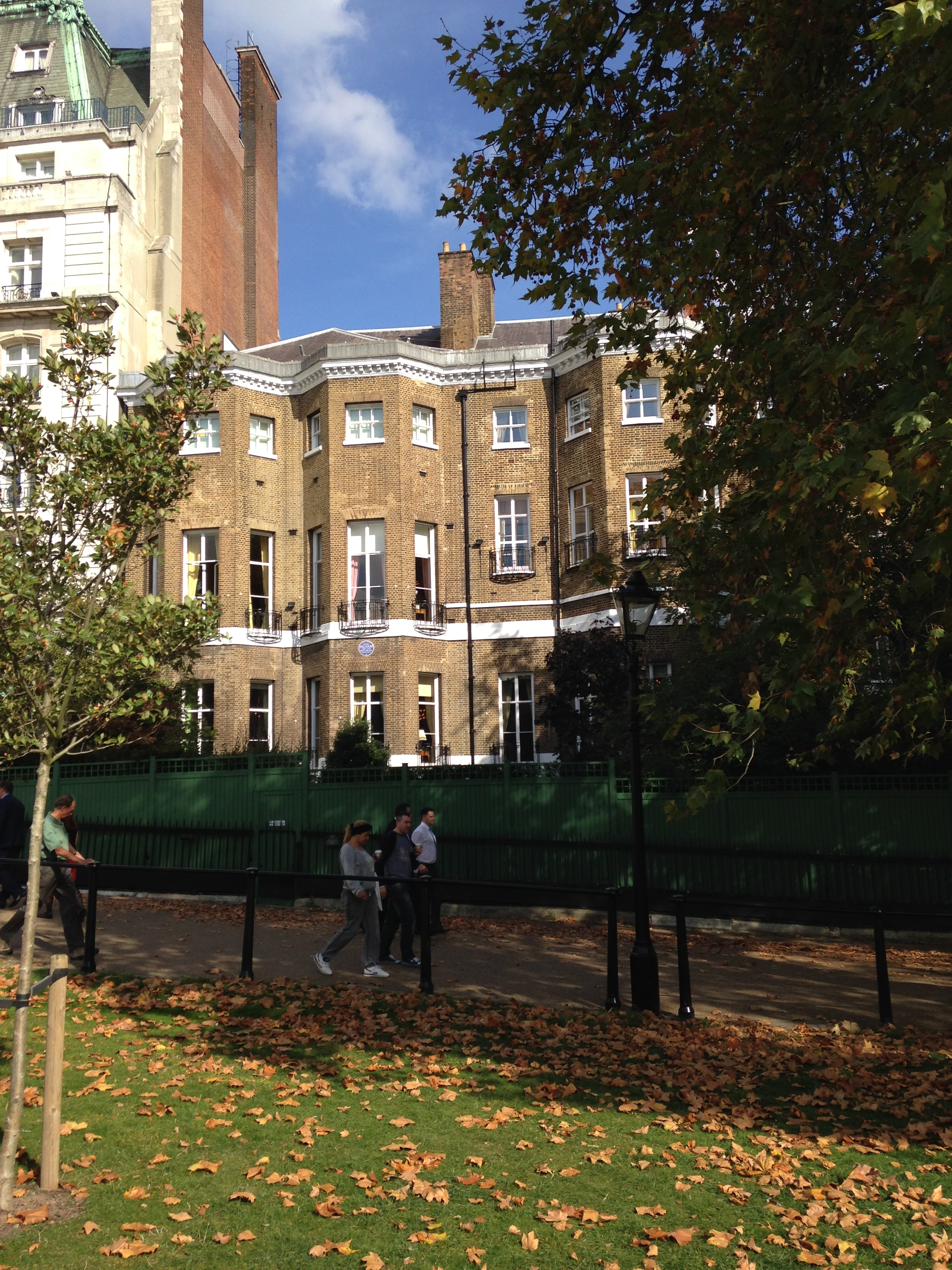
Hamilton House, 22 Arlington Street, the London residence of the 11th Duke of Hamilton and subsequently his widow from 1852 to 1867.

The 10th Duke was succeeded by his eldest son William Hamilton, 11th Duke of Hamilton, who had leased No. 13 Connaught Place, Bayswater during the 1840s, where his son, William, Marquess of Douglas and Clydesdale (later 12th Duke of Hamilton) was born in March 1845.

Within months of his succession to the Dukedom and family estates, the 11th Duke purchased Beaufort House, 22 Arlington Street from Henry Somerset, 7th Duke of Beaufort, for a reported £60,000 in December 1852, and the house then became known as Hamilton House. The 11th Duke had also been appointed as Knight Marischal of Scotland in 1846; this appointment came with the right to use No. 25 St James's Place in London, which the 11th Duke may have used in addition to Hamilton House during the mid-1850s.

The 11th Duke continued to own Hamilton House until his death in 1863, and during this period he spent considerable amounts of money on the decoration of Hamilton House, Following his death he was succeeded by his son William Douglas-Hamilton, 12th Duke of Hamilton, whilst his widow Princess Marie Amelie of Baden, Dowager Duchess of Hamilton continued to live at Hamilton House until 1867, when Hamilton House was sold to Sir Ivor Bertie Guest, 2nd Bt. Guest was later created Baron Wimborne in 1880, which became the basis for the building’s current name, Wimbourne House.

==== Hill Street and Prince's Gate ====
By 1878 the 12th Duke had leased No. 20 Hill Street, Berkeley Square, which he continued to occupy until he sold the lease to Arthur Smith-Barry MP in February 1890. During the final years of his life, the 12th Duke leased No. 23 Prince's Gate; after his death in 1895, he was succeeded by his fourth-cousin Alfred Douglas-Hamilton, 13th Duke of Hamilton. The 13th Duke initially retained 23 Prince’s Gate as his London House, and later sold the lease to Stuart Rendel, 1st Baron Rendel in March 1899.

No. 20 Hill Street, Mayfair, the London residence of the 12th Duke of Hamilton from c. 1878 until 1890.

==== Twentieth century ====
Under the terms of the 12th Duke’s will, the 13th Duke’s income from the Hamilton Estates Trust had been limited to £10,000 a year until the substantial debts the 12th Duke had accrued (which stood at £967,000 in 1895) were cleared, which eventually occurred in 1908. Following this, the 13th Duke rented Bourdon House, Mayfair from the Grosvenor Estate for the London season of 1910. Little evidence survives of the 13th Duke maintaining as London residence during the 1910s; by July 1922 he had leased an apartment in Cleveland House at No. 19 St James's Square, which he and his wife continued to occupy until mid-1927.

By late 1928 the 13th Duke had taken No. 25 St Edmund’s Terrace, St John's Wood as his new London residence. Following the 13th Duke's death in March 1940, 25 St Edmund's Terrace continued to be the London home of his widow Nina, Dowager Duchess of Hamilton; she later died at the house on 12 January 1951.

The 13th Duke was succeeded by his son Douglas Douglas-Hamilton, 14th Duke of Hamilton. Prior to his father's death, the 14th Duke (then known as Douglas, Marquess of Clydesdale) had purchased the leasehold of a townhouse No. 107 Eaton Square, Belgravia in January 1938, where his eldest son, Angus Douglas-Hamilton, Earl of Angus was born in the following September. The 14th Duke continued to maintain No. 107 Eaton Square as his London residence during the 1940s and 1950s.

In October 1962 planning permission was obtained to convert both 107 and 108 Eaton Square into self-contained flats; following the commencement of construction, in March 1965 a fire severely damaged both houses; at the time the 14th Duke was using 114 Eaton Square as his temporary London home.

After the conversion of 107 and 108 Eaton Square into apartments was completed, the Duke’s London address continued to be No. 107 Eaton Square; however, rather than occupying the entire house his residence was a six-bedroom maisonette located on the building's 1st and 2nd floors. Following the 14th Duke’s death in 1973, the apartment was inherited by his son Angus Douglas-Hamilton, 15th Duke of Hamilton, who later sold the property for £250,000 in April 1977.

== Succession to the Dukedom of Hamilton ==
The letters patent that created the Dukedom of Hamilton contained a special remainder. It stipulated that the Dukedom should descend to:

1. heirs male of the body of the grantee, failing which to
2. the grantee's brother and heirs male of the body of the grantee's brother, failing which to
3. the grantee's eldest daughter and heirs male of her body, failing which to
4. nearest heirs whatsoever of the grantee.

As the first Duke and his brother (the second Duke) both died without surviving sons, the succession has, since 1651, been governed by the third rule given, with the dukedom going to the grantee's daughter (the third Duchess) and her heirs male.

== House of Douglas ==
George Douglas, an illegitimate son of William Douglas, 1st Earl of Douglas, was created Earl of Angus on 9 April 1389.

His descendant, William, 11th Earl of Angus, was created Marquess of Douglas, Earl of Angus and Lord Abernethy and Jedburgh Forest on 14 June 1633.

His great-grandson, Archibald, 3rd Marquess of Douglas, was created Duke of Douglas, Marquess of Angus and Abernethy, Viscount of Jedburgh Forest and Lord Douglas of Bonkill, Prestoun and Robertoun on 10 April 1703.

He died, married but childless, in 1761, at which point the Dukedom of Douglas (and the titles created with it) became extinct, but the Marquessate of Douglas, both Earldoms of Angus and the Lordship of Abernethy and Jedburgh Forest passed to his second cousin twice removed and heir male, James Hamilton, 7th Duke of Hamilton.

== Arms ==
Coat of arms of Duke of Hamilton
Crest 1st, on a Ducal Coronet an Oak Tree rutted and penetrated transversely in the main stem by a Frame Saw proper the frame Or (Hamilton); 2nd, on a Chapeau Gules turned up Ermine a Salamander in flames proper (Douglas) Escutcheon Quarterly: 1st and 4th grandquarters: quarterly: 1st and 4th, Gules three Cinquefoils Ermine (Hamilton); 2nd and 3rd, Argent a Lymphad with the sails furled proper flagged Gules (Arran); 2nd and 3rd grandquarters: Argent a Heart Gules imperially crowned Or on a Chief Azure three Mullets of the first (Douglas) Supporters On either side an Antelope Argent armed unguled ducally gorged and chained Or Motto Over 1st crest: Through; Over 2nd crest: Jamais Arriere (Never Behind)

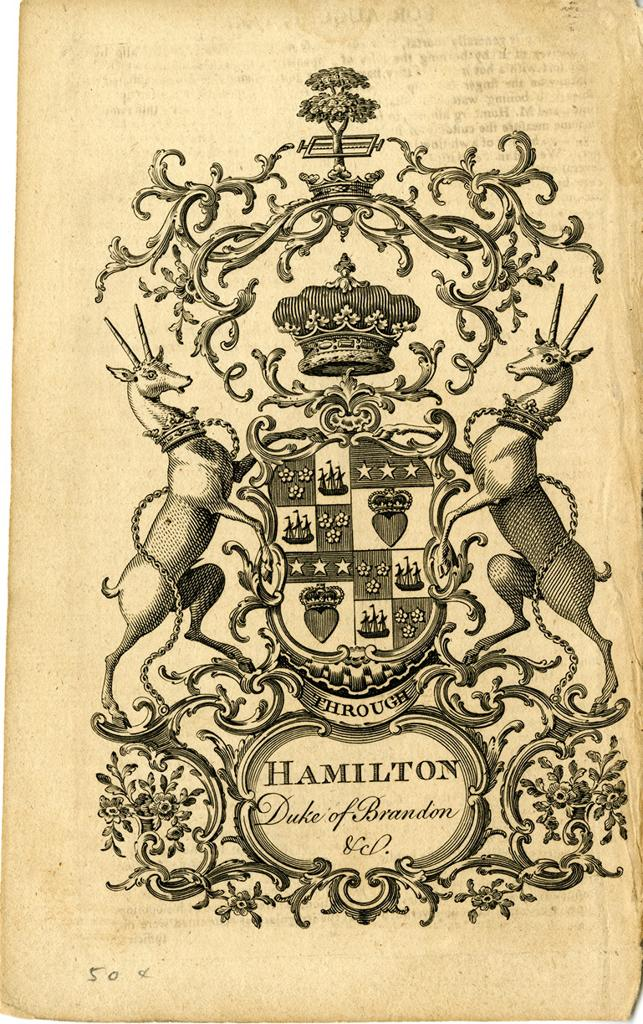
Bookplate showing an early coat of arms for the Duke of Hamilton and Brandon

The arms of the current Duke of Hamilton and Brandon are: quarterly: 1st and 4th grand quarters: quarterly: 1st and 4th, Gules three Cinquefoils Ermine (for Hamilton); 2nd and 3rd, Argent a Lymphad with the sails furled proper flagged Gules (for Arran); 2nd and 3rd grand quarters: Argent a Heart Gules imperially crowned Or on a Chief Azure three Mullets of the first (for Douglas).

The achievement has two crests, namely: 1st, on a Ducal Coronet an Oak Tree rutted and penetrated transversely in the main stem by a Frame Saw proper the frame Or (for Hamilton); 2nd, on a Chapeau Gules turned up Ermine a Salamander in flames proper (for Douglas). The supporters are: on either side an Antelope Argent armed unguled ducally gorged and chained Or. Each crest has a motto, namely "Through" (over the 1st crest) and "Jamais Arriere" ("Never Behind") (over the 2nd crest).

== List of titleholders ==
=== Lairds of Cadzow (c. 1315) ===
- Walter fitz Gilbert, 1st of Cadzow (c. 1250– bef. 1336)
- David fitz Walter, 2nd of Cadzow (c. 1310–1374/1378)
- David Hamilton, 3rd of Cadzow (c. 1333 – c. 1392)
- John Hamilton, 4th of Cadzow (d. bef. 1410)
- James Hamilton, 5th of Cadzow (d. bef. 1441)
- James Hamilton, 6th of Cadzow (d. 1479) (created Lord Hamilton in 1445)

=== Lords Hamilton (1445) ===
- James Hamilton (d. 1479), 1st Lord Hamilton
- James Hamilton (c. 1475–1529), 2nd Lord Hamilton (created Earl of Arran in 1503)

=== Earls of Arran, second Creation (1503) ===
- James Hamilton (c. 1475–1529), 1st Earl of Arran
- James Hamilton (1515–1575), 2nd Earl of Arran (also Duke of Châtellerault in the French nobility from 1548 until 1559)
- James Hamilton (1533/1538–1609), 3rd Earl of Arran (under attainder 1579–1585)
- James Hamilton (1589–1625), 4th Earl of Arran (had already succeeded as 2nd Marquess of Hamilton)

=== Marquesses of Hamilton (1599) ===
- John Hamilton (c. 1535–1604), 1st Marquess of Hamilton (created Marquess of Hamilton in the lifetime of his elder brother, the 3rd Earl of Arran)
- James Hamilton (1589–1625), 2nd Marquess of Hamilton, 1st Earl of Cambridge (succeeded as 4th Earl of Arran in 1609)
- James Hamilton (1606–1649), 3rd Marquess of Hamilton, 2nd Earl of Cambridge (created Duke of Hamilton in 1643)
  - Charles Hamilton, styled Earl of Arran (1634–1640) (eldest son of the 3rd Marquess, predeceased his father in childhood)

=== Dukes of Hamilton (1643) ===
- James Hamilton (1606–1649), 1st Duke of Hamilton, 2nd Earl of Cambridge
  - Charles Hamilton, styled Earl of Arran (d. 1640)
- William Hamilton (1616–1651), 2nd Duke of Hamilton, 3rd Earl of Cambridge (created Earl of Lanark in 1639)
  - James Hamilton, styled Lord Polmont (d. 1648)
- Anne Hamilton (c. 1631–1716), 3rd Duchess of Hamilton (resigned the Dukedom in her son's favour in 1698)

m. William Douglas (1635–1694), later Hamilton, Duke of Hamilton, 1st Earl of Selkirk (created Duke of Hamilton for life in 1660)

- James Hamilton (1658–1712), 4th Duke of Hamilton, 1st Duke of Brandon (created Duke of Brandon in 1711)
- James Hamilton (1703–1743), 5th Duke of Hamilton, 2nd Duke of Brandon
- James Hamilton (1724–1758), 6th Duke of Hamilton, 3rd Duke of Brandon
- James Hamilton (1755–1769), 7th Duke of Hamilton, 4th Duke of Brandon (succeeded as 4th Marquess of Douglas in 1761)
- Douglas Hamilton (1756–1799), 8th Duke of Hamilton, 5th Duke of Brandon
- Archibald Hamilton (1740–1819), 9th Duke of Hamilton, 6th Duke of Brandon
- Alexander Douglas Hamilton (1767–1852), 10th Duke of Hamilton, 7th Duke of Brandon
- William Alexander Anthony Archibald Douglas-Hamilton (1811–1863), 11th Duke of Hamilton, 8th Duke of Brandon
- William Alexander Louis Stephen Douglas-Hamilton (1845–1895), 12th Duke of Hamilton, 9th Duke of Brandon, 8th Earl of Selkirk
- Alfred Douglas Douglas-Hamilton (1862–1940), 13th Duke of Hamilton, 10th Duke of Brandon, 9th Earl of Selkirk
- Douglas Douglas-Hamilton (1903–1973), 14th Duke of Hamilton, 11th Duke of Brandon
- Angus Alan Douglas Douglas-Hamilton (1938–2010), 15th Duke of Hamilton, 12th Duke of Brandon
- Alexander Douglas Douglas-Hamilton (b. 1978), 16th Duke of Hamilton, 13th Duke of Brandon

The heir apparent is the present Duke's eldest son Douglas Charles Douglas-Hamilton, Marquess of Douglas and Clydesdale (b. 2012).

== Line of succession ==
Line of succession (simplified)
- James Hamilton, 4th Duke of Hamilton, 1st Duke of Brandon (1660–1724)
  - James Hamilton, 5th Duke of Hamilton, 2nd Duke of Brandon (1703–1743)
    - James Hamilton, 6th Duke of Hamilton, 3rd Duke of Brandon (1724–1758)
      - James Hamilton, 7th Duke of Hamilton, 4th Duke of Brandon (1755–1769)
      - Douglas Hamilton, 8th Duke of Hamilton, 5th Duke of Brandon (1756–1799)
    - Archibald Hamilton, 9th Duke of Hamilton, 6th Duke of Brandon (1740–1819)
      - Alexander Hamilton, 10th Duke of Hamilton, 7th Duke of Brandon (1767–1852)
        - William Hamilton, 11th Duke of Hamilton, 8th Duke of Brandon (1811–1863)
          - William Douglas-Hamilton, 12th Duke of Hamilton, 9th Duke of Brandon (1845–1895)
  - Lord Anne Hamilton (1709–1748)
    - Admiral Charles Powell Hamilton (1747–1825)
      - Augustus Barrington Price Anne Powell Douglas-Hamilton (1781–1849)
        - Captain Charles Henry Douglas-Hamilton (1808–1873)
          - Alfred Douglas-Hamilton, 13th Duke of Hamilton, 10th Duke of Brandon, 9th Earl of Selkirk (1862–1940)
            - Douglas Douglas-Hamilton, 14th Duke of Hamilton, 11th Duke of Brandon (1903–1973)
              - Angus Douglas-Hamilton, 15th Duke of Hamilton, 12th Duke of Brandon (1938–2010)
                - Alexander Douglas-Hamilton, 16th Duke of Hamilton, 13th Duke of Brandon (b. 1978)
                  - (1). Douglas Charles Douglas-Hamilton, Marquess of Douglas and Clydesdale (b. 2012)
                  - (2). Lord William Frederick Douglas-Hamilton (b. 2014)
                  - (3). Lord Basil George Douglas-Hamilton (b. 2016)
                - (4). Lord John William Douglas-Hamilton (b. 1979)
              - James Alexander Douglas-Hamilton, 11th Earl of Selkirk, Baron Selkirk of Douglas (1942–2023)
                - (5). John Andrew Douglas-Hamilton, 12th Earl of Selkirk (b. 1978)
                - (6). Hon. Charles Douglas Douglas-Hamilton (b. 1979)
                - (7). Hon. James Robert Douglas-Hamilton (b. 1981)
                - (8). Hon. Harry Alexander Douglas-Hamilton (b. 1981)
              - Lord Hugh Malcolm Douglas-Hamilton (1946–1995)
                - (9). Brendan Thomas Douglas-Hamilton (b. 1974)
              - (10). Lord Patrick George Douglas-Hamilton (b. 1950)
            - George Douglas-Hamilton, 10th Earl of Selkirk (1906–1994)
            - Lord Malcolm Avondale Douglas-Hamilton (1909–1964)
              - male issue and descendants in remainder
        - Francis Seymour Douglas-Hamilton (1811–1874)
          - Algernon Percy Douglas-Hamilton (1844–1891)
            - Percy Seymour Douglas-Hamilton (1875–1940)
              - John Percy Douglas-Hamilton (1930–2008)
                - male issue in remainder

The next line of heirs (under provision 4 of the special remainder) is those of the heirs whatsoever of the 3rd Duchess, namely Edward Stanley, 19th Earl of Derby (b. 1962) (a descendant of the 6th Duke through his only daughter, Lady Elizabeth Hamilton, who married Edward Smith-Stanley, 12th Earl of Derby). Lord Derby is not, however, an heir to the Marquessate of Douglas and its subsidiary titles, which would pass to the heir male (a junior-line descendant of one of the Earls of Angus, as the heirs male of the body of the 3rd Duchess are the only remaining heirs male of the body of the 1st Marquess of Douglas). He is also not an heir to the Dukedom of Brandon or the Barony of Dutton, which are limited to the heirs male of the body of the 3rd Duchess.

== Family Tree ==
Douglas-Hamilton family trees: Dukes of: Abercorn, Brandon, and Hamilton with subsidiary and courtesy titles

James II; 1430–1460; King of Scotland
Earl of Arran (Scotland) (1st creation), 1467	Lord Hamilton, 1445
Thomas Boyd d. c. 1473; Earl of Arran	Mary Stewart; 1453–1488 dowager Countess of Arran	James Hamilton c. 1415–1479; 1st Lord Hamilton	James III; 1451–1488; King of Scotland
Earldom of Arran (1st creation) forfeit, 1469
Earl of Arran (Scotland) (2nd creation), 1503
James Hamilton c. 1475–1529; 2nd Lord Hamilton, 1st Earl of Arran	James IV; 1473–1513; King of Scotland
Catherine Stewart (illegit.) c. 1495–1554	James Douglas d. 1548; Earl of Morton
Duke of Châtellerault (France) (5th creation), 1548
James Hamilton c. 1516–1575; 2nd Earl of Arran, 3rd Lord Hamilton, 1st Duke of Châtellerault	Margaret Douglas c. 1510–1579
Dukedom of Châtellerault (5th creation) forfeit, 1559
Marquess of Hamilton, Earl of Arran, and Lord Aven, 1599	Lord Paisley, 1587
James Hamilton c. 1533–1609; 3rd Earl of Arran, 4th Lord Hamilton	Anne Hamilton c. 1535 – c. 1574 m. George Gordon Earl of Huntly	John Hamilton; 1540–1604; 1st Marquess of Hamilton, etc.	Claud Hamilton; 1546–1621; Lord Paisley
Earl of Cambridge (England) (4th creation) and Baron of Innerdale, 1619	Lord Abercorn, 1603; Earl of Abercorn, Lord of Paisley, Hamilton, Mountcastell and Kilpatrick, 1606
George Gordon; 1562–1636; Marquess of Huntly	James Hamilton; 1589–1625; 2nd Marquess of Hamilton, etc., 4th Earl of Arran, 1st Earl of Cambridge, etc. 5th Lord Hamilton, Lord Aberbrothwick/Arbroath	James Hamilton; 1575–1618; 1st Earl of Abercorn, Lord Abercorn and Lord of Paisley, Hamilton, Mountcastell and Kilpatrick
Earldom of Angus (1389 creation) resigned in favor of: Marquess of Douglas, Earl of Angus, Lord Abernethy, Lord Bonkyll and Preston, Lord Abernethy, and Lord Jedburgh Forest, 1633	Duke of Hamilton, Marquess of Clydesdale, Earl of Arran and Cambridge (Scotland) and Baron of Aven and Innerdale, 1643	Earl of Lanark, 1639	Baron Hamilton of Strabane, 1617
William Douglas; 1589–1660; 1st Marquess of Douglas, etc. 11th Earl of Angus (1389 creation)	Mary Gordon c. 1600–1674	James Hamilton; 1606–1649; 1st Duke of Hamilton, etc., 3rd Marquess of Hamilton, etc., 5th Earl of Arran, 2nd Earl of Cambridge, etc.	William Hamilton; 1616–1651; 2nd Duke of Hamilton, etc., 1st Earl of Lanark, 6th Earl of Arran, 3rd Earl of Cambridge, etc.	James Hamilton c. 1604 – c. 1670; 2nd Earl of Abercorn, etc., 2nd Lord Paisley, 1st Lord Hamilton of Strabane	Claud Hamilton c. 1606–1638; 2nd Lord Hamilton of Strabane	George Hamilton c. 1607–1679
Earldom of Cambridge (4th creation) and Barony of Innerdale extinct and Earldom of Arran (2nd creation) dormant, 1651
Earl of Selkirk and Lord Daer and Shortcleuch, 1646
see Earl of Ormond family tree for Marquesses of Douglas, Earls of Angus, etc.	William Douglas-Hamilton; 1634–1694 jure uxoris Duke of Hamilton, etc. suo jure, 1st Earl of Selkirk, etc.	Anne Hamilton; 1631–1716 suo jure 3rd Duchess of Hamilton, etc., 2nd Countess of Lanark	George Hamilton c. 1636 – c. 1680; 3rd Earl of Abercorn, etc.	James Hamilton c. 1633 – c. 1670; Lord Paisley	James Hamilton; 1633–1655; 3rd Lord Hamilton of Strabane	George Hamilton c. 1636–1668; 4th Lord Hamilton of Strabane	James Hamilton c. 1620–1673
Ceded Dukedom of Hamilton to 4th Duke, 1698
Duke of Brandon and Baron Dutton, 1711	Earl of Ruglen, 1697	Earl of Orkney (3rd creation), 1697	Viscount Strabane and Baron Mountcastle, 1701
James Hamilton; 1658–1712; 4th Duke of Hamilton, etc., 1st Duke of Brandon, etc. 3rd Earl of Lanark, etc.	Charles Douglas; 1663–1739; 2nd Earl of Selkirk, etc.	John Douglas-Hamilton; 1664–1744; 3rd Earl of Selkirk, etc., 1st Earl of Ruglen	George Hamilton; 1666–1737; 1st Earl of Orkney	Basil Hamilton; 1671–1701	Catherine Hamilton	Charles Hamilton d. 1701; 5th Earl of Abercorn, etc., 6th Lord Hamilton of Strabane	Claud Hamilton; 1658–1691; 4th Earl of Abercorn, etc., 5th Lord Hamilton of Strabane	James Hamilton c. 1661–1734; 6th Earl of Abercorn, etc., 7th Lord Hamilton of Strabane
see Earls of Ruglen	see Earls of Orkney	Basil Hamilton; 1696–1742	James Hamilton; 1685–1744; 7th Earl of Abercorn, etc., 8th Lord Hamilton of Strabane
Viscount Hamilton, 1786
James Hamilton; 1703–1743; 5th Duke of Hamilton, etc., 2nd Duke of Brandon, etc. 4th Earl of Lanark, etc.	Lord Anne Hamilton; 1709–1748	Dunbar Douglas; 1722–1799; 4th Earl of Selkirk, etc.	James Hamilton; 1712–1789; 8th Earl of Abercorn, etc., 9th Lord Hamilton of Strabane, 1st Viscount Hamilton	John Hamilton; 1714–1755
Baron Hamilton of Hameldon county, Leicester, 1776	Marquess of Abercorn, 1790
James Hamilton; 1724–1758; 6th Duke of Hamilton, etc., 3rd Duke of Brandon, etc., 5th Earl of Lanark, etc.	Elizabeth Gunning (c. 1733–1790) suo jure 1st Baroness Hamilton	Archibald Hamilton; 1740–1819; 9th Duke of Hamilton, etc., 6th Duke of Brandon, 8th Earl of Lanark, etc.	Charles Powell Hamilton; 1747–1825	John Hamilton; 1756–1818; 1st Marquess of Abercorn, 9th Earl of Abercorn, etc., 10th Lord Hamilton of Strabane
James Hamilton; 1755–1769; 7th Duke of Hamilton, etc., 4th Duke of Brandon and Baron Dutton, Marquess of Angus and Abernethy, 4th Marquess of Douglas, etc., 6th Earl of Lanark, etc.	Douglas Hamilton; 1756–1799; 8th Duke of Hamilton, etc., 5th Duke of Brandon, Marquess of Douglas, etc.<>br/>7th Earl of Lanark, etc., 2nd Baron Hamilton	Alexander Hamilton; 1767–1852; 10th Duke of Hamilton, etc., 7th Duke of Brandon, Marquess of Douglas, and Baron Dutton, Earl of Angus, and Lord Abernethy and Jedburgh Forest, 9th Earl of Lanark, etc.	Augustus Barrington Price Anne Powell Douglas-Hamilton; 1781–1849	Thomas Douglas; 1771–1820; 5th Earl of Selkirk, etc.	James Hamilton; 1786–1818 styled Viscount Hamilton
Duke of Abercorn, of Strabane and Duke of Abercorn, 1868
William Alexander Anthony Archibald Hamilton; 1811–1863; 11th Duke of Hamilton, etc., 8th Duke of Brandon, Marquess of Douglas, Earl of Angus, Lord Abernethy and Jedburgh Forest, and Baron Dutton, 10th Earl of Lanark, etc.	Charles Douglas-Hamilton; 1808–1873	Dunbar James Douglas; 1809–1885; 6th Earl of Selkirk, etc.	James Hamilton; 1811–1885; 1st Duke of Abercorn, 2nd Marquess of Abercorn, 10th Earl of Abercorn, etc., 2nd Viscount Hamilton, 11th Lord Hamilton of Strabane
Duke of Châtellerault (France) (5th creation), revived 1548
William Alexander Louis Stephen Douglas-Hamilton; 1845–1895; 12th Duke of Hamilton, etc., 9th Duke of Brandon, Marquess of Douglas, Earl of Angus, Lord Abernethy and Jedburgh Forest and Baron Dutton, 2nd Duke of Châtellerault, 8th Earl of Selkirk, etc., 11th Earl of Lanark, etc.	Charles George Douglas-Hamilton; 1847–1886; 7th Earl of Selkirk, etc.	James Hamilton; 1838–1913; 2nd Duke of Abercorn, 3rd Marquess of Abercorn, 11th Earl of Abercorn, etc., 12th Lord Hamilton of Strabane
Alfred Douglas Douglas-Hamilton; 1862–1940; 13th Duke of Hamilton, etc., 10th Duke of Brandon, Marquess of Douglas, Earl of Angus (1633 creation), Lord Abernethy and Jedburgh Forest, and Baron Dutton, 20th Earl of Angus (1389 creation), 9th Earl of Selkirk, etc., 12th Earl of Lanark, etc.	James Albert Edward Hamilton; 1869–1953; 3rd Duke of Abercorn, 4th Marquess of Abercorn, 12th Earl of Abercorn, etc., 13th Lord Hamilton of Strabane
Douglas Douglas-Hamilton; 1903–1973; 14th Duke of Hamilton, etc., 11th Duke of Brandon, Marquess of Douglas, Earl of Angus (1633 creation), Lord Abernethy and Jedburgh Forest, and Baron Dutton, 21st Earl of Angus (1389 creation), 13rd Earl of Lanark, etc.	George Nigel Douglas-Hamilton; 1906–1994; 10th Earl of Selkirk, etc., 10th Lord Daer and Shortcleuch	Malcolm Douglas-Hamilton; 1909–1964	James Edward Hamilton; 1904–1979; 4th Duke of Abercorn, 5th Marquess of Abercorn, 13th Earl of Abercorn, etc., 14th Lord Hamilton of Strabane
Baron Selkirk of Douglas, 1997
Angus Alan Douglas Douglas-Hamilton; 1938–2010; 15th Duke of Hamilton, etc., 12th Duke of Brandon, Marquess of Douglas, Earl of Angus (1633 creation), Lord Abernethy and Jedburgh Forest, and Baron Dutton, 22nd Earl of Angus (1389 creation), 14th Earl of Lanark, etc.	James Alexander Douglas-Hamilton; 1942–2023; 11th Earl of Selkirk, etc., Earldom disclaimed, 1994, Baron Selkirk of Douglas	Alasdair Douglas-Hamilton b. 1939	James Hamilton b. 1934; 5th Duke of Abercorn, 6th Marquess of Abercorn, 14th Earl of Abercorn, etc., 15th Lord Hamilton of Strabane
Barony Selkirk of Douglas expired as a life peerage, 2023
Alexander Douglas-Hamilton b. 1978; 16th Duke of Hamilton, etc., 13th Duke of Brandon, Marquess of Douglas, Earl of Angus (1633 creation), Lord Abernethy and Jedburgh Forest, and Baron Dutton, 23rd Earl of Angus (1389 creation), 15th Earl of Lanark and Lord Machanshyre and Polmont	John William Douglas-Hamilton b. 1979	John Andrew Douglas-Hamilton b. 1978; 12th Earl of Selkirk, etc.	Charles Douglas Douglas-Hamilton (b. 1979)	Angus Gavin Douglas-Hamilton b. 1968	James Hamilton b. 1969 styled Marquess of Hamilton
Heir presumptive to the Earldom of Selkirk
Douglas Douglas-Hamilton b. 2012 styled Marquess of Douglas and Clydesdale	William Frederick Douglas-Hamilton b. 2014	Basil George Douglas-Hamilton b. 2016	William Douglas-Hamilton b. 1999	James Hamilton b. 2005 styled Viscount Strabane
Heir apparent to the dukedoms of Hamilton and Brandon

== See also ==
- Clan Hamilton
- Clan Douglas
- Earl of Angus
- Earl of Arran (Scotland)
- Earl of Orkney
- Earl of Selkirk
- Lord Abernethy
- Hamilton Palace and Hamilton Mausoleum
- Brodick Castle
- Lennoxlove House
- Holyrood Palace
- Duke of Abercorn
- Lord Belhaven and Stenton

== Works cited ==
- Hesilrige, Arthur G. M. (1921). Debrett's Peerage and Titles of courtesy. 160A, Fleet street, London, UK: Dean & Son. p. 435.
- Burke's Peerage and Baronetage. Vol. 106. 1999. pp. 1742–1748.
- Marshall, Rosalind K. (1974). The Days of Duchess Anne, Life in the Household of the Duchess of Hamilton 1656–1716. Edinburgh years=1974, 2000: St. Martin's Press. ISBN 1862321116. "archive.org"
- A history of the house of Douglas from the earliest times down to the legislative union of England and Scotland. Vol. 1, 2. 217, Picadilly w, London: Freemantle & co. 1902. ISBN 1142332098. "Sir Herbert Maxwell"
