= Martin Page (British author) =

British writer and journalist

- Born: 30 June 1938; Friern Barnet
- Died: 10 September 2003 (aged 65)
- Occupations: Journalist and author

Martin Page (30 June 1938 – 10 September 2003) was a British writer and journalist who founded Business Traveler magazine.

== Education ==
After attending Leighton Park and Millfield, Page went to Pembroke College, Cambridge" where he studied anthropology.

== Career ==
=== Journalism ===
At the age of 24, despite suffering from retinitis pigmentosa, Page became Fleet Street's youngest correspondent, covering seven wars from Algeria to Vietnam. He began his career as a graduate trainee for the Manchester Guardian before joining the Daily Express. In 1975, Page founded Business Traveller magazine. The magazine included Auberon Waugh on its payroll. Page also wrote for The Tablet during his life.

=== Authorship ===
He wrote his first book, Unpersoned in Moscow, where he was the correspondent for the Daily Express. His books, which were published in 14 languages, include Company Savage, which became a bestseller in Japan and Germany, and two novels, The Pilate Plot and The Man Who Stole the Mona Lisa. He also wrote The First Global Village – How Portugal Changed The World in 2002, which has sold over 20,000 copies in both Portuguese and English.

Page also wrote The Good Doctors Guide, which was a source of some controversy in the medical industry.

== Personal life ==
In 1988, Page registered as legally blind. His first wife was Jillian Robertson, later known as the duchess of Hamilton. They had a son, Jaime. Page lived in both Portugal and Rome before returning to Brighton in the UK where he lived the rest of his life. While in Rome, Page and his second wife, Catherine, became Catholic. With Catherine he had two sons, Matthew and Sam.

He died in 2003 of heart problems at the age of 65.
