= Duchess of Abercorn =

Title in the Peerage of Ireland

Duchess of Abercorn is a title given to the wife of the Duke of Abercorn, an extant title in the Peerage of Ireland which was created in 1868 by Queen Victoria. Alexandra Phillips married James Hamilton, 5th Duke of Abercorn in 1966. She was the last person to hold this title and, since her death in 2018, no one holds it, as the 5th Duke is alive and unmarried.

== List of Duchesses of Abercorn ==
| # | Name | Birth | Marriage | Became Duchess of Abercorn | Spouse | Death | Ceased being Duchess of Abercorn | Reason ceased being Duchess of Abercorn |
|---|---|---|---|---|---|---|---|---|
| 1 | Louisa Russell | 8 July 1812 | 25 October 1832 | 10 August 1868 | James Hamilton, 1st Duke of Abercorn | 31 March 1905 | 31 October 1885 | Husband's death |
| 2 | Mary Curzon-Howe | 23 July 1848 | 7 January 1869 | 31 October 1885 | James Hamilton, 2nd Duke of Abercorn | 10 May 1929 | 3 January 1913 | Husband's death |
| 3 | Rosalind Bingham | 26 February 1869 | 1 November 1894 | 3 January 1913 | James Hamilton, 3rd Duke of Abercorn | 18 January 1958 | 12 September 1953 | Husband's death |
| 4 | Kathleen Crichton | 8 July 1905 | 9 February 1928 | 12 September 1953 | James Hamilton, 4th Duke of Abercorn | 2 February 1990 | 4 June 1979 | Husband's death |
| 5 | Alexandra Phillips | 27 February 1946 | 20 October 1966 | 4 June 1979 | James Hamilton, 5th Duke of Abercorn | 10 December 2018 | | Died |
