= Lady Moyra Campbell =

British aristocrat and courtier (1930–2020)

Lady Moyra Campbell CVO
- Born: Lady Moyra Kathleen Hamilton; 22 July 1930; London, United Kingdom
- Died: 8 November 2020 (aged 90); Belfast, United Kingdom
- Spouse: Peter Campbell-Grove (m. 1966)
- Children: 2
- Parents: James Hamilton, 4th Duke of Abercorn (father); The Hon. Kathleen Crichton (mother)

Lady Moyra Kathleen Campbell-Grove CVO (née Hamilton; 22 July 1930 – 8 November 2020) was a British aristocrat and courtier who served as a maid of honour at the coronation of Elizabeth II.

== Early life and family ==
Lady Moyra Hamilton was born on 22 July 1930 in London. She was the eldest child of James Hamilton, Marquess of Hamilton, later 4th Duke of Abercorn, and The Hon. Kathleen Crichton. Her father was the son and heir of James Hamilton, 3rd Duke of Abercorn, and Lady Rosalind Bingham. Her mother was the daughter of Viscount Crichton (himself the son of John Crichton, 4th Earl Erne) and Lady Mary Grosvenor (herself the daughter of Hugh Grosvenor, 1st Duke of Westminster). She was raised at Baronscourt, the Abercorn's seat in County Tyrone. She was a first cousin of John Spencer, 8th Earl Spencer, father of Diana, Princess of Wales.

As a child, she was a member of 1st Buckingham Palace Guide Company which was formed in 1937 for Princess Elizabeth. She was educated at St Mary's School, Wantage, before attending finishing school in Switzerland. She did not attend university.

== Royal service ==
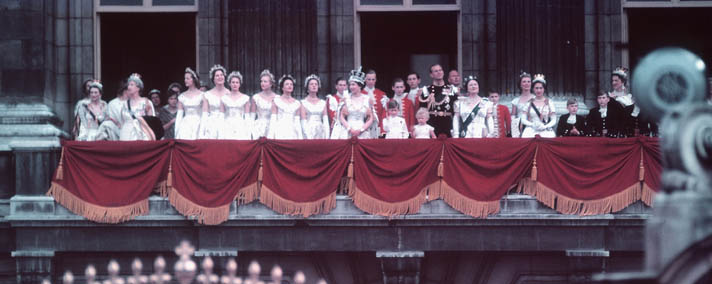
Lady Moyra, front row, second from left, on the balcony of Buckingham Palace following the coronation of Elizabeth II

In 1953, Lady Moyra was one of six well-born young ladies selected as maids of honour at the coronation of Elizabeth II. Her duties included carrying the queen's train during the procession. The maids of honour all wore matching gowns by Norman Hartnell.

From 1954 to 1964 she was a lady-in-waiting to Princess Alexandra. She was made a Commander of the Royal Victorian Order (CVO) on 23 April 1963. She later served as an extra lady-in-waiting to Elizabeth II from 1964 to 1966.

== Later life ==
While in royal service at Buckingham Palace, she met Commander Peter Colin Drummond Campbell (1927–2024), a Royal Navy officer and equerry to Elizabeth II. They married in 1966 and had two sons. The family lived at Hollybrook House in Randalstown, County Antrim.

She was active in philanthropy in Northern Ireland, serving as president of the Northern Ireland Cancer Fund for Children and honorary president of the Early Years (formerly the Northern Ireland Pre-School Playgroup Association). She was also a trustee of the National Society for the Prevention of Cruelty to Children .

Lady Moyra suffered from Alzheimer's disease in her later years. She died on 8 November 2020 at the age of 90 in a nursing home in Belfast.
