= Lord Claud Anthony Hamilton =

British aristocrat

- Born: Lord Claud Anthony Hamilton; 1939; London, United Kingdom
- Died: April 27, 2026 (aged 86–87); Enniskillen, Northern Ireland
- Spouse: Catherine Janet Faulkner (m. 1982)
- Children: 2
- Parents: James Hamilton, 4th Duke of Abercorn (father); Kathleen Hamilton, Duchess of Abercorn (mother)
- Relatives: James Hamilton, 5th Duke of Abercorn (brother); Lady Moyra Campbell (sister)

Lord Claud Anthony Hamilton (1939 – April 27, 2026) was a British aristocrat, soldier, and public figure in County Fermanagh, Northern Ireland. The second son of James Hamilton, 4th Duke of Abercorn, he was a brother of James Hamilton, 5th Duke of Abercorn, and Lady Moyra Campbell. He served as High Sheriff of County Fermanagh, Vice Lord Lieutenant of the county, and Justice of the Peace, and held charitable and civic positions over the years.

== Early life and education ==
Hamilton was born in London in 1939, the second son of James Hamilton, 4th Duke of Abercorn and Kathleen Hamilton, Duchess of Abercorn. During the Second World War, the family lived near Henley-on-Thames while his father served in the army and his mother worked for the Red Cross. After the war, the family returned to Barons Court in County Tyrone.

He was educated at Eton College, Windsor, before joining the Irish Guards, where he saw active service in Cyprus and was commissioned as a Lieutenant in 1957. Following his military service, he and a fellow former Irish Guardsman drove a Land Rover from London to Delhi.

== Career ==
=== Stockbroking and the National Trust ===
Hamilton settled in London, where he worked as a stockbroker. His firm subsequently posted him to Vancouver, Canada. He later moved to Northern Ireland to take on a role with the National Trust as joint Administrator for Castlecoole and Florencecourt, during which time he lived at Florencecourt for several years. He also served in the Ulster Defence Regiment (UDR), where he led a platoon.

=== Public appointments ===
Hamilton was appointed Deputy Lord Lieutenant of County Fermanagh in 1978 and subsequently became Vice Lord Lieutenant. In 1990, he was appointed High Sheriff of County Fermanagh, acting as the sovereign's judicial representative in the county, with responsibilities including the execution of High Court writs. In 1991, he was appointed a Justice of the Peace.

In 1975, he purchased Mullaghmeen, a farm near Ballinamallard, County Fermanagh. During a visit by Elizabeth II to Enniskillen, Hamilton accompanied her from St Macartin's Cathedral to St Michael's Church, a cross-community event organised by Dean Hall and Monsignor O'Reilly.

=== Charitable and civic activities ===
He served for thirty-six years on the committee of the Enniskillen Show, first as Chairman and subsequently as President. He was involved with the Riding for the Disabled Association (RDA), assisting with sessions, and served as President of the local branch. His father had been the first President of the Royal Forestry Society (RFS); Hamilton became Chairman of the Northern Ireland Division and later President of the RFS.

He served as Northern Ireland President of SSAFA (the Soldiers', Sailors', and Airmen's Families Association) and was President of the Ulster Branch of the Irish Guards Association, annually taking the salute at the St Patrick's Day parade. In 2007, he and his wife took part in the inaugural Help for Heroes bicycle ride from London to Paris, cycling between 80 and 100 miles per day to raise funds for rehabilitation facilities at Headley Court.

He and his wife regularly opened the gardens of their home at Killyreagh House to raise funds for local and regional organisations, and he was an active supporter of Marie Curie and the Save Our Acute Services (SOAS) campaign, which advocated for the retention of hospital services in the county. He was a member of the church vestry at Derryvullen South.

== Marriage and issue ==
In 1982, Hamilton married Catherine Janet Faulkner, a niece of Lord Faulkner of Downpatrick. The couple moved to Killyreagh House, Tamlaght, in 1988, a Georgian house overlooking a wildflower meadow and woodlands, with views of the Florencecourt hills. They had two children.

== Death ==
Hamilton died at his home in Enniskillen on 27 April 2026, aged 86, surrounded by his family. A funeral service was held at St Macartin's Cathedral, Enniskillen, on 10 May 2026. He was survived by his wife, his two children, and four grandchildren.

== See also ==
- Duke of Abercorn
- James Hamilton, 5th Duke of Abercorn
