= Kathleen Hamilton, Duchess of Abercorn =

British aristocrat and courtier (1905–1990)

Her Grace The Duchess of Abercorn GCVO
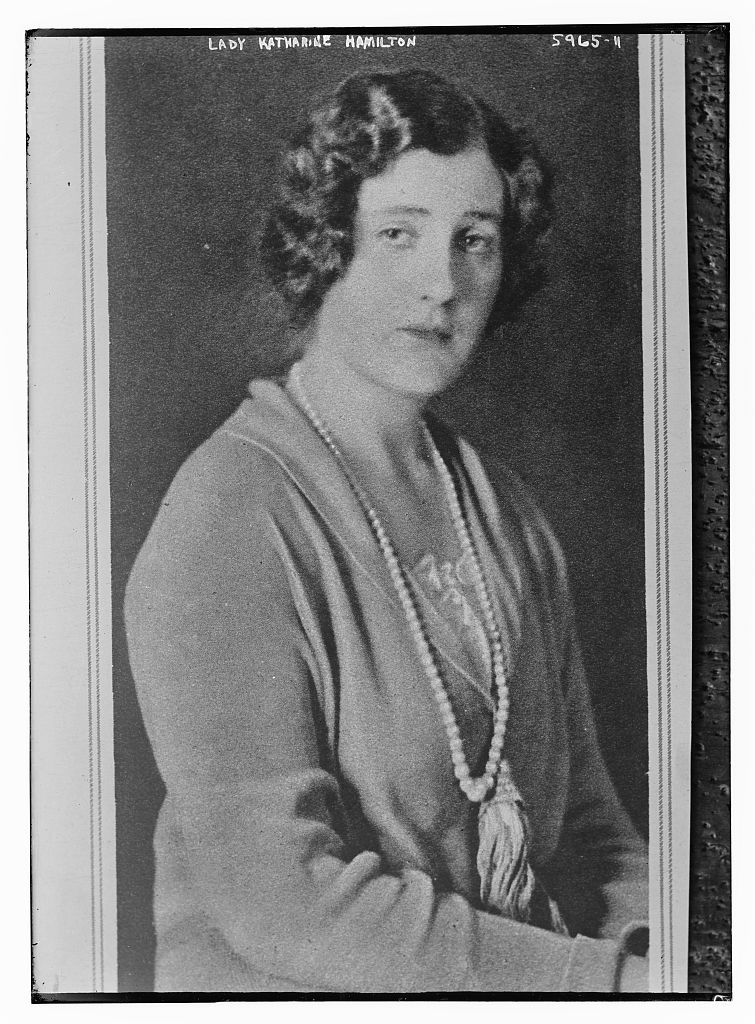

Personal details
- Born: Hon. Mary Kathleen Crichton; 8 July 1905 Paddington, London, England
- Died: 2 February 1990 (aged 84) Baronscourt, Newtownstewart, Northern Ireland
- Spouse: James Hamilton, 4th Duke of Abercorn (m. 1928; died 1979)
- Children: Lady Moyra Campbell; James Hamilton, 5th Duke of Abercorn; Lord Claud Anthony Hamilton
- Parent(s): Henry Crichton, Viscount Crichton; Lady Mary Grosvenor
- Occupation: Mistress of the Robes to Queen Elizabeth the Queen Mother

Katherine Hamilton, Duchess of Abercorn, GCVO (born Hon. Mary Katherine Crichton; 8 July 1905 – 2 February 1990) was a British aristocrat and courtier who served as Mistress of the Robes to Queen Elizabeth the Queen Mother from 1964 until her death in 1990.

The Duchess was the elder of the two surviving children born to Henry Crichton, Viscount Crichton, son of John Crichton, 4th Earl Erne, and Lady Mary Cavendish Grosvenor, daughter of Hugh Grosvenor, 1st Duke of Westminster.

The Duchess was married in St Martin-in-the-Fields, on 9 February 1928, to James Hamilton (at that time Marquess of Hamilton), who succeeded his father as 4th Duke of Abercorn in 1953. King George V was present at the wedding ceremony.

In 1956 she was appointed Honorary Colonel of the 351 (Ulster) Battalion of the Territorial Army. She relinquished the appointment in 1961 on its amalgamation, retaining the honorary rank of Colonel.

The Duchess served as Mistress of the Robes to Queen Elizabeth the Queen Mother from 1964 until her death.

She was invested as a Dame Commander of the Royal Victorian Order in 1969. In the 1982 Birthday Honours she was made a Dame Grand Cross of the order. In July 1980, the University of Ulster at Jordanstown gave her an honorary degree.

The Duchess died 2 February 1990.

Court offices
Preceded by The Duchess of Northumberland	Mistress of the Robes to Queen Elizabeth the Queen Mother; 1964 – 1990	Succeeded by —
