= Lord Lieutenant of Tyrone =

Ceremonial officer in Tyrone, Northern Ireland

This is a list of people who have served as Lord Lieutenant of County Tyrone.

There were lieutenants of counties in Ireland until the reign of James II, when they were renamed governors. The office of Lord Lieutenant was recreated on 23 August 1831.

== Governors ==
- Thomas Knox, 1st Viscount Northland: –1818
- John Hamilton, 1st Marquess of Abercorn: –1818
- Somerset Lowry-Corry, 2nd Earl Belmore: –1831
- Du Pré Alexander, 2nd Earl of Caledon: –1831
- Charles Gardiner, 1st Earl of Blessington: –1829 (died 1829)

== Lord lieutenants ==
- Du Pré Alexander, 2nd Earl of Caledon: 17 October 1831 – 8 April 1839
- Francis Caulfeild, 2nd Earl of Charlemont: June 1839 – 26 December 1863
- James Caulfeild, 3rd Earl of Charlemont: 3 March 1864 – 12 January 1892
- Somerset Lowry-Corry, 4th Earl Belmore: 10 February 1892 – 6 April 1913
- Sir Edward Archdale, 1st Baronet: 5 August 1913 – 4 July 1916
- James Hamilton, 3rd Duke of Abercorn: 26 April 1917 – 1945
- James Ponsonby Galbraith: 25 September 1945 – 1 October 1950
- James Hamilton, 4th Duke of Abercorn: 8 January 1951 – 1979
- John Hamilton-Stubber: 1 March 1979 – 3 October 1986
- James Hamilton, 5th Duke of Abercorn: 20 March 1987 – 4 July 2009
- Robert Lowry Scott: 5 July 2009 – 17 June 2026
- William James Baxter: 15 October 2026– present

== Deputy lieutenants ==
A deputy lieutenant of Tyrone is commissioned by the Lord Lieutenant of Tyrone. Deputy lieutenants support the work of the lord-lieutenant. There can be several deputy lieutenants at any time, depending on the population of the county. Their appointment does not terminate with the changing of the lord-lieutenant, but they usually retire at age 75.

=== 21st century ===
- 24 March 2010: Countess Castle Stewart
