= Cynthia Spencer, Countess Spencer =

British countess (1897–1972)

The Right Honourable The Countess Spencer DCVO OBE
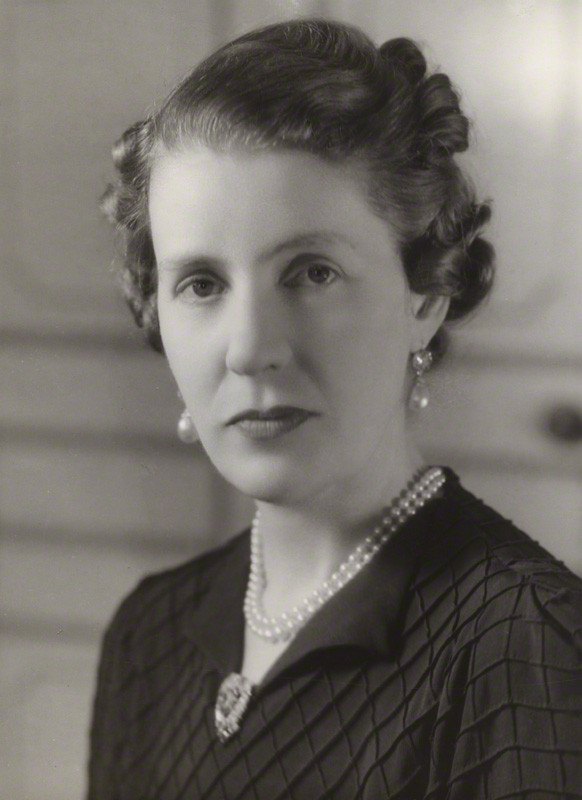
- Spencer in 1939
- Born: Lady Cynthia Elinor Beatrix Hamilton; 16 August 1897; London, England
- Died: 4 December 1972 (aged 75); Althorp, Northamptonshire, England
- Spouse: Albert Spencer, 7th Earl Spencer (m. 1919)
- Children: Lady Anne Wake-Walker; John Spencer, 8th Earl Spencer
- Parents: James Hamilton, 3rd Duke of Abercorn (father); Lady Rosalind Bingham (mother)
- Family: Hamilton (by birth); Spencer (by marriage)

Cynthia Elinor Beatrix Spencer, Countess Spencer (née Hamilton; 16 August 1897 – 4 December 1972) was a British peeress and the paternal grandmother of Diana, Princess of Wales.

== Life and family ==
Lady Cynthia Hamilton was the daughter of James Hamilton, Marquess of Hamilton, later 3rd Duke of Abercorn (30 November 1869 – 12 September 1953) and Lady Rosalind Cecilia Caroline Bingham (26 February 1869 – 18 January 1958).

Hamilton married Viscount Althorp on 26 February 1919 at St James's Church, Piccadilly, London.

They had two children:

- Lady Anne Spencer (4 August 1920 – 24 February 2020). In February 1944 she, an officer in the Women's Royal Naval Service, married Christopher Baldwin Hughes Wake-Walker, a Captain in the Royal Navy, at Westminster Abbey.
- Edward John Spencer, 8th Earl Spencer (24 January 1924 – 29 March 1992).

Lady Spencer was appointed a lady of the bedchamber to Queen Elizabeth in 1937. She continued in the role after Elizabeth became queen mother in 1952, and remained in post until her death.

She was the grandmother of Diana, Princess of Wales. Lady Spencer died at the Spencers' ancestral home, Althorp, of a brain tumour on 4 December 1972, aged 75. The Cynthia Spencer Hospice in Northampton is named in her memory.

Lady Spencer was little known outside court and local circles until, twenty years after her death, Andrew Morton wrote that the Princess of Wales "believes that her grandmother looks after her in the spirit world."

== Honours ==
- 4 June 1943: Officer of the Most Excellent Order of the British Empire (OBE)
- 1 June 1953: Dame Commander of the Royal Victorian Order (DCVO)
- 2 June 1953: Recipient of the Queen Elizabeth II Coronation Medal
