= James Hamilton, 8th Earl of Abercorn =

18th-century Scottish and Irish peer

The Right Honourable The Earl of Abercorn
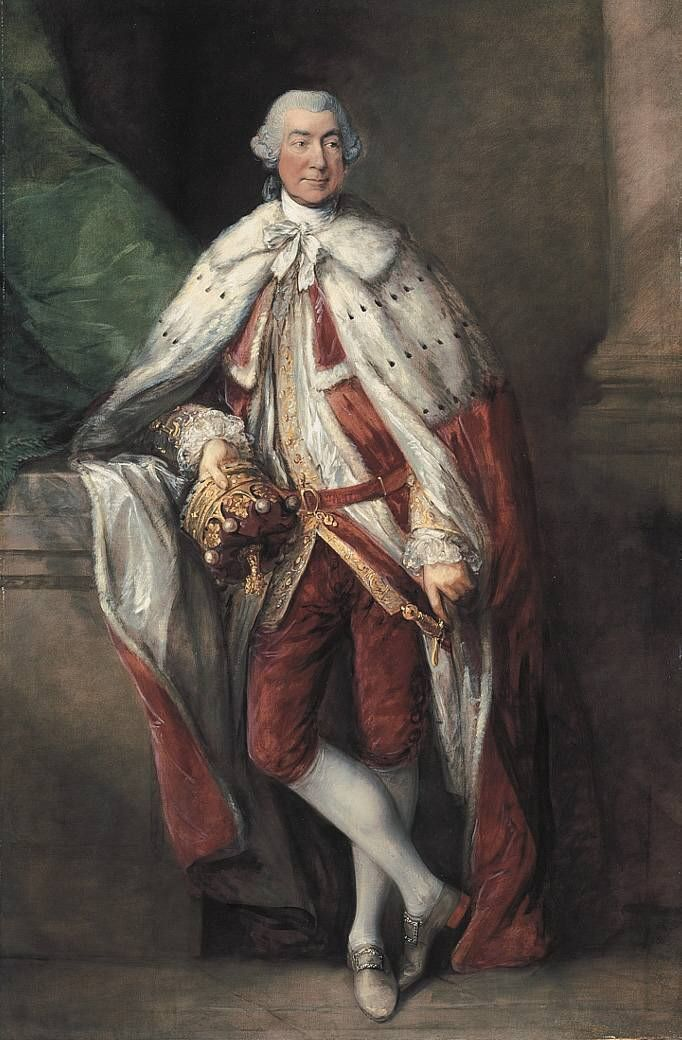
- portrait by Thomas Gainsborough
- Born: 22 October 1712; London, England
- Died: 9 October 1789 (aged 76); Boroughbridge, England
- Education: Christ Church, Oxford
- Father: James Hamilton, 7th Earl of Abercorn

James Hamilton, 8th Earl of Abercorn PC (Ire) (22 October 1712 – 9 October 1789), styled Lord Paisley from 1734 to 1736, was an Anglo-Irish peer. He inherited large estates in Ireland, where he built a mansion, and re-acquired some of the family's ancestral lands in Scotland.

== Biography ==
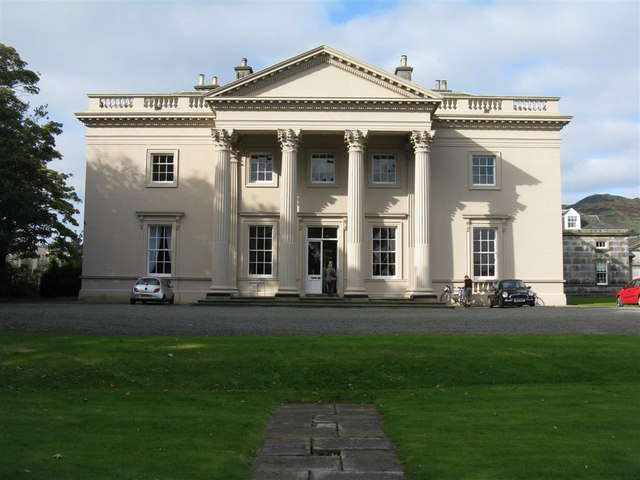
Duddingston House

The eldest son of James Hamilton, 7th Earl of Abercorn and Anne Plumer, he was born in Queen Square, London on 22 October 1712. He matriculated at Christ Church, Oxford on 10 October 1729. On 22 March 1736 he was summoned to the Irish House of Lords by writ of acceleration as Baron Mountcastle. He succeeded his father as Earl of Abercorn in 1744.

By the time of his succession, the family's lands in Scotland had long since been dissipated. He began to reassemble them, purchasing the feudal barony of Duddingston in Edinburgh in 1745. He was sworn of the Privy Council of Ireland on 20 April 1756, where he had inherited extensive lands. In 1760 he commissioned Sir William Chambers to design the classical Duddingston House. From 1761 to 1787, he was a Tory Scottish representative peer. Horace Walpole noted that Abercorn was exceptionally laconic.

Abercorn continued to repurchase old family lands in Scotland, acquiring the lordship of Paisley in 1764 from Thomas Cochrane, 8th Earl of Dundonald.

He also had a seat at Witham, Essex, and built a great new house at Baronscourt in Ireland from 1779 to 1781. He was responsible for beginning the development of the new town of Paisley in 1779, across the River Cart from the old town.

His principal residence was Duddingston House near Edinburgh.

In the Lords, Abercorn opposed the 1766 repeal of the Stamp Act, and the East India Bill put forth by the Fox–North coalition in 1783. On 24 August 1786, he was created Viscount Hamilton, in the Peerage of Great Britain, with a special remainder to his nephew John James.

The Committee for Privileges, on 13 February 1787, set a precedent by resolving that this vacated his seat as a representative peer for Scotland. Abercorn died at Boroughbridge on 9 October 1789 while travelling, and was buried at Paisley Abbey. All his titles devolved upon his nephew John James.

== Notes ==
Peerage of Scotland
Preceded by James Hamilton	Earl of Abercorn; 1744–1789	Succeeded by John Hamilton
Peerage of Great Britain
New creation	Viscount Hamilton; 1786–1789	Succeeded by John Hamilton
Peerage of Ireland
Preceded by James Hamilton	Viscount Strabane; 1744–1789	Succeeded by John Hamilton
Preceded by James Hamilton	Baron Mountcastle (writ in acceleration); 1736–1789	Succeeded by John Hamilton
