= Duddingston =

Area of Edinburgh, Scotland

Coordinates: 55°56′29.89″N 3°8′48.23″W

- A view of Duddingston Village from the nearby loch

- Location within the City of Edinburgh council area Location within Scotland
- OS grid reference: NT299729
- Council area: City of Edinburgh
- Lieutenancy area: Edinburgh
- Country: Scotland
- Sovereign state: United Kingdom
- Post town: EDINBURGH
- Postcode district: EH8, EH15
- Dialling code: 0131
- Police: Scotland
- Fire: Scottish
- Ambulance: Scottish
- UK Parliament: Edinburgh East
- Scottish Parliament: Edinburgh Eastern

Duddingston is a district of Edinburgh, Scotland; comprising a neighbourhood, conservation area and the historic Duddingston Village. The area is situated at the foot of Arthur’s Seat, within Holyrood Park and beside Duddingston Loch. First recorded in the 12th century, the area developed from an early medieval settlement into a centre for coal mining, salt production and weaving; today it is defined by its well-preserved historic core around Duddingston Kirk. Other landmarks include the Sheep Heid Inn, Dr Neil’s Garden and Jock Tamson’s Gairden, the latter for which Monty Don is a patron.

== Origins and etymology ==
The estate wherein Duddingston Village now lies was first recorded in lands granted to the Tironensian monks of Kelso Abbey by David I of Scotland between 1136 and 1147, and is described as stretching from the Crag (from Craggenmarf, an old name for Arthur's Seat) to the Magdalene Bridge at Eastfield. Herbert, the first Abbot at Kelso granted the lands of Easter and Wester Duddingston to Reginald de Bosco for an annual rent of 10 merks.

This land grant included the settlement known by the name of Treverlen or Traverlin, in the western part of it; this being the oldest known name of the village and estates that eventually became known as Duddingston. There are several possibilities for the etymology of "Treverlen":

- "tref + gwr + lên" meaning "place of the learned man"
- "tref + y + glyn" with lenition following the definite article, meaning "place of the learned women"
- "tre + war + lyn" meaning "the farm at or on the loch"
- "traefor llyn" meaning "settlement by the lake (loch) of reeds and/or rushes"

All these names originate in the Celtic Brythonic languages, which pre-date the use of the Gaelic or Saxon tongues in Scotland, suggesting that they may go back to the time of some of the earliest settlements on Arthur's Seat. The last two names, in particular, fit well as a possible name for the Celtic crannog settlement which stood in the southernmost corner of Duddingston Loch.

The last Celtic owner of the Treverlen estates is said to have been Uviet the White who owned it from at least 1090 onwards. By 1128, though, at the founding of Holyrood Abbey, the lands of Arthur's Seat seem to have become divided between the Royal Demesne and the estates of Treverlen belonging to Uviet the White. For confirmation of what passed in 1128 at the forming of Holyrood Abbey and the passing of the lands to Kelso Abbey, we can look to the later "Charter of Confirmation, Granted to the Monks of Kelso of King Malcolm IV". Malcolm IV of Scotland inherited the throne from his grandfather David I of Scotland, and was perhaps called upon to confirm many such gifts of land in case of later disputes. This he did, in the above-mentioned charter, confirming the previously given entitlement of

Traverlin, with its due bounds, as Vineth fully and freely possessed and enjoyed it, with all the easements of the adjoining strother (marsh), which is called Cameri; and the Crag of the same village

to Kelso Abbey. Malcolm goes on to state that in his grandfather's time Alfwyn (perhaps the saxonised form of Uviet, or one of his descendants), Abbot of Halyrude (Holyrood Abbey) and Ernald, Abbot of Kelso, came to an agreement concerning a dispute between them over The Crag, which allowed for the lands of The Crag and Traverlin to pass to the church of Kelso, in exchange for the ten-pounds-lands they had in "Hardiggasthorn, near Northamtun".

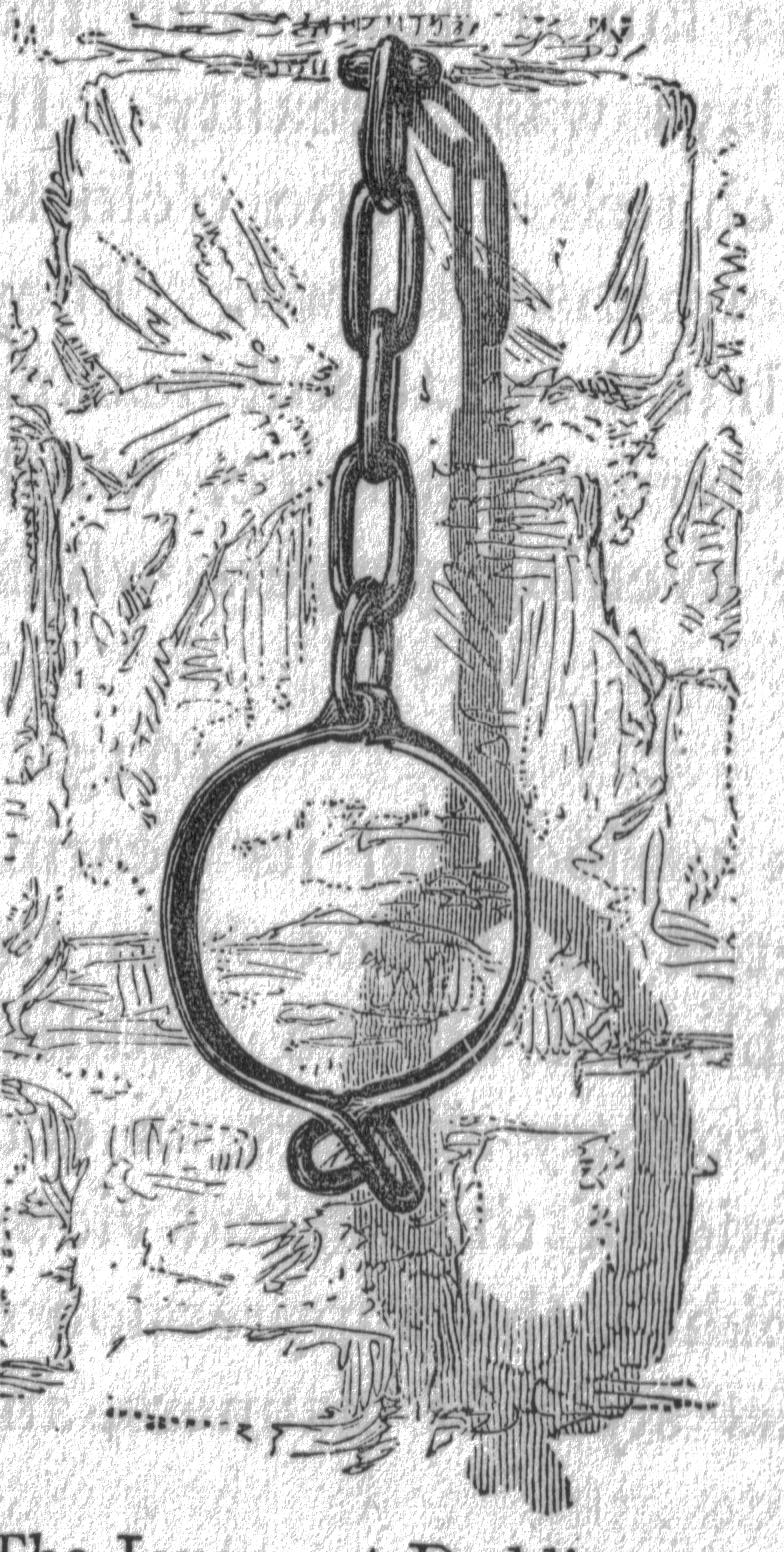
The old Jougs at Duddingston Kirk in 1885.

The name was superseded during the thirteenth and fourteenth centuries by "Dodinestun" from "Dodin’s Estate". This name change came about just after the lands and estates were given to Kelso Abbey by David I. The Abbey quickly feued the estate to one Dodin de Berwic, evidently, from his name, an Anglo-Norman knight. Apparently, then, it was Dodin who changed the name of the settlement, as by 1150 he was referring to himself as "Dodin of Dodinestoun". (Dodin's toun or farm place). This last may be slightly misleading, though, as there was a toft (a homestead with attached arable land) near Berwick-Upon-Tweed, also referred to as Dodin's Town, with which he is quite likely to have had connections. However, it seems likely that the names are connected through branches of the same Norman family. Thereafter the village is often, though not always, referred to as Duddingston, with quite a wide range of spellings. For instance, from heraldic sources we are told that in May 1290 Edward I granted a protection against proceedings for debts to William de Dodingstone, burgess of Edinburgh. Also, with quite a different spelling, but six years later, we are told the name is that of a locality near Edinburgh, and Eleyne de Duddynggeston, of that county, swore fealty to Edward I.

The kirk which was built on the newly gifted lands went by the name Duddingston Kirk, but the name Treverlen still survived into the next century as the parish name, being confirmed as such in a list of 13 parishes belonging to Kelso in 1200, which leads one to suspect there had been a kirk on the site prior to Dodin's ownership. The name has now been given to the new park built on the site of the former Portobello High School and St John's Primary School.

== History ==
In January 1542, James V paid David Murray of Balvaird £400 Scots for land at Duddingston which was added to Holyrood Park. Cassells says the village was a centre of weaving in the 18th century where "over 40 looms" were in production on The Loan, creating a coarse linen called "Duddingston hardings".

Duddingston Loch was used for ice-skating and curling, even boasting a curling house, for several centuries. The loch provided the setting for Henry Raeburn's painting of The Skating Minister, painted in the 1790s, as well as the less famous but very atmospheric painting by Charles Lees called Skaters on Duddingston Loch by Moonlight.

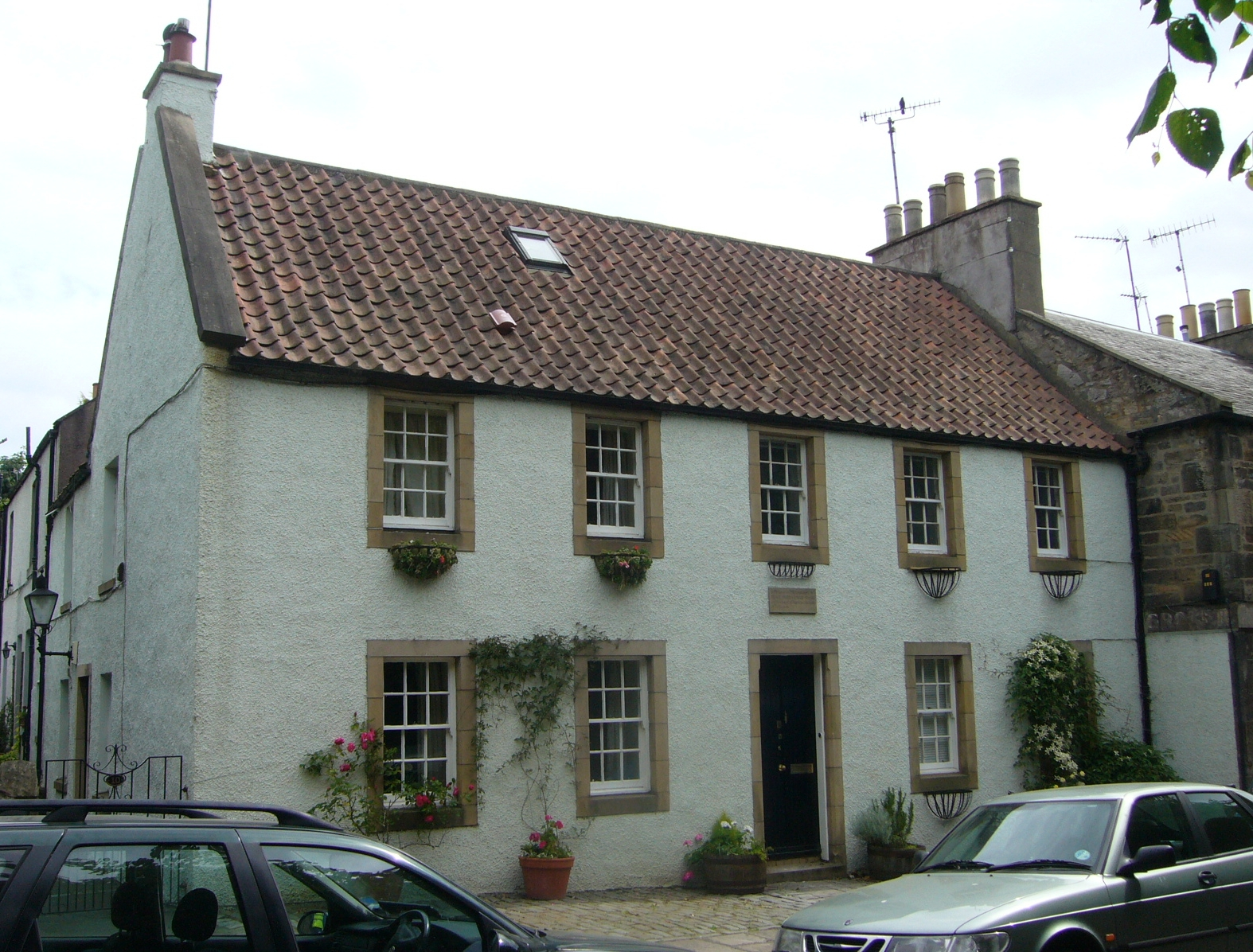
'Bonnie Prince Charlie House'

Bonnie Prince Charlie held a council of war in a house ("then thatched now tiled") in the village, shortly before the Battle of Prestonpans in 1745. In the same year, James Hamilton, 8th Earl of Abercorn purchased the Duddingston Estate from the Duke of Argyll. Lord Abercorn commissioned the architect Sir William Chambers to design Duddingston House in the Palladian style, and this was completed by 1768. Dr. James Tytler (1745–1804), author, balloonist and encyclopedist, lived in Duddingston. Robert Burns knew him, describing him as a mortal who wandered the precincts of Edinburgh in leaky shoes, a sky-lighted hat and unlikely breeches, who yet was responsible for at least three quarters of Elliot's Encyclopædia Britannica. In 1774 he was living on the Holyrood Abbey "sanctuary lands" to avoid his creditors. After his wife left him and their children in 1775, he was known thereafter to be co-habiting with at least one, if not two women, one of them a Duddingston washerwoman. This circumstance eventually led to his flight from Scottish justice for the crime of bigamy in 1788, when he left Duddingston, and both women, to remove himself to Berwick. Whilst living in Duddingston he did build a printing press, and turned out further copies of the encyclopedia, and other more successful publications, but he was a poor businessman and never seemed to benefit from these and other successes. Sadly, even his attempt at ballooning in 1784 was something of a debacle. He was finally able to rise to a height of 105 feet (32 m) and descend again, which qualified him as Britain's first balloonist, but his success at the time was overshadowed by other more popular balloonists.

The former Home House in Old Church Lane was built in 1820 and is a category B Listed building that was formerly a children's home for Church of Scotland missionary children.

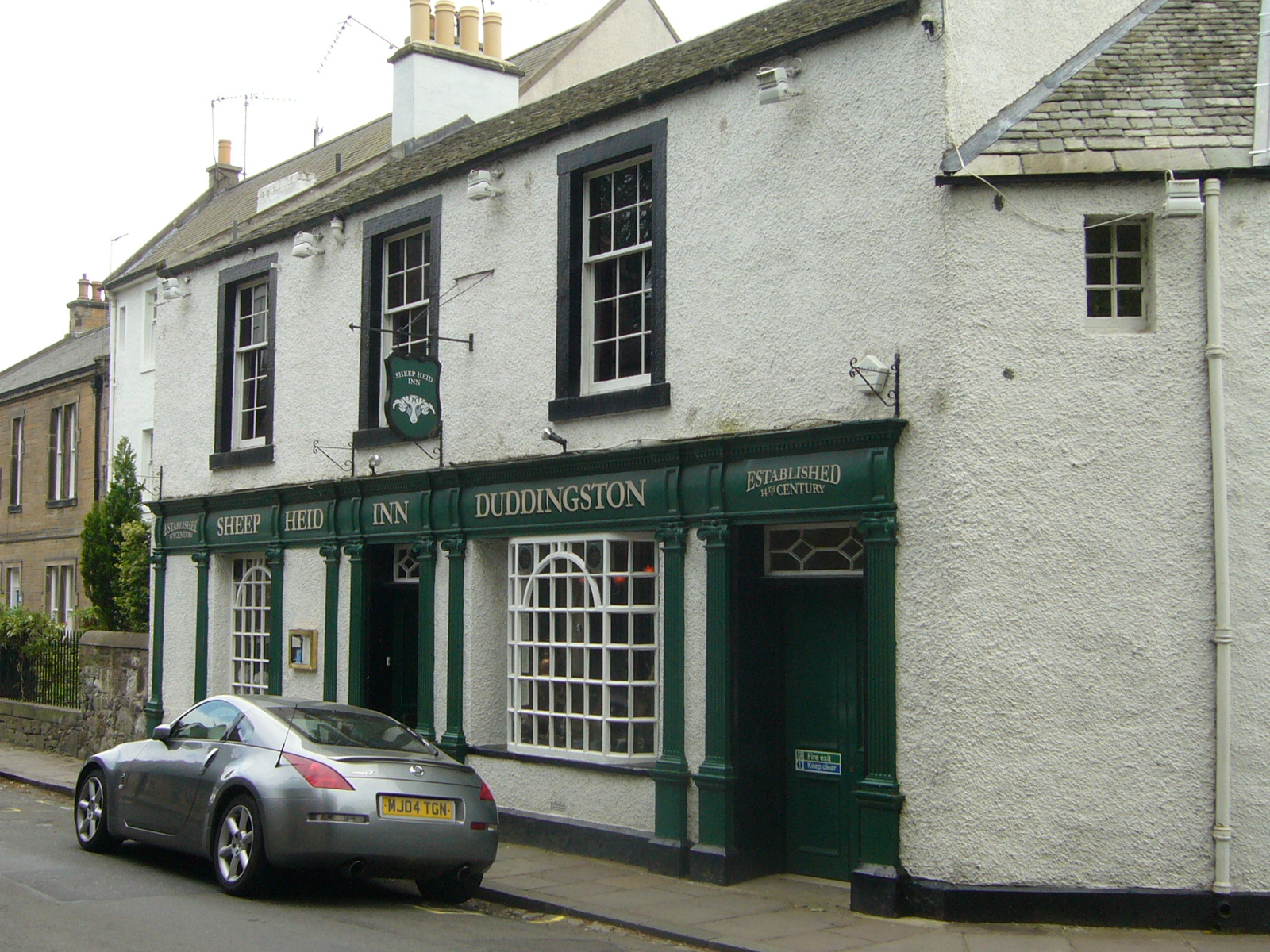
The "Sheep's Heid", reputedly Scotland's oldest pub (2009)

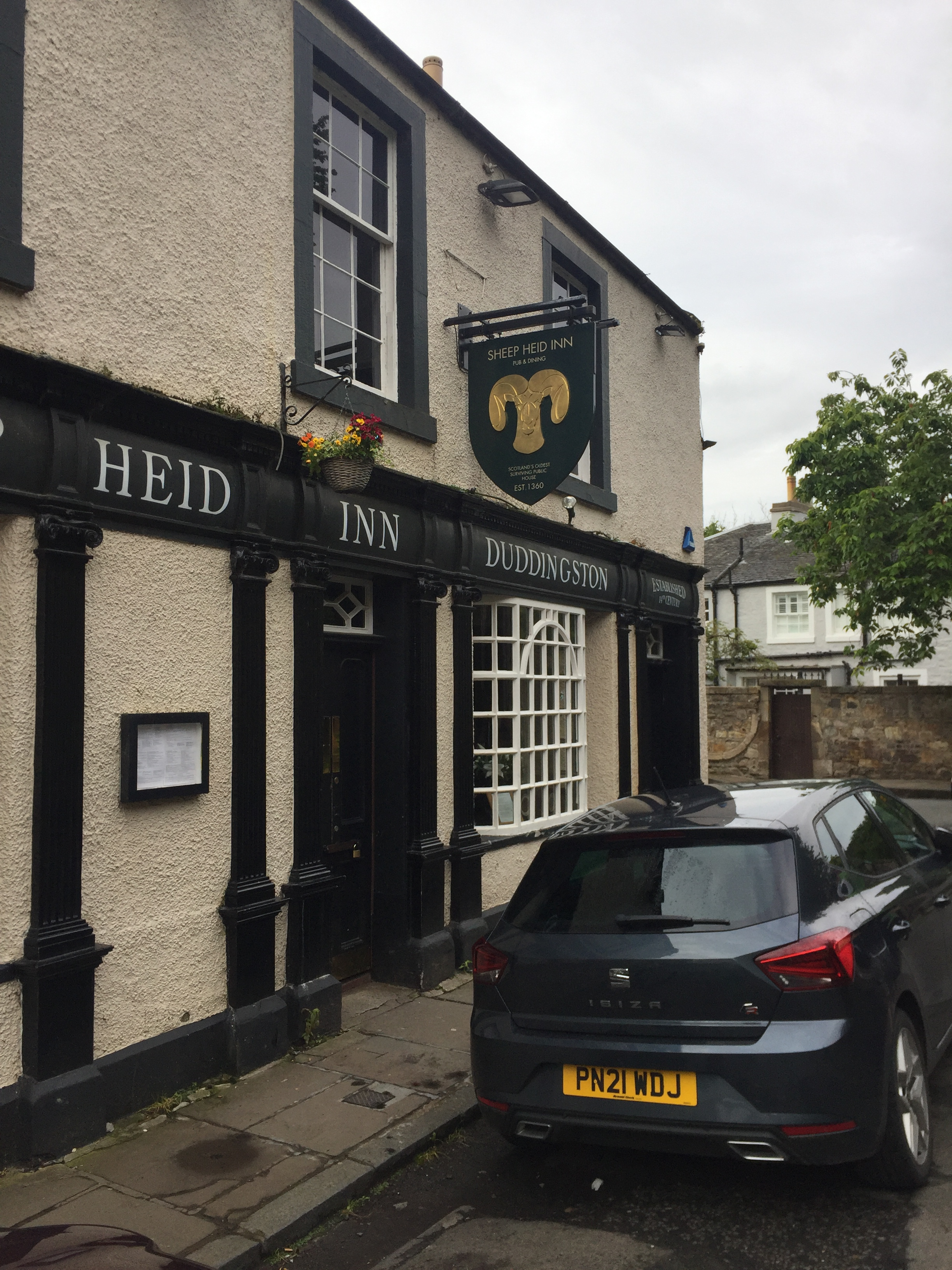
The same pub in 2024

Between 1998 and 2016 Duddingston Kirk Gardens, and sometimes the kirk itself, were used as an Edinburgh Festival Fringe venue by Theatre Alba, the theatre company founded by Charles Nowosielski and Richard Cherns. Its first production there was a revival of Netta B. Reid's A Shepherd Beguiled, which was performed again there in 2016. In 2002, the company introduced work for children under the direction of Clunie Mackenzie and Keith Hutcheon. Between 2003 and 2018, Nowosielski produced four Passion Plays, which were performed on Easter Sundays at locations around the village.

== Local attractions ==
The Sheep Heid Inn, often referred to as the "Sheep's Heid", is said to be Scotland's oldest pub, dating from 1360 although the core of the current building is 18th century. It is named after a snuff box either embellished with, or in the shape of a ram's head presented to the landlord by King James VI in 1580.

Since 1923, the loch has been a wildlife reserve, managed by the Scottish Wildlife Trust. It contains a variety of wildfowl and reedbeds. The loch is part of Holyrood Park which is owned by the Scottish Ministers. The Scottish Wildlife Trust purchased the adjacent land at Bawsinch in 1971 and expanded the bird sanctuary into this area.

Dr Neil's Garden is located between Duddingston Kirk and the Loch. Doctors Andrew and Nancy Neil were awarded the Queen Elizabeth, the Queen Mother Medal by the Royal Caledonian Horticultural Society for their practice and research in medicinal plants.

Duddingston Kirk dates largely from the 12th century, though it is believed a place of worship existed on the site even earlier. The present building was substantially rebuilt in 1631 and again in the 19th century, retaining many historic features including its crow-stepped gables and distinctive bell-cot. For centuries the Kirk was the spiritual heart of the village, serving generations of local families and landowners. It remains an active parish church today and is closely associated with several notable Scottish figures, including Dr Henry Duncan, founder of the world’s first savings bank.

Bonnie Prince Charlie’s Cottage, located near the Kirk, is traditionally associated with Charles Edward Stuart, who is said to have stayed there briefly during the Jacobite Rising of 1745. While documentary evidence is limited, the cottage forms part of the strong local tradition connecting Duddingston to the Jacobite cause. The modest 17th-century building reflects the village’s rural past and adds to the sense of historic continuity around the Kirk and Loch. Today, it stands as a reminder of Duddingston’s place within wider national events during one of Scotland’s most turbulent periods
