= Duddingston House =

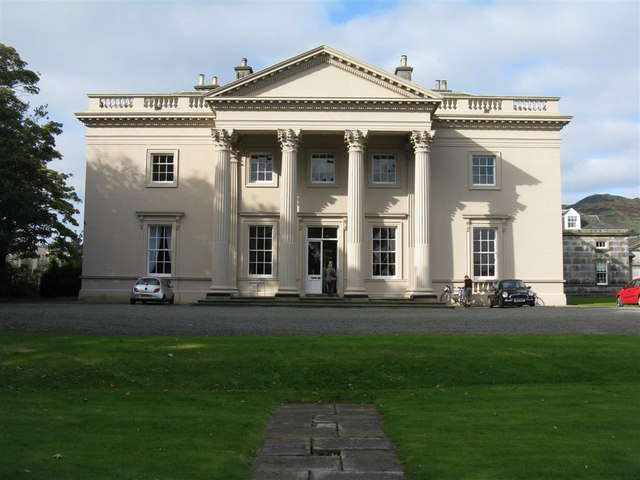
- Duddingston House, entrance front

- Location within Edinburgh
- 55.9391°N 3.1369°W
- Location: Duddingston, Edinburgh, Scotland

History
- Built: 1763–1768
- Built for: James Hamilton, 8th Earl of Abercorn

Site notes
- Architect: Sir William Chambers
- Architectural style: Palladian

Listed Building – Category A
- Designated: 14 July 1966
- Reference no.: LB28065

Inventory of Gardens and Designed Landscapes in Scotland
- Official name: Duddingston House
- Criteria: Architectural
- Designated: 30 June 1987
- Reference no.: GDL00147

Duddingston House is an 18th-century mansion in Edinburgh, Scotland, located south-east of the village of Duddingston. It was built in the 1760s for James Hamilton, 8th Earl of Abercorn, and was designed by Sir William Chambers. It is now protected as a category A listed building, and the grounds of the house are included in the Inventory of Gardens and Designed Landscapes in Scotland, the national listing of significant gardens.

== History ==
The lands of Duddingston were purchased by James Hamilton, 8th Earl of Abercorn (1712–1789), in 1745 from the Duke of Argyll. During the Jacobite rising of 1745, Bonnie Prince Charlie's cavalry camped in the park, before the Battle of Prestonpans. In 1760, Lord Abercorn commissioned Sir William Chambers (1723–1796) to design a modest new house, which was constructed between 1763 and 1768. The total cost of the house and pleasure grounds, laid out by Robert Robinson in the style of Capability Brown, was around £30,000.

After Lord Abercorn's death in 1789, the estate passed to his heirs but the house was let. Its tenants were aristocratic including Francis Rawdon-Hastings, 1st Marquess of Hastings who rented the property for many years and held an infamous garden fete in June 1805 inviting 300 of the Scottish nobility.

The Benhar Coal Mining Company bought a large part of the 1,500-acre (610 ha) estate in the 1880s, and in 1894 Duddingston Golf Club was developed in the grounds. Holyrood High School was built in the park in the 1960s, to the west of the house.

== Restoration ==
By the 1950s the house was in poor repair, and in 1959 it was bought, along with 9 acres (3.6 ha), by a Mr E. Gladstone, who restored the house and opened it as a hotel in 1963. The house was again in disrepair in the 1980s. In the 1990s the stables and service block courtyard of the house were converted into town houses, while the main house was restored by the Burrell Company as offices.
