= Sheep Heid Inn =

Public house in Duddingston, Edinburgh, Scotland

Coordinates: 55°56′31″N 3°08′55″W

The Sheep Heid Inn
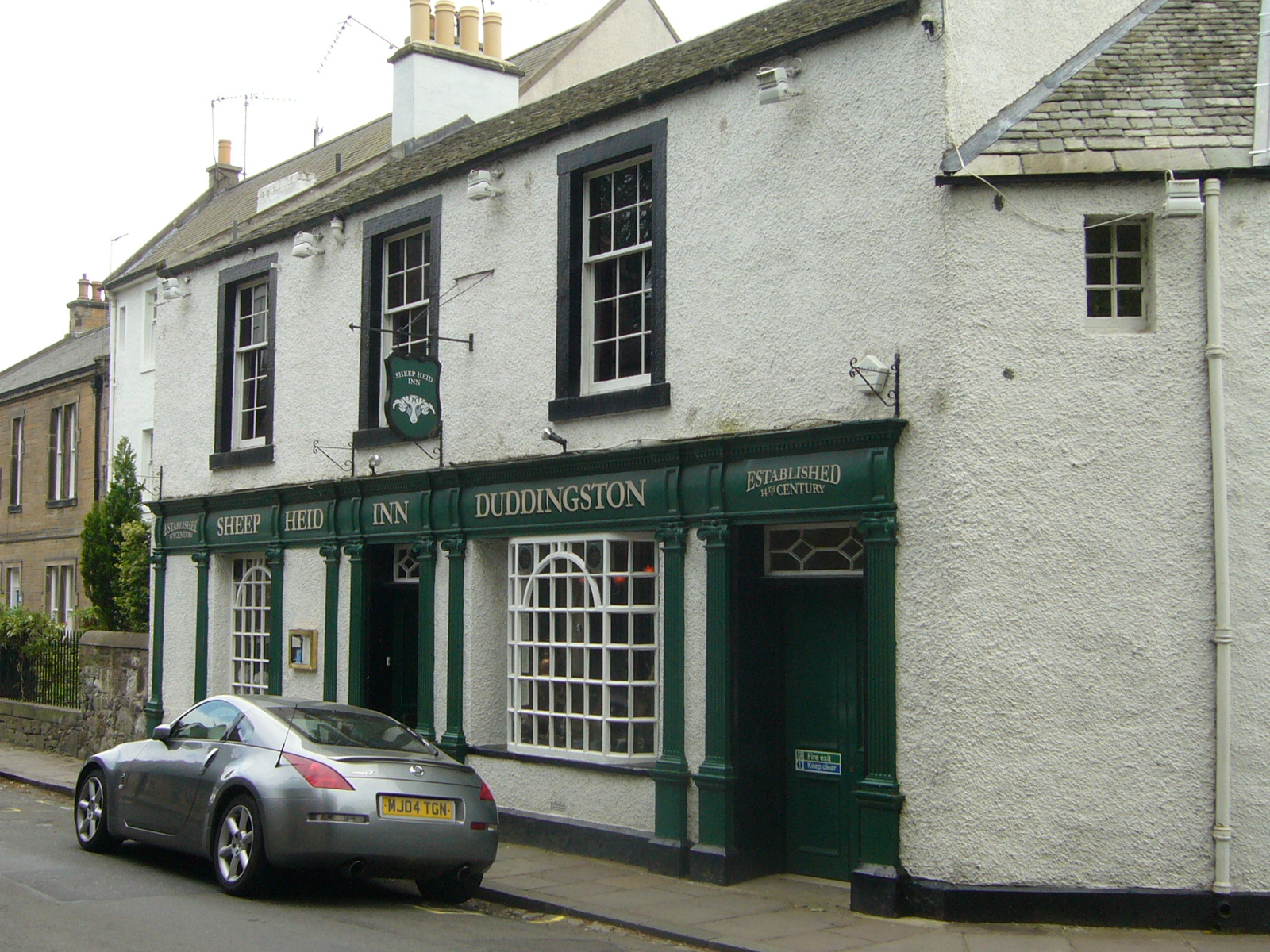
- Sheep Heid Inn, Duddingston.

- Location within Edinburgh
- Etymology: Probably following the royal gift in 1580 of an ornate ram's head snuff box, given by King James VI of Scotland.

General information
- Location: 43–45 The Causeway, Edinburgh EH15 3QA
- Opened: c. 1360
- Owner: Mitchells & Butlers

Website
- https://www.thesheepheidedinburgh.co.uk

The Sheep Heid Inn is a public house in Duddingston, Edinburgh, Scotland. There has reputedly been an inn on this site since 1360, although the core of the current building appears to date from the 18th century with later additions and alterations. If the 1360 foundation date was proved correct it would make The Sheep Heid Inn perhaps the oldest surviving licensed premises in Edinburgh, if not Scotland.

Famous visitors to the pub include Mary, Queen of Scots, Robert Burns, Sir Walter Scott, Robert Louis Stevenson, Queen Elizabeth II, Paul Heaton and Kelly Clarkson.

== Origin of the name ==
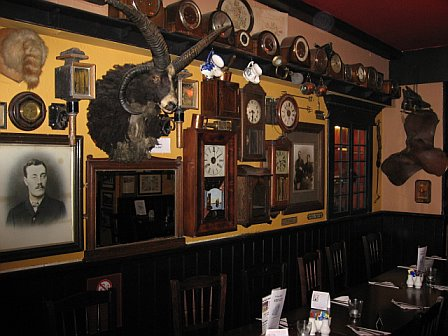
Bar of the Sheep Heid Inn

The origin of the pub's name is a matter of debate. From the Medieval period to early modern times, sheep were reared in Holyrood Park, a royal park beside Duddingston, and were slaughtered in Duddingston before being taken to the Fleshmarket in Edinburgh's Old Town. There being no great demand for the heads (Scots: heids), the residents of Duddingston village became renowned for their cooking. Two dishes in particular were widely known, sheep heid broth ("powsowdie") and singed sheep heid. The local fame of the latter was mentioned by Mrs Beeton in her famous cookery book. Until the late 19th century the use of these heads was so commonplace that the locals used the skulls as cobbles for their pathways.

Alternatively, and far more plausibly, its name probably came about following the royal gift in 1580 of an ornate ram's head snuff box, given by King James VI of Scotland. Duddingston village is exactly halfway between the royal residences of Craigmillar Castle and Holyrood Palace, and King James, like his mother Mary, Queen of Scots, was said to have stopped here many times and even played skittles in the courtyard behind the pub. As a mark of gratitude he presented the landlord with this highly unusual gift which remained on site for 300 years before being sold at auction to the Earl of Rosebery, whose descendants still possess it at their country seat of Dalmeny House. The pub has a 19th-century copy behind its bar. The greater likelihood is that the name was adopted by the pub to mark it apart from the many other taverns known to have existed in the locality.

== History ==
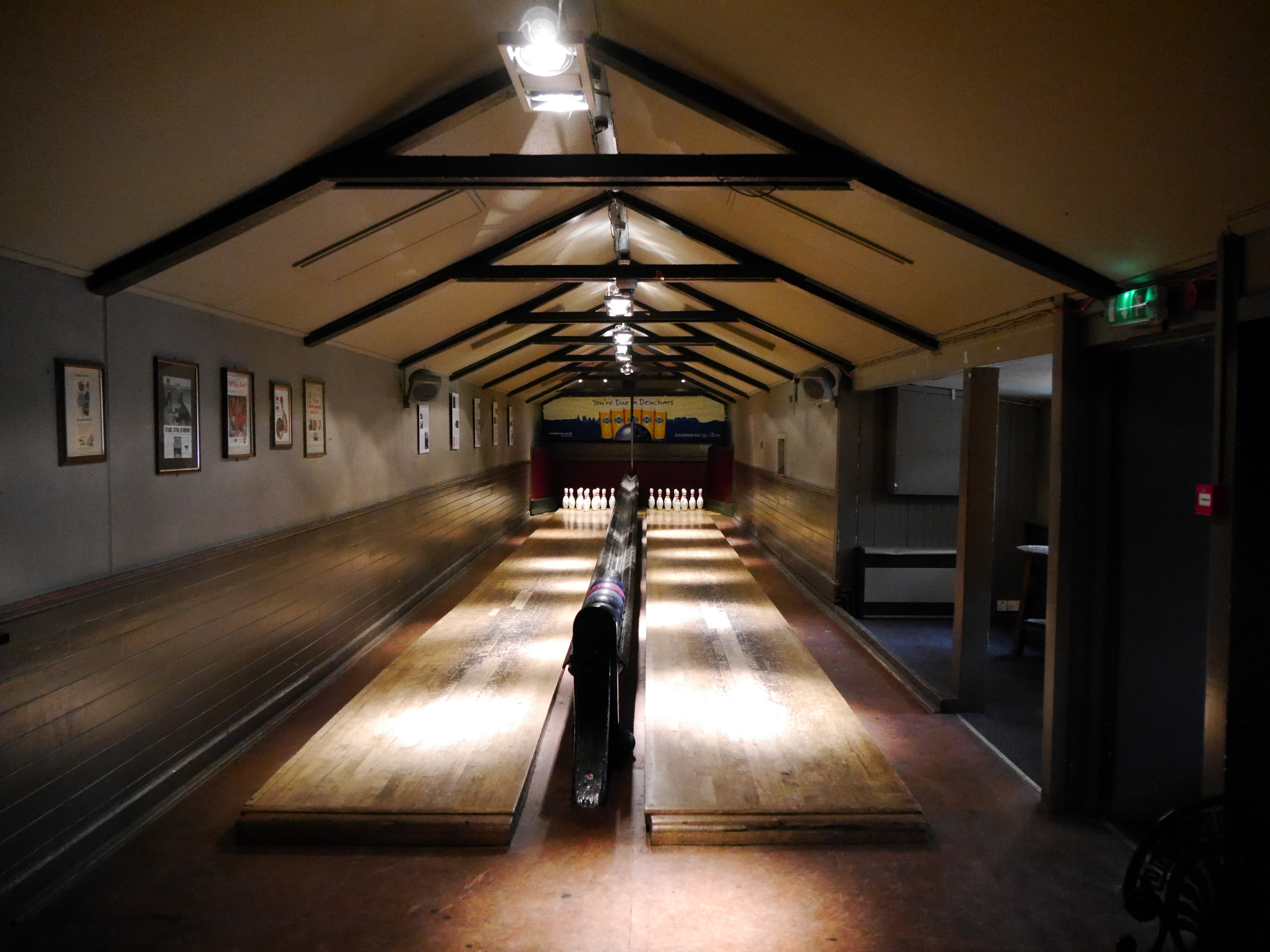
Skittle alley

The various factions of the Covenanting years were known to stop off as they passed to and fro, as did the Jacobite Army a century later. On this latter occasion, the army of Bonnie Prince Charlie was encamped at Duddingston for a month prior to the battle of Prestonpans.

The Sheep Heid Inn has an old fashioned bowling alley, built around 1880, reputedly the last such alley in Scotland. The Royal Company of Archers, the City Sheriffs, and the local regiments based at the nearby Piershill Barracks and Duddingston training camps, were all once regulars. The last of the old clubs to survive are the Trotters Club, founded in 1882, who still meet in the alley once a month.

In 2016, Queen Elizabeth II visited the pub after a day at Musselburgh Racecourse.

As of 2024, the pub is owned by Mitchells & Butlers.
