= James Hamilton, 5th Duke of Abercorn =

British nobleman, peer, and politician (born 1934)

His Grace The Duke of Abercorn KG
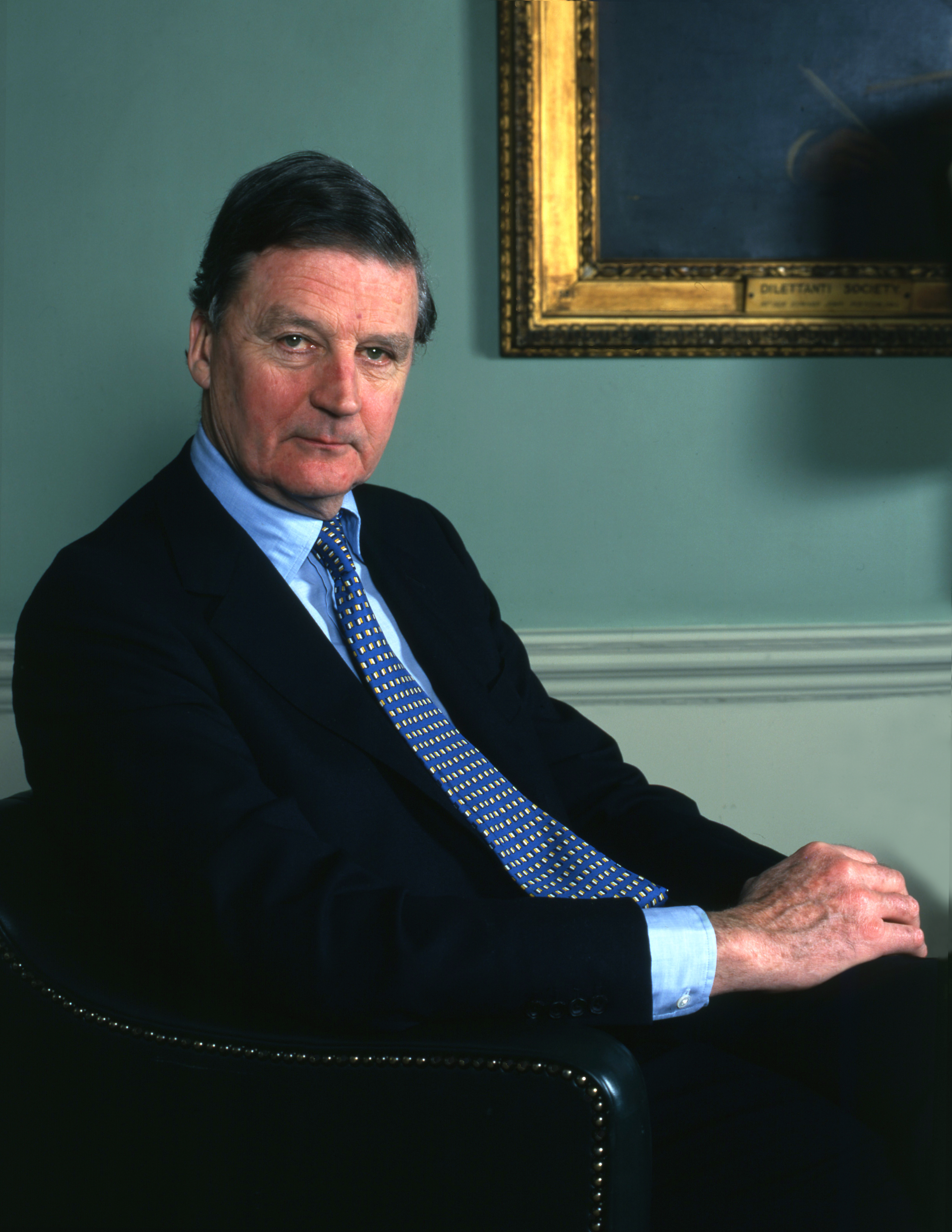
- Portrait by Allan Warren, 1990

Chancellor of the Order of the Garter
- In office 17 October 2012 – 18 June 2024
- Monarchs: Elizabeth II; Charles III
- Preceded by: The Lord Carrington
- Succeeded by: The Baroness Manningham-Buller

Lord Steward
- In office 2001–2009
- Monarch: Elizabeth II
- Preceded by: The Viscount Ridley
- Succeeded by: The Earl of Dalhousie

Lord Lieutenant of Tyrone
- In office 20 March 1987 – 4 July 2009
- Monarch: Elizabeth II
- Preceded by: John Hamilton-Stubber
- Succeeded by: Robert Lowry Scott

Member of the House of Lords
- In office 4 June 1979 – 11 November 1999
- Preceded by: James Hamilton, 4th Duke of Abercorn
- Succeeded by: Seat Abolished

Member of Parliament for Fermanagh and South Tyrone
- In office 15 October 1964 – 29 May 1970
- Preceded by: Lord Robert Grosvenor
- Succeeded by: Frank McManus

Personal details
- Born: 4 July 1934 (age 92)
- Party: Ulster Unionist
- Spouse: Alexandra Philips (m. 1966; died 2018)
- Children: James Hamilton, Marquess of Hamilton; Lady Sophia Hamilton; Lord Nicholas Hamilton
- Parents: James Hamilton, 4th Duke of Abercorn; The Hon. Kathleen Crichton
- Education: Royal Agricultural University

James Hamilton, 5th Duke of Abercorn (born 4 July 1934), styled Viscount Strabane until 1953 and Marquess of Hamilton between 1953 and 1979, is a British peer, courtier and politician.

Hamilton became the 5th Duke of Abercorn in the Peerage of Ireland on the death of his father, the 4th Duke, in 1979. He was an Ulster Unionist politician and served as Member of Parliament for Fermanagh and South Tyrone. He later served as Lord Steward of the Household to Elizabeth II. He was Chancellor of the Order of the Garter from 2012 until his retirement in 2024.

== Early life and family ==
Hamilton was born on 4 July 1934 to James Hamilton, Marquess of Hamilton, and The Hon. Kathleen Crichton. From birth, he held the courtesy title Viscount Strabane, until the death of his paternal grandfather, the 3rd Duke of Abercorn, in 1953, when he became Marquess of Hamilton, the title he held until the death of his father.

On 20 October 1966, the then Lord Hamilton married Alexandra Phillips, daughter of Lieutenant Colonel Harold Phillips and Georgina Wernher, herself the elder daughter and co-heiress of Sir Harold Wernher, 3rd Baronet, of Luton Hoo, Bedfordshire. Their wedding at Westminster Abbey was attended by members of the royal family, including Elizabeth II and the Queen Mother, and Prince Andrew was a page boy.

The Duke and Duchess of Abercorn had three children:

- James Harold Charles Hamilton, Marquess of Hamilton (born 19 August 1969); a godson of King Charles III; married Tanya Marie Nation on 7 May 2004, had issue:
  - James Alfred Nicholas Hamilton, Viscount Strabane (born 30 October 2005)
  - Lord Claud Douglas Harold Hamilton (born 12 December 2007)
- Lady Sophia Alexandra Hamilton (born 8 June 1973); married Anthony Loyd on 7 September 2002, divorced 2005, no issue
- Lord Nicholas Edward Hamilton (born 5 July 1979); married Tatiana Kronberg on 30 August 2009, had issue
  - Valentina Neva Hamilton (born 19 December 2010)

The Duke is a first cousin of the 8th Earl Spencer, father of Diana, Princess of Wales. He attended Diana's 1981 wedding to Prince Charles at St Paul's Cathedral.

== Career ==
Educated at Eton College and the Royal Agricultural College, in 1953 he was commissioned into the Grenadier Guards as Second Lieutenant Lord James Paisley, and then promoted to Lieutenant in 1955. He quit active service and was absorbed into the Regular Reserves a year later. In 1964 he became Ulster Unionist MP for Fermanagh and South Tyrone, succeeding his cousin, Lord Robert Grosvenor. He held his seat in the 1966 election but lost it to Frank McManus in 1970 by 1,423 votes. In 1970 he served as High Sheriff of Tyrone. In 1974 he joined the Ulster Defence Regiment, but left the regiment and remained in the British Army in the Volunteer List in 1980. From 1986 to 2009 he was the Lord Lieutenant of County Tyrone. In 1999, he was appointed a Knight Companion of the Order of the Garter. He was Colonel of the Irish Guards from 2000 to 2008. Additionally, he was appointed Lord Steward of the Household in 2001, serving until 2009.

He owns more than 15,000 acres (61 km^{2}). His seat is Baronscourt, near Newtownstewart, County Tyrone, Northern Ireland. The Dukedom of Abercorn is in the Peerage of Ireland and did not carry an entitlement to a seat in the House of Lords, but until 1999 the Duke was entitled to sit there under his subsidiary title Marquess of Abercorn, in the Peerage of Great Britain. He was appointed Chancellor of the Order of the Garter on 17 October 2012, and retired from that office on 18 June 2024.

In 1987, he served as a judge in Prince Edward's charity television special The Grand Knockout Tournament.

== Arms ==
Coat of arms of James Hamilton, 5th Duke of Abercorn, KG
Coronet A Coronet of a Duke Crest Out of a Ducal Coronet Or an Oak Tree proper fructed and penetrated through the stem transversely by a Frame-Saw proper framed Gold the blade inscribed with the word "Through" Escutcheon Quarterly: 1st and 4th, Gules three Cinquefoils pierced Ermine (Hamilton); 2nd and 3rd, Argent a Lymphad with one mast the sail furled and oars out Sable (Arran) Supporters On either side an Antelope Argent horned unguled ducally gorged hoofed and the Chain reflexed over the back Or Motto Sola Nobilitas Virtus (Virtue is the only nobility) Orders Order of the Garter Banner The banner of the Duke of Abercorn's arms used as Knight Companion of the Garter depicted at St George's Chapel.

Parliament of the United Kingdom
Preceded by Lord Robert Grosvenor	Member of Parliament for Fermanagh and South Tyrone; 1964–1970	Succeeded by Frank McManus
Court offices
Preceded by The Viscount Ridley	Lord Steward; 2001–2009	Succeeded by The Earl of Dalhousie
Military offices
Preceded by The Grand Duke of Luxembourg	Colonel of the Irish Guards; 2000–2008	Succeeded by Sir Sebastian Roberts
Honorary titles
Preceded by John Hamilton-Stubber	Lord Lieutenant of Tyrone; 1986–2009	Succeeded by Robert Lowry Scott
Preceded by The Lord Carrington	Chancellor of the Order of the Garter; 2012–2024	Succeeded by The Baroness Manningham-Buller
Peerage of Ireland
Preceded by James Hamilton	Duke of Abercorn; 1979–present	Incumbent; Heir: James Hamilton
Orders of precedence in the United Kingdom
Preceded by The Duke of Sutherland	Gentlemen; The Duke of Abercorn	Succeeded by The Duke of Westminster
