= James Hamilton, 4th Duke of Abercorn =

British peer (1904–1979)

His Grace The Duke of Abercorn
- The Duke of Abercorn in 1960

Lord Lieutenant of Tyrone
- In office 1951–1979
- Monarch: Elizabeth II
- Preceded by: James Ponsonby Galbraith
- Succeeded by: John Hamilton-Stubber

Member of the Senate of Northern Ireland
- In office 22 March 1949 – 8 May 1962

Personal details
- Born: James Edward Hamilton, Viscount Strabane; 29 February 1904 Marylebone, London
- Died: 4 June 1979 (aged 75)
- Party: Unionist
- Spouse: Hon. Kathleen Crichton (m. 1928)
- Children: 3, including James Hamilton, 5th Duke of Abercorn
- Parents: James Hamilton, 3rd Duke of Abercorn; Lady Rosalind Bingham

James Edward Hamilton, 4th Duke of Abercorn (29 February 1904 – 4 June 1979), styled Viscount Strabane until 1913 and Marquess of Hamilton between 1913 and 1953, was a British peer.

== Early life and education ==
Abercorn was born in 1904 at 15 Montagu Square, London, the son of James Hamilton, 3rd Duke of Abercorn, and Lady Rosalind Cecilia Caroline Bingham. He inherited his father's peerages on 12 September 1953.

He was educated at Eton and Royal Military College, Sandhurst.

== Career ==
After Sandhurst, Lord Hamilton was commissioned into the Grenadier Guards, where he rose to the rank of captain. In 1946, he was elected to the County Council of County Tyrone, served as High Sheriff of Tyrone, and then served in the Senate of Northern Ireland. He became Lord Lieutenant of County Tyrone on his father's death, a position he held for the remainder of his life. He was appointed honorary colonel of the 5th Battalion, Royal Inniskilling Fusiliers (a Territorial Army unit), and died at age 75.

He was active in public life in Northern Ireland. He was chairman of the trustees of the Ulster Museum from 1962–79 and Chancellor of the University of Ulster from 1970-79. He was president of the Royal Forestry Society from 1954-66 and also served as president of the International Dendrological Union (later the International Dendrology Society).

== Marriage and issue ==
In 1928, Abercorn married Lady Kathleen Crichton (1905–1990), a daughter of Henry Crichton, Viscount Crichton (1872–1914, son of 4th Earl Erne and father of the 5th Earl Erne) and Lady Mary Cavendish Grosvenor (1883–1959, daughter of the 1st Duke of Westminster).

They had two sons and a daughter:

- Lady Moyra Kathleen Hamilton (1930–2020), maid of honour at the coronation of Elizabeth II
- James Hamilton, 5th Duke of Abercorn (born 1934)
- Lord Claud Anthony Hamilton (1939–2026), who was appointed Deputy Lieutenant of County Fermanagh in 1978; he was High Sheriff of Fermanagh in 1990 and was made a Justice of the Peace for the county in 1991. In 1982, he married Catherine Janet Faulkner (niece of Lord Faulkner of Downpatrick). They have a son and a daughter.

== Ancestry ==
Ancestors of James Hamilton, 4th Duke of Abercorn

8. James Hamilton, 1st Duke of Abercorn
4. James Hamilton, 2nd Duke of Abercorn
9. Lady Louisa Jane Russell
2. James Hamilton, 3rd Duke of Abercorn
10. Richard Curzon-Howe, 1st Earl Howe
5. Lady Mary Curzon-Howe
11. Anne Gore
1. James Hamilton, 4th Duke of Hamilton
12. George Bingham, 3rd Earl of Lucan
6. Charles Bingham, 4th Earl of Lucan
13. Lady Anne Brudenell
3. Lady Rosalind Bingham
14. Charles Gordon-Lennox, 5th Duke of Richmond
7. Lady Cecilia Gordon-Lennox
7. Lady Caroline Paget

== See also ==
- List of Northern Ireland Members of the House of Lords

Honorary titles
Preceded by James Ponsonby Galbraith	Lord Lieutenant of Tyrone; 1951–1979	Succeeded by John Hamilton-Stubber
Preceded by John Blakiston-Houston	Honorary Colonel of the 5th Battalion Royal Inniskilling Fusiliers; 1963–1967	Battalion disbanded
Peerage of Ireland
Preceded by James Hamilton	Duke of Abercorn; 1953–1979	Succeeded by James Hamilton
