= Rosalind Hamilton, Duchess of Abercorn =

British aristocrat (1869–1958)

Her Grace The Duchess of Abercorn DBE
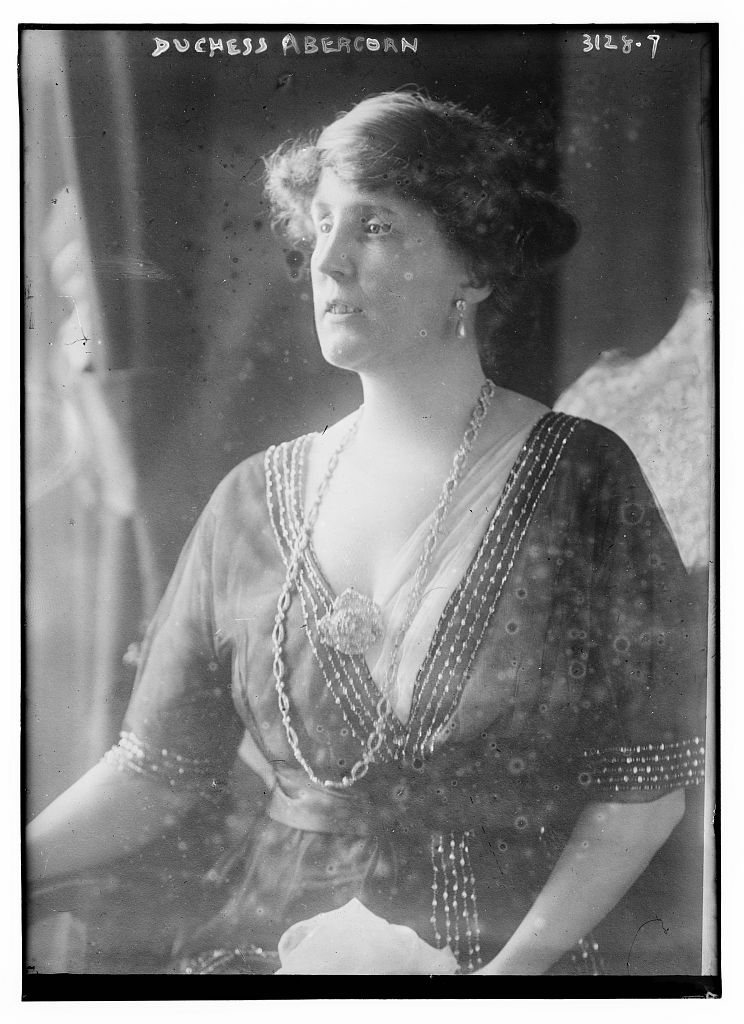
- The Duchess of Abercorn in 1914.
- Born: 26 February 1869; London, England
- Died: 18 January 1958 (aged 88); Westminster, London, England
- Spouse: James Hamilton, 3rd Duke of Abercorn (m. 1894; died 1953)
- Children: Lady Mary Gilmour; Cynthia Spencer, Countess Spencer; Lady Katherine Seymour; James Hamilton, 4th Duke of Abercorn; Lord Claud Hamilton
- Parents: Charles George Bingham, 4th Earl of Lucan; Lady Cecilia Catherine Gordon-Lennox

Dame Rosalind Cecilia Caroline Hamilton, Duchess of Abercorn, DBE (26 February 1869 – 18 January 1958; née Lady Rosalind Bingham) was a British aristocrat and the Duchess of Abercorn by marriage.

== Family and personal life ==
She was born on 26 February 1869 to Charles George Bingham, 4th Earl of Lucan, and Lady Cecilia Catherine Gordon-Lennox.

She married James, Marquess of Hamilton, eldest son of The 2nd Duke of Abercorn, on 1 November 1894 at St. Paul's Church, Knightsbridge.

They had five children:

- Lady Mary Cecilia Rhodesia Hamilton (1896–1984), who married twice, firstly in 1917 Capt/Maj. Robert Orlando Rudolph Kenyon-Slaney (1892–1965), with whom she divorced in 1930, and secondly, in 1930, to Sir John Gilmour, 2nd Baronet. With her first husband she had two daughters and a son, and with her second husband one son.
- Lady Cynthia Elinor Beatrix Hamilton (1897–1972), who married in 1919 to Albert Edward John Spencer, 7th Earl Spencer (1892–1975). They had a daughter and a son. By their son, they became grandparents of Diana, Princess of Wales.
- Lady Katherine Hamilton (1900–1985), who married in 1930 Lt-Col. Sir Reginald Henry Seymour (1878–1938), a descendant of the 1st Marquess of Hertford. She was a bridesmaid at the wedding of Prince Albert, Duke of York, and Lady Elizabeth Bowes-Lyon on 26 April 1923.
- Sir James Edward Hamilton, 4th Duke of Abercorn (1904–1979)
- Lord Claud David Hamilton (1907–1968), who worked as a barrister in the Inner Temple, and who in 1946 married Genesta Mary Heath; he was her third husband and the union was childless.

== Community work ==
When the Duchess of Abercorn and her husband left Northern Ireland in 1945, it was reported “her willingness to help all charitable and other organisations for the benefit of the community has endeared her to all.”

=== Girl Guides ===
She was Deputy Chief Commissioner of Ulster Girl Guides from 1921 to 1925. In 1925 she established the Duchess of Abercorn's Fund for Girl Guides. She was Chief Commissioner of Ulster Girl Guides between 1926 and 1945. She was recipient of the Silver Fish Award, Girl Guiding's highest adult honour, in 1937.

=== War work ===
The Duchess of Abercorn's “Ulster Gift Fund” established in 1939 was affiliated to the Red Cross and St. John Ambulance. It was instrumental in coordinating the efforts of 214 Hospital Supply Depots in the making of over 3,500 supplies, plus socks, mufflers, mittens and helmets for the war effort.

=== Other ===
- 1912 – 1922 Vice-President of the Ulster Women's Unionist Association
- 1936 – President of the Ulster Group of the Overseas in London.

== Honours ==
Rosalind, Duchess of Abercorn, was invested as a Dame Commander of the Order of the British Empire in 1936.

She was awarded the honorary degree of Doctor of Laws (LLD) by Queen's University, Belfast, County Antrim, Northern Ireland, in 1944.

Coat of arms of Rosalind Hamilton, Duchess of Abercorn
Escutcheon The arms of The Duke of Abercorn (Quarterly: 1st & 4th, gules three cinquefoils pierced ermine (for Hamilton); 2nd & 3rd, argent, Argent, a lymphad with the sails furled proper, flagged gules and oars in action sable (for Arran) in the point of honour and over all, an inescutcheon azure with charged three fleur-de-lys or, and surmounted by a French ducal coronet (for Châtellerault)) impaled with the arms of The Earl of Lucan (Azure, a Bend cotised between six Crosses-Patée Or).
