= Duke of Abercorn =

Title in the Peerage of Ireland

Dukedom of Abercorn
- Arms of Duke of Abercorn: Quarterly: 1st & 4th, gules three cinquefoils pierced ermine (for Hamilton); 2nd & 3rd, argent, Argent, a lymphad with the sails furled proper, and oars in action sable (for Arran) in the point of honour and over all, an inescutcheon azure with charged three fleur-de-lys or, and surmounted by a French ducal coronet (for Châtellerault)
- Creation date: 10 August 1868
- Created by: Victoria
- Peerage: Peerage of Ireland
- First holder: James Hamilton, 2nd Marquess of Abercorn
- Present holder: James Hamilton, 5th Duke
- Heir apparent: James Hamilton, Marquess of Hamilton
- Remainder to: The 1st Duke's heirs male of the body lawfully begotten
- Subsidiary titles: Marquess of Abercorn; Marquess of Hamilton (Great Britain); Earl of Abercorn (Scotland); Viscount Strabane; Viscount Hamilton (Great Britain); Lord Paisley (Scotland); Lord of Abercorn (Scotland); Lord of Paisley, Hamilton, Mountcastell and Kilpatrick (Scotland); Lord Hamilton, Baron of Strabane; Baron Mountcastle; Baronet Hamilton of Dunalong
- Seat: Baronscourt
- Motto: Sola Nobilitas Virtus ("The only nobility is virtue")

The title Duke of Abercorn (/ˈævərkɔːrn/) is a title in the Peerage of Ireland. It was created in 1868 and bestowed upon James Hamilton, 2nd Marquess of Abercorn. Although the Dukedom is in the Peerage of Ireland, it refers to Abercorn, West Lothian, and the Duke also bears four titles in the Peerage of Scotland and two in the Peerage of Great Britain, and is one of three peers who have titles in those three peerages. The Duke of Abercorn also claims the French title of Duke of Châtellerault, created in 1548.

== History ==
In acknowledgement of his loyalty, James VI of Scotland (James I of England) conferred on the Hon. Claud Hamilton, third son of James Hamilton, 2nd Earl of Arran, the title Lord Paisley. His son James Hamilton was created Lord Abercorn on 5 April 1603, then on 10 July 1606 he was made Earl of Abercorn and Lord of Paisley, Hamilton, Mountcastell and Kilpatrick.

His successor, the 2nd Earl of Abercorn, was additionally created Lord Hamilton, Baron of Strabane, in the Peerage of Ireland, on 8 May 1617. He resigned this dignity to his younger brother in 1633; the brother's heirs inherited the Earldom and other titles in 1680, in the person of Claud Hamilton, 4th Earl of Abercorn. He was attainted in Ireland in 1691, and the Barony of Strabane forfeited, but his brother Charles Hamilton, 5th Earl of Abercorn, obtained a reversal of the attainder and recovered in 1692.

The 6th earl was at his accession an Irish baronet, "of Dunalong in the County of Tyrone, and of Nenagh in the County of Tipperary" (1660). He was additionally created Baron Mountcastle and Viscount Strabane, in the Peerage of Ireland, on 2 September 1701. The 7th earl became the first of the Earls of Abercorn to be invested a Privy Counsellor, having been appointed to both the English and Irish Privy Councils. The 8th earl was created Viscount Hamilton, of Hamilton, in the Peerage of Great Britain on 24 August 1786. He was succeeded by his nephew, who was created Marquess of Abercorn in the Peerage of Great Britain on 15 October 1790, after having sat in the House of Commons as MP for East Looe and for St Germans. He was made a Knight of the Order of the Garter in 1805.

The 2nd Marquess, who had been given the Garter in 1844, served as Lord Lieutenant of Ireland from 1866 to 1868 (and again from 1874 to 1876); and on 10 August 1868, during his first term, he was created Marquess of Hamilton, of Strabane, and Duke of Abercorn (in the Peerage of Ireland). His successor, the 2nd Duke, continued the family tradition by being awarded the Garter in 1892; the 3rd Duke served as MP for Londonderry and as Governor of Northern Ireland, along with being created a Knight of St Patrick and given the Garter. Currently, the holder of the Dukedom is James Hamilton, 5th Duke of Abercorn, also a Knight of the Garter.

Of the subsidiary titles above, Marquess of Hamilton is the courtesy title of the heir apparent, and Viscount Strabane that of his heir-apparent.

The Dukes of Abercorn also claim the French title of Duc de Châtellerault, as heirs-male of the 2nd Earl of Arran, who was granted the title in 1548 by Henry II of France. Additionally, since the death of William Hamilton, 2nd Duke of Hamilton, in 1651, the Earls, Marquesses, and Dukes of Abercorn have been the rightful claimants to the peerage dignities of Earl of Arran (of the 1503 creation) and Lord Hamilton (of the 1445 creation), both in the Peerage of Scotland, as the most senior heirs-male of James Hamilton, Duke of Châtellerault, and this title is reflected in their coat of arms, with an inescutcheon of three fleurs-de-lys and a French ducal crown.

Diana, Princess of Wales, was a great-granddaughter of the 3rd Duke of Abercorn.

== Estates and residences ==
=== Country seat ===
The family seat is Baronscourt (usually known locally as Baronscourt Castle), a neo-Classical country house on the Barons Court Estate near Newtownstewart, Omagh, a village near Strabane, County Tyrone, Northern Ireland.

The traditional burial place of the Dukes of Abercorn and their families is the cemetery at Baronscourt Parish Church.

=== Estates ===
In the 1883 edition of John Bateman's The Great Landowners of Great Britain and Ireland, James Hamilton, 1st Duke of Abercorn's estates were recorded as spanning 78,662 acres across Ireland and Scotland, including 60,000 acres in County Tyrone, 16,500 acres in County Donegal, 1,500 acres in Edinburghshire, and 662 acres in Renfrewshire, which produced a combined annual income of £53,400.

=== London residences ===
The 1st Duke leased Chesterfield House, Mayfair from George Stanhope, 6th Earl of Chesterfield in 1850, and used the house as his London residence until 1869. The Duke then leased Hampden House, Mayfair in 1869, which remained as the family's London house until 1906, and then again from 1909 to 1919. Hampden House, which was leased from the Duke of Westminster's Grosvenor Estate, was reportedly adversely affected by building works being carried out on North Audley Street during the 1890s, and by 1903 James Hamilton, 2nd Duke of Abercorn was making attempts to sell the remainder of his leasehold interest in the property, which then had a remaining term of 17 years. The Duke vacated the house in 1906, and instead leased No. 35 Park Street, Mayfair. After a series of protracted negotiations relating to proposed building extensions by the Duke and renewal of the lease by the Grosvenors, in 1909 the 2nd Duke secured a 63-year lease of Hampden House for £10,000, with an annual ground rent payable of £850 and resumed his occupation of the property.

Following the second Duke's death in 1913, the leasehold interest in the Hampden House was inherited by his son James Hamilton, 3rd Duke of Abercorn, who later sold the lease to George Sutherland-Leveson-Gower, 5th Duke of Sutherland in 1919.

By December 1919 the third Duke had purchased No. 68 Mount Street, Mayfair, which would remain as his London home until his death in September 1953. His son the fourth Duke sold the house in April 1954 and moved to the family's estates in Northern Ireland. No. 10 Little Chester Street, Belgravia was listed as the 5th Duke's London residence in the 1995, 2008, and 2019 editions of Debrett's Peerage.

== List of titleholders ==
=== Lords Paisley (1587) ===
- Claud Hamilton, 1st Lord Paisley (1543–1621) was a Scottish politician
  - The 1st Earl of Abercorn was the 1st Lord's eldest son. He predeceased his father
- James Hamilton, 2nd Lord Paisley was already 2nd Earl of Abercorn

=== Earls of Abercorn (1606) ===
Other titles: Lord Abercorn, in the county of Linlithgow (Sc 1603) and Lord Paisley, Hamilton, Mountcashell and Kirkpatrick (Sc 1606)

- James Hamilton, 1st Earl of Abercorn (1575–1618) had been created Lord Abercorn in 1603

Other titles (2nd Earl onwards): Lord Paisley, in the county of Renfrew (Sc 1587)
Other titles (2nd Earl): Baron Hamilton of Strabane, in the county of Tyrone (Ir 1617, res. 1633)

- James Hamilton, 2nd Earl of Abercorn (c. 1604 – c. 1670), eldest son of the 1st Earl, succeeded his grandfather as 2nd Lord Paisley in 1621
  - James Hamilton, Lord Paisley (c. 1633 – c. 1670), eldest son of the 2nd Earl, died without male issue
- George Hamilton, 3rd Earl of Abercorn (c. 1636–c. 1680), third and youngest son of the 2nd Earl, died unmarried

Other titles (4th Earl): Baron Hamilton of Strabane, in the county of Tyrone (Ir 1617, suc. 1668, att. 1691)

- Claud Hamilton, 4th Earl of Abercorn (c. 1659–c. 1691), already 5th Lord Hamilton, was descended from the 3rd son of the 1st Earl. He died unmarried

Other titles (5th Earl onwards): Baron Hamilton of Strabane, in the county of Tyrone (Ir 1617, rest. 1692)

- Charles Hamilton, 5th Earl of Abercorn (died 1701), younger brother of the 4th Earl, died without issue
- James Hamilton, 6th Earl of Abercorn (c. 1661–1734), eldest son of Col James, himself eldest son of Sir George, himself fourth and youngest son of the 1st Earl

Other titles (7th Earl onwards): Viscount Strabane and Baron Mountcastle, in the county of Tyrone (Ir 1701)

- James Hamilton, 7th Earl of Abercorn (1685–1744), eldest son of the 6th Earl

Other tiles (8th Earl onwards): Viscount Hamilton (GB 1786)

- James Hamilton, 8th Earl of Abercorn (1712–1789), eldest son of the 7th Earl, died unmarried
- John Hamilton, 9th Earl of Abercorn (1756–1818) was created Marquess of Abercorn in 1790

=== Marquesses of Abercorn (1790) ===
Other titles: Earl of Abercorn (Sc 1606), Viscount Strabane (Ir 1701), Viscount Hamilton (GB 1786), Lord Paisley, in the county of Renfrew (Sc 1587), Lord Abercorn, in the county of Linlithgow (Sc 1603), Lord Paisley, Hamilton, Mountcashell and Kirkpatrick (Sc 1606), Lord Hamilton of Strabane, in the county of Tyrone (Ir 1617) and Baron Mountcastle, in the county of Tyrone (Ir 1701)

- John Hamilton, 1st Marquess of Abercorn (1756–1818), only son of Capt John, himself second son of the 7th Earl
  - James Hamilton, Viscount Hamilton (1786–1814), elder son of the 1st Marquess, predeceased his father
- James Hamilton, 2nd Marquess of Abercorn (1811–1885) was created Duke of Abercorn in 1868

=== Dukes of Abercorn (1868) ===
Other titles: Marquess of Abercorn (GB 1790), Marquess of Hamilton, of Strabane in the county of Tyrone (1868), Earl of Abercorn (Sc 1606), Viscount Strabane (Ir 1701), Viscount Hamilton (GB 1786), Lord Paisley, in the county of Renfrew (Sc 1587), Lord Abercorn, in the county of Linlithgow (Sc 1603), Lord Paisley, Hamilton, Mountcashell and Kirkpatrick (Sc 1606), Lord Hamilton of Strabane, in the county of Tyrone (Ir 1617) and Baron Mountcastle, in the county of Tyrone (Ir 1701)

- James Hamilton, 1st Duke of Abercorn (1811–1885), elder son of Lord Hamilton
- James Hamilton, 2nd Duke of Abercorn (1838–1913), eldest son of the 1st Duke
- James Albert Edward Hamilton, 3rd Duke of Abercorn (1869–1953), eldest son of the 2nd Duke. His daughter Cynthia Spencer, Countess Spencer was grandmother of Diana, Princess of Wales.
- James Edward Hamilton, 4th Duke of Abercorn (1904–1979), elder son of the 3rd Duke
- James Hamilton, 5th Duke of Abercorn (born 1934), elder son of the 4th Duke

== Line of succession ==
Line of succession
- James Hamilton, 4th Duke of Abercorn (1904–1979)
  - James Hamilton, 5th Duke of Abercorn (b. 1934)
    - (1) James Hamilton, Marquess of Hamilton (b. 1969)
      - (2) James Hamilton, Viscount Strabane (b. 2005)
      - (3) Lord Claud Hamilton (b. 2007)
    - (4) Lord Nicholas Hamilton (b. 1979)
  - Lord Claud Anthony Hamilton (1939-2026)
    - (5) Alexander Hamilton (b. 1987)

The present Proby baronet is in remainder to the marquessate of Abercorn, being descended from a younger son of the first marquess.

== Family tree ==
Douglas-Hamilton family trees: Dukes of: Abercorn, Brandon, and Hamilton with subsidiary and courtesy titles

James II; 1430–1460; King of Scotland
Earl of Arran (Scotland) (1st creation), 1467	Lord Hamilton, 1445
Thomas Boyd d. c. 1473; Earl of Arran	Mary Stewart; 1453–1488 dowager Countess of Arran	James Hamilton c. 1415–1479; 1st Lord Hamilton	James III; 1451–1488; King of Scotland
Earldom of Arran (1st creation) forfeit, 1469
Earl of Arran (Scotland) (2nd creation), 1503
James Hamilton c. 1475–1529; 2nd Lord Hamilton, 1st Earl of Arran	James IV; 1473–1513; King of Scotland
Catherine Stewart (illegit.) c. 1495–1554	James Douglas d. 1548; Earl of Morton
Duke of Châtellerault (France) (5th creation), 1548
James Hamilton c. 1516–1575; 2nd Earl of Arran, 3rd Lord Hamilton, 1st Duke of Châtellerault	Margaret Douglas c. 1510–1579
Dukedom of Châtellerault (5th creation) forfeit, 1559
Marquess of Hamilton, Earl of Arran, and Lord Aven, 1599	Lord Paisley, 1587
James Hamilton c. 1533–1609; 3rd Earl of Arran, 4th Lord Hamilton	Anne Hamilton c. 1535 – c. 1574 m. George Gordon Earl of Huntly	John Hamilton; 1540–1604; 1st Marquess of Hamilton, etc.	Claud Hamilton; 1546–1621; Lord Paisley
Earl of Cambridge (England) (4th creation) and Baron of Innerdale, 1619	Lord Abercorn, 1603; Earl of Abercorn, Lord of Paisley, Hamilton, Mountcastell and Kilpatrick, 1606
George Gordon; 1562–1636; Marquess of Huntly	James Hamilton; 1589–1625; 2nd Marquess of Hamilton, etc., 4th Earl of Arran, 1st Earl of Cambridge, etc. 5th Lord Hamilton, Lord Aberbrothwick/Arbroath	James Hamilton; 1575–1618; 1st Earl of Abercorn, Lord Abercorn and Lord of Paisley, Hamilton, Mountcastell and Kilpatrick
Earldom of Angus (1389 creation) resigned in favor of: Marquess of Douglas, Earl of Angus, Lord Abernethy, Lord Bonkyll and Preston, Lord Abernethy, and Lord Jedburgh Forest, 1633	Duke of Hamilton, Marquess of Clydesdale, Earl of Arran and Cambridge (Scotland) and Baron of Aven and Innerdale, 1643	Earl of Lanark, 1639	Baron Hamilton of Strabane, 1617
William Douglas; 1589–1660; 1st Marquess of Douglas, etc. 11th Earl of Angus (1389 creation)	Mary Gordon c. 1600–1674	James Hamilton; 1606–1649; 1st Duke of Hamilton, etc., 3rd Marquess of Hamilton, etc., 5th Earl of Arran, 2nd Earl of Cambridge, etc.	William Hamilton; 1616–1651; 2nd Duke of Hamilton, etc., 1st Earl of Lanark, 6th Earl of Arran, 3rd Earl of Cambridge, etc.	James Hamilton c. 1604 – c. 1670; 2nd Earl of Abercorn, etc., 2nd Lord Paisley, 1st Lord Hamilton of Strabane	Claud Hamilton c. 1606–1638; 2nd Lord Hamilton of Strabane	George Hamilton c. 1607–1679
Earldom of Cambridge (4th creation) and Barony of Innerdale extinct and Earldom of Arran (2nd creation) dormant, 1651
Earl of Selkirk and Lord Daer and Shortcleuch, 1646
see Earl of Ormond family tree for Marquesses of Douglas, Earls of Angus, etc.	William Douglas-Hamilton; 1634–1694 jure uxoris Duke of Hamilton, etc. suo jure, 1st Earl of Selkirk, etc.	Anne Hamilton; 1631–1716 suo jure 3rd Duchess of Hamilton, etc., 2nd Countess of Lanark	George Hamilton c. 1636 – c. 1680; 3rd Earl of Abercorn, etc.	James Hamilton c. 1633 – c. 1670; Lord Paisley	James Hamilton; 1633–1655; 3rd Lord Hamilton of Strabane	George Hamilton c. 1636–1668; 4th Lord Hamilton of Strabane	James Hamilton c. 1620–1673
Ceded Dukedom of Hamilton to 4th Duke, 1698
Duke of Brandon and Baron Dutton, 1711	Earl of Ruglen, 1697	Earl of Orkney (3rd creation), 1697	Viscount Strabane and Baron Mountcastle, 1701
James Hamilton; 1658–1712; 4th Duke of Hamilton, etc., 1st Duke of Brandon, etc. 3rd Earl of Lanark, etc.	Charles Douglas; 1663–1739; 2nd Earl of Selkirk, etc.	John Douglas-Hamilton; 1664–1744; 3rd Earl of Selkirk, etc., 1st Earl of Ruglen	George Hamilton; 1666–1737; 1st Earl of Orkney	Basil Hamilton; 1671–1701	Catherine Hamilton	Charles Hamilton d. 1701; 5th Earl of Abercorn, etc., 6th Lord Hamilton of Strabane	Claud Hamilton; 1658–1691; 4th Earl of Abercorn, etc., 5th Lord Hamilton of Strabane	James Hamilton c. 1661–1734; 6th Earl of Abercorn, etc., 7th Lord Hamilton of Strabane
see Earls of Ruglen	see Earls of Orkney	Basil Hamilton; 1696–1742	James Hamilton; 1685–1744; 7th Earl of Abercorn, etc., 8th Lord Hamilton of Strabane
Viscount Hamilton, 1786
James Hamilton; 1703–1743; 5th Duke of Hamilton, etc., 2nd Duke of Brandon, etc. 4th Earl of Lanark, etc.	Lord Anne Hamilton; 1709–1748	Dunbar Douglas; 1722–1799; 4th Earl of Selkirk, etc.	James Hamilton; 1712–1789; 8th Earl of Abercorn, etc., 9th Lord Hamilton of Strabane, 1st Viscount Hamilton	John Hamilton; 1714–1755
Baron Hamilton of Hameldon county, Leicester, 1776	Marquess of Abercorn, 1790
James Hamilton; 1724–1758; 6th Duke of Hamilton, etc., 3rd Duke of Brandon, etc., 5th Earl of Lanark, etc.	Elizabeth Gunning (c. 1733–1790) suo jure 1st Baroness Hamilton	Archibald Hamilton; 1740–1819; 9th Duke of Hamilton, etc., 6th Duke of Brandon, 8th Earl of Lanark, etc.	Charles Powell Hamilton; 1747–1825	John Hamilton; 1756–1818; 1st Marquess of Abercorn, 9th Earl of Abercorn, etc., 10th Lord Hamilton of Strabane
James Hamilton; 1755–1769; 7th Duke of Hamilton, etc., 4th Duke of Brandon and Baron Dutton, Marquess of Angus and Abernethy, 4th Marquess of Douglas, etc., 6th Earl of Lanark, etc.	Douglas Hamilton; 1756–1799; 8th Duke of Hamilton, etc., 5th Duke of Brandon, Marquess of Douglas, etc.<>br/>7th Earl of Lanark, etc., 2nd Baron Hamilton	Alexander Hamilton; 1767–1852; 10th Duke of Hamilton, etc., 7th Duke of Brandon, Marquess of Douglas, and Baron Dutton, Earl of Angus, and Lord Abernethy and Jedburgh Forest, 9th Earl of Lanark, etc.	Augustus Barrington Price Anne Powell Douglas-Hamilton; 1781–1849	Thomas Douglas; 1771–1820; 5th Earl of Selkirk, etc.	James Hamilton; 1786–1818 styled Viscount Hamilton
Duke of Abercorn, of Strabane and Duke of Abercorn, 1868
William Alexander Anthony Archibald Hamilton; 1811–1863; 11th Duke of Hamilton, etc., 8th Duke of Brandon, Marquess of Douglas, Earl of Angus, Lord Abernethy and Jedburgh Forest, and Baron Dutton, 10th Earl of Lanark, etc.	Charles Douglas-Hamilton; 1808–1873	Dunbar James Douglas; 1809–1885; 6th Earl of Selkirk, etc.	James Hamilton; 1811–1885; 1st Duke of Abercorn, 2nd Marquess of Abercorn, 10th Earl of Abercorn, etc., 2nd Viscount Hamilton, 11th Lord Hamilton of Strabane
Duke of Châtellerault (France) (5th creation), revived 1548
William Alexander Louis Stephen Douglas-Hamilton; 1845–1895; 12th Duke of Hamilton, etc., 9th Duke of Brandon, Marquess of Douglas, Earl of Angus, Lord Abernethy and Jedburgh Forest and Baron Dutton, 2nd Duke of Châtellerault, 8th Earl of Selkirk, etc., 11th Earl of Lanark, etc.	Charles George Douglas-Hamilton; 1847–1886; 7th Earl of Selkirk, etc.	James Hamilton; 1838–1913; 2nd Duke of Abercorn, 3rd Marquess of Abercorn, 11th Earl of Abercorn, etc., 12th Lord Hamilton of Strabane
Alfred Douglas Douglas-Hamilton; 1862–1940; 13th Duke of Hamilton, etc., 10th Duke of Brandon, Marquess of Douglas, Earl of Angus (1633 creation), Lord Abernethy and Jedburgh Forest, and Baron Dutton, 20th Earl of Angus (1389 creation), 9th Earl of Selkirk, etc., 12th Earl of Lanark, etc.	James Albert Edward Hamilton; 1869–1953; 3rd Duke of Abercorn, 4th Marquess of Abercorn, 12th Earl of Abercorn, etc., 13th Lord Hamilton of Strabane
Douglas Douglas-Hamilton; 1903–1973; 14th Duke of Hamilton, etc., 11th Duke of Brandon, Marquess of Douglas, Earl of Angus (1633 creation), Lord Abernethy and Jedburgh Forest, and Baron Dutton, 21st Earl of Angus (1389 creation), 13rd Earl of Lanark, etc.	George Nigel Douglas-Hamilton; 1906–1994; 10th Earl of Selkirk, etc., 10th Lord Daer and Shortcleuch	Malcolm Douglas-Hamilton; 1909–1964	James Edward Hamilton; 1904–1979; 4th Duke of Abercorn, 5th Marquess of Abercorn, 13th Earl of Abercorn, etc., 14th Lord Hamilton of Strabane
Baron Selkirk of Douglas, 1997
Angus Alan Douglas Douglas-Hamilton; 1938–2010; 15th Duke of Hamilton, etc., 12th Duke of Brandon, Marquess of Douglas, Earl of Angus (1633 creation), Lord Abernethy and Jedburgh Forest, and Baron Dutton, 22nd Earl of Angus (1389 creation), 14th Earl of Lanark, etc.	James Alexander Douglas-Hamilton; 1942–2023; 11th Earl of Selkirk, etc., Earldom disclaimed, 1994, Baron Selkirk of Douglas	Alasdair Douglas-Hamilton b. 1939	James Hamilton b. 1934; 5th Duke of Abercorn, 6th Marquess of Abercorn, 14th Earl of Abercorn, etc., 15th Lord Hamilton of Strabane
Barony Selkirk of Douglas expired as a life peerage, 2023
Alexander Douglas-Hamilton b. 1978; 16th Duke of Hamilton, etc., 13th Duke of Brandon, Marquess of Douglas, Earl of Angus (1633 creation), Lord Abernethy and Jedburgh Forest, and Baron Dutton, 23rd Earl of Angus (1389 creation), 15th Earl of Lanark and Lord Machanshyre and Polmont	John William Douglas-Hamilton b. 1979	John Andrew Douglas-Hamilton b. 1978; 12th Earl of Selkirk, etc.	Charles Douglas Douglas-Hamilton (b. 1979)	Angus Gavin Douglas-Hamilton b. 1968	James Hamilton b. 1969 styled Marquess of Hamilton
Heir presumptive to the Earldom of Selkirk
Douglas Douglas-Hamilton b. 2012 styled Marquess of Douglas and Clydesdale	William Frederick Douglas-Hamilton b. 2014	Basil George Douglas-Hamilton b. 2016	William Douglas-Hamilton b. 1999	James Hamilton b. 2005 styled Viscount Strabane
Heir apparent to the dukedoms of Hamilton and Brandon

== See also ==
- Duchess of Abercorn
- Duke of Hamilton
- Earl of Arran (Scotland)
- Hamilton baronets
- Proby baronets of Elton Hall
- Clan Douglas
