= Baronscourt =

Georgian country house and estate in County Tyrone, Northern Ireland

Coordinates: 54.692222°N 7.438889°W

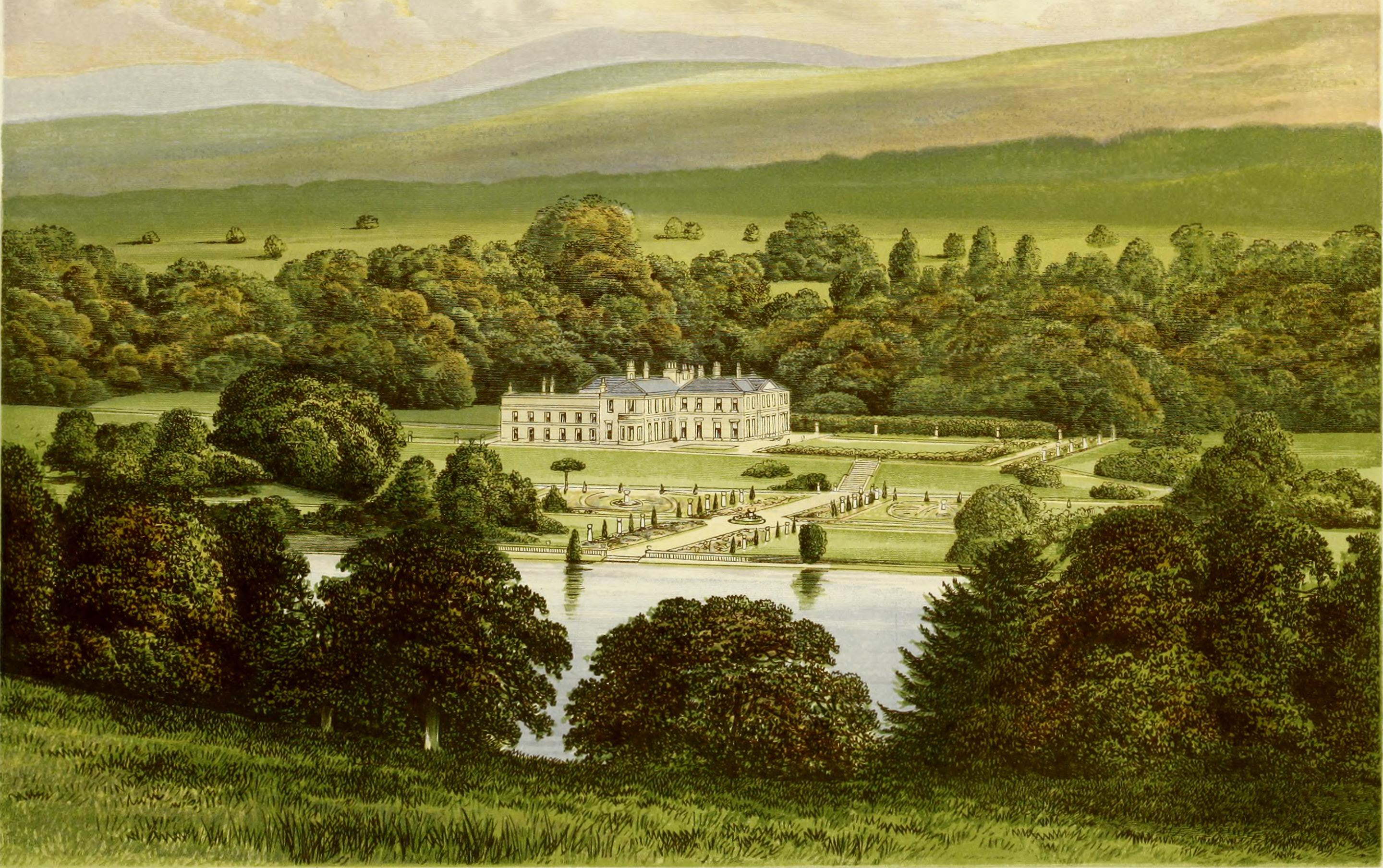
Baronscourt in 1840, from The County Seats of the Noblemen and Gentlemen of Great Britain and Ireland, by Francis Orpen Morris.

Baronscourt, Barons-Court or Baronscourt Castle is a Georgian country house and estate 4.5 km southwest of Newtownstewart in County Tyrone, Northern Ireland, and is the seat of the Duke of Abercorn. It is a Grade A-listed building.

Baronscourt is the caput or chief residence in Ireland of the Dukes of Abercorn. It was called Baronscourt because, in the Peerage of Ireland, the Abercorns are the Barons Hamilton of Strabane. The house is surrounded by the Baronscourt Estate.

== History ==
Baronscourt and its surrounding demesne are located on lands that originally belonged to a senior-ranking branch of the Ó Néill (English: O'Neill) clan, a powerful and wealthy Gaelic royal family that ruled Tír Eoghain (Tyrone), a túath or Gaelic kingdom in Ulster. The senior-ranking line of the Ó Néill clan of Tír Eoghain were the leading family within the wider Cenél nEógain dynastic group. The particular branch of the Ó Néill dynasty that dominated the north-western swathe of Tír Eoghain had several 'castles' or towerhouses, including one that was located on Island McHugh, a crannóg situated in what is now known as Lough Catherine, a short distance to the north of the current Baronscourt.

Most of the Ó Néill dynasty had their lands confiscated by the English Crown in the early seventeenth century, shortly after the end of the Nine Years' War. Some of the confiscated Ó Néill lands in the Barony of Strabane Lower in West Ulster were then handed over by the Crown, around 1610 or 1611, to Sir George Hamilton, a Lowland Scots 'Planter' from Renfrewshire, at the very start of the Plantation of Ulster. Sir George, a Catholic and a younger brother of the 1st Earl of Abercorn, proceeded to have Derrywoone Castle built on these lands as his chief residence. Derrywoone Castle, now ruined, is a Lowland Scots-style castle and 'bawn' which was probably built between 1619 and 1622. The castle and its surrounding village were built just to the east of Lough Catherine and a short distance to the north-east of the later Baronscourt. Nothing now remains above ground of Derrywoone village.

The first 'Baron's Court' or Baronscourt to be built for the Hamilton dynasty was designed by the architect William Chambers in 1742. However, it was rebuilt and modified on many occasions. Notably, it was largely rebuilt between 1779 and 1781 for the 8th Earl of Abercorn. The house is a neo-classical mansion surrounded by ornate Italian-style gardens, and woodland. The estate also features an 18-hole golf course which celebrated its centenary in 2014.

The traditional burial place of the Dukes of Abercorn and their families is the graveyard at Baronscourt Parish Church.

The current Baronscourt was originally designed by George Steuart in 1778, and it was built 1779–1782. The house is seven bays wide and three stories high with a loggia of coupled Tuscan columns and a rotunda at the centre of the plan. The pediment contains the coat of arms of the Duke of Abercorn's family. The house was soon remodelled in 1791 by John Soane. Robert Woodgate was responsible to oversee the works.

The agent of the 1st Marquess of Abercorn described the alterations as:

"He just reverses the house, what was the backside is to be the entrance, and the front part of the rere. The drawing room, parlour and as far back in the hall as the pillars, is to be thrown into one gallery."

Soane also designed a glasshouse in 1789.

Soon after the works were completed, they were destroyed by a 1796 fire which damaged everything except the wings. Robert Woodgate was brought back to oversee the reconstruction of the house 1797–1798.

In 1835–1843 Richard and William Vitruvius Morrison were brought in to undertake further modifications to the house including the library. In the early part of the 20th century A.T. Bolton made copies of Soane's original drawings. In the late 20th century, David Hicks remodelled the library.

An agent's house was designed and built by James Martin in 1741–1745. David Sheehan, stonecutter, made 3–4 chimney pieces for the 8th Earl in 1745. Was this for a house which no longer exists? James Bloomfield undertook landscape improvements in 1746. James Miller built stables in 1749. James Dick and Alexander Stewart were employed as stonecutters on the new house 1778–1781. Mr. Hawkshaw was the foreman on the new house. James Lee worked as a plasterer in 1794. Peter Frederick Robinson built Rock Cottage in 1832 and Newtownstuart Gate in 1835. Joseph Bell designed and built new stables in the baronial style for the 2nd Duke of Abercorn in 1889.

=== War of Independence ===
The Protestant Hamilton family were archetypical of the ruling Anglo-Irish minority that dominated the island's systems of government for centuries.

At the vanguard of Ulster Unionism, the 2nd Duke of Abercorn had been a founder of the Ulster Unionist Council (UUC), and his son, the 3rd Duke, served as chairman of the same. A long-standing and vehement opponent of Irish self-determination, the 3rd Duke urged the local Loyalist forces to "die if necessary in opposing home rule." It is, perhaps, unsurprising therefore that by the time of the Irish War of Independence, Baronscourt had become a base for the activities of the Ulster Volunteers, and a consequent target for the Irish Republican Army (IRA).

On 17 May 1918, the estate was raided by Sinn Féin military units. As reported in the Strabane Chronicle, Baronscourt Castle "was the scene of a most exciting raid for arms by a very large force of masked and armed men in the early hours." As the paper recounted, the exercise was accomplished under cover of darkness, when a number of IRA volunteers infiltrated the grounds in a series of motor cars while the absentee landlords were away in England, with the object of appropriating arms belonging to the Ulster Volunteers.

On arrival, the party detained the landsteward, Mr. Robert Bell, and removed the night watchman, Mr. Edward Young, four miles from the demesne. They then proceeded to comb the premises for rifles and ammunition, having earlier severed telegraph and telephone links from the house. With axes and general force, they secured access to all rooms of the mansion with such order that it was understood that some of the men must have had prior working knowledge of the building's layout. Of the female servants present, all would later attest that they suffered no malevolent attention from the invading forces. The relative success of the skirmish is contested; Unionist newspapers maintained that the force absconded with only six "rusty swords" of value only as antiques, as well as portraits of the British King and Queen. Conversely, sympathetic publications asserted that "a large quantity of arms and ammunition were removed." Neither is there a clear impression of the number of assailants - estimates ranged from eight to twenty cars, and sixty to two hundred men.

In the aftermath of the raid, the 3rd Duke decried both the rebels and the efficacy of the United Kingdom's government in Ireland, demanding to know how it was possible that with the contemporary "restrictions on motoring and the use of petrol, eight motor cars, each packed full of men, should be able to travel a considerable distance, as these men must have done without any interference of questions asked by the police as to the object of their journey? [...] Where, and how, is the necessary petrol obtainable? And, finally, how much longer is Ireland going to be treated as a neutral country, and all those laws and regulations imposed upon the British Islands for the furtherance of the war and cheerfully submitted to by the people of England, Scotland, and Wales, and the loyal population of Ireland allowed to be disregarded and treated with contempt by those who in Ireland openly proclaim their disloyalty and detestation of the British connexion?" Despite the widespread publicity, no arrests were made in consequence of the raid.

== Burials in the cemetery of Baronscourt Parish Church ==
- The 1st Duke of Abercorn
- The 2nd Duke of Abercorn
- The 3rd Duke of Abercorn
- Sacha, Duchess of Abercorn

== Bibliography ==
- Morris, Francis Orpen (1880), A Series of Picturesque Views of Seats of Noblemen and Gentlemen of Great Britain and Ireland, vol. 4, London: William MacKenzie
- Murdoch, Tessa (ed.) (2022). Great Irish Households: Inventories from the Long Eighteenth Century. Cambridge: John Adamson, pp. 177–85 ISBN 978-1-898565-17-8 OCLC 1233305993
- Paul, James Balfour (1904), The Scots Peerage, vol. 1, Edinburgh: David Douglas – Abercorn to Balmerino
