= James Hamilton, 3rd Duke of Abercorn =

British peer (1869–1953)

His Grace The Duke of Abercorn KG KP PC PC (NI)
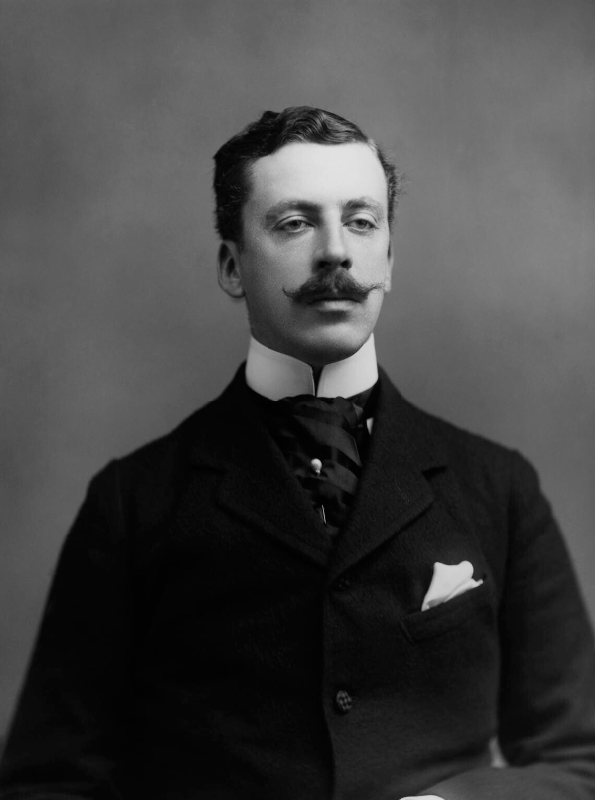
- The then Marquess of Hamilton, c. 1894. He succeeded as Duke of Abercorn in June 1913.

Governor of Northern Ireland
- In office 12 December 1922 – 6 September 1945
- Monarchs: George V; Edward VIII; George VI
- Preceded by: Office established
- Succeeded by: The Earl Granville

Personal details
- Born: 30 November 1869 Hamilton Place, Piccadilly, London
- Died: 12 September 1953 (aged 83) London, England
- Party: Unionist
- Spouse: Lady Rosalind Bingham (m. 1894)
- Children: Lady Mary Gilmour; Cynthia Spencer, Countess Spencer; Lady Katherine Seymour; James Hamilton, 4th Duke of Abercorn; Lord Claud Hamilton
- Parents: James Hamilton, 2nd Duke of Abercorn (father); Lady Mary Anna Curzon-Howe (mother)

James Albert Edward Hamilton, 3rd Duke of Abercorn (30 November 1869 – 12 September 1953), styled Marquess of Hamilton between 1885 and 1913, was a British peer and Unionist politician. He was the first Governor of Northern Ireland, a post he held between 1922 and 1945.

Flag of the governor of Northern Ireland

== Background and education ==
Born in Hamilton Place, Piccadilly, London, on 30 November 1869, he was the eldest son of the 2nd Duke of Abercorn and godson of Albert Edward, Prince of Wales. His mother, Lady Mary Anna, was the fourth daughter of the 1st Earl Howe. He was educated at Eton and subsequently served first in the Royal Inniskilling Fusiliers until 1892 when he joined the 1st Life Guards. Hamilton was later transferred as major to the North Irish Horse.

In early 1901, he accompanied his father on a special diplomatic mission to announce the accession of King Edward to the governments of Denmark, Sweden and Norway, Russia, Germany, and Saxony.

== Political career ==
In the 1900 general election, Lord Hamilton stood successfully as Unionist candidate for Londonderry City, and three years later he became Treasurer of the Household, a post he held until the fall of Balfour's Conservative administration in 1905. After serving for a time as an Opposition whip, Hamilton succeeded his father as third Duke of Abercorn in 1913. From the 1890s until the partition of Ireland he was a prominent figure in the Unionist campaign to resist Home Rule in Ireland. Abercorn urged the Apprentice Boys of Omagh in County Tyrone to "die if necessary in opposing home rule". In 1922 he was appointed governor of the newly created Northern Ireland. He also served as Lord Lieutenant of Tyrone from 1917 until his death, having previously been a Deputy Lieutenant for County Donegal. Abercorn was a popular Royal representative amongst the Unionist population in Northern Ireland, and was reappointed to the post in 1928 after completing his first term of office. In 1931, he declined the offer of the governor generalship of Canada, and three years later he was again reappointed governor for a third term. He remained in this capacity until his resignation in July 1945.

Abercorn was made the last non-royal Knight of the Most Illustrious Order of Saint Patrick in 1922, and six years later became a Knight Companion of the Most Noble Order of the Garter. In the latter year, he was also the recipient of an honorary degree from the Queen's University of Belfast, and received the Royal Victorian Chain in 1945, the same year he was sworn of the Privy Council.

== Family and children ==
Abercorn married Lady Rosalind Cecilia Caroline Bingham (1869–1958), only daughter of the 4th Earl of Lucan and Lady Cecilia Catherine Gordon-Lennox (1838–1910); daughter of the 5th Duke of Richmond, at St. Paul's Church, Knightsbridge, on 1 November 1894. They had five children:

- Lady Mary Cecilia Rhodesia Hamilton (1896–1984), who married twice, firstly in 1917 Capt (later Major) Robert Orlando Rodolph Kenyon-Slaney (1892–1965), from whom she divorced in 1930, and, secondly, in 1930 to Sir John Gilmour, 2nd Baronet. With her first husband, she had three children, and with her second husband one son.
- Lady Cynthia Elinor Beatrix Hamilton (16 August 1897 – 4 December 1972), who married in 1919 Albert Spencer, 7th Earl Spencer (1892–1975). They had three children. By their son, they became grandparents of Diana, Princess of Wales.
- Lady Katherine Hamilton (1900–1985), who married in 1930 Lt.-Col. Sir Reginald Henry Seymour (1878–1938), a descendant of the 1st Marquess of Hertford.
- James Edward Hamilton, 4th Duke of Abercorn (1904–1979)
- Lord Claud David Hamilton (1907–1968), who worked as a barrister in the Inner Temple, and who, in 1946, married Genesta Mary Heath. He was her third husband; they had no children.

Abercorn died at his London home on 12 September 1953, and was buried at Baronscourt in County Tyrone.

== Arms ==
Coat of arms of James Hamilton, 3rd Duke of Abercorn

Crest
Out of a ducal coronet or an oak, fructed and penetrated transversely in the main stem by a frame-saw proper, the blade inscribed with the word "Though"
Escutcheon
Quartcrly: 1st and 4th gules three cinquefoils pierced ermine (Hamilton); 2nd and 3rd, argent a ship with sails furled and ours in action sable (Earls of Arran); in the point of honour over all, an escutcheon azure, charged with three fleur-de-lis or. and surmounted by a French ducal coronet (Châtellerault)
Supporters
Two antelopes argent, armed, unguled, ducally gorged and chained or
Motto
Though and Sola Nobilitas Virtus (Virtue is the only nobility)

== Notes ==
Parliament of the United Kingdom
Preceded by Arthur John Moore	Member of Parliament for Londonderry City; 1900–1913	Succeeded by David Cleghorn Hogg
Political offices
Preceded by Victor Cavendish	Treasurer of the Household; 1903–1905	Succeeded by Sir Edward Strachey, Bt
New office	Governor of Northern Ireland; 1922–1945	Succeeded by The Earl Granville
Honorary titles
Preceded by Edward Archdale	Lord Lieutenant of Tyrone; 1917–1945	Succeeded by James Ponsonby Galbraith
Peerage of Ireland
Preceded by James Hamilton	Duke of Abercorn; 1913–1953	Succeeded by James Hamilton
