= History of the Orange Order =

The Loyal Orange Institution, better known as the Orange Order, is a Protestant fraternal order based in Northern Ireland. It has been a strong supporter of Irish unionism and has had close links with the Ulster Unionist Party, which governed Northern Ireland from 1922 to 1972. The Orange Order has lodges throughout Ireland, although it is strongest in the North. There are also branches throughout the Commonwealth (especially in Scotland and Canada), and in the United States. In the 20th century, the organisation went into sharp decline outside Northern Ireland and County Donegal. The Order has a substantial fraternal and benevolent component.

== Background ==
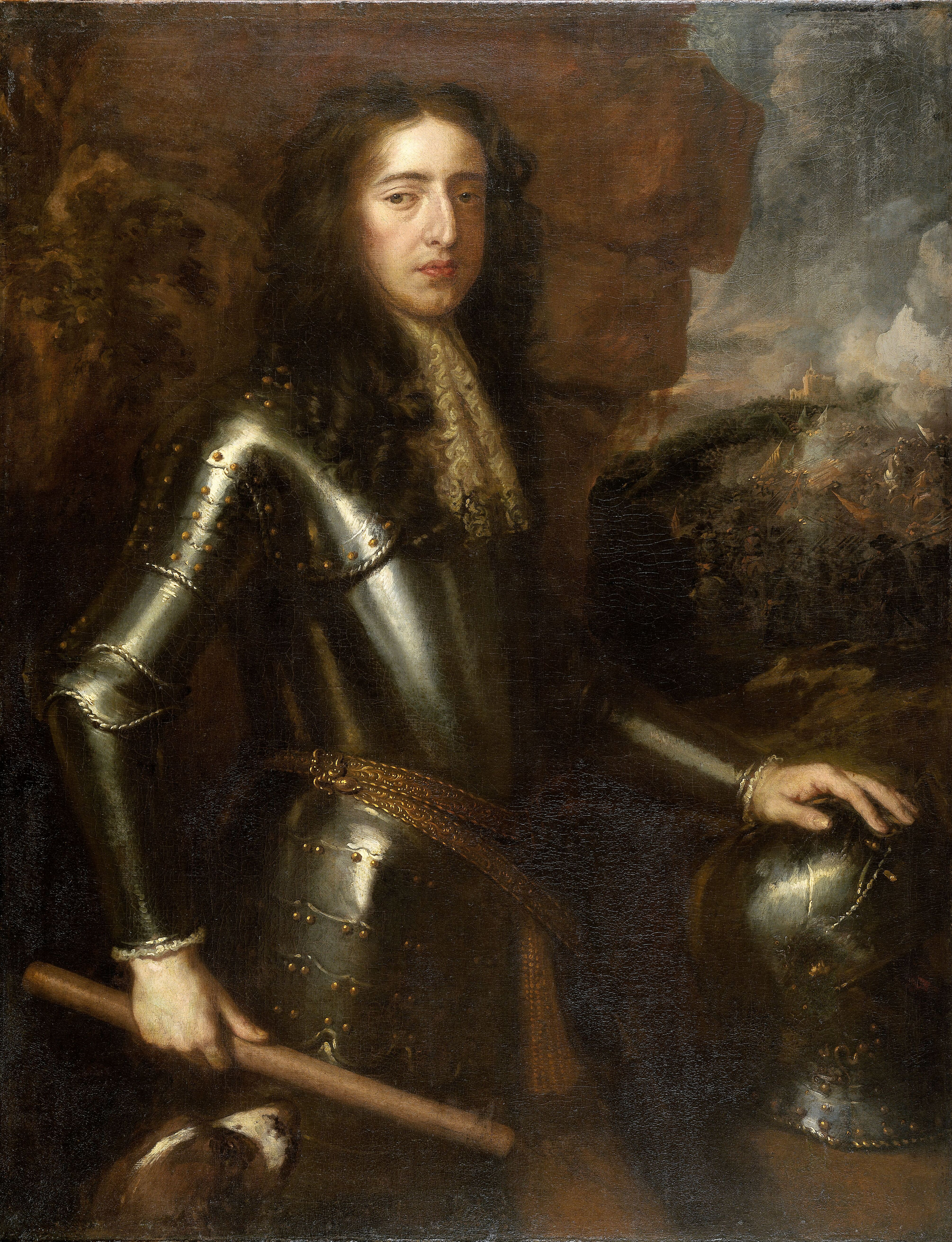
William III ("William of Orange") King of England, Scotland and Ireland, Stadtholder of the Netherlands

The Orange Order arose out of the divisions between Catholics and Protestants in Ireland. Sixteenth century attempts by the English to impose Protestantism on the Irish had been largely unsuccessful, and so the Irish-speaking majority in Ireland, consisting of Gaelic Irish and the descendants of medieval Hiberno-Norman settlers, remained Catholic, in contrast to the post-Reformation Planters from Britain, who were mostly Protestant. In the early seventeenth century the English, partly in response to an uprising based in Ulster, settled large numbers of English and Scottish Protestants in the province, a process known as the Plantation of Ulster. This changed Ulster from the most Catholic and Gaelic of the four Irish provinces to the most Protestant and British, although many Catholics remained. The two communities feared and resented each other, and when James II of England was overthrown by William of Orange in 1688 most Irish Catholics (in Ulster and elsewhere) continued to support James while the Protestants supported William. After initially fleeing to France, James arrived in Ireland in 1689 with French troops and money provided by Louis XIV, who was at war with William. James' supporters (Jacobites) controlled most of Ireland, with the exception of Ulster. Here the Protestants held out for William, especially at Enniskillen and Derry, which were besieged by Jacobite forces. General Frederick Schomberg, 1st Duke of Schomberg and a small army were sent by William to Ireland, but they failed to make progress against the Jacobites. In 1690 William came to Ireland himself, and soon defeated James in the Battle of the Boyne. James fled again to France and although the Williamite War in Ireland was not resolved until the following year, William had achieved a decisive victory over James.

In England, William's overthrow of James is remembered as the Glorious Revolution, so-called because in that country there was little bloodshed, and because it established significant limits on royal power. For many years the Revolution was seen as a major turning point in English and world history, as an important step towards democracy and against arbitrary government. In Ireland, William's victory signalled the beginning of the Protestant Ascendancy. Although the Treaty of Limerick negotiated at the end of the war was in some ways generous towards the defeated Catholics, it was not properly ratified and was repeatedly broken by the Protestant-controlled Parliament of Ireland. Ironically, the increased powers won for parliament in the Revolution meant that William was unable to prevent it from overturning the promises he had made in the Treaty. The subsequent Penal Laws barred Irish Catholics from most aspects of public life and reduced many to poverty. Although there were no uprisings or wars in Ireland in the hundred years after the Battle of the Boyne, there continued to be tension and some conflict between the Protestant and Catholic communities.

== Foundation of the Order ==
Under the influence of the United Irishmen, according to T. A. Jackson, political unity was replacing sectarian divisions in Ulster. This he says inspired "public-spirited zeal" in Catholic areas with areas like Armagh where the population had been evenly divided and the scene of sporadic violence between the Peep O'Day Boys and Catholic Defenders for years dying down to nothing under the influence of the United Irish. However, with the arrival of the new pro-Catholic Viceroy, Earl Fitzwilliam the Peep of Day boys resumed their activity after nearly a two-year absence. Jackson suggests that it is impossible to miss the connection between this fact, and the lie propagated by the Clare-Beresford faction that Fitzwilliam was there to replace the Protestant ascendancy with a Catholic one. With Defenders, again in action, he says, every successful defence against Peep of Day attack being then portrayed as a "Catholic outrage." This "artificially worked-up pogrom" would culminate in what came to be known as the Battle of the Diamond. In the aftermath of the "battle" which occurred on 21 September 1795 the Orange Society was founded, with the first Orange lodge established in Dyan, County Tyrone. Its first grand master was James Sloan of Loughgall, in whose inn the victory by the Peep O'Day Boys was celebrated.

According to Robert Kee, the Peep O'Day Boys would reorganise under the name the Orange Society, which he described as a crude organisation at the time. However, Ruth Dudley-Edwards has stated that, "The traditional belief that Peep O' Day Boys founded the Orange Order ... does not bear scrutiny." Dudley-Edwards, Mervyn Jess and Colonel Robert Hugh Wallace, a former Grand Master of the Belfast Orangemen, have suggested that the Orange Boys and the Volunteers seem to have been the true forerunners of the Orange Institution. Wallace states the Peep O' Day Boys were never a properly organised group and moreover continued to operate of their own accord after the formation of the Orange Institution.

James Wilson was joined by Daniel Winter and James Sloan. The infant Orange Order according to Wallace, had both Presbyterian and Anglican members. The colour orange had long been a popular symbol with which to celebrate the victory of William of Orange over James II a century before. The Orange Order proper was founded in Loughgall in County Armagh 21 September 1795 in the aftermath of this Battle of the Diamond.

Many of the Orange Order's terms and language are derived from Freemasonry (e.g. lodge, grand master, and degrees.) The two movements have since grown apart; today the highest bodies in Freemasonry specifically deny any connection between the two institutions.

== Early years ==
Much of the Order's early activities involved opposition to the Society of United Irishmen, a revolutionary organisation set up to abolish sectarian distinctions and to create an independent Irish republic. It was composed of Anglicans, Dissenters (i.e., non-Anglican Protestants, mainly Presbyterian), and Roman Catholics. The United Irishmen were violently opposed by the Orange Order.

The Governor of Armagh, Lord Gosford, gave his opinion of the late 18th century disturbances to a meeting of magistrates: "It is no secret that a persecution is now raging in this country... the only crime is... profession of the Roman Catholic faith. Lawless banditti have constituted themselves judges..." According to Col. R.H. Wallace, whoever the Governor believed were the "lawless banditti" they could not have been Orangemen as there were no lodges in existence at the time of his speech. Against the background of the seditious activity of the United Irishmen, the government backed the Orange Order from 1796. Thomas Knox, British military commander in Ulster, wrote in August 1796, "We must to a certain degree uphold them, for with all their licentiousness, on them we must rely for the preservation of our lives and properties should critical times occur."

The Order spread rapidly in mid-Ulster and many Orangemen found their way into the government militia and Yeomanry. For their part, the United Irishmen exacerbated Catholic fear of the Order by spreading fabricated rumours of an "Orange extermination oath" to massacre all Catholics. Nevertheless, Protestant factions did expel up to 7000 Catholics from their homes in this period and by 1797, Henry Joy McCracken, the United Irish leader, was receiving word of the "barbarities committed on the country people in Moneymore, County Londonderry, by the Yeomen and Orangemen."

Orange historians state that the first Orangemen did not sympathise with the Peep of Day Boys or "wreckers" (of Catholic homes and churches) and never allowed them to join the Orange Institution. Others have stated that some Peep of Day Boys might have "slipped through the net" but if so they found themselves in a vastly different organisation.

Many Orangemen fought on the government side in the subsequent Irish Rebellion of 1798. Moreover, there were accusations that the Order was involved in reprisal attacks after the rebellion, in which over 60 Catholic churches were burned. However Orange historians would point out that in County Antrim Orangemen were among the first to contribute money to a repair fund for a Catholic chapel damaged in the violence.

On April 9, 1798, the Grand Orange Lodge of Ireland was formally established on Dawson Street, Dublin to oversee the regiona county lodges and districts across the island of Ireland.

One of the earliest documented women's Orange Lodge warrants was issued in May 1801. Warrant No. 8 approved a lodge to operate in Bray, County Wicklow. It was granted to Mrs. Letitia Saunders by Ann Smith, who served as Mistress of the Female Orange Lodge located on Cuffe Street in Dublin.

The first formally established English institution was in Manchester in 1807. The Grand Orange Lodge of England was formed the following year in May. The first Grand Master was Samuel Taylor, who served as a soldier in the Irish Rebellion of 1798.

In some areas, particularly around Liverpool, it was used by the Tories against the Liberals. The Order also spread to the United States, and Tim Pat Coogan argues that it "manifested itself" in movements as the Know Nothings and the Ku Klux Klan, and also proved useful to employers as a device for keeping Protestant and Catholic workers from "uniting for better wages and conditions."

In July 1866, the first ever international Orange Conference was held at Belfast Orange Hall, this meeting led to the formation of the Imperial Orange Council. The Orange Council meet on a triennial basis, with delegates from Grand Orange Lodges around the world in attendance for the meetings.

== Conflict and suppression ==
In the early 19th century, much of the Order's activities were bound up with violent conflict with the Ribbonmen, a Catholic secret society.

A report from the time says:

"The 26th July, 1813 is memorable as the day on which a conflict occurred between Loyalists and Ribbonmen. The latter, who assembled to the number of 1500, attacked the house of a resident named Davidson, where the Orange Lodges were in the habit of meeting. The owner of the doomed premises, warned of their intentions, had a few trusty friends at hand to lend any necessary assistance. Three of the Ribbonmen were killed outright, while others, mortally wounded, died soon after. This did not end the trouble because a month later twelve men from the neighbourhood of Garvagh were charged before Judge Fletcher at Derry for murder. Three of the accused were acquitted and the others found guilty of manslaughter."

Of the acquittal a song says, "The Judge he then would us condemn Had it not been for the jurymen Our grateful thanks are due to them For they cleared the boys of Garvagh." The Ribbonmen were found guilty but were acquitted at a later assizes when it was stated "that both parties had become reconciled and were ready to give bail for their future good behaviour."

The Orange Order, along with other organisations, was banned between 1823 and 1845 by the British government because of its involvement in sectarian violence in Ulster. Although they were then illegal the parades continued. In 1829, seven people were killed during disturbances in Clones, County Monaghan, and eight in Enniskillen, County Fermanagh. The first Orange-related disturbances in Scotland were reported in 1830.

In 1835, a Parliamentary Committee set up to investigate the activities of the Order heard from a local magistrate, William Hancock, that:

"For some time past the peaceable inhabitants of the parish of Drumcree have been insulted and outraged by large bodies of Orangemen parading the highways, playing party tunes, firing shots, and using the most opprobrious epithets they could invent... a body of Orangemen marched through the town and proceeded to Drumcree church, passing by the Catholic chapel though it was a considerable distance out of their way."

In 1836, the British Army used artillery to quell trouble at the annual gathering at Scarva, County Down.

Many Orange songs of the 19th century period suggest that the Royal Irish Constabulary were sympathetic to the Thrashers and turned a blind eye to numerous skirmishes in County Down. In July 1849 near Castlewellan, County Down there was a skirmish shortly before the Battle of Dolly's Brae. This 'battle' took place on 12 July 1849 as the result of a parading dispute. At least 30 Catholics were killed in clashes between Ribbonmen and Orangemen. The British government banned Orange Order marches again after this incident. The Grand Master of the Order, Lord Roden, was forced to resign his position as a justice of the peace after it emerged that he incited the Orangemen before the incident at a gathering hosted on his estate nearby.

== Revival ==
By the later 19th century, the Order was in decline. However, its fortunes were revived by the spread of Protestant opposition to Irish nationalist mobilisation in the Irish Land League and then around the question of Home Rule. Some Protestants perceived the Land War (sometimes violent agitation for the rights of tenant farmers) to be anti-Protestant, as most of the Land-owning class were Protestants. As a result, the Orange Order, in October 1880, sent 50 labourers from counties Cavan and Monaghan to work the lands of Captain Charles Boycott (who was being boycotted by his own tenants) in County Mayo. They also established the Orange Emergency Committee in 1881, to oppose the Land League and to help landlords. These actions gave the Order greater appeal among the Ulster Protestant landed gentry and business community.

The Order's revival was completed by the controversy over Home Rule (or self-government for Ireland), which it virulently opposed on the grounds that Protestants would face discrimination in a Catholic dominated Ireland. Many of the Order's backers were also industrialists and valued the economic common market which the Act of Union guaranteed with Britain. In 1886, the Order was instrumental in the foundation of the Unionist Party, a coalition of former Liberal and Conservative Members of Parliament and an organisation named the Ulster Loyalist Anti-Repeal Union, to oppose the first Home Rule Bill. Between them, the Orange Order and the Unionist Party became mass organisations in Ulster, gaining the support of much of the Protestant population there. In 1886, William Ewart Gladstone's Home Rule Bill was before Parliament. The Bill was defeated in June, and serious rioting broke out in Ulster, continuing on into the marching season in July. By September, fifty people were dead, and thousands had been driven from their homes.

In 1894, the Order and the Unionists successfully opposed the Second Home Rule Bill, which was passed in the House of Commons but rejected by the House of Lords. British Prime Minister William Gladstone hinted at this time that special provision might need to be made for Ulster, a proposal that prefigured the subsequent Partition of Ireland.

In the first decade of the twentieth century, the Order suffered a split, when Thomas Sloan left the organisation to set up the Independent Orange Order. Sloan had been suspended from the main Order after running against a Unionist candidate on a pro-labour platform in an election in 1902. The Independent Orange Order was initially more left wing than its parent organisation. By 1905, it had over 70 Lodges. However, its appeal was hurt by the suggestion of its first grand master, Lindsay Crawford, that unionists might accept Home Rule under certain circumstances. It later became associated with more traditional unionist politics, but remained critical of the close relationship between the Orange Order and the Unionist Party.

== Global expansion ==
=== Africa ===
The earliest African lodge was founded in Freetown, Sierra Leone, when the city was a British Crown Colony.

The first Orange lodge in Nigeria, Lagos Fine Blues Loyal Orange Lodge No. 801, was founded in Lagos in the late 19th century. A women’s lodge was also established there soon after.

The first Orange lodge in Nigeria, Lagos Fine Blues (Loyal Orange Lodge No. 801), was founded in Lagos in the late 19th century. A women’s lodge — the first known in Africa — was also established there soon after. Membership quickly expanded to include Nigerian teachers and converts associated with Anglican, Methodist, and Presbyterian missions, whose Protestant and pro-British outlook aligned with Orange principles.

European Orangemen later established lodges in Calabar, and Port Harcourt. By 1919, leadership had passed fully to Nigerians under Grand Master E. A. Ojo, and by the 1920s, the Orange Order in Nigeria was entirely African made up of natives.

In 1994, Emmanuel Aboki Essien became the first African to serve as President of the Imperial Orange Council.

=== North America ===
The Order also established lodges in the United States during the early 19th century, initially among Protestant Irish communities in cities such as New York, Philadelphia, and Pittsburgh.

The first recorded Orange lodge on the continent was founded in Montreal in 1800 by members of a British Army regiment. William Burton became its first Grand Master after obtaining the warrant from Ireland.

By the mid-19th century, the Order had become a major and political force in Canada..

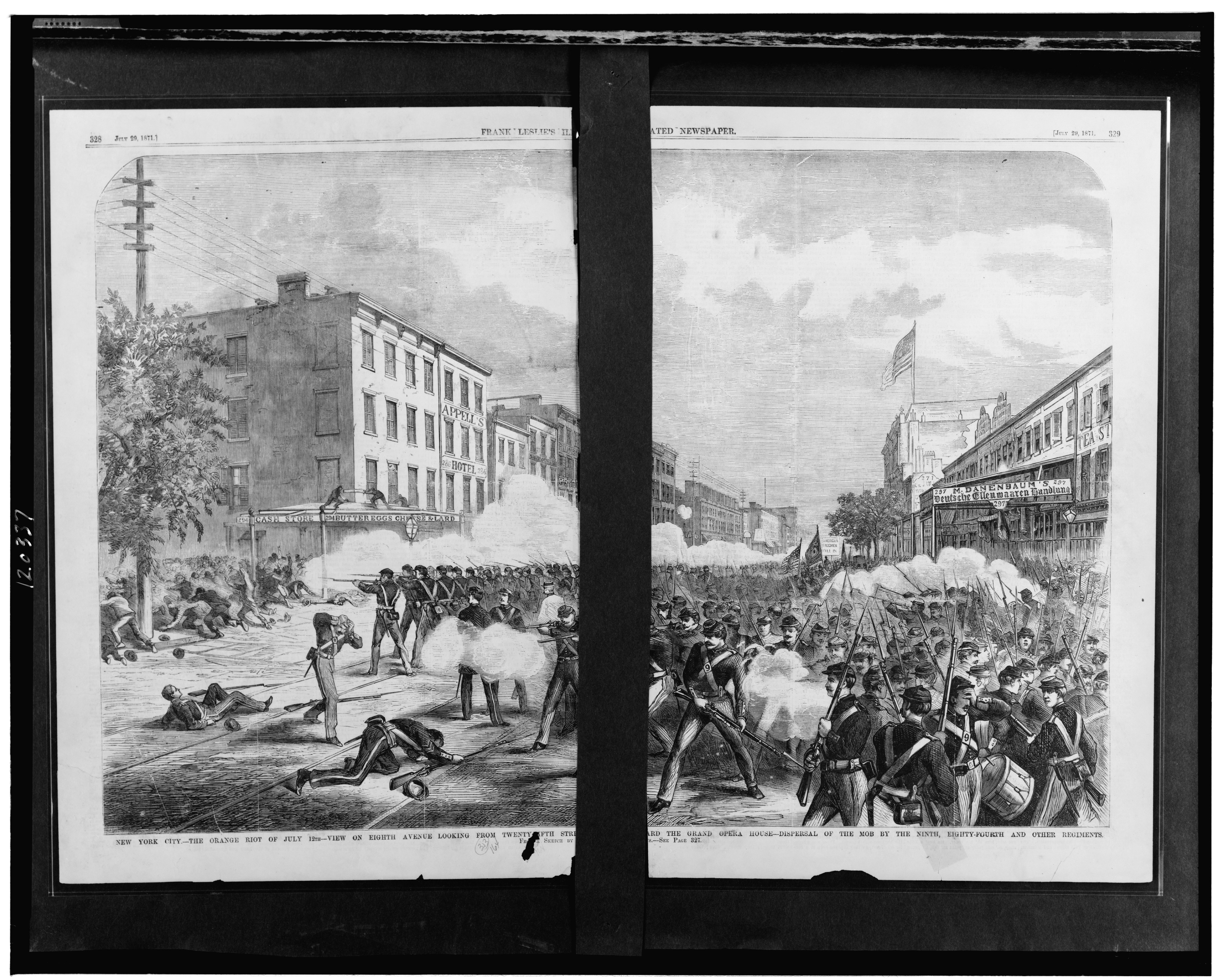
The Orange Riot on the Twelfth of July 1871 in Manhattan - view on Eighth Avenue looking from Twenty-Fifth Street.

In January 1870, the Supreme Grand Orange Lodge of the United States was formally established, when the Grand Orange Lodge of Ireland accepted the request to charter the Grand Orange Lodge. The request was made by who would become the first US Grand Master John H. Bond. Bond acknowledged the receipt of the warrant. The Grand Lodge of the United States was established in 1870. This was approved by the Grand Orange Lodge of Ireland.

The newly established Grand Orange Lodge held the Twelfth of July parade in Manhattan, New York that year. Irish Catholic counter-protesters clashed with the NYPD, Orangemen and marching bands, resulting in the first year of the Orange riots, leaving 8 fatalities. The following year's Twelfth parade resulted in another day of rioting, resulting in more fatalities, when 60 civilians were killed and over 150 injured, included militia at the scene and police officers. The 1871 riot broke-out outside Lamartine Hall, the US Grand Orange Lodge headquarters on Eighth Avenue.

=== Oceania ===
The earliest documented Orange lodge met in Auckland in 1842 under District Warrant No. 1707, which had been brought to the colony by James Carlton Hill, a former District Master from County Wicklow. The first recorded meeting of the Order in New Zealand was held at the Osprey Inn in Auckland in 1843.

On 26 December 1867, the Grand Orange Lodge of Ireland constituted the Grand Orange Lodge of the North Island. In 1870, the first Orange lodge was established in the South Island, and the Grand Orange Lodge of the South Island was subsequently constituted by the Irish Grand Lodge. The first Twelfth of July procession took place in 1877 in Auckland.

The Grand Orange Lodge of New Zealand was established in 1908 following the amalgamation of the North and South Island Grand Orange Lodges.

The Grand Orange Lodge of Australia is the national governing body of the Orange Order in Australia, and was established in 1845. The first lodge was established in Melbourne in 1843.

In March 1868, Irish nationalist Henry James O’Farrell tried to assassinate the visiting Duke of Edinburgh Prince Alfred in Sydney. The Orange Order seized on the subsequent wave of anti-Irish and anti-Catholic panic, sparking a massive surge in lodge membership.

== Role in the partition of Ireland ==
In 1912, the Third Home Rule Bill was passed in the British House of Commons (though it was held up by the House of Lords for two further years). The Orange Order, along with Irish Unionists and the British Conservative Party, were forthright in opposing the Bill. The Order organised the 1912 Ulster Covenant a pledge to oppose Home Rule that was signed by up to 500,000 people.

In addition, in 1911 some Orangemen in County Tyrone had begun to arm themselves and engage in military training with the intention of resisting Home Rule. To facilitate this, several Justices of the Peace revived an old law permitting the formation of militias "for the purpose of maintaining the constitution of the United Kingdom as now established." This practice spread to other Orange lodges under the name Ulster Volunteers, and in 1913 the Ulster Unionist Council decided to bring these groups under central control, creating the Ulster Volunteer Force, a militia dedicated to resisting Home Rule. There was a strong overlap between Orange Lodges and UVF units. A large shipment of rifles was imported from Germany to arm them in April 1914 in what became known as the Larne Gun Running. Civil war looked likely to break out between the Ulster Volunteers and the nationalist Irish Volunteers. However, the crisis was interrupted by the outbreak of World War I in August 1914 and the temporary suspension of the Home Rule Act placed on the statute books with Royal Assent. Many Orangemen served in the war with the 36th (Ulster) Division suffering heavy losses and commemorations of their sacrifice are still an important element of Orange ceremonies.

After the war, the island of Ireland became embroiled in the Irish War of Independence (1919–1921), which pitted the Irish Republican Army (the I.R.A.) against British Crown forces. The Orange Order appealed for Protestant unity in this period, condemning militant labour action such as strike for a 40-hour week in Belfast in 1919. In addition, some members of the Order were involved in paramilitary activities against nationalists. The leader of the Ulster Volunteer Force, Colonel Wilfrid Spender, wrote to Sir James Craig, 1st Bt., in 1920, "Some of the Orange Lodges have decided that the UVF is too slow and have decided to raise a special force of their own." Many Orangemen were subsequently recruited into the Ulster Special Constabulary, an Auxiliary, mostly Protestant police force. Many of them were allegedly involved in attacks on Catholics, in which over 350 people were killed in the period 1920–1922.

The Fourth Home Rule Act was passed as the Government of Ireland Act 1920, the north eastern part of Ulster being partitioned from Southern Ireland as Northern Ireland. This new self-governing entity within the United Kingdom was confirmed under the terms of the Anglo-Irish Treaty of 1921. Southern Ireland became the Irish Free State in December 1922, then, in December 1937, it became Éire. This independent Irish state has been popularly known (in English) as the Republic of Ireland since it left the Commonwealth in April 1949.

== In Northern Ireland ==
The Orange Order had a central place in the new state of Northern Ireland. It acted as a basis for the unity of Protestants of all classes and as a mass social and political grouping. At its peak in 1965, the Order's membership was around 70,000, which meant that roughly 1 in 5 adult Protestant males were members.

It had very close ties to the ruling Unionist Party and the senior leadership of both frequently overlapped. Lord Craigavon said in 1934, "I am an Orangeman first and a politician and a member of parliament second." Membership of the Order was also useful in obtaining jobs and public housing. The Order's principal commemoration on 12 July was made a public holiday and in effect, Northern Ireland's national day.

The Orange Order began to lose influence in the 1960s, when it came into conflict with a movement towards modernisation and a reduction in sectarianism led by Captain Terence O'Neill, the Prime Minister of Northern Ireland. Although the Order's leadership remained supportive of O'Neill as a fellow Orangeman, many rank and file members opposed his programme and his supporters suffered heckling at Orange Order events. One MP, George Forrest, was kicked unconscious by spectators at the 1967 Twelfth. Cabinet minister Phelim O'Neill quit the Order rather than have it discipline him over his attendance at a Catholic ceremony, becoming one of only four Stormont Cabinet ministers in history not to belong to the Order. The Order was also challenged from the other side by The Rev. Ian Paisley and his followers, who accused the Order of being insufficiently opposed to Catholicism, humanism and ecumenism. Since 1965, membership has gone into decline, notably in Belfast and Derry. There was a membership spike following the beginning of The Troubles, but most new members who signed up did not remain long.

The Order's political influence suffered greatly when the Unionist-dominated Stormont parliament was prorogued in 1972. Since then the Order has existed primarily as a pressure group, although many Ulster Unionist Party MPs and officials are members of the Order. The Order also suffered considerably in the Troubles, although the majority of murdered Orangemen were killed as members of the security forces rather than as Orangemen per se. Numerous Orange halls have been subject to arson and other vandalism, with some requiring heavy security and being uninsurable. As nationalists gained increased power within Northern Ireland, the Order became less able to parade along many of its traditional routes through Catholic neighbourhoods. This issue has led to considerable verbal and physical conflict both within the Order and between the Order and other groups, especially concerning the Drumcree conflict in Portadown.

In 1973, the Grand Orange Lodge of Ireland launched The Orange Standard, a newspaper covering news both locally and around the world involving Orangeism, Unionism and Protestantism. In 1971, the Grand Lodge held a committee to combat against biased news reporting against them and needed a voice to support Unionism. Key figures for the newspapers launch included Dr Samuel Ernest Long and Dougie Sloan. In 2017, The Orange Standard became available in digital format as an option. In 2023, they digitised the earlier editions of the newspaper to mark the 50th anniversary.

Traditionally, the Orange Order was affiliated with the institutions of establishment Unionism: the Ulster Unionist Party and Church of Ireland. It had a fractious relationship with the Democratic Unionist Party, Independent Orange Order and the Free Presbyterian Church; at times discouraging their members from joining these organizations.

To this day, according to Tim Pat Coogan, Orangemen still overlook the Papal input to the creation of their icon William of Orange. However at least one Orange publication has mentioned the Pope's support for William, and so it would be wrong to assume that Orangemen in general are ignorant of the Pope's role.

In 2015, through a joint project supported by a £3.6 million European Union PEACE III grant, the Grand Orange Lodge of Ireland and the County Armagh Grand Orange Lodge opened two Museum of Orange Heritage sites featuring new interpretive centers at Schomberg House in Cregagh, Belfast and Sloan's House in Loughgall.

In 2017, the inaugural Orange Heritage Week was launched. It runs on the last week in September, beginning on Diamond Day (anniversary of the Battle of the Diamond and formation of the Orange Order) and culminating on Ulster Day (anniversary of the signing of the Ulster Covenant). A series of events including fun days, lectures, exhibitions and festivals are held throughout Northern Ireland.

In 2018, the Orange Order began to dedicate 1 September as Orange Victims Day to remember members of the Institution who lost their lives during the Troubles. Regional parades are held in commemoration followed by a church service.

== Military contributions ==
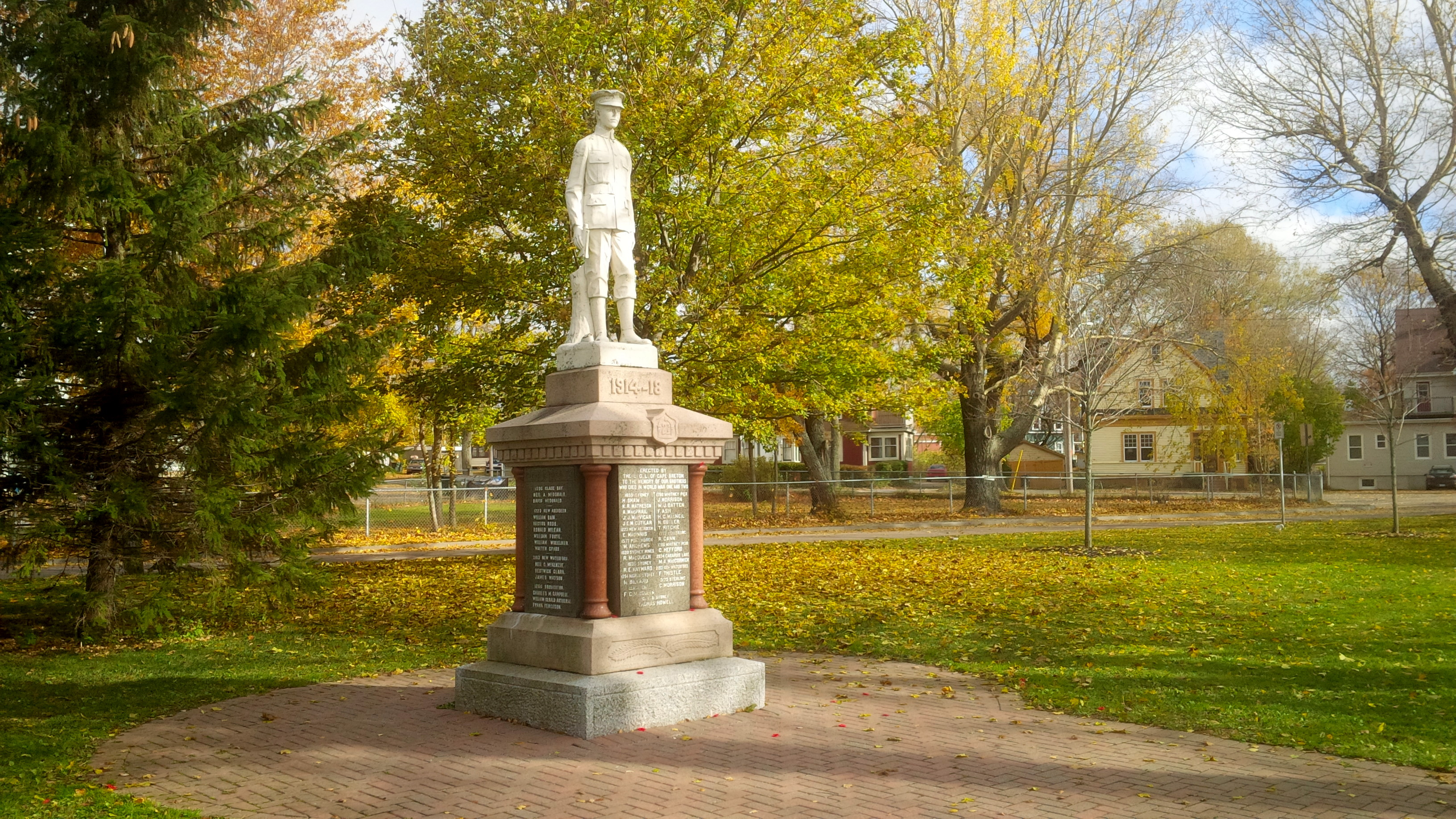
Orangemen War Memorial in Wentworth Park, Sydney, Nova Scotia

Orangemen have fought in numerous wars, including the War of 1812, the Crimean War, the Indian Rebellion of 1857 and the Second Boer War. Able Seaman Bro William George Vincent Williams of LOL 92 Melbourne, was the first Australian to be killed in the war.

The Order's most notable military contribution was on the first day (1 July) of the Battle of the Somme, 1916. Many Orangemen had joined the 36th (Ulster) Division which had been formed from various Ulster regiments and had also amalgamated Sir Edward Carson's Ulster Volunteers (who were formed to oppose Home Rule for Ireland) into its ranks. But for the outbreak of World War I, Ireland had been on the brink of civil war, as Orangemen had helped to smuggle thousands of rifles from Imperial Germany (see Larne Gun Running). Several hundred Glasgow Orangemen crossed to Belfast in September 1914, to join the 36th (Ulster) Division. Roughly 5000 members of the Division were casualties on the first day of the battle.

Orangemen also fought in World War II and subsequent conflicts, and many served in the Ulster Defence Regiment during the Northern Irish Troubles, particularly during the 1970s and 1980s.

At least five Orangemen have been awarded the Victoria Cross: George Richardson, in the Indian Mutiny; Robert Hanna, Robert Quigg and Abraham Acton during World War I; and Rev. John Weir Foote in World War II.

In 1996, the Grand Orange Lodge of Ireland established a memorisl Orange lodge named Thiepval Memorial LOL No. 1916. It was created to mark the 80th anniversary of the Battle of the Somme. A memorial bench was placed at the Ulster Tower in Thiepval, France.

In Canada, approximately 80,000 Canadian Orangemen volunteered for service during the First World War, with over 55,000 fighting overseas.

In Australia, many Australian Orangemen join the First Australian Imperial Force during World War I. They are commemorated with an honour roll in the Army Museum of Western Australia.

Numerous lodges have been formed by serving soldiers during various conflicts, with varying levels of official approval. In September 2007 there was controversy when a photograph of British soldiers in Iraq, wearing Orange sashes and carrying a banner reading 'Rising Sons of Basra', appeared in the Ulster Volunteer Force magazine The Purple Standard.

== See also ==
- Orange Heritage Week
- Orange Order in Canada
- Orange Order in the United States
- Orange Order in New Zealand
- Orange Order in Australia
- Orange Order in Africa
- Orange Order in the Republic of Ireland
- Orange Order in Scotland
- Grand Orange Lodge of England
- List of Grand Orange Lodges
- Eleventh Night
- Royal Arch Purple
- Ulster Scots people
- Orange Riots New York City, in 1870 and 1871; Irish Catholics attacked Orange parades
