= YCV =

YCV can mean several things:

- IATA airport code for the Cartierville Airport in Saint-Laurent, Quebec.
- Young Citizen Volunteers (disambiguation), multiple uses
- YCV is also an acronym for the Yonsei Computer Volunteers, an extracurricular organization in Yonsei University, South Korea, which has been devoted to the assistance of Yonsei University students' use of personal computer and the maintenance of computer labs in the school.
- A US Navy hull classification symbol: Aircraft transportation barge (YCV)
