= William McFadzean =

British recipient of the Victoria Cross (1895–1916)

William McFadzean VC
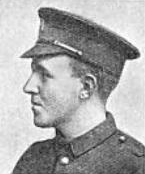
- Born: 9 October 1895; Lurgan, County Armagh, Ireland
- Died: 1 July 1916 (aged 20); Thiepval, France
- Military career
- Allegiance: United Kingdom
- Branch: British Army
- Service years: 1914–1916
- Rank: Private
- Nickname: "Billy"
- Units: 14th Battalion, The Royal Irish Rifles
- Conflicts: First World War: Battle of the Somme; First day on the Somme †
- Awards: Victoria Cross

William Frederick McFadzean VC (9 October 1895 – 1 July 1916) was a British recipient of the Victoria Cross (VC), the highest and most prestigious award for gallantry in the face of the enemy that can be awarded to British and Commonwealth forces. He was posthumously awarded the VC for his actions on the opening day of the Battle of the Somme.

== Early life ==
William Frederick McFadzean was born in Lurgan in County Armagh, Ireland on 9 October 1895. His parents, William McFadzean and his wife Annie Pedlow née Bowden, were from Belfast and lived in the suburb of Cregagh. Known as "Billy", he was educated at Mountpottinger National School and then the Trade Preparatory School of the Municipal Technical Institute.

A keen sportsman and standing 6 feet 0 inches (1.83 metres) tall, McFadzean played rugby union for Collegians RFC. After completing his schooling, McFadzean worked for a manufacturer of linen. He was also interested in the military, and was a member of the East Belfast Regiment of the Ulster Volunteers and the Young Citizens Volunteers.

== First World War ==
Shortly after the outbreak of the First World War, members of the Ulster division were urged to join the British Army to form an infantry division. McFadzean enlisted in the 14th Battalion of The Royal Irish Rifles as a private. The regiment was to form part of the 36th (Ulster) Division. After completing training, firstly at Finner Camp in Ireland and then Seaforth in England, McFadzean and his regiment embarked for the Western Front in October 1915.

The 36th Division was stationed near Thiepval Wood from March 1916 and would be involved in the upcoming Battle of the Somme, for which it was tasked with advancing to Grandcourt. In the early hours of 1 July 1916, McFadzean's battalion was assembled in Thiepval Wood in preparation for the advance. While an artillery barrage on the opposing German trenches was in progress, he was one of the bombardiers priming supplies of hand grenades. In handling a box of grenades, the box fell into a crowded trench and two of the grenades' safety pins were dislodged. McFadzean threw himself on top of them before they exploded, killing him but injuring only one other. For his action, he was posthumously awarded the Victoria Cross (VC). The VC, instituted in 1856, was the highest award for valour that could be bestowed on a soldier of the British Empire. The citation, published in the London Gazette read:

No. 14/18278 Pte. William Frederick McFadzean, late R. Ir. Rif. For most conspicuous bravery. While in a concentration trench and opening a box of bombs for distribution prior to an attack, the box slipped down into the trench, which was crowded with men, and two of the safety pins fell out. Private McFadzean, instantly realising the danger to his comrades, with heroic courage threw himself on the top of the Bombs. The bombs exploded blowing him to pieces, but only one other man was injured. He well knew his danger, being himself a bomber, but without a moment's hesitation he gave his life for his comrades.

— London Gazette, 8 September 1916

Letters of condolences were written to McFadzean's father by the commander of the Ulster Volunteers, Lieutenant Colonel Spencer Chichester, and Colonel F. O. Bowen, the commander of 14th Battalion. King George V also wrote to the family and provided train tickets to travel to the VC investiture at Buckingham Palace. McFadzean was buried in Thiepval Wood; his grave was later lost.

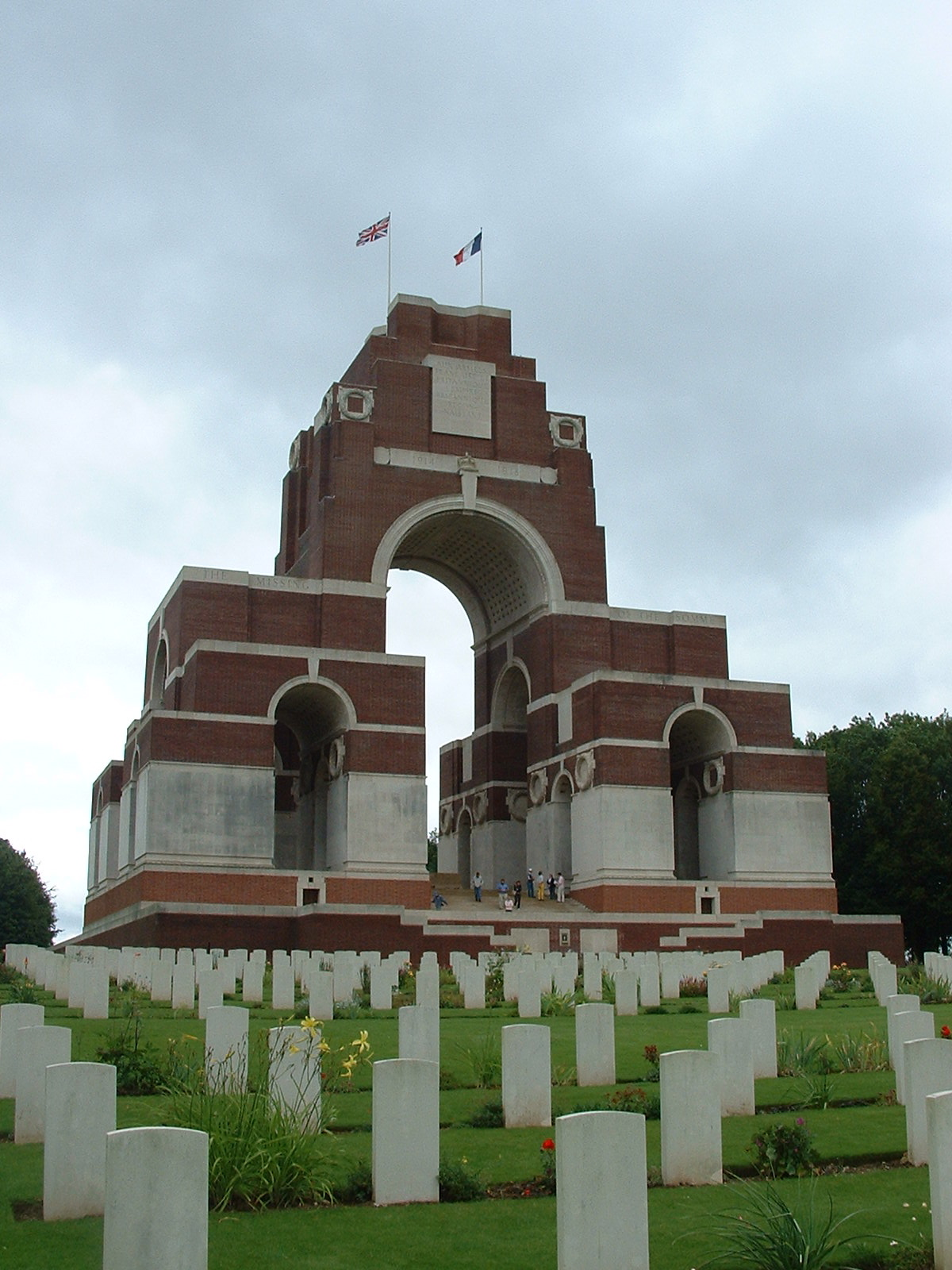
The Thiepval Memorial to the Missing, on which McFadzean's name is listed

== Medal and legacy ==
McFadzean's father was presented with his son's VC by the King in a ceremony at Buckingham Palace on 28 February 1917. The VC is held by the Royal Ulster Rifles Museum, in Belfast.

There are a number of memorials and remembrances of McFadzean, who is the best known of the Ulster Division VC recipients. There is a plaque to him at Newtownbreda Presbyterian Church in Belfast, which also hosted his memorial service on the one year anniversary of his death, and at his parents' house in Cregagh. There is also a mural depicting him in Cregagh and several in Belfast. His name is one of those listed on the memorial stone at the Thiepval Memorial for the VC recipients of the Ulster Division and he is also listed on the memorial tablet for the Royal Irish Rifles at St. Anne's Cathedral at Belfast. He is also commemorated in t-shirts, mugs and death scrolls, while the Ballad of Billy McFadzean is a well-known Loyalist song. On 13 October 2018 the Ancre Somme Association Charity unveiled a bronze bust of McFadzean in Lurgan.
