= SS Clyde Valley =

History
- Name: 1886–1910: SS Balniel; 1910–1912: SS Londoner; 1912–1974: SS ClydeValley
- Owner: 1886–1909: Wigan Coal and Iron Company; 1909–1914: Clydeside Steamship Company; 1914: Hugh Crawford; 1914–1915?: Major Frederick Crawford; 1916–1919: German Army; 1919–1920: Richard J. Cowser, Glasgow; 1920–1927: Norman Canning, Glasgow; 1927–1928: G. Barry, Glasgow; 1928–1940: Colonial Shippers, Guysborough, Nova Scotia; 1940–1943: A.S. Publicover, Luneenburg, Nova Scotia; 1943–1947: Halifax Fisheries, Halifax, Nova Scotia; 1947–1955: Riverport Steamship Company, Halifax, Nova Scotia; 1955–1969: Lake Shipping Company, Halifax, Nova Scotia; 1969–1974: Samuel J. Campbell, Whitehead, County Antrim
- Operator: (owners)
- Port of registry: (United Kingdom)
- Builder: MacIlwaine, Lewis and Company, Belfast
- Launched: 1886
- Out of service: 1974
- Identification: IMO number: 5076509; Official number: 93690
- Fate: Scrapped 1974

General characteristics
- Tonnage: 460 gross register tons (GRT)
- Length: 174 ft (53 m)
- Beam: 26.1 ft (8.0 m)
- Draught: 12.6 ft (3.8 m)
- Installed power: 80 ihp
- Speed: 8 knots

The SS Clyde Valley was a steamship which achieved notoriety for its role in the Larne gun-running in Ireland in April 1914.

== History ==
The ship was built by MacIlwaine, Lewis and Company Ltd; Belfast and launched in 1886 as the SS Balniel for the Wigan Coal and Iron Company. She was named after Lord Balniel, the owner of Wigan Mines. She was sold in 1909 to the Clydeside Steamship Company in Glasgow and in 1910 renamed SS Londoner, and in 1912 renamed again as SS ClydeValley.

In 1914 she was sold to Hugh Crawford and acquired in April of the same year by Major Frederick Crawford on behalf of the Ulster Volunteers she was briefly renamed Mountjoy II and on 24 April 1914 she rendezvoused with the coaster SS Fanny at sea as part of the Larne gun-running operation.

By 1916 she was operating as a German Army Transport but was repatriated in January 1919 by Richard Cowser of Glasgow. She remained in the Glasgow area until 1928 when she was sold to Colonial Shippers of Guysborough, Nova Scotia and used to run coal to Trinidad and bring salt back. In 1934 she was abandoned and left on a sandbank until 1940 when she was acquired by A.S. Publicover of Lunenburg, Nova Scotia. In 1942 her steam propulsion was removed and she was converted to a motor vessel.

Further changes of ownership occurred in Canada, with her passing to Halifax Fisheries in 1943, Riverport Steamship Company in 1946 and Lake Shipping Company in 1955. In 1968.

In 1969 she was acquired by Samuel Campbell of Whitehead, County Antrim with the aim of preserving her. She was moved to Carrickfergus from Sydney, Nova Scotia in the same year. In Sydney, she was in poor condition and set to be scrapped. During the voyage, the vessel was forced to dock in Saint John's, Newfoundland for repairs. Campbell aimed to turn the vessel into a museum ship but the project was unsuccessful, partially due to the troubles in Northern Ireland, and she went to Lancaster to be broken up in 1974.
