= Young Citizen Volunteers (1912) =

Irish civic organisation

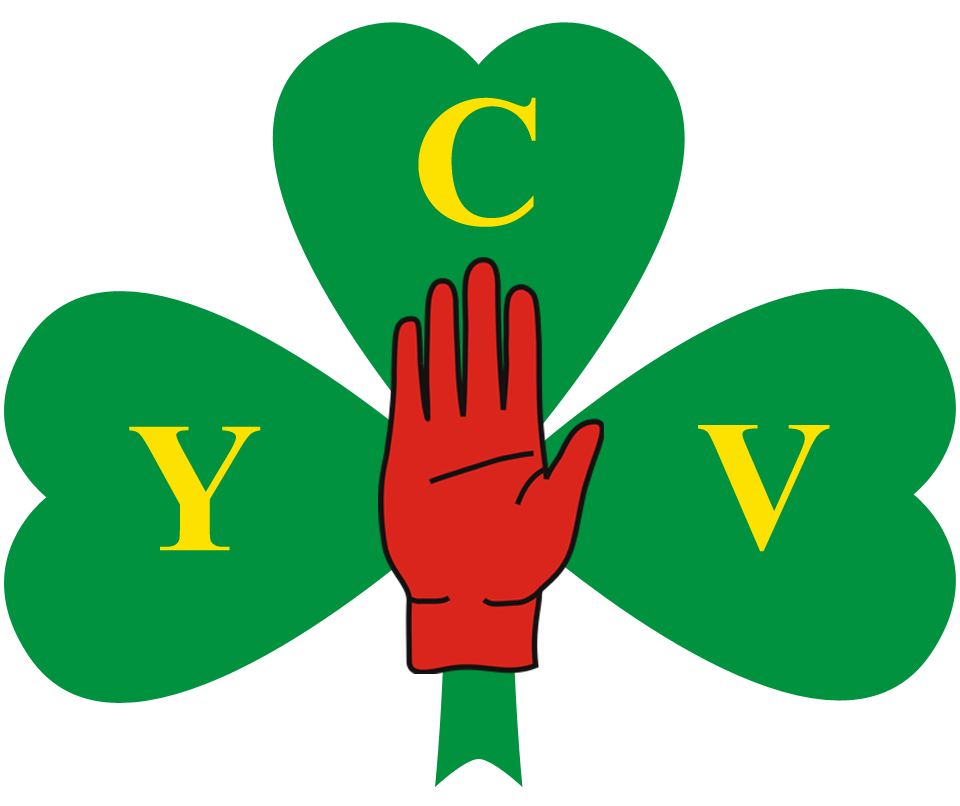
Emblem used by the YCV.

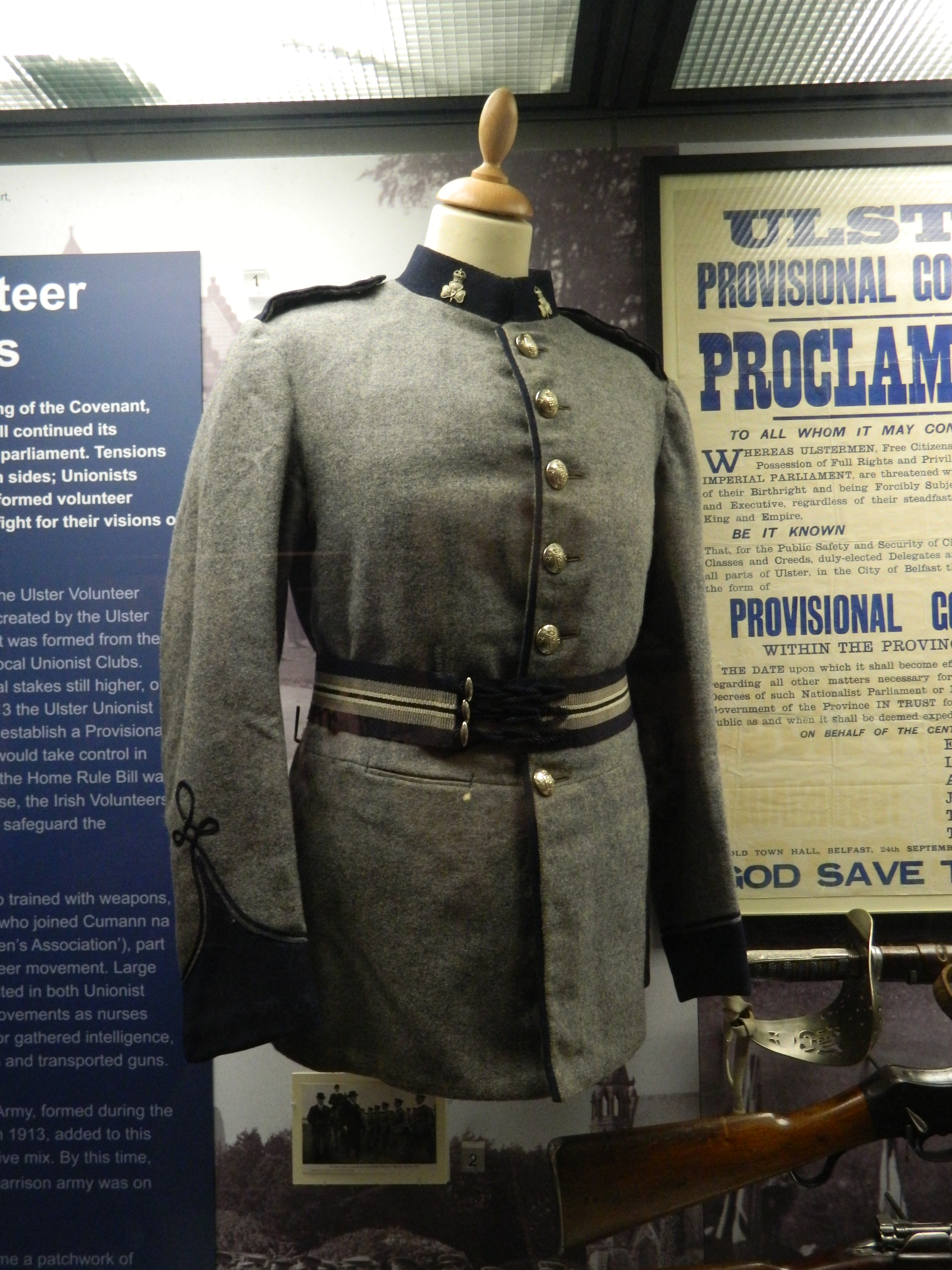
YCV uniform jacket, c. 1912-14

The Young Citizen Volunteers of Ireland, or Young Citizen Volunteers (YCV) for short, was an Irish civic organisation founded in Belfast in 1912. It was established to bridge the gap for 18 to 25 year olds between membership of youth organisations—such as the Boys' Brigade and Boy Scouts—and the period of responsible adulthood. Another impetus for its creation was the failure of the British government to extend the legislation for the Territorial Force—introduced in 1908—to Ireland. It was hoped that the War Office would absorb the YCV into the Territorial Force, however such offers were dismissed. Not until the outbreak of World War I did the YCV—by then a battalion of the UVF—become part of the British Army as the 14th Battalion of the Royal Irish Rifles.

The YCV was launched in Belfast City Hall on 10 September 1912 at a meeting chaired by the Lord Mayor, R. J. McMordie, who became its first president. The ideals of the YCV at its onset was stated as being "non-sectarian" and "non-political", and despite its leadership and membership being largely drawn from unionist families it included prominent Belfast nationalist Francis Joseph Bigger as part of its committee. The creation of the YCV had nothing to do with the Home Rule Crisis or Ulster Day on 28 September 1912, which saw the signing of the anti-Home Rule Ulster Covenant. However, by May 1914 the YCV—despite some controversy—merged with the anti-Home Rule Ulster Volunteer Force.

Despite its name implying that it covered the whole of Ireland it never extended outside of Belfast, however there were plans to set up battalions in places such as counties Londonderry and Fermanagh.

The YCV's name was later resurrected by the YCV youth movement attached to the 1966 Ulster Volunteer Force (also UVF). Although there is no direct continuity between the two groups, they share the same emblem of a shamrock surmounted by a Red Hand of Ulster.

== Establishment ==
The YCV had its origins in the Belfast Citizens Association, a conservative ratepayers group. The YCV had its first meeting just prior to the signing of the Solemn League and Covenant (Ulster), opposing Home Rule, in Belfast City Hall on 10 September 1912. The group was inaugurated by R. J. McMordie in his role as Lord Mayor of Belfast and was led by Frederick Crawford. Other leading figures in the group's foundation included Councillor Frank Workman and foundry owner James Mackie. The group initially struggled to attract a Commanding Officer before eventually appointing Colonel R Spencer Chichester, a strongly right-wing Unionist who favoured purchasing guns for the YCV. Although officially called the YCV of Ireland it had no members beyond Belfast.

Each member was to pay 2s.6d (12.5 p) on joining the YCV and a further 6d (2.5p) each month as well as instalments on a £1.10s fee for purchase of their grey uniform. He was to attend weekly drills to learn "modified military and police drill, single stick, rifle and baton exercises, signalling, knot-tying and other such exercises". If possible, he was also to gain some knowledge of "life-saving and ambulance work".

The constitution of the YCV insisted that members should not take part in any political meeting or demonstration, or wear their YCV uniforms at such events. They were stated as being "non-sectarian and non-political" and their objectives were considered to be:

"..... to develop the spirit of responsible citizenship and municipal patriotism by means of lectures and discussions on civic matters.... to cultivate, by means of modified military and police drill, a manly physique, with habits of self control, self-respect and chivalry....to assist as an organization, when called upon, the civil power in the maintenance of peace".

Membership was open to anyone aged between eighteen and thirty-five who was over five feet in height and could present "credentials of good character". Some Roman Catholics did join the YCV, though it was overwhelmingly Protestant in numbers. Made up mainly of middle class members, the YCV was patterned after the Scout movement, albeit for young men who were too old for that group, as well as the Boys' Brigade and Church Lads' and Church Girls' Brigade. The group was formed in part because the Territorial Force had not been extended to Ireland and members wanted a substitute.

The foundation of the YCV was hailed by the Northern Whig, a Unionist daily paper, although the Irish News, a nationalist paper, was less enthusiastic, speculating that the YCV had been set up as an organised strike-breaking force, with memories of the 1907 Belfast Dock strike still fresh.

== Merger with the Ulster Volunteers ==
The anti-Home Rule Ulster Volunteer Force was created in January 1913 and there is evidence of co-operation between them and the YCV including the Larne gun-running. As the Home Rule crisis escalated, pressure grew for the YCV to become part of the UVF, and such a proposal was made in March 1914. This caused a degree of controversy and division amongst its membership, even with those who were members of both organisations who sought for the YCV to remain non-political. The 1st Battalion YCV went ahead and merged with the UVF, leading to a resolution being proposed and seconded at a YCV council meeting declaring regret that they were not consulted beforehand and that the 1st Battalion had no authority to proceed. Some members of the YCV resigned because of the merger, however the majority didn't and on 17 May 1914 it ceased to be an independent organisation becoming a battalion of the UVF. At the time of the merger the YCV had around 400 Catholic members who drifted from the movement rather than switch to the Protestant UVF.

== Financial problems ==
From soon after its inception the YCV faced financial problems as it tried and failed to solicit donations from major local businesses. By early 1914 the situation had become so dire that Frank Workman, a wealthy industrialist who was a partner in Workman, Clark ship builders, was paying for the upkeep of the group out of his own pocket. Despite Chichester's attempts to fully militarise the group, the British government refused to offer financial assistance to the YCV, in return for placing themselves at the government's disposal.

== First World War ==
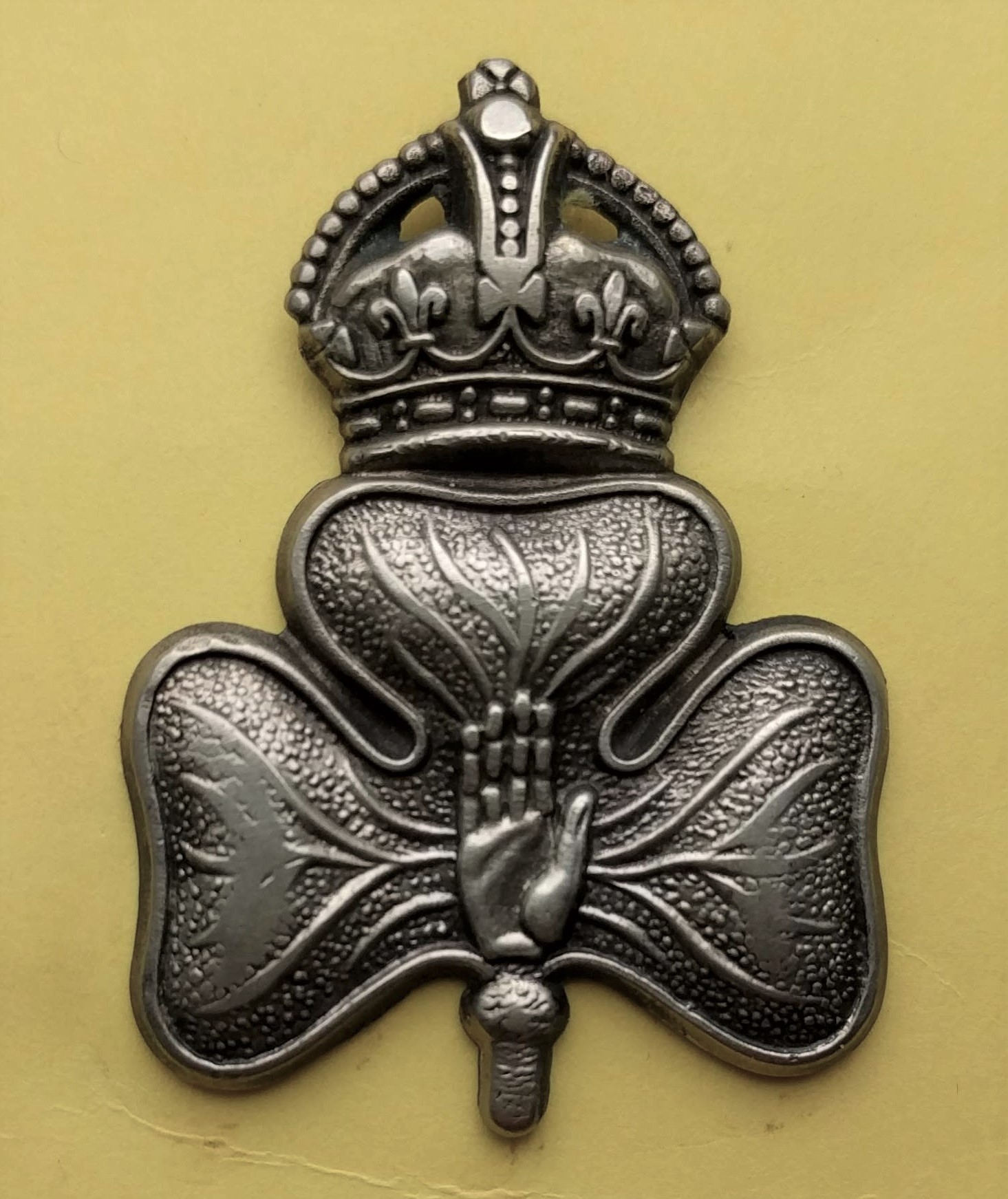
Cap badge, 14th Battalion (YCV) Royal Irish Rifles, 1914

The Ulster Volunteers were most closely associated with the 36th (Ulster) Division during the First World War and the YCV as a unit formed the 14th Battalion of the Royal Irish Rifles, which was part of the 36th. The Battalion was commanded by Lieutenant Colonel Robert Chichester, who addressed the soldiers as "young citizens", and wore the grey uniform of the YCV, although the group's 750 members were augmented by troops from mainland Britain (who made up 25% of the 14th) and the rest of Ireland (17%). A large group of English conscripts in the Battalion were nicknamed the "Gawd Blimey Brigade" by the original Belfast members, many of whom came from middle and upper-class families and looked down on the more rough and ready English soldiers. The more well off origins of the YCV members saw the Battalion itself acquire the nickname "Young Chocolate Soldiers".

The group mutinied twice in 1915, first in June when soldiers drilling at Shane's Castle near Randalstown refused to march back to barracks, insisting that a train be sent to carry them instead. Chichester acceded to this demand. This was followed in September when the group mutinied over the cancellation of leave as part of a wider mutiny within the 36th. The mutiny in the 14th was defused however by a "Major B" who convinced the soldiers to abandon their plans. Soon after this they were attached to the 12th Brigade following a reorganisation of the Ulster forces.

By 1917, the 14th was generally seen as one of the poorer combat units of the Ulster Division. A letter by Major General Oliver Nugent to the Adjutant General in December 1917 described them as "totally wanting in any military spirit" and stated that "the Brigadier says he cannot trust them and I know that he is right [as] they are poor stuff either as workers or fighters and have been a constant source of anxiety during the past three weeks". The group was disbanded in early 1918 as part of a wider reduction in size for the 36th (Ulster) Division.

== Post-war ==
Plans were made in 1919 to revive the YCV under the patronage of James Johnston, the serving Mayor of Belfast. Edward Carson however had little enthusiasm and suggested they contact the British authorities at Dublin Castle for their opinion. When this line of contact was ignored the plan was abandoned and the YCV did not return. The name was revived in 1972 for a separate group with no direct connection to the original.
