= George Richardson (Indian Army officer) =

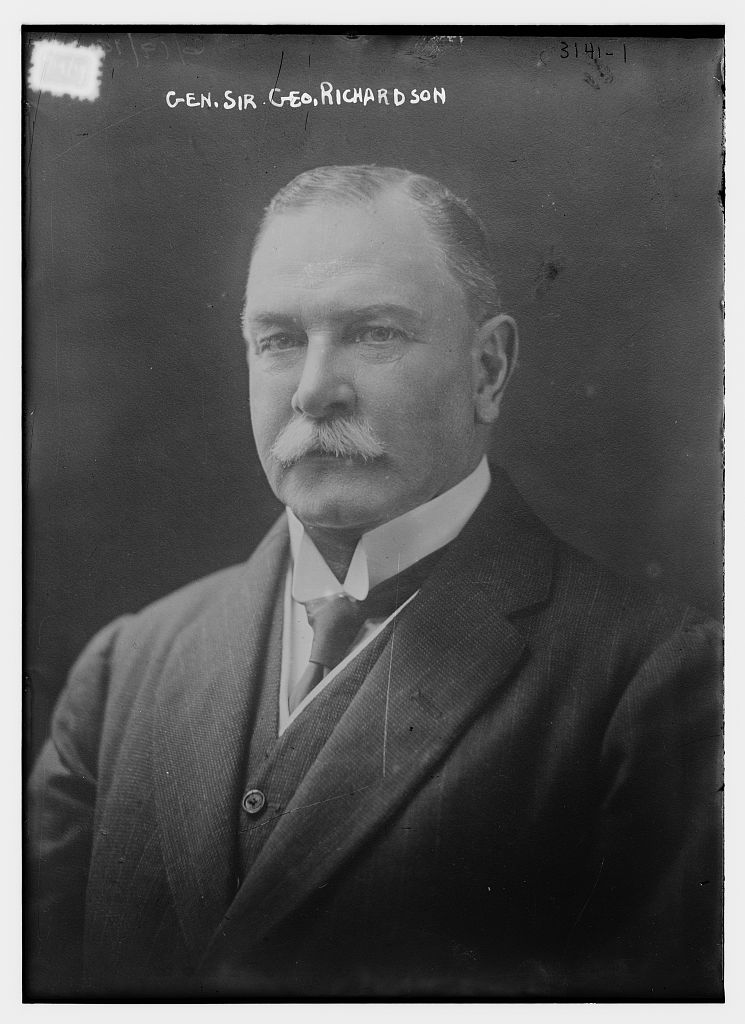
- Born: 20 September 1847; British India
- Died: 9 April 1931 (aged 83); Hartley Wintney, Hampshire, England
- Military career
- Allegiance: United Kingdom
- Branch: British Army; British Indian Army
- Service years: 1866–1914
- Rank: Lieutenant-General
- Unit: Ulster Volunteer Force
- Commands: 18th King George's Own Lancers (1892–1898); Agra Brigade (1903); Poona Division (1904–08); Ulster Volunteer Force (1913)
- Conflicts: Second Boer War; Boxer Rebellion; Larne gun-running
- Awards: Knight Commander of the Order of the Bath; Companion of the Order of the Star of India; Companion of the Order of the Indian Empire

Lieutenant General Sir George Lloyd Reilly Richardson KCB CSI CIE (20 September 1847 – 9 April 1931) was an officer in the British Indian Army from 1866 to 1909. He served across South East Asia, becoming a veteran of the Second Anglo-Afghan War and Boxer Rebellion, and later as commander of the Ulster Volunteer Force in Ireland.

== Biography ==
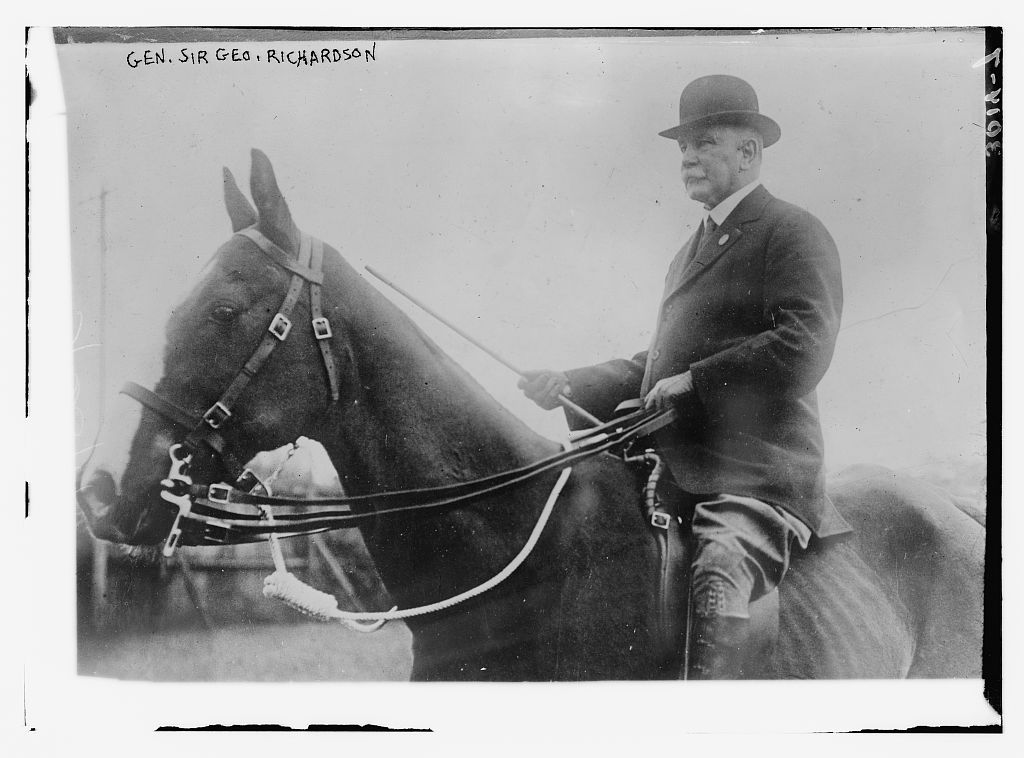
Richardson on horseback

Born in 1847, Richardson was the son of Major General Joseph Fletcher Richardson and his wife, Mary Hannah Reilly.

He joined the 38th (1st Staffordshire) Regiment of Foot as a second-lieutenant on 23 March 1866 and took part in the Hazara expedition in 1868. He was promoted to lieutenant on 5 March 1869 and transferred to the British Indian Army, where he was attached to the 18th King George's Own Lancers in 1871. Promoted to captain on 30 January 1878, he fought in the Second Anglo-Afghan War between 1879 and 1880 and took part in the Waziri expedition in 1881. He was promoted to major on 2 March 1881. He joined in the Zhob Valley Field Force in 1890 and following promotion to lieutenant-colonel on 23 March 1892, he served as commanding officer of the 18th King George's Own Lancers between 1892 and 1898. He was promoted to colonel on 23 March 1896, served with the Flying Column in Kurram Valley between 1897 and 1898 and then took part in the Tirah expedition. In early 1900 he acted as Colonel on the Staff at Rawalpindi, a position he was officially appointed to on 21 February 1900. From April to July 1900 he acted as Colonel on the Staff at Delhi, then fought with the Cavalry Brigade in China between 1900 and 1901, where he led the final assault on Peking during the Boxer Rebellion. In late 1902 he commanded a brigade at Shanghai, with the temporary rank of major-general. He became commander of the Hyderabad Contingent in 1902 and of the Agra Brigade in 1903 and then became General Officer Commanding Poona Division in 1904. He retired from the Indian Army in 1909.

He was appointed Colonel of the 18th King George's Own Lancers from 1 January 1906 until 1921, then the 19th King George's Own Lancers from 1921 until his death.

Richardson's military career however did not end with retirement from the Indian army. In 1913 he agreed to command the then newly formed Ulster Volunteer Force, created to fight Irish Home rule, and oversaw the Larne gun-running. Richardson died in 1931.

== Honours ==
- CIE: Companion of the Order of the Indian Empire - 1893
- CSI: Companion of the Order of the Star of India - 24 July 1901 - in recognition of services during the campaign in China (Boxer Rebellion)
- KCB: Knight Commander of the Order of the Bath - 1909 (Companion (CB) 1898)

== See also ==
- Ulster Volunteers
