= F. E. Crichton =

- Born: Frances Elizabeth Sinclair; 1877; Hopefield House, Belfast, Ireland
- Died: 23 November 1918 (aged 40–41); England

F. E. Crichton or Frances Elizabeth "Effie" Crichton (1877 – 23 November 1918) was an Irish writer.

== Life ==
F. E. Crichton was born Frances Elizabeth Sinclair in 1877. Her parents were Thomas Sinclair, businessman and politician, and his first wife Mary (née Duffin). She was also known as "Effie". She was the eldest child of four sons and three daughters. Crichton's maternal great-uncle was John Grubb Richardson. She was privately educated at Richmond, and travelled Europe including Germany, Italy, and Switzerland. After her marriage to William Sinclair Crichton on 9 April 1906, Crichton moved to Liverpool where she took up writing.

Crichton's work reflected Ulster speech, as well as the character of life there. She wrote short stories, novels and books for children. Her work, especially her first book, has been likened to that of Maria Edgeworth.

Crichton died on 23 November 1918 in England. She was a second cousin of British writer, May Sinclair.

== Works ==
- The precepts of Andy Saul (1908)
- Peep-In-The World (1908)
- The Little Wizard of White Cloud Hill (1910)
- The soundless tide (1911)
- Tinker's Hollow (1912)
- The Blind Side of the Heart (1915)
