= Young Citizen Volunteers =

The Young Citizen Volunteers refers to either:

- Young Citizen Volunteers (1912)
- Young Citizen Volunteers (1972)
