= Larne gun-running =

Gun smuggling operation in 1914 Ireland

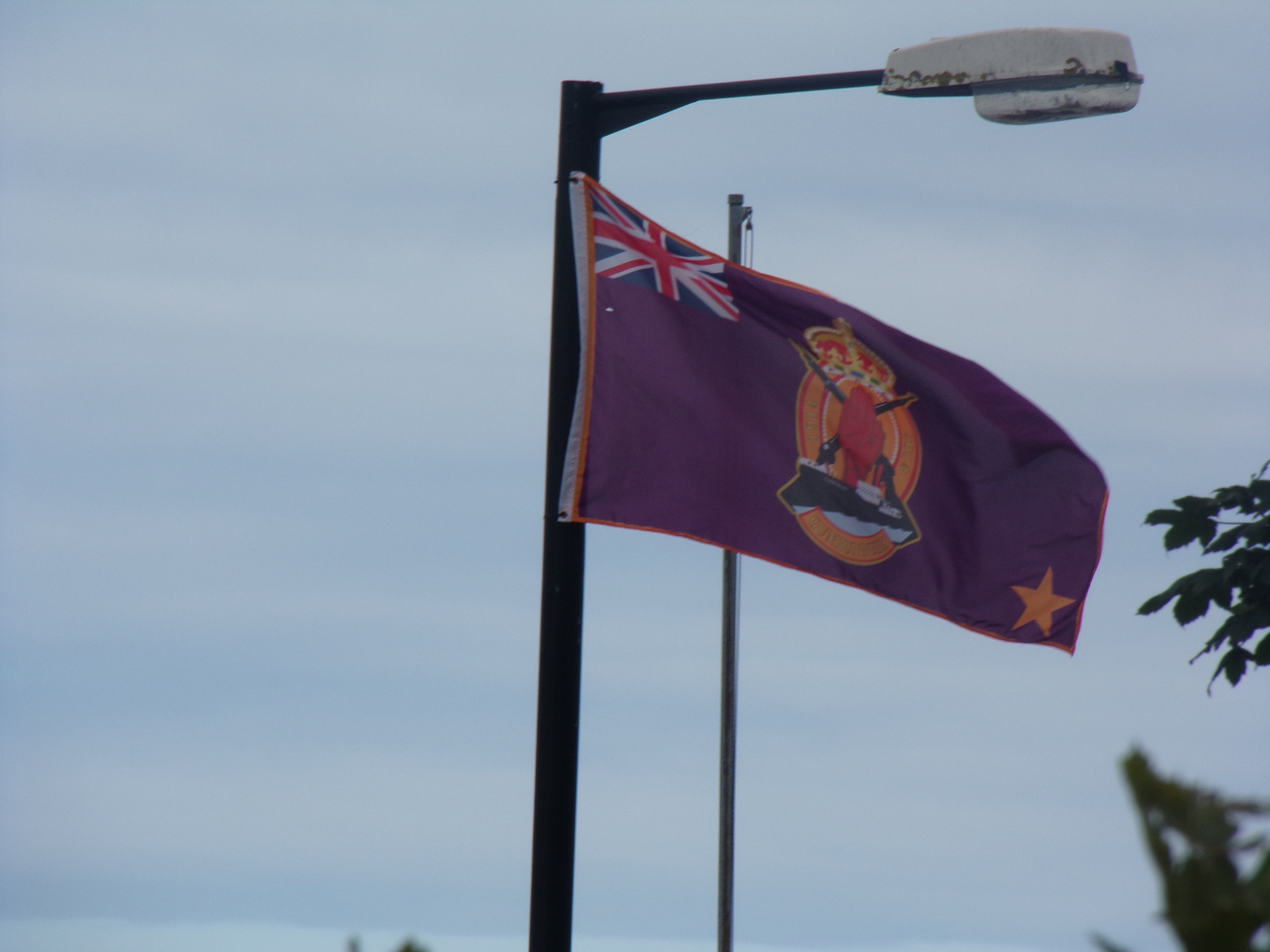
A 100th anniversary flag commemorating the gun running flying in Glenarm.

The Larne gun-running was a major gun smuggling operation organised in April 1914 in Ireland by Major Frederick H. Crawford and Captain Wilfrid Spender for the Ulster Unionist Council to equip the Ulster Volunteer Force. The operation involved the smuggling of almost 25,000 rifles and between 3 and 5 million rounds of ammunition from the German Empire, with the shipments landing in Larne, Donaghadee, and Bangor in the early hours between Friday 24 and Saturday 25 April 1914. The Larne gun-running may have been the first time in history that motor vehicles were used "on a large scale for a military purpose, and with striking success".

== Background ==
In November 1910 the Ulster Unionist Council formed a secret committee to oversee the creation of a force in Ulster to fight against the imposition of Home Rule, which was proposed to give Ireland self-government within the United Kingdom of Great Britain and Ireland. The Council approached Major Frederick H. Crawford to act as its agent to purchase the guns needed to equip such an organisation. Crawford wrote to five arms manufacturers, including the Austrian Steyr and the German Deutsche Waffen- und Munitionsfabriken, seeking quotations for the purchase of 20,000 rifles and one million rounds of ammunition.

In January 1913, the Ulster Unionist Council instituted the Ulster Volunteer Force (UVF), consisting of men who had signed the Ulster Covenant. They wanted to co-ordinate the paramilitary activities of Ulster’s unionists, as well as to give military backing to the threats of the Ulster Covenant to resist implementation of the Third Home Rule Bill, which had been introduced on 11 April 1912 by Prime Minister H. H. Asquith. These threats had been regarded as a "gigantic game of bluff and blackmail" by Irish nationalist leader John Redmond. The British government took the threat of armed rebellion seriously: on 18 March 1914 orders were sent to Ireland to move troops and ships into position to guard arms depots and prevent the theft of weapons in Ulster. The Admiralty ordered that Carrickfergus Castle (a major military depot) be defended against attack with the use of Navy vessels as needed. When British Officers were notified of their transfer to duty in Ulster some decided to resign their commissions. Their actions were referred to as the Curragh incident or Curragh mutiny. On 30 March 1914 Winston Churchill made his feelings clear on the possibility of an armed rebellion in Ulster: "We have been confronted with an avowed conspiracy to defy Parliament and the law, leaving a great army practising preparations for rebellion and for the setting up of a provisional Government, which would be an outrage against the realm and the Empire."

UVF membership grew to around 90,000 members, led by retired officers of the British Army, with the organisation under the charge of Lieutenant-General Sir George Richardson KCB, a veteran of the Afghan Wars. By 1913 the UVF had over £1 million pledged to it, and £70,000 invested in attempts to import arms. Throughout 1913 Major Crawford, with the use of aliases and disguises, had attempted to smuggle in arms bought in Great Britain and Imperial Germany, but vigilant customs officials had seized the goods at the docks. In one instance, patrol boats thwarted a gun-running attempt to Carrigart in northern County Donegal carried out by Lord Leitrim. Lord Leitrim had been carrying out a weekly small-scale gun-smuggling operation since February 1913, run by his chauffeur.

In early June 1913, around seven thousand rifles being stored by Crawford in a disused inn in Hammersmith were seized by police. The inn was being rented out to Crawford by a brother-in-law of staunch Unionist Sir William Bull, 1st Baronet. One week later, with the intention of forcing the government to accept that there was a real risk of armed resistance to Home Rule in Ulster. Crawford openly transported weapons to Belfast from several locations across England. These were intercepted by customs officials.

Major Crawford convinced the Ulster Unionist Council that he could provide the weapons and ammunition needed "to equip the entire UVF". Money was made available to purchase the weapons and two ships to transport them. Funding apparently came from both British and Belfast Tory organizations; most senior Conservative leaders in London were aware of the plan. In early February 1914, Crawford met with Edward Carson (the leader of the Ulster Unionist Party 1910–1921) in his home in London; Carson said "I'll see you through this business even if I should go to prison for it. You are the bravest man I have ever met."

== Preparations and transport ==
Major Crawford and arms dealer Benny Spiro, March 1914. The man on the far right of the back row is Richard Toomath, of John Milligan & Co. Coal Merchants. The firm was Crawford's link to the Clydesdale Steamship Company.

Crawford secured the services of the SS Fanny to transport 216 tons of guns and ammunition which he had purchased from Benny Spiro, an arms dealer in Hamburg. Included in this cache was: 11,000 Mannlicher rifles brought from the Steyr works in Austria; 9,000 Gewehr 1888s; 4,600 Italian Vetterli-Vitali rifles; and 5 million rounds of ammunition in clips of five – much of which was transported from Hamburg via the Kiel Canal.

On 30 March 1914, these weapons were being loaded onto the steamship Fanny on the Baltic island of Langeland when Danish customs officials seized the papers of the ship. The customs officials suspected that the cargo might contain weapons to arm militant Icelandic home rulers who sought independence from Denmark. The SS Fanny managed to escape into a gale and sailed outside Danish territorial waters. In covering the incident on 1 April, The Times newspaper predicted that the guns were destined for Ulster rather than Iceland.

In a bid to evade the authorities as the Fanny neared Ireland, Major Crawford purchased the SS Clyde Valley in Glasgow. On 19–20 April off Tuskar Rock, County Wexford, the entire cache of weapons was transferred from the Fanny to the Clyde Valley. On 24 April, the Clyde Valley was renamed the Mountjoy II, with the use of 6-foot-long (1.8 m) strips of canvas painted with white letters on a black background. This referred to the Mountjoy that broke the boom across the River Foyle during the Siege of Derry in 1689, providing historic symbolism for unionists.

In Ulster, the UVF were given instructions for a full test-mobilisation. The UVF Motor Corps was summoned by the County Antrim commander, General Sir William Adair, and instructed as follows:

It is absolutely necessary that your cars should arrive at Larne in the night of Friday-Saturday 24th–25th instant at 1 a.m. punctually but not before that hour for a very secret and important duty...

This was all part of a "meticulous" and "elaborate" plan to ensure that the operation succeeded; only 12 people knew the full details and reason for the mobilisation of the UVF members. This was officially only a "test mobilisation". Captain F. Hall, the military secretary to the UVF, recorded details of these plans in a memorandum. These included tapping the private telephone line connecting Hollywood Barracks to Exchange, short-circuiting phone and telegraph wires into Larne after the last train, and "shorting" the main rail lines to force the signal system to halt train movements.

On the date of the landings, UVF members manned pickets and patrols along the length of the coast road between Belfast and Larne, as well as the roads leading to the towns of Ballyclare, Ballymena, and Glenarm amongst others. The men at these pickets were to give directions to any who needed them and were provided with reserve supplies of petrol and tools for repairing any vehicle that had problems. In Larne, UVF members wearing armlets stood "in line silent as soldiers on parade", and manned cordons that blocked the roads, preventing vehicles without a special permit from entering or departing Larne.

Captain James Craig took command of the operations in Bangor, with Adair taking command in Larne. Sir George Richardson, overall commander of the UVF, remained in Belfast on the night of the landings and was kept fully informed of proceedings by dispatch-riders.

== Hoax and real landings ==
On the date for the UVF Motor Corps "test" operation, the tramp steamer SS Balmerino was dispatched into Belfast Lough as a decoy to attract attention from authorities, to investigate it for smuggled armaments, in what the UVF leadership called the Hoax.

In addition, the UVF arranged for a large truck to be waiting at the Belfast docks as if for an incoming load. The captain of the Balmerino ensured that by making his ship's approach as suspicious as possible, the authorities would be alerted. Once the ship was docked, the captain set about stalling the authorities for as long as possible with excuses, and the authorities believed that they had intercepted the real cargo. Eventually the authorities searched the ship's contents, discovering its papers were in order and it was carrying only coal as described.

While this was happening, twenty miles away the "Mountjoy II" brought the real arms cache into Larne harbour unhindered. After the "Mountjoy II" docked, a motor-boat came alongside and cranes transferred thousands of rifles to it. After it had motored away, a second vessel came up to receive more arms. These vessels transported their loads to Donaghadee.

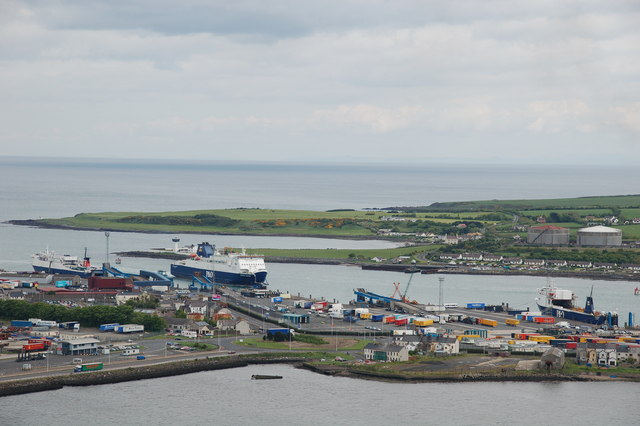
Larne harbour, present day

There the weapons were transferred to the motor vehicles; each batch was counted and its destination noted by counting clerks. Due to the volume of weapons, temporary arms-dumps had been set up in the surrounding districts so that the vehicles could return as quickly as possible to receive another load. The Belfast Evening Telegraph remarked that all present "put their backs into it" and that it "illustrated the old adage, 'One Volunteer is worth three pressed men'" and they "toiled like galley slaves". The local population of Larne were noted as having lined the streets exchanging salutes and running makeshift canteens to supply the workers with refreshments throughout the night.

At 5 am the "Mountjoy II" set sail from Larne harbour for Bangor to unload the rest of its cargo. Three cheers for "The King" and three more for "the Volunteers" were let out by the ship's skipper and its crew as they stood to attention, with the cheers reportedly reciprocated by all those ashore.

By 8:30 am the "Mountjoy II" had completed its mission, and it set course for the River Clyde to confuse any coast-guards. On its way, crew cut away the canvas sheets bearing the name Mountjoy II, revealing the ship's real name, Clyde Valley, and it proceeded south along the Irish Sea. After offloading Major Crawford at Rosslare, County Wexford, the Clyde Valley set sail for the Baltic Sea, travelling along the coasts of France and Denmark. It rendezvoused with the Fanny to bring back the Ulstermen contingent of its crew. After that was done, the Fanny was disposed of at Hamburg.

== Aftermath and consequences ==
One of the key figures in the operation was Captain Wilfrid Spender, a member of the UVF headquarters staff who is alleged to have been responsible for the entire scheme and helped in the Hoax masquerade. His wife recorded details of the landing in her diary for the dates 24–25 April:

The whole proceedings are almost incredible, and nothing but the most perfect organisation, combined with the most perfect and loyal co-operation on the part of all concerned, could have carried it through without a single case of bloodshed ...

The Belfast Evening Telegraph reported on the events on 25 April:

There was no rush or bustle in the doing of it. It was accomplished with celerity, yet without fuss or splutter, because it was done in pursuance of a well-formed plan, executed as perfectly as it had been preconceived ... So exactly had this mobilisation been arranged that these hundreds of motors reached the assembly point at an identical moment. It was an amazing sight to see this huge procession of cars nearly three miles in length descending upon the town with all their headlights ablaze.

For the Unionist leaders, the Larne gun-running was even more of a political coup than a military feat. The Ulster Volunteers remained inadequately armed, as the weapons shipment contained three types of weapon and insufficient proper ammunition for them. The Larne delivery markedly increased the amount of arms for the UVF. Many much smaller weapons purchases had resulted in the UVF as having just over 37,000 rifles by June 1914.

The Larne gun-running put the gun back into Irish politics. The Irish Volunteers had been working on their own plan to acquire weapons, and the success at Larne heightened nationalist suspicions that the authorities were acquiescent towards unionist militants in Ulster. After the events in Larne, the nationalist Irish Volunteers, formed in late 1913, attracted many new members.

At the outbreak of the First World War, the government requested all arms and ammunition of the UVF for the war effort. By 1916 the ammunition had largely been transferred, but none of the rifles. In 1920 after the outbreak of the Irish war of Independence, the rifles were used to arm the new Ulster Special Constabulary that was formed (by the same Wilfrid Spender). The USC was largely recruited from former Ulster Volunteers. In 1940 the rifles were released to arm the British Home Guard after the Battle of France. They were first fired in action during the East African Campaign of 1940–41, arming the militias of Haile Selassie I.

The Irish Volunteers arranged their own gun-running operation in July 1914, transporting the guns on a private yacht and unloading in daylight at the harbour, in front of a crowd. The Dublin Metropolitan Police (DMP), aided by troops of the 2nd King's Own Scottish Borderers, tried unsuccessfully to confiscate the weapons. On their return to their barracks in Dublin, some troops, baited by a hostile crowd, killed three people and wounded 38. A fourth man died later. Some nationalists interpreted the contrast between the inactivity of the police and military in Larne (which operation took place in the middle of the night) and the heavy-handed response in the middle of the day in Dublin that authorities were biased in favour of the UVF. The whole episode heightened tensions in Ireland, pulling it closer to the brink of civil war.

== Representation in media ==
- The events of the Larne gun-running and the voyages of the SS Fanny and SS Clyde Valley are remembered in the loyalist songs, "Gunrunners" and "Gallant Clyde Valley".

== See also ==
- Ulster Unionist Council
- Ulster Volunteers
- Ulster Solemn League and Covenant
- Home rule
- Irish Volunteers
- Howth gun-running
- Irish issue in British politics
