= Frederick H. Crawford =

British Army officer (1861–1952)

- Born: Frederick Hugh Crawford; 21 August 1861; Belfast, Ireland
- Died: 5 November 1952 (aged 91)
- Occupations: Soldier, arms smuggler
- Title: Colonel
- Spouse: Helen Crawford
- Children: Stuart Wright Knox, Helen Nannie, Majorie Doreen, Ethel Bethea, Malcolm Adair Alexander

Colonel Frederick Hugh Crawford, CBE, JP (21 August 1861 – 5 November 1952) was an officer in the British Army. A staunch Ulster loyalist, Crawford is most notable for organising the Larne gun-running which secured guns and ammunition for the Ulster Volunteers (UVF) in 1914, which made him a hero for Northern Ireland's unionists.

== Background ==
Crawford was born in Belfast on 21 August 1861 into a "solid Methodist" family of Ulster-Scots roots. He attended Methodist College Belfast and University College, London. Whilst Crawford was a determined Ulster loyalist, his great-grandfather was Alexander Crawford, a United Irishman arrested in March 1797 for "high treason", and sent to Kilmainham Gaol, sharing a cell with prominent United Irishman Henry Joy McCracken.

According to the 1911 census for Ireland, Crawford was living in Marlborough Park, Belfast, with his wife of 15 years Helen, and four of their five children: Helen Nannie; Marjorie Doreen; Ethel Bethea; and Malcolm Adair Alexander. His other child, Stuart Wright Knox, is recorded as a pupil at Ballycloghan National School, Belfast. Stuart would become a lieutenant-colonel in the British Army, before being invalided in 1944. Malcolm, after being a member of the Colonial Police, joined the Royal Ulster Constabulary, advancing to District Inspector. In 1931, Malcolm became a Justice of the Peace for Singapore.

== Career ==
Crawford worked as an engineer for White Star Line in the 1880s, before returning from Australia in 1892. In 1894 he enlisted with the Mid Ulster Artillery regiment of the British Army, before being transferred to the Donegal Artillery, with which he served during the Boer Wars, earning himself the rank of major.

In 1898, Crawford was appointed governor of Campbell College, Belfast. Two of his children, Stuart Wright Knox and Malcolm Adair Alexander, both attended Campbell College.

In 1911 he became a member of the Ulster Unionist Council. On 28 September 1912 he was in charge of the 2,500 well-dressed stewards and marshals that escorted Sir Edward Carson and the Ulster Unionist leadership from the Ulster Hall in central Belfast to the nearby City Hall on Donegall Square for the signing of the Ulster Covenant, which he is alleged to have signed in his own blood. With the formation of the Ulster Volunteer Force (UVF) in 1913, he was made their Director of Ordnance.

During the First World War he was an officer commanding the Royal Army Service Corps, and was awarded the Royal Humane Society's bronze medal for saving life. He also became a justice of the peace for Belfast.

== Politics and paramilitarism ==
With regard to Irish Home Rule, Crawford was strongly partisan and backed armed resistance to it, being contemptuous of those who used political bluffing. His advocation of armed resistance was evident when he remarked, at a meeting of the Ulster Unionist Council, that his heart "rejoiced" when he heard talk of looking into using physical force. At another meeting he even went as far as asking some attendees to step into another room where he had fixed bayonets, rifles and cartridges laid out.

In 1910 the Ulster Unionist Council planned for the creation of an army to oppose Home Rule and approached Crawford to act as their agent in securing weapons and ammunition. Crawford tried several times to smuggle arms into Ulster; however, vigilant customs officials seized many of them at the docks. Despite this, the meticulously planned and audacious Larne gun-running of April 1914, devised and carried out by Crawford, was successful in bringing in enough arms to equip the Ulster Volunteer Force.

By the 1920s Crawford remained as stoic in his beliefs, remarking in a letter in 1920 that "I am ashamed to call myself an Irishman. Thank God I am not one. I am an Ulsterman, a very different breed". In March 1920 Crawford began to reorganize the UVF and in May 1920 he appealed to Carson and Craig for official government recognition. He stated: "We in Ulster will not be able to hold our men in hand much longer...we will have the Protestants...killing a lot of the well known Sinn Fein leaders and hanging half a dozen priests." In 1921 he attempted to create an organisation intended to be a "Detective Reserve", but called the "Ulster Brotherhood", the aims of which were to uphold the Protestant religion and political and religious freedom, as well as use all means to "destroy and wipe out the Sinn Féin conspiracy of murder, assassination and outrage". This organisation only lasted for a few months after failing to gain acceptance from the political authorities.

== Later years ==
In 1921 Crawford was included in the Royal Honours List and appointed a CBE. In 1934 Crawford wrote his memoirs, titled Guns for Ulster. He died 5 November 1952, and was buried in the City Cemetery, Falls Road, Belfast. Upon news of his death he was described by the then Prime Minister of Northern Ireland, Sir Basil Brooke, as being "as a fearless fighter in the historic fight to keep Ulster British".

== See also ==
- Arms smuggling
- Ulster Volunteers
- Ulster Unionist Council
- Irish Home Rule Movement
