= Wilfrid Spender =

British army officer (1876–1960)

Sir Wilfrid Bliss Spender KCB CBE DSO MC (6 October 1876 – 21 December 1960) was a British Army officer, colonial administrator and civil servant. Spender commanded the organisation the Ulster Volunteers (UVF). He helped re-organise the UVF into the Ulster Special Constabulary and was responsible for laying the foundations for the civil service of Northern Ireland. He served as First Secretary to the government of Northern Ireland from 1921 to 1925 and Permanent Secretary to the Ministry of Finance from 1925 to 1944. He was knighted in 1929. His wife, Lady Spender (née Alice Lilian Dean; 1880-1966), was a member of the UVF Nursing Corps and worked in the Ulster Division Comforts Fund during World War I. Later in life Spender became a noted diarist.

== Family life ==
Wilfrid Bliss Spender was born in Plymouth, England, the third son of Edward and Ellen (née Rendle) Spender. His father was co-founder of the Western Morning News in Plymouth. When Wilfrid was one year old, his father and two elder brothers were drowned whilst boating at Whitsand Bay outside Plymouth.

== Education/service ==
He was educated at Winchester College and the Staff College, Camberley. He obtained a commission first in the Devon artillery. In 1897 he joined the Royal Artillery, seeing service in Bermuda, Canada, Malta, England, Ireland, and India. He was promoted to lieutenant 18 June 1900, and to captain on 13 February 1902. After Camberley he was nominated to attend a naval war course, one of the first two army staff officers to be so chosen. In 1909 became a member of the home defence section of the Imperial Defence Committee, which was then involved with the general defence of the United Kingdom. He was at one point the youngest staff officer in the British army.

He organized, and partly financed, a national petition against proposed Home Rule in Ireland, and helped establish the Junior Imperial League. He accepted an invitation to stand for Parliament, but withdrew when the rules were changed to place officers on half pay if they entered parliament. He signed the Ulster Covenant when it was opened for signature in England. In 1913 he was allowed to retire from his army commission, refusing to resign with the rank of Captain and pension of £120 per year. A confidential inspection report of 1913 commented that Captain Spender had been led away by a 'too active conscience' and had been very injudicious, risking his prospects in life. While disputing being forced to leave the army, feeling his services were required in Ulster, Spender sought legal advice from Sir Edward Carson. He invited Spender to Belfast to help organise the Ulster Volunteer Force, a paramilitary group to resist Home Rule.

During a period of leave from service in India, Spender met an old friend, Alice Lilian Dean. They were married within a few weeks. After a ten-day honeymoon, he and his wife travelled to Belfast, where Spender became Quartermaster General of the UVF, based at the Old Town Hall in Belfast, while remaining a director of his newspaper in Plymouth. In December 1913, amid widespread suspicions that sympathy for the Unionist cause might make army officers reluctant to move against the Ulster Volunteers, the CIGS Sir John French recommended that Spender be cashiered (stripped of his commission - a social disgrace that disqualified the person from any further Crown employment) "pour décourager les autres", but this did not happen.

== The Great War ==
In July 1914 Spender, as a retired officer, was told to hold himself ready to take up an appointment with the eastern command in Chatham. He returned to England. After the outbreak of war, he was transferred as general staff officer to the new 36th (Ulster) Division. He served with the Ulster division until 1916, and was present at the Battle of the Somme, when he won the Military Cross for his part in the assault on Thiepval. He also won the DSO and was mentioned in despatches four times. In 1916 he was promoted to Lieutenant-Colonel, and served with General Lord Cavan's corps, and then at advanced general headquarters working under Field Marshal Sir Douglas Haig (later created Lord Haig).

Spender strongly opposed accepting a proposed six-county option for the partition of Ireland, and on these grounds, he declined an invitation from Carson to contest an Ulster constituency at Westminster. About the same time, he gave some support to moves to launch a national party in England — "to promote Reform, the Union and Defence" — and considered seeking nomination for parliament in a constituency in Devon or Cornwall. Following the war, he joined the Ministry of Pensions in London.

== Partition of Ireland ==
In 1920 he was approached by Carson and Craig and asked to return to Belfast to help reorganize the UVF. They formed the Ulster Special Constabulary.

With the partition of Ireland in 1921 Spender was appointed as Cabinet Secretary in Northern Ireland and, in 1925, as permanent secretary at the Ministry of Finance. He opposed any discrimination on religious grounds in the civil service, but was unable to prevent Unionist members of the Northern Ireland parliament dominating the selection boards for other ranks. He was never a member of the Orange Order, despite claims to the contrary from certain quarters.

== Later life ==
Sir Wilfrid retired in 1944 and returned to England in 1955, he died of heart failure on 21 December 1960 at the East Hill Hotel, his home at Liss, Hampshire. He was survived by Lady Spender (died 1966), whom he married in 1913. They had one child, a daughter, Patricia, Mrs. Dingwall.

== Quote ==
- "I am not an Ulsterman but yesterday, the 1st. July, as I followed their amazing attack, I felt that I would rather be an Ulsterman than anything else in the world." (Cpt Wilfred Spender, 2 July 1916)

== Sources ==
- Holmes, Richard (2004). The Little Field Marshal: A Life of Sir John French. Weidenfeld & Nicolson. ISBN 0-297-84614-0.
- Kennedy, Dennis. "Spender, Sir Wilfrid Bliss". Oxford Dictionary of National Biography (online ed.). Oxford University Press. doi:10.1093/ref:odnb/64476. (Subscription, Wikipedia Library access or UK public library membership required.)
- London Gazette notice of Spender's KCB (1929)
