= Ulster Covenant =

1912 petition opposing Irish Home Rule

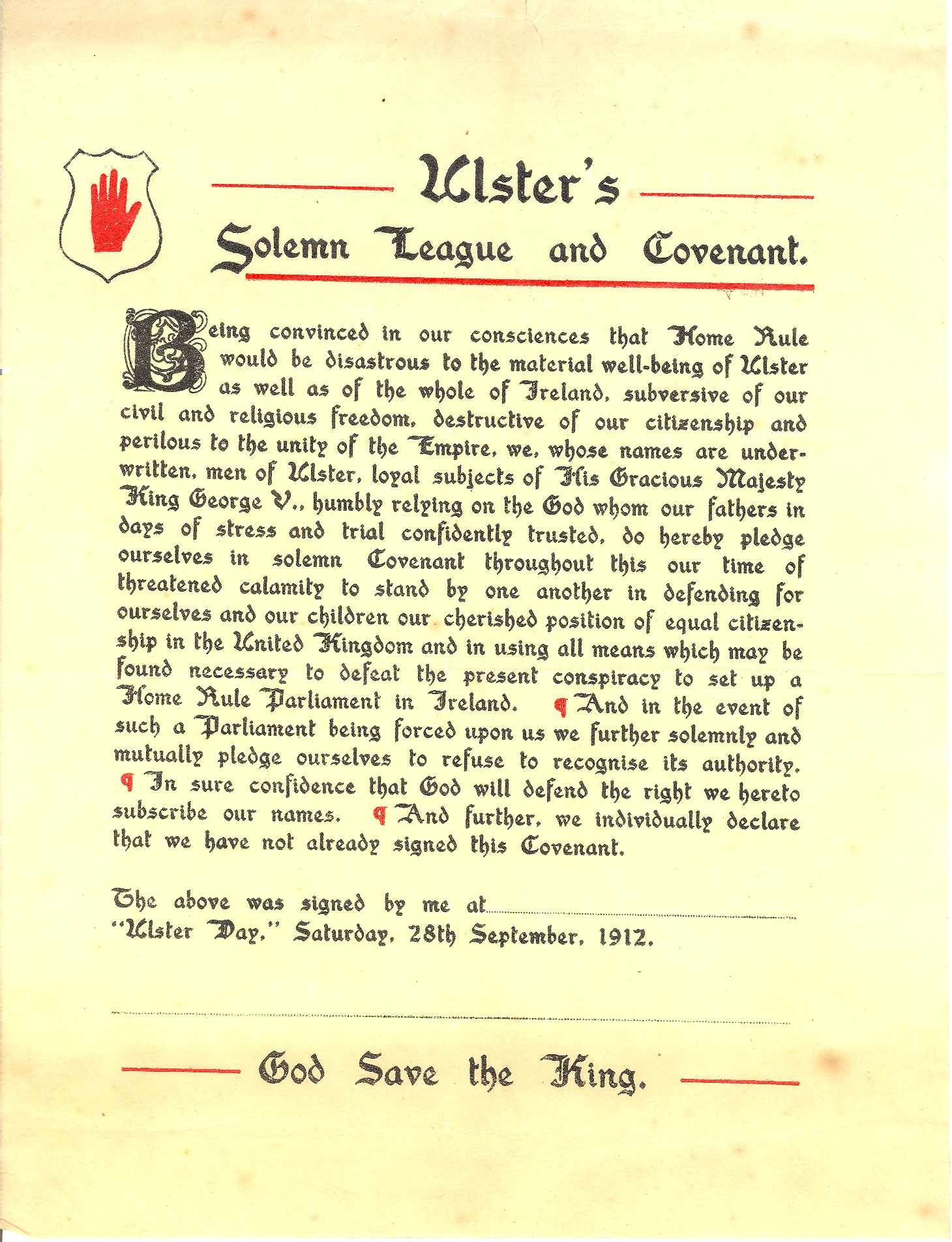
Ulster Covenant

Ulster's Solemn League and Covenant, commonly known as the Ulster Covenant, was signed by nearly 500,000 people on and before 28 September 1912, in protest against the Third Home Rule Bill for Ireland introduced by the British Government in the same year.

== Signing ==
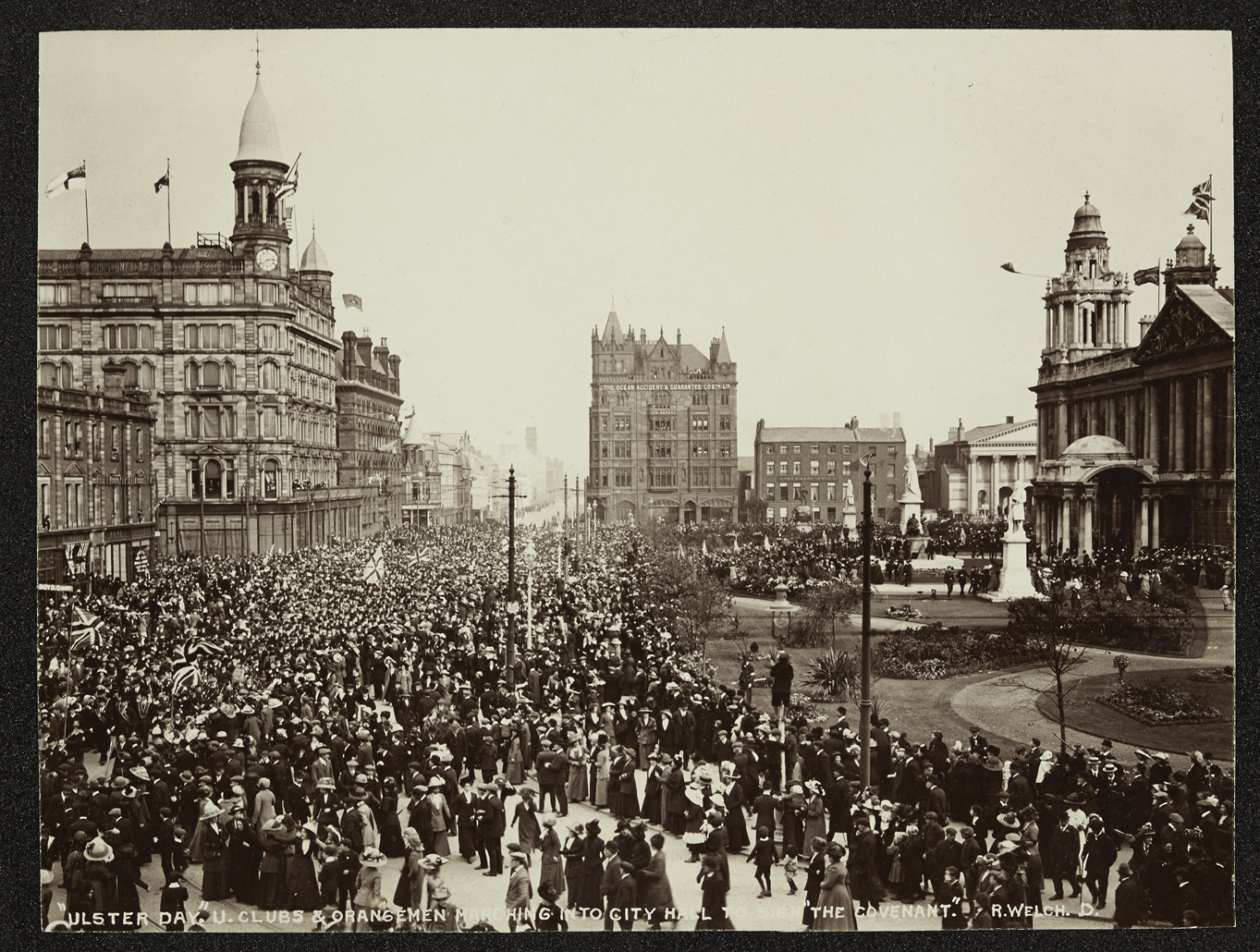
Photograph entitled Ulster Day, Unionist Clubs & Orangemen marching into City Hall to sign the Covenant, Belfast, 1912

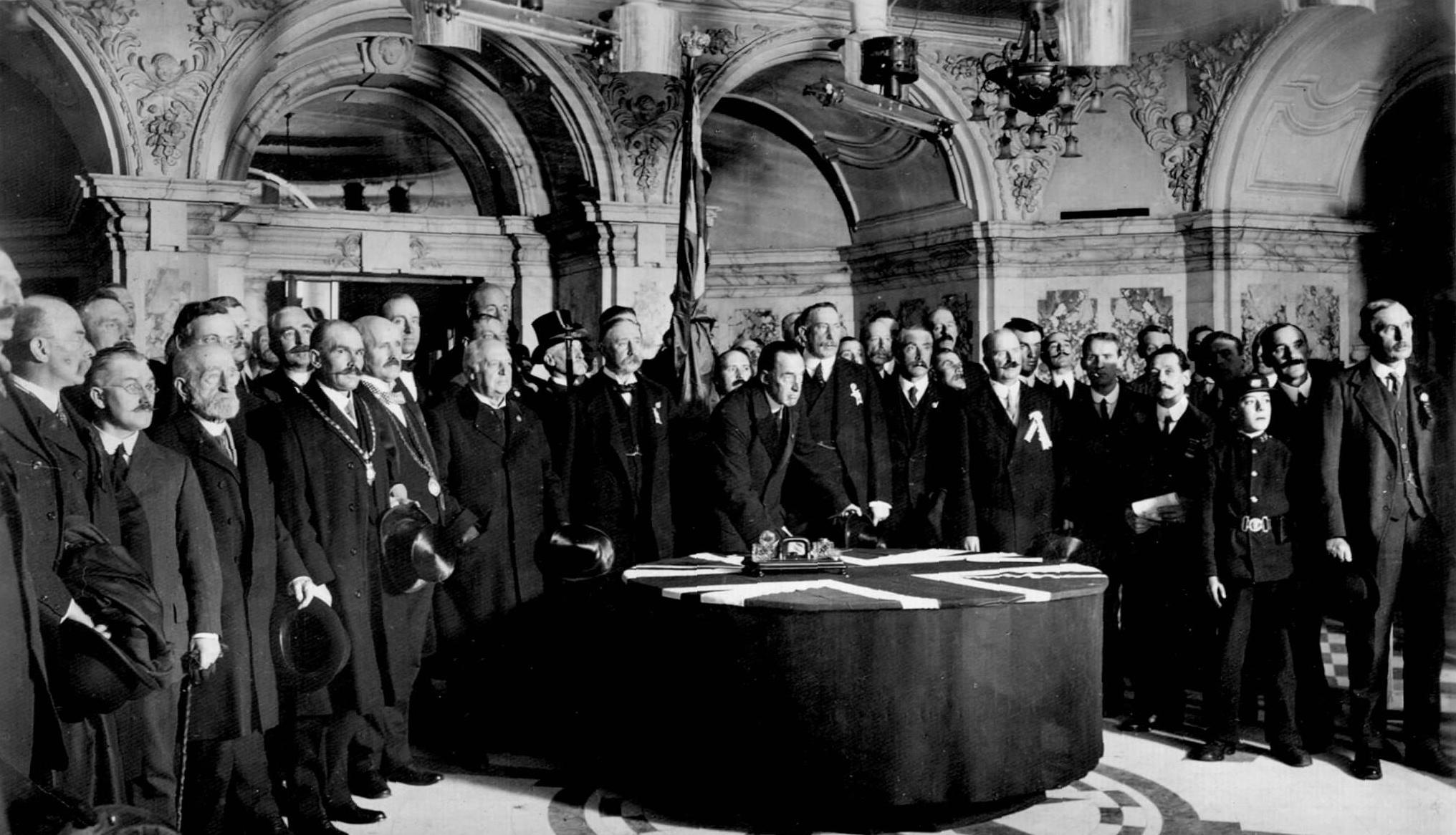
Sir Edward Carson signing the Solemn League and Covenant

The Covenant was first drafted by Thomas Sinclair, a prominent unionist and businessman from Belfast. Sir Edward Carson was the first person to sign the Covenant at Belfast City Hall with a silver pen, followed by The 6th Marquess of Londonderry (the former Lord Lieutenant of Ireland), representatives of the Protestant churches, and then by Sir James Craig. The signatories, 471,414 in all, were all against the establishment of a Home Rule parliament in Dublin. The Ulster Covenant is immortalised in Rudyard Kipling's poem "Ulster 1912". On 23 September 1912, the Ulster Unionist Council voted in favour of a resolution pledging itself to the Covenant.

The Covenant had two basic parts: the Covenant signed by 237,368 men and the Declaration signed by 234,046 women. Both the Covenant and Declaration are held by the Public Record Office of Northern Ireland (PRONI). An online searchable database is available on the PRONI website.

In January 1913, the Ulster Volunteers aimed to recruit 100,000 men aged from 17 to 65 who had signed the Covenant as a unionist militia.

A British Covenant, similar to the Ulster Covenant in opposition to the Home Rule Bill, received two million signatures in 1914.

28 September is today known as "Ulster Day" to unionists.

== The Covenant (for men) ==
BEING CONVINCED in our consciences that Home Rule would be disastrous to the material well-being of Ulster as well as of the whole of Ireland, subversive of our civil and religious freedom, destructive of our citizenship, and perilous to the unity of the Empire, we, whose names are underwritten, men of Ulster, loyal subjects of His Gracious Majesty King George V, humbly relying on the God whom our fathers in days of stress and trial confidently trusted, do hereby pledge ourselves in solemn Covenant, throughout this our time of threatened calamity, to stand by one another in defending, for ourselves and our children, our cherished position of equal citizenship in the United Kingdom, and in using all means which may be found necessary to defeat the present conspiracy to set up a Home Rule Parliament in Ireland. And in the event of such a Parliament being forced upon us, we further solemnly and mutually pledge ourselves to refuse to recognise its authority. In sure confidence that God will defend the right, we hereto subscribe our names.
And further, we individually declare that we have not already signed this Covenant.

== The Declaration (for women) ==
We, whose names are underwritten, women of Ulster, and loyal subjects of our gracious King, being firmly persuaded that Home Rule would be disastrous to our Country, desire to associate ourselves with the men of Ulster in their uncompromising opposition to the Home Rule Bill now before Parliament, whereby it is proposed to drive Ulster out of her cherished place in the Constitution of the United Kingdom, and to place her under the domination and control of a Parliament in Ireland.
Praying that from this calamity God will save Ireland, we hereto subscribe our names.

== Demographics ==
The majority of the signatories of the Covenant were from Ulster, although the signing was also attended by several thousand southern unionists.

Acknowledging this, Carson paid tribute to "my own fellow citizens from Dublin, from Wicklow, from Clare [and], yes, from Cork, rebel Cork, who are now holding the hand of Ulster", to cheers from the crowd.

Robert James Stewart, a Presbyterian from Drum, County Monaghan, and the grandfather of Heather Humphreys, the former Minister for the Arts, Heritage and the Gaeltacht in the Republic of Ireland, was one of around 6,000 signatories in County Monaghan, where one quarter of the population was Protestant before the establishment of the Irish Free State. Almost 18,000 people signed either the Covenant or the Declaration in County Donegal. Along with Cavan, Monaghan and Donegal were the three Ulster counties that did not transfer into the new Northern Ireland.

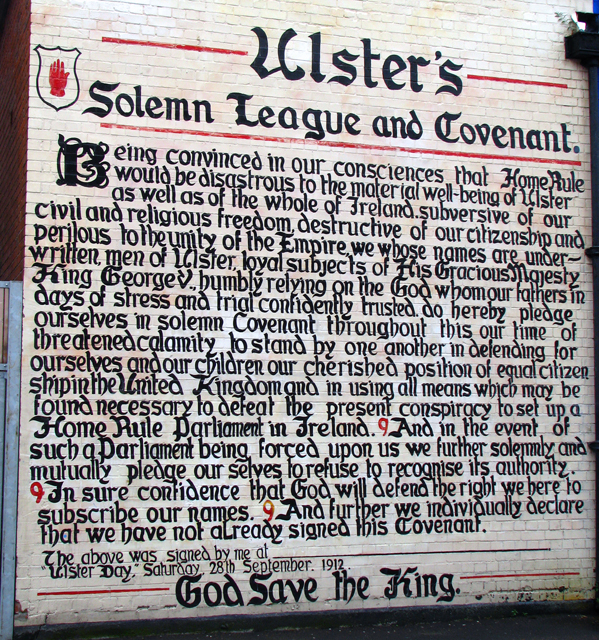
The Covenant on a mural in Thorndyke Street, Belfast

=== By county signed in ===
- Dublin: 768
- Waterford: 56
- Meath: 13
- Limerick: 1
- Mayo: 1
- Louth: 43
- Leitrim: 33
- Kilkenny: 3
- Kildare: 2
- Wicklow: 31
- Not recorded: 84

== Signed-in-blood dispute ==
Prominent Ulster loyalist Frederick H. Crawford claimed his signature on the Covenant was written in his own blood. However, this is disputed. Based on the results of a forensic test that he carried out in September 2012 at PRONI, Dr. Alastair Ruffell of Queen's University Belfast has asserted that he is 90% positive that the signature is not blood. Crawford's signature was injected with a small amount of luminol; this substance reacts with iron in blood's haemoglobin to produce a blue-white glow. The test is very sensitive and can detect tiny traces even in old samples. Crawford's signature is still a rich red colour today which would be unlikely if it had been blood. Nevertheless, some unionists are not convinced by the evidence.

== Solemn League and Covenant ==
The term "Solemn League and Covenant" recalled a key historic document signed in 1643, by which the Scottish Covenanters made a political and military alliance with the leaders of the English Parliamentarians during the First English Civil War.

== Natal Covenant ==
The Ulster Covenant was used as a template for the "Natal Covenant", signed in 1955 by 33,000 British-descended Natalians against the nationalist South African government's intention of declaring the Union a republic. It was signed in Durban's City Hall – itself loosely based on Belfast's, so that the Ulster scene was almost exactly reproduced.

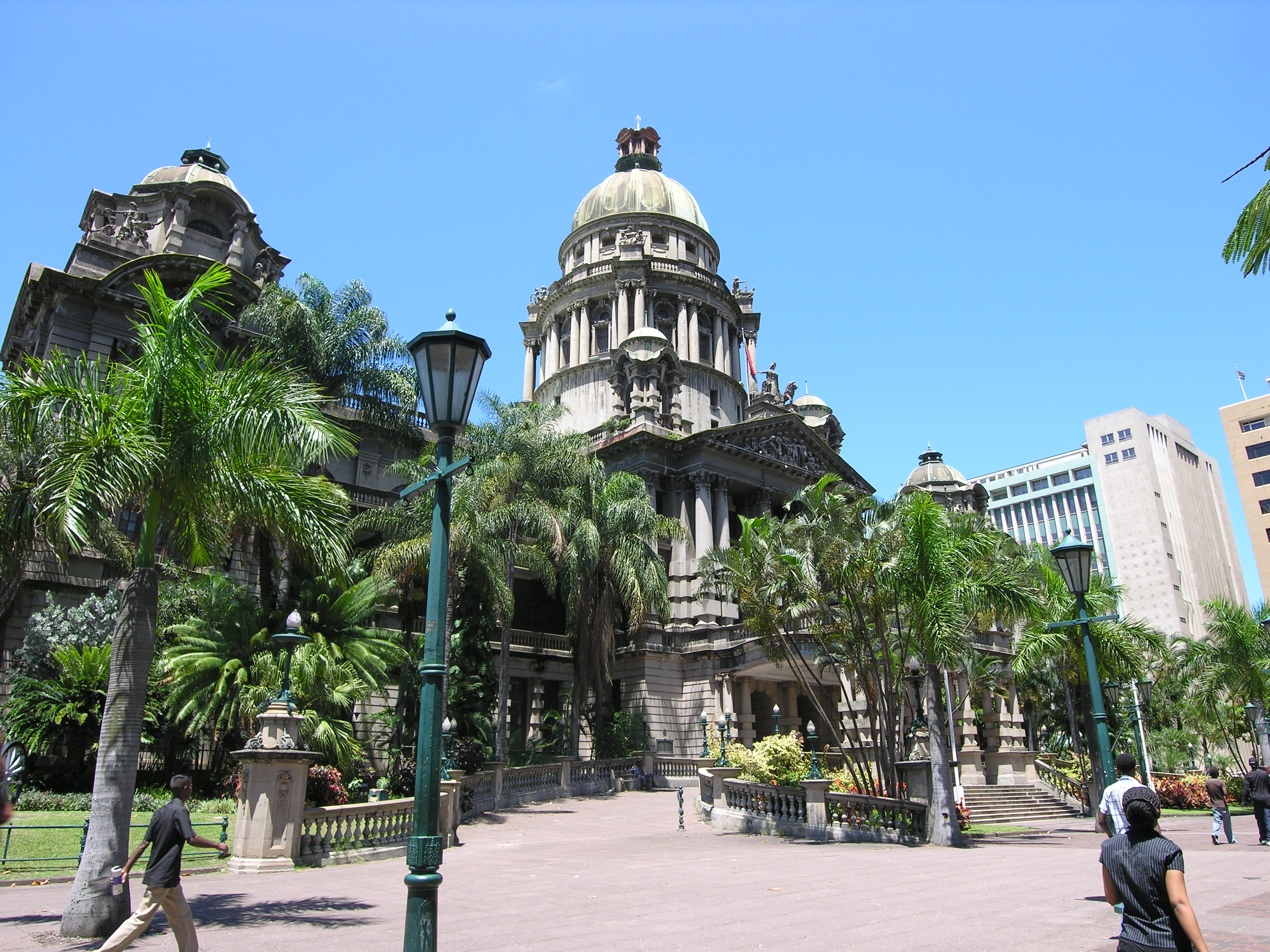
Durban City Hall

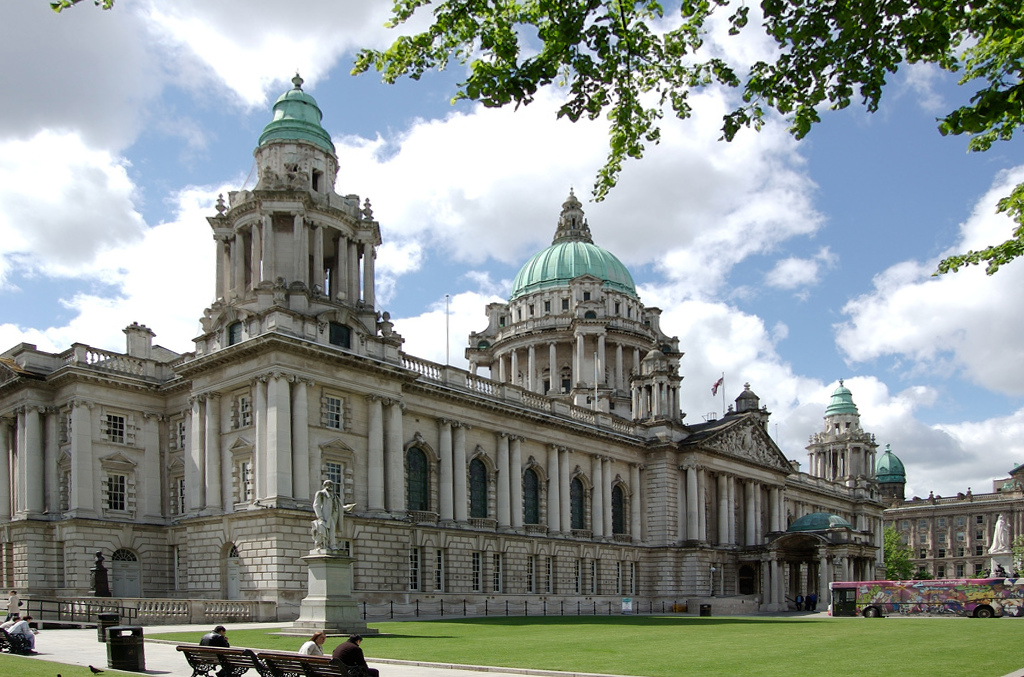
Belfast City Hall

Being convinced in our consciences that a republic would be disastrous to the material well-being of Natal as well as of the whole of South Africa, subversive of our freedom and destructive of our citizenship, we, whose names are underwritten, men and women of Natal, loyal subjects of Her Gracious Majesty Queen Elizabeth the Second, do hereby pledge ourselves in solemn covenant, throughout this our time of threatened calamity, to stand by one another in defending the Crown, and in using all means which may be found possible and necessary to defeat the present intention to set up a republic in South Africa. And in the event of a republic being forced upon us, we further solemnly and mutually pledge ourselves to refuse to recognise its authority. In sure confidence that God will defend the right, we hereto subscribe our names. GOD SAVE THE QUEEN.
