= Orange Order (disambiguation) =

Orange Order, Orange Institution or Loyal Orange Institution is a Protestant fraternal organization.

== Organizations ==
- Orange Order
- Grand Orange Lodge of England
- Grand Orange Lodge of Scotland
- Orange Order in Canada
- Orange Order in New Zealand
- Orange Order in Australia
- Orange Order in the United States
- Orange Order in Africa
- Orange Order in the Republic of Ireland
- Independent Loyal Orange Institution
- Imperial Orange Council
- Down Orange Welfare
- Orange Volunteers (1972)
- Orange Volunteers
- History of the Orange Order

== Other ==
- List of Grand Orange Lodges
- Flag of the Orange Order
- The Orange Standard
