= Loyal Order =

Loyal order or Loyal Order may refer to:

== Fraternal and political organizations ==
- Orange Order
  - Grand Orange Lodge of England
  - Grand Orange Lodge of Scotland
  - Orange Order in Canada
  - Orange Order in New Zealand
  - Orange Order in Australia
  - Orange Order in the United States
  - Orange Order in Africa
  - Orange Order in the Republic of Ireland
- Independent Loyal Orange Institution
- Royal Black Institution
- Royal Arch Purple
- Apprentice Boys of Derry
- Loyal Order of Moose
  - Moose International in Great Britain
- Loyal Order of Ancient Shepherds
- Loyal Order of the Heroes of America

== Other ==
- Loyal Order of Water Buffaloes
- Loyal Order of St. Sava
- Benevolent Loyal Order of Honorable Ancient Redsox Diehard Sufferers
