= Black Saturday demonstrations =

Annual series of parades held by the Royal Black Institution

Royal Black Saturday demonstrations
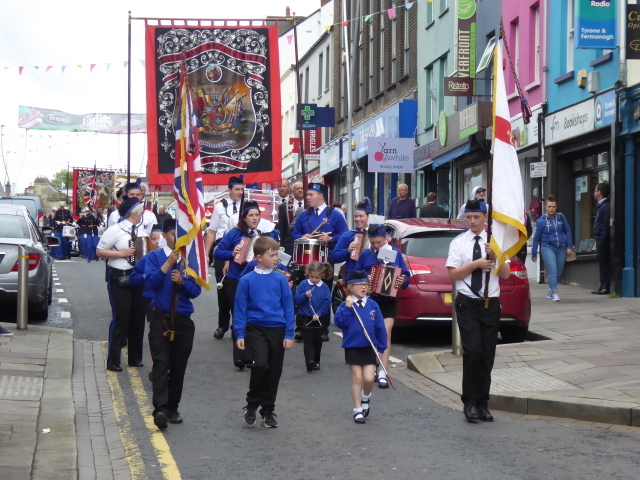
- Black Saturday in Omagh
- Nickname: Black Parade, "The Black"
- Status: Active
- Genre: Protestant/Christian cultural and fraternal parade
- Date: Last Saturday of August
- Frequency: Annually
- Venue: Various
- Locations: Various locations in Ulster, Glasgow and Northern England
- Countries: Northern Ireland, Republic of Ireland, England, Scotland
- Members / Sir Knights: Royal Black Preceptories and accompanying marching bands
- Major events: Parading, marching bands, religious services and platform proceedings
- Organiser: Royal Black Institution

Black Saturday, also known as Last Saturday or the Royal Black Parades, is an annual series of parades organised by the Royal Black Institution (RBI), a Protestant fraternal organisation associated with the loyal orders in Northern Ireland, as well as Great Britain. While the County Chapters in Ulster traditionally hold their demonstrations on the last Saturday of August, the County Fermanagh Grand Black Chapter and the Grand Black Chapter of England hold theirs on the first Saturday of August. The Grand Black Chapter of Scotland hold theirs on the second Saturday of August. The series of Black Saturday parades are regarded by the Institution as the formal conclusion of the annual parading season.

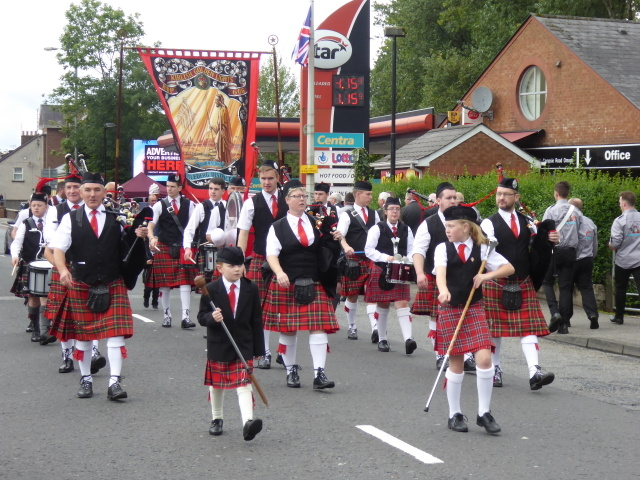
A pipe band playing during a Black Saturday procession

Black Saturday is one of the two main demonstrations in the Royal Black Institution's calendar, with the other being the Royal Thirteenth and Sham Fight, which takes place the day after the Orange Order's Twelfth of July demonstrations.

The event features approximately 17,000 members, called "Sir Knights" across 350 preceptories that make up the Imperial Grand Black Chapter of the British Commonwealth, accompanied by hundreds of marching bands.

== Locations 2026 ==
Grand Black Chapter	Location
County Antrim Grand Black Chapter	Larne
County Armagh Grand Black Chapter	Dungannon
City of Belfast Grand Black Chapter	Dundonald
County Down Grand Black Chapter	Newry
County Fermanagh Grand Black Chapter	Brookeborough
County Londonderry Grand Black Chapter	Coleraine
County Tyrone Grand Black Chapter	Dungannon
Grand Black Chapter of England	Southport and Liverpool
Grand Black Chapter of Scotland	Glasgow

== Structure ==
=== Lead-up ===
A couple of weeks prior to Black Saturday, the host town or village's local preceptory holds a lodge parade through the town, accompanied by a marching band.

An annual divine church parade and service is held in the host town by the county's district chapter on the Sunday before Black Saturday.

=== The day of ===
On the morning of the event, preceptories hold a small parade in their village or town, before travelling to the main procession. Prior to the parade commencing, participants observe a traditional drumhead service accompanied by a wreath-laying ceremony. Preceptories within districts assemble alongside their marching bands.

Sir Knights parade in dark suits, bowler hats, white gloves, and sashes or collarettes, displaying the insignia of their biblical degrees. Banners depict Old and New Testament scenes more than historical or political figures.

Following a rest period, the procession reassembles in the afternoon to march back through the host venue before members travel home for final local feeder marches in their respective districts.

This marks the end of the official marching season. Although the loyal orders also hold parades for Reformation Day, Ulster Day, Shutting of the Gates, and local events later in the year..

=== Characteristics ===
The processions are predominantly distinguished by a more gently paced, dignified cadence.

Grand Master Rev. William Anderson described the annual processions as “flagship events on the parading calendar”.

The County Tyrone and County Armagh Royal Black Chapters sometimes hold a unified demonstration.

Members from Africa, Canada, Australia, New Zealand and the United States take part or are represented.

=== Fermanagh ===
The County Fermanagh Royal Black Chapter's annual Black Saturday demonstration commemorates the 1698 Battle of Newtownbutler on the first Saturday of August.

=== Scotland and England ===
The Black Saturday parade in England is held on the first Saturday in August. Preceptories traditionally gather in the North West, predominantly convening in Southport and Liverpool.

In Scotland, the Grand Black Chapter of Scotland typically holds their annual Black Saturday parade in Glasgow, as well as another town on rotation, which includes Greenock. The demonstration takes place on the second Saturday in August.

== History ==
The Royal Black Institution's Black Saturday is strongest in numbers in eastern Ulster, particularly in Antrim, Down, and Armagh as well as rural districts. Although individual preceptory parades were held throughout the 19th and early 20th centuries, the formal consolidation of Black Saturday was fully established in the interwar period between 1918 and 1939.

In 2005, the County Londonderry Grand Black Chapter held the first ever Black Saturday parade demonstration in the Republic of Ireland, in the town of Raphoe, County Donegal. The parade was led by Raphoe Royal Black District Chapter No. 3. In 2016, Raphoe was the host town for County Londonderry for a second time.

== See also ==
- Imperial Orange Council
- Orange Heritage Week
- Royal Arch Purple
- List of Grand Orange Lodges
- Grand Orange Lodge of Ireland
- Grand Orange Lodge of Scotland
- Grand Orange Lodge of England
- Orange Order in the Republic of Ireland
- Parades in Northern Ireland
- Banners in Northern Ireland
- Apprentice Boys of Derry
- Independent Loyal Orange Institution
