= Grand Orange Lodge =

A Grand Orange Lodge refers to a Grand Lodge under the Loyal Orange Institution.

== National ==
- Grand Orange Lodge of Ireland
  - Orange Order in the Republic of Ireland
- Grand Orange Lodge of Scotland
- Grand Orange Lodge of England
- Grand Orange Lodge of Canada
- Grand Orange Lodge of Australia
- Grand Orange Lodge of New Zealand
- Grand Orange Lodge of Africa
- Grand Orange Lodge of the United States of America

== Other ==
- List of Grand Orange Lodges
