= Museum of Orange Heritage =

- Established: 2015
- Location: Belfast and Loughgall, Northern Ireland
- Coordinates: 54.5715°N 5.894°W; 54°24′37″N 6°36′00″W
- Type: History museum / Cultural archive
- Collections: Orangeism, Glorious Revolution, Ulster history, military heritage, ceremonial textiles and regalia
- Founder: Grand Orange Lodge of Ireland County Armagh Grand Orange Lodge
- Chairperson: Andrew Charles
- Curator: Dr. Jonathan Mattison
- Architect: RPP Architects
- Historian: Sarah Cameron
- Owner: Grand Orange Lodge of Ireland County Armagh Grand Orange Lodge
- Employees: Carly Wallace - Digitisation Officer; David Scott - Services & Outreach Manager
- Public transit access: Translink Loughgall, Village stop Translink Cregagh Library stop
- Website: www.orangeheritage.co.uk

The Museum of Orange Heritage (MOH), also known as the Orange Heritage Museum (OHM), or the Orange Order Museum, is a museum dedicated to the history, traditions and heritage of the Orange Order in Ireland and around the world. It consists of two interpretive centres, Schomberg House on the Cregagh Road, Castlereagh, Belfast, and Sloan's House in Loughgall, County Armagh. The museum was established as a joint project between the Grand Orange Lodge of Ireland and the County Armagh Grand Orange Lodge, with both sites opening in 2015 with support from the European Union's PEACE III Programme to promote peace tourism and explain to a wider audience the role of the Orange Order. Its collections and exhibitions cover the origins and development of the Orange Institution as well as artefacts from the Williamite War in Ireland. It contains the largest collection of Orange artefacts in the world.

In 2020, the Museum of Orange Heritage developed a virtual museum consisting of online resources and lectures. The Museum is visited by dozens of Catholic and Protestant schools in Northern Ireland on an annual basis.

== History ==
In 2004, a Community Education Officer was appointed under the Community Education Programme with the mission to "demystify the communities' perception of the Orange Order and to help them understand the main reason why the organisation exists and the role Orangeism plays in a modern society." The programme has carried out outreach work with schools, ethnic minority and community groups. It was active in the creation of the Museum of Orange Heritage.

Plans to develop an Orange Museum were established through a joint project between the Grand Orange Lodge of Ireland and County Armagh Grand Orange Lodge. The idea was to establish a museum at the headquarters of both Grand Orange Lodges and promote peace and reconciliation. The initiative was made possible through major funding secured from the European Union's PEACE III Programme, managed by the Special EU Programmes Body. The initiative received a £3.6 million grant, and an additional £1 million co-funded by the Dublin government and the Stormont Executive. The main contractor on the project was TAL Ltd and the designing was carriued out by RPP Architects.The Grand Orange Lodge of Ireland headquarters was also expanded and an education facility was added.

The museum compiled a team dedicated to managing, researching, and overseeing projects, exhibitions, artefacts, and community engagement.

In September 2017, Orange Heritage Week was established to promote Ulster-Scots and Orange history. It runs from Diamond Day to Ulster Day, and both Orange Heritage Museum sites are used to hold lectures, fun days, and exhibitions. Diamond Day marks the anniversary of the Battle of the Diamond and the formation of the Orange Order, while Ulster Day marks the anniversary of the signing of the Ulster Covenant.

Schomberg House, the site of the Belfast Orange Heritage Museum site

== Schomberg House ==
Schomberg House has been the serving headquarters of the Grand Orange Lodge of Ireland since 2001. It is named after Marshal Schomberg, 1st Duke of Schomberg, who fought alongside King William III of England during the Williamite War in Ireland.

Also on site is a reception, café, library, lecture room and gift shop.

For administrative purposes, the building contains a research facility and archive used by historians.

It houses a replica lodge room containing a backlit memorial window that commemorates more than 300 Orange members who were killed during the Troubles.

Schomberg House focuses on the 1688 Glorious Revolution and Battle of the Boyne in 1690, through to the spread of Orangeism to North America, Africa, New Zealand and Australia.

In 2023, early editions of the Grand Orange Lodge of Ireland's newspaper The Orange Standard were digitised for online use. These editions were previously only publicly available in the library.

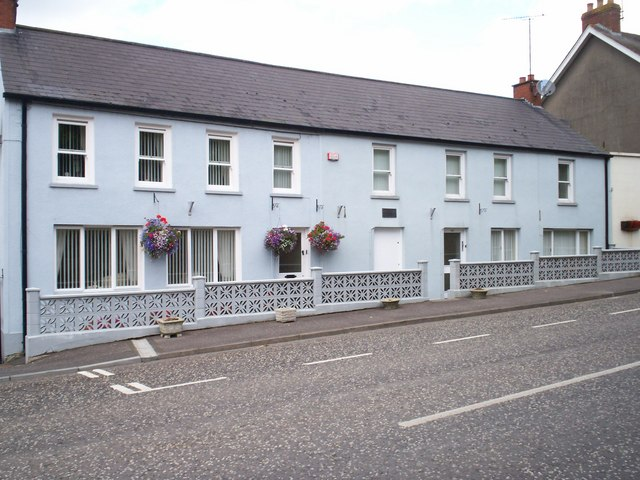
Sloan's Inn, the site of the County Armagh Museum of Orange Heritage

== Sloan's House ==
Sloan's House in Loughgall, County Armagh is used and overseen by the County Armagh Grand Orange Lodge. This museum is situated on Main Street.

It was initially a coaching inn. Shortly after the Battle of the Diamond in 1795, in the parlour of the inn, the decision was taken to form the Orange Order. James Sloan, the inn-keeper, drew up the foundational papers for the institution. The very first Orange warrants were signed and issued to local members who wished to establish their own Loyal Orange Lodge. Sloan served as the secretary.

During the late 18th century, Sloan's was in use as a public house. It remained private property up until October 1959, when the Grand Orange Lodge of Ireland purchased the property. It ran as a small museum and display space, managed by the County Grand Orange Lodge of Armagh.

In 2015, Sloan's House became an Orange Heritage Museum site, with funding provided through the EU PEACE III Programme. An interpretative centre was created. Updates included a replica parlour scene of the signing of the first Orange warrants, alongside updated displays, gift shop and coffee shop, as well as tour guides added to the experience.

Sloan's Coffee Shop is also on site. In 2018, the coffee shop won the Good Food Awards NI Café/Bistro of the Year in the County Armagh category

== Virtual museum ==
During the COVID-19 pandemic in 2020, the Museum of Orange Heritage developed online presentations, documents, videos and PDF's to allow for visitor engagement while the sites were closed. Managed by the institution's digitisation officer, the museum launched digital platforms and online lectures, including special audio and video exhibitions for Orange Heritage Week covering topics such as the Battle of the Diamond and the formation of the Ulster Defence Regiment.

In addition to virtual event programming, the museum operates the "Heritage at Home" digital archive. The digital archive contains manuscripts, reports and information on worldwide Orangeism. It was funded in part through the Covid Recovery Programme for Heritage via The Heritage Fund in Northern Ireland, the project digitized historic manuscripts, printed materials, and global Orange records—making searchable archival collections and early editions of The Orange Standard publicly accessible online.

== Genealogical research ==
The museum's archive serves as a resource for genealogists and family historians seeking to trace ancestry within the Orange Institution. Through historical membership records and lodge numbers, researchers can track family connections and establish contact with local lodges to access regional lodge rolls and records.

== See also ==
- Grand Orange Lodge of Scotland
- Grand Orange Lodge of England
- Orange Order in the Republic of Ireland
- Orange Order in Canada
- Orange Order in the United States
- Orange Order in New Zealand
- Orange Order in Australia
- Orange Order in Africa
- List of Grand Orange Lodges
- Imperial Orange Council
- Royal Arch Purple
- Independent Loyal Orange Institution
