= The Order =

The Order may refer to:

== Books and comics ==
- The Order (novel), 2020 novel by Daniel Silva
- The Order (comics), the name of two comic book superhero teams in the Marvel Comics universe
- The Order, 2024 edition of The Silent Brotherhood (book)

== Computer and video games ==
- The Order: 1886, a video game
- The Order, a fictional terrorist faction in the video game Freelancer (2003)
- The Order (Deus Ex), a fictional pseudo-religious organization in the computer game Deus Ex: Invisible War (2003)
- The Order, a fictional religious group in the video-game franchise Silent Hill (1999, first in series)

== Film and television ==
- The Order (2001 film), an American action film starring Jean-Claude Van Damme
- The Order (2003 film) (also known as The Sin Eater), an American religious thriller starring Heath Ledger
- The Order (2024 film), a Canadian thriller about an FBI agent who goes after a white supremacist terrorist group
- The Order (TV series), a 2019–2020 American horror-drama TV series featuring werewolves and dark magic practitioners

== Organizations ==
- Orange Order, referred to as "the Order" is a Protestant fraternity based in Northern Ireland. Regional Orange Order's include the Canadian Orange Order, United States Orange Order, Scottish Orange Order, English Orange Order and the African Orange Order
- The Latter Day Church of Christ or Davis County Cooperative Society, a Mormon fundamentalist denomination known internally as "The Order"
- Kappa Alpha Order, a fraternity also known as "the Order"
- The Order (white supremacist group), a white-nationalist organization active in the United States between 1983 and 1984

== Geopolitics ==
- Rules-based order, the period of international security, cooperation, and economic liberalism since WWII

== See also ==
- Order (disambiguation)
