= The Orange Standard =

Newspaper

- "Civil and religious liberty for all: special privileges for none"

- Type: Monthly newspaper
- Format: Digital (PDF) and Print
- Owner: Grand Orange Lodge of Ireland
- Publisher: Grand Orange Lodge of Ireland
- President: Tom Haire
- Founded: January 1973
- Language: English
- Headquarters: Schomberg House, Belfast, Northern Ireland
- Circulation: Digital edition: 6,500 subscribers
- Website: goli.org.uk/orangestandard

The Orange Standard is the official monthly newspaper of the Grand Orange Lodge of Ireland. The Orange Order newspaper was established in January 1973. It is available in digital PDF format and in print. It serves the fraternity and community of the Orange Order and Ulster unionists. It covers locally in Northern Ireland, but also world-wide, including the rest of the British Isles, the Orange Order in Africa, Canada, United States and Oceania, and the Imperial Orange Council.

The primary focuses are on lodge news, key dates and locations of Orange marches, Orangeism around the world, politics, historical and religious features and leisure and the community. There is also a youth section for younger readers.

The headquarters' is located at Schomberg House, Belfast, Northern Ireland. This is also the location of the Museum of Orange Heritage.

== Timeline ==
In 1971, the Grand Orange Lodge formed a press committee due to ongoing "one-sided propaganda" from republican circles in the early years of The Troubles. They wanted a dedicated voice to for a unionist and Protestant prospective, as well as promoting the principles of the Reformation. In June 1972 they agreed to have an official Orange publication.

In January 1973, The Orange Standard launched its inaugural edition. The key figures of the production and the formation included Rev Canon Dr Samuel Ernest Long and Dougie Sloan, who was an experienced County Armagh newspaper editor.

In 2017, the Orange Institution began releasing the newspaper as a digital version.

In 2019, the Grand Lodge of Ireland released a new look for print and digital versions of the newspaper.

In 2023, the Grand Lodge of Ireland digitized its early editions of the newspaper to mark the 50th anniversary of The Orange Standard.

The Orange Standard gives politicians the opportunity to reach out to the unionist communities. In March 2026, Ulster Unionist Party leader Jon Burrows spoke about the importance of unionism for the future.

== Regional Orange publications ==
There are a number of publications published by regional Orange Lodges. These include:

- The Orange Torch - official journal of the Loyal Orange Institution of Scotland.
- The Chronicle - official newsletter of the Loyal Orange Institution of England.
- The Orangeman - official newsletter of the Loyal Orange Institution of the United States.
- Sentinel News - official publication of the Loyal Orange Association of Canada.

== See also ==
- History of the Orange Order
- Independent Loyal Orange Institution
- Royal Arch Purple
- Royal Black Institution
- Apprentice Boys of Derry
- Orange Order in the Republic of Ireland
- Orange Order in Africa
- Orange Order in New Zealand
- Orange Order in Australia
- Imperial Orange Council
