= Black Parade =

Black Parade may refer to:

- "Black Parade" (song), a 2020 song by Beyoncé
- The Black Parade, a 2006 album by My Chemical Romance
  - "Welcome to the Black Parade", lead single from the album
- Black Parade, a 1935 novel by Jack Jones
- Royal Black Parades, organized by the Royal Black Institution
