= List of Grand Orange Lodges =

List of Grand Orange Lodges under the Loyal Orange Institution

This is a list of all Grand Orange Lodges within the Orange Order, Grand Orange Lodges of the Independent Loyal Orange Institution, as well as head associations under the same principle.

A Grand Orange Lodge is the governing body that oversees Loyal Orange Lodges, also called private lodges within a particular geographical area, known as its jurisdiction. Depending on the country, a Grand Orange Lodge may be a county, national or other type of regional Grand Orange Lodge. The role of the Grand Orange Lodge is to manage and oversee the local districts, as well as the private Orange Lodges. The Grand Orange Lodge of Ireland is the mother Grand Lodge of the institution, established in 1798 following the foundation of the order in Loughgall, County Armagh, Northern Ireland in 1795.

Representatives of all Grand Orange Lodges meet every three years at the Imperial Orange Council, held in a location chosen by the board.

== Africa ==
=== National ===
- Grand Orange Lodge of Togo
- Grand Orange Lodge of Ghana

==== Defunct ====
- Grand Orange Lodge of West Africa (split into Togo and Ghana)
- Grand Orange Lodge of British South Africa
- Grand Orange Lodge of Nigeria

== Australia ==
Flag of the Grand Orange Lodge of Australia

=== National ===
- Grand Orange Lodge of Australia

==== Defunct ====
- Grand Orange Lodge of Australasia

Flag of the Grand Orange Lodge of Victoria

=== State ===
- Grand Orange Lodge of New South Wales
- Grand Orange Lodge of Western Australia
- Grand Orange Lodge of South Australia
- Grand Orange Lodge of Queensland
- Grand Orange Lodge of Victoria

==== Defunct ====
- Grand Orange Lodge of Tasmania

== Canada ==
Flag of the Grand Orange Lodge of Canada

=== National ===
- Grand Orange Lodge of Canada
- Grand Lodge of the Loyal Orange Ladies Association of Canada

==== Defunct ====
- Grand Orange Lodge of British America (now the Grand Orange Lodge of Canada)

=== Provincial ===
- Grand Orange Lodge of Ontario
- Grand Orange Lodge of Ontario East
- Grand Orange Lodge of Ontario West
- Ontario Ladies Provincial Orange Lodge
- Grand Orange Lodge of Toronto
- Grand Orange Lodge of Newfoundland and Labrador
- Newfoundland & Labrador Ladies Provincial Orange Lodge
- Grand Orange Lodge of New Brunswick
- New Brunswick Ladies Provincial Orange Lodge
- Grand Orange Lodge of Nova Scotia
- Grand Orange Lodge of Manitoba
- Grand Orange Lodge of Western Canada
- Grand Orange Lodge of Saskatchewan
- Grand Orange Lodge of Alberta
- Grand Orange Lodge of British Columbia

==== Defunct ====
- Grand Orange Lodge of Prince Edward Island
- County Orange Lodge of East Middlesex
- County Orange Lodge of West Middlesex

== England ==
=== National ===
- Grand Orange Lodge of England (and Wales)
- Ladies’ Grand Orange Council of England

=== Provincial ===
- Liverpool Provincial Grand Orange Lodge
- Manchester Provincial Grand Orange Lodge
- Northern Provincial Grand Orange Lodge
- Metropolitan Provincial Grand Orange Lodge (London)
- Midlands Provincial Grand Orange Lodge
- County Grand Orange Lodge of Merseyside (ILOL)

== New Zealand ==
=== National ===
Flag of the Grand Orange Lodge of New Zealand

- Grand Orange Lodge of New Zealand

==== Defunct ====
- Grand Orange Lodge of the North Island
- Grand Orange Lodge of the South Island

Both of these lodges merged into the Grand Orange Lodge of New Zealand in 1908.

== Northern Ireland ==
=== National ===
- Grand Orange Lodge of Ireland
- Imperial Independent Grand Orange Lodge of Ireland
- Association of Loyal Orange Women of Ireland

Grand Orange Lodge of Ireland and international Orange Institution flag

=== Provincial ===
- County Grand Orange Lodge of Antrim
- County Grand Orange Lodge of Armagh
- County Grand Orange Lodge of Belfast
- County Grand Orange Lodge of Down
- County Grand Orange Lodge of Fermanagh
- County Grand Orange Lodge of Londonderry
- County Grand Orange Lodge of Tyrone
- City of Londonderry Grand Orange Lodge
- County Antrim Independent Grand Orange Lodge
- County Belfast Independent Grand Orange Lodge

==== Defunct ====
- Grand Orange Lodge of Ulster
- Independent Grand Orange Lodge of Carrickfergus

The Grand Orange Lodge of Ireland has over 1,000 private lodges in Northern Ireland and the Republic of Ireland.

== Republic of Ireland ==
=== Provincial ===
- County Grand Orange Lodge of Donegal
- County Grand Orange Lodge of Cavan
- County Grand Orange Lodge of Monaghan
- County Grand Orange Lodge of Leitrim

== Scotland ==
=== National ===
- Grand Orange Lodge of Scotland
- Ladies Orange Association of Scotland

=== Provincial ===
- County Grand Lodge of Ayrshire, Renfrewshire & Argyll
- County Grand Lodge of Central Scotland
- County Grand Lodge of East of Scotland
- County Grand Lodge of Glasgow

== United States of America ==
=== National ===
- Grand Orange Lodge of the United States of America
- Ladies’ Auxiliary of the Grand Orange Lodge of the United States

=== State ===
- State Grand Orange Lodge of Missouri
- State Grand Orange Lodge of Pennsylvania
- State Grand Orange Lodge of New York
- State Grand Orange Lodge of New Jersey
- State Grand Orange Lodge of Massachusetts
- State Grand Orange Lodge of Illinois

== Isle of Man ==
- Grand Orange Lodge of the Isle of Man
- Grand Lodge of the Loyal Orange Institution Douglas

== See also ==
- Imperial Orange Council
- Orange Heritage Week
- Royal Arch Purple
- Royal Black Institution
- Apprentice Boys of Derry
- Independent Loyal Orange Institution
- Black Saturday demonstrations
- Culture of Ulster
- Banners in Northern Ireland
- Parades in Northern Ireland
