= Blowhard =

Blowhard may refer to:

== Places ==
- Blowhard, Victoria, a rural locality in Australia
- Blowhard Stream, a tributary of the Garry River in Canterbury, New Zealand
- Blowhard Ravine, a valley of the West Branch Feather River at Inskip, California, US

== Arts and entertainment ==
- Blowhard (album), by the noise rock band DUH
- Blowhard (film), a 1979 Canadian animated film by Brad Caslor and Christopher Hinton
- Blowhard (The Tunnelers), a fictional character in Marvel Comics
- Broken Down Race Horse (Blowhard), a 1967 sculpture by Winston Bronnum in Penobsquis, New Brunswick, Canada
- "Blowhard", an episode of US TV comedy series Action
- "Blowhard", a song on the album Rub It Better by British band General Public

== Other uses ==
- Waycross Blowhards, a former name of the minor league baseball team Waycross Moguls, from Waycross, Georgia, US

== See also ==
- BLOHARDS, supporters of the Boston Red Sox baseball team
