= Imperial Orange Council =

International council body of the Loyal Orange Institution

- Abbreviation: IOC
- Nickname: World Orange Council
- Established: July 18, 1866
- Founded at: Clifton Street; Belfast; County Antrim
- Legal status: Fraternity
- Purpose: International coordination of Loyal Orange Lodges
- Location: Iterant
- Region served: World-wide
- Imperial Grand Master: Edward Stevenson
- Publication: The Orange Standard
- Parent organization: Orange Institution

The Imperial Orange Council (IOC), also referred to simply as the Orange Council, and sometimes the World Orange Council or International Orange Council, is an internal council that serves the Loyal Orange Institution, also known as the Orange Order, a Protestant fraternity based in Northern Ireland and founded in 1795.

Imperial Orange Council officials include an elected Imperial Grand Master, Treasurer and Secretary. A Ladies' Meeting also takes place during the Imperial Orange Council event to discuss Women's Orange Lodges.

The Imperial Orange Council was founded in July 1866 to unite all Grand Orange Lodges around the world following the first international Orange Conference held at Belfast Orange Hall. The international Orange Council meeting is held in a different location in July triennially, with up to 170 delegates attending, and takes place over a couple of days. Grand Masters from all around the world attend, including England, Scotland, Togo, Ghana, Canada, United States, Australia and New Zealand.

== History ==
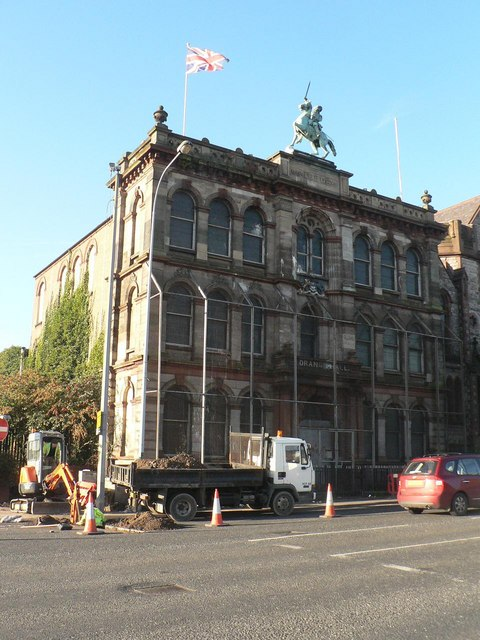
Belfast Orange Hall, Clifton Street, location of the first international Orange Conference in 1866

The Imperial Orange Council was established on 18 July 1866, following the first international Orange Conference was held at Belfast Orange Hall on Clifton Street, north Belfast.

In 1994, the first Imperial Orange Council meeting was held in the Southern Hemisphere, when the Loyal Orange Institution of New Zealand hosted the meeting in Auckland. That same year, Emmanuel Aboki Essien became the first African Imperial Grand Master, and coincidentally the first French speaking Imperial Grand Master was elected. The Togolese Orangeman joined Orange Lodges in his home country as well as Ghana.

In 2009, members travelled to Belfast for the meeting in Stormont, Belfast.

In 2012, the Imperial Orange Council meeting took place at the Crowne Plaza Hotel in Melbourne, Australia. Delegates from Ghana and Togo were denied access due to visa issues.

In 2015, the Imperial Orange Council met in Liverpool, England.

In 2018, the Orange council met in Edinburgh, Scotland.

The 2021 Orange Council meeting was cancelled due to the COVID-19 pandemic.

In 2024, Enniskillen hosted the Imperial Orange Council meeting for the first time. This was the first time the meeting was held for 6 years, with the last one being 2018.

== National Grand Orange Lodges involved ==
Grand Orange Lodges involved are in the Imperial Orange Council are:

- Grand Orange Lodge of Ireland
- Grand Orange Lodge of Scotland
- Grand Orange Lodge of England
- Grand Orange Lodge of Canada
- Grand Orange Lodge of the United States of America
- Grand Orange Lodge of Australia
- Grand Orange Lodge of New Zealand
- Grand Orange Lodge of Ghana
- Grand Orange Lodge of Togo

== See also ==
- Royal Arch Purple
- Royal Black Institution
- Apprentice Boys of Derry
- Independent Loyal Orange Institution
- Orange Heritage Week
- Ulster Covenant
- List of Grand Orange Lodges
- Black Saturday demonstrations
