= Grand Orange Lodge of Ireland =

Governing body of the Orange Order on the island of Ireland

- GOLI
- Founded: April 1798; Dublin, Ireland
- Type: Protestant fraternity
- Affiliation: Imperial Grand Black Chapter of the British Commonwealth; Junior Grand Orange Lodge of Ireland
- Status: Active
- Scope: Island of Ireland
- Motto: "Fear God, Honour the King"
- Slogan: "No Surrender!"
- Colors: Orange and Purple
- Flag: The Boyne Standard
- Flower: Orange Lilly
- Publication: The Orange Standard
- Chapters: 1,000+
- Headquarters: Schomberg House, 368 Cregagh Road; Belfast, Ulster; Northern Ireland
- Website: https://www.goli.org.uk/

The Grand Orange Lodge of Ireland (GOLI) is the governing body and authority of the Orange Order on the island of Ireland. It was established in 1798 in Dublin after the first Orange lodges were founded in 1795 in County Armagh. The Grand Orange Lodge oversees the county and district Orange lodges across the Republic of Ireland and Northern Ireland. There are national Grand Orange Lodges in Great Britain, Africa, North America, and Oceania. The Junior Grand Orange Lodge of Ireland (JGOLI) was established in 1925 for members under 18. The Junior Grand Lodge holds their own parades.

The organisation is best known for organising annual commemorative events and parades, the most notable being the Twelfth of July, which commemorates King William III's victory at the Battle of the Boyne in 1690.

Today, the Grand Orange Lodge of Ireland oversees more than 1,000 primary lodges and 126 districts in Ireland. The current Grand Master is Harold Henning. The headquarters is located on Cregagh Road, Belfast. The headquarters is also home to the Association of Loyal Orangewomen of Ireland (ALOI) and the Museum of Orange Heritage.

== County Grand Orange Lodges in Ireland ==
The Grand Orange Lodge of Ireland oversees the County Grand Orange Lodges.

=== Northern Ireland ===
- County Antrim Grand Orange Lodge
- County Armagh Grand Orange Lodge
- County Grand Orange Lodge of Belfast
- City of Londonderry County Grand Orange Lodge
- County Down Grand Orange Lodge
- County Fermanagh Grand Orange Lodge
- County Londonderry Grand Orange Lodge
- County Tyrone Grand Orange Lodge

=== Republic of Ireland ===
- County Cavan Grand Orange Lodge
- County Donegal Grand Orange Lodge
- County Leitrim Grand Orange Lodge
- County Monaghan Grand Orange Lodge

== History ==
Schomberg House, headquarters of The Grand Orange Lodge of Ireland

=== Background ===
The Orange Order was established in Loughgall, County Armagh, following the Battle of the Diamond on 21 September 1795. A meeting was promptly held in Dan Winter's home, where James Wilson, James Sloan and Dan Winter created a plan to establish an organisation. Following this, a meeting was held in James Sloan's Inn to formally establish the Loyal Orange Institution. The first warrants to establish an Orange lodge were signed at Sloan's, who became the secretary for the Orange Order.

=== Grand Orange Lodge of Ulster ===
In July 1797, the Grand Lodge of Ulster was established in Portadown. It seemed to have little control in Ulster and was disbanded.

=== Establishment of the Grand Orange Lodge of Ireland ===
In April 1798, the Grand Orange Lodge of Ireland was formally established, with its headquarters based on Dawson Street, Dublin. The first grand master was Thomas Verner, who also founded the first Orange Lodge in Dublin. The first meeting was held on 9 April.

Thomas Verner resigned in 1801, and was succeeded by George Ogle.

=== Dissolution ===
In March 1825, in response to government restrictions on oath-bound societies, the Grand Orange Lodge of Ireland voluntarily dissolved itself and revisited its rules to operate legally without formal oaths.

In 1836, following a British parliamentary investigation into Orange lodges within the military and the political activities of Grand Master Prince Ernest Augustus, Duke of Cumberland, the Grand Lodge voted to formally dissolve its governing apparatus. The organisation was accused of a treasonous plot known as the "Orange Conspiracy".

=== Re-establishment ===
County lodges continued operating until the Grand Orange Lodge of Ireland was officially re-established in late 1845 when the Party Procession Act expired. Lord Enniskillen served as the Grand Master.

=== Fowler Memorial Hall ===
In 1898, the Grand Orange Lodge of Ireland moved north in the city to Fowler Memorial Hall in Rutland Square at the top of O'Connell Street.

=== Role in opposing Irish Home Rule ===
The Grand Orange Lodge worked with the Ulster Unionist Council in 1905, which was under the Ulster Unionist Party. Delegates were appointed to represent the Orange Order in the council.

=== Irish Civil War and move to Northern Ireland ===
In March 1922, during the Irish Civil War, the Grand Orange Lodge headquarters in Dublin was damaged and seized by the Irish Republican Army. The Grand Orange Lodge of Ireland was already in the process of moving to Belfast, and it relocated to Donegall Square North following the foundation of the Irish Free State.

In December 1926, the headquarters moved to Donegall Square West.

In 1936, Orangemen were attacked in what would be the last Orange parade in Dublin when they marched from the old GOLI headquarters, Fowler Memorial Hall, to Amiens Street Station to travel via train to Belfast for the Twelfth of July processions.

=== Dublin Road (1950s–2001) ===
By the end of the 1940s, the Grand Orange Lodge of Ireland moved to 65–71 Dublin Road, Belfast by 1951.

==== House of Orange ====
In the 1970s, the headquarters was updated, Grand Secretary Walter Williams worked with the construction workers during planning and construction. On 26 April 1975, Grand Master W. Martin Smyth officially opened the newly developed building with thousands in attendance for the opening.

In 1976, the headquarters was bombed by the Irish Republican Army during The Troubles.

In March 2000, the Lord Mayor of Dublin, Mary Freehill, invited members of the Orange Order to hold a parade in Dublin for the first time in over 60 years to commemorate the establishment of the Grand Orange Lodge of Ireland on Dawson Street. It was intended to be a small-scale parade led by the Dublin & County Wicklow Loyal Orange Lodge, with marching bands playin hymns rather than unionist songs. Although Sinn Féin strongly condemned the invitation, Orangemen attended the event in May 2000 to unveil the plaque at the site of the Grand Orange Lodge's founding, though the parade itself didn't take place as organisers cancelled it after feeling intimidated following controversy.

=== Schomberg House (2001–Present) ===
In April 2001, the Grand Orange Lodge of Ireland moved to Schomberg House, located at 368 Cregagh Road in East Belfast. The headquarters was named in honour of Friedrich Herman von Schomberg, 1st Duke of Schomberg, King William III's second-in-command who was killed at the Battle of the Boyne in 1690.

==== Redevelopment ====
In the early 2010s, Shomberg House went under a £3.8 million redevelopment plan to add a museum and expansion of the site, which included a public archive. The renovated Schomberg House opened in the summer of 2015, doubling in size.

==== Museum of Orange Heritage ====
The Museum of Orange Heritage was a joint project between the Grand Orange Lodge of Ireland and the County Armagh Grand Orange Lodge. The latter opened the Orange Heritage Museum at Sloan's Inn, Loughgall, at the same time as the Belfast site. The project was supported by the European Union's PEACE III Programme.

=== 21st-century ===
In June 2025, a centenary parade was held in Lisburn to mark the 100th anniversary of the Junior Grand Orange Lodge of Ireland establishment, with thousands in attendance.

==== Orange Heritage Week ====
In 2017, the Grand Orange Lodge of Ireland established Orange Heritage Week. It is a celebration of Orangeism and loyalism in Northern Ireland. It usually takes place during the last week of September, coinciding with Diamond Day, which commemorates the Battle of the Diamond and establishment of the Orange Order, and concludes with Ulster Day, an important day for Unionism as thousands signed the Ulster Covenant to oppose Irish Home Rule.

==== Orange Victims Week ====
In 2018, the Grand Orange Lodge of Ireland designated 1 September as Orange Victims Day to remember Orangemen who have lost their lives. The date was chosen to mark the anniversary of the Tullyvallen Massacre, a 1975 Provisional IRA mass shooting at the Tullyvallen Orange Hall, resulting in the deaths of five Orangemen during a ceasefire.

== See also ==
- Orange Order in the Republic of Ireland
- Orange Order in Africa
- Orange Order in New Zealand
- Orange Order in Australia
- Orange Order in Canada
- Orange Order in the United States
- Grand Orange Lodge of England
- Imperial Orange Council
- Royal Black Institution
- Apprentice Boys of Derry
- Royal Arch Purple
- Parades in Northern Ireland
- Banners in Northern Ireland
- Independent Loyal Orange Institution
