= BLOHARDS =

Supporters of the Boston Red Sox baseball team

The BLOHARDS (Benevolent Loyal Order of Honorable Ancient Redsox Diehard Sufferers) are a New York City-based group that supports the Boston Red Sox baseball team.

== History ==
The BLOHARDS were founded around 1965 by Jim Powers of Weston, Connecticut when about dozen New York City-based Red Sox fans got together to drink and discuss the Red Sox. Author Henry Berry served as senior vice president. The group pulls most of its members from New York, New Jersey and Connecticut.

Members of the group meet regularly, and when the Red Sox play the Yankees at Yankee Stadium, the group organizes bus trips for members to attend games. Beginning in 1968, the BLOHARDS have traveled to Boston for Opening Day at Fenway Park.

By 1986, there were about 300 members, including then-National League president and future Commissioner of Baseball Bart Giamatti.
