= Grand Orange Lodge of England =

Orange Order in England and Wales

- Abbreviation: GOLE
- Nickname: Orange Order in England and Wales
- Formation: 1808
- Founder: Colonel Samuel Taylor
- Founded at: Manchester
- Legal status: Religious brotherhood
- Headquarters: 54 St James Street, Liverpool
- Region served: England and Wales Previous: Africa, Isle of Man
- Grand Master: Tim Lord
- Main organ: Trustees, Senior Officer Bearers
- Publication: The Chronicle
- Parent organization: Orange Institution
- Website: www.gole.org.uk

The Grand Orange Lodge of England (GOLE), also known as the Loyal Orange Institution of England, is the governing body of the Orange Institution in England and Wales.

Established in 1808, the English Grand Orange Lodge oversees local lodges and the 5 district lodges. Historically, English Orangeism developed largely among Protestant migrants from Ireland, particularly in historical industrial areas such as Liverpool, Manchester, and Tyneside.

The Grand Lodge promotes Orange heritage, including the Glorious Revolution, loyalty to the British Monarchy and sharing and displaying their civil and religious liberties. The current Grand Master is Most Worshipful Master Tim Lord. Representatives travel triennially to take part in the Imperial Orange Council meetings.

The main centralised Twelfth of July demonstration is annually held in the seaside resort town of Southport, Merseyside as well as in the city of Liverpool. Within the regional districts, all lodges alongside their marching bands travel to take part in the parades.

The Ladies’ Grand Orange Council of England is the governing body for women's Orange lodges in England.

The Chronicle is the official newsletter of the Loyal Orange Institution of England.

== History ==
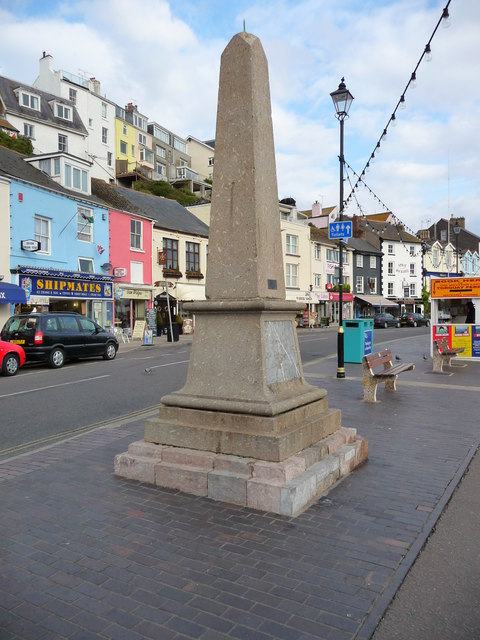
William of Orange Monument Pillar in Brixham, Devon, It commemorates where William of Orange came ashore to become the King of England.

=== Origins ===
On 5 November, William of Orange landed in Brixham accompanied by 14,000 Dutch, French, Brandenburger, Swede and Finn soldiers to initiate the Glorious Revolution to depose the Catholic King James II.

Following this, the first English Orange association was formed at Exeter Cathedral that month. It consisted of the nobles, gentlemen, and soldiers who rallied around William of Orange during the Glorious Revolution to defend the Protestant religion. At this time the majority of England's people were Protestant and favoured William of Orange. These first members accompanied William of Orange to Exeter. Englishmen also provided support for him over in the Netherlands.

=== Formal Grand Orange Lodge ===
The Orange Order made its way to the North-West of England from the influence of Irish Protestants and Ulster Scots moving to Great Britain. In Manchester, Orange members gathered to hold meetings in 1801.

The Grand Orange Lodge of England was first formed in 1808, following the establishment of the initial County Grand Lodge in Manchester in 1807. English regiments that had been stationed in Ireland to suppress the 1798 United Irishmen Rebellion brought Irish warrants back to the mainland and joined their local English Orange Lodges. Samuel Taylor was the first Grand Master of the English Grand Orange Lodge. He was a soldier who fought in the Irish Rebellion.

In the 1810s and 1820s, the English industrial landscape was more volatile due to the Industrial Revolution. Cities in the north would see early Orange parades clash with radical working-class reformers, breaking out in street violence and public bans by magistrates who viewed the Order as a disruptive influence.

=== Royal Grand Master and dissolution ===
In 1817, the Grand Orange Lodge of England achieved a massive peak in social status when Prince Ernest Augustus, the Duke of Cumberland and the fifth son of King George III, became the Orange Order Grand Master until 1836.

In 1835, an inquest was made due to the British government's concern with the Grand Lodge's strong political influence. They discovered that the Duke of Cumberland had been secretly signing Orange warrants inside the British Army. Immense pressure was put on The Crown due to fear of a subversion of the army or a coup.

In 1836, the Duke of Cumberland was forced to officially dissolve the Grand Orange Lodge of England.

In the 1840s, the Great Famine brought an influx of Irish Catholic immigrants to Liverpool. This led to sectarian violence amongst Protestants and Catholics. Consequently, Orange Order membership spiked amongst Protestants in response to the violence.

=== Re-establishment ===
In 1850, Pope Pius IX restored the Catholic Church hierarchy in England, when he issued the papal bull Universalis Ecclesiae. This sparked massive anti-Catholic backlash among the English public. The Orange Order capitalised on this, officially reforming the Grand Orange Lodge of England out of secrecy to defend the Protestant constitution.

==== Tory Democracy ====
During the late 19th century, the GOLE became an incredibly powerful political tool in Liverpool. The Conservative Party formed an alliance with the Orange Lodges to cultivate a vote known as "Tory Democracy". The political alliance allowed the Conservatives to completely dominate local and parliamentary elections for generations.

Archibald Salvidge, the organiser of he Liverpool Working Men's Conservative Association courted the allegiance of the Grand Orange Lodge. On the Twelfth of July 1891, publicly proclaimed that his principles and those of the Orangemen were identical, as the WMCA strictly mandated its members "to be a sound Protestant".

==== Liverpool FC ====
One of the most England's most prominent members of the Orange Order during the late 19th century was businessman and brewer John Houlding. He went on to become the Lord Mayor of Liverpool.

Originally serving as the president of Everton F.C., Houlding owned the stadium land at Anfield Road and mandated that players use his nearby pub, the Sandon Hotel, as their changing facility. A bitter internal schism arose in 1892 when Everton's board members, many of whom were teetotal Methodists, grew frustrated with Houlding’s commercial brewery links, land price increases, and overt leadership within Liverpool's loyalist and Masonic fraternities. When the Everton board vacated Anfield to construct Goodison Park, Houlding was left with an empty stadium.

Houlding subsequently used an Orange Lodge meeting to recruit his close associate, Irish-born administrator John McKenna, into his sporting plans. Together with several fellow Orange Order members and Conservative figures who sat on the inaugural board of directors, Houlding officially founded Liverpool Football Club in March 1892 to occupy the vacant Anfield grounds. His death in 1902 was attended by thousands of local citizens, politicians, and members of the Orange Institution in Everton Cemetery to pay their last respects.

=== World War I ===
Thousands of English Orangemen volunteered for the British army to fight in World War I. In cities including Liverpool and Manchester, large numbers of members joined local "Pals battalions," such as the King’s Regiment of Liverpool. Private Abraham Acton of Whitehaven, a member of the English Orange Association, became the first Orangeman awarded the Victoria Cross in World War I for conspicuous bravery at Rouges Bancs in December 1914.

The English Grand Orange Lodge facilitated religious and fraternal practices on the battlefront by backing the issuance of mobile field warrants. This allowed soldiers and sailors, including Royal Navy vessels, to host impromptu lodge meetings in camps and trenches. In 1916, records show an active Orange lodge was even covertly operating within a German prisoner-of-war camp.

The women's Orange Lodges became active in war-relief efforts, notably at the Trent Bridge cricket ground in Nottingham, which had been converted into a military hospital. Backed by Ulster Unionist and English Orange patrons, the west wing pavilion of the facility was transformed into a dedicated "Orange Ward" and "Ulster Hut". This specialised unit catered to recovering wounded Orangemen.

=== Mid to late 20th-century ===
In 1982, the Grand Orange Lodge of England launched a campaign to oppose Pope John Paul II's visit to Great Britain in May. The Grand Lodge publicly framed the state's official welcome of Pope John Paul II as a direct constitutional challenge to the Protestant principles enshrined within the Bill of Rights 1689 and the Coronation Oath. The Grand Lodge argued that by officially welcoming the Pope with full state honours, the British government was politically undermining the strictly Protestant legal foundation upon which the modern British state was built.

==== The Troubles ====
When The Troubles broke out, political tensions and ongoing violence led to a boost in membership. New Orange Lodges were formed and lodges were even revived in Yorkshire, Sheffield, and the Midlands by motivated Unionists working in the mainland during the 1970's and 1980's.

=== 21st-century ===
In 2020, Orange parades, including the Twelfth of July in Southport and Liverpool, were cancelled due to the COVID-19 pandemic.

==== Brixham ====
In 2025, a new Orange Lodge known as William Prince of Orange LOL 1 was established in Brixham, Devon. Over 142 members applied to join the Orange Lodge. This quickly made it the biggest Orange Lodge in England. It is associated with the Plymouth District.

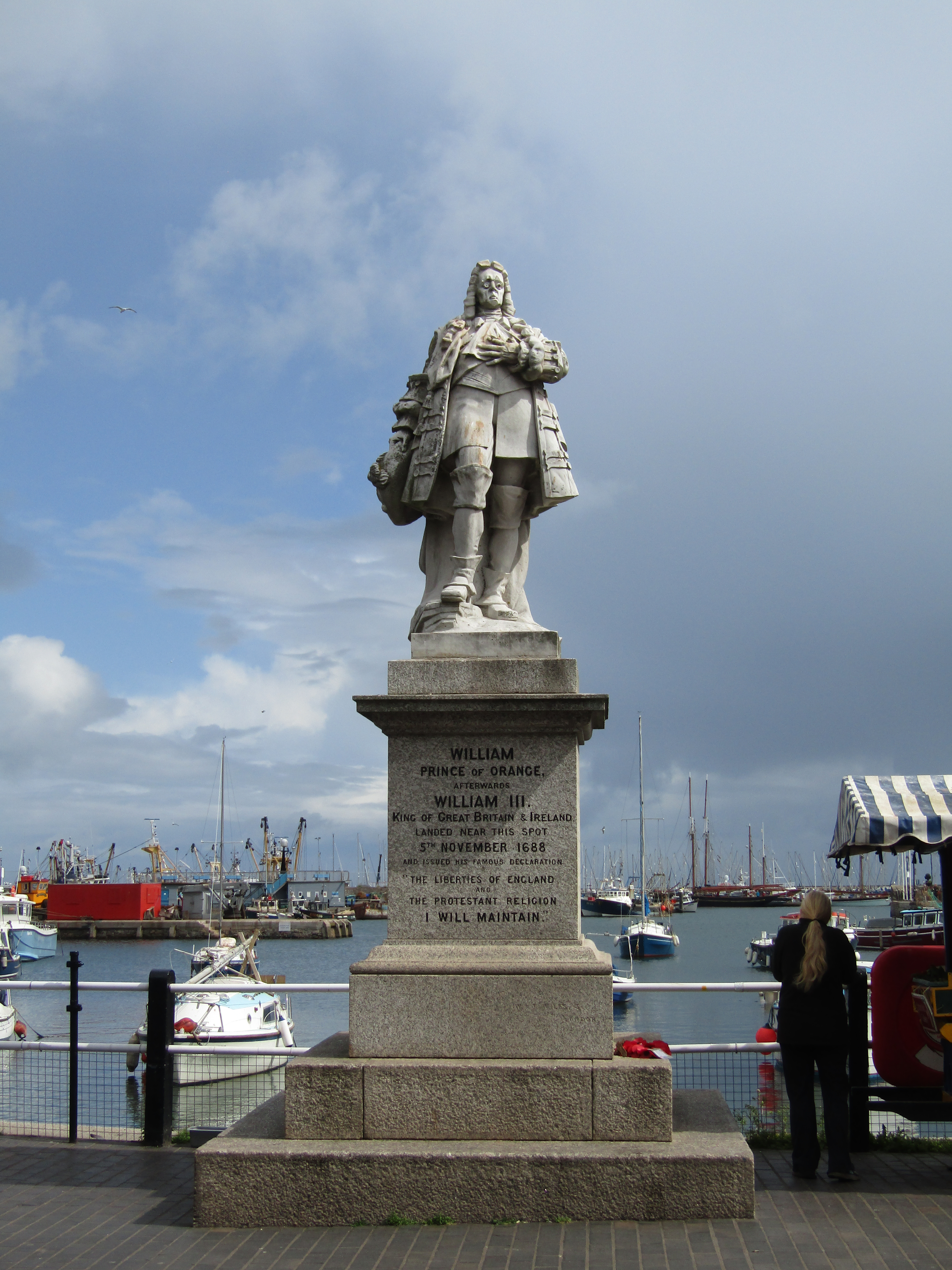
William III of Orange statue, Brixham, Devon

The town once had an Orange Lodge known as Peter Varwell LOL 1690, from the 1920's and dissolved around WWII.

The fishing town has a close connection with Orangeism, as Brixham is the location of where William of Orange landed in 1688. The spot is marked and commemorated with a pillar monument. As well as this, beside the harbour stands a large statue of William of Orange.

== Wales ==
Welsh Orange Lodges are under the Grand Orange Lodge of England.

The earliest documented Orange activity in Wales dates to the early nineteenth century. According to later Orange Order histories, Welsh regiments serving in Ireland during the suppression of the 1798 Irish Rebellion may have introduced Orangeism to Wales after returning with Orange warrants.

The earliest known contemporary reference to Orange lodges in Wales appeared in The Cambrian on 18 October 1834, which reported a festival of Aberdare Loyal Orange Lodge No. 335 attended by members from Aberdare, Merthyr Tydfil, Newbridge, and Cardiff. The event included a procession and church service followed by a dinner.

Cardiff City Loyal Orange Lodge No. 803 was established in the Grangetown district of Cardiff on 19 April 1907 and was associated with St Paul's Church.

During its existence, the lodge met at several locations, including St Andrew's Parish Hall on Wyverne Road and later the Maendy Brickworks. Several members served in the British army during the First World War, and at least one member was killed while serving at sea. The lodge remained active after the war but was last recorded in the records of the Grand Orange Lodge of England in 1921.

After decades of no official Orange Lodge in Wales, on Saint Patrick's Day 2012, the Rawlins White Memorial Loyal Orange Lodge No. 803 was established. It is named after Rawlins White, a Protestant martyr who was burnt at the stake during the reign of Queen Mary I. The opening day saw 83 members gather to hold the first lodge meeting. They are associated with the Plymouth District. In 2017, they took part in The Twelfth in Northern Ireland.

== London ==
In London, there are several Orange walks that take place organised by the Grand Orange Lodge of England. They organise an annual Remembrance Sunday parade wreath-laying ceremonies at the Cenotaph on Whitehall, honoring British military personnel.

In May, the annual Loyal Orange Lodge District No. 63 City of London District march is held in Westminster. Approximately 300 Orangemen, alongside pipe and flute bands, march through central London. Bands have included Castlederg Young Loyalists and Pride of Govan.

A Lord Carson and Somme memorial parade takes place September in central London.

== Isle of Man ==
The Isle of Man District was overseen by the Grand Orange Lodge of England. Grand Lodge of the Loyal Orange Institution in Douglas was the Capital Grand Lodge. The Grand Orange Lodge held its annual meeting in Beaconsfield Hall. Female and Junior Lodges also existed on the island. Parades took place along the Douglas Promenade.

The De Bentley Lodge No. 1044, formed in 1850 and based in Douglas, is one of the earliest Orange Lodges on the island.

== Structure ==
=== Liverpool Provincial Grand Orange Lodge ===
- Duke of York District
- North District
- Enniskillen District
- St Paul's District
- Everton & Kirkdale District
- Lord Carson Memorial District
- Kirkby Royal Arch District
- Protestant Reformers Memorial District

=== Manchester Provincial Grand Orange Lodge ===
- Red Rose District
- Bootle District
- Manchester City District

=== Northern Provincial Grand Orange Lodge ===
- Alexander Marsh Memorial Yorkshire District
- Tyneside & North Yorkshire District

=== Metropolitan Provincial Grand Orange Lodge ===
- City of London District
- Plymouth District
- Portsmouth District
- Sussex & Kent District

=== Midlands Provincial Grand Orange Lodge ===
- West Midlands District
- East Midlands District

== Grand Black Chapter of England ==
The Grand Black Chapter of England oversees the operations of the Royal Black Institution across England and Wales. Members must be a member of the Orange Order and holding the Royal Arch Purple degree.

The institution made its way to England in 1845 and currently governs approximately 25 local preceptories organised across several districts, including Liverpool, Manchester, North West England, and the South of England. The English Grand Black Chapter has 5 Districts, there are the Liverpool District No. 1, Liverpool District No. 2, Manchester District No. 4, Liverpool North End and Bootle District No. 6 and South of England District No. 11. Each district oversees a number of Preceptories (similar to Orange Lodges).

The biggest annual parade hosted by the Grand Black Chapter of England, known as the Black Saturday demonstrations, takes place on the first Saturday in August. It typically takes place in Southport and Bootle.

English Preceptories often partake in the Royal Thirteenth parade in Scarva.

== Apprentice Boys of Derry ==
The English Amalgamated Committee, was chartered on 9 April 1988 at Orange Street Church in London. The committee represents all Apprentice Boys branches across England. Members participate in local parade demonstrations and church services commemorating the 1689 Siege of Derry, while regularly traveling to Northern Ireland to join the August (Relief of Derry) and either Derry or Glasgow in December (Shutting of the Gates) celebrations.

An annual parade is held in Southport town centre.

== See also ==
- Grand Orange Lodge of Ireland
- Grand Orange Lodge of Scotland
- Orange Order in Canada
- Orange Order in New Zealand
- Orange Order in Australia
- Orange Order in the United States
- Orange Order in Africa
- Orange Order in the Republic of Ireland
- List of Grand Orange Lodges
- Independent Loyal Orange Institution
- Royal Black Institution
- Apprentice Boys of Derry
- Orange Heritage Week
