= Orange Order in Africa =

Protestant fraternal organisation

- Flag of Orange Order used globally
- Abbreviation: GOLWA
- Predecessor: Grand Orange Lodge of West Africa
- Formation: 1900s (First lodge in Lagos)
- Founded: 1976
- Type: Accra, Ghana / Lomé, Togo
- Legal status: Fraternity
- Origins: Loughgall, County Armagh, Ireland
- Region served: Ghana and Togo
- Main organ: Trustees, Senior Officer Bearers
- Parent organization: Orange Institution
- Subsidiaries: Grand Orange Lodge of Ghana; Grand Orange Lodge of Togo
- Affiliations: Imperial Orange Council

The Orange Order first spread to Africa in the late 19th and early 20th centuries through British and Irish settlers, soldiers, and missionaries. In 1976, the Grand Orange Lodge of West Africa was established but would split in 1985 so that governing bodies in Ghana and Togo could focus on their own nation. These bodies are known respectively as the Grand Orange Lodge of Ghana and the Grand Orange Lodge of Togo. Both are formally recognized by the Grand Orange Lodge of Ireland. They partake in the triennial Imperial Orange Council meetings.

Over time, they have become primarily led by locals, which has integrated West African cultural and religious contexts while maintaining historic links with the Irish and British Orange jurisdictions. Orange processions and church services are held annually to commemorate Orange events such as The Twelfth of July.

In Africa, lodges focus more on Christianity and community rather than politics. Grand Orange Lodge of Togo Grand Master stated that politics are forbidden in the lodge.

== History ==
=== 1900s - 1950s ===
In the 1900s, the first Orange lodge in Africa was established in Lagos, Nigeria and was named Lagos Fine Blues, LOL No. 801. A woman's Orange lodge was also founded in Lagos.

By 1919, leadership in Nigeria had passed fully to Africans. the first Nigerian Grand Master, TA King, E. A. Ojo in 1919. In the 1920s, a lodge photo shown that all members were made up of African natives.

The first Orange lodge in Togo, Defenders of Lome (Loyal Orange Lodge No. 867), was founded on 3 September 1915 by John Amate Atayi, a Togolese member who had previously been active in the Order in Lagos, Nigeria.

In 1917, Ghanaian Cape Coast postal worker R. E. Sharlley learned about the Orange Order through a newspaper. He contacted the Grand Secretary in England, was referred to the Togo lodge, and after the war founded Ghana's first lodge, Pride of Keta, LOL 891 in 1918. That same year, a second lodge in Togo was formed, known as Palimé Heroes, located in Palimé, with Augustus G. de Souza as Worshipful Master and Clemence A. Lumor as Secretary.

The Atakpamé Orange Lodge kept its records in English, despite being under French mandate. In 1951, John Amate wrote a petition concerning French occupation of Togoland to the United Nations Trusteeship Council.

=== 1960s - 1990s ===
In 1977, a new Ladies Lodge was founded in Rue Aniko Palako, Lomé, named La Cite de Dieu (The City of God). The inauguration took place at the Rue Aniko Palako Presbyterian School Hall. A Thanksgiving service and parade was held to recognize the opening of the new lodges in Togo.

Having operated under the administrative authority of the Grand Orange Lodge of England since the early twentieth century, the African Lodges gained formal independence in 1976. The English Grand Lodge granted autonomy to its African lodges, establishing the Grand Orange Lodge of West Africa as an independent sovereign Grand Lodge.

In 1985, the Grand Orange Lodge of West Africa divided into separate national Grand Lodges for Ghana and Togo, officially granting autonomy to the Grand Orange Lodge of Ghana and Grand Orange Lodge of Togo.

By the 1990s, the Ghanaian Orange Lodge was led by Grand Master Cephas Yao Tay, holding monthly meetings in Accra.

Other senior figures included Fred Gregorio de Souza (former Grand Master), a retired army major as Grand Treasurer, and an accountant as Deputy Grand Master. Tay attended numerous 12 July parades in Ireland.

In 1994, Emmanuel Aboki Essien became the first African to serve as President of the Imperial Orange Council, the governing body of worldwide Orangeism.

During the same decade, the Ghanaian Orange Lodge proposed to the Imperial Orange Council proposed for a name change to “International Orange Council”, arguing that the term “Imperial” has too many connotations in Africa.

=== 2000s - Present ===
A revival of the Orange Order has been reported in parts of West Africa, particularly in Ghana and Togo. According to research by Dr Rachel Naylor of the University of Ulster, around twenty lodges were active in the region in 2005.

Ghanaian lodges are noted for their strong youth membership and for commemorating the Battle of the Boyne through church services and community parades.

While their rituals and regalia resemble those of lodges in Northern Ireland, Dr Naylor observed that African lodges focus on community and church services over politics.

In 2015, Dennis Tette Tay, acting Grand Master of the Orange Order in Ghana, stated that “Orangeism is in his soul.” When talking about sectarianism, Grand Master Tay stated that the lodge has “no problem with Catholics” and focuses on faith, fraternity, and community values rather than Northern Irish political divisions.

The Orange Standard newspaper features information about Orange walks in West Africa, showing their growth in recent history. History of the Orange Order in Africa is displayed in the Museum of Orange Heritage.

== Grand Black Chapter of West Africa ==
Alongside the primary Orange Order, the senior degree system of the Royal Black Institution has a presence in Africa. The Grand Black Chapter of West Africa, oversees two active Royal Black Preceptories Togo and Ghana.

== See also ==
- List of Grand Orange Lodges
- Orange Order in Canada
- Orange Order in the United States
- Orange Order in Scotland
- Orange Order in Australia
- Orange Order in New Zealand
- Orange Order in England and Wales
- Orange walk
- Orange Heritage Week
- Ulster Covenant
- Apprentice Boys of Derry
