= Orange Order in the United States =

Protestant fraternal organization in the United States

Grand Orange Lodge of the United States
- Abbreviation: GOLUSA
- Nickname: Loyal orange Institution USA
- Formation: 1870
- Founder: John H. Bond
- Founded at: Manhattan, New York City, New York, US
- Legal status: Fraternity
- Headquarters: 1315 Biggs Road, Oak Hill, Wilmington, Delaware
- Origins: Loughgall, County Armagh, Ireland
- Region served: United States
- Main organ: Trustees, Senior Officer Bearers
- Publication: The Orangeman
- Parent organization: Orange Institution
- Website: orangeorderusa.org

The Orange Order in the United States, also known as the Loyal Orange Institution of the United States of America, is a Protestant fraternal organization and the American branch of the Orange Order. Ulster Protestant and Irish Protestant immigrants established the organization on the principles of promoting civil and religious liberty and persrving Ulster-Scots and Orange heritage in the United States. The national governing body, the Supreme Grand Orange Lodge of the United States, was formally established in 1870.

The Orange Order faced a number of issues, including dealing with the Orange Riots and propaganda against the background of the fraternity. Despite early controversies, the Institution experienced significant growth during the late 19th and early 20th centuries. It established thousands of local lodges across major industrial and mining states, including as Pennsylvania, New York, Ohio, Illinois, and Massachusetts, where it provided a sense of community, a place for holding meetings and as a political lobbying group. United States Orange representatives travel triennially to partake in the Imperial Orange Council meetings.

Grand Black Chapter of the United States of America is an organisation similar to the Orange Order. Once a member progresses through the Orange Order, they can join the Royal Black Institution. It exclusively follows the Reformed faith and the Bible.

The Orangeman is the active national newsletter for the Loyal Orange Institution USA.

== History ==
=== Origins ===
Protestant migration to the United States occurred in distinct waves shaped by religious and political shifts within Ulster and the British Empire. Following the initial large-scale settlement of Ulster Scots in the American colonies during the 18th century, significant migration continued into the post-colonial and post-Famine eras.

While early pioneers sought religious freedom and relief from high land rents, 19th-century migrants were increasingly driven by the rapid globalization of the Atlantic slave trade. For many Ulster Protestants, moving to the United States was less a flight from demographic crises and more a calculated economic choice, boosted by the country being English-speaking, work available for skilled industrial workers and family connection from across the water.

Nineteenth-century church records, particularly those of Presbyterian ministers, track clear geographic patterns of Irish Protestant settlement in America, as clergy naturally migrated to areas with established potential congregants.

=== Formal Autonomy and Grand Lodge Chartering ===
The first Orange parade took place in 1824, in Boston, Massachusetts.

The movement began informally through early immigration waves but accelerated dramatically following the chartering of the first official American lodge in New York City in 1867.

Following the initial expansion of local lodges, the leadership of the United States movement petitioned the Grand Orange Lodge of Ireland in 1869 to grant them formal autonomy and National Grand Lodge status. In January 1870, John H. Nunn, the Grand Secretary of the Grand Lodge of Ireland in Dublin, issued an official certificate signed by the Irish Grand Master, the Earl of Enniskillen.

The document declared that the Irish parent institution held no objection or impediment to the formal establishment of a completely sovereign and independent association of Orangemen within the United States.

On May 4, 1870, John H. Bond, the first Grand Master of the Loyal Orange Institution of the United States of America, formally acknowledged receipt of the warrant and returned correspondence expressing gratitude to the Irish Grand Lodge. This official transfer of authority paved the way for the formal convention later that year that established the Supreme Grand Orange Lodge of the United States.

Lamartine Hall, located on 290 Eighth Avenue, Manhattan, became the headquarters for the Grand Orange Lodge of the United States. The building was built in 1845, and was a four-story, federal-style red-brick building.

=== Orange Riots ===
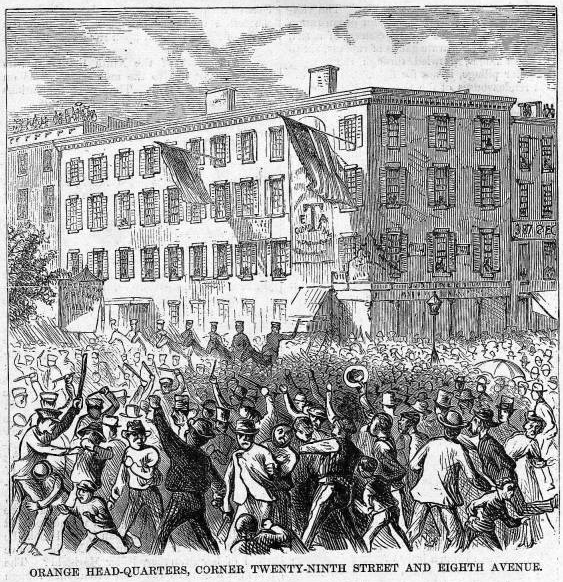
Lamartine Hall, the headquarters of the Grand Orange Lodge of the United States, during the Orange riot of July 12, 1871

The Order's early history in the United States was heavily shaped by sectarian tensions transplanted from Ireland, most notably culminating in the fatal Orange Riots of 1870 and 1871 in Manhattan, which pitted Irish Protestant paraders against Irish Catholic counter-protesters and local militia. Protestants celebrated the 12th of July through Manhattan, an annual tradition and the biggest Orange parade, as it seen Protestant King William defeat Catholic King James in the Battle of the Boyne. This changed the politics and direction in Ulster for the centuries that followed, in favor of Unionism .

As a result of the 1870 riot, Police Commissioner James J. Kelso initially banned the Orange parade from taking place again. However, Governor John T. Hoffman overturned the ban and ordered that the march be protected. The orders were instructed that around 1,500 New York City policemen and about 5,000 state militia and troops from the National Guard would be deployed to escort the Orangemen from Lamartine Hall.

The 1871 riot saw more than 60 civilians, mostly working-class Irish Catholics and Ulster Scots Protestants, and three Guardsmen dead. Among the more than 150 individuals wounded were 22 militiamen and roughly 20 police officers injured by flying debris and projectiles, alongside four law enforcement officers who survived gunshot wounds.

=== Expansion ===
William James Henry Traynor, United States Supreme Grand Master in the 1890s

By 1914, the Institution reached its historical peak, expanding to 364 lodges with over 30,000 active members.

An Orange Lodge was formed in Manchester, Connecticut by Northern Irish mill workers who immigrated to the area in the 1880s.

In the 1890s, leader of the anti-Catholic and national American Protective Association, W. J. H. Traynor served as the United States Supreme Grand Master

=== 21st century ===
Today, the Grand Orange Lodge of the United States is headquartered on Biggs Road, Oak Hill, Wilmington, Delaware.

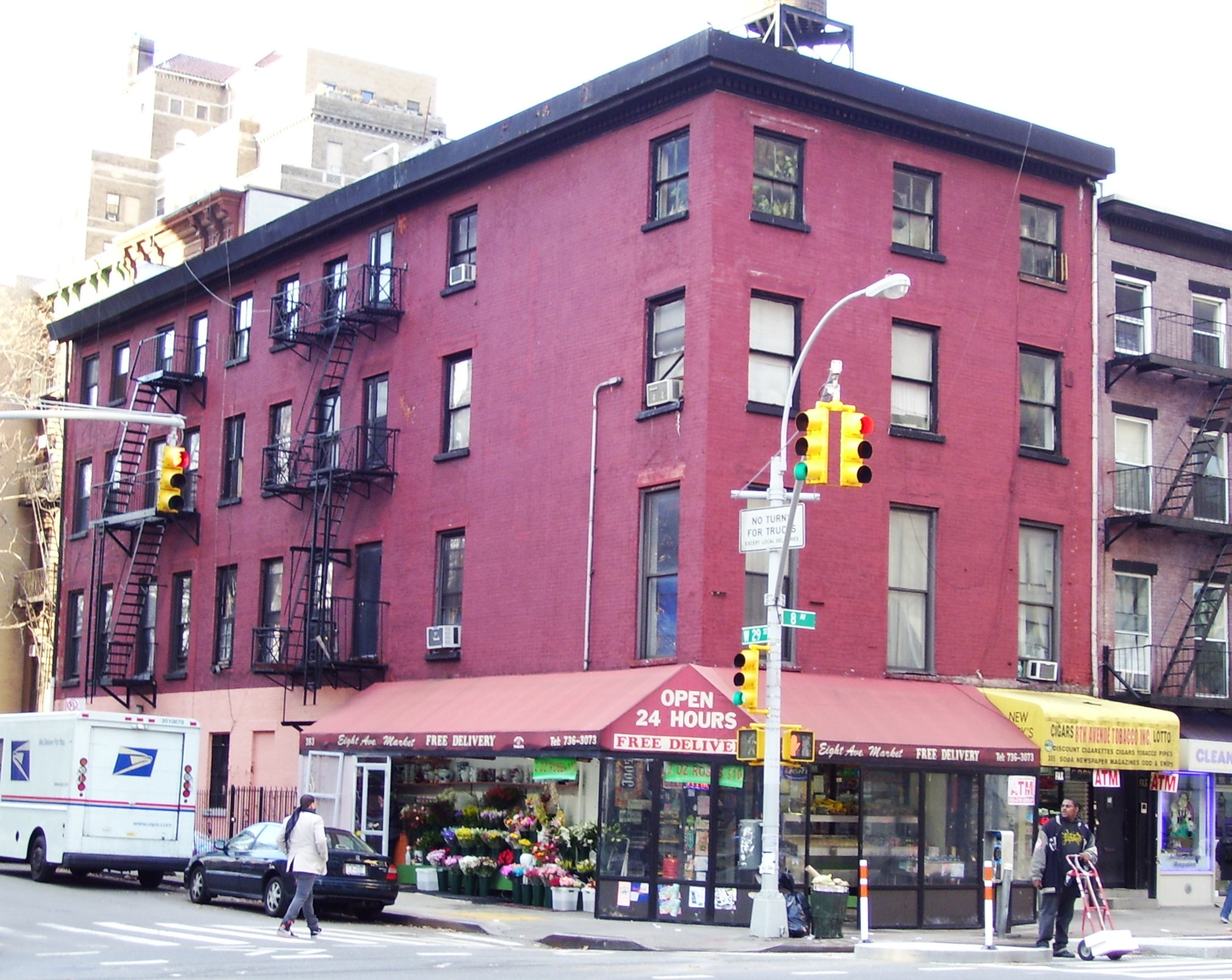
Lamartine Hall on Eighth Ave, Manhattan, New York City, once the location of the Supreme Grand Orange Lodge of the United States

In 2013, it was publicly revealed that William Greer, the Irish-born Secret Service agent who famously drove President John F. Kennedy's presidential limousine during his assassination in Dallas, had deep connections in the Orange Order. Before he emigrated from County Tyrone to the United States in 1929, Greer had been an active member and committee officer of the Drumbonaway Orange Lodge (LOL 698) in Stewartstown, being initiated into the lodge on July 7, 1927. His father, Richard Greer, was the treasurer of the lodge. Some conspiracy theorists later attempted to link Greer's Protestant, loyalist background to anti-Catholic motives surrounding the assassination of America's first Catholic president, these claims have been widely dismissed by historians and Greer's own family, who noted that he maintained close lifelong friendships with Catholic peers and harbored no sectarian sentiments.

In 2015, the Orange Foundation offered Scholarships through he Harold R. Alexander Memorial Orange Foundation Scholarship for college and university students.

In the modern era, membership in the Orange Order in the United States is not at the levels of its historical peak, mirroring broader trends in American fraternal organizations. Today, the Institution functions primarily as a historical, cultural, heritage focused and charitable fraternity. There are active lodges predominantly located in the Northeast and Mid-Atlantic regions, most notably within the state of Pennsylvania.

Ladies’ Auxiliary of the Grand Orange Lodge of the United States functions as a female branch of the Loyal Orange Institution in the United States.

== Orange Lodges ==
=== California ===
- California True Blues L.O.L. 118
- Ulster-Scots L.O.L. 1690

=== Connecticut ===
- Washington L.O.L., based in Washington, Connecticut

=== Delaware ===
- Grand Orange Lodge of the United States (National governing body)
- Jenkintown True Blue L.O.L.

The Grand Orange Lodge of the United States, alongside the Jenkintown Blues, is located in Wilmington.

=== Florida ===
Heirs of Cromwell L.O.L. 1599, based in Naples, Florida.

=== Illinois ===
- State Grand Orange Lodge of Illinois
- Chicago Protestant Defenders L.O.L. 229

=== Kentucky ===
- Land of Goshen L.O.L. 1517

=== Massachusetts ===
- State Grand Orange Lodge of Massachusetts
- Bunker Hill L.O.L

Bunker Hill Orange Lodge refers to the Battle of Bunker Hill, fought in 1775. The hall is in Somerville, near Boston.

=== Michigan ===
- Thomas A. Plunkett Boyne Defenders L.O.L.

This commemorates the influential past Supreme Grand Master of the U.S. Grand Lodge Thomas Plunkett. "Boyne Defenders" refers to the Battle of the Boyne, similarly named to the likes of Ballyvea Boyne Defenders, an Orange Lodge in Kilkeel.

=== Missouri ===
- State Grand Orange Lodge of Missouri
- St. Andrew's Cross L.O.L. 1638, based in Springfield, Missouri

=== Nevada ===
- Las Vegas Purple Star L.O.L 212

=== New Jersey ===
- State Grand Orange Lodge of New Jersey

=== New York ===
- New York State Grand Orange Lodge L.O.L. (State governing body)
- United L.O.L. 288

=== Ohio ===
- Gideon’s Trust L.O.L.

In Ohio, the Northeast Ohio Orange Order is an appeal for Protestants and Ulster-Scots to join the Orange Institution.

=== Pennsylvania ===
- State Grand Orange Lodge of Pennsylvania
- Northside True Blues L.O.L.
- Washington L.O.L.
- Jenkintown True Blue L.O.L.

=== South Carolina ===
- President Rutledge L.O.L. 1776

This honours John Rutledge, a signer of the U.S. Constitution and the first Governor of South Carolina.

=== Tennessee ===
- Volunteer L.O.L. 9

=== Virginia ===
- Patrick Henry L.O.L. 1105

The Virginia Lodge commemorates Patrick Henry, Founding Father famed for his "Give me liberty, or give me death!" speech—an ethos that strongly resonated with the Order's stated dedication to civil and religious liberties.

== Grand Black Chapter of the United States of America ==
The Grand Black Chapter of the United States of America operates as a senior, appendant branch of the American Orange Order. While the primary Orange lodges follow the heritage, fraternity and cultural themes, the Royal Black Institution is strictly religious, focusing on the Holy Scripture and closer connection with God.

Membership in the institution is exclusive, as an applicant cannot join a local Preceptory without first being an active, third-degree member in good standing of a Loyal Orange Lodge and having attained the foundational Royal Arch Purple Degree.

=== Diminishment and resurgence ===
While historically maintaining dozens of local chapters across the American industrial belt during the late 19th and early 20th centuries, the modern organization went through a major structural consolidation. The Grand Black Chapter of the United States was officially reformed in 2014 to revitalize the order.

In 2022, five top officers, including Sovereign Grand Master Rev William Anderson, travelled to partake in a series of meetings and workshops of the Grand Black Chapter of the United States of America. The growth since 2014 had seen growth in the Institution, including members with no connection to Northern Ireland.

In 2023, the American branch achieved a significant international milestone when it hosted the parent organization's annual conference in Virginia Beach, Virginia, marking the first time in the history of the Imperial Grand Black Chapter that the international gathering was held outside of the British Isles.

=== Active American Black Chapters ===
- Old Dominion RBP 1607 (Virginia)
- McKinley RBP 1690 (California)
- Carolina RBP 1670 (South Carolina)
- Sons of Liberty RBP 1776 (Pennsylvania)

== See also ==
- List of Grand Orange Lodges
- Orange Order in Africa
- Grand Orange Lodge of Ireland
- Orange Order in Scotland
- Orange Order in England and Wales
- Orange Order in the Republic of Ireland
- Orange Order in Canada
- Orange Order in Australia
- Orange Order in New Zealand
- Apprentice Boys of Derry
- Orange Heritage Week
- Ulster Covenant
