= Orange Order in New Zealand =

Protestant fraternity in New Zealand

Grand Orange Lodge of New Zealand
- Abbreviation: GOLNZ
- Formation: 1908
- Legal status: Religious brotherhood
- Headquarters: Papatoetoe South, Auckland 1701, New Zealand
- Location(s): North Island Grand Orange Lodge; South Island Grand Orange Lodge
- Region served: New Zealand
- Main organ: Trustees, senior officer bearers
- Parent organisation: Orange Institution
- Website: www.orangeorder.org.nz

In the 1840s, the Orange Order was brought to New Zealand by Irish Protestant immigrants who carried overseas warrants issued by the Grand Lodge of Ireland. This led to Orange Lodges being established across the country. The Grand Orange Lodge of New Zealand was established in 1908. The Grand Orange Lodge of New Zealand is the governing body of the Orange Order in New Zealand, which governs and oversees the regional districts and Orange Lodges across the nation. Representatives from New Zealand travel triennially to partake in the Imperial Orange Council meetings.

The New Zealand Grand Orange Lodge is associated under the wider Orange Order, established in 1795 in Loughgall, County Armagh, following the Battle of the Diamond. The organisation focuses on preserving Orange heritage, the Reformed Faith, doing charitable work, loyalty to the sovereign and teachings of Holy Scripture.

In the mid-late 19th century, Orange Lodges grew rapidly in the North and South Islands. The Orange Order was an influential social and religious organisation among sections of New Zealand's Protestant community.

Although its membership has declined since the mid-twentieth century, the Order continues to operate lodges and participate in charitable, cultural, and commemorative activities.

== History ==
=== Origins ===
In the early 1840s, Ulster-Scots and Irish Protestant immigration to New Zealand brought with it Orange traditions. The earliest documented lodge meetings convened in Auckland in 1842 under District Warrant No. 1707. The warrant was brought by Irish immigrant and District Master of Newtownmountkennedy, James Carlton Hill from County Wicklow, Ireland.

In 1843, the first general meeting of the Orange Order in Auckland was held at the Osprey Inn.

On 26 December 1867, The Grand Orange Lodge of Ireland constituted The Grand Orange Lodge of the North Island.

In 1870, the first Orange Lodge was established on the South Island (then known as Middle Island). The Grand Orange Lodge of Ireland would go on to constitute the Grand Orange Lodge of the South Island that same year. Updated transport systems allowed Orangeism to spread across the South Island.

In 1877, the first Twelfth of July procession took place in Auckland. The Twelfth of July is the principal annual commemoration of the Orange Order. It commemorates the victory of King William III at the Battle of the Boyne in 1690. It became one of the Orange Order's most visible public events in New Zealand. Throughout the nineteenth and twentieth centuries, lodges organised parades, church services, speeches and community gatherings in various towns and cities.

In 1883, the Loyal Orange Grand Council of Australasia was formed as a network and supreme coordinating body for the Orange Order across Australia and New Zealand. Meetings would be held in various locations on rotation.

In September 1888, the first female Orange Lodge was established in Wellington in the Good Templars’ Hall on Manners Street.

In 1889 a further two female Orange Lodges were established in Christchurch under District 4. The Grand Orange Lodge would address women's affairs on a regular basis.

=== Controversy ===
==== Boxing Day riots ====
The Boxing Day riots refers to two Orange walks that led to an outbreak in sectarian riots in 1879. One took place in Christchurch, and the other in Timaru.

===== Battle of the Borough =====
In December 1879, leading up to the first Boxing Day Canterbury Orange march, a parade hosted by Irish Catholics was also advertised to take place that same day. The mayor advised the Orangemen to reroute the march prior to it taking place. A telegram was sent out to Christchurch for reinforcements.

Riots broke out at Christchurch, when Irish Catholic counter-protesters fought Orangemen during an Orange walk. Around 30 Catholics attacked a procession with pickaxe shafts. The riot became known as the “Battle of the Borough". Following this, the Supreme Court sentenced several of the attackers to prison.

===== Siege of Timaru =====
In Timaru on Boxing Day in 1879, Loyal Orange Lodge No 13 led an annual procession of friendly societies alongside Odd Fellows and the Foresters. Advertising for the event was met with immediate negative reactions from Catholics. An Irish Catholic inspector, Peter Pender learned of the march taking place days beforehand. The inspector, the mayor and the resident magistrate held a meeting in preparation. A strong police presence was ordered to the area from all over the Timaru District.

The Orangemen set off from Rechabites Hall in Russell Square to meet with the Foresters in George Street. A strategically placed detective observed around 80 Catholics leave Thomas O’Driscoll’s Hibernian Hotel on Latter Street, heading towards nearby George Street. Soon after, the crowd of Catholics grew to over 150 men and surrounded the Orangemen to attempt to cut the parade short. Efforts to hold the crowd back had no impact put the confrontation led to little violence. A couple of Orangemen drew their swords but were advised to put them away. The riot became known as the "Siege of Timaru" or the "Timaru Orange riots".

==== Charles Chiniquy ====
In 1880, former Roman Catholic priest and anti-Catholic lecturer Charles Chiniquy visited New Zealand, and received support from the New Zealand Grand Orange Lodge. Police were present at some events to maintain order amid controversy surrounding his lectures. Following the withdrawal of support from a number of churches, Chiniquy's visit to New Zealand was curtailed.

=== Grand Master Prime Minister ===
William Ferguson Massey, served as the 19th prime minister of New Zealand from 1912 until his death in 1925, was from Limavady, County Londonderry, Massey immigrated to New Zealand, where he eventually became the founding leader of the Reform Party and the Grand Master of the North Island Grand Orange Lodge... A statue of William Massey was built in his hometown of Limavady and was unveiled in 2008. In May 2025, MLA Edwin Poots hosted a centenary event at Stormont remembering Massey.

=== 20th century ===
In 1904, Walter Henry Marple became the Grand Master of the Grand Orange Lodge of New Zealand.

In 1908, the Grand Orange Lodge of New Zealand was established. The North and South Island Grand Orange Lodges dissolved.

In 1921, L.O.L. NO. 21 ‘No Surrender’ Lodge members Dunedin sent a letter to James Craig stating that "being true and loyal subjects of his Majesty King George" they would stand firm and if necessary come forward to protect the British Throne. The letter was printed in the Belfast Newsletter.

In 1930, women's lodges no longer needed a male instructor to be present, and women could carry out their affairs independently.

In 1992, women could stand for election for a position in the Grand Orange Lodge Office. The first female Grand Lodge Officer was elected.

In 1994, New Zealand was the first country under the Orange Order in the Southern Hemisphere to host the world governing body the Imperial Orange Council when members met in Auckland in 1994.

=== 21st century ===
In 2000, the Grand Orange Lodge elected its first female Grand Master, Most Worshipful Sister Patricia Ellis from Christchurch.

In 2008, the centenary of the official Grand Orange Lodge of New Zealand took place in Wellington.

In 2009, the Grand Orange Lodge of New Zealand travelled to the Republic of Ireland to participate in the The Twelfth parade in County Donegal.

== Orange Lodges ==
=== North Island Lodges ===
- Grand Orange Lodge of New Zealand (Grand Lodge)
- Belmont Albion Loyal Orange Lodge No. 45
- Hiram Loyal Orange Lodge No. 46
- Manawatu Kilwinning Loyal Orange Lodge No. 47
- Harvey Loyal Orange Lodge No. 49
- Te Aroha Loyal Orange Lodge No. 52
- St Mark’s Greytown Loyal Orange Lodge No. 53
- Ponsonby Loyal Orange Lodge No. 54
- Wairoa Loyal Orange Lodge No. 55
- Papakura Loyal Orange Lodge No. 56
- Auckland Loyal Orange Lodge No. 57
- Franklin Loyal Orange Lodge No. 58
- Advance Loyal Orange Lodge No. 61
- Ulster Loyal Orange Lodge No. 62
- Kuranga Loyal Orange Lodge No. 65
- Rawhiti Loyal Orange Lodge No. 66
- Otaki Loyal Orange Lodge No. 72
- Heretaunga Loyal Orange Lodge No. 73
- Abercorn-Tuahine Loyal Orange Lodge No. 76
- Ruahine Loyal Orange Lodge No. 80
- Alpha Loyal Orange Lodge No. 81
- Eketahuna Loyal Orange Lodge No. 92
- United Waiuku Loyal Orange Lodge No. 90

=== South Island Lodges ===
- Methven Loyal Orange Lodge No. 51
- Mokureta Loyal Orange Lodge No. 63
- Fortitude Loyal Orange Lodge No. 64
- Ngapara Loyal Orange Lodge No. 68
- Abercorn-Tuahine Loyal Orange Lodge No. 76
- Aparima Loyal Orange Lodge No. 77
- Mangonui Loyal Orange Lodge No. 78
- St Andrew’s Kilwinning Loyal Orange Lodge No. 79
- Oamaru Kilwinning Loyal Orange Lodge No. 82
- St Thomas Kilwinning Loyal Orange Lodge No. 83
- St John’s Loyal Orange Lodge No. 84
- Lake Lodge of Ophir Loyal Orange Lodge No. 85
- Arrow Kilwinning Loyal Orange Lodge No. 86
- Aorangi-Mokihinui Loyal Orange Lodge No. 89
- Christchurch Loyal Orange Lodge No. 91
- Mackenzie Loyal Orange Lodge No. 93

== Provincial Grand Black Chapter of New Zealand ==
The Royal Black Institution, also a Protestant fraternity, closely related to the Orange Order, has preceptories in the South Island of New Zealand. There are a total of eight preceptories that are governed by the Provincial Grand Black Chapter of New Zealand. They have a closer focus on Christian values, and one must progress through the Orange Order to join the institution.

In 1997, during his visit to Northern Ireland to partake in The Twelfth and Royal Thirteenth and sham fight in Scarva, New Zealand Grand Black Chapter Grand Master Rod Beil handed a cheque to Mr Gardiner, Royal Black Institution Grand Treasurer. The sum was for £5,000 in donations to the institution.

== See also ==
- List of Grand Orange Lodges
- Orange Order in Australia
- Grand Orange Lodge of Scotland
- Grand Orange Lodge of England
- Orange Order in the Republic of Ireland
- Orange Order in Canada
- Orange Order in the United States
- Orange Order in Africa
- Royal Arch Purple
- Apprentice Boys of Derry
- Orange Heritage Week
- Ulster Covenant
