= Orange Heritage Week =

Cultural and historical events in Northern Ireland

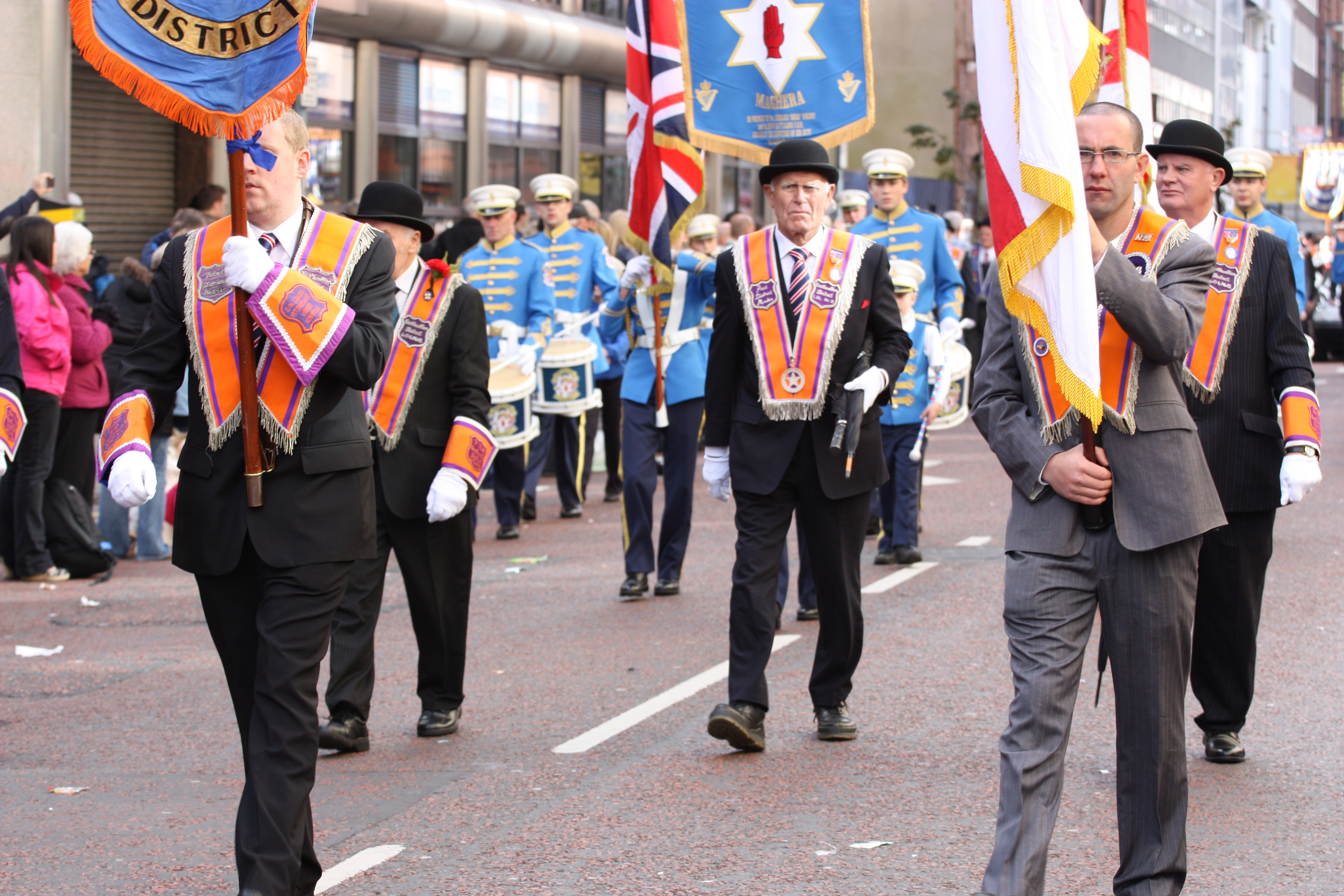
- Ulster Day Centenary Parade, 2012
- Nickname: Orange Week
- Status: Active
- Genre: Heritage
- Begins: 21 September
- Ends: 28 September
- Venue: Multiple
- Location: Various
- Country: Northern Ireland
- Inaugurated: 2017
- Founders: Orange Institution
- Major events: Lectures on Orange ballads and traditions, historical exhibitions, memorabilia, parades and open-house events
- Members: Orange Institution

Orange Heritage Week is an annual programme of cultural and historical events organised by the Orange Order and affiliated organisations to commemorate and promote the heritage and history of the Orange Institution, as well as the Protestant, unionist and Ulster-Scots traditions of Northern Ireland.

Orange Heritage Week features parades, religious services, exhibitions, historical lectures, guided tours, musical performances and other heritage activities across the country, including the service of Orangemen during the First World War. Events are organised in local towns, with bigger events taking place in Belfast.

The programme traditionally starts on 21 September, marking the anniversary of the Battle of the Diamond and the establishment of the Orange Order, known as Diamond Day. The week subsequently culminates on 28 September, known as Ulster Day, commemorating the signing of the Ulster Covenant in 1912, which opposed the introduction of Home Rule for Ireland. The Orange Heritage Week slogan is "From Diamond Day to Covenant Day".

Diamond Day and Ulster Day predate Orange Heritage Week, but these two key dates were used as a structure for the week of events.

== Events ==
A number of Orange parades take place across Northern Ireland.

The Museum of Orange Heritage at Schomberg House in Castlereagh organises tours and showcases rare artefacts. Late night openings took place to showcase the exhibition - '100 Years, 100 Images'.

One of the main events takes place at Dan Winter's House, in Loughgall, County Armagh, the location in which the decision was made to form the Orange Order. The event sees a three-day Orange Tree Festival, with musical performances and workshops.

Events take place in the Sloan's Inn Museum in Loughgall, the location where the Orange Order was established.

Orange-themed tours in Belfast City Cemetery.

A range of activities at Limavady Orange Heritage Centre.

Special events at the Museum of Orange Heritage in Loughgall, County Armagh.

Exhibitions feature the legacy of Martin Luther and the Protestant Reformation.

Hymns and musical performances at the Assembly Buildings, Belfast City Centre.

Lambeg drumming matches take place in County Antrim.

A number of Orange Halls open their doors to the public to host workshops and tours. Many halls contain unique banners, paintings, memorabilia and artifacts.

== History ==
Orange Heritage Week launched in September 2017 by the Grand Orange Lodge of Ireland.

In 2020, the fourth annual Orange Heritage Week was mostly moved to online events due to the COVID-19 pandemic lockdown restrictions. Information included audio and video presentations, as well as images of artefacts.

In 2021, the fifth annual Orange Heritage Week was formally recognised in the British House of Commons through Early Day Motion 478, which highlighted the history of the Orange Institution, its role during the Home Rule crisis and the service of Orangemen during the First World War. 2021 Orange Heritage Week contained limitations due to COVID-19.

In 2024, a document signed by King William III of England went on display at the Museum of Orange Heritage for Orange Heritage Week.

== Diamond Day ==
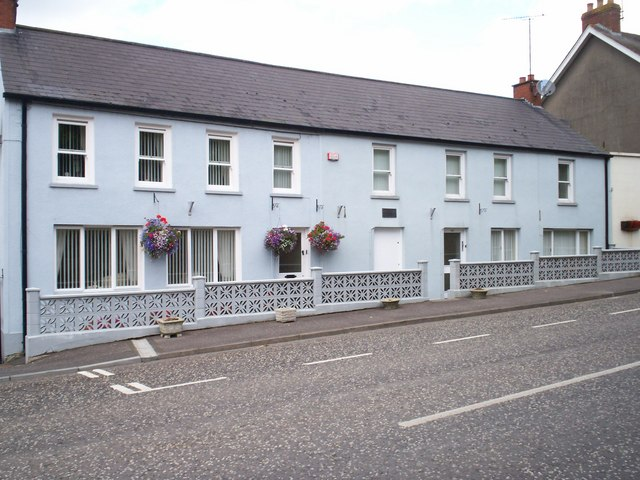
Sloan's Inn Museum

Diamond Day marks the beginning of Orange Heritage Week and marks the anniversary of the Battle of the Diamond and establishment of the Orange Order. The event takes place in Sloan's Inn Museum, the location where the Orange Order was established.

== Ulster Day ==
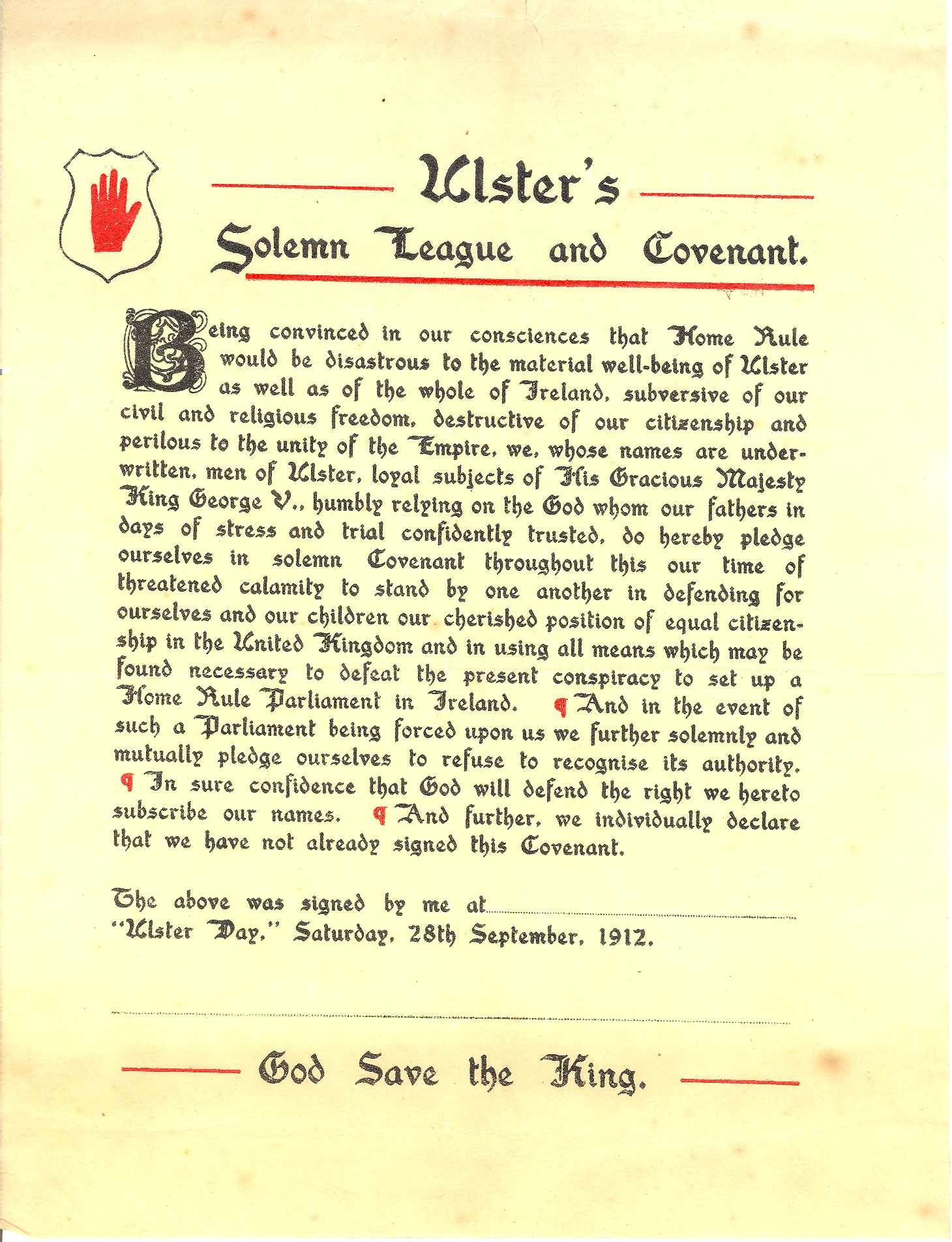
Ulster Covenant, 1912

Ulster Day, also known as Covenant Day and sometimes referred to as the Ulster Covenant Festival, is a commemorative day associated with the signing of the Ulster Covenant and the Ulster Women's Declaration on 28 September 1912. The day marked the culmination of the Ulster Unionist campaign against the Third Home Rule Bill, which proposed the establishment of an Irish parliament in Dublin while retaining Ireland within the United Kingdom.

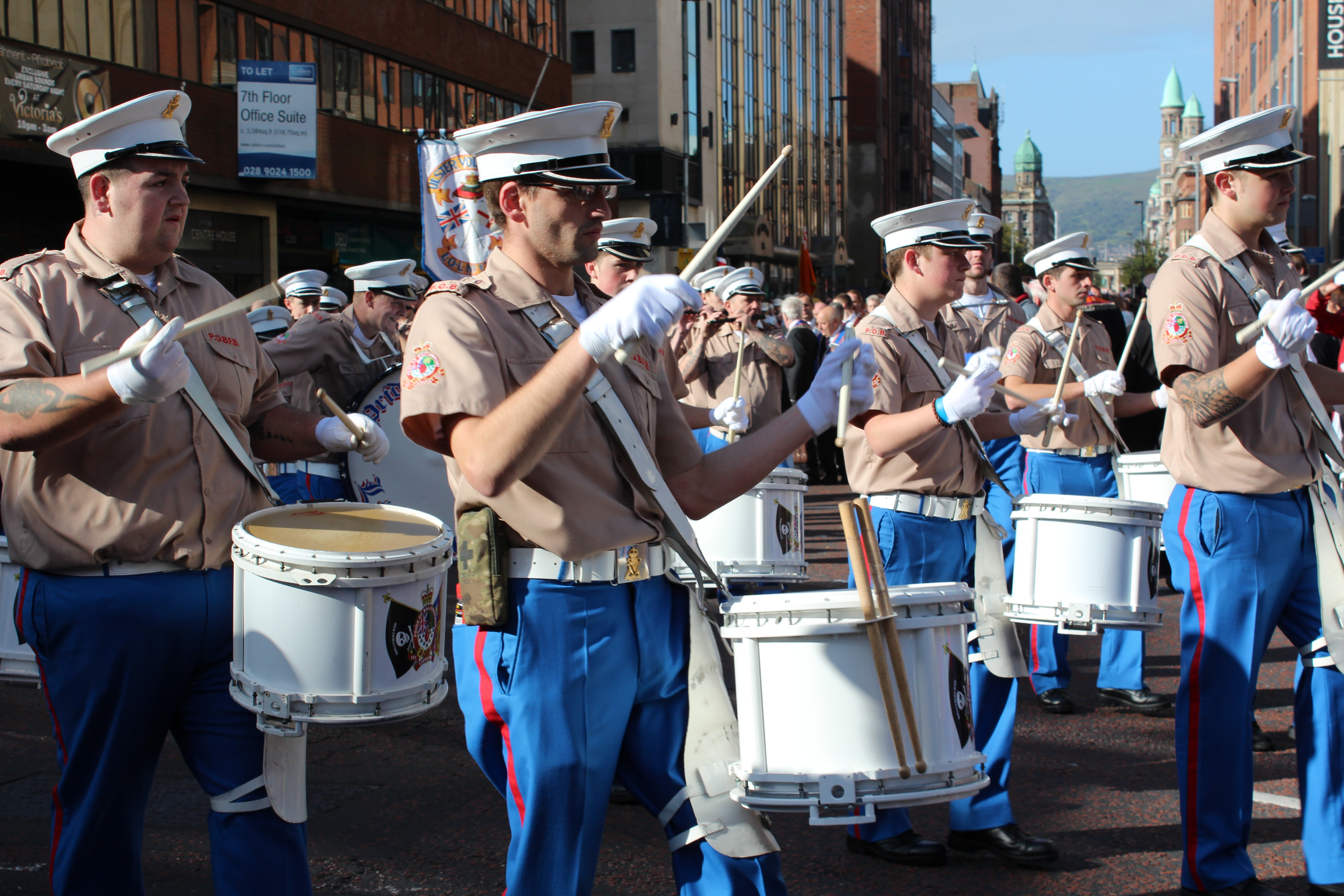
Pride of Ballymacash Flute Band marching on Ulster Day

The original Ulster Day took place on Saturday, 28 September 1912, when 237,368 men signed Ulster's Solemn League and Covenant and 234,046 women signed the accompanying Women's Declaration. The combined total of 471,414 signatures made the mobilisation one of the largest demonstrations of political opposition in Ireland before the First World War. Signatures were collected at more than 500 locations across Ulster and elsewhere in Ireland, Great Britain and other countries under the British Empire as long as they were born in Ulster.

The anniversary became an important date for celebration by Ulster unionism and Orangeism. A number of parades are held in Belfast, Newry, Ballymena and Carrickfergus. The Apprentice Boys of Derry host the Ballymena parade on Ulster Day, in which they create a reenactment of signing the Ulster Covenant.

A centenary parade was held on Ulster Day in 2012, a six-mile march with thousands in attendance. A concert was also held at Ulster Hall to mark the anniversary.

In August 2026, the High Court quashed the Parades Commission's decision to prevent the Orange Order's annual Drumcree parade from returning, ruling that the commission had failed to follow its own rules and procedures properly when making the decision. Following the ruling, the Orange Order announced that it would submit an application to parade at Drumcree. Portadown District Master Nigel Dawson said he intended to apply to hold an Ulster Day parade in the area. On 25 September, the Parades Commission gave the go ahead for the Portadown District to march down Garvaghy Road for Ulster Day. However, protesters blocked the Garvaghy Road, which led to an ongoing dispute between the Garvaghy Road residents and Orangemen.

== See also ==
- Imperial Orange Council
- Royal Arch Purple
- List of Grand Orange Lodges
- Parades in Northern Ireland
- Banners in Northern Ireland
- Apprentice Boys of Derry
- Independent Loyal Orange Institution
- Shutting of the Gates
