= Banners in Northern Ireland =

Banners are a significant part of the Culture of Northern Ireland, particularly for the Protestant/unionist community, and one of the region's most prominent types of folk art. They are typically carried in parades such as those held on the Twelfth of July, Saint Patrick's Day and other times throughout the year. Generally these are organised by societies such as the Orange Order, the Ancient Order of Hibernians, the Royal Black Institution and the Apprentice Boys of Derry, and the banners are typically commissioned by, and represent, a lodge within one of these societies. Banners are also carried by trade unions and church groups, and by marching bands. Most banners are painted by professionals and executed on silk, although canvas was a more popular material in the past. Most have a painting on each side, usually depicting different subjects, and the name and number of the lodge. Most banners have one subject per side, surrounded by flourishes, scrolls, and other decoration. Despite being in many ways a sectarian art form, Catholic and Protestant banners are usually very similar in terms of style and composition. Apart from subject matter, the main difference is colour: Orange Order banners make heavy use of the colour orange and to a lesser extent red, white, blue and purple, while Catholic banners tend to feature a lot of green.

The operational name of the British Army campaign in Northern Ireland during the Troubles was Operation Banner.

== Loyal Orange Institution ==
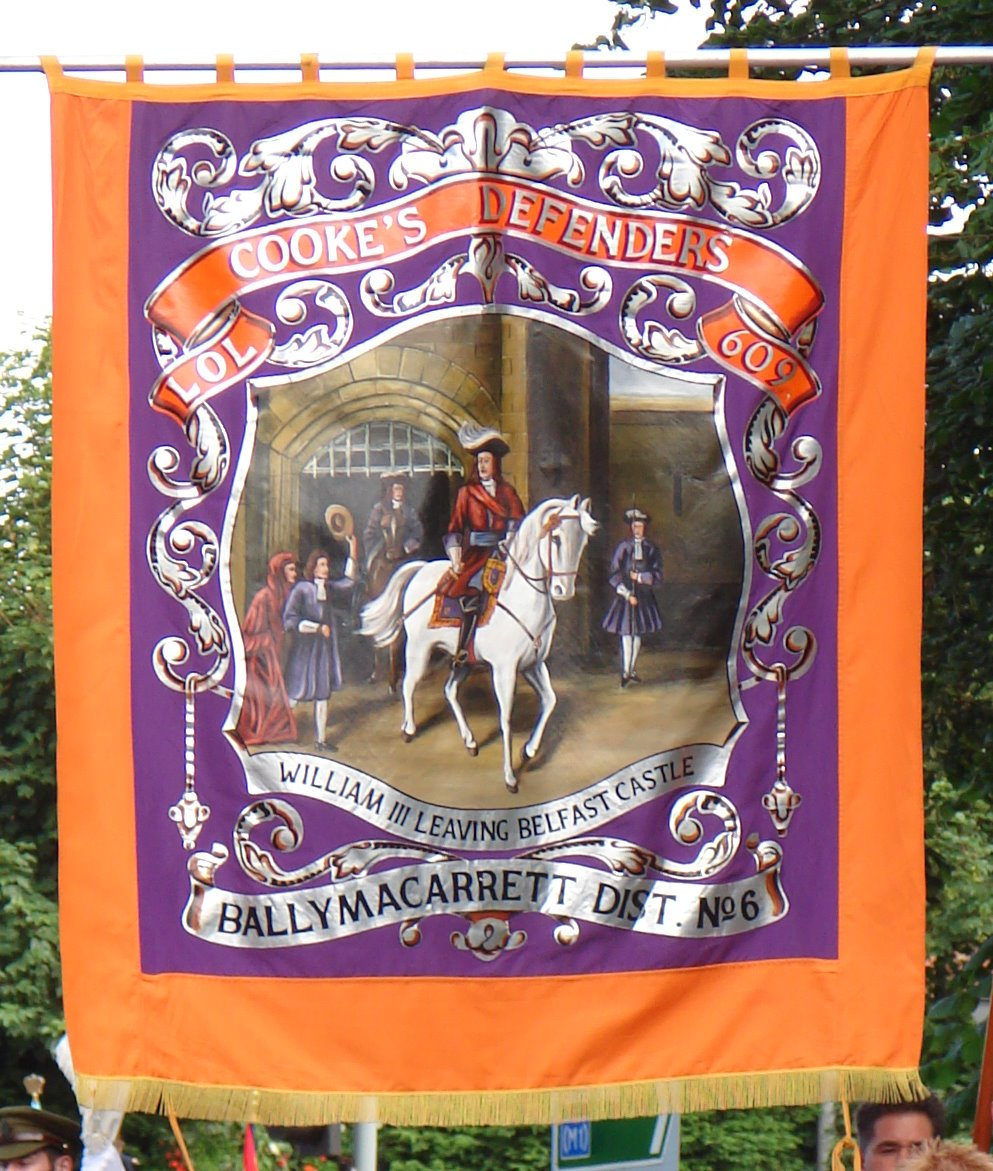
A non-standard depiction of King William III.

The banners of the Institution (better known as the Orange Order) depict a range of subjects, which can best be grouped into: historical, religious, memorial, local, and British. Some banners fit into more than one category.

=== Historical ===
By far the most common subject of Orange banner art is William III of England, whose victory in the Battle of the Boyne is celebrated on the Twelfth of July, the biggest Orange celebration. William is shown on at least one side of most Orange banners, usually crossing the Boyne River but sometimes in battle, arriving in England or Ireland, or in Belfast, or in head and shoulders portrait form. On Junior Orange Lodge banners he is sometimes shown as a child. Banner paintings of William crossing the Boyne are often based directly or indirectly on a painting by Benjamin West.

Other scenes from the Williamite War and Glorious Revolution may also be depicted. These include the Siege of Derry, particularly the shutting of the gates and the relief of the city, or portraits of Williamite commanders such as the Duke of Schomberg.

Some banners relate to the history of the Order. Subjects include Dan Winter's cottage, where the Order was founded, and William Johnston of Ballykilbeg, who in the nineteenth century defied a law against Orange marches. Others relate to the home rule crisis and depict scenes such as the signing of the Ulster Covenant or have portraits of Unionist leaders such as Edward Carson. Another popular period is World War I and in particular the Battle of the Somme in which many Ulster men lost their lives.

Miscellaneous historical topics depicted on Orange banners include World War II, the B Specials and Oliver Cromwell.

A typical Crown and Bible banner.

=== Religious ===
Religious topics are much less common on Orange banners than those of many other societies. The most common religious banner type, and the second most common type overall, is the Crown and Bible. This expresses the commitment of the Order to the British monarch with the strict condition that the monarch is Protestant, or more exactly, not Catholic. Under British law the monarch cannot be Catholic; this is the result of the 'Glorious Revolution' in which William III took over the Crown from the Catholic James II. Orangemen tend to see their patriotism and their commitment to Protestantism as inextricably interlinked.

Biblical stories are sometimes depicted on Orange banners, as is a figure clinging to a large cross, often on a tiny island in a raging sea. Some historical banners are also religious, and depict Protestant martyrs such as the Scottish Solway Firth martyrs or key figures in the Reformation such as Martin Luther and John Calvin.

=== Memorial ===
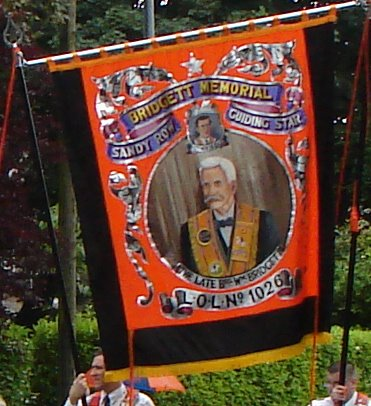
A memorial banner depicting a deceased lodge member.

Banners are sometimes used to commemorate deceased lodge members, often men who were little known outside lodge circles, and particularly those killed in the 'Troubles'. If a member was particularly well regarded the name of the lodge may be changed to commemorate them. The member will typically be shown in their marching gear; the banner thus provides a way for him to continue marching with his lodge.

A number of historical banners also act as memorials, for example to Carson, Queen Victoria, important figures in Orange or Ulster history, or figures from the Williamite War. Occasionally recently deceased non-members are depicted, such as Earl Mountbatten of Burma, who was killed by the Provisional Irish Republican Army in 1979. A number of banners depicting the Battle of the Somme act as memorials, especially those banners belonging to war memorial lodges. Others show war memorials in Northern Ireland or elsewhere.

The laws of the Order forbid the depiction of any living person other than the British monarch on lodge banners.

=== Local ===
An Orange Order banner dedicated to the Ulster Special Constabulary

A less common banner theme is the purely local subject, such as a map of Northern Ireland, a local landmark or scene from local industry, or a symbol of Northern Ireland, such as the Red Hand of Ulster. Landmarks depicted often have religious or historical connotations, for example a church or the site of a historical event. Industrial scenes often seem not to mean anything other than a connection with members of the lodge, although they may be symbolic of the Protestant work ethic. Ulster symbols such as flags are more commonly found on bannerettes or in the decoration around the main subject than as banner subjects in their own right.

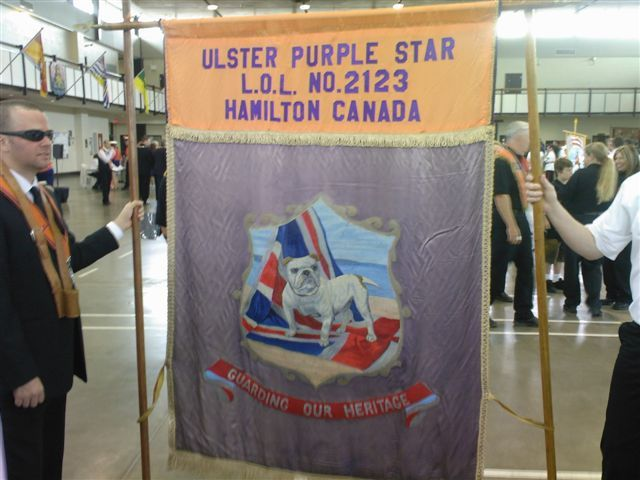
A Canadian lodge banner depicting a British bulldog with a Union Flag

=== British ===
A small number of banners show British or imperial subjects. The two most popular of these are probably Britannia (an allegorical figure representing Britain) and Queen Victoria handing a Bible to a non-white (usually Indian) prince or chieftain. The second scene is sometimes captioned 'the Secret of Britain's Greatness' or 'The Secret of Britain's Might' and the image is intended to convey that the might of the British Empire was based on its Protestant faith. British scenes are much less common now than in the past, due partly to the decline of the British Empire but mostly because of a widespread sense of betrayal over recent British government policies on Northern Ireland. However Union Flags are still commonly found in the decoration around the main subject, and crowns are a common motif.

== Royal Black Institution ==
Banner showing the Biblical story of the prophet Elijah being fed by ravens while in the wilderness.

The majority of the Institution's banners depict Biblical stories, although a significant minority show deceased members of the lodge, with the banner acting as a memorial. 'Craft' symbols with little meaning to those outside the Institution are occasionally the subject of Black banners, as are local landmarks, historical figures, and more accessible symbols such as the Crown and Cross. According to Anthony D. Buckley, the majority of Bible stories shown on Black banners are from the Old Testament and most have one or both of the following themes: a Godly person or people living amongst strangers or sinners, or in a foreign land; and the rewards of faithfulness. The stories act as an analogy for the history and position of Protestants in Ireland. New Testament themes such as loving one's enemies are rarely expressed. Bible stories shown on the banners include: Adam and Eve, Noah's Ark, Elijah, Ruth and Naomi, and scenes from the life of Jesus.

== Apprentice Boys of Derry ==
The Apprentice Boys organisation exists to remember the Siege of Derry, and consequently most of its banners show scenes from the Siege, or portraits of its heroes. However some of the topics shown on Orange banners also appear on Apprentice banners, particularly memorial portraits of deceased members.

== Ancient Order of Hibernians ==
The Ancient Order of Hibernians are a conservative Catholic and nationalist organisation. Most of their banners feature religious images of saints (especially Saint Patrick and the Virgin Mary) and popes (especially John Paul II, the first Pope to visit Ireland). Other banners feature symbols of Irish nationalism (such as Hibernia, Irish round towers and the Cláirseach) or historical advocates of constitutional nationalism (such as Daniel O'Connell).

== Irish National Foresters ==
The Irish National Foresters are a constitutional nationalist organisation open to Irish people of any denomination. Forester banners typically depict various Irish symbols and famous nationalists.

== Meaning ==
Banners do not exist merely to add colour to parades, but rather have several levels of meaning. At the most basic level, the topics show the allegiance of the person carrying them. A banner depicting Daniel O'Connell expresses a belief in Irish nationalism, while one of Queen Victoria or Edward Carson shows a desire to remain part of the United Kingdom. Likewise, banners of the Virgin Mary and Martin Luther signify Catholicism and Protestantism.

Many banners relate to the division in Northern Irish society between Protestants/Ulster Scots/Unionists/Loyalists on one side and Catholics/Irish/Nationalists and Republicans on the other. For example, William III's victory over James II in the Williamite wars led to two centuries of Protestant ascendency in Ireland; depictions of William, the Siege of Derry and so forth thus express the belief that this was a good thing. While many banners are ostensibly pro one group rather than anti the other, they are generally taken to mean – and often do mean – opposition to the other side. For example, a Bible on a Protestant banner is usually not simply an assertion that the Bible is a good thing, but also an attack on Catholicism, which is seen as overly dependent on priests and ignorant of the word of God.

Many banners are also allegorical. Several members of the Orange Order have argued that their historical banners are actually metaphors for religious principles. Former Grand Master W. Martin Smyth has said that the Siege of Derry can be seen as symbolising the eternal conflict between good and evil. In the same way that the apprentices of Derry shut the gates of the city against James' army despite the possible dire consequences, so righteous people should do God's bidding even if this is dangerous, and trust that God will save them. The relief of Derry is seen as symbolic of God's mercy and willingness to save all sinners if they trust in Him. Likewise, depictions of Britannia are not merely assertions of Britishness but also a statement that Britain was great because of its strong Protestantism, and has fallen in recent decades because of its godlessness.

== Similar banners in other countries ==
Banners of the type carried in Northern Irish parades were once much more common in other parts of the United Kingdom. In particular, trade union banners were very similar. Due perhaps to the decline of British heavy industry and the general fading of many working class traditions, such banners are commonly seen only at events such as the Durham Miner's Gala.

== See also ==
- Parades in Northern Ireland
