= Royal Arch Purple =

Organisation related to Orangeism

The Royal Arch Purple, properly the Grand Royal Arch Purple Chapter of Ireland, is an organisation related to Orangeism but not recognised by the Grand Orange Lodge of Ireland which recognises only two degrees, those of Orange and Plain Purple. It is a necessary prerequisite for entry into the Royal Black Institution.

== History ==
It was first used in 1795 shortly after the formation of the Orange Order and was the original system put together by the founding members of the Orange Order. The Grand Orange Lodge of Ireland disliked the ritualism and tried to suppress it as early as 1798 however, the main reason for the opposition to the Royal Arch Purple Degree was that many rural Lodges were practising other degrees in addition to the Royal Arch Purple degree and the gentry deemed this as unacceptable and realised the need for a central system of degrees. The Royal Arch Purple degree was practised in secrecy for a period after the Grand Lodge (in Dublin) deemed the degree illegal, however it was kept alive by the Lodges around County Armagh as it was the system of 'travel' closest to the original ritual put together by the founding members of the Orange Order in 1795. The Grand Lodge maintains their position in not recognising the degree to this day although it now, rather grudgingly, recognises the Royal Arch Purple as an official Order.

It was re-constituted in 1911, with the explicit intentions of promoting the Reformed Faith, Charity amongst all men and maintaining historic Orangeism. It was granted its Royal title by the Duke of Cumberland, King Ernest Augustus of Hanover, who was the fifth son of King George III, and brother to King George IV and King William IV, whom he succeeded as King of Hanover. As Duke of Cumberland Ernest Augustus had been Grand Master of the Orange Order in England until it dissolved itself at the request of the King William IV following a government inquiry into public disorder in Ireland caused by Orange marches.

== Name ==
The term "Arch" is derived from Greek ἀρχή (archē, 'authority') that is to say it means "chief". 'Purple' comes from one of the colours, mentioned in the Bible, which were used to make the curtains of the tabernacle (the others being Blue/Indigo and Scarlet). Some claim it is of Masonic origin; The "Diamond Boys" from North Armagh - Sloan, Winter and Wilson from the neighbouring Dyan in County Tyrone were all Freemasons. Wilson had asked his own Masonic lodge to give active help in repelling the Defenders (Ireland) and they refused, almost certainly saying that that would be against Masonic principles. As a result of that refusal and left without any alternative after the Battle of the Diamond the four men formed the Orange Order. They had no other template on which to base the proposed ritual and procedure but that of Freemasonry. That is why Orange ritual and most particularly Arch Purple ritual somewhat resembles that of Freemasonry. In fact it is so close that the Arch Purple can be considered to be a Protestant form of Freemasonry. although this has been repeatedly disputed, with overwhelming evidence proving the degree to be descended from the Orange Boys of the Dyan (prevalent around the early 1790s), which in turn based their degrees on the early Boyne Societies which dated from the late 17th century.

The Royal Arch Purple Degree itself is constructed along Christian lines, with Christian faith, hope and charity being commended to the new brother. To be a Royal Arch Purpleman, one must be a professing reformed Christian, sober and temperate, not prone to cursing or swearing, and a faithful attender in his Church. Marksman for example within the Royal Arch Purple refers to the Israelites who marked the location of the Ark of the Covenant. The Royal Arch Purple Degree is now established as a separate Order, in Ireland at least, and has over 30,000 members. The collarette of a Royal Arch Purpleman is a collarette of Orange and Purple in which the colour purple predominates.

The Royal Arch Purple Degree is now established as a separate Order and is widely practised as a natural step of advancement from the Orange Institution to the Royal Black Institution.

== See also ==
- Secret society
- Apprentice Boys of Derry
- Independent Loyal Orange Institution
