= Royal Black Institution =

Protestant fraternal organisation

The Imperial Grand Black Chapter of the British Commonwealth

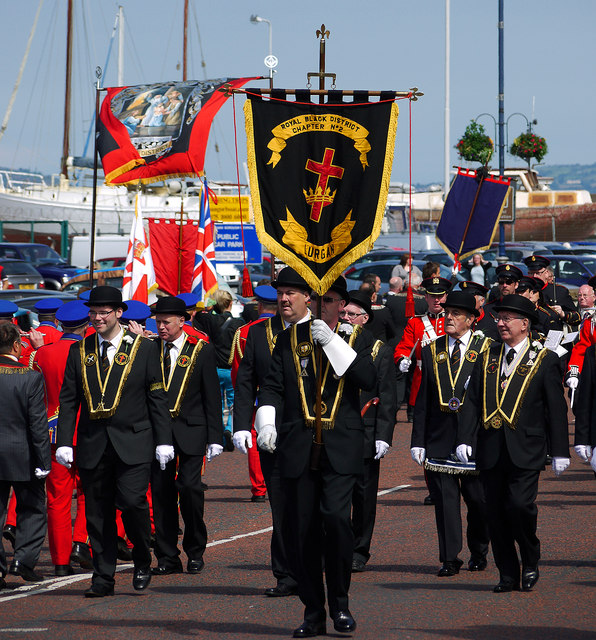
- Royal Black Institution parade, Bangor, County Down
- Nickname: "The Black"
- Formation: 1797; 229 years ago
- Headquarters: Loughall, County Armagh; Areas found: United Kingdom (based mainly in Northern Ireland and Scotland), Republic of Ireland (almost exclusively in County Donegal), United States, Canada, Australia, New Zealand other Commonwealth countries
- Official language: English
- Sovereign Grand Master: William Anderson
- Imperial Grand Registrar: Robert Dane
- Website: royalblack.org

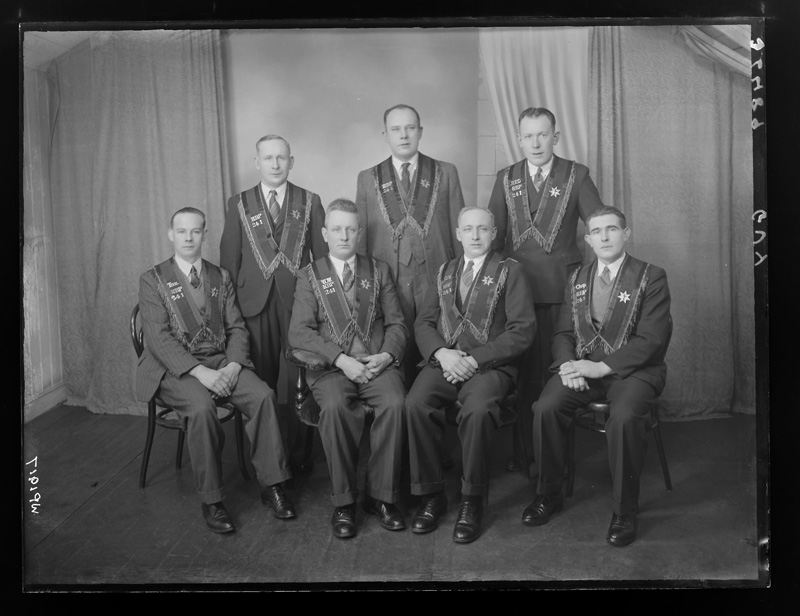
Members of the Royal Black Preceptory 241, photographed in 1948

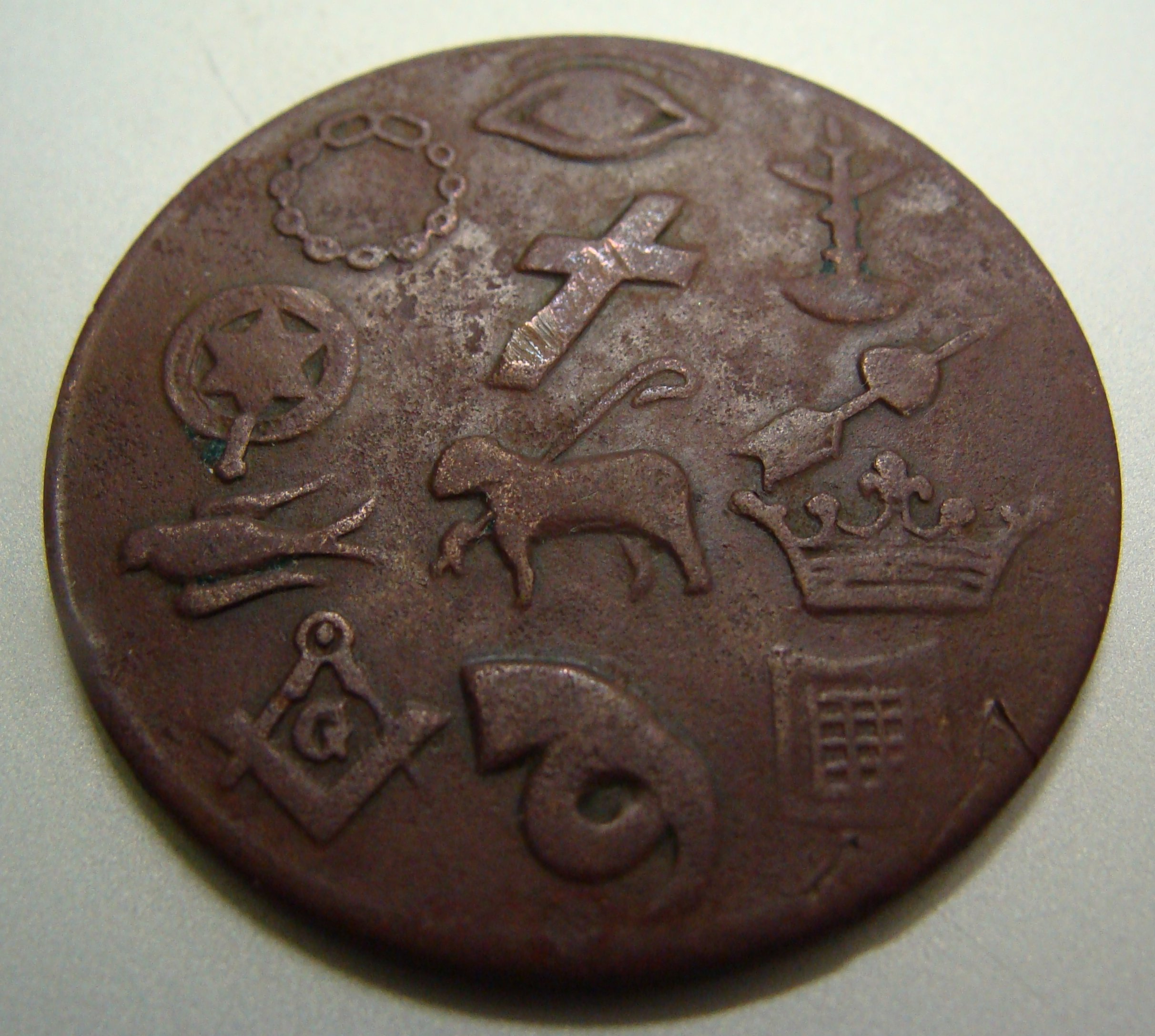
Token from a Canadian lodge of the RBI, with various symbols pertaining to the society

Symbol of the Institution, and logo — In Hoc Signo Vinces

The Imperial Grand Black Chapter of the British Commonwealth, or simply the Royal Black Institution, is a Protestant fraternal society.

In 2016, a theological working group set up by the Church of Ireland was informed by the organisation's leadership that it had a membership of around 17,000, of whom around 16,000 lived in the British Isles.

== History ==
The Royal Black Institution was formed in Ireland in 1797, two years after the formation of the Orange Order in Daniel Winter's cottage, Loughgall, County Armagh, Northern Ireland.

The society is formed from Orangemen, who hold the Royal Arch Purple Degree, and can be seen as a progression of those Orders, although they are three separate institutions. Anyone wishing to be admitted to the Royal Black Institution must first become a member of an Orange Order Lodge, and complete the Royal Arch Purple Degree. Members are expected to accept the doctrine of the Trinity and confess a personal faith in Christ.

The Royal Black is often referred to as "the senior of the loyal orders".

Members wear a sash or collarette of which the predominant colour is black.

The word "Royal" in the title is allegedly a reference to 1 Peter 2:9 ‘You are a chosen race, a royal priesthood, a holy nation, God's own people...’, not to politics or the British monarchy. The word "Black" allegedly refers to mortality, and is a symbol of mourning.

== Organisation and events ==
Its headquarters is in Loughgall, County Armagh. Members refer to each other as "Sir Knight", whereas in the Orange Order members are referred to as "Brother" or "Brethren".

The organisation is structured with the Imperial Grand Black Chapter as the presiding body, and which comprises representatives from County Chapters. Counties are sub-divided into districts, which are formed by groups of preceptories.

The RBI claim that their basis is the promotion of scripture and the principles of the Protestant Reformation. It has preceptories throughout the world, mainly in the major English-speaking countries, and is particularly strong in Newfoundland.

In 1931, on the day before a planned demonstration by members of the Royal Black Institution, crossing the border from Northern Ireland and into the then Irish Free State, the IRA occupied Cootehill in County Cavan, as a counter protest.

In Northern Ireland it holds an annual parade in the village of Scarva, County Down, on 13 July (the day after the Orange Order's 12 July celebrations). It is commonly referred to as "The Sham Fight" as it involves a mock fight between actors reenacting the Battle of the Boyne. The other major parade of the year is "Black Saturday", also known as "The Black Parade" and "Last Saturday", held on the last Saturday in August at several locations throughout Ulster (including a major parade in Raphoe in the Laggan district of East Donegal, Ireland).

The society is also popular in Scotland, where 60 preceptories exist organised into 11 districts across the country. Twenty-six marches by the Black Institution have taken place in Glasgow alone between 2009 and 2010.

== 2012 apology ==
The Royal Black Institution has adopted a more conciliatory attitude to contentious parades than the Orange Order, and is less overtly political, though not without political influence.

After loyalist bands defied a Parades Commission ruling on Black Saturday by playing music outside St Patrick's Catholic Church on Donegall Street, Belfast, the Royal Black Institution issued an apology to the clergy and parishioners of the church for any offence caused. The parish priest, Father Michael Sheehan, welcomed the apology and "the sincere Christian spirit behind it".

== Degrees ==
The society's members are assigned one of eleven degrees, as follows, in descending order:

1. Royal Black Degree
2. Royal Scarlet Degree
3. Royal Mark Degree
4. Apron and Royal Blue Degree
5. Royal White Degree
6. Royal Green Degree
7. Gold Degree
8. Star and Garter Degree
9. Crimson Arrow Degree
10. Link and Chain Degree
11. Red Cross Degree

The Institution also possesses a final retrospective overview degree, which is essentially an overview of the eleven.

== Sovereign Grand Masters ==
A chronological list of Sovereign Grand Masters of the Royal Black Preceptory:

- 1846: Thomas Irwin
- 1849: Morris Knox
- 1850: Thomas Johnston
- 1857: William Johnston
- 1902: H. W. Chambers
- 1914: William Henry Holmes Lyons
- 1924: Sir William James Allen
- 1948: Sir Norman Stronge, 8th Baronet
- 1971: Jim Molyneaux
- 1995: William J Logan
- 2008: Millar Farr
- 2018: William Anderson
