= Grand Orange Lodge of Scotland =

Organization

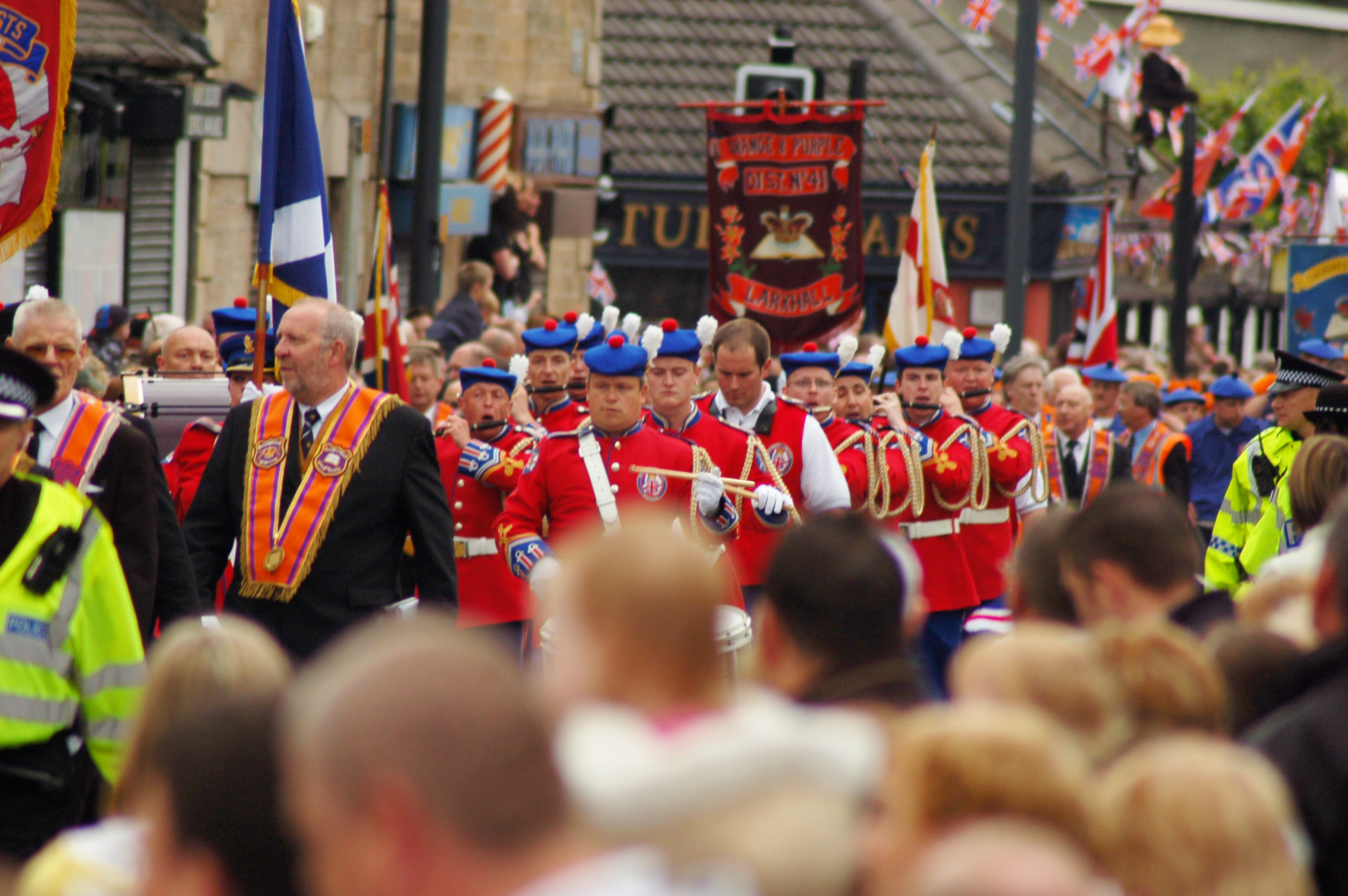
- An Orange march at Larkhall, South Lanarkshire, Scotland in 2008
- Formation: 1798
- Legal status: Religious brotherhood
- Headquarters: Olympia House, 13 Olympia Street, Bridgeton; Glasgow, Scotland; G40 3TA
- Coordinates: 55.849°N 4.227°W
- Region served: Scotland
- Members: 50,000 (2026)
- Main organ: Trustees, Senior Officer Bearers
- Parent organisation: Orange Institution
- Website: www.orangeorderscotland.com

The Grand Orange Lodge of Scotland, or Loyal Orange Institution of Scotland, Orange Order in Scotland, The Orange Order is the oldest and biggest Protestant fraternity in Scotland. The Loyal Orange Institution was an official participant in the 2014 independence referendum. Its headquarters are in Motherwell, having previously been in Bridgeton, Glasgow with 15,000 members in the Scottish Lowlands.

The Orange Order was formed in Ulster in 1795 by Ulster Protestants, many of whom had Scottish roots. It was brought to Scotland in 1798 by soldiers returning from service in Ulster, and its membership was soon swelled by large numbers of Ulster Protestant immigrants. As such, the Scottish branch has strong links with Northern Ireland and Ulster unionism/loyalism. During the Troubles, lodges were accused of having links with loyalist paramilitaries.

The Order is best known for its yearly marches, the biggest of which are held on and around 12 July ('The Twelfth').

== Origins ==
In the early 17th century, following the Nine Years' War, the Irish province of Ulster was colonised by Protestant settlers from Great Britain. Most of the colonists came from the Scottish Lowlands and Northern England. This scheme was sponsored by the British monarchy as a way of controlling the mainly Catholic and Gaelic province. There was another wave of Scottish migration to Ulster during the Scottish famine of the 1690s.

In the 'Glorious Revolution' of 1688, Catholic king James VII of Scotland and James II of England and Ireland was overthrown and replaced by the Dutch-born Protestant king William of Orange. This led to war in Ireland and rebellion in the Scottish Highlands. The mainly-Protestant armies of William (Williamites) defeated the mainly-Catholic armies of James (Jacobites).

The Orange Order was founded in Ulster in 1795 – during a period of Protestant-Catholic sectarian conflict – as a brotherhood sworn to defend the Protestant Ascendancy and the Protestant British monarchy. Its name is a tribute to William of Orange.

In 1798, Protestant British soldiers from Scotland were sent to Ireland to help suppress an Irish republican rebellion. These soldiers fought alongside Orange militiamen and, when they returned to Scotland, they founded Scotland's first Orange lodges. The Scottish Orange Order grew swiftly in the early 1800s, when there was an influx of working-class Ulster Protestant immigrants into the Scottish Lowlands. Many of these immigrants saw themselves as returning to the land of their forefathers.

There was also a wave of Irish Catholic immigration to the Lowlands in this period, especially during the Great Famine. To gain an upper hand in their new home, and to differentiate themselves from the Irish Catholics, Irish Protestants showed their loyalty to 'king and country' through the medium of the Orange Order.

The first Orange march in Scotland was held in Glasgow on 12 July (The Twelfth) 1821. It was accompanied by sectarian unrest between Protestants and Catholics.

Scottish Orange Order leaders forged informal alliances with "anti-Popery" Tories to oppose Catholic emancipation in 1829 and Parliamentary Reform in 1831.

== Structure ==
The Grand Orange Lodge of Scotland is made up of four County Grand Lodges: Ayrshire-Renfrewshire and Argyll, Central Scotland, East of Scotland and Glasgow. From these County Grand Lodges Orangemen and Orangewomen are elected to the organisation's governing body.

== Opposition to Scottish independence ==
The Orange Order has long been opposed to Scotland becoming independent from the United Kingdom.

In a July 2001 interview with the Sunday Herald, Jack Ramsay, the General Secretary of the Grand Orange Lodge of Scotland, warned that if Scotland became an independent country, the Orange Order might oppose it by becoming "a paramilitary force".

On 24 March 2007, about 12,000 Orangemen from Scotland and other parts of the UK marched in Edinburgh to celebrate the 300th anniversary of the Acts of Union 1707. This culminated in a rally where its leaders attacked the SNP and Scottish independence.

The Orange Order, after decades of decline in Scotland, made a short-lived recovery in its membership between 2006–09. In October 2009, the Orange Order again declared its strong opposition to the Scottish National Party and Scottish independence. Traditionally supportive of the Scottish Conservative Party, as well as the Scottish Unionist Party, which was founded by members of the Orange Order who opposed the Anglo-Irish Agreement, in 2009 the Orange Order in Scotland vowed to support unionism even if that meant turning their coats and assisting their political opponents in the Scottish Labour Party at elections.

In 2012, as a response to the upcoming 2014 Scottish independence referendum the Orange Order of Scotland set up its own group called British Together to campaign for a "No" vote, stating that; "It will come as no surprise to most that the Orange Order in Scotland is fervently opposed to the break-up of the United Kingdom. Ever since the first Orange lodges were constituted in Scotland in 1797, we have been committed to a United Kingdom, headed by a constitutional monarchy". In 2014 it then officially registered as a "permitted participant" in the Scottish referendum campaign. It held a major anti-independence rally in Edinburgh on 13 September 2014, five days before the referendum.

== Links with loyalist paramilitaries ==
There have long been links between the Orange Order in Scotland and Protestant Ulster loyalists in Northern Ireland. After the onset of the Troubles, many Scottish Orangemen began giving support to loyalist militant groups, such as the Ulster Defence Association (UDA) and Ulster Volunteer Force (UVF). These groups had cells in Scotland that were tasked with supplying funds and weapons. Although the Grand Lodge publicly denounced paramilitary groups, many Scottish Orangemen were convicted of involvement in loyalist paramilitary activity, and Orange meetings were used to raise funds for loyalist prisoners' welfare groups.

In the early years of The Troubles, the Order's Grand Secretary in Scotland, John Adam, toured Orange lodges for volunteers to "go to Ulster to fight". Thousands are believed to have volunteered, although only a small number travelled to Ulster. At The Twelfth in 1970, Scottish Grand Master Thomas Orr publicly declared that Scottish Orangemen would support Ulster loyalists "in every way possible".

In 1974, Orangeman and former soldier Roddy MacDonald became the UDA's 'commander' in Scotland. In 1976, senior Scottish Orangemen tried to expel him after he admitted on television that he was a UDA leader and had smuggled weapons to Northern Ireland. However, his expulsion was blocked by 300 Orangemen at a special disciplinary hearing. Following this, the Scottish Grand Lodge issued a resolution condemning all militant groups who "seek to usurp the law". In 1979, MacDonald was sentenced to eight years in prison. His successor as Scottish UDA commander, James Hamilton, was also an Orangeman and had been auditor of the Ayrshire Grand Lodge.

In February 1979, the UVF bombed two pubs in Glasgow frequented by Catholics. Both pubs were wrecked and a number of people were wounded. Nine Scottish men were convicted for involvement, some of whom were Orangemen. That same year, twelve Scottish UDA members – including several Orangemen – were convicted for a range of crimes, including possession of illegal firearms and serious assault. In 1989, another six UDA members were convicted for possession of illegal firearms. All of the men belonged to an Orange lodge in Perth.
