= John Boyd =

John Boyd may refer to:

== Politicians ==
=== British ===
- Sir John Boyd, 1st Baronet (1718–1800), English sugar merchant
- Sir John Boyd, 2nd Baronet (1750–1815), son of the first baronet Boyd
- Sir John Boyd (diplomat) (1936–2019), British ambassador and former master of Churchill College, Cambridge
- John Boyd (Irish politician) (1789–1862), UK MP for the Irish constituency of Coleraine, 1842–1852 and 1857–1862
- Sir John Boyd of Maxpoffle (1826–1895), Lord Provost of Edinburgh 1888 to 1891

=== American ===
- John Boyd (Wisconsin assemblyman) (1824–1882), English-born American politician in Wisconsin and Kansas
- John Boyd (Connecticut politician) (1799–1881), Connecticut state legislator and Secretary of State
- John Boyd (Texas politician) (1796–1873), American early settler in Texas and state senator
- John Frank Boyd (1853–1945), Nebraska judge and representative
- John H. Boyd (politician) (1799–1868), U.S. Representative from New York
- John W. Boyd (Tennessee politician) (c. 1851–1932), Tennessee assemblyman and attorney
- John W. Boyd (Wisconsin politician) (1811–1892), Wisconsin state senator

=== Canadian ===
- John Boyd (Canadian politician) (1826–1893), Senator and lieutenant-governor of New Brunswick
- Sir John Alexander Boyd (1837–1916), Canadian lawyer and judge
- John Boyd (Canadian communist) (1913—2021), Canadian journalist, editor and Communist activist

== Military figures ==
- John Boyd (military strategist) (1927–1997), US Air Force colonel and fighter pilot
- John Covert Boyd (1850–1924), Naval surgeon and fraternity founder
- John Parker Boyd (1764–1830), American general
- John McNeil Boyd (1812–1861), Royal Navy captain of HMS Ajax, died in the "Boyd disaster" 1861

== Artists ==
- John Boyd (photographer) (1865–1941), Canadian amateur photographer and railway official
- John H. Boyd (photographer) (1898–1971), photographer based in Toronto, Ontario
- John Boyd (author) (1919–2013), science fiction author
- John Boyd (milliner) (1925–2018), fashion designer
- John Boyd (sound engineer), American sound engineer
- John Boyd (actor) (born 1981), American actor
- John Boyd (playwright) (1912–2002), Irish radio producer and playwright

== Association football ==
- Jackie Boyd (1926–2007), American soccer player
- John Boyd (footballer, born 1881) (1881–1927), Scottish footballer
- John Allan Boyd (1929–2019), Scottish footballer (1948 Great Britain Olympic team)
- John Boyd (footballer, born 1969), Scottish footballer (Dumbarton FC, St Mirren)

== Science and medicine ==
- John Boyd (bacteriologist) (1891–1981), bacteriologist and Royal Army Medical Corps officer
- John Morton Boyd (1925–1998), Scottish zoologist and writer
- John St. Clair Boyd (1858–1918), Irish gynaecologist and surgeon

== Other ==
- John Boyd (Bahamas), free person of color in the 19th century
- John Boyd (farmer) (born 1965), African American farmer and civil rights leader
- John Boyd (pastor) (1679–1708), Presbyterian minister in the United States
- John Boyd (police officer) (1933–2024), HM Chief Inspector of Constabulary for Scotland
- John Boyd (trade unionist) (1917–1989), Scottish trade unionist

== See also ==
- John Boyd Orr (1880–1971), Nobel peace laureate
- Boyd (surname)
