= The Loyal True Blue and Orange Home =

Coordinates: 43.90026°N 79.44279°W

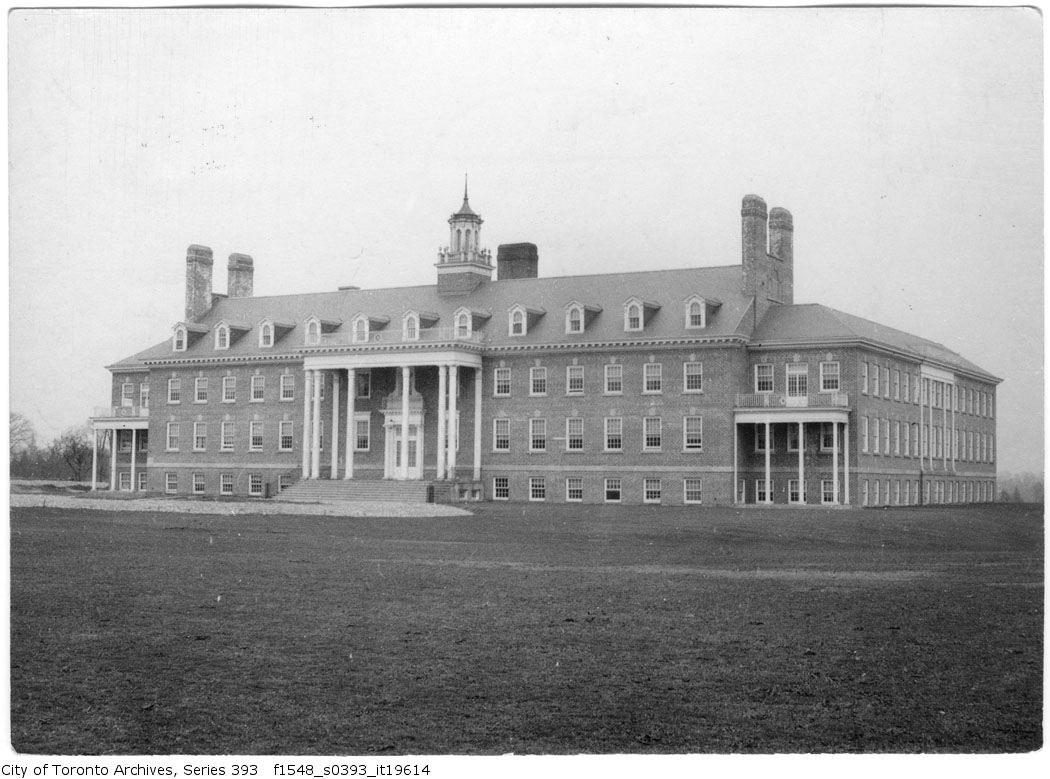
The Loyal True Blue and Orange Home orphanage in Richmond Hill, Ontario, on March 24, 1925, by John Boyd Sr.

The Loyal True Blue and Orange Home is a Colonial Revival architecture building in Richmond Hill, Ontario, a city north of Toronto. It has served a variety of purposes over the years, including an orphanage, school, and centre for mental healthcare, among others. The original property covered 2 blocks, but parts of the land have been sold off over the years and other buildings were built, including 2 seniors homes. The building is included in the Town of Richmond Hill's Inventory of Cultural Heritage Resources.

The building was originally built by William H. Graham in 1901 to be used as an orphanage, and opened in 1923. H.C. Hocken laid the cornerstone. It was founded to take care of underprivileged or orphaned Protestant children. The Home was founded by the Loyal True Blue Association and the Orange Order in Canada. The orphans had to wear specific uniforms so everyone could identify the children as orphans. In 1982 the orphanage was abolished and the children moved to foster care programs. In the same year the building was extended. The Loyal True Blue And Orange Home had to rent rooms to people from the community. Many different organizations operate as part of the home, including the St. John Ambulance, Century Montessori School, The Learning Disabilities Association.

Century Montessori School came to the Loyal True Blue And Orange Home in 1994 and in 1997 the first students arrived. The school's name references the educational methods inspired by Dr. Maria Montessori. Her philosophy of education emphasizes student freedom with logical guidelines. The school is funded solely by tuition fees paid by the parents. The basement has a lab, two gyms, a music room and three classrooms. Today, the building is situated by the intersection of Yonge Street and Silverwood Avenue, near the current Richmond Hill High School building on Yorkland Street.
