= St. Stephen's Anglican Church (Ottawa) =

Coordinates: 45.35458°N 75.79438°W

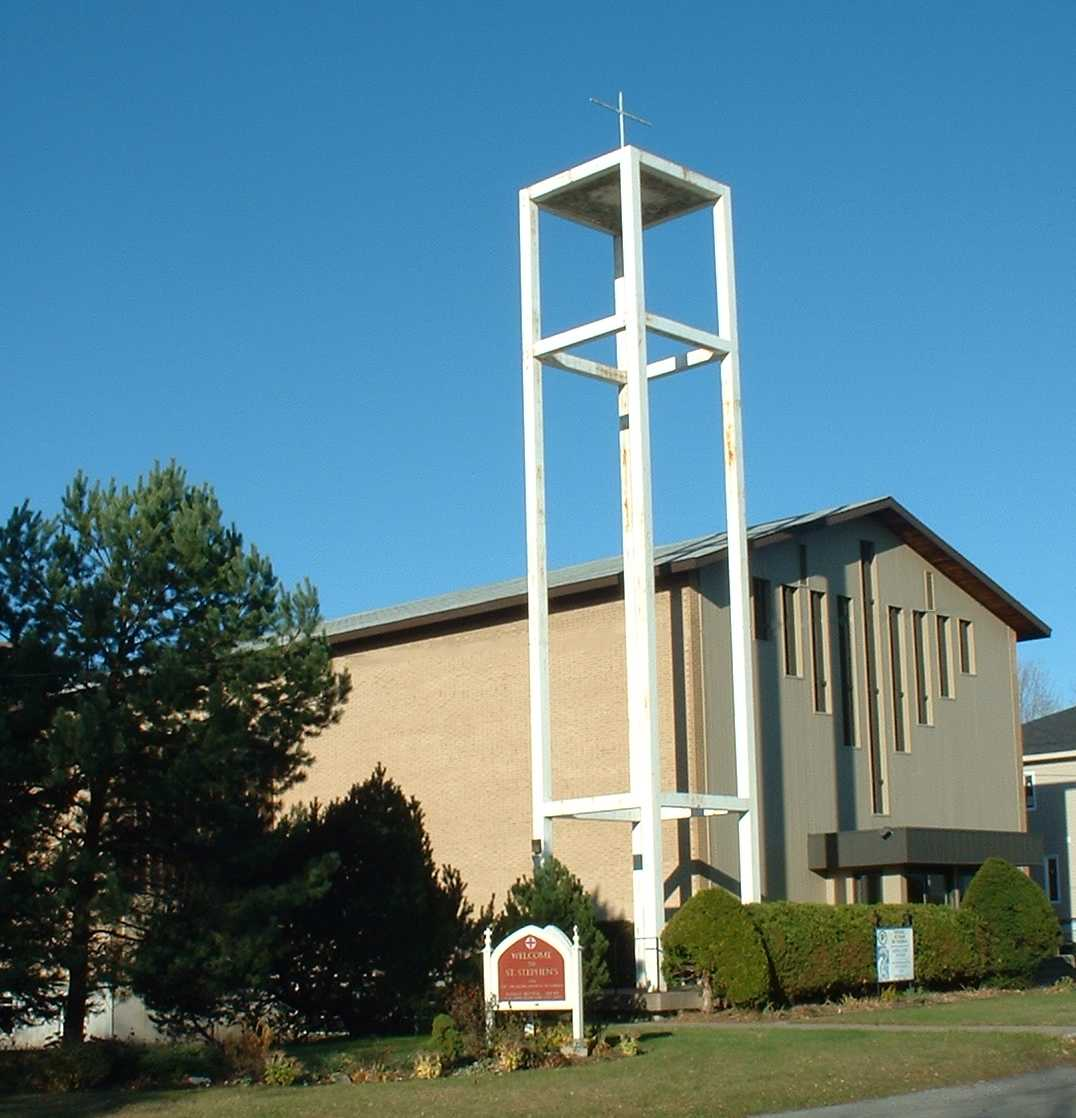
- St. Stephen's Anglican Church Ottawa, Ontario
- St. Stephen's Anglican Church
- Denomination: Anglican Church of Canada

Administration
- Province: Canada
- Diocese: Ontario
- Parish: Anglican Diocese of Ottawa

St. Stephen's Anglican Church is an Anglican Church of Canada parish in Ottawa, Ontario, Canada.

== History ==
=== Open air ceremonies ===
The original Anglican air ceremonies services were held on Sunday afternoons during the summer months of 1886 in Britannia by visiting clergy from the city, Ven Archdeacon Snowdon, Canon Pollard, Archdeacon Bogert and Ven Archdeacon Mackey.

The old St. Stephen's Church was secularized with the late Ven. Archdeacon J. M. Snowdon as one of the founders. Services were first held under the pine trees, with a nearby verandah providing the pulpit.

By 1890 the congregation had grown sufficiently to warrant establishment of proper church organization. In 1890, Rev. W. Jemmett presided at the first vestry meeting held. A. N. McNeill, R N., whose untiring zeal led to the building of the church, was appointed first rector warden and Robert Buriand was elected first people's warden.

Services were regularly held in a hall across the street (now Britannia Road) from the original church. A dispute over ownership of the property resulted in the Anglican residents resolving to build a church of their own. Work began on the church on July 21, 1892, in what was then the main street of Britannia Village, now Britannia Road, through the efforts of Mr. A.N. McNeil. On July 21, 1802, work was commenced under the supervision of Mr. McNeill, who was also responsible for the organization work, the collecting of contributions for the building and the care of finances.

=== St. Stephen's Anglican Church, Britannia ===
On August 7, 1892, the little white church under the pines was formally opened. The Rev. F. B Norrie conducted the service. The Rev. W. J. Muckleson preached the sermon and the lessons were read by A. N. McNeill. Services were conducted that year during the summer months by visiting ministers the Rural Dean Mr. Bogert, the Rev. A. W. Mackey, the Rev. J. M. Snowdon, the Rev. F. B. Norrie and the Rev. F. R. Smith. The first board of trustees of the building were Judge William Mosgrove, Messrs. A. N. McNeill, S. Maynard Rogers. George R. Nettle, Frederick J. Graham and Nicholas C. Sparks.

In 1893, the church was completed; The interior wails and ceiling were finished in polished ash. The steeple was erected according to plans donated by Mr. Edgar Lewis Horwood, the architect. The windows were finished with stained glass windows which were at one time in the old stone Baptist church on Queen Street. On Dominion Day, 1894 the first excursion to be held over the new Gatineau Railway Company's lines was one in aid of the funds of the St. Stephen's Anglican church. The font was donated from the proceeds of children's work. The first baby to be baptized was Morel Reid, niece of Mr. and Mrs. A. N. McNeill.

From 1894 until 1898, the Rev. W. H. Green, rector of Nepean mission was in charge of St. Stephen's. In 1898, Mr. McNeill, who had remained as rector's warden from 1890 to the autumn of 1897, died. In 1898, the Rev. I. J. Christie became rector. He was succeeded in 1902 by the Rev. A. H. Coleman. Since Coleman was unable to conduct the services regularly owing to pressure of work in his other churches, they were taken by clergy from Ottawa.

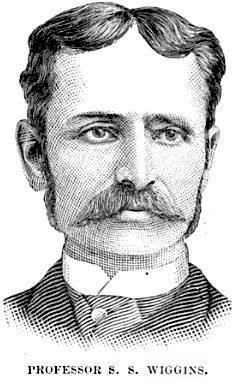
Dr Ezekiel Stone Wiggins

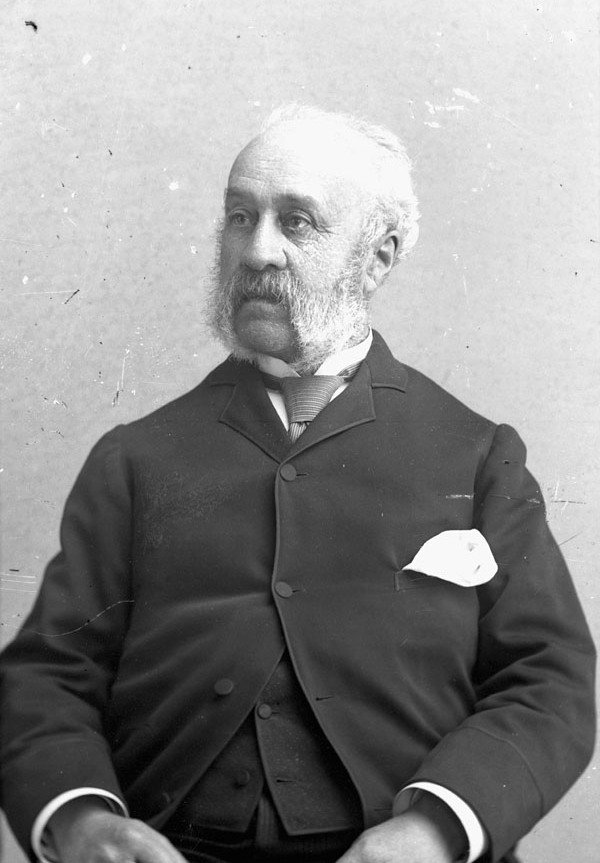
Thomas Fuller

Dr. Ezekiel Stone Wiggins, the author of several scientific, educational and religious works served as Rector's warden in 1901–1902. Thomas Fuller (architect) served as people's warden in 1904.

From 1904 to 1908, the Canon J. J. Lowe was rector and was succeeded in 1909 by E. S. Anderson.

The Rev. R H. Steacy presided at the spring vestry meeting in 1909, at which a motion to have "a good plain Church of England service" was carried. In 1909, Anderson introduced the issue of the division of the parish of Westboro-Britannia from Hintonburg. E. L. Britain attended the synod and announced that St. Stephen's would subscribe $100 per annum towards the stipend of the rector of the new parish. In 1909 the separation of the parish took place with Steacy as the new rector. In 1909, Mrs. A. McNeill donated a communion service.

The first Rector of St Stephen's was the Rev William Jennett.

Until 1909 St. Stephen's was part of the Nepean Mission along with All Saints Westboro and St. Matthias Hintonburg. It then became part of All Saints and yet later a joint parish with St. Martins, Westboro.

In 1915 the Rev. N. H. Snow presided over the vestry meeting since Col. the Rev, R. H. Steacy had gone overseas as director of chaplain services of the Canadian Expeditionary Forces. In October, 1915, St. Stephen's Church Guild was organized. In 1916 the church was consecrated by Charles Roper, then Bishop of Ottawa, the mortgage on the building having been paid off and the mortgage papers burned. The rector returned from the war in 1917 and the Rev. Norman Snow was appointed curate at All Saints', Ottawa.

Electric lighting was installed in 1920. The vestry considered the advisability of conducting services throughout the winter months. On December 6, 1926, a resolution at a special vestry meeting called for the establishment of a new parish of St. Martin's, Woodroffe, and St. Stephen's, Britannia. On May 1, 1927, the separation of these churches from Westboro took effect with the rector, the Rev. W. B. Morgan.

To celebrate the 50th anniversary of the church in June 1936, the preacher at the morning service was the Ven. Archdeacon Snowdon, who, as a young Curate, was one of the first to hold these services which took place in the open or under the shelter of a verandah according to the weather. The preacher at the evening service was Col. the Rev. R.H. Steacy. C M.G., who was in charge of the parish in 1909. A birthday tea was held; the cake was cut by Mrs. George Perley. A parochial evening reception was held for invitees who were identified with the activities and interests of the church during the fifty years. The chairman was the Rev C. O. Hepburn and the guest speaker Mrs. George Black, MP.

An honour roll was unveiled and dedicated at a service in June 1943, lists names of parishioners in the armed forces during World War II including Dennis Foy, who was killed in action.

On May 8, 1951, the St Stephen's Men's Association of St Stephen's Anglican Church Britannia held a dinner at Ye Old Forge, then owned by Mr. and Mrs. William Winthrop. The turkey dinner was provided by the ladies of St Stephen's Guild. After the former rector, the Rev. W. B. Morgan spoke; the Rev. K. R, Cowan, then rector of the parish, announced that the transfer had been completed and the deed received for the new church property recently acquired for the site of the new St Stephen's Church, situated on the southwest corner of Main street (now Britannia) and Cameron avenue in Britannia, one block south of the train tracks. Mr. Haughton made many suggestions regarding the future of the church in Britannia. Pesker Dee a Clark of Christ Church Cathedral, was introduced by G. Orval Skuce and gave a short address on "People".

Mayor Charlotte Whitton was St Stephen's Honoured Guest at the fall tea and bazaar on November 22, 1952. She gave a short address on the need for church work in all spheres of life. In 1952 the decision was taken to create a separate parish due to the growth of the Britannia area. A number of sites were considered before a final choice of the current Watson Street site was made.

=== St. Stephen's Anglican (Watson Street near Pinecrest) ===
The Ottawa architecture firm of Burgess, McLean & MacPhadyen designed St. Stephen's Church in 1953, which is representative of church architecture in the 1950s with its daring lines, sleek mass, contrasting surfaces of brick walls, metal uprights, shingle roof, glass window walls, and laminated support beams inside. The architectural drawings pertaining to Burgess, McLean & MacPhadyen architectural projects 1900-1990 are in Library and Archives Canada. The basement hall seated 350 persons, with a chapel accommodating an additional 40 worshippers. There were Sunday School classrooms, kitchen and washroom. The later church addition seated a congregation of 450 to 800 persons.

The lower hall was built in 1956 and was used for services for six years with the Rev. Edwin Allsop as rector. The first services' were held in the new church home on February 12, 1956, with a temporary altar and communion rail, set up in the basement of the new Church. The official opening was on February 20, 1956. Ven. Archdeacon C. O. Hepburn preached at the morning service, and Rev. William Robinson, rector of St. John's Anglican Church, spoke at evensong. The new church building will be used for divine worship on Sundays and as a hall for social functions connected with the life of the church during the week. The new church was constructed to accommodate an increasing congregation. It was designed so that a minimum of alterations will be necessary when sufficient funds are available to continue with the superstructure.

The official opening ceremonies were held Monday, February 20, 1956, at 5 p m. Rev. J. Edwin Allsopp was inducted as rector by Rt. Rev. Ernest S. Reed, Bishop of Ottawa. The guest preacher was Rev. C. K. Graham, rector of Almonte and rural dean of Lanark.

A parish supper was held February 13, 1956 in the new hall, with Ven. Archdeacon J. C. Anderson. Synod secretary, as speaker. Other services were held Wednesday evening, when Rev. K. R. Cowan, rector of St. Martin's Church, was the speaker, and on Sunday the preachers were Ven. Archdeacon C. C. Mills, Diocesan Commissioner, at the morning service, and Rev. Douglas Christie, rural dean of Ottawa, at evensong.

At the same time a rectory was completed through the movement of an existing house to Watson Street. The old rectory was sold and the current rectory was constructed adjacent to the church in 1961 when the Rev. Eldon Davis was rector. In the following year the upper portion of the church building was added which allowed the lower hall to be used completely for a church school.

The success of the church school was such that the lower hall was found to be inadequate to hold the enrolment of 244 students. A bequest from Miss Mary Lark was used to provide the hall adjacent to the main church building in 1964. It was named after her as a memorial to her long association with the parish.

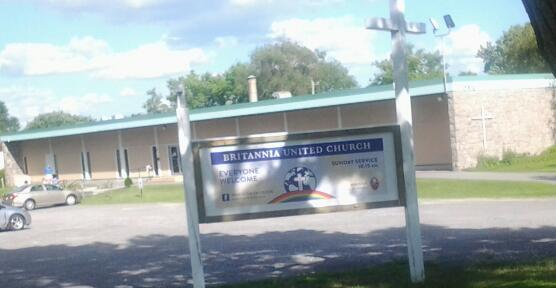
Britannia United Church

Talks among the clergymen Rev. Eldon Davis, St Stephen's rector and Britannia United Church minister Rev. Douglas Lapp and officers of both churches began in March, 1967. St. Stephen's Church in Ottawa's extreme West End served as house of worship for both Anglican and United churchgoers in the area for a one-year trial beginning September 1968. It was agreed during the year trial period the services will be conducted by each denomination the way they have always been. Britannia United, had been holding services in its Christian Education Building, a multi-purpose building used for activities ranging from elderly persons' gatherings to holding dinners. St. Stephen's, in return, made use of Britannia United building for Sunday school classes. This was not an amalgamation of the two congregations but a mutual use of facilities' by the two separate congregations at separate times. With a target date of 1974 set for union between the two denominations, church officials thought the arrangement was ideal. If union had come, there would be no necessity for Britannia United Church to build another church for about $350.000. They felt this energy directed towards paying off mortgages should be directed towards people social action work and the like. So far in Canada there have been only two or three such arrangements, these being in Western Canada.

The Mary Lark Hall was the last major construction project financed through mortgages. All mortgages were retired in late 1989 with the formal consecration of the parish taking place in February 1990.

Since then the Upper Mary Lark Hall has been renovated to accommodate Church School and a Montessori School by subdividing it into classrooms and the addition of an additional washroom.

The kitchen has also been completely renovated.

The worship space was renovated in the mid-1990s to put Christ in the midst of the congregation. This 4-year process involved consultations with the parish members and outside consultants. The altar was moved forward to a central location and the seating was arranged to point inwards toward the altar. A wall was built approximately where the old communion rail was located and behind this wall new choir rooms, a chapel and a storage area were built. This renovation also included new lighting, carpeting, new paint and a professional sound system.

The United Church of Canada and Anglican Church of Canada engaged in the first round of a formal conversation in 2003, the first since the 1975 Plan of Union to merge the two churches failed.

In 2006 the washrooms for the main hall were gutted and renovated resulting in a much needed increased capacity and handicapped availability.

== St. Stephen's Anglican rectors ==
Rector
Rev William Jemmett (1890–92)
Rev F. B. Norrie (1892-1894)
Rev W. H. Green (1894-1808)
Rev I. J. Christie (1898-1902)
Rev A. H. Coleman (1902- 1904)
Rev Canon J.J. Lowe (1904-1908)
Rev E. A. Anderson (1908-1909)
Col the Rev R. H. Steacy (1909-1927)
Rev J. Lynch (1913, locum tenens)
Rev N. H. Snow (1914-1916, locum tenens)
Rev W. B. Morgan (1927-1947)
Rev. Edwin Allsop (1953-4)
Rev. Eldon Davis (1961)
The Reverend Dr. Anne Quick (2013)
