= Orange Order in Canada =

Canadian branch of the Orange Order

Loyal Orange Association in Canada
- Founded: 1812; 214 years ago (independent lodges); Montreal, Lower Canada
- Type: Fraternal order
- Affiliation: Orange Order
- Status: Active
- Emphasis: Protestant
- Scope: National
- Flag
- Nickname: Orange Order in Canada
- Headquarters: 424 Regal Park NE; Calgary, Alberta T2E 0S6; Canada
- Website: grandorangelodge.ca

The Loyal Orange Association in Canada, (Note: historically the Loyal Orange Association in British America and also known as the Loyal Orange Association of Canada, Grand Orange Lodge of Canada, or simply Orange Order in Canada) or simply the Orange Association Canada (OAC), is the Canadian branch of the Orange Order, a Protestant fraternal organization that began in County Armagh in Ireland in 1795. Founded in 1812, the Orange Order in Canada has played a large part in the history of the country, with many prominent members including four prime ministers, among them Sir John A. Macdonald and John Diefenbaker. They promote and commemorate Ulster Scots and Orange heritage. This is observed through Orange parades, the biggest being the Twelfth of July, which commemorates King William III's victory in the Battle of the Boyne.

Representatives from the Grand Orange Lodge of Canada travel to partake in the triennial Imperial Orange Council meetings.

Sentinel News is the official publication of the Loyal Orange Association on Canada.

== Upper Canada and the Province of Canada ==
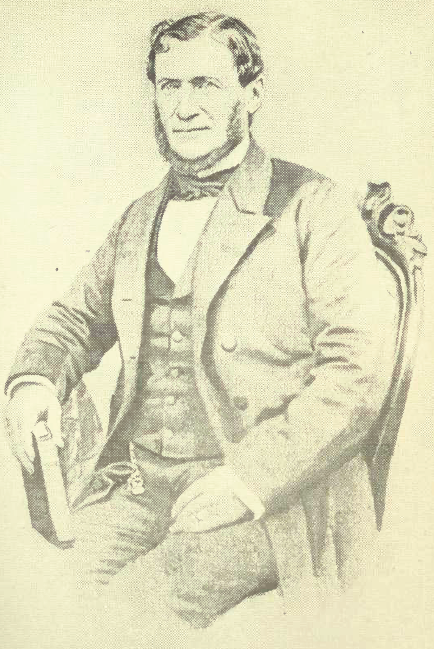
Photo of Ogle Robert Gowan, Grand Master, first Grand Master of the Orange Order in Upper Canada

It is a matter of deep regret that political differences should have run high in this place, and led to most discreditable and disgraceful results. It is not long since guns were discharged from a window in this town at the successful candidates in an election, and the coachman of one of them was actually shot in the body, though not dangerously wounded. But one man was killed on the same occasion; and from the very window whence he received his death, the very flag which shielded his murderer (not only in the commission of his crime, but from its consequences), was displayed again on the occasion of the public ceremony performed by the Governor General, to which I have just adverted. Of all the colours in the rainbow, there is but one which could be so employed: I need not say that flag was orange.

— Charles Dickens, commenting on 1841 Toronto Orange violence in American Notes for General Circulation, 1842

The Orange Lodges have existed in Canada at least since the War of 1812. The first Lodge was established in Montreal by William Burton, Arthur Hopper, John Dyer, Francis Abbott and several others. William Burton travelled to Ireland to obtain the warrant to open the Lodge from the Grand Lodge of Ireland and became the first Grand Master of the Montreal Lodge. In the following years Arthur Hopper was elected the next Grand Master and given the power of granting warrants to subordinate Lodges under the Great Seal of the Grand Lodge of Ireland. The first such Lodge was granted to Robert Birch of Richmond.

The Order was more formally organized in 1830 when Ogle Robert Gowan established the Grand Orange Lodge of British North America in the Upper Canada town of Elizabethtown, which became Brockville in 1832 (according to the plaque outside the original lodge in Brockville, Ontario). Gowan immigrated from Ireland in 1829, and became the Grand Master of the Grand Orange Lodge of British North America. His father was the grand master of the Irish Orange Order. Most early members were from Ireland, but later many Scots, English and other Protestant Europeans joined the Order, in addition to Amerindians, such as those in the Mohawk Orange Lodge which survives into the present day.

=== Fraternal organization ===
The Order was the chief social institution in Upper Canada, organizing many community and benevolent activities, and helping Protestant immigrants to settle. It remained a predominant political force in southern Ontario well into the twentieth century. There were scores of socially prominent citizens who were granted honorary membership but did not actually participate in official lodge business. Surprisingly given its great prestige, although there were many members drawn from the upper and middle classes, lodge membership was predominantly drawn from the ranks of labourers, street railway workers, teamsters, and other elements of the working class.

Besides sentimental patriotic or imperialist motivations, many Orangemen joined because the benefits of mutual aid, security, and health supports made it easier to survive the difficulties of working-class life. Middle-class members, such as professionals, small-shop owners, and tavern-keepers, saw membership in terms of commercial gain through the steady attraction of lodge members as clientele. The Order's degrees and solemn oaths bonded men together as part of a greater whole, and dressing in the order's distinctive sash and regalia for the Twelfth of July parade let members show off their status and achievements to the greater community. The Grand Orange Lodge of British America Benefit Fund was established in 1881 to provide fraternal benefits to members and remains as a modern insurance system.

=== Protestant ascendency and politics in Toronto ===
The Grand Orange Lodge of British America was established in Toronto in 1830, and it expanded steadily so that there were over 20 lodges in 1860, 31 in 1880, and 56 by 1895. At the turn of the century, Toronto was nicknamed "The Belfast of Canada". Historian Hereward Senior has noted that the Orange Order's political ideal was expressed in the word "ascendancy." Senior said:

This meant, in effect, control of the volunteer militia, of much of the machinery of local government, and substantial influence with the Dublin administration. Above all, it meant the ability to exert pressure on magistrates and juries, which gave Orangemen a degree of immunity from the law. Their means of securing ascendancy had been the Orange lodges which provided links between Irish Protestants of all classes. This ascendancy often meant political power for Protestant gentlemen and a special status for Protestant peasants.

In the context of Toronto, such ascendancy was sought through the Corporation (as the administration of the city of Toronto was known). By 1844, six of Toronto's ten aldermen were Orangemen, and over the rest of the nineteenth century twenty of twenty-three mayors would be as well.

==== Control of 'the Corporation' ====
The Orange Order became a central facet of life in many parts of Canada, especially in the business centre of Toronto where many deals and relationships were forged at the lodge. Toronto politics, especially on the municipal level, were almost wholly dominated by the Orange Order. An influential weekly newspaper, The Sentinel, promoted Protestant social and political views and was widely circulated throughout North America.

The Protestant Protective Association was founded in the 1890s, arising out of the "Equal Rights agitation," and was supported principally by members of the Orange Order. Several of its members ran for political office and were elected in 1894.

At its height in 1942, 16 of the 23 members of city council were members of the Orange Order. Every mayor of Toronto in the first half of the twentieth century was an Orangeman. This continued until the 1954 election when the Jewish Nathan Phillips defeated staunch Orange leader Leslie Howard Saunders.

==== Electoral riots ====
"Ascendancy," or control of the legal and political machinery, gave the Orange Order a perceived monopoly on the use of "legitimate" violence. Between 1839 and 1866, the Orange Order was involved in 29 riots in Toronto, of which 16 had direct political inspiration. The violent disturbances were targeted at candidates who wanted political equality for French-Canadians such as Louis-Hippolyte Lafontaine, the Children of Peace of Sharon, of which members of the Orange Order killed an adherent, and English reformers who were opposed to the Family Compact, such as Robert Baldwin. Many electoral riots took place during the election of the 1st Parliament of the Province of Canada and Baldwin's ministerial by-election after appointment to the executive council.

=== Ottawa ===
The Orangemen, members of the various Ottawa, Westboro and Billings Bridge Lodges as well as lodges from outlying towns paraded from the Orange Hall, Gloucester Street to St. Matthew's Anglican Church (Ottawa) on 10 July 1938.

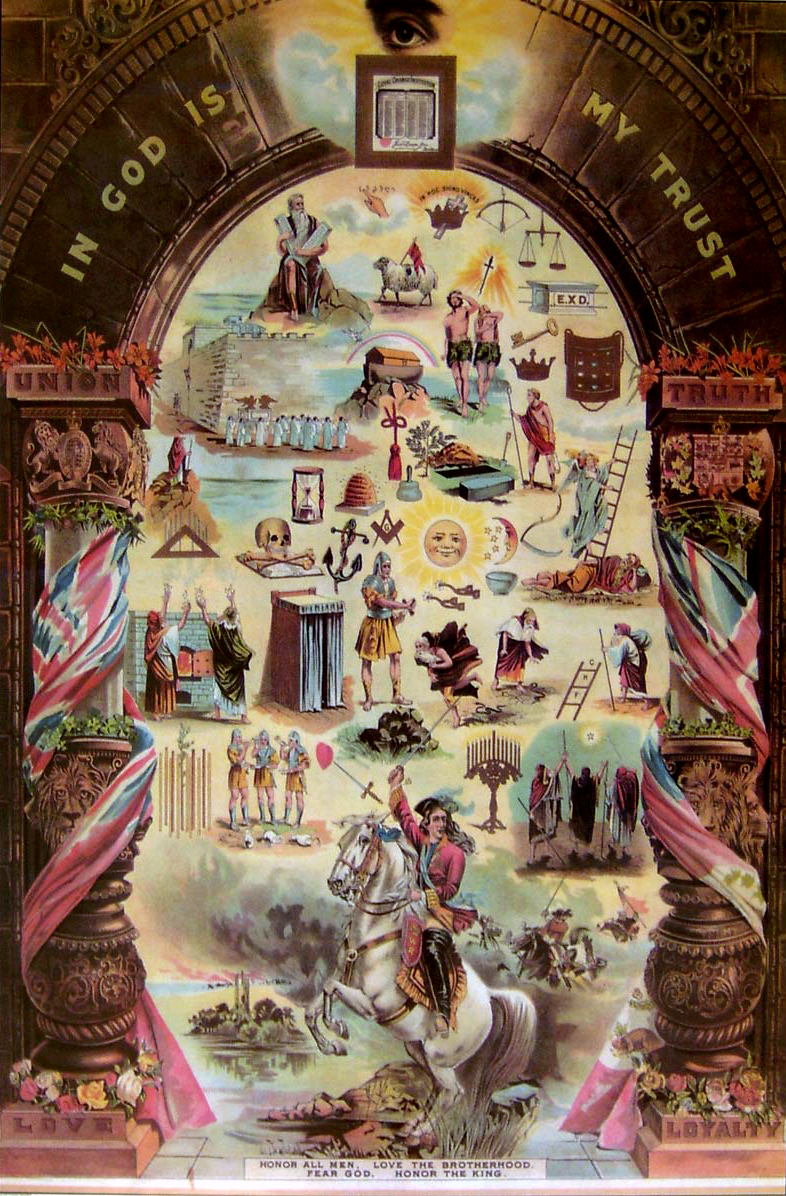
Orange Order poster depicting historical and religious symbols

== In the rest of British America ==
The Orange Lodge was a centre for community activity in Newfoundland. For example, in 1903 Sir William Coaker founded the Fisherman's Protective Union (FPU) in an Orange Hall in Herring Neck. Furthermore, during the term of Commission of Government (1934–1949), the Orange Lodge was one of only a handful of "democratic" organizations that existed in the Dominion of Newfoundland. It supported Newfoundland's confederation with Canada in reaction to Catholic bishops' support for self-government.

The Orange Order was also a force in New Brunswick, such that riots surrounding Orange marches occurred in the 1840s (a period of Irish mass immigration) in New Brunswick. Even tiny Woodstock, New Brunswick, experienced a riot in 1847 on The Twelfth (12 July, the anniversary of the Battle of the Boyne), near a now-vanished Orange Hall at the corner of Victoria and Boyne streets. The height of conflict was a riot in Saint John, New Brunswick, on 12 July 1849, in which at least 12 people died. The violence subsided as Irish immigration declined, though even in 1883, 5 were killed in Harbour Grace, Newfoundland in the "usual" "collision" "between Orangemen and Roman Catholics", in an event that became known as The Harbour Grace Affray.

After 1945, the Canadian Orange Order rapidly declined in membership and political influence. The development of the welfare state made its fraternal society functions less important. A more important cause of the decline was the secularization of Canadian society: with fewer Canadians attending churches of any sort, the old division between Protestant and Catholic seemed less relevant. Perhaps even more important was the decline of the British Empire and consequently the reduced value of maintaining the 'British Connection' which had always underpinned the Order. The Twelfth remains a provincial holiday in the province of Newfoundland and Labrador under the name Orangeman's Day.

=== Province of Alberta ===
Historian William Baergen notes that White Anglo Saxon Protestantism (WASP) was a foundational feature of the early settlement in Alberta. He notes that as immigrants from non-Anglo-Saxon regions of Europe entered the province in greater numbers between 1921 and 1931 that there was a corresponding rise in "Anglo-Saxon racism, anti-Catholicism and immigrant phobia". Baergen says that "the more radical white Anglo-Saxon Protestants were represented by the Orange Order, and formed the essence of the anti-Catholic and anti-foreigner agenda that emerged in Alberta during the period from 1929–1933. Baergen notes that "Wherever the dominance of the British way appeared threatened, an Orange Lodge could be expected to appear."

In a letter to Alberta Premier John Edward Brownlee on December 13, 1927, the Hesketh Loyal Orange Lodge, No. 3013 congratulated the premier on his stand restricting immigration to the province, saying "By unanimous vote of the members of this lodge... I have been instructed to write and congratulate you on your stand re THE EMIGRATION POLICY and its ADMINISTRATION [sic]"

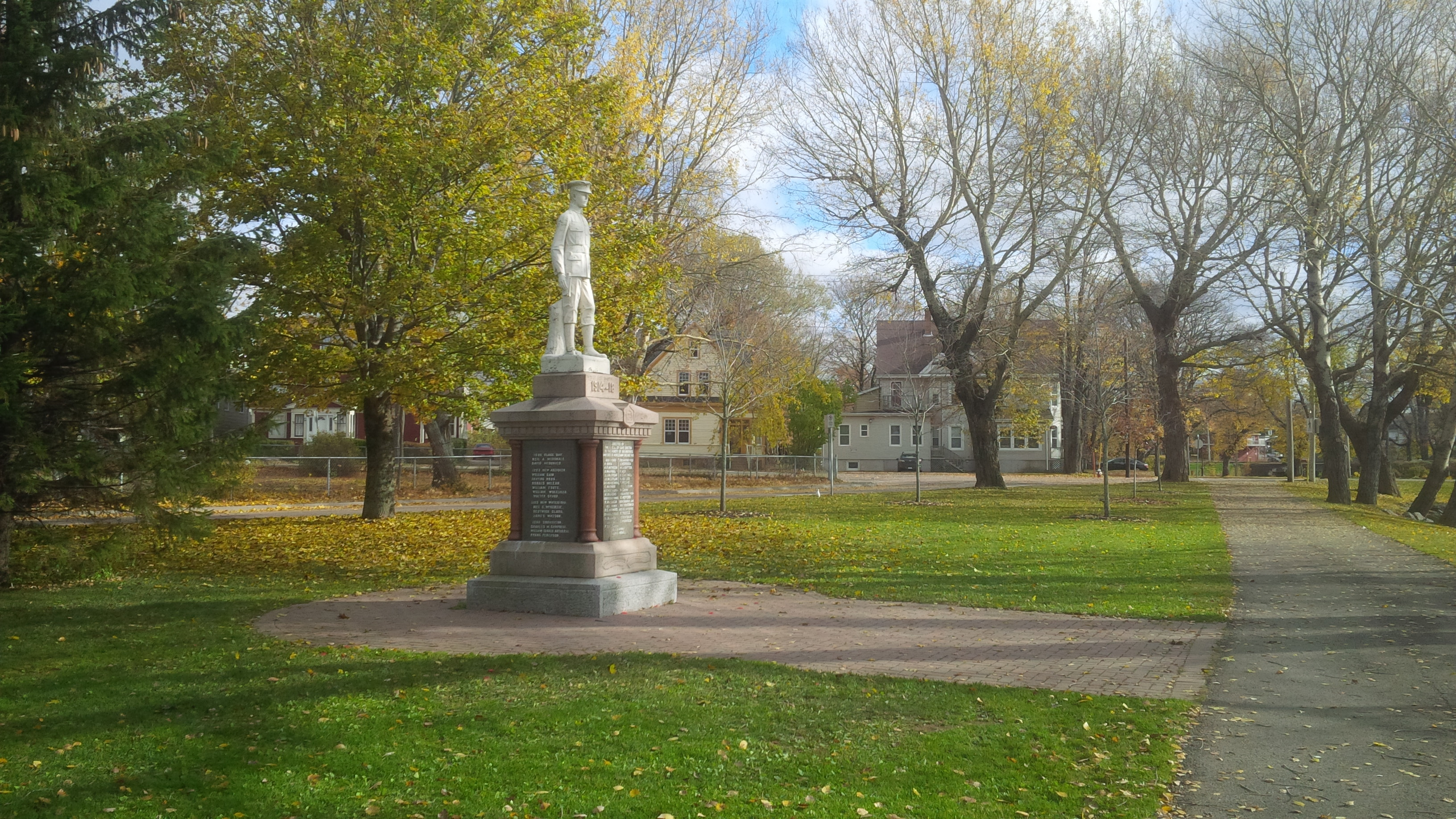
Orangemen War Memorial in Wentworth Park, Sydney, Nova Scotia

== Orangemen and war ==
Orangemen played a big part in suppressing the Upper Canada Rebellion of William Lyon Mackenzie in 1837. Though the rebellion was short-lived, 317 Orangemen were sworn into the local militia by the Mayor of Toronto and then resisted Mackenzie's march down Yonge Street in 1837.

They were involved in resisting the Fenians at the Battle of Ridgeway in 1866. An obelisk there marks the spot where Orangemen died in defending the colony against an attack by members of Clan na Gael (commonly known as Fenians).

Orangemen in western Canada helped suppress the rebellions of Louis Riel in 1870 and 1885. The killing of abducted Orangeman Thomas Scott was a turning point in the 1870 Red River Rebellion which caused the Dominion government to launch the Wolseley expedition to restore order. The first Orange warrant in Manitoba and the North-West Territories was carried by a member of this expedition.

In 1913, the Orange Association of Manitoba volunteered a regiment to fight with the Ulster Volunteers against British forces if Home Rule were to be introduced to Ireland.

== Lodges ==
At its peak in 1920, the Orange Order had 2,000 lodges with about 100,000 members throughout Canada and the Dominion of Newfoundland.

Orange Order in Canada is organized under Grand Lodges, but its structure in Canada has both a national Grand Lodge and provincial Grand Lodges, as well as youth and women's lodges.

=== List of Canadian Grand Orange Lodges ===
- Grand Orange Lodge of Canada – The national governing body; coordinates and oversees the provincial Grand Lodges.
- Grand Orange Lodge of Ontario – Historically the largest and most influential, centered in Toronto.
- Ontario Ladies Provincial Orange Lodge
- Grand Orange Lodge of Newfoundland and Labrador – Very active historically; strong cultural presence in rural Newfoundland.
- Newfoundland & Labrador Ladies Provincial Orange Lodge
- Grand Orange Lodge of New Brunswick
- New Brunswick Ladies Provincial Orange Lodge
- Grand Orange Lodge of Nova Scotia
- Grand Orange Lodge of Manitoba
- Grand Orange Lodge of Saskatchewan, smaller but historically notable in early settlement communities.
- Grand Orange Lodge of Alberta, formed during westward expansion.
- Grand Orange Lodge of British Columbia
- Ladies’ Orange Benevolent Association
- Loyal Orange Young Britons, junior lodge

== Notable members ==
Four members of the Orange Order have been prime ministers of Canada, namely Sir John A. Macdonald, the father of Canadian Confederation, Sir John Abbott, Sir Mackenzie Bowell (a past Grand Master), and John Diefenbaker, in addition to many Ontario premiers.

The Orange Order played an important role in bringing Newfoundland into Confederation. Several of the diplomats who negotiated the Terms of Union in 1947 were members of the Orange Order: Joseph Smallwood (Royal Oak Lodge), P.W. Crummey (a past Newfoundland grand master), and F.G. Bradley (a past Newfoundland grand master).

Edward Frederick Clarke, a prominent editor and publisher, served as a member of the Legislative Assembly of Ontario from 1886 to 1904 and as a Member of Parliament from 1896 to 1905. The 17th governor general, Lord Alexander of Tunis was reputedly a member of the Orange Order as noted by the Grand Orange Lodge of British America. Until the late 1960s, almost all mayors of Toronto were Orangemen with William Dennison being the last Orangeman to serve in office (1967–1972).

Orangeman Alexander James Muir (Toronto Lodge) wrote both the music and lyrics to the Canadian patriotic song "The Maple Leaf Forever" in 1867. The song was considered for the role of national anthem in the 1960s. Angus Walters (Loyal Orange Lodge 63, Lunenburg) was the skipper of the Bluenose. Hockey Hall of Fame inductee George Dudley was an Orangeman, and served 43 years as Midland, Ontario's town solicitor.

== Grand Black Chapter of Canada ==
The Grand Black Chapter of Canada, originally registered as the Grand Black Chapter of British America, serves as the national governing body for the Royal Black Institution in Canada. It was formed in 1874 and is based in Toronto. Admission is strictly conditional upon first being an active member of the Orange Order and holding the Royal Arch Purple degree.

=== List of Canadian Royal Black Districts ===
In Canada, 160 Preceptories operate across 6 District Chapters under the Provincial Grand Black Chapter of British America:

- Newfoundland: 73
- Ontario West: 39
- Eastern Ontario: 24
- New Brunswick: 8
- Nova Scotia: 6
- Manitoba: 4

== Apprentice Boys of Derry ==
The Apprentice Boys of Derry is a Protestant organization with close ties to the Orange Order. In Canada, there are members and clubs. Branch clubs in Canada operate as individual branch units chartered by parent clubs in Derry.

Branch clubs include the No Surrender Club Ottawa Branch in East Ontario, and the Toronto Murray Club, located on Kennedy Road, Toronto . The latter was inaugurated in August 1960.

== See also ==
- Orange Heritage Week
- Orange Order in the United States
- Orange Order in Africa
- Orange Order in Australia
- Orange Order in New Zealand
- Orange Order in the Republic of Ireland
- Grand Orange Lodge of Ireland
- Grand Orange Lodge of Scotland
- Grand Orange Lodge of England
- The Loyal True Blue and Orange Home
- Anti-Quebec sentiment
- List of general fraternities

== Notes ==
Articles

- Ireland, Patrick R. "Irish Protestant migration and politics in the USA, Canada, and Australia: a debated legacy." Irish studies review 20.3 (2012): 263-281.
- Jenkins, William. "Homeland Crisis and Local Ethnicity: The Toronto Irish and the Cartoons of the Evening Telegram 1910–1914." Urban History Review 38.2 (2010): 48-63. online
- Livermore, J.D. "The Orange Order and the Election of 1861 in Kingston," in To Defend and Preserve: Essays on Kingston in the Nineteenth Century (Montreal, 1976): 245-59.
- MacRaild, Donald M. "Wherever Orange is worn: Orangeism and Irish migration in the 19th and early 20th centuries." The Canadian Journal of Irish Studies (2002): 98-117.
- MacRaild, Donald M. "Transnationalising "Anti‐Popery": Militant Protestant Preachers in the Nineteenth‐Century Anglo‐World." Journal of Religious History 39.2 (2015): 224-243.
- O'Connor, Ryan. ""...you can beat us in the House of Assembly, but you can't beat us in the street": The Symbolic Value of Charlottetown's Orange Lodge Riot", in CCHA Historical Studies (Volume 72, 2006), pp. 71–94.]
- Johnston A. J. B. "Popery and Progress: Anti-Catholicism in Mid-Nineteenth-Century Nova Scotia", in Dalhousie Review, Vol. 64, No 1 (1984): p. 146-163.
- See, Scott W., "The Orange Order and Social Violence in Mid-Nineteenth Century Saint John", in Acadiensis, Vol. 13, No 1 (autumn 1983): p. 68-92.
- Vaughan, Geraldine. "A Global Network: Ultra-Protestant Societies Throughout the British World." in Anti-Catholicism and British Identities in Britain, Canada and Australia, 1880s-1920s (Cham: Springer International Publishing, 2022): 31-71.
- Wallace, W. Stewart, ed., "Orange Association of British North America", in The Encyclopedia of Canada, Vol. V, Toronto, University Associates of Canada, 1948, 401p., pp. 60–61.

Thesis

- Strauch, Timothy Edgard. Walking for God and Raising Hell. The Jubilee Riots, The Orange Order and the Preservation of Protestantism in Toronto, 1875, Queen's University, Kingston, Ontario, April 1999 (online)
- Thomson, Andrew (1983). The Sentinel and Orange and Protestant Advocate, 1877-1896: An Orange view of Canada (M.A. thesis). Wilfrid Laurier University.
