= Cecil Burgess =

Canadian architect

- Born: 8 July 1888; Walkden, Lancashire, England
- Died: 23 July 1956 (aged 68); Ottawa, Ontario, Canada
- Occupation: Architect
- Practice: Weeks & Burgess (1914); Millson & Burgess (1915–1922); Millson, Burgess & Hazelgrove (1923–24); Millson & Burgess (1925–26); C. Burgess (1927–33); Burgess & Gardner (1934–42); C. Burgess (1945–51); Burgess and McLean (1952–58); Burgess, McLean and MacPhadyen (1958–1967)
- Buildings: St. Peter's Lutheran Church, Ottawa, St. Matthew's Anglican Church (Ottawa), Britannia United Church

Cecil Burgess (1888–1956) was a Canadian architect. He was born in Walkden, Lancashire, England on 8 July 1888. He was educated Walkden, Lancashire, England. He articled to Henry Kirkby, an architect in Manchester, England. Cecil Burgess arrived in Ottawa, Ontario with his parents in 1905. He married Violet Hervey from Round Hill, Nova Scotia, in 1913. The couple had a son, Bernard W. Burgess of Montreal, and a daughter, Mrs. Barbara Joyce Greenwood.

He was a prominent Ottawa architect. At various times, he lived at 34 Echo Drive and at 25 Bellwood in Ottawa South. He was a charter member of the Ottawa Kiwanis Club. Cecil Burgess was a philanthropist. He served as a director of the Ottawa Boys' Club from 1939 to 1956. He died in hospital in Ottawa, Ontario on July 23, 1956 at 68 after a short illness. His funeral was held at Trinity Anglican Church, one of his works. The service was conducted by Rev. Wilfred Bradley, assisted by. Archdeacon J. C. Anderson.

He worked and partner with several prominent architects including his former employer Arthur Weeks, Richard Millson, and Edwin Gardner. During the Second World War, Burgess moved to Nova Scotia where he oversaw the construction of 80 buildings for the naval base HMCS Cornwallis before returning to Ottawa. Many of Burgess buildings reflected his interest in modern Art-Deco architecture. He used a Modern Classicism style (also known as Stripped Classicism) with elegant dashes of Art Deco in many of his later works in Ottawa.

== Career ==
He worked as a draughtsman and assistant for the firm of Weeks and Keefer in Ottawa 1908–1910. He worked on his own under the company name of Burgess & Co. 1910–1914. He partnered with Arthur L. B. Weeks, under the company name of Weeks and Burgess 1914. Burgess partnered with Richard H. Millson, under the company name of Millson & Burgess 1915–1922. Albert James Hazelgrove joined the partnership under the company name of Millson, Burgess & Hazelgrove 1923–24. He partnered with Richard H. Millson, under the company name of Millson & Burgess 1925–26. Burgess was alone under the company name of C. Burgess 1927–33; from 1927, Burgess worked with an associate Edwin Alexander Gardner. Burgess partnered with Edwin Alexander Gardner under the company name of Burgess and Gardner 1934–42. In 1942 Gardner entered the federal public service; Gardner became chief architect at the Department of Public Works from 1952 to 1963. Cecil Burgess was alone under the company name of C. Burgess 1945–51. He partnered with J. Malcolm McLean under the company name of Burgess and McLean 1951–1958. Murdoch MacPhadyen became a partner under the company name of Burgess, McLean and MacPhadyen 1958–1967. After Burgess died in 1956, J. Malcolm McLean and Murdoch MacPhadyen remained sole associates under the company name McLean and MacPhadyen.

== Works ==
Burgess designed buildings in the greater Ottawa region, with a few projects in Rockliffe Park, Renfrew, Perth, North Bay or Cornwall, Ontario. A significant portion of the projects are new, renovations or modifications to existing private dwellings, office buildings, churches for private clients or institutions such as government departments, hospitals, school boards.

He designed dozens of churches, schools, homes, apartments and civic buildings. Burgess notable works in Ottawa includes The Coliseum at Lansdowne Park, Ashbury College, the Bank of Montreal (today Massine's Independent Grocer) and No. 11 Fire Hall on Parkdale Ave in Hintonburg. The National Archives of Canada holds a large collection of drawings for more than 250 projects executed by Burgess and the various firms in which he practised from 1910 until 1962. The Burgess firm handled some 5O school projects from Deep River, Ontario to Cornwall, Ontario.

=== Burgess & Co. (1910–1914) ===
- United Brothers Jewish Synagogue, Rideau Street near Chapel Street, 1912; demol. c. 1960
- Residence Monkland Ave., Ottawa for Messrs. Shuttleworth & Black, Ottawa, Ontario. 1910

=== Weeks and Burgess (1914–1915) ===
- Ashbury College,
- Ottawa Hunt and Golf Club
- Rivermead Golf Club House,
- Rosenthal Building
- Birks Building on Sparks Street,
- Fire Hall No.5 on King Edward
- Bank of Montreal at Somerset and Bank (now part of the Hartman's Metro grocery store).

=== Burgess and Millson (1915–1922) ===
- St. Andrew's Presbyterian Church (1927) Perth, Ontario, which was built in the Gothic Revival design, has been recognized for its heritage value by the Town of Perth on 12 May 1992, By-law 2979
- Hull Iron and Steel Foundry Office (1915), 205 Montcalm Street, Hull, Quebec, was formally Recognized on 1993/12/16 as a Federal Heritage Building.
- Canadian Battlefields Memorial (1921) finalist for competition entry of Gothic stone tower
- the Larocque Department Store, Rideau and Dalhousie, Ottawa;
- the Plant Bath, Somerset and Preston, Ottawa;
- the Blackburn Building, Spark Street, Ottawa;
- Fire Hall No.11, Parkdale Avenue, Ottawa;
- St. John Anglican Church in Kars, Ontario;
- Holy Name Catholic Church in Pembroke, Ontario;
- Holy Name Catholic School in Pembroke, Ontario;
- the Carnegie Library in Renfrew, Ontario.

=== Millson, Burgess, & Hazelgrove (1923–24) ===
- Lansdowne Park, Howick Hall (Later The Coliseum), Exhibition Grounds, Bank Street At Holmwood Avenue, 1926, Art Deco civic building in the Chicago Style; The rapid construction was due to the innovative use of structural steel and reinforced concrete to create an internal building skeleton upon which was fixed a cladding of bricks and glazed windows.
- Parkdale Fire Station (1924), Fire Station 11, 424 Parkdale Avenue, which incorporates some Modern Classical style elements, was formally recognized as one of Canada's Historic Places 1996/02/07.

=== C. Burgess (1927–1933) ===
- 170 Clemow, (1926–7), now the High Commission for Cameroon, formerly residence of an Ottawa Mayor Frank Plant (1884–1952)
- Palace Court Apartments, Elgin Street At Mcleod Street, For S. Miller, 1927–28
- Elmdale Public School, Iona Street, 1928
- Residence For W.H. Dwyer, Clemow Avenue, 1929
- Residence For E. Keith Davidson, Mariposa Road, At Manor Avenue, 1929
- St. Matthew's Anglican Church (Ottawa), Chapel and Parish Hall 1929–1930 on 217 First Avenue at Bank, Gothic Revival, Stripped Classicism Neo Gothic early version of Art Deco
- Windsor Arms Apartments 150 Argyle, For Stuart Christie, 1929 Stripped Classicism early version of Art Deco
- The Duncannon Apartments, 216 Metcalfe Street, 1931, Stripped Classicism early version of Art Deco
- Val Cartier Apartments, Cartier Street At Somerset Street West, 1931 Stripped Classicism early version of Art Deco
- Trafalgar Apartments, Metcalfe Street At Gladstone Avenue, For Wolf Shenkman, 1931 Stripped Classicism early version of Art Deco
- Residence For Frank H. Plant, 1927 Clemow Avenue,
- St. Andrew's Presbyterian Church, 1927–28 Perth, Ont.,
- Presbyterian Church, Pembroke Street At Henry Street, Pembroke, Ontario, 1928
- The Balderson Theatre, Perth, Ontario, Major Alterations 1930
- Dominion House Furniture Co., Bank Street At Gloucester Street, Retail Store, 1933
- Residence For Dr. Joseph P. Gilhooly, Range Road, 1933–34

=== Burgess & Gardner (1934–1942) ===
- Postal Terminal Building on Besserer Street, (1935–6) 6-storey Art Deco post office was demolished to make way for the Rideau Centre.

- Hockey rink, Arnprior, Ontario, 1946–47
- Allison Gardens, Sackville, New Brunswick 1948
- residence for Keith Davidson, 1936 Rockliffe Park, Ottawa
- two residences for unidentified clients, Arnprior, Ontario
- residence for Col. Edward R. McNeill, Sherwood Drive, Ottawa 1942
- Bethany Hope Centre, 1140 Wellington Street West, 1941, an addition was added to the rear of the building to provide extra living space for the tenants
- Hulse, Playfair & McGarry Funeral Home Ltd, 315 McLeod major addition 1930s, Tudor Revival building

=== World War II ===
- HMCS Cornwallis naval base (80 buildings), Deep Brook, Nova Scotia (1942–1944)

=== C. Burgess & Co. (1945–1951) ===
- Winchester General Hospital, Winchester, Ontario, 1947
- Trinity Anglican Church, Bank Street at Cameron Avenue, post-fire reconstruction, 1947–48
- Cornwall public school, S.S. No. 2, Cornwall, Ontario, addition, 1947
- Parkdale United Church, Parkdale Avenue at Gladstone Avenue, major addition, 1949
- South Hull Protestant School, Hull, Quebec 1949
- St. Peter's Lutheran Church, Ottawa, Lyon Street at Nepean Street, 1950–52
- Manor Park Public School, Braemar Street, Manor Park, Ottawa 1950
- Perth public school, Perth, Ontario, 1950
- Shawville High School, Shawville, Quebec, 1950
- Minto Skating Club Rink, Henderson Avenue, rebuilding of the rink, 1950
- Arnprior High School, major addition Arnprior, Ontario, 1950
- War Memorial Rink, Campbellton, New Brunswick, 1950
- Grant Public School, 2720 Richmond Road East, major renovation, 1949

=== Burgess and McLean (1952–58) ===
- 273 Donald Street (1957), Ottawa, Ontario
- Forintek Building complex, 800 Montreal Road, 1958. Designated by The Federal Heritage Buildings Review Office (FHBRO) in 1997 as "recognized."

=== Burgess, McLean and MacPhadyen (1958–1967) ===
- Whitney Buildings at the Royal Ottawa Hospital
- Élisabeth-Bruyère Health Centre, Ottawa General Hospital
- Eastern Ontario Institute of Technology, Woodroffe Avenue, south of Baseline Road, (later referred to as the Woodroffe campus of Algonquin College), 1964
- Eastern Ontario Institute of Technology, Lees Aveouenear the Rideau river, (later referred to as the Rideau campus of Algonquin College), now the University of Ottawa, $3,750,000; 1964
- Ottawa Teachers' College, Alta Vista Drive, near Ridgemont High School, at Heron Road; 1964
- Porter's Island Home for the Aged, 1963 with John Le-Fort and Sam Gitlerman
- Mutual Life of Canada, 80 Argyle Avenue, Queensview Construction and Development, Ltd.
- New Controlled Environment Facility at Carleton University
- Dominion Bureau of Statistics Tower in Tunney's Pasture, Scott at Holland.
- St. Aidan's Anglican Church, Ottawa
- St. David's Presbyterian Church, Ottawa
- St. Martin's Presbyterian Church, Ottawa
- St Timothy's Presbyterian Church, Alta Vista Drive. contemporary style, 1963
- Trinity St. Andrews Church in Renfrew.
- St. Stephen's Anglican Church (Ottawa)
- Britannia United Church, Pinecrest Road, Ottawa
- Morison Public School, Deep River Ontario, major addition of 6 classrooms 1967
- Keys Public School, Deep River Ontario, major addition 1967 Auditorium, Gymnasium, Classroom, laboratory, Shop

- Hawthorne Public School, St Laurent Boulevard, Ottawa, 1963 built by C. A. Johannsen and Sons Ltd.
- Ottawa Youth Services Bureau Boys' Residence (1966), 2887 Riverside Drive, $75,000
- Pinecrest Recreation Center, centennial swimming pool, Pinecrest Road, 1966
- Field House, L. D. Zuccarini building, S67.000, Park-centre on the Belfast Road and Kirchoffer

https://www.newspapers.com/newspage/44456410/

Property	Address	Ward	Construction Date	Architect	Photo
Ashbury College	362 Mariposa Avenue	Somerset	1914	Weeks and Burgess	
Plant Bath	130 Preston Street	Somerset	1924	Millson, Burgess and Hazelgrove	
Lansdowne Park Coliseum	1015 Bank Street	Somerset	1926	Millson, Burgess and Hazelgrove	
St. Matthew's Anglican Church (Ottawa)	217 First Ave	Somerset	1929	Cecil Burgess	
The Duncannon	216 Metcalfe Street	Somerset	1931	Cecil Burgess	
Windsor Arms Apartments	150 Argyle Avenue	Somerset	1930	Cecil Burgess	
CFB Cornwallis	Cornwallis Park	Deep Brook, Nova Scotia	1945	Cecil Burgess	
St. Peter's Lutheran Church, Ottawa	Lyon Street	Somerset	1952	Burgess, McLean and MacPhadyen	
St. Stephen's Anglican Church (Ottawa)	930 Watson Street	Lincoln Heights	1953	Burgess, McLean and MacPhadyen	
Britannia United Church	Pinecrest Road	Lincoln Heights	1961	Burgess, McLean and MacPhadyen	
