= St. Peter's Lutheran Church (Ottawa) =

Coordinates: 45.418357°N 75.707066°W

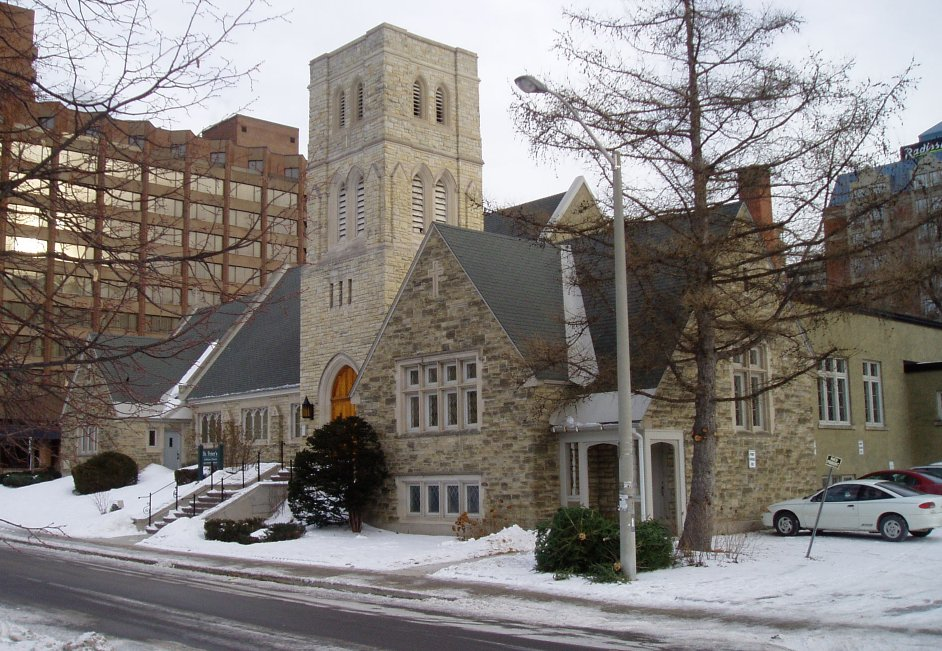
- St. Peter's Lutheran Church
- St. Peter's Lutheran Church
- Location: 400 Sparks Street; Ottawa, Ontario; K1R 5A2
- Denomination: Evangelical Lutheran Church in Canada
- Website: St. Peter's Lutheran Church Website

History
- Status: Active
- Dedication: St. Peter
- Dedicated: 1954

Architecture
- Functional status: Active
- Architect: Cecil Burgess
- Style: Gothic style
- Groundbreaking: 1951
- Completed: 1954

Specifications
- Materials: sandstone

Clergy
- Pastor: Rev. Joel Crouse

St. Peter's Evangelical Lutheran Church is a church in Ottawa, Ontario, Canada situated on Ottawa's ceremonial route and overlooks the Garden of the Provinces, the Ottawa River and the Gatineau Hills. St. Peter's is an Ottawa landmark. The motto is "A community of faith seeking to grow in God's grace and love".

== History ==
The church was established in 1910 with 66 members. On July 10, 1910, the first services were held with 46 persons attending the morning and 40 attending in the evening at King's Daughters Hall, 214 Laurier Avenue. St. Peter's Evangelical Lutheran Church was established July 10, 1910 with 66 members. A permanent organization is established with 66 charter members on October 9, 1910. The Church Council met for the first time and selected the name "St. Peter's Evangelical Lutheran Church of Ottawa" October 19, 1912.

The early members were predominantly of European origin, whether residents of Ottawa, recent immigrants, or arrivals from neighbouring towns and rural communities. In April 1913, a property at Lyon and Nepean Streets was purchased which consisted of three small houses with sufficient land behind them to erect a small church. Plans for the church were approved and building began on Lyon Street on September 24, 1914. The first building was dedicated on Easter Sunday April 12, 1914. St. Peter's was without a pastor from 1915 to 1917. With a congregation of only 40 members, foreclosure was threatened on the debt in 1918. Pastor Luther McCreery served at St. Peter's in 1919-1930. He canvassed for donations in order to keep St. Peter's open, reduce the debt and for a building fund. The membership rose to 100.

After many years of financial hardship, the congregation gradually increased and outgrew its church building. In fall 1937, a two-manual Franklin-Legge organ was purchased. The organ was rebuilt and moved to the new church in 1954. The interior of the church was remodelled and redecorated and a new altar cross, candlesticks and vases were purchased in 1944. In 1944, the row of houses on Lyon Street were sold and the debt was discharged. The congregation was growing and the church building was too small. In November, 1948 a site at Sparks and Bay Street was purchased. In 1951, the buildings on the site were demolished to make room for the new church.

The present building was dedicated in 1954. designed in traditional Gothic style, the architect was Cecil Burgess. The sandstone was cut from the same quarry as stone used for the Parliament buildings. On July 6, 1952 ground was broken for the new church. On October 26, 1952 the cornerstone was laid.

In February 1954, the altar cross by Sven Arne Gillgren (1913–1992) was gift from Sweden. On March 28, 1954 the new church and parish hall were dedicated. Governor General Vincent Massey read the lesson. On September 26, 1954 the St. Peter's service was televised by the CBC network originates. It was the first Lutheran service telecast in the Dominion of Canada and the first service telecast in Ottawa. On June 26, 1955 the choir pews, which were donated by the Hon. Senator John J. McKinley, were dedicated in commemoration of the birth of Lutheranism in Canada. In 1958, the buildings at the front of the church were demolished to make room for the Garden of the Provinces, which was opened in September, 1962.

In 1963, after fire at 403 Queen Street, caused extensive damage, the Church building was torn down the site was used for parking. In 1967 a bell carillon was installed by the congregation as a Centennial Project in memory of members whose faithfulness and sacrifice made the present church possible. In February 1968, six stonemasons and labourers from the congregation extended the tower by 11 feet led by the architect Oskars Krauze. On October 27, Governor General Roland Michener attended the Reformation Service which was televised on CBC. On November 12, 1972, the mortgages on the church, parsonage and the Queen Street property were discharged.

On May 1, 1974, the church purchases 136 Bay Street, which was designated in 1979 as a Heritage Property. Costs to restore the building make restoration prohibitive. The most significant interior features are the Casavant organ, dedicated on January 30, 1977. On November 23, 1982 the Supreme Court of Canada ruled that the City of Ottawa must repeal the by-law designating 136 Bay Street as heritage and pay court costs. In January 1983, the property was demolished.

The stained-glass windows, created by Canadian artist Russell Goodman between 1985 and 1993, focus on the life of Christ and the Lutheran heritage. On May 12, 1985 the stained-glass window in the chancel was dedicated. In 1991, Danielle Dubé, St. Peter's Organist and Choir Director, organized the first Ottawa Lutheran Music and Choir Festival. In 1991 the annual "Mitten Tree", an Advent outreach project to provide warm clothing for children and adults in the Ottawa community, was installed. To assist local food banks the Congregation initiates "Tree of Life" and "Share Thanksgiving" food drives in 1992. In 1993, St. Peter's introduced a weekly prayer calendar that remembers others during Worship service.
