= St. Matthew's Anglican Church (Ottawa) =

St Matthew's Anglican Church
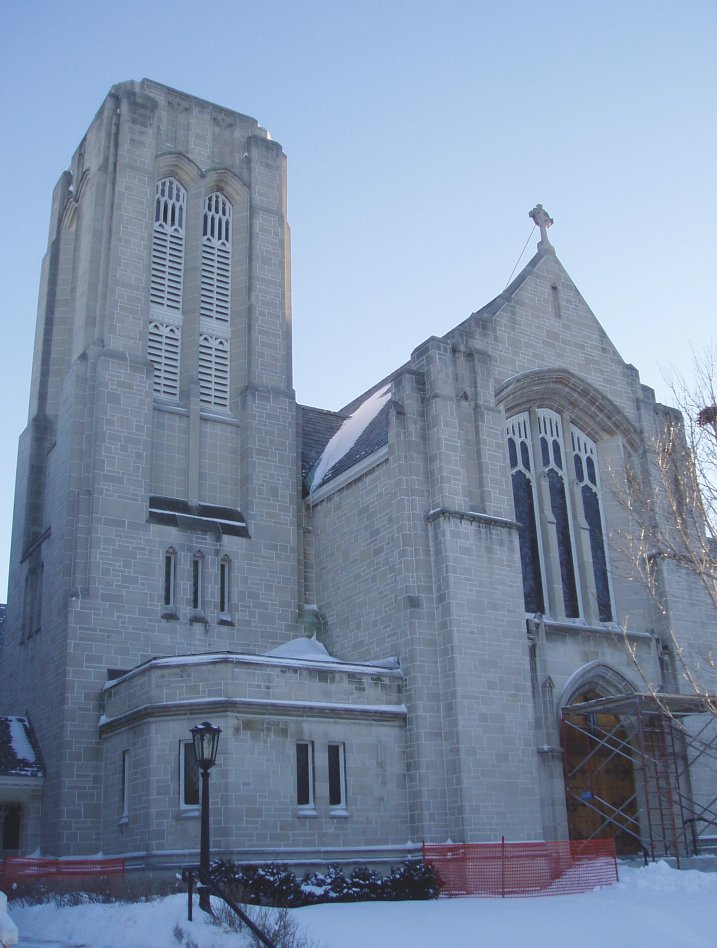
- St Matthew's Anglican Church
- 45.404385°N 75.6902°W
- Location: 217 First Avenue; Ottawa, Ontario; K1S 2G5
- Denomination: Anglican Church of Canada
- Website: www.stmatthewsottawa.ca

History
- Status: Active
- Dedication: St. Matthew
- Dedicated: December 21, 1930

Architecture
- Functional status: Active
- Architect: Cecil Burgess
- Architectural type: Modified English Gothic
- Style: orthodox cruciform plan
- Groundbreaking: May 4, 1929
- Completed: November 28, 1930
- Construction cost: $300,000

Specifications
- Materials: Limestone, slate, oak, plaster, fir, stained glass

Administration
- District: Ottawa
- Province: Ecclesiastical Province of Ontario
- Diocese: Anglican Diocese of Ottawa
- Parish: St Matthew's in the Glebe

Clergy
- Rector: The Reverend Geoffrey Chapman

St Matthew's Anglican Church is an Anglican church in the Glebe neighbourhood of Ottawa, Ontario, Canada. It was founded in 1898 and is among the oldest Anglican parishes in central Ottawa.

== History ==
=== Establishment ===
St Matthew's was established after the creation of the Diocese of Ottawa. From 1910 to 1945, St Matthew's was the largest parish in the Diocese.

=== First Avenue Church ===
The first building on First Avenue, immediately west of Bank Street, which was of frame construction, was opened on July 17, 1888.

The original building on First Avenue at Bank Street was a wooden structure designed in 1898 by noted architect John William Hurrell Watts. Two new transepts were added by Watts in 1903.

"Rev. J. A. Tancock", the first rector served from February 1888 until he resigned on August 1, 1901. "Rev. Robert W. Samwell" (1864-1901) was transferred from the parish of Wales, on the St. Lawrence, near Cornwall before being appointed second rector at St Matthew's from 1901 until his illness of typhoid fever and pneumonia which had lasted over fifteen weeks until his death on August 24, 1902. During his illness the parish was in the hands of a divinity student C. Franklin Clarke.

The church was enlarged and dedicated on July 17, 1903, by the erection of a transepts five years after the first services were held. It was reopened on September 22, 1903. This enlargement was not sufficient to cope with the ever-growing congregation, which by 1908 numbered 1984. Steps were taken to more than double the size of the church. The building was enlarged by a second transept opened on September 22, 1908, with a seating capacity of 700.

The electropneumatic Casavant Frères Opus 376 organ was dedicated on November 11, 1908. In 1931, Casavant Frères enlarged and moved it into the new church and enlarged. It In 1957, the English firm of Hill, Norman and Beard enlarged it further. In 2005, Les Orgues Baumgarten restored it, adding en chamade Trumpets.

The Rev. Edward A. Baker was appointed the first curate from June 1, 1911, until he resigned in 1914. The Rev. White Burton Morgan was appointed curate from May 1, 1914, until October 21, 1914, when he resigned to become rector and curate at St. Martin's and St. Stephen's in Ottawa. *Rev. R. C. Magee was appointed curate from November 1, 1915, until he resigned at the end of the same year.

The Rev. G. S. Anderson was appointed Rector on January 8, 1914, until he resigned on April 30, 1927.

The Right Reverend J. C. Roper, D.D., Bishop of Ottawa, unveiled a memorial tablet in January 1921 containing the names of: Harold T. Burgess, Albert E. Cuxner, Walter F. Dicks, Richard L. Downing, Horace Hunt, Thomas G. King, Raymond W. Nichols, Jukes F. Perkins, Robert Ralph, Edward Cuno McGill Richer, Maurice O. Samwell, William C. Saunders, George S. Selley, Arthur S. Sievers, Allan C. Walker and Glenholm Wilson who died in the Great War. Archbishop Hamilton and Prime Minister Arthur Meighen attended a ceremony where a plaque was "dedicated in loving memory of Sergeant Glenholme Wilson, 38th Battalion. Born Jan 18, 1894; Killed in Action Nov 18, 1916 on the Somme, France while leading his platoon on to victory after his superior officers had fallen. If I fall thank God it will be that I shall have died doing my duty."

Bishop Roper dedicated the new altar, erected by the congregation. Three windows above the altar were dedicated to the members of the church who served during the Great War. The altar was erected by Mrs. A. K. Lows in memory of her parents, Mr. and Mrs. S. Slinn; and the bishop's chair, and tablet were placed in the church by Mrs J. W. A. Kirk and family in memory of the late Mr. Kirk.

== First Avenue at Bank Street ==
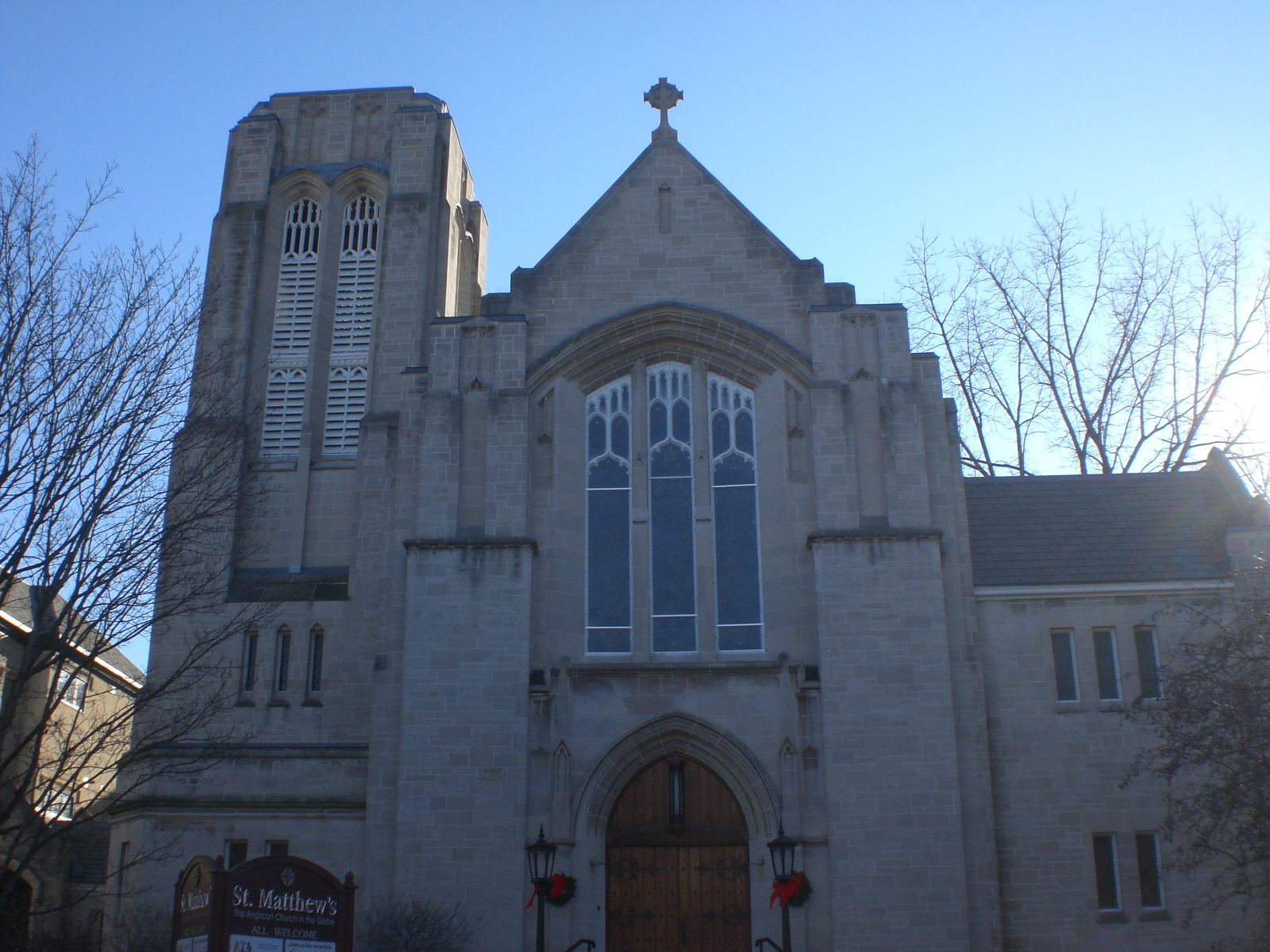
Church front

Even with several additions this structure proved too small and in the late 1920s a fundraising effort to build the new church was launched. The church edifice in which the congregation worshipped for more than 30 years accommodation for about 100 worshippers. In 1928, Frank H. Plant, who had been a member of the church since his boyhood, offered to give $133,000 towards the building of a new church. Work on a new church on First Avenue at Bank Street costing some $300,000 began in 1928. Cecil Burgess, an old St Matthews member; was chosen architect for the complex of three interconnected buildings clad in Indiana limestone: Church, Chapel and Parish Hall. The sod was turned by Bishop John Charles Roper on May 4, 1928. On July 6 of 1929, Bishop John Charles Roper laid the foundation stone at the eastern end of the church in the presence of a large assembly of clergy .

The church held fundraisers including an annual two-day Bazar opened by Bishop of Ottawa in November 21–22, 1928. The work on the new church was only half-finished when the stock market collapsed in 1929 and the sources of funding dried up. St. Matthew's Anglican Church was constructed during the Great Depression between 1929 and 1930. The church was forced to go deeply into debt to complete the structure, a debt that was not paid off until 1962.

The parish hall, which was opened on November 28, 1930, was renamed Jefferson Hall in 1954. Parr. W. Larkin, former rector at Montague Ont, was appointed curate in 1930. His Lordship, Rt. Rev. John Charles Roper, Bishop of Ottawa opened and dedicated the new St. Matthew's on December 21, 1930. The Governor General and the Viscountess Willingdon attended the first services commencing at 11 o'clock. Bishop Roper was assisted by Rev. Archdeacon C. O. Carson, of Morrisburg, and the Rural Dean of Ottawa, Rev. Robert I. Turley, of Holy Trinity Church, Ottawa South. A number of clergy, including former rector of St Matthews Church, were invited to attend the dedication. The preacher was Canon Walter Loucks, then rector of Holy Trinity, Toronto. Rev. Canon Robert Jefferson. B.A., B.D., was appointed in May 1930. Parr. W. Larkin, former rector of Montague Ont, was appointed curate in 1930.

The service of dedication was broadcast for the benefit of those members of the congregation prevented through sickness or other infirmity from attending. Subsequently, services were occasionally broadcast.

The church was immediately north of the edifice in which the congregation had worshipped since July, 1888. The intention was to demolish the initial building sometime in the future and to level the site.

British Empire Economic Conference delegates attended services at St. Matthew's Anglican Church (Ottawa) 7/26/1932.

A stained glass window by William Thomas Powis at Colonial Art Glass depicting a Jesus as a young boy, Joseph as a carpenter and Mary as a weaver dedicated "to the glory of God and in loving memory of Bessie Frances Margaret Harton, was erected by her husband and daughter A.D 1938".

"Rev. W. H. Bradley" was appointed curate in 1941. "Rev. Gilbert Alexis Brunet" served as rector of St. Matthew's parish from January 1940 until he was appointed a Canon of the Cathedral in January 1942.

Jesus "Feeding the Multitude" (1935) by Robert McCausland Limited is a stained glass window dedicated "to the Glory of God and in loving memory of E. May Nicholas, beloved wife of George Albert Clark who died 14th December 1952, which was erected by her husband and her children Catherine and George."

The Bishop of Ottawa, the Right Rev. Robert Jefferson dedicated 'The crown of life' (1945) stained glass window by Colonial Art Glass to Lieut. Harold C Fisher, who died in World War II. The window depicts the figure of a youthful soldier in medieval costume kneeling at the feet of a male Angel, resting his sword, with head bent in reverence and humility in the presence of a female Angel who holds the Crown of Life. The window bears the inscription: "Be thou faithful unto death, and I will give to thee the Crown of Life" [Revelation 2:10] "In loving memory of Lieut. Harold C. Fisher, aged 27 years, Killed in Action in Holland Oct 9th 1944. Erected by his parents & his wife."

In April 1955, St Matthew's auxiliary held a spring tea in Jefferson Hall

Before becoming the Seventh Bishop of Ottawa in 1993–1999, the Right Rev. John Baycroft had been assistant rector at St Matthew's Church, Ottawa. Before becoming the Eighth bishop of Ottawa 1999–2007, Rt Rev Peter Coffin served as an assistant curate at St. Matthew's Church.

Extensive restoration work by Robertson Martin Architects, received an Ottawa Architectural Conservation Certificate of Merit. The church is known for musical excellence, with several notable boy choristers, such as Gerald Finley, Daniel Taylor and Matthew White, who have achieved international acclaim.

== Music ==
Matthew's has an active music program with an adult satb choir and a children's choir. The choir sings from September to mid June with evensong the first Sunday of each month. Special services include Advent Lessons and Carols and Nine Lessons and Carols as well as concerts. Past music directors include Gerald Wheeler (1957–65), Brian Law (1966–79) Richard Dacey (1980–87), Andrew Teague (1990-94), Matthew Larkin (1995-2002), Christopher Argent (2003-2004), and Stephen Candow (2005-2011). The church is also a concert venue for many local choir concerts, and the Ottawa Chamber Music Festival. St. Matthew's has produced four CDs: The Newborn King (July 2010); 50th Anniversary Concert (September 26, 2007); The Truth from Above (1999); and a History of Music at St. Matthew's (1966-1979, released 1997)

== Clergy ==
=== Rectors ===
- Rev. J. A. Tancock 1888–1901
- Rev. Robert W. Samwell (1864–1901) 1901–1902.
- Rev. Canon Walter Muckleston Loucks, B.A. M.A. 1902–1913
- Rev. G. S. Anderson 1914–1927
- Rev. R. J. Turley 1922–1823
- Rev. Canon Robert Jefferson. B.A. B.D. 1927–.
- Rev. Gilbert Alexis Brunet 1940–1942
- Rev. Robert Eric Osborne 1951–1972
- Rev. Ian Keith Calder 1973–1988, established Harmony House, a domestic violence shelter, in 1987,
- Rev. Désirée Stedman 1998–2006
- Rev. Pat Johnson 2006–2014

- Rev. Gregor Sneddon 2016–2020
- Rev. Geoff Chapman 2020–present

=== Curates ===
- Rev. Edward A. Baker 1911–1914.
- Rev. W.B. Morgan 1914-1914
- Rev. R.C. Magee 1915–1915
- Rev. Gerald C. Clark 1918–1920
- Rev. Earl Ryder 1920–1925
- Rev. Frank Taylor 1925–1927
- Rev. Alan Gardner 1927–1930
- Parr. W. Larkin 1930–.
- Rev. W. H. Bradley 1941–
- Rev. Alan Gallichan 1969-1971
- Rev. Peter Coffin 1971-1973
- Rev. Paul Blunt 1973-1975
- Rev. Roger Young 1975-1977
- Rev. John Bridges 1985–7
