= Windsor Arms Apartments =

The Windsor Arms Apartments
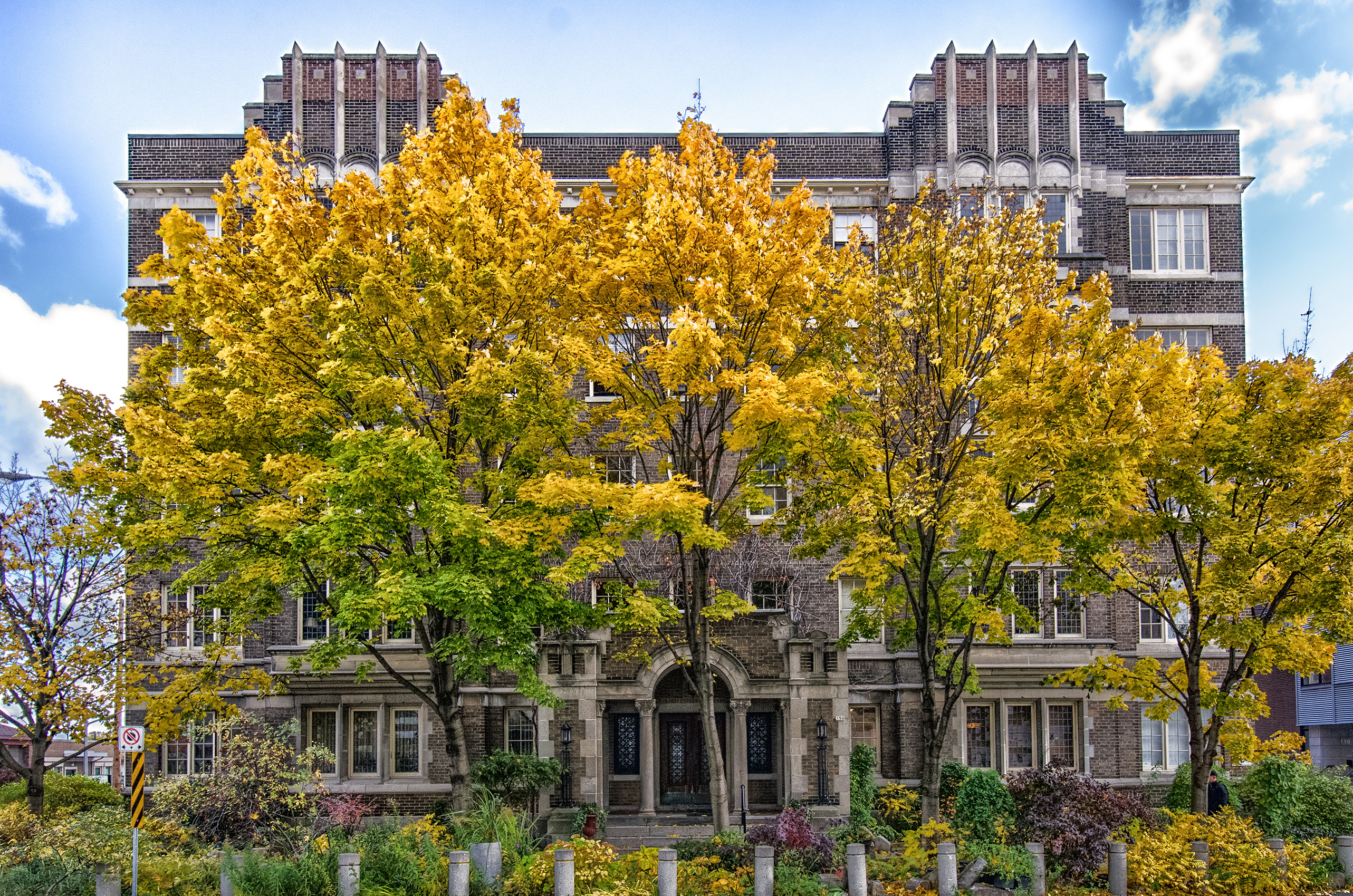
- Primary elevation of The Windsor Arms Apartments
- Interactive map of the The Windsor Arms Apartments area

General information
- Type: Apartment building
- Architectural style: Art Deco (Stripped Classicism)
- Location: Centretown, Ottawa, Ontario, 150 Argyle Avenue
- Coordinates: 45°24′43″N 75°41′18″W
- Construction started: 1929
- Completed: 1930
- Cost: $300,000 (1930)

Technical details
- Floor count: 5

Design and construction
- Architect: Cecil Burgess

The Windsor Arms Apartments is an historic five-storey, 42-unit apartment building located at 150 Argyle Avenue in Ottawa, Ontario.

== History ==
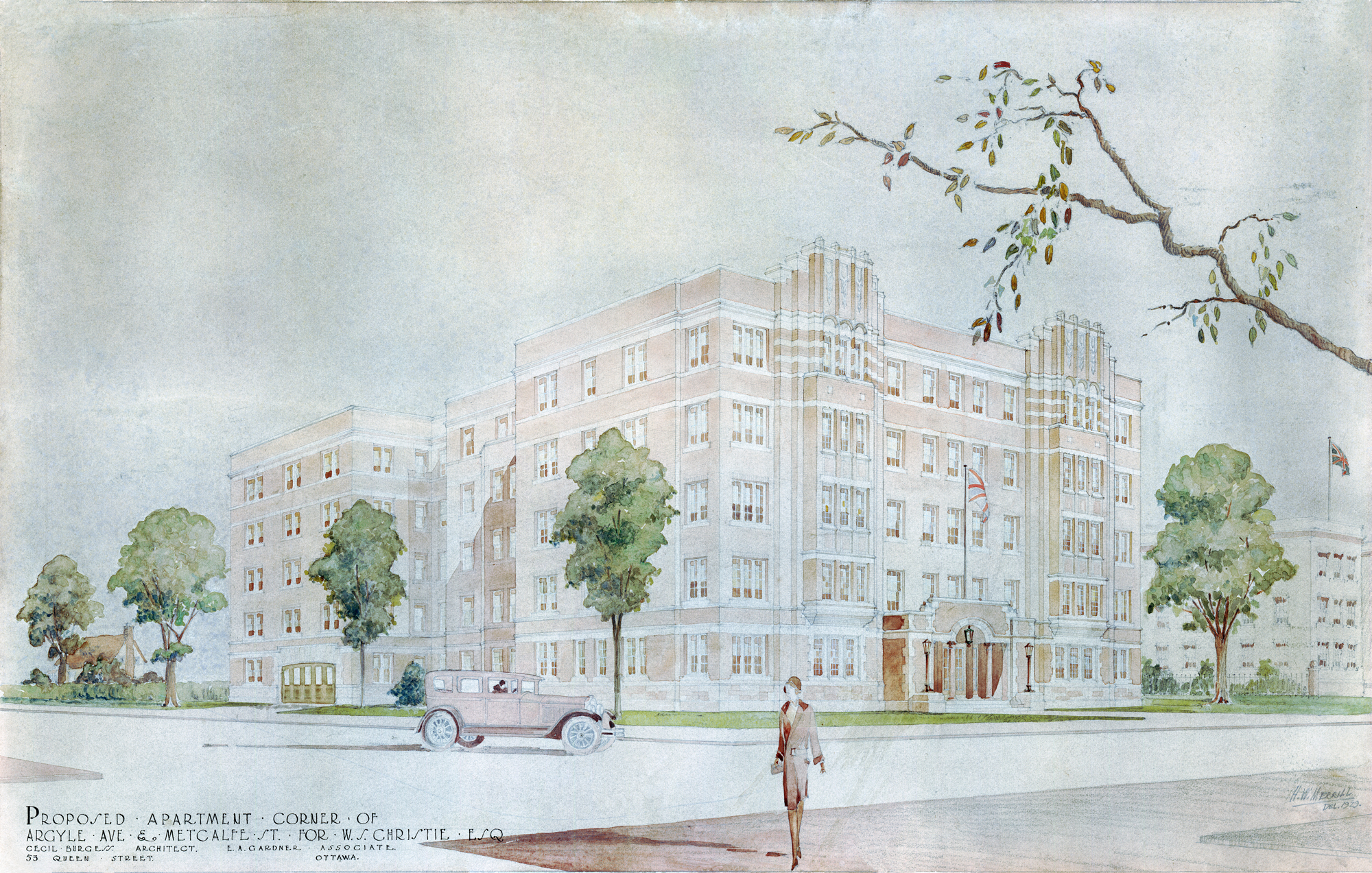
Reproduction of original 1929 artist rendering of The Windsor Arms Apartments

The Windsor Arms Apartments, designed by architect Cecil Burgess, was completed on April 1, 1930, at a cost of $300,000 (in 1930 dollars). The builder claimed this cost to be 85% above the average cost of construction because of conveniences incorporated into the structure. The building's design features a detailed entrance portico, stained and leaded glass windows, and wood-burning fireplaces in some units. Upon its initial occupancy, the building offered lobby and parking attendants, as well as maid services.

In June 1984, the then landlord informed tenants that the building would be sold for conversion into a form of condominium. Under this plan, purchasers would buy units as tenants-in-common, meaning each owner would have a stake in the property without owning a specific part of the building. This approach bypassed a municipal by-law that prevented apartment-condominium conversions at the time. However, in November of the same year, tenants successfully resisted the conversion scheme. The owner at the time confirmed that the condo development deal was "up the flue", stating it would be more profitable to convert the ground floor units into offices instead. The current property management, Andrex Holdings, has returned all units to residential occupancy.

== Designation & Restoration ==
The building is a designated Category 1 heritage building within the Centretown Heritage Conservation District. In 2009, the City of Ottawa awarded a 'Certificate of Merit – Restoration' to Keystone Traditional Masonry Inc. and Andrex Holdings Ltd. for the rebuilding of the staggered brick and stone parapets.
