= John Covert Boyd =

American military surgeon (1850-1927)

- Born: December 24, 1850; Lee County, South Carolina, US
- Died: July 7, 1927 (aged 76); London, England
- Resting place: Arlington National Cemetery
- Education: University of Virginia; University of the City of New York
- Occupations: Naval surgeon, Medical director
- Known for: founding the Kappa Sigma fraternity

John Covert Boyd (December 24, 1850 – July 7, 1927) was a surgeon and medical director in the United States Navy Medical Corps. He was one of the founders of the Kappa Sigma fraternity.

== Early life ==
John Covert Boyd was born on December 24, 1850, near Bradford Springs in Lee County, South Carolina. His father was William Simms Boyd, who was a graduate of South Carolina Medical College and his mother was Laura Nelson (Covert) Boyd. Boyd's early education was at private schools in Charleston, South Carolina.

Plaque at the University of Virginia honoring his founding of Kappa Sigma

From 1869 to 1871, he attended the University of Virginia. While there, he founded the Kappa Sigma fraternity with four other friends on December 10, 1869. After Boyd's second year, he transferred to the medical program at the University of the City of New York, graduating with a Doctor of Medicine in 1872.

== Career ==
Boyd was appointed as an assistant surgeon in the Navy Medical Corps, eventually rising to Medical Director. In 1902, he became a professor in the Navy Medical College, Washington, where he was second in seniority. Under the supervision of the Surgeon-General of the Navy, Boyd compiled a book of instructions for medical officers.

In 1903, Boyd became the assistant chief of the Navy's Bureau of Surgery and Medicine, serving in this capacity until his retirement. He retired as captain from the Navy Medical Corps on June 11, 1911.

Boyd was a fellow of the New York Academy of Medicine. He was a member of the Association of Military Surgeons of the United States, the American Medical Association, and the Philadelphia Academy of Natural Sciences. He was also an honorary member of the Medical Society of the District of Columbia.

== Personal life ==
In 1887, Boyd married Katherine Dorr Willard. The couple had two children, Alice and Walter. They resided in Washington, D. C.

He was a member of the Archaeological Institute of America. He served on the board of directors of the Garfield Hospital and the American Security and Trust Company. In 1905, President Roosevelt appointed Boyd to the central committee of the American National Red Cross.

In 1925, Boyd's health declined. Boyd died from a heart attack on July 7, 1927 at the Hyde Park Hotel in London, England. He was buried in Arlington National Cemetery.
