= Britannia United Church =

Coordinates: 45°21′14″N 75°47′32″W

Britannia United Church (Ottawa)
- Britannia United Church 1925-current
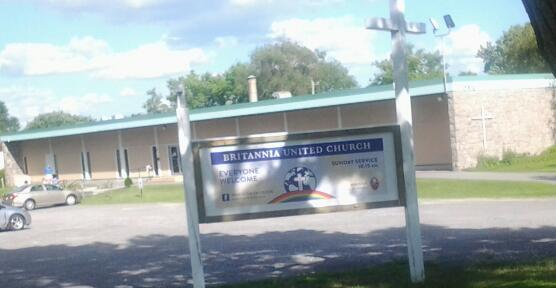
- Britannia United Church 2013
- Britannia United Church (Ottawa)
- Location: 985 Pinecrest Road; Ottawa, Ontario; K2B 6B4
- Denomination: United Church of Canada
- Previous denomination: Methodist,
- Churchmanship: Protestant
- Website: www.britanniaunitedchurch.ca

History
- Former name: Britannia Methodist Church 1869-1925
- Status: Active
- Dedicated: Christian Education Building November 24, 1961; Arkell wing June 10, 1976

Architecture
- Functional status: Active
- Architect(s): Burgess, McLean and MacPhadyen
- Architectural type: Modern
- Style: church hall & academic complex in the 1960s
- Groundbreaking: Christian Education Building April 24, 1961; Arkell wing - June 10, 1976
- Construction cost: $120,000 (1961)

Specifications
- Materials: Stone, Bituminous Built-up roof, concrete and wood

Administration
- Division: part of a three point charge including Britannia, Bell's Corners and Fallowfield
- District: Ottawa West
- Province: Ontario
- Parish: Britannia

Britannia United Church is a United Church of Canada congregation in Ottawa, Ontario, Canada. One of Ottawa's oldest congregations, members had been meeting in homes since 1869. The Britannia Heights Methodist Church formed in 1873. It joined the United Church when it was formed in 1925. In 1925, Britannia became officially Britannia United Church. The Britannia United Church has operated out of Pinecrest Road location since 1961.

== Social action ==
The purpose of Britannia United Church is to promote religion and attempt to relieve the effects of poverty and distress in western Ottawa and neighbouring communities. The congregation provides support and counselling in crisis and emergency (e.g., sickness, poverty, death, distress), chaplaincy functions, pastoral care, religious education, worship, family counselling and community outreach. The congregation donates funds to denomination headquarters in support of national and international Mission and Service activities and donates funds to a local community chaplaincy association, which provides outreach services direct to area residents. In addition, the congregation provides support directly to local food banks. Britannia United Church conducts regular discussion groups and seminars focusing on religious education and exploration. Britannia United Church is a part of Ottawa West-End Interfaith events and provides volunteers at the Ottawa Mission. The church publishes a newsletter four times a year as well as a Facebook page. In addition to the United Church Mission and Social program, there are special fundraising efforts for emergency relief programs.

== Architecture ==
The Ottawa architecture firm of Burgess, McLean & MacPhadyen designed Britannia United Church and Algonquin College in 1961. The original design included a fellowship hall, nursery, Christian education rooms and a modern kitchen.

The chapel is representative of church architecture in the 1960s with its daring lines, sleek mass, contrasting surfaces of brick walls, metal uprights, shingle roof, glass window walls, and laminated support beams inside. Designed as a Christian Education Building, the midcentury academic complex features open-ended blocks alternatively faced with long glass expanses in a semi-gambrel formation that make up the curtain walls and precast aggregate panels. The entrance is via a deeply recessed terrace that's overhung with small white ceramic tiles and vintage can lights. The long walls are bumped out to float over the foundation; The foundation plantings, which were added in 2013, keep the blocks from appearing stark. The architectural drawings pertaining to Burgess, McLean & MacPhadyen architectural projects 1900-1990 are in Library and Archives Canada.

== History ==
=== 1869–1873 ===
The church grew out of services held in the home of Ira Honeywell, the first settler in Nepean Township. Ira Honeywell acquired a 200-acre United Empire Loyalist grant in 1810. Bernard Hughes built a house in 1840 where the present Britannia United Church building stands.

Ministry in the Britannia area began with circuit ministers visiting with local families in 1869. The earliest Methodist Episcopal churches in the area were the Methodist Episcopal church down at the Bay, and the "Sandy Hill" church. The Methodist Episcopal church down at the Bay, united with that of the "Sandy Hill" church, as it was called in those days in the year when the first of the Methodist churches of Canada was consummated.

The early members included Mr. John Bell, Mr. William Graham, Mr. Ira Honeywell (founder of Carleton County, Ontario), Mr. James Bearman (Reeve of Nepean Township, Ontario), Mrs. Albert Shouldics, Mr. Robert Honeywell and Mr. Albert Hare. The church originally formed a part of the Nepean circuit. Britannia was originally part of a three-point Methodist charge which included Cityview and Westboro.

==== Parsonage ====
In the minutes of 1873 there was a report on the building committee for the parsonage, which was built on Pinecrest Rd. opposite the Forge. Britannia United Church sold the parsonage on Pinecrest Rd. opposite the Forge in the mid-1970s. It still stands in 2014, and remains a private residence. In the mid-1970s, the Church purchased a Parsonage at 998 Alpine Street, near Severn School. In the mid-1980s, after the death of Reverend Myron Maxted, the Church sold the parsonage with subsequent Ministers living in private residences.

=== 1873–1925 ===
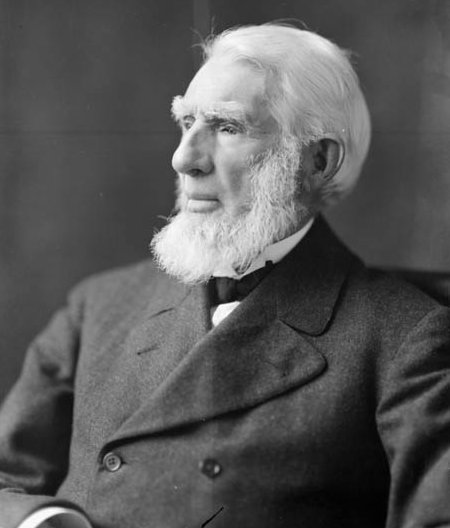
John Rudolphus Booth

In 1873, the population of Ottawa was about 23,000 people, clustered mainly in the Centretown and Lowertown areas. The Britannia Bay community was built up after 1873 when a sawmill was constructed along the waterfront. In 1873, the present site was chosen and building erected under a Trustee Board, consisting of Messrs J Edward Watson, Sr. Robert Hare, John Roberts, James Bearman, John F. Bearman and William Graham.

Contractors James and William West built the Britannia Heights Methodist Church between 1873 and 1874 on what is now Britannia Road and Carling Avenue, although interior construction continued until 1875. The Carpenter Gothic building had interior wood panelling, and the bargeboards of the roof over the front door and main building featured lacelike scrollwork. The original ceiling was made of tongue-and-groove stained wood in an ornamental design carved in rectangular shapes. Heating relied on stove and pipes, although these were later replaced with a central furnace. Although the lawn at the front entrance was small, the east lawn was large enough for the members to socialize after the services. The drive shed was on the easterly back side.

Rev. R. Short, the preacher in charge in 1874, served three congregations: Britannia, City View and Westboro. Although money was combined from the three churches to pay the preacher's $300.00 salary, it was not always met.

The first marriage at Britannia was of Barbara Hare to Rev. Foster McAmmand. Prominent members and workers were Mr. Robert Hare and Mr. Edwards. John Rudolphus Booth sold the land on the southwest corner of Richmond Road and Britannia Road in 1877 to the Britannia Methodist Church for $1.00.

In 1900, Rev Short replaced Rev H.E. Warren of Hintonburg, who had looked after both the Hintonburg and Britannia congregations.

Westboro, Britannia and City View Methodists asked for a division of Nepean circuit into two distinct circuits at the meeting of the Ottawa District Methodists in 1915. Rev Elwood Lawson, pastor of Nepean district told of the request of his three congregations to divide the Nepean Circuit into one to include Britannia and City View and the other to include Westboro alone. Owing to the congregation numbers increase, it was almost impossible for one minister to attend to the needs of the circuit. The division was recommended to the Montreal conference.

The religious activities generally were limited to Sunday worship during the 1920s and 30s since the church was heated only on Sundays or for some special event such as a Harvest dinners, Christmas Concerts, Strawberry Socials, musical concert or a funeral.

=== 1925–1961 ===
The United Church of Canada was inaugurated on June 10, 1925, in Toronto, Ontario with a mandate to be a "uniting" Church, when the Methodist Church (Canada), the Congregational Union of Canada, the Presbyterian Church in Canada, and the small General Council of Union Churches entered into union. The United Church entered into a union with The Wesleyan Methodist Church of Bermuda (1930), and Canada Conference of The Evangelical United Brethren Church (1968). In 2003, the Anglican Church of Canada and The United Church of Canada have begun an ongoing dialogue. These are the first formal conversations between the two denominations since the 1970s. Britannia Heights Methodist Church joined the United Church when it was formed in 1925 and took the name "Britannia Heights United Church"; it was part of a three-point charge that also included Bell's Corners and Fallowfield.

The church lacked a basement until one was excavated in 1924–25. Since the church lacked running water, water was carried in buckets from Judge Latchford's or the Forge and dumped into storage barrels. Since congregants came to church by horse and buggy or in winter by cutter, the church had a drive-shed which was closed in on three sides to shelter horses.

Programs similar to the Scouting movement were promoted by Canadian Protestant churches in the mid-1940s. In 1946, Trail Rangers, a club for boys 12 to 14; TUXIS a club for boys 15 to 19 and Canadian Girls in Training were founded at the Britannia Heights United Church under the leadership of Rev Gordon F. Dangerfield, minister of the Britannia-Bell's Corner's-Fallowfield, who had been active in the field of religious education.

Rev Dangerfield paid tribute during a special memorial service April 6, 1946 to 11 men of Britannia Heights United congregation, who fell during the Second World War. Their names were added to the church's honour roll. In the following year, an electric organ and a plaque were dedicated in their memory. During the post war growth period, under Rev Gordon Dangerfield, the membership of Britannia Heights United Church doubled in a year, 1947. During the post war period, Britannia Heights United Church is frequently the scene of weddings

Beginning in 1950, R.W. Armstrong led an outdoor drive-in interdenominational services for 200-300 cars, with an estimated attendance of 4-5 people per car.

In 1956 Campeau Corp, a home builder, acquired 114 acres of the Arkell farm on Pinecrest Road intending to extend the Queensview Industrial Area on the Northside of the proposed Queensway Around 1958, the city refused the church's request to expand as it intended to widen Carling Ave. In 1959, the congregation decided to move to the site on Pinecrest Road, formerly the site of the Arkell farm. In 1958, the City of Ottawa expropriated the Britannia Heights Church and rectory properties, along with the Olde Forge and other properties in the Carling area. The streets were widened in 1960.

Rev. James Perry's plans to build a new Britannia United Church were put before the United Church presbytery on April 21, 1961. The architects Burgress, McLean and MacPhadyen, prepared the plans and specifications for the modern concrete Christian Education Building. C.A. Johannsen and Sons Ltd were given the general contract for the project. The $122,000 construction cost was secured through a bank loan of $100,000 and $22,000 loan from Presbytery church extension fund. The church held land on the Pinecrest site valued at $35,000. A sanctuary structure, was planned to be built in the future.

=== 1961–present ===
Rev Perry presided over the sod turning for the new Britannia United Church on Pinecrest Road, the former site of the Arkell farm. The congregation moved to the present site on Pinecrest Road in November 1961. Because of the lower elevation of the newer location, the church later dropped "Heights" from its name. Now lacking a congregation, the old building was later used to sell Macintosh & Watts china, to sell paintings, and as a construction shack until it was destroyed by fire on November 4, 1975.

A library was set up in the 1960s. Members formed a travelling theatre company in the 1960s, the "Chancel Players".

In 1966, Margaret Arkell donated a house to the congregation, which named it "Arkell House" and used it as a multi-purpose centre.

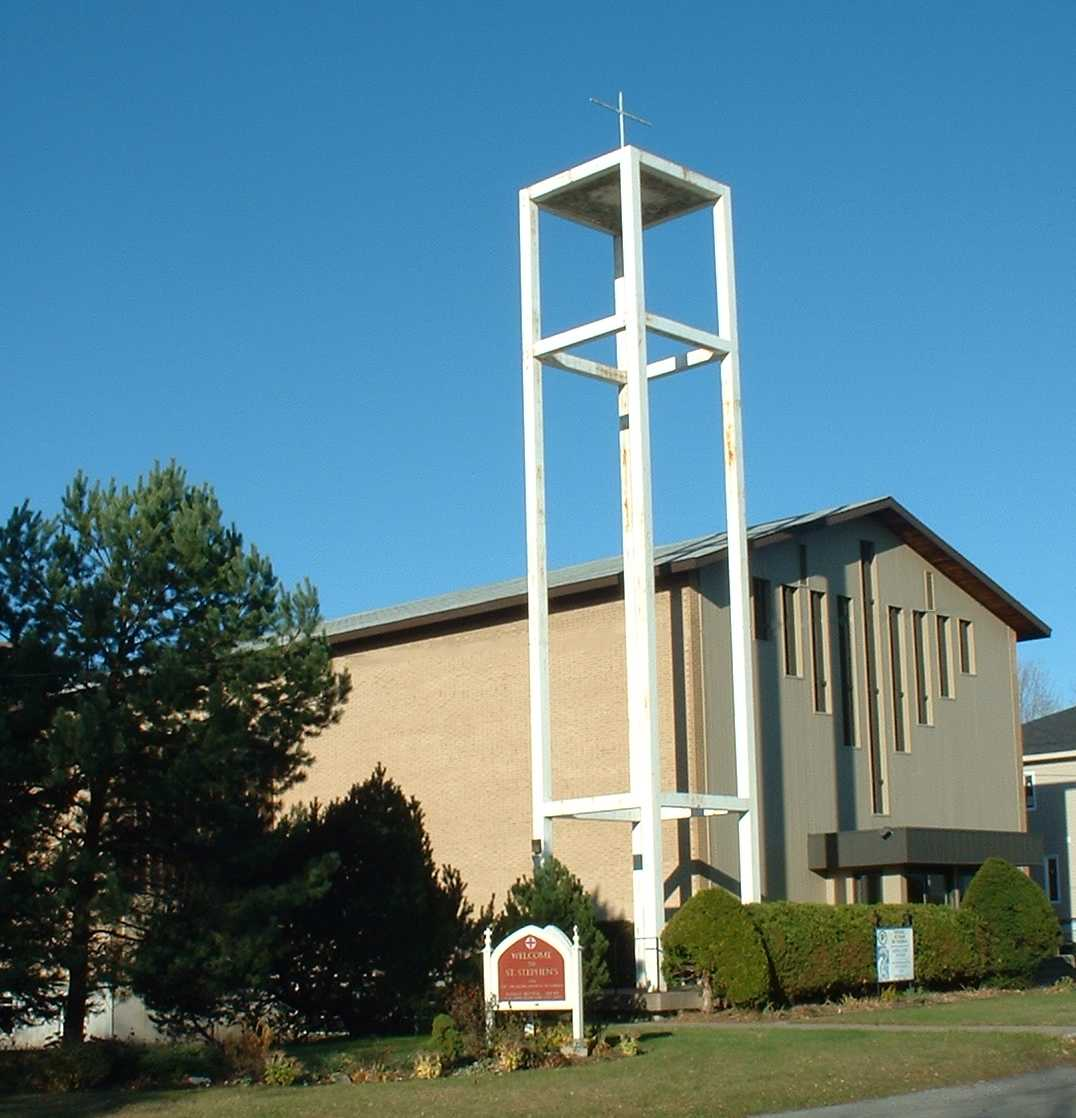
St. Stephen's Anglican Church

Talks with officials from St. Stephen's Anglican Church began in March, 1967, and its parishioners began a one-year trial of worshipping at the Britannia building in September 1968. Britannia had been holding services in its Christian Education Building, which St. Stephen's also used for Sunday school classes. With a target date of 1974 set for union between the two denominations, church officials thought the arrangement was ideal. Only two or three such arrangements had previously been made, all in Western Canada. After the Plan of Union failed, it was necessary to expand the Britannia United Church facility; funds were raised by selling church-owned land, and the Arkell House was demolished. The new wing of the church building, named for the Arkells, was dedicated in 1976.

==== Inclusivity and social activism ====
Heralding the many changes aimed at inclusivity that were to follow, the Britannia United Church was made fully wheelchair accessible in 1977.

In 1979, Britannia United Church sponsored two Vietnamese refugee families as part of Project 5000.

In 1982, Rev. Myron Maxted of Britannia United Church made a stand fighting poverty and in support of controversial subsidized housing in the Britannia Heights area.

In 2022, Rev. Jim Baldwin retired, he was known for playing the pirate Peter Easton in 'The Princess and the Pirate', Oct. 16. 2002 and Capt Von Trapp in the 'Sound of Music' June 6–14, 2008 at Centrepointe Theatre in Ottawa. Also, Rev. Baldwin sung gospel and performed with the Savoy Society.

As of 2022, Rev. Jenn Power continues the tradition of First United as one that welcomes diversity and makes it a centre of social activism, especially gay rights, fighting poverty, and supporting people with addictions. As well, its welcome for the diversity of life has drawn many people to the church. Britannia United has been an 'Affirming Congregation' Affirm United of the United Church of Canada for several years.

After Ontario created same-sex marriage in 2003, Britannia United Church hosted one of the first same-sex weddings in Canada.

Since 2005, the academic complex has been used by MindWare Academy, a school for the learning disabled.

=== Records ===
Records of the Ontario congregations of the Ottawa Presbytery are housed at the City of Ottawa Archives in Ottawa, Ontario. The Britannia United Church's Marriage Registers (1925-1985), Baptism Registers (1925-1973) and Burial Registers (1926-1990) have been deposited in the Montreal & Ottawa Conference collection under Ottawa Presbytery Ontario Congregation Archives. The records are listed under 9/BCR Bells Corners Pastoral Charge and under 9/BRI Britannia United Church (Ottawa).

== Britannia Church ministers ==
| Year | Minister |
| 1869–1871 | J. L. Rose |
| 1871–1875 | R. Short |
| 1875–1876 | J. Anderson |
| 1876–1877 | J. W. Andrews |
| 1877–1879 | E. S. Howard |
| 1879–1881 | S. A. Dupreau |
| 1881–1882 | D. Hoag & W. Saunders |
| 1882–1885 | E. Woodcock |
| 1885–1893 | Rev. Philips; Rev. Quinn; Rev. Jamison; F. Tripp |
| 1893-4 | Rev. Ernest Tripp |
| 1898–1901 | R. L. Oliver |
| 1901–1903 | John Gibson & Rev. Warren |
| 1903–1904 | W. Short & Ernest Thomas |
| 1904–1906 | C. L. Curtis |
| 1906–1910 | H. E. Young |
| 1910–1914 | H. E. Warren & Rev. Sully - assistant |
| 1914–1915 | Elwood Lawson & Mr. Kerslake - assistant |
| 1915–1916 | Rev. Arthur Hopper |
| 1916–1919 | Rev. W. S. Jamison |
| 1919–1920 | Rev. Phillip |
| 1920–1924 | Rev. J. Kerslake |
| 1924–1925 | Rev. J. Clark Riley |
| 1925 | Rev. John Webster & Rev. Dr. L. S. Hughson |
| 1941–1949 | Rev. Gordon Dangerfield |
| 1949–1958 | Rev. R. W. Armstrong |
| 1958–1963 | Rev. James M. Perry |
| 1963–1967 | Rev. John Wayling |
| 1967–1970 | Rev. Douglas C. Lapp |
| 1970–1974 | Rev. James Hendry |
| 1974–1980 | Rev. Barry Thomas |
| 1980–1997 | Rev. Myron Maxted, Ottawa Police Padre, died in office |
| 1997–2000 | Rev. Camille Lipsett |
| 2000–2022 | Rev. Jim Baldwin |
| 2022–2025 | Rev. Jennifer Power |
| 2025– | Rev. Dr. Frank Emanuel |

== Other readings ==
- Don Schweitzer, ed. "The United Church of Canada: A History." Wilfrid Laurier University Press, 2012. ISBN 978-1-55458-331-7, electronic format ISBN 978-1-55458-376-8 and ISBN 978-1-55458-419-2
