= John Watts (military architect) =

Irish military officer and architect

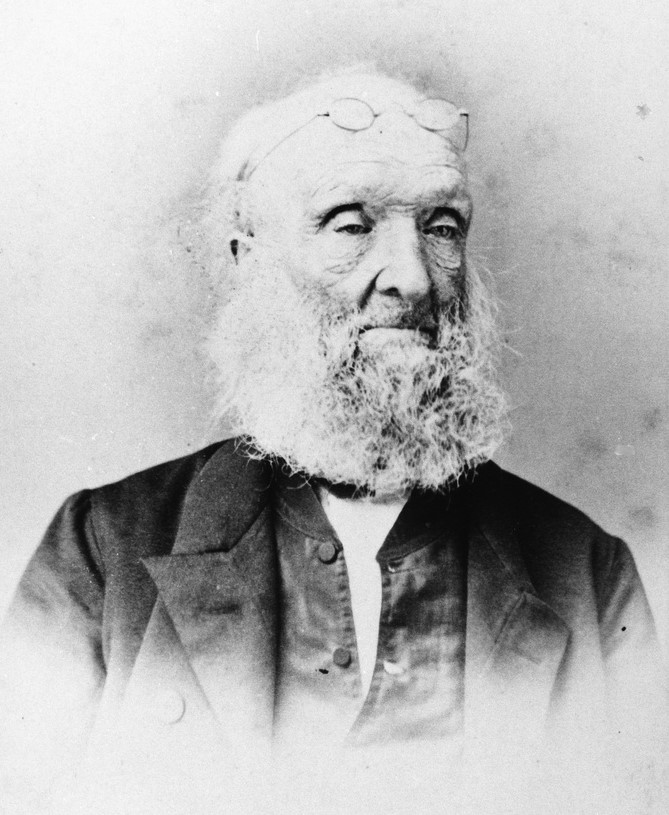

John Cliffe Watts (7 May 1786 – 28 March 1873) was an Irish military officer and architect who designed some of the first permanent public buildings in the young British colony of New South Wales, and who also later became Postmaster General in South Australia, where he was commonly referred to as "Captain Watts".

== Early life ==
Watts was born in the village of Sallins, County Kildare Ireland to Charles Watts and his wife Margaret (née Boyse). He had seven brothers who, like him, all joined the army as commissioned officers; five of them (including him) reached the rank of captain. His education was completed by 1802, and thereafter he worked for a short time at a bank in Dublin, and then in a firm of architects for approximately 18 months.

== Military commission ==
On 24 July 1804 he was commissioned into the army as an ensign in the 64th Regiment of Foot, which was at that time stationed in the West Indies. In 1805 he was promoted to the rank of lieutenant, and transferred to the 46th Regiment. During January and February 1810 he was involved in the action which, on 4 February 1810, took the island of Guadeloupe from the French. He returned to England with the 46th Regiment in 1811, where they were assigned garrison duty on Jersey until 16 June 1812; they were then on duty on the Isle of Wight until August 1813.

== New South Wales ==
=== Aide-de-camp ===
In August 1813 the 46th Regiment was ordered to proceed to the colony of New South Wales to relieve the 73rd Regiment of Foot which, under the leadership of Major-General Lachlan Macquarie, had forcibly deported their predecessors, the corrupt New South Wales Corps. The 46th Regiment travelled in three ships, Windham and General Hewitt, departing England on 23 August 1813, and followed three months later by Three Bees. Watts travelled on Windham, and arrived in Sydney on 11 February 1814. On 3 June 1814 he was appointed aide-de-camp to the Governor of New South Wales, Lachlan Macquarie, and became a family friend to Macquarie and his wife Elizabeth. Watts supported Governor Macquarie's attempts to integrate emancipists into free society, however this was resisted by many free settlers and members of the military, including Watts' own commanding officer Colonel George Molle, of the 46th Regiment. Governor Macquarie wrote to Lord Bathurst (Secretary of State for War and the Colonies) and the Duke of York (the second son of King George III) criticising the insubordinate behaviour of the various military officers who refused to attend civil functions which were attended by emancipists. Macquarie also listed the names of loyal and well-behaved officers in his letters, which included the name of his aide-de-camp, John Watts. Watts lived with the Macquaries for five years, and was warmly regarded by them as one of the family.

=== Architect ===
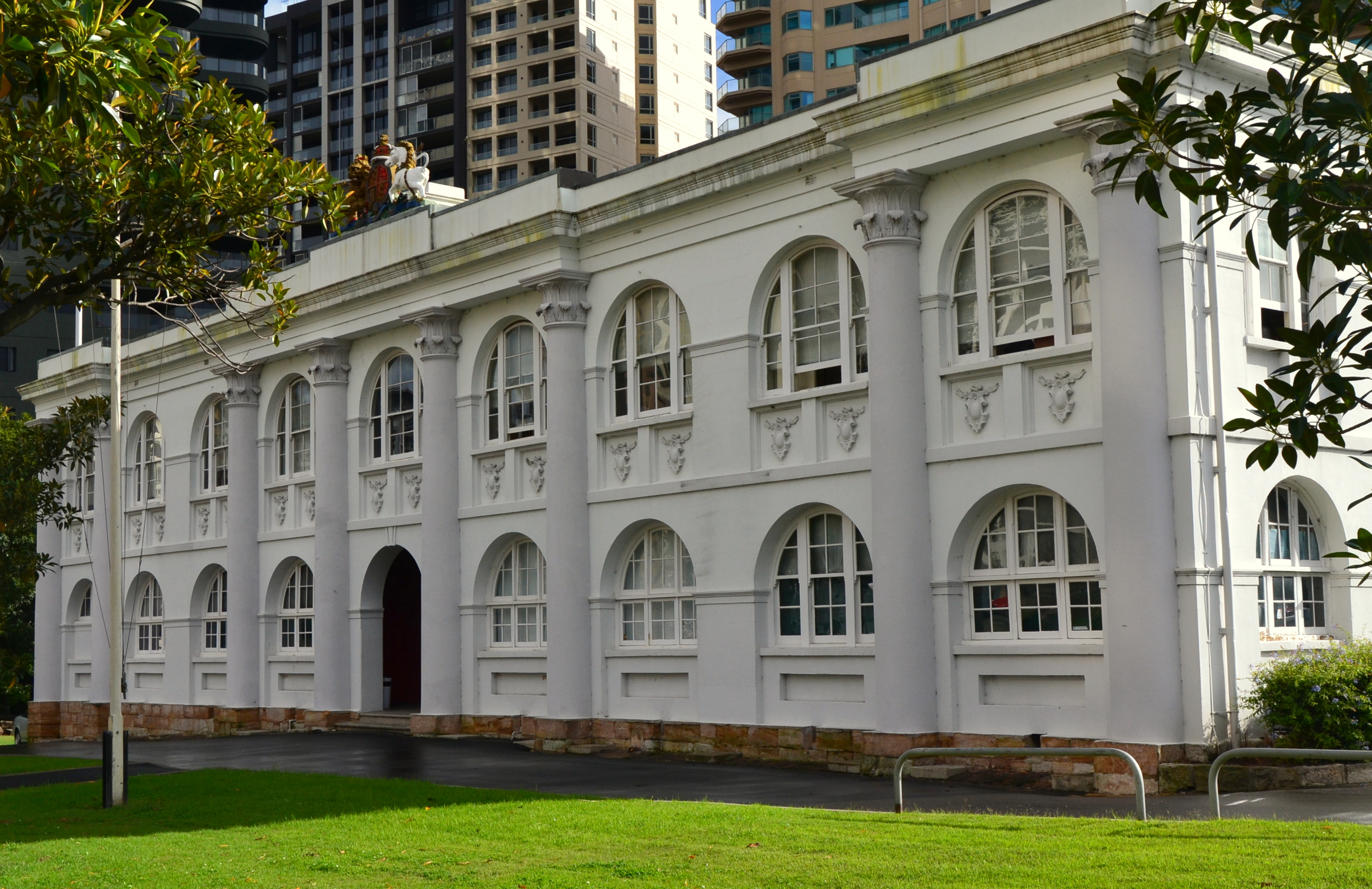
National Trust of Australia headquarters Observatory Hill, Sydney.

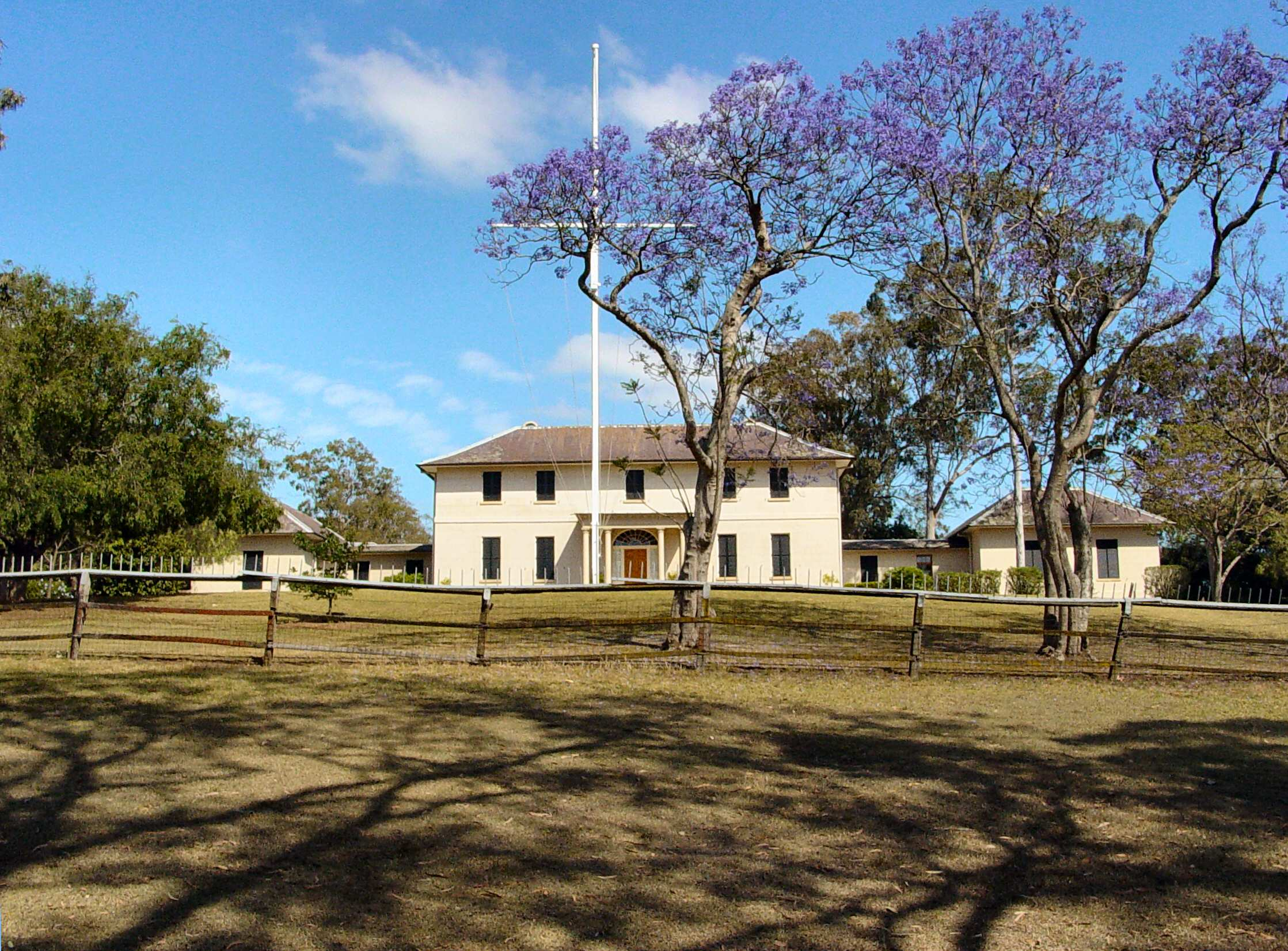
Old Government House, Parramatta.

The Governor was a prolific builder and, as the colony had a serious shortage of architects and engineers, he soon made use of Watts' architectural skills, asking him to design a new military hospital to be built on what is now called Observatory Hill in Sydney. This building later functioned as Fort Street High School from at 1849 to 1975, and today is the headquarters of the New South Wales branch of the National Trust of Australia. The inner-core of this building remains behind the later Victorian facade. Watts' successful completion of his first assignment led to more, many of which were based around the new inland settlement of Parramatta. In 1815-16 he worked on the repair and enhancement of Government House at Parramatta. He also designed a hospital at Parramatta 1817–18, a military barracks 1818-20, added two steeples to St John's Church at Parramatta 1818–19, worked on repairs to the road and bridges between Sydney and Parramatta, and the construction of a dam across the Parramatta River in 1818. Mrs Macquarie considered the improved water supply to Parramatta to be Watts' greatest achievement, as up to that time Parramatta had tended to suffer from a lack of drinking water in summer. He worked closely with Mrs Elizabeth Macquarie on the modifications to St John's Church and Government House at Parramatta, and is listed as one of those who accompanied the Macquaries on their tours to Bathurst in 1815, and to the Cowpastures area (in the vicinity of modern Camden) in the same year.

=== Departure ===
When Governor Macquarie's illegitimate nephew, the rakish Hector Macquarie arrived in New South Wales on 14 April 1818, Watts offered to relinquish his position, to allow Hector Macquarie to become the Governor's new aide-de-camp. This offer was rejected by Lachlan Macquarie, who encouraged Watts to write to England to seek promotion. After eight months with no reply, Watts resigned as aide-de-camp, and the Governor granted his request for a two-year leave of absence from his regiment and duty, so that he could travel to England to follow up on his letter. The Governor publicly gave Watts his "best thanks" for his "architectural services and Taste", in an announcement in the Sydney Gazette, published on 2 January 1819. After putting in some hurried work on the Parramatta military barracks, which were still under construction, Watts sailed for England on 1 April 1819, on the transport ship Shipley. Macquarie gave him official despatches to deliver, as well as various personal presents for certain members of the Royal Family and also the Secretary of State, Lord Bathurst.

== Britain ==
After his arrival in Britain, Watts was promoted to the rank of captain in Macquarie's old regiment, the 73rd Foot, on 24 February 1820. At that time the regiment was stationed in Ceylon, and not due to return to England until the following year. What he did during this period is unknown. In 1822, Governor Macquarie returned from Australia and, after securing seven weeks' leave from his returned regiment, Watts went to visit the Macquaries, meeting them in Glasgow on 2 September 1822. During his stay in Scotland, Watts fell in love with Elizabeth Macquarie's niece, Jane Campbell, and made a proposal of marriage. They were married on 16 January 1823, although the Macquaries were away on an eight-month tour of Europe at the time. Watts resigned his commission in the army in 1824, and settled down to married life in Campbeltown, Scotland, where he and his wife Jane raised a family of seven children. During this thirteen-year period, he made periodic trips to visit his parents living in Dublin, and eventually moved his family there in 1837. In 1834, while still living in Campbeltown, he sought an official position in Van Diemen's Land and wrote to Elizabeth Macquarie, asking if she would write a letter to the Home Secretary Henry Goulburn in support of his request. Although she did assist Watts, he was unsuccessful.

=== South Australia ===
In 1840, Watts decided to emigrate to the colony of South Australia, where his brother Henry was Postmaster General. He and his family left the port of Greenock Scotland, on 17 September 1840 on the ship John Cooper. They arrived in Port Adelaide, South Australia, on 8 March 1841. He was appointed Postmaster General for South Australia on 1 April 1841 in his brother's place, and held the position for 20 years. They lived at the corner of King William Street and North Terrace, later the site of the Bank of New South Wales. He was one of the original trustees of the Savings Bank of South Australia. Their eldest daughter, Margaret Elizabeth, married Charles Hervey Bagot's son Christopher; their son, John Bagot, married Lucy Ayers, daughter of Sir Henry. Their youngest daughter, Jane, married B. T. Solly, Private Secretary to the Governor of Tasmania. He retired on 29 June 1861 and was succeeded by James William Lewis, then in 1870 the Post Office was amalgamated with the Telegraph Office and Charles Todd was appointed as its head. He was an active member of the Aborigines' Friends' Association. Captain Watts died at the Bagot home "Nurney House" between Kingston Terrace and Stanley Street, North Adelaide in 1873, aged almost 87 years.
