= John Boyd (footballer, born 1881) =

Scottish footballer

Personal information
- Full name: John Boyd
- Date of birth: 21 April 1881
- Place of birth: Galston, Scotland
- Date of death: 1927 (aged 45–46)
- Position: Wing half

Senior career*
Years	Team	Apps	(Gls)
1901–1902	Hurlford Thistle		
1902–1909	Bolton Wanderers	189	(7)
1909–1910	Plymouth Argyle	5	(0)
1910	Accrington Stanley		
Total		194	(7)
- * Club domestic league appearances and goals

John Boyd (21 April 1881 – 1927) was a Scottish footballer who played in the Football League for Bolton Wanderers.
