= John H. Boyd (photographer) =

Canadian photographer

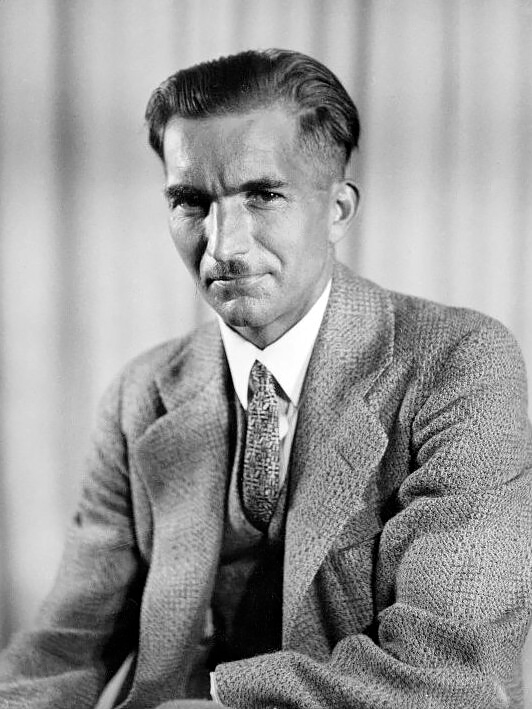
- Boyd, c. 1929
- Born: January, 1898; Toronto, Ontario
- Died: October 28, 1971 (aged 73)
- Occupation: photographer
- Known for: Chronicling early 20th century Toronto through photographs

John Harold Boyd, also referred to as John Boyd Jr. was a Canadian photographer for The Globe and Mail, based in Toronto, Ontario. He was also a founding member and early president of the Commercial and Press Photographers' Association of Canada.

Mike Filey, the author of a long-running column, in the Toronto Sun, on the history of Toronto, described Boyd as a technical innovator, who modified and tuned his cameras, which, incidentally, gave them a distinct appearance. Boyd was the first Canadian to transmit a photograph electronically. Filey described Boyd as a meticulous craftsman and record-keeper, whose logbooks donated to the City of Toronto archives, recorded the number, subject and date of over 100,000 negatives for photos he took.

== Early Training ==
John Boyd's father, John Boyd Sr. was an avid amateur photographer, who taught his son about photography beginning at an early age. Boyd Jr. then completed an apprenticeship at a commercial firm, before working as a freelance photographer for agricultural journals.

== The Globe and Mail ==
He was hired by the Globe as the newspapers first (and at that time, only) staff photographer in December 1922. Boyd Jr.'s first assignment at the Globe was photographing the streetcar tracks being laid in front of Union Station. The remained with the Globe when it merged with the Mail and Empire in 1936 to become The Globe and Mail. He remained at the Globe and Mail until his retirement in 1964.

According to Robert Landsale, as the newspaper's top photographer, Boyd Jr. covered many of the most tumultuous events in Canada's history, and was recognized as a professional who "would go to any lengths to get a shot". He was also an innovator and early adopter of evolving photographic technology. He was the first news photographer to use flashbulbs, the first to transmit a wirephoto using a portable transmitter. He was also the first news photographer to write his own captions, a skill learned from his father.
