= John Boyd (Bahamas) =

John Boyd was a free person of color in the 19th century, born on New Providence island in the Bahamas. He was self-taught with a beautiful hand writing. Governor James Carmichael-Smyth of the Bahama Islands, made him Clerk of visitors of the King's School.

Governor James Carmichael-Smyth commenting on John Boyd's beautiful penmanship told the colonial office "If your Lordship has time to look at the minutes herewith enclosed; your Lordship will not look at them with less interest for their being in the handwriting of a free black man of the name of Boyd whom I have appointed Clerk of the Visitors."

John Boyd had what may be the first book published by a native born black from the Bahama Islands in 1834 called "The Vision and Other Poems in Blank Verse."
