= John Boyd (photographer) =

Canadian photographer

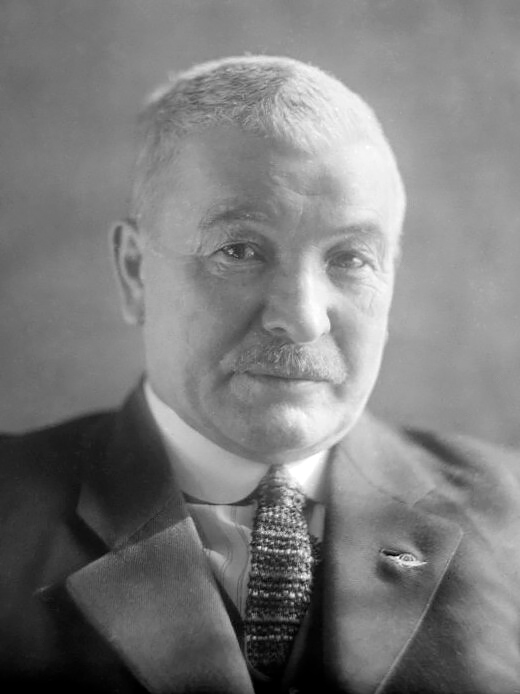
- Boyd, c. 1926
- Born: 22 December 1865; Emyvale, Ireland
- Died: 14 April 1941 (aged 75); Toronto, Ontario, Canada
- Occupation: railway employee
- Known for: Amateur photographer who documented Canada in the late 19th and early 20th century.

John Boyd, also referred to as John Boyd Sr., was a Canadian amateur photographer and railway official. He was also the father of Canadian newspaper photographer John H. Boyd.

== Personal life ==
John Boyd emigrated to Toronto, Ontario, Canada, with his family in the late 1860s. The oldest of 14 children, Boyd left school at the age of 15 in 1880, to work as a messenger at the Grand Trunk Railway's (GT) Freight Office. By 1894, he had reached the position of chief clerk. He moved to the Canadian National Railway (CN) in 1918, remaining there as a supervisor until his retirement in 1931. In his work for both the GT and CN railways, he was given the opportunity to photograph across Ontario.

== Amateur photography ==
In his work as an amateur photographer, his photographs were widely published across Canada. He also corresponded with George Eastman, founder of the Eastman Kodak Company, about photographic technology, and published in photographic journals on the subject of technological innovation. He built his first camera out of an oblong box covered in black oil cloth, and went on to design and build such items of equipment as an exposure timing chart, a lens shade, and a fixing tank.

Between August 1914 and November 1917, John Boyd took photographs of the training activities of Canadian soldiers who would soon ship out as part of the Canadian Expeditionary Force during the First World War. His photographs depict aspects of recruitment and military training such as: parade drilling, artillery exercises, signalling, trench digging, and camp life. While most of the photographs were taken in Toronto, some images were shot in Barriefield and Kingston, Camp Borden, Niagara, London, and Guelph in Ontario, and in Montreal, Quebec.

== Bibliography ==
- Desfor, Gene and Jennefer Laidley, ed. "Reshaping Toronto's Waterfront" (Toronto: University of Toronto Press, 2011).
- Koltun, Lily, ed. "Private Realms of Light: Amateur Photography in Canada: 1839-1940" (Toronto: Fitzhenry & Whiteside, 1984).
