= The Twelfth =

Ulster Protestant celebration

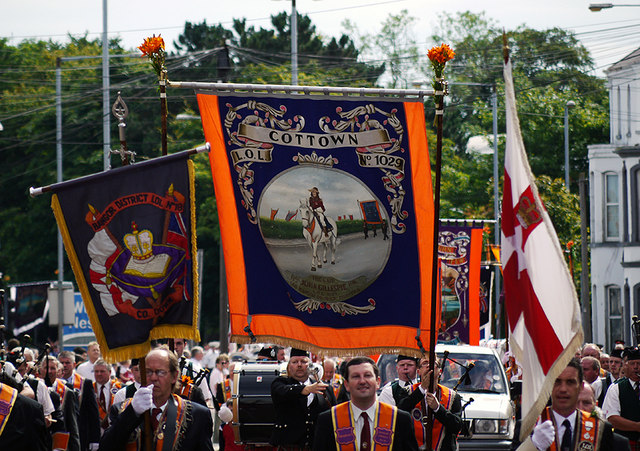
- Orangemen parading in Bangor, 12 July 2010
- Also called: Orangemen's Day
- Observed by: Orange Order, Ulster Protestants, Ulster-Scots people, Anglo-Irish people, some non-British Protestants
- Significance: Celebration of the Glorious Revolution (1688) and victory of William of Orange at the Battle of the Boyne (1690)
- Celebrations: Parading, bonfires, erecting flags and bunting
- Date: 12 July
- Frequency: Annual
- Related to: The Eleventh Night

The Twelfth (also called Orangemen's Day) is an Ulster Protestant celebration held on 12 July. It celebrates the Glorious Revolution and victory of Protestant king William of Orange over Catholic king James II at the Battle of the Boyne. On and around the Twelfth, large parades are held by the Orange Order and Ulster loyalist marching bands, streets are decorated with Union Jacks and bunting, and on the Eleventh Night large towering bonfires are lit. Today, the Twelfth is mainly celebrated in Northern Ireland, where it is a public holiday, but some celebrations are held elsewhere, such as Scotland, Canada, Australia and West Africa. It is also a public holiday in Newfoundland and Labrador.

The Twelfth began in the late 18th century in Ulster, and many Ulster Protestants see it as an important part of their culture. Some Catholics and Irish nationalists see it as anti-Catholic and supremacist. Since the beginning, it has been occasionally accompanied by sectarian violence, especially during times of political tension. Orange marches through Catholic neighbourhoods, and the burning of Irish flags on bonfires, are especially controversial. The Drumcree conflict is the most well-known dispute involving Orange marches. Sectarian violence around the Twelfth worsened during the Troubles, but today, most events pass off peacefully. Recently, there have been attempts to draw tourists to the main Twelfth parades and promote them as family-friendly events. This demand was met with the festival known as Orangefest, established in 2007. It takes place on the week leading up to the main day.

When 12 July falls on a Sunday, the parades are held instead on the next Monday, 13 July.

== Origins ==
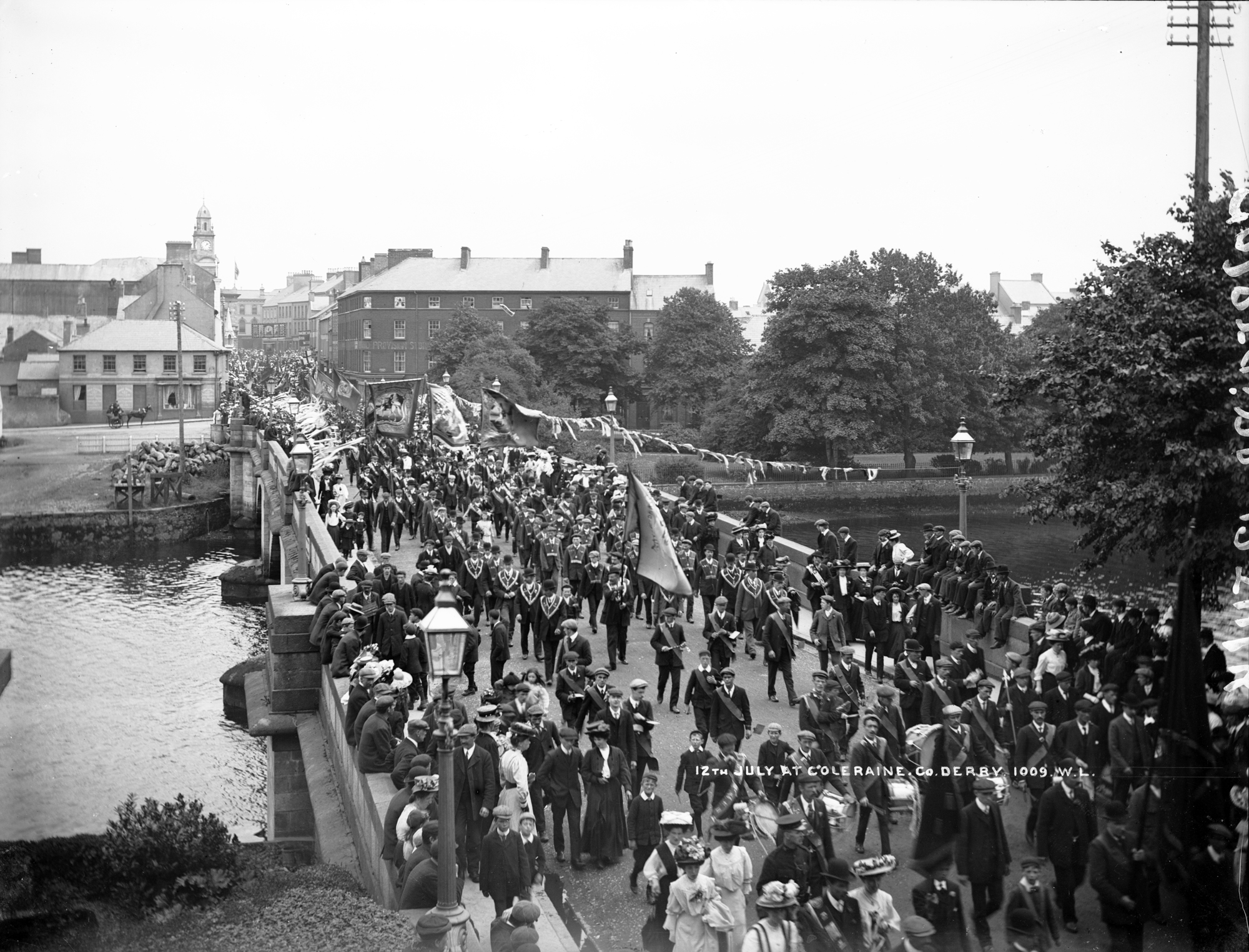
Twelfth parade in Coleraine, early 1900s.

Orangemen commemorated several events dating from the 17th century onwards, celebrating the rise of Protestantism in Ireland after the Irish Rebellion of 1641, and triumph in the Williamite War in Ireland, particularly the Battle of the Boyne. Early celebrations were on 23 October, the anniversary of the 1641 rebellion; and 4 November, the birthday of William of Orange, Protestant victor of the Williamite war in the 1690s. Both of these anniversaries faded in popularity by the end of the 18th century.

The Twelfth itself originated as a popular celebration of the Battle of Aughrim, which took place on 12 July 1691 in the 'Old Style' (O.S.) Julian calendar then in use. Aughrim was the decisive battle of the Williamite war, in which the predominantly Irish Catholic Jacobite army was destroyed and the remainder capitulated at Limerick, whereas the Battle of the Boyne was less decisive. The commemorations continued in the early 18th century, featuring bonfires and parades. The Battle of the Boyne (fought on 1 July 1690) was commemorated with smaller parades on 1 July. However, the two events were combined in the late 18th century. The first reason for this was the British switch to the Gregorian calendar in 1752, which repositioned the nominal date of the Battle of the Boyne to 11 July New Style (N.S.) (with the Battle of Aughrim nominally repositioned to 23 July N.S.). (Note: This repositioning was not typical, with most historic dates retained. For example, the Gunpowder Plot on 5 November 1605 continues to be commemorated on 5 November, not 16 November.) The second reason was the founding of the Orange Order in 1795. The Order preferred the Boyne, due to William of Orange's presence there. It has also been suggested that when Catholicism was having a resurgence in the 1790s, the Boyne became more appealing to the Order than Aughrim. The Jacobites were routed at the Boyne, whilst at Aughrim, they had fought hard, but suffered many casualties.

The Order's first marches took place on 12 July 1796 in Portadown, Lurgan, and Waringstown. The Twelfth parades of the early 19th century often led to public disorder, so much so that the Orange Order and the Twelfth were banned in the 1830s and '40s (see below).

== Events ==
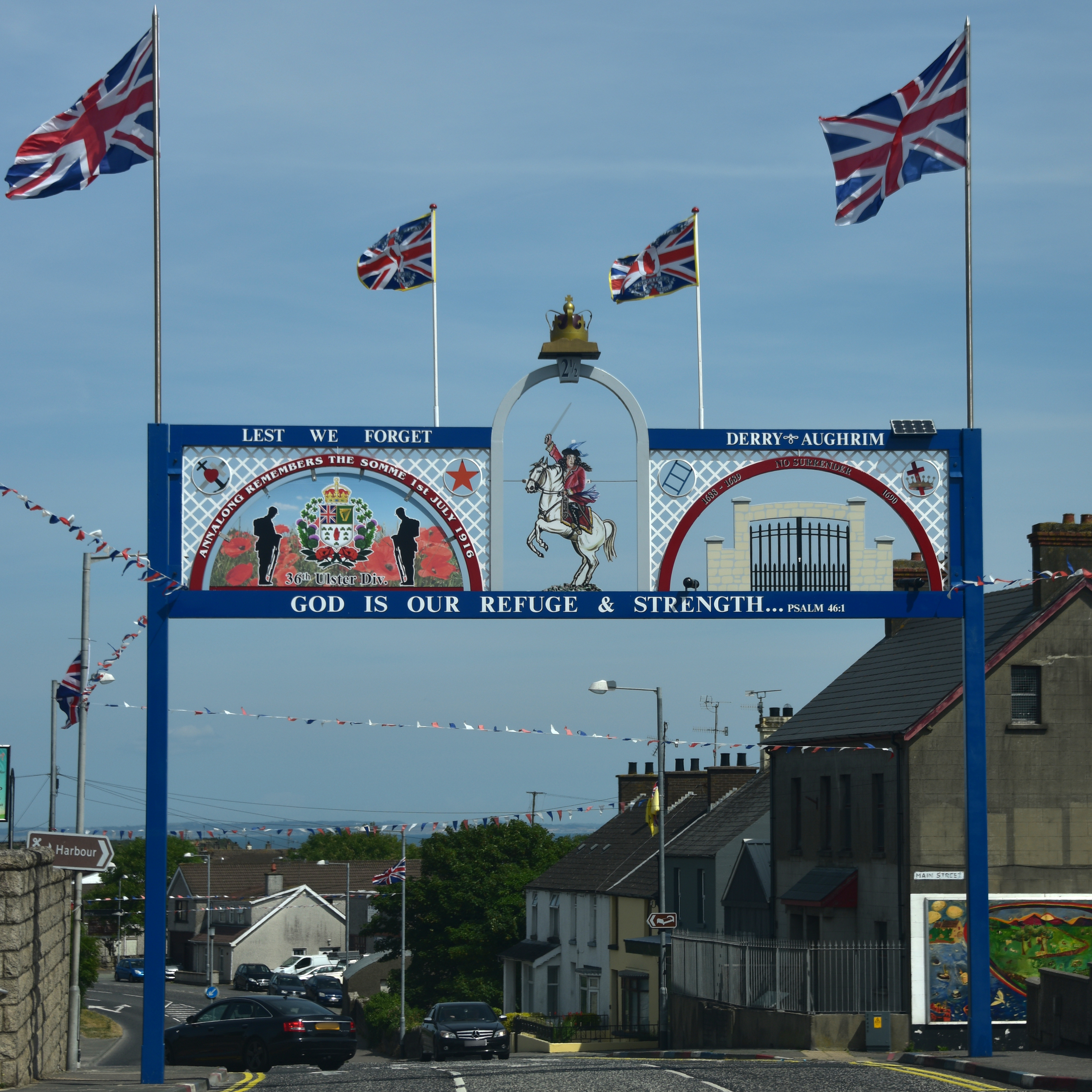
An "Orange Arch" and bunting in Annalong

=== Lead-up ===
In the weeks leading up to the Twelfth, Orange Order and other Ulster loyalist marching bands hold numerous parades in Northern Ireland. The most common of these are lodge parades, in which one Orange lodge marches with one band. Others, such as the "mini-Twelfth" at the start of July, involve several lodges.

From June to August, Protestant, unionist areas of Northern Ireland are bedecked with flags and bunting, which are usually flown from lampposts and houses. Most commonly the Union Jack and Ulster Banner. Kerbstones are sometimes painted red, white and blue; and murals made. Steel or wooden arches, covered with flags and Orange symbolism, are raised over certain streets. These 'Orange arches' are inspired by triumphal arches.

Additionally, the flags of loyalist paramilitary groups, such as the Ulster Volunteer Force (UVF) and Ulster Defence Association (UDA), are flown in some areas. The raising of these flags near Catholic/Irish nationalist neighbourhoods, or in "neutral" areas, sometimes leads to tension and violence. It is seen as deliberately provocative and intimidating.

Since 2007, the County Grand Orange Lodge of Belfast and the Belfast City Council organize Orangefest. Launched as a public relations and tourism initiative, Orangefest aims to reposition the traditional parade as a family-friendly, inclusive cultural festival. Orangefest features events centered around Belfast City Hall, including international food markets, street performances, and live music. It is held on the week leading up to the Twelfth. Orangefest is also regional, as in 2025, Dundonald Purple Vine held Orangefest in Moat Park, and had a range of events for each day. This included selling merchandise, continental food stalls, live music, an award's night and children's fun activities.

=== Eleventh Night ===
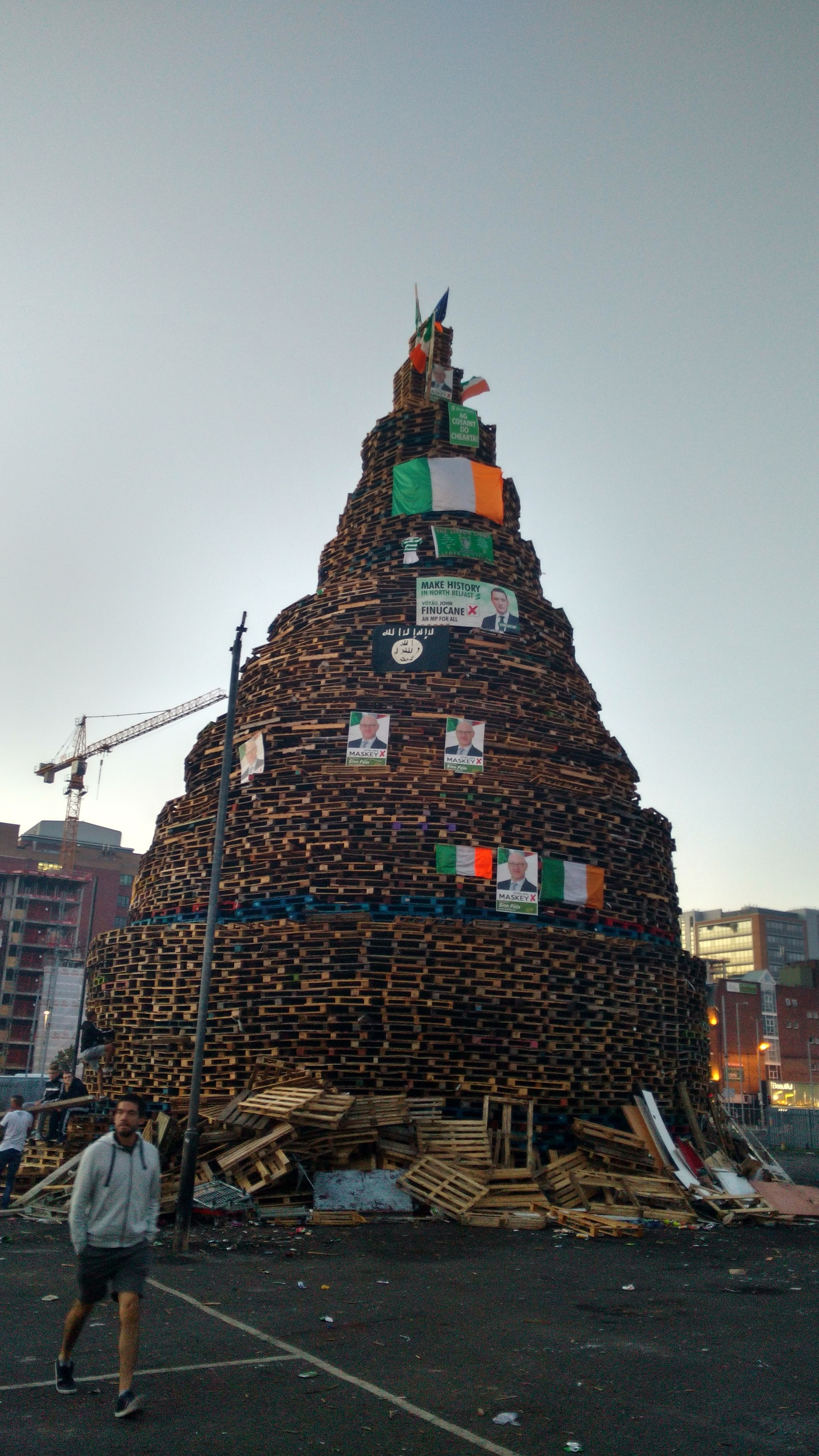
July 12th Bonfire on the evening of the 11th in 2017 in Belfast

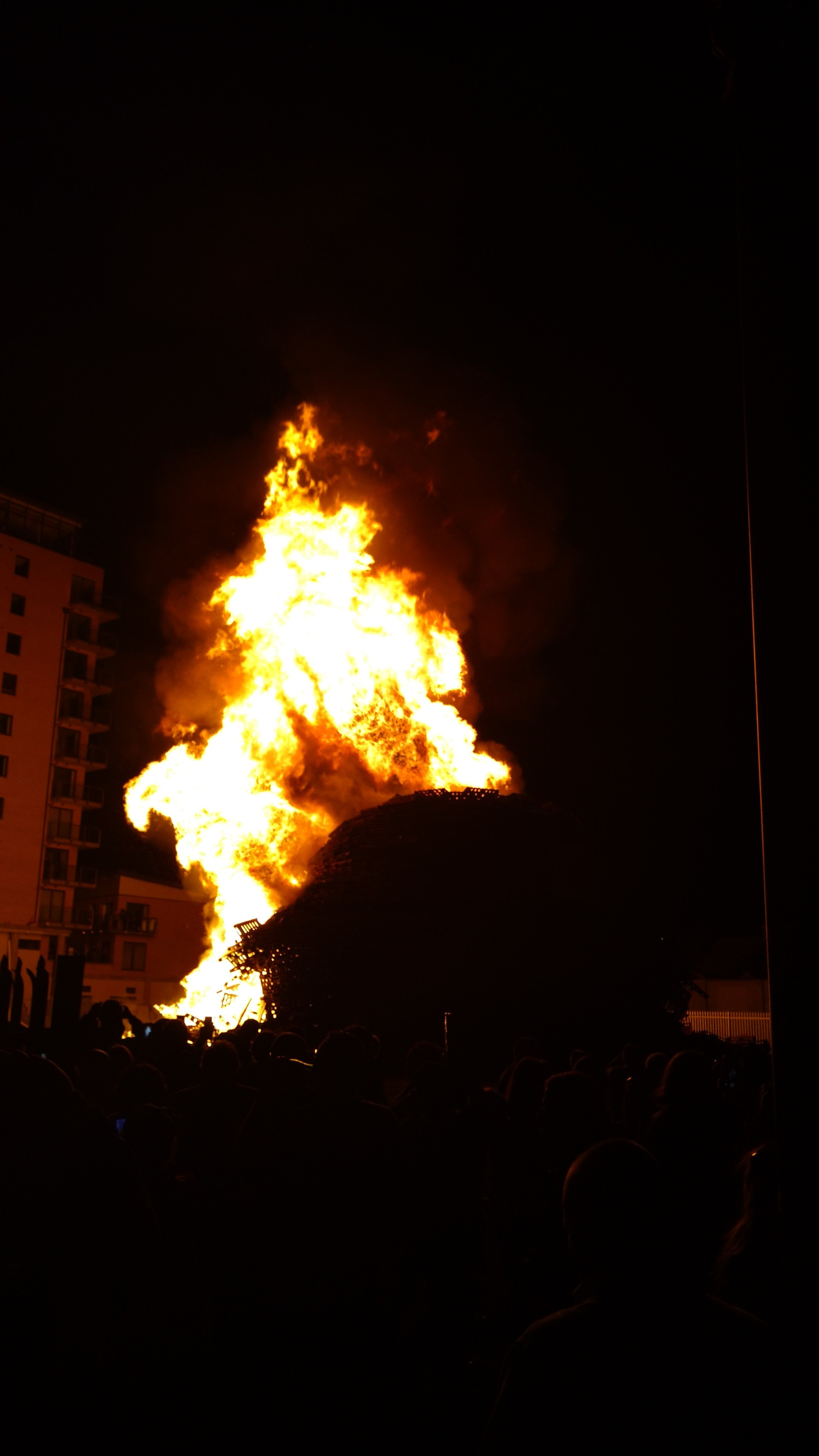
July 12th Bonfire after midnight in 2017 in Belfast

On the night before the Twelfth, called "Eleventh Night", bonfires are lit in many working-class Protestant neighbourhoods in Northern Ireland. They are built mostly of wooden pallets and lumber by local young men and boys in the weeks before the Twelfth. Their lighting is often accompanied by street parties and loyalist marching band. Eleventh Night events have been condemned for sectarianism, as well as the damage and pollution caused by the fires. Each year, Irish tricolours are burnt on many bonfires, and in some cases effigies, posters of Irish nationalist figures, and Catholic symbols are also burnt. During the Troubles, loyalist paramilitaries used bonfire events to hold "shows of strength", in which masked gunmen fired volleys into the air. Some are still controlled by paramilitary members, and authorities are sometimes wary of taking action against controversial bonfires. However, not all bonfires are controversial, and there have been attempts to de-politicize the events and make them more family- and environmentally-friendly. Some bonfires are also criticised as being unsafely constructed or environmentally hazardous due to the use of tyres in their construction.

=== Main events ===
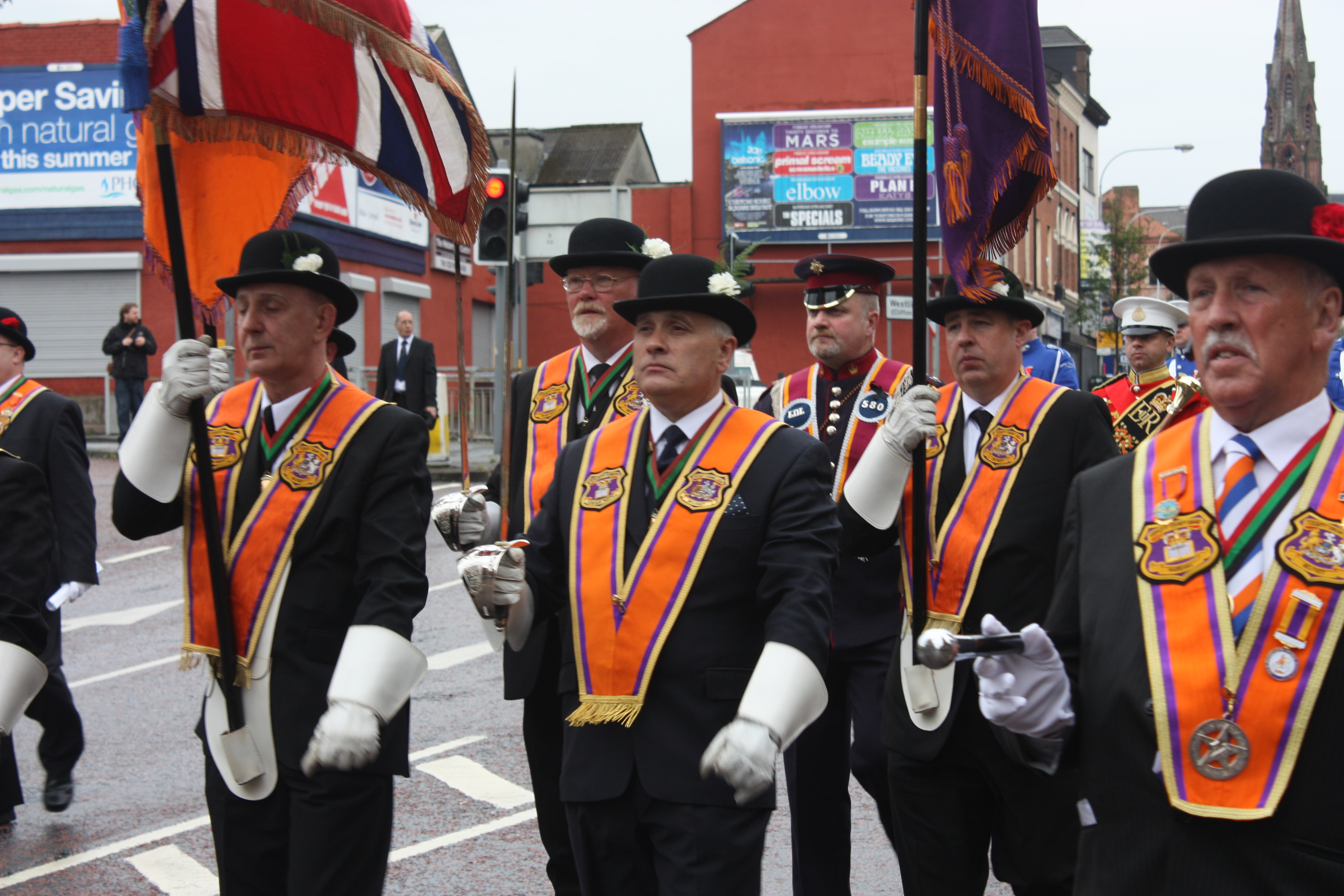
Orangemen in full regalia on 12 July 2011 in Belfast

The Twelfth is mainly celebrated with large parades involving Orangemen and supporting bands. Most of the parades are in Ulster, almost exclusively being held in Northern Ireland and County Donegal, although Orange lodges elsewhere often hold parades as well. The parade usually begins at an Orange Hall, proceeds through the town or city and out to a large park or field where the marchers, their friends and family, and the general public gather to eat, drink, and listen to speeches by clergymen, politicians, and senior members of the Order. A church service will also be held and sometimes band prizes will be awarded. In the past, the Twelfth has been a major venue for discussion of political issues. Within Northern Ireland, each District Lodge usually organises its own parade. In rural districts, the parade will rotate around various towns, sometimes favouring those in which there is less likely to be trouble, but in other years choosing those in which it is felt the 'right to march' needs to be defended.

There is a long tradition of Protestant and loyalist marching bands found in most towns in Northern Ireland, who are hired by the Orangemen to march in the parades. An instrument largely unique to these marches is the Lambeg drum. Popular songs include "The Sash" and "Derry's Walls". More controversial songs, such as "Billy Boys" are sometimes played as well.

The vast majority of marchers are men, but there are some all-women bands, and a few mixed bands. Some all-male bands have female flag or banner carriers. There are also some Women's Orange Lodges, which take part in the parades. Orangewomen have paraded on the Twelfth in some rural areas since at least the mid-20th century, but were banned from the Belfast parades until the 1990s.

Orangemen on parade typically wear a dark suit, an orange sash, white gloves and a bowler hat. Certain Orangemen carry a ceremonial sword. In hot weather, many lodges will parade in short-sleeved shirts. Orangewomen have not developed a standard dress code, but usually dress formally. The supporting bands each have their own uniforms and colours. Both the Orangemen and bands carry elaborate banners depicting Orange heroes, historic or Biblical scenes, and/or political symbols and slogans. The most popular image is that of King William of Orange crossing the River Boyne during the famous battle there. At the field, some lodges and bands don humorous outfits or accessories and make the return journey in them. The mood is typically relaxed and easygoing with the atmosphere on the return route becoming even more festive and animated.

The Northern Irish and County Donegal parades are given extensive local TV and press coverage, while the BBC Northern Ireland programme The Twelfth is the longest-running outside broadcast programme in Northern Ireland.

One of the largest Orange demonstrations held anywhere each year is the annual parade held at Rossnowlagh, a tiny village near Ballyshannon in the south of County Donegal in the west of Ulster. County Donegal being one of the Ulster counties in the Republic of Ireland, the Rossnowlagh demonstration is the only major Orange event in the Republic. A number of much smaller Orange events take place each year in East Donegal as well.

=== The Thirteenth and sham fight ===
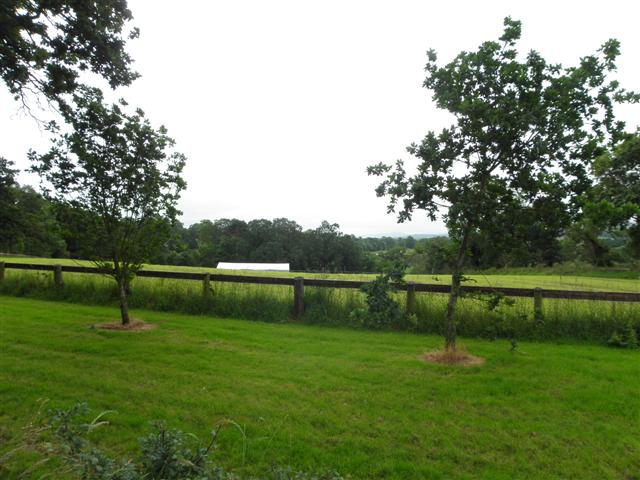
Site of the annual sham fight

Following the events leading up and Twelfth celebrations itself, the Royal Black Institution host the "Thirteenth" also known as the Royal Black Parades, that take place in Scarva and Bangor, as well as feeder parades in other towns like Portadown and Lurgan. The annual parade takes place the day after the Twelfth, on 13 July (or 14 July, if 12 July falls on a Sunday, pushing it the day after the Monday Twelfth).

The Scarva Black Parade consists of over 75 bands, consisting of silver, pipe, flute and accordion bands, and many Black Preceptories. After the large parade, a sham fight pageant takes place, actors portraying King William III and King James II, which inevitably concludes with King William as the victor. Around 100,000 spectators typically attend the Thirteenth of July event.

== Controversies ==
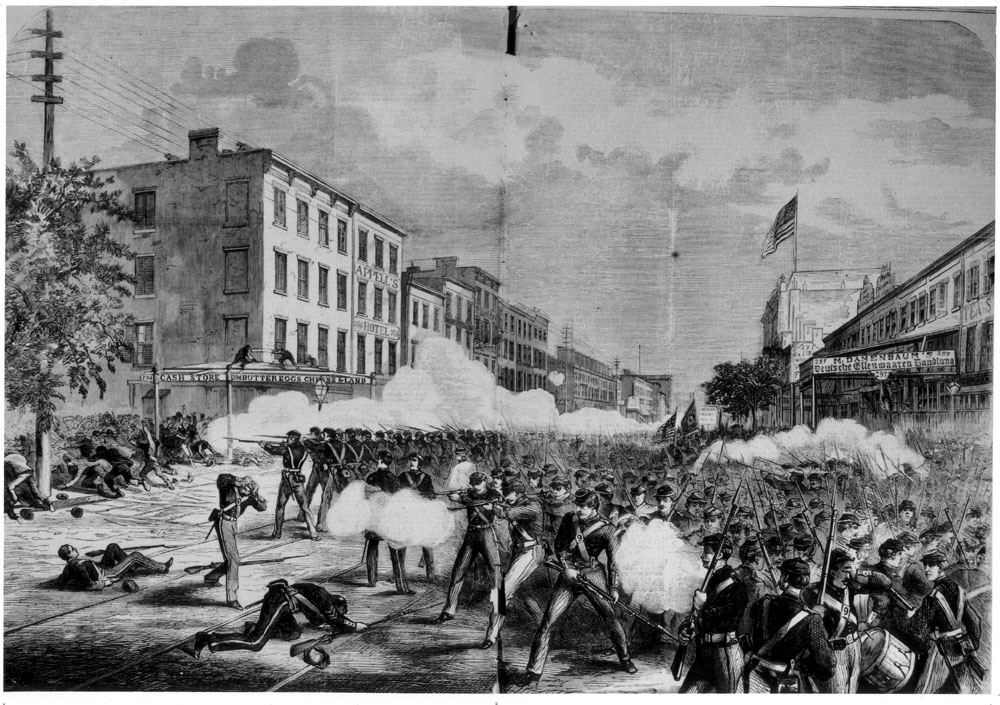
A depiction of 12 July 1871 riot in New York City, taking place at Lamartine Hall, the US Grand Orange Lodge headquarters on Eighth Avenue, Manhattan.

The Twelfth can be a tense time in Northern Ireland, where around half the population is from a Catholic background. Orange marches through Catholic and Irish nationalist neighbourhoods are usually met with opposition from residents, which sometimes leads to violence. Many people see these marches as sectarian, triumphalist, supremacist, and an assertion of British and Ulster Protestant dominance. The political aspects have caused further tension. Marchers insist that they have the right to celebrate their culture and walk on public streets, particularly along their 'traditional routes'.

In a 2011 survey of Orangemen throughout Northern Ireland, 58% said they should be allowed to march through Catholic or Irish nationalist areas with no restrictions, whilst 20% said they should negotiate with residents first. Some have argued that members of both communities once participated in the event; but this is disputed by others, who say it has always been a Protestant affair, with many Catholics opposing the marches.

A list of violent occurrences:

- On 12 July 1797, eight Catholic members of the County Kerry Militia died in a clash with Orangemen and local yeomanry in Stewartstown.
- Clashes broke out between Orange marchers and Irish nationalists in Belfast on 12 July 1813. Several Orangemen opened fire on a crowd in Hercules Street, killing two Protestants and wounding four other people.
- On 12 July 1829, eight people were killed during Orange marches in Enniskillen, seven were killed in Clones and one was killed in Stewartstown. In Maghera, several Catholic homes were burnt down, prompting the intervention of the military. There was also trouble at marches in Armagh, Portadown, Bellaghy, Comber, Greyabbey, Glenoe and Strabane.
- Five Catholics were reportedly shot dead in Rathfriland and three or four were drowned in the river near Katesbridge after Twelfth marches in 1831. The following August, all Twelfth marches were banned by the Party Processions Act 1832. This Act was to be enforced for five years, until August 1837.
- The military used six pieces of artillery to help quell trouble at a Twelfth gathering at Scarva in 1836.
- A gun battle broke out on the Twelfth in 1849, when Orangemen marched through the rural Catholic community of Dolly's Brae near Castlewellan. Orangemen clashed with Catholic Ribbonmen, leaving a number of Ribbonmen and other Catholics dead. This became known as the "Battle of Dolly's Brae". As a result of the clashes, the Party Processions Act was renewed the following year.
- The 1855 Toronto circus riot began after a brawl between American circus clowns and local firefighters at a brothel that took place on the Twelfth. By fighting with the firefighters on an important Orange Order holiday, the clowns had inadvertently angered the entire Orange Order in Toronto.
- Following the 1857 Twelfth marches in Belfast, sectarian rioting erupted in the city and lasted for ten days.
- The Portadown News reported that 16 Catholics were shot by Orangemen in Derrymacash on 12 July 1860. One died of his wounds. Stone-throwing had broken out when the Orangemen tried to march past the Catholic chapel. Outnumbered, some of the Orangemen opened fire on the Catholics and retreated. This led to the passing of the Party Emblems Act in August that year, which forbade the carrying of weapons and the wearing of party colours in procession.
- The Orange riots occurred two years in a row during Twelfth marches in Manhattan, New York City. In 1870, eight people died in the clashes. In 1871, over 60 civilians (mostly Irish Catholics) and three Guardsmen lost their lives and over 150 were wounded. The 1871 riot took place outside Lamartine Hall on Eighth Avenue, the Grand Orange Lodge of the United States headquarters.
- On 12 July 1884, a postal worker was shot and killed in a riot at Cleator Moor in West Cumbria.
- Throughout the summer of 1886, there were a string of riots in Belfast. Violence was particularly fierce during and after the Twelfth. By September, an estimated 31 people had been killed.
- On 12 July 1920, Ulster Unionist Party leader Edward Carson made a speech in which he said: "I am sick of words without actions" and he warned the British government that if it refused to adequately protect Unionists from the Irish Republican Army, they would take matters into their own hands. Violence soon followed. During the period of June 1920 to June 1922 more than 500 people were killed in Belfast alone, 23,000 people were made homeless in that city, while approximately 50,000 people fled the north of Ireland due to intimidation. See The Troubles in Northern Ireland (1920–1922).
- In 1935, the Twelfth led to the worst violence in Belfast since the foundation of Northern Ireland in 1922. The violence allegedly began when Orangemen tried to enter the Catholic enclave of Lancaster Street. Nine people were killed and 514 Catholic families, comprising 2,241 people, were forced to flee their homes.

=== The Troubles ===
The Twelfth was often accompanied by riots and paramilitary violence during the Troubles. On the Twelfth in 1972, five people were killed, three in Portadown and two in Belfast. Two were killed by Republican militant groups and three by Loyalist groups. During the Drumcree conflict in 1998, the Quinn brothers, aged 9, 10, and 11, were killed when loyalists firebombed their house in Ballymoney. The boys' mother was Catholic, but raising them as Protestants on a predominantly Protestant housing estate. The killings provoked widespread anger from both Catholics and Protestants.

Since the start of the Troubles, some bands performing at Twelfth marches have openly shown support for loyalist paramilitary groups, either by carrying paramilitary flags and banners or sporting paramilitary names and emblems. A number of prominent loyalist militants were Orangemen and took part in their marches. When Orangemen marched past the site of the Sean Graham bookmakers' shooting in 1992, some marchers held up five fingers to mock the five dead. Secretary of State, Patrick Mayhew, responded that they "would have disgraced a tribe of cannibals".

Between 1970 and 2005, British Army soldiers were deployed in Belfast on the Twelfth to help police the parades. Due to improved policing, dialogue between marchers and residents, and the Northern Ireland peace process, parades have been generally more peaceful since the 2000s. The Parades Commission was set up in 1998 to deal with contentious parades.

During the Troubles, some Irish Catholic and nationalist areas organised festivals to keep their children away from the parades, where they might come into conflict with Protestant children, and to make the Twelfth more enjoyable for their communities.

=== Incidents relating to ethnic minority communities, religious minority communities, immigrants, refugees and asylum seekers ===
In 2012, Poland flags were burned at several bonfires in Belfast.

In 2025, a bonfire at Moygashel featured a banner saying "stop the boats" and an effigy of a small boat with individuals on the boat wearing lifejackets.

In 2026, a bonfire at Moygashel featured an effigy of a mosque. In 2026, a bonfire in north Belfast featured a sign saying "PSNI Islam lovers".

== Outside Ulster ==
=== Britain ===
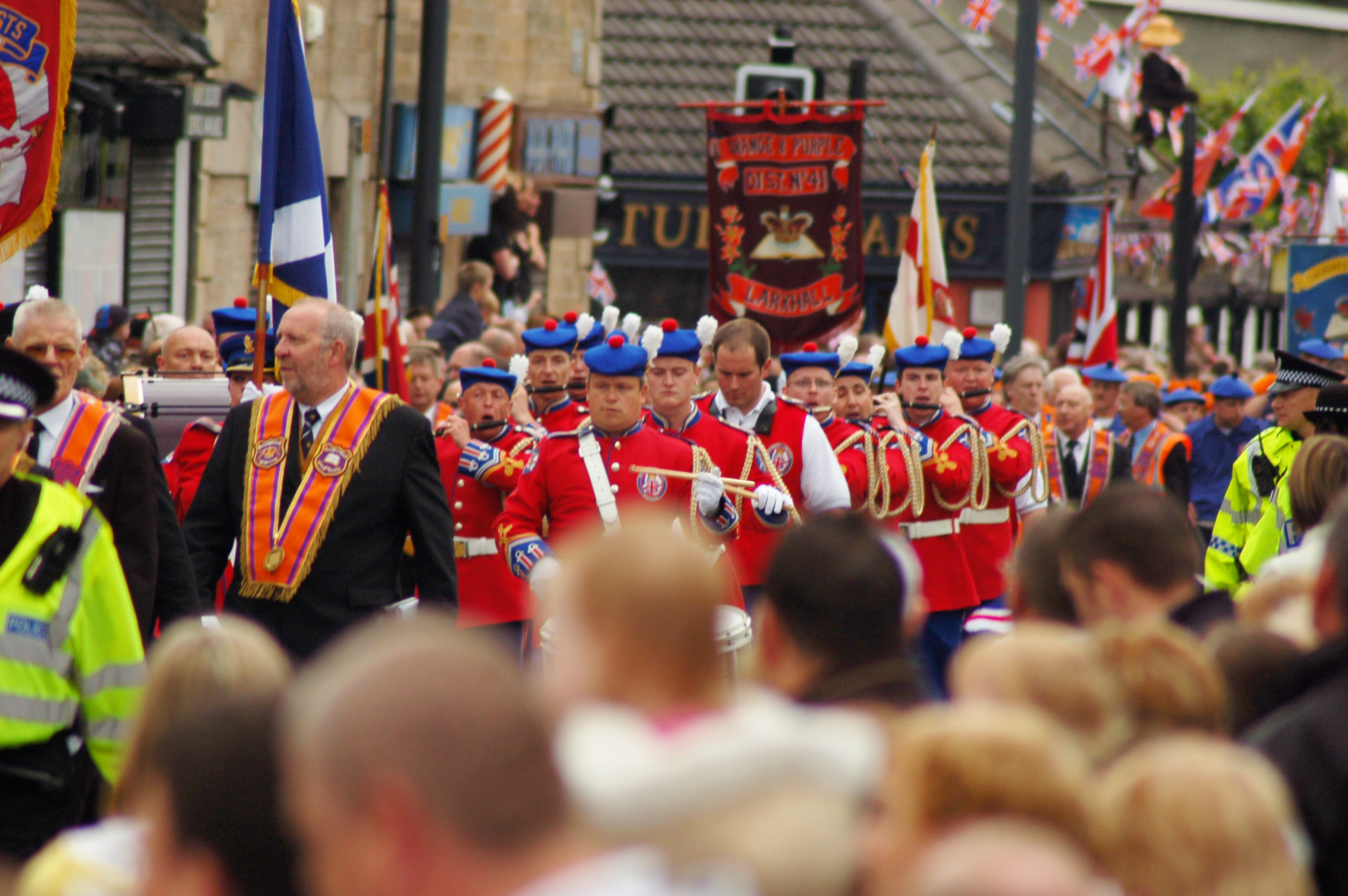
Orangemen parading in Larkhall, Scotland (July 2008)

Although mostly an Ulster event, the Twelfth is also celebrated in other countries with strong links to Ulster, or a history of settlement by Irish Protestants. There are commemorations of the Twelfth in Scotland – particularly in and around Glasgow, where a large amount of Irish Protestants settled, this parade is often referred to as the 'Big Walk', although this is typically held on the Saturday before July 12th. In 2025, more than 100 Orange Order marches were scheduled to celebrate the Battle of the Boyne in Scotland, with 50 of those in Glasgow, similar to 2024, with over 3500 lodge and band member taking part in Glasgow's celebrations. In England and Wales, Orange marches are not common and Orange Order membership is found primarily in the Merseyside region, although numbers are still small. Marches here tend to be held a week or so before the Twelfth, due to the number of bands and lodges who travel to Northern Ireland to march there. The Liverpool lodges parade both in the city and in the seaside resort of Southport on 12 July.

The Grand Lodges in the mainland are known as the Grand Orange Lodge of Scotland and the Grand Orange Lodge of England, the latter oversees the Orange Order in Wales.

=== Canada ===
The Twelfth March was first held in Canada in 1821, and is the longest consecutively held parade in North America, and the largest parade in Toronto, when thousands of Orangemen would march in front of tens of thousands of spectators, until the 1970s. At the time, the Orange Order held such sway that membership in the Order was an unspoken prerequisite for holding civic office. However, the march's popularity has drastically diminished in recent years, as only about 500 people participate in modern Orange parades. Orangemen's Day is still a provincial government paid holiday in the Canadian province of Newfoundland and Labrador, as of 2025. However, it is not a shops closing holiday.

=== Australia ===
An increase in Orange lodge membership in recent years has seen a revival of the Order in Australia, and an annual Twelfth of July parade is currently held in Adelaide. The first Twelfth procession in Australia took place in Melbourne in 1843, with the establishment of the Loyal Orange Institution of Victoria.

=== New Zealand ===
The first Twelfth of July procession in New Zealand took place in Auckland in 1877. In 2009, the Grand Orange Lodge of New Zealand travelled to County Donegal for the Twelfth of July procession and gave a speech.

=== Ireland ===
Until the Partition of Ireland in the early 1920s, the Twelfth was celebrated by Protestants in many parts of Ireland. However, the reduction of the Protestant population and relevance in the Republic of Ireland has resulted in the only remaining major annual parade now at Rossnowlagh, County Donegal. It was held on the Twelfth until the 1970s, when it was moved to the weekend before. There are no major Orange events in the rest of Ireland outside of the nine-county province of Ulster.

Former Tánaiste Michael McDowell said in 2010 that the Twelfth should be made a national holiday in the Republic of Ireland, as well as in Northern Ireland.

=== Spain ===
There is a big parade in Benidorm, Spain, first illegally held in 2005, but now a managed annual event, sanctioned by the town hall.

=== Turkey ===
An annual Twelfth parade is held in Marmaris, Turkey, organised by the Ibrox Bar Marmaris.

=== Africa ===
The Orange Order in Africa organize their own 12th of July parades. The West African lodges of the Grand Lodge of Ghana and the Grand Lodge of Togo. Local Orange lodges hold church services, parades, and thanksgiving events similar in form to those in Northern Ireland, often incorporating brass bands, religious hymns, and public processions through major towns such as Accra and Lomé.

Historically, Nigeria, South Africa and Sierra Leone have celebrated the 12th of July.

==== Togo ====
In Togo, the city of Lomé seen an inauguration of a dozen Orange Lodges. In 1986, the 12th of July Parade was conducted by RW Bro Dr Attoh-Mensah, the Grand Chaplain, assisted by RW Bro F K Fiase, the Deputy Grand Master. MW Bro Aboki Essien, the Grand Master of the Grand Orange Lodge of Togo, cited the Battle of the Boyne as a symbol of the confirmation of the Protestant faith.

==== Ghana ====
In Ghana, the Twelfth of July is marked annually by the Grand Orange Lodge of Ghana and its affiliated branches. Celebrations in Accra, Cape Coast, and other towns mark Orangemen's Day with celebrations of history and keeping the Protestant faith.

Ghanaian Orangemen march in formal attire, sashes, dark suits, and occasionally bowler hats.

=== United States ===
The first Orange parade in the United States took place in Boston, Massachusetts in 1824. The Grand Orange Lodge of the United States was formally recognised by the Grand Orange Lodge of Ireland in January 1870. The first Twelfth of July took place that year Manhattan, New York City. Due to the Orange riots, Police Commissioner James J. Kelso banned The Twelfth parade. However, Governor John T. Hoffman overturned this decision and ordered a much greater NYPD and militia presence.

== See also ==
- Culture of Northern Ireland
- Culture of Ireland
- Banners in Northern Ireland
- Ulster Scots dialect
- Ulster Scots people
- Orange walk
- Shutting of the Gates
- Orange Heritage Week
- List of Grand Orange Lodges
- Imperial Orange Council
- Royal Arch Purple
- Black Saturday demonstrations
- Guy Fawkes Night
