= Orange Walk =

Orange Walk may refer to:

- Orange Walk District, a district of Belize
- Orange Walk Town, a town in Belize
- Orange walk, a series of parades held annually by members of the Orange Order
