= Orange Order in Australia =

Protestant fraternal organization in Australia

Grand Orange Lodge of Australia
- Abbreviation: GOLA
- Formation: 1845
- Legal status: Religious brotherhood
- Headquarters: Wentworth Falls, New South Wales
- Region served: Australia
- Main organ: Trustees, Senior Officer Bearers
- Parent organization: Orange Institution

The Orange Order in Australia (officially the Loyal Orange Institution of Australia) is the Australian branch of the international Protestant fraternal organization known as the Orange Order founded in September 1795 in County Armagh, Ireland, following the Battle of the Diamond. Introduced to the Australian colonies in the early nineteenth century by Protestant immigrants from Ireland, Scotland, and England, the Order was established to promote Orange heritage, maintain loyalty to the British Crown, support the principles of the Reformed Christian faith, and engage in charitable works.

Orange lodges were established across all Australian colonies during the nineteenth century, particularly in New South Wales, Victoria, Queensland, South Australia, Tasmania and Western Australia. The Grand Orange Lodge of Australia was established in 1845. It is the governing body of the Australian Orange Order. The Order became one of Australia's largest Protestant fraternal organisations, providing mutual support for members while organising religious observances, charitable initiatives, educational activities, and public commemorations, including annual Twelfth of July celebrations, which commemorates Prince William of Orange and his victory against King James II. Australians travel to Ulster to participate and spectate the event. The Australian Grand Orange Lodge hosts its annual Twelfth in Adelaide, South Australia.

During the nineteenth and early twentieth centuries, the Orange Order played a significant role in the social and religious life of many Protestant communities and was particularly associated with Irish Protestant and Ulster Scots immigrants. The Orange Order during this time faced sectarian conflict with riots breaking out during Orange marches.

While membership has declined since the mid-twentieth century, the organisation continues to operate lodges in several Australian states and territories and remains affiliated with the wider international Orange Institution through the Imperial Orange Council.

There are also several Australian Orange Lodges under the Independent Loyal Orange Institution.

== History ==
=== Origins and early Colonial formations ===
The Loyal Orange Institution began in Australia in the early 1800s, with early military Orange lodges formed in New South Wales and Victoria following European settlement. The process was carried out when immigrants from the British Isles brought warrants with them to establish Orange Lodges. The earliest recorded activity includes a letter from Corporal Wm. McKee in 1823 to the Grand Lodge, noting that membership was increasing and advocating for the establishment of lodges for the colony's growing population of free settlers and discharged soldiers.

In 1830, the 17th (Leicestershire) Regiment of Foot arrived in New South Wales carrying Warrant No. 260, issued by the Grand Orange Lodge of England. The lodge's secretary, Brother Robert Fiddles, later wrote to the Grand Lodge stating that the lodge had 75 members and requested an additional warrant for a further 29 members serving with the 63rd Regiment in Hobart Town, Tasmania.

Although military commanders ordered the return of all military warrants in 1829, a number of Orangemen disobeyed the directive. They secretly retained their Irish and English warrants, using them to hold meetings that eventually spread inland to the goldfields towns. Under the terms of these military warrants, members were strictly prohibited from admitting non-military civilians. This restriction led to clandestine meetings.

In 1835, off the Lady Nugent ship, Private Andrew Alexander of the 50th (Queens Own) Regiment of Foot arrived in Sydney with Warrant No. 1780 sewn into his tunic by his wife. Alexander served as Worshipful Master for secret meetings held in a room above the Sydney printing office of two Derry Orangemen, Brothers Barr and Kitchen, located next to the Crown and Kettle Hotel. These secret gatherings defied the ban by admitting civilians and formed the first Australian civilian lodge, with the old military lodge ultimately transforming into "Sydney No. 1" in 1845.

In 1846, the city of Orange, in New South Wales was named in honour of Prince William of Orange by explorer Sir Thomas Mitchell. Mitchell was an associate of William during the Peninsular War.

=== Loyal Orange Institution of Victoria and early sectarian clashes ===
Flag of the Loyal Orange Institution of Victoria

In 1843, the Loyal Orange Institution of Victoria was established; it is one of the oldest Orange Institutions outside of Ireland. It was established in response to a sectarian protest in Elizabeth Street, Melbourne over the election of a Protestant candidate to the Legislative Council Lodge. The first Twelfth of July procession in Australia took place in the same year, held in Melbourne.

The Institution also developed permanent facilities including Orange halls and, later, an Orange Court at Box Hill, which provided accommodation for elderly members. In the 1890s, it was one of the largest Orange Institutions in Australia, overseeing 170 Orange lodges in the state. Women were admitted into the Victoria Orange Institution in 1903.

Sectarian violence in Victoria would regularly break out during Orange marches, particularly in 1845, 1846, 1896 and 1897.

The 1846 Twelfth of July in Melbourne broke into sectarian violence when Irish Catholic immigrants attacked the Pastoral Hotel, where Orangemen were celebrating. This caused the government to recreate the Party Processions Act, prohibiting flags and faction banners from being displayed in Melbourne's streets. In 1872, this act was repealed.

In August 1878, a representative from the Victorian Orange Institution presented seaman Thomas Richard Pearce with a Holy Bible at the Protestant Hall, Melbourne. This was in recognition of his "invaluable service rendered in saving life" after rescuing the shipwreck survivor Eva Carmichael. It has since been preserved and is held on loan by the Flagstaff Hill Maritime Museum and Village.

=== Expansion across the Colonies (1850s–1870s) ===
The coastal town of Kiama became known as the "Loyal Valley" due to having 9 Orange Lodges and a strong concentration of Ulster Protestants in the small town.

In 1854, the first Orange Lodge in South Australia met in Port Adelaide. In 1860, the Grand Orange Lodge of South Australia was established. In 1874, the Loyal Orange Institution of South Australia was established, 14 years after its Grand Lodge was constituted. The first Grand Master was John Stokes Bagshaw. Lyrics to The Sash "Derry, Aughrim, Enniskillen and the Boyne" are engraved on his resting place plaque. In 1880, the first women's lodge was established in Adelaide. The state would grow to 3,100 members within the South Australian Grand Orange Lodge by 1894.

By 1868, Orange membership continued to grow with the colony. Twelfth of July processions would be annually held in major cities including Sydney and Melbourne. The majority of towns had an Orange Hall.

In 1865, the Loyal Orange Institution of Queensland Grand Orange Lodge was established. The institution was initially called the "Loyal Protestant Association of Queensland" changing its name on January 30, 1873.

The Loyal Orange Grand Council of Australasia was founded in 1883 to act as a network and as the supreme coordinating body between the Orange Order in Australia and New Zealand. Meetings of District Masters and Orangemen representatives from both nations were held on a routinely basis, the location would change on rotation.

=== Duke of Edinburgh assassination attempt ===
The Loyal Orange Institution of Australia experienced its historical zenith, marked by an unprecedented surge in public profile, political influence, and membership following the attempted assassination of Prince Alfred, Duke of Edinburgh, in Sydney in 1868.

On March 12, 1868, Prince Alfred (the second son of Queen Victoria) was attending a charity picnic at the beachfront suburb of Clontarf on Sydney's Middle Harbour during the first-ever British royal tour of Australia. Henry James O'Farrell, an Irish immigrant and vocal supporter of Irish republicanism, approached the Prince and shot him in the back at close range with a revolver. While the Prince survived the attack and made a full recovery, the incident sent an outcry through the Australian colonies, igniting a severe wave of anti-Catholic sentiment and a widespread "Fenian panic" over suspected hidden Irish nationalist conspiracies. It was the first political assassination attempt in Australia.

Prominent colonial politicians, most notably the Colonial Secretary Sir Henry Parkes, aggressively capitalized on the public outrage. Parkes utilized the sectarian discord to push repressive emergency legislation through Parliament and stoke fears of treasonous organisations.

The Orange Order directly benefited from this socio-political climate. Presenting itself as the premier fraternal shield against Catholic subversion and the primary defender of the British Crown in the Southern Hemisphere, the Order saw its ranks swell with thousands of new enlistees. By 1876, active membership in New South Wales alone peaked at over 19,000 Orangemen distributed across more than 120 regional and state lodges. During this late-19th-century zenith, the Order transformed from an immigrant-centric fraternal society into a highly coordinated political machine capable of swinging colonial elections and deeply embedding itself within public institutions like the colonial civil service and municipal governments.

=== Parliamentary influence ===
Orangeman Edmund Webb served on the first Bathurst Borough Council and was elected Mayor of Bathurst multiple times (1866, 1868, and 1875–1877). He represented the seats of West Macquarie (1869–1874) and East Macquarie (1878–1881) in the NSW Legislative Assembly. He was later appointed to the NSW Legislative Council up until his death in 1899. He was described in the Freeman's Journal in 1873 as a "rabid Orangeman".

In 1869, Joseph Wearne, an English-born Australian politician who served for West Sydney in the New South Wales Legislative Assembly, joined the Australian Loyal Orange Institution.

==== Key political figures ====
In 1870, Australian politician John Wheeler became a member of the New South Wales Orange Institution. Wheeler was appointed Grand Master of the New South Wales Grand Lodge for multiple extensive terms, serving in 1886, from 1894 to 1909, and again in 1912. He also served as President of the Loyal Orange Council of Australasia.

Upon his return to Sydney in 1874, Orangeman and politician Ninian Melville focused his politics on working-class Protestant circles. He represented Northumberland in the New South Wales Legislative Assembly from 1880 to 1894.

James Russell was a Scottish-born merchant, gold miner, and politician. Emigrating to Australia in 1853 during the gold rush, he eventually established himself as a successful produce and grocery merchant in Ballarat East, where he served as a long-time town councillor and twice as mayor. He represented Ballarat East in the Victorian Legislative Assembly from 1883 to 1889.

Oswald Snowball joined the Victorian Orange Institution 1878, and went on to become Grand Master of the Australian Orange Order. He took part in Loyal Orange Grand Council of Australasia meetings.

Orangeman and politician John Hurley was a founder and director of Protestant Hall in Sydney, a key gathering spot for the city's fraternal orders including the Orange Institution. In November 1879 when he attempted to pass a highly controversial parliamentary bill demanding the forced state inspection of all Catholic convents, nunneries, and monasteries.

Politician William Schey joined the New South Wales Orange Institution in 1877. He was an active member until his death in 1913.

James Munro went on to become the 15th Premier of Victoria.

From 1887 to 1904, Simon Fraser served as Grand Master of the Victorian Orange Institution. In parliament, he fought for the cause of the Orange Order.

In the 1880s, politician Bill Wilks joined the Orange Institution of New South Wales. He used his strong ties to the Orange Institution to mobilize Protestant working-class voters in Sydney. It proved highly valuable to Prime Minister George Reid during early Australian federal political clashes with Catholic leaders, most notably Cardinal Patrick Moran.

Albert Palmer was a prominent member of the Orange Institution and Protestant Federation, who served as a member of the Australian House of Representatives from 1906 until his death. He represented the federal electorate of Echuca for the Anti-Socialist, Commonwealth Liberal, and Nationalist parties.

To support this expanding political network, specialized media outlets were established. The Sentinel operated as a Sydney-based newspaper from 1845 to 1848 to champion Protestantism and Orangeism. It was later succeeded by The Sentinel and Orange and Protestant Advocate, established in 1877 to distribute institutional news and political commentary across the colonies.

=== Late 19th century frontier violence ===
In the late 19th century, the Loyal Orange Institution of Western Australia Grand Orange Lodge was established.

In 1892, The Loyal Orange Institution of Tasmania Grand Orange Lodge was established.

As the Orange Order expanded into rapidly developing goldfields and industrial areas, traditional Old World rivalries frequently sparked civil unrest.

In 1896, the Twelfth of July processions in Brunswick led to sectarian violence during the march. The march resulted in a man being shot dead in the Protestant Hall. Prior to the march, Father Luby, parish priest of St. Ambrose's Roman Catholic Church sought to get the march banned. The police had been ordered to attend the scene as they learned of Irish Catholics gathering at the Sarah Sands Hotel, the location of the start of the Orange procession. Multiple arrests were made by the Melbourne police.

The following year, violence erupted on the Western Australian goldfields in 1897, the Twelfth of July in Coolgardie, Western Australia, planned by the Western Orange Institution broke out in violence. They planned to march to Wesleyan Church for an afternoon service. However, a "hurling contest" was already scheduled by Irish Catholic groups at the assembly point. Tensions grew when they met, and the confrontation turned violent, resulting in "an unusual display of ferocity and lawlessness", as stones and other weapons were used in the goldfields town.

=== 20th century ===
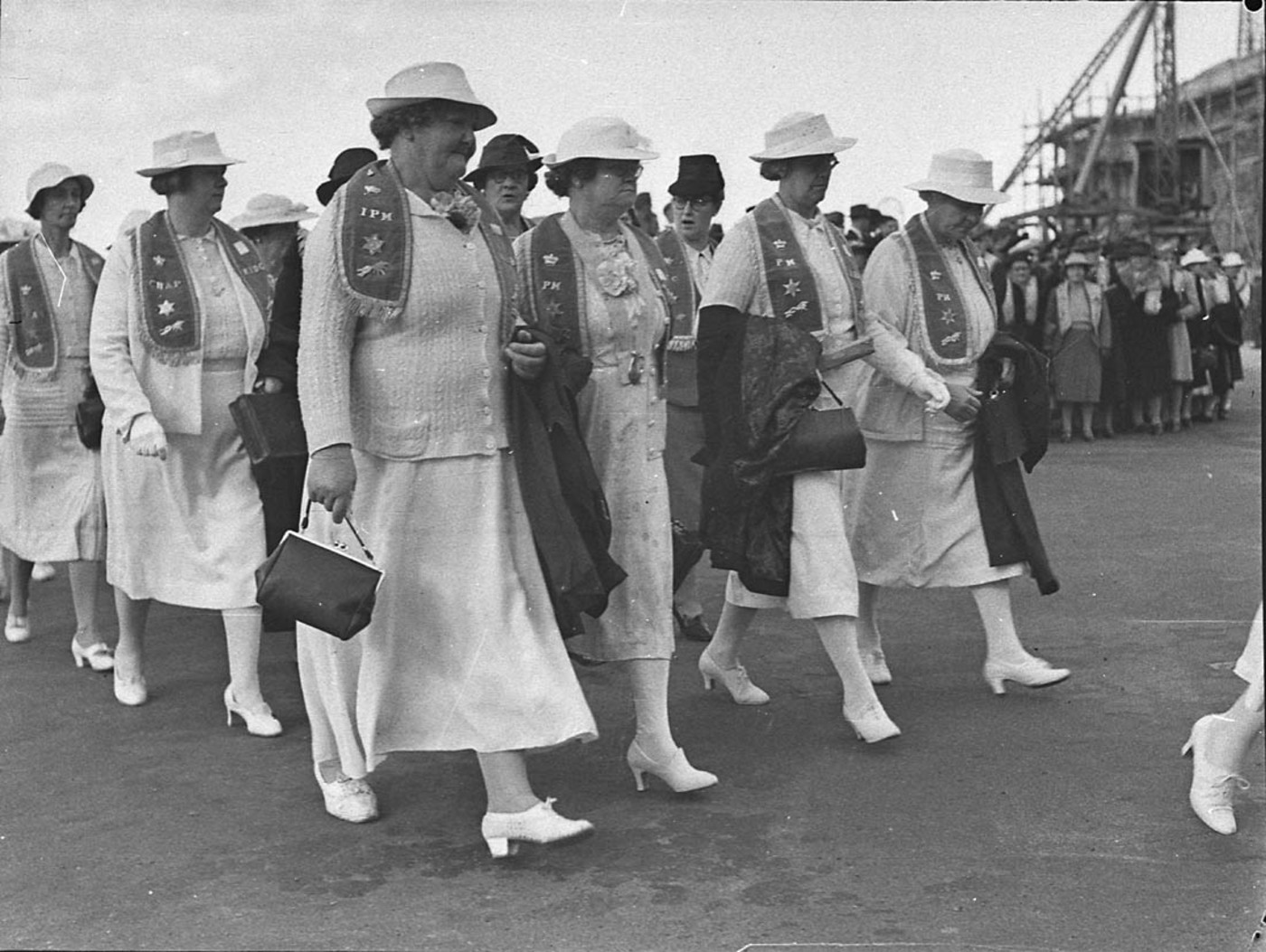
Women's Orange Lodge parading on the Twelfth of July 1940, New South Wales

The turn of the century brought significant structural changes, notably the formal institutional enfranchisement of women. The Grand Orange Lodge of New South Wales formally established its first dedicated women's lodges in 1898, followed by the Loyal Orange Institution of Victoria in 1903. In 1904, a women's lodge was granted to open by the Loyal Orange Institution of Tasmania in Scottsdale. It was to facilitate an increase in membership, having 132 female members in three lodges. Four of the eleven lodges in Tasmania were female.

Sectarian frictions persisted into the early federation era; during the Twelfth of July processions in 1901 in Boulder, Western Australia, the celebrations were attacked by Catholic counter-protesters.

Orangeman Reverend Dr. William Marcus Dill Macky was an Irish-born Presbyterian minister who joined the Apprentice Boys of Derry as a youth. After emigrating to Australia, he joined the Loyal Orange Institution of New South Wales in 1887 and became chaplain. Dill Macky founded and served as the first president of the Australian Protestant Defence Association in 1901, a highly influential political body that grew to 22,000 members.

In 1902–1903, Dill Macky publicly criticized Prime Minister Sir Edmund Barton following Barton's official visit to the Pope, subsequently organizing a petition to the Federal Parliament that garnered over 30,000 signatures. While touring regional areas to mobilize support that same year, his appearances provoked severe unrest and he was targeted by gunfire and stoning in Wyalong and Temora, New South Wales, where local authorities were forced to read the Riot Act to disperse the crowds. This period of heightened sectarian animosity culminated in the 1904 New South Wales state election, which was narrowly won by Sir Joseph Hector Carruthers with the crucial backing of the organized Protestant vote. Following the election, the intense political friction began to subside, despite the opposition of Dill Macky and other militant factions on both sides of the debate.

Macky maintained strongly conservative and evangelical views, including a fervent belief in the imminence of the millennium. His steadfast rejection of historical-critical methods of biblical analysis led to institutional friction in 1907, when students at St. Andrew's College declined to attend his lectures, arguing that his curriculum failed to address contemporary biblical scholarship. Dill Macky resigned from his teaching position in response, publicly asserting that a "flood of rationalism" was encroaching upon the Presbyterian Church. He was buried at Rookwood cemetery with Orange rites.

Orangeman of the New South Wales Orange Institution and politician John Farleigh was the founding president of the Liberal and Progressive League, and a member of the New South Wales Legislative Council from 1908 to 1934.

In the early 1900s, politician Charles William Oakes joined the New South Wales Orange Institution. Oakes was originally associated with the Labour Party, but following a dispute, he left and aligned himself with the Liberal party and the Orange Order.

In the 1920s, the political arm of the movement found a potent rally point in the controversial "Sister Liguori" case involving an escaped nun. Walter Peden Joyce Skelton, who joined the New South Wales Orange Institution during his early career as a railway stationmaster, partnered with the NSW Protestant Federation to leverage the case, using public anxiety over Catholic papal decrees regarding mixed marriages to build political momentum. Skelton's prominent standing within the fraternity culminated in his election as Grand Master of the Orange Institution of New South Wales from 1930 to 1931.

==== The World Wars ====
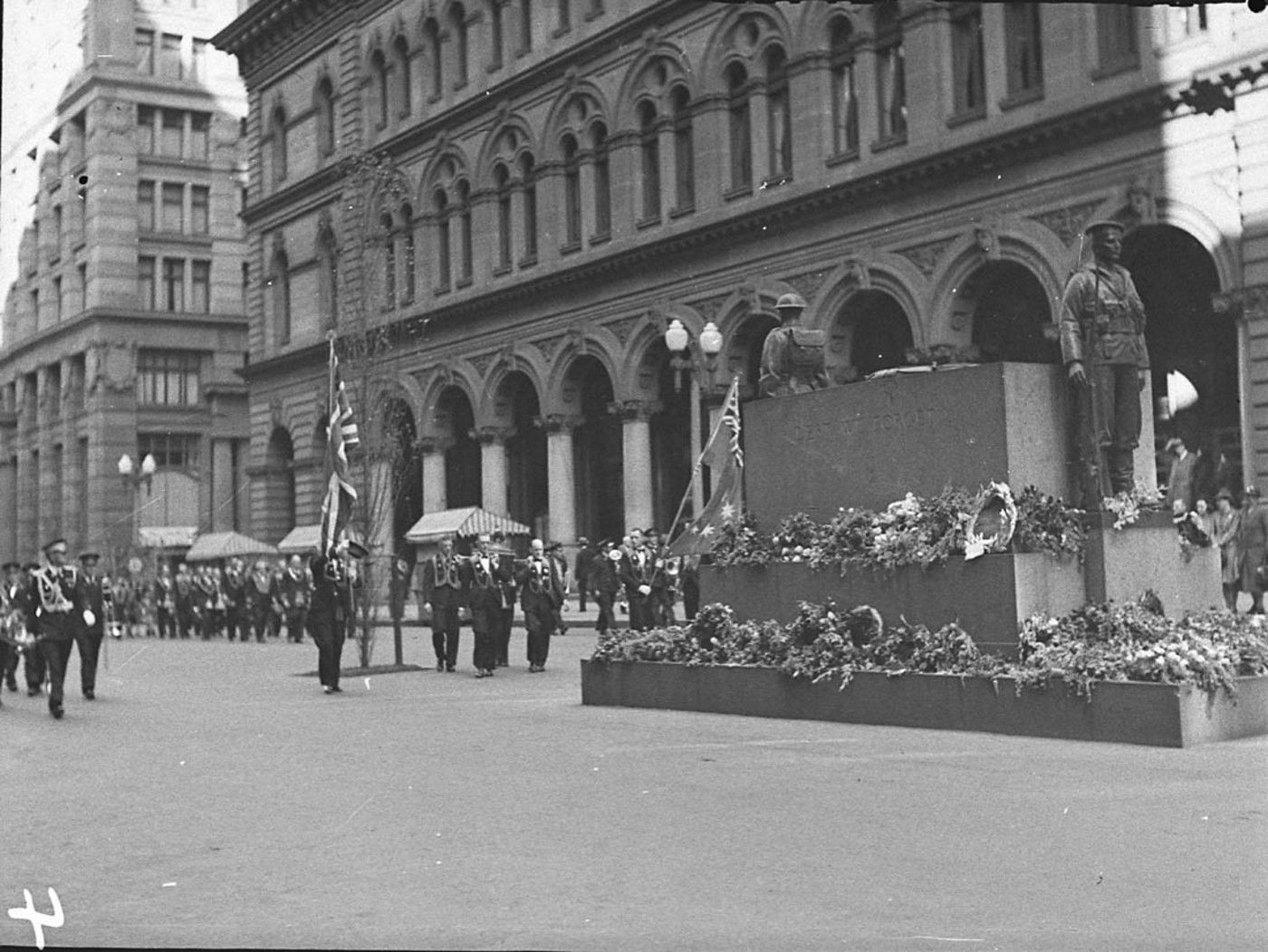
Loyal Orange Institution of New South Wales, Twelfth of July procession 1940

In World War I, many Australian Orangemen joined under the 36th Ulster Division. Due to a large loss of life from the first day of the Battle of the Somme, the British Army recruited from outside of Ulster. The Australian Orange Order encouraged enlistment and gave heavy support to the British Army.

Able Seaman Bro William George Vincent Williams of L.O.L. 92 Melbourne, was the first Australian to be killed in World War I.

Lieutenant James Anderson Kerr Johnston from the Loyal Orange Lodge No. 92 served in World War I as an officer in the 7th Battalion. He was initiated into the Victorian Naval and Military Lodge No. 49 in July 1910. Lieutenant Johnston was sent to Egypt for training before taking part in the Mediterranean Expeditionary Force's operations and volunteered for the First Australian Imperial Force. His unit was heavily engaged in the landing and subsequent brutal trench warfare at Gallipoli against the Ottoman army. He was evacuated to Egypt for medical treatment but died of his wounds on May 19, 1915.

The Orangemen are commemorated at the Army Museum of Western Australia. Installed is a carved jarrah wood and hand-painted honour board commemorating members of Western Australian Orange Lodges who enlisted in the Australian Imperial Force.

=== 21st century ===
Loyal Orange Institution of Victoria operates dedicated social housing and aged-living retirement complexes. They also fund youth scholarships and provide church ministry aid.

The Loyal Orange Institution of South Australia is a registered charity based in Hackham.

In 2009, the Grand Orange Lodge of Australia and the Grand Orange Lodge of Victoria travelled to the Republic of Ireland to take part in the Rossnowlagh Twelfth processions. The Grand Master gave a speech at the end of the parade.

In July 2018, Australian Grand Master John Morrow was selected as Grand Master at the triennial meeting of the Imperial Orange Council. Ten Australian Orangemen accompanied him to the arrangement in Edinburgh.

The current Grand Secretary of the Grand Orange Lodge of Australia is Ian Kells. He emigrated from Enniskillen and previously served as Grand Secretary of the Loyal Orange Institution of New South Wales.

== Orange Lodges ==
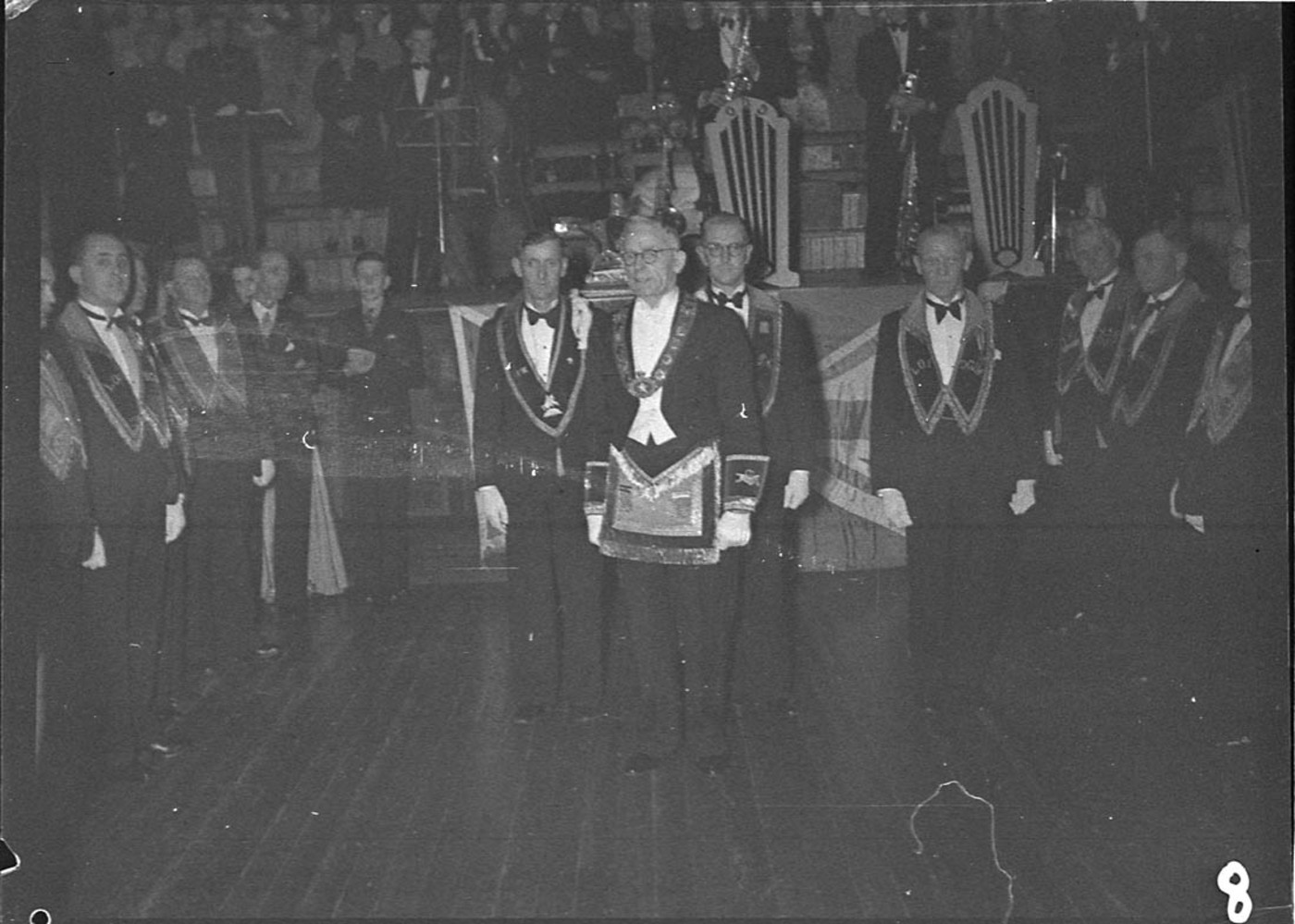
Australian Orange Lodge, New South Wales

=== New South Wales ===
- Grand Orange Lodge of Australia (Grand Lodge)
- Loyal Orange Lodge No. 1 (Sydney)
- Loyal Orange Lodge No. 2 (New South Wales)
- Loyal Orange Lodge No. 3 (New South Wales)
- Loyal Orange Lodge No. 4 (New South Wales)
- Loyal Orange Lodge No. 5 (Kiama / South Coast)
- Loyal Orange Lodge No. 6 (New South Wales)
- Loyal Orange Lodge No. 7 (New South Wales)
- Loyal Orange Lodge No. 8 (New South Wales)
- Loyal Orange Lodge No. 11 (Penrith)
- Loyal Orange Lodge No. 27 (Sydney)
- Loyal Orange Lodge No. 36 (Bathurst)
- Loyal Orange Lodge No. 96 (Taree)
- Loyal Orange Lodge No. 99 (Lismore)

=== Queensland ===
- Duke of Manchester Loyal Orange Lodge
- Queen of the Downs Loyal Orange Lodge
- Dowey's Purple Star Loyal Orange Lodge
- Purple Star Loyal Orange Lodge
- Hearts of Oak Loyal Orange Lodge
- Lodge Furness Loyal Orange Lodge
- Wynnum Loyal Orange Lodge
- Southern Cross Loyal Orange Lodge
- Toowoomba United Loyal Orange Lodge No. 120
- Star of Balmoral Loyal Orange Lodge
- Lurgan Lily Juniors Loyal Orange Lodge
- Hope of South Brisbane Loyal Orange Lodge
- Pioneer Loyal Orange Lodge
- England's Glory Loyal Orange Lodge
- Temperance Loyal Orange Lodge
- Pride of Cairns Loyal Orange Lodge
- Friendship Loyal Orange Lodge No. 26
- Loyal Protestant Lodge of Brisbane
- Hope of Yandina Loyal Orange Lodge
- Warwick Primrose Loyal Orange Lodge
- Purple Border Loyal Orange Lodge (Kingaroy)
- Townsville Loyal Orange Lodge
- Mackay Loyal Orange Lodge No. 27
- Diamond True Blue Loyal Orange Lodge

=== South Australia ===
- Derby Loyal Orange Lodge No. 1 (Adelaide)
- Vernu Loyal Orange Lodge No. 2 (Adelaide)
- Drumcalpin Loyal Orange Lodge No. 3 (Rice's Creek / Auburn)
- Diamond Lake Loyal Orange Lodge No. 4 (Honiton District)
- Enniskillen Loyal Orange Lodge No. 5 (Norwood)
- Royal Bismarck Loyal Orange Lodge No. 6 (Mount Gambier)
- Duke of York Loyal Orange Lodge No. 7 (Alberton)

=== Western Australia ===
- No Surrender Loyal Orange Lodge No. 37 (Fremantle)

== Royal Black Association of Australia ==
The Royal Black Association of Australia, also known as the Grand Black Chapter of Australia, serves as the governing body for the Royal Black Institution across the country. Membership is restricted exclusively to members of the Orange Order who have previously attained the Royal Arch Purple degree.

Introduced to Australia in the late 19th century following the expansion of Orangeism, Preceptories were established across several states, including New South Wales, Queensland, and Victoria.

The Provincial Grand Black Chapter of New South Wales oversees, 4 Royal Black Preceptories, while the Provincial Grand Black Chapter of Victoria oversees 3 Royal Black Preceptories.

== Apprentice Boys of Derry ==
The Apprentice Boys of Derry is closely tied with the Orange Institution, with members in Australia. Formally established under a charter from the Murray Club (one of the eight parent clubs based at the Memorial Hall in Derry), the first official Australian branch club held its inaugural meeting in Burwood, Sydney, in June 2019. The Australian Murray club members used Zoom to hold meetings due to the COVID-19 pandemic. Members have to be initiated in the Walls of Derry, Australian members have travelled to be initiated, such as in 2024.

== See also ==
- List of Grand Orange Lodges
- Orange Order in New Zealand
- Grand Orange Lodge of Ireland
- Grand Orange Lodge of Scotland
- Grand Orange Lodge of England
- Orange Order in the Republic of Ireland
- Orange Order in Canada
- Orange Order in the United States
- Orange Order in Africa
- Orange Heritage Week
