= Orange walk =

Series of parades held by the Orange Order

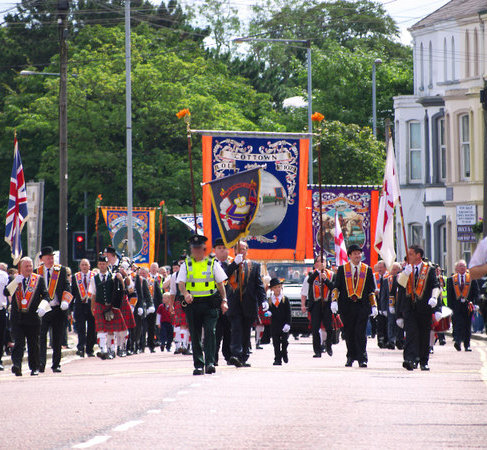
Orangemen marching in Bangor, County Down, Northern Ireland, on 12 July 2010.

Orange walks, or Orange marches, are a series of parades by members of the Orange Order and other Protestant fraternal societies, held during the summer months in various Commonwealth nations, and most notably across Northern Ireland and Scotland. The parades typically build up to 12 July celebrations marking Prince William of Orange's victory over King James II and VII at the Battle of the Boyne in 1690.

Orange walks are considered controversial and face opposition from Catholics, Irish nationalists, and Scottish nationalists who see the parades as sectarian and triumphalist. They have also drawn criticism in recent years from other religious communities, left-wing groups, and trade unions.

== The "marching season" ==
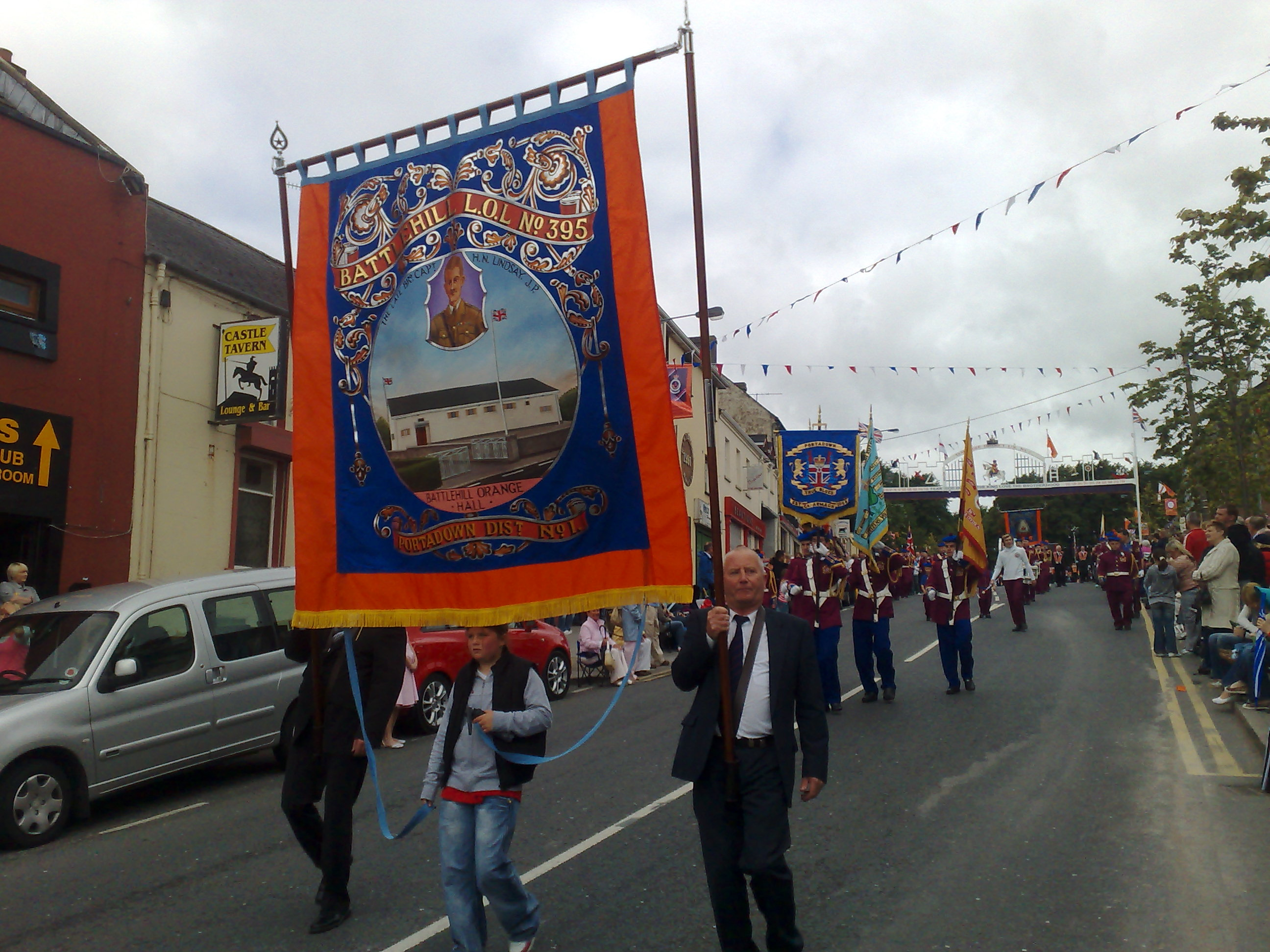
Battlehill LOL 395 marching in Tandragee on 12 July 2008

The "marching season" generally refers to the months April to August in Northern Ireland and includes marches by groups such as the Apprentice Boys of Derry, and the Royal Black Institution as well as the Orange Order. The Orange Order is arguably the most active marching group. The Orange Standard newspaper is used as a source for people to find out about marches on different dates and locations for the various districts for the Twelfth of July. This includes world-wide coverage of events. Typically, each Orange Lodge holds its own march at some time before 12 July, accompanied by at least one marching band. On 12 July each district holds a larger parade consisting of all the lodges in that district, and sometimes including lodges from outside Northern Ireland. This is particularly the case with the Belfast district, whose parade commonly features several Scottish lodges and often some from other countries. In most districts, the parade's location varies from year to year, rotating through suitable towns. Belfast is an exception; it has kept more or less the same route for many decades.

Orangefest is a cultural event that takes place the week before the 12th of July Parade. Different host towns hold their own version of Orangefest locally. The week-long event started in 2007. The Belfast Orangefest is organized between the County Grand Orange Lodge of Belfast and Belfast City Council. Events include many family-friendly activities, including street performances, singing, heritage tours, international food markets and reflection of remembrance.

The Royal Black Institution holds the Royal Thirteenth the day after 12 July in Scarva and Bangor.

At the end of April, Belfast Orange Lodges attend a charity service at Ulster Hall in support of the Belfast Orange Lodges Widows Fund. A parade also takes place.

Some walks commemorate historical events. Most notably, 12 July marches observe the Battle of the Boyne. Marches in Northern Ireland on and around 1 July commemorate the participation of the 36th (Ulster) Division in the Battle of the Somme. Locations include east Belfast, Down and Armagh.

The "Mini Twelfth" is held in multiple locations in Northern Ireland. The Ballynafeigh District hold theirs on the first Wednesday in July after the Somme parades, fourth weekend in June sees South Antrim and West Belfast Mini Twelfth, Portadown hold theirs on the second Saturday in June, and in North Belfast, there are two, one on first Friday in June and the other the third weekend in June.

The end of May marks the annual Junior Orange parade for junior lodges from Armagh, South Tyrone and Fermanagh.

The Easter Tuesday parade is held by Belfast and South Antrim junior lodges.

"Carrick Day", also known as the "Royal Landing", is an annual pageant and multi band parade held in Carrickfergus. It commemorates the landing of King William and includes a re-enactment.

Black Saturday demonstrations take place in August, most notable the last Saturday of August, with England, Scotland and Fermanagh holding their Black Saturday on the first Saturday in August. This formally marks the end of the marching season.

The Orange Order designated 1 September as Orange Victims Day an annual day of remembrance by holding a service and parade for the members of the Loyal Orders killed during the Troubles. They chose this date to mark the anniversary of the Tullyvallen massacre.

On 11 November, a number of Orange Lodges hold short parades to mark Armistice Day.

Reformation Day parades honour Martin Luther, who nailed his 95 theses to the church door in Wittenberg, starting the Reformation that brought about the Protestant churches. The parade routes destination is a church for church service.

Ulster Day is commemorated on 28 September at the end of Orange Heritage Week to mark the 1912 signing of Ulster's Solemn League and Covenant with a parade in Belfast and other locations in Northern Ireland. Nearly half a million people signed the pledge to oppose the Third Home Rule Bill and keep Northern Ireland tied to the United Kingdom. In 2025, a re-enactment of the signing of the Ulster Covenant was held in Tandragee and Carrickfergus.

A lodge parade is usually a small walk held in the local Orange Lodges town or village accompanied by a marching band. These smaller parades are commonly held to mark the anniversary of the lodge or to commemorate the annual election of local lodge officers, including the Worshipful Master, Secretary, and committee members.

The Shutting of the Gates is the last major parade of the Loyal Orders, taking place on the first Saturday in December.

On 27 September 2026, after a ban of almost 30 years, the group were given approval to march in Portadown. However, hundreds of protestors blocked the road and the police service gave instructions not to march. The stand-off lasted until midnight with Orangemen remaining in the church at the start of the route. A group attempted the march again at 04:00 AM the following morning but were blocked by police vehicles. The standoff continued for several weeks; the Northern Ireland secretary ultimately intervened and banned the march on 11 October in the interest of avoiding violence and disorder.

== Form of parades ==
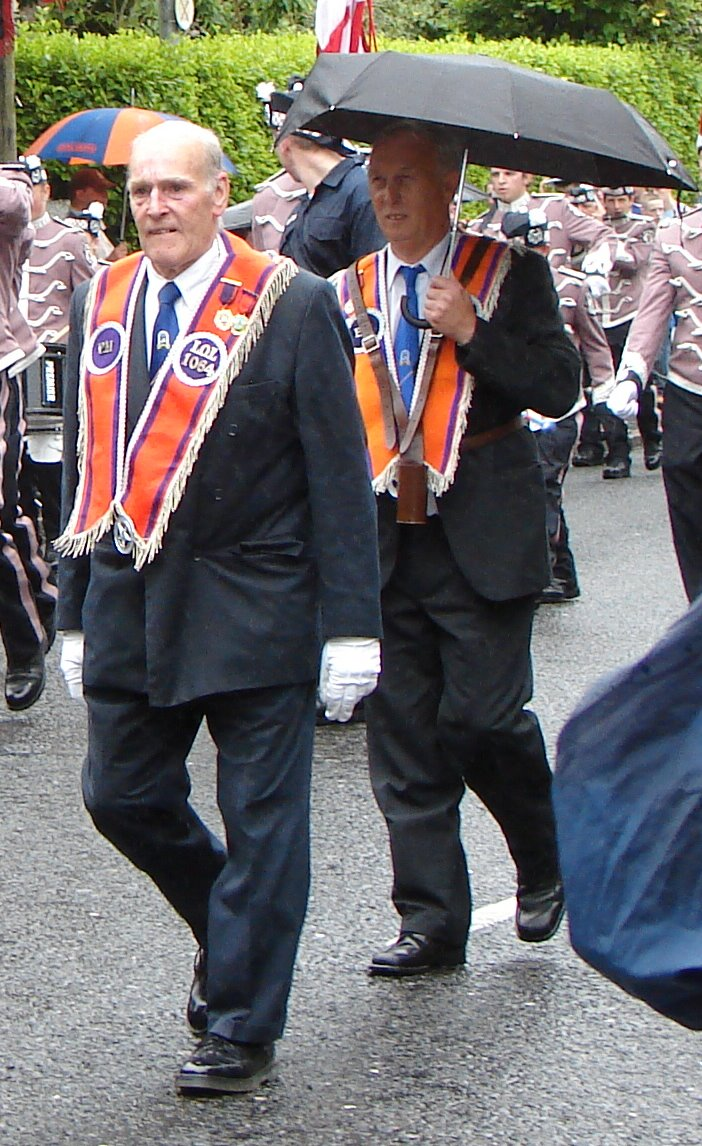
Orangemen in typical marching wear.

All Orange walks include at least one lodge, with officers. The lodge is almost always accompanied by a marching band, often a flute band, but also fife and drum, silver, brass and accordion bands. Participants range from as few as one lodge, up to dozens of lodges for major events such as the Twelfth. Elderly or infirm lodge members often travel the parade route in vehicles such as black taxis.

In recent decades, it has become much more common for members of ladies' lodges to walk, although men still greatly outnumber them in most parades. Larger walks, especially on the Twelfth, may be headed by a figure on a white horse dressed as William of Orange. A few parades include others in historical fancy dress; or, more rarely, a float, such as that constructed for the 1990 Twelfth celebrations to represent the Mountjoy, the ship which lifted the Siege of Derry.

=== Regalia and accessories ===
Parading Orangemen usually wear dark suits. Some Orangemen wear bowler hats and walk with umbrellas, although it is not mandatory. Walkers wear V-shaped orange collarettes (often inaccurately referred to as sashes) bearing the number of their lodge, and often badges showing degrees awarded within the institution, and positions held in the lodge. Some lodge officers also wear elaborate cuffs, and many walkers wear white gloves, although has become less common. Most lodges carry at least one flag, most commonly the Union Flag. Other common flags include the Ulster Banner, the Flag of Scotland and the Orange Order flag. Lodges also usually carry a banner with the lodge's name and number, and usually depicting William of Orange on at least one side. Other popular banner subjects include deceased lodge members, local landmarks, and the Bible with a Crown.

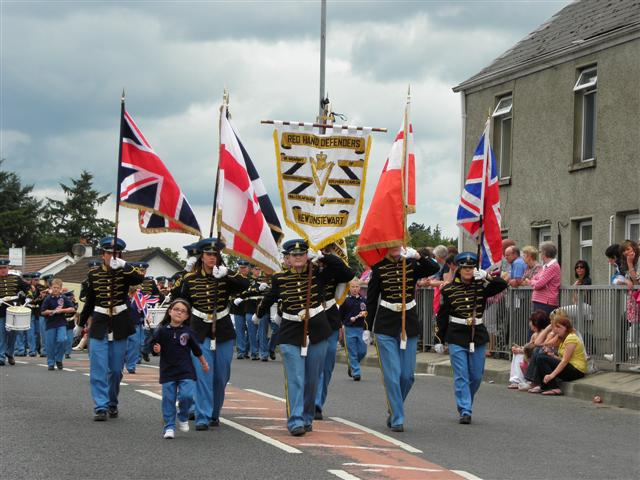
The "Red Hand Defenders" flute band marching with the Orange Order in Newtownstewart on 12 July 2010. The flags being carried are the Union Flag, Ulster Banner and Boyne Standard.

=== Bands ===
Typically, there is one band per lodge. Some bands have formal connections with the lodge, but in most cases it is simply hired for the day. Bands and lodges pair up by word of mouth, through the band or lodge advertising in Protestant publications such as the Orange Standard, or as a result of a lodge member hearing the recordings many bands produce. Most bands have a strongly Protestant ethos and display bannerettes and flags associated with loyalism, and in some cases, paramilitary groups. Many are associated with or named after Protestant areas such as the Shankill Road in Belfast, although the number of "Shankill Road" bands suggest that many of their members must also be from elsewhere. In 1985, concerned that some bands' behaviour was bringing the Order into disrepute, the Grand Orange Lodge instituted a system of contracts requiring bands to behave appropriately. According to writer and former Orangeman Brian Kennaway, the contracts have been largely ineffective, mostly because of the Order's reluctance to enforce them.

== Controversy ==
Throughout the history of the Orange Order, Orange walks have faced opposition, both from Catholics and nationalists, who have seen them as sectarian and triumphalist; and from the general public, due to inconvenience and controversies associated with them. Although many nationalists find the parades offensive, conflict usually arises only when a walk passes through or near a Catholic-dominated area. During The Troubles, many marchers were verbally abused, had objects thrown at them, and were involved in abusing onlookers, something walkers following the march still do today. The marching season requires a significant police presence to avert violence. In the early 1970s, parading was banned on several occasions, although never on 12 July.

Currently, of the more than 2,000 annual parades in Northern Ireland, only a handful are considered majorly contentious. The best known is the Drumcree conflict. The Drumcree area, near Portadown has a history of parading disputes going back to the 19th century. The current dispute centres on the refusal of the Parades Commission to allow the Portadown lodge through the Catholic Garvaghy Road during their annual celebrations in early July. The conflict led to severe rioting in the late 1990s, but the area has been relatively calm in recent years.

Parade opponents in Drumcree and elsewhere have put forward several arguments against the parades:

- That they are sectarian regardless of their route
- That they celebrate the defeat of Irish Catholicism
- That when they go through majority- or traditionally-Catholic areas, they are particularly insulting and triumphalist
- That they cause serious inconvenience to residents, as roads must be closed and, in particularly contentious areas, access to the roads denied

One observer has argued that the Orange Institution and its demonstrations deny Nationalists and Catholics their human rights.

The Orange Order and its supporters have countered that:

- The parades are not sectarian, and that any sectarian activity or violence is perpetuated by outsiders and "hangers-on" over whom the Order has no control
- That inconvenience is caused mostly by the need for police to protect marchers from the violence of their opponents
- That the disputes are not actually about parading, but are a way for republicans to attack Protestantism.

They have also argued that they have a fundamental "right to march"—that any group should be able to walk down "the Queen's highway" without interference. In practice, however, the Order has tended to oppose marches by republicans and other "disloyal" groups on the grounds that there is no right to parade sedition.

The Order has a policy of non-negotiation with residents' groups, as it believes they are dominated by Sinn Féin and do not represent residents' actual opinions.

In a 2011 survey of Orangemen throughout Northern Ireland, 58% said they should be allowed to march through nationalist areas with no restrictions, and 20% said they should negotiate with residents first.

== Walks outside Northern Ireland ==
=== Republic of Ireland ===
Orange walks were once common throughout Ireland, especially on 12 July. Since partition, the Orange Order in the Republic of Ireland have dwindled in numbers, due to the decline of the Protestant population of the Republic. The last walk in Dublin was in 1937.

The only remaining walks in the Republic take place in County Donegal and County Monaghan, Ulster counties which border Northern Ireland. In County Donegal, several small Orange walks take place each year in East Donegal, while the main walk in the county takes place each year at Rossnowlagh in South Donegal. A major Apprentice Boys 'demonstration' takes place each August in Raphoe, also in East Donegal. The annual picnic in Drum, County Monaghan features a small-scale peaceful march. Another small-scale march occurs annually at Killeevan. A march organised by Love Ulster, a unionist group inspired by the Orange Order, was scheduled to be held in Dublin in 2006; however, the march was cancelled when rioting broke out before it began.

Although local Royal Black Preceptories had paraded in County Donegal for decades, Raphoe hosted the Royal Black institution's first major Irish demonstration, Black Saturday on 27 August 2005. Raphoe, under the County Londonderry demonstration, hosted the parade again in 2016.

Since 2009, an Orange walk takes place in Oldbridge, County Meath, at the site of where the Battle of the Boyne took place, alongside its respective visitor centre. In 2026, an Orangeman praised the welcome from the locals.

=== Scotland ===
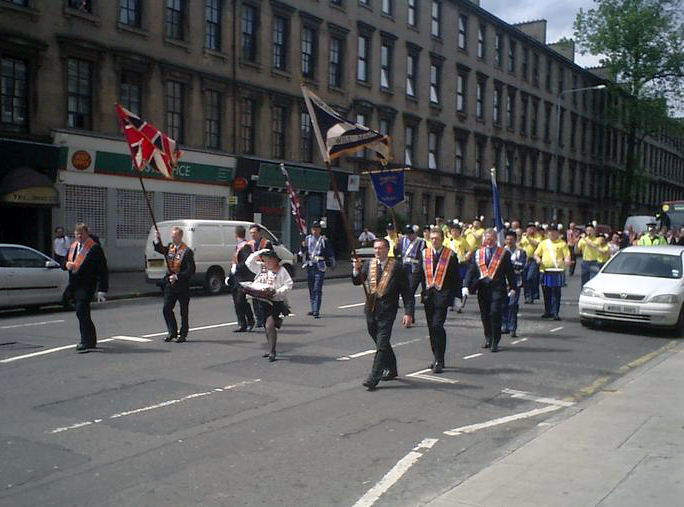
Orange parade in Glasgow (1 June 2003).

Orange walks continue across Scotland, but they are concentrated in Glasgow, Lanarkshire, Ayrshire, Renfrewshire, West Lothian and East Lothian. In 2009, it was reported that Glasgow held more Orange Walks than both Belfast and Derry combined, with Glasgow hosting 247 to Belfast and Derry's joint 217, with a senior council source saying “We now have a situation where we have more parades in Glasgow than in the two largest cities in Northern Ireland put together."

In 2003, a survey of 1,029 Scottish people revealed that 53% were either in favour or strongly in favour of banning Orange Walks, and 24% opposed banning them. Of these respondents, Catholics were more likely than Protestants to say that Orange Walks should be banned (66% and 39%, respectively).

It is accepted that events such as national days are marked by parades by other organisations, religious and otherwise, such as the Scouts and the Boys' Brigade - but apart from one-off anniversaries such as centenaries, that tends to be the limit of such activity. This is in stark contrast to Orange Walks which - in some areas of Glasgow - can be seen and heard almost every day during parts of the summer months. Consequently, and also due to disproportionate costs, initiatives have been introduced to the Glasgow City Council to restrict the number of marches.

This disconnect between the frequency of Orange walks and wider societal norms has caused the walks to be more broadly criticised as incitements to hatred and violence. The Grand Orange Lodge of Scotland has supported police moves to fine spectators for sectarian activity. Grand Master Ian Wilson has said: "All the effort that has gone into defending our interests can be destroyed by the stupidity of the few".

=== England and Wales ===
The Grand Orange Lodge of England oversees parades across England and Wales. The Twelfth is held annually in Southport and Liverpool. All of these Orange Lodges from all districts come to take part in the parades.

Each Provincial District holds an annual district parade in their city, this includes Liverpool, Manchester, Newcastle and London.

The Grand Orange Lodge of England holds an annual Remembrance Service during Remembrance Weekend at The Cenotraph in Whitehall, Westminster. Orangemen are led by flute and pipe bands.

In September, the annual Lord Carson Somme Memorial Parade takes place in central London.

=== Oceania ===
==== Australia ====
Marches were common in Australia at the turn of the 20th century. The Kalgoorlie and Boulder marches in the 1890s and 1900s attracted conflict between Catholics and Protestant marchers. An increase in membership in recent years has seen a revival of the Orange Order in Australia, and an annual Twelfth of July parade is currently held in Adelaide. In New Zealand, walks continued until at least the 1920s, but no longer take place.

==== New Zealand ====
The Grand Orange Lodge of New Zealand still exists, they oversee a number of active Orange Lodges. They travel to Donegal to participate in the Rossnowlagh Twelfth.

=== North America ===
==== Canada ====
In Canada, Orange Walks on 12 July were once large public occasions, particularly in the provinces of Ontario and Newfoundland that have a strong Loyalist heritage dating from the time of the American Revolution. Toronto's Orange Parade has been held annually since 1821, but its turnout has dwindled in recent decades. Some parades continue to be held in other parts of Canada. Orange walks have occurred in Liverpool. 1 July marks the annual Bobcaygeon Canada Day parade in which the Canadian Orange Order take part in.

==== United States ====
In the United States, there are no longer Orange parades, but is noted for the heavily publicized Orange riots that took place in 1870 and 1871. Leading up to the 1870 Twelfth of July in Manhattan, New York City, the Supreme Grand Orange Lodge of the United States was chartered by the Grand Orange Lodge of Ireland that January. Riots broke out when counter protesters, who were Irish Catholics, became hostile and fights broke out. In 1871, the majority of the conflict took place on Eight Avenue, outside the American Grand Lodge headquarters, known as Lamartine Hall. This results in the deaths of 60 civilians and over 150 injured, included NYPD officers and militia.

=== Africa ===
The Orange Order in Africa's two biggest Orange Lodges are Grand Orange Lodge of Togo and the Grand Orange Lodge of Ghana. The host locations for the Twelfth of July parade in Togo is normally Lomé and Atakpamé. In Ghana, lodges gather in the capital city, Accra.

=== Mainland Europe ===
==== France ====
Remembrance parades take place at the Somme battlefields in northern France, at Thiepval, close to the Ulster Tower. The march is dedicated to the Orangemen and Ulster Volunteer Force soldiers in the 36th Ulster Division during WWI.

==== Spain ====
The Twelfth takes place annually in Benidorm, Spain. Known as the "Orange Fiesta", it first held illegally in 2005, it is now a managed event, over the years, as attendance grew with thousands of participants and spectators traveling to the coastal resort town.

=== Middle East ===
An annual Twelfth procession is held in Marmaris, Turkey. It is organised by British immigrants and owners of the Ibrox Bar Marmaris.
