= Orange Riots =

Riots that took place in New York City

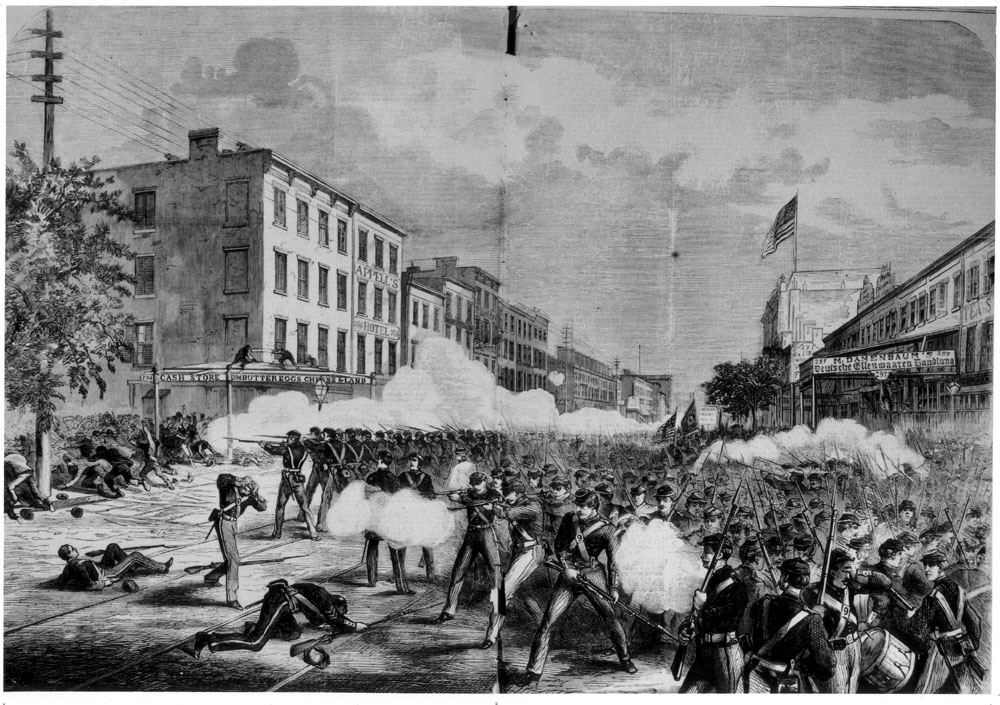
- The Orange Riot of 1871 as depicted in Frank Leslie's Illustrated Newspaper. The view is at 25th Street looking south down Eighth Avenue.
- Date: 1870-1871
- Location: New York City
- Caused by: Sectarianism

Parties
Ulster Scots Protestant rioters	New York City Police Department New York State National Guard	Irish Catholic rioters

Casualties and losses
25 killed	3 killed 46 wounded	33 killed 200+ wounded and/or arrested

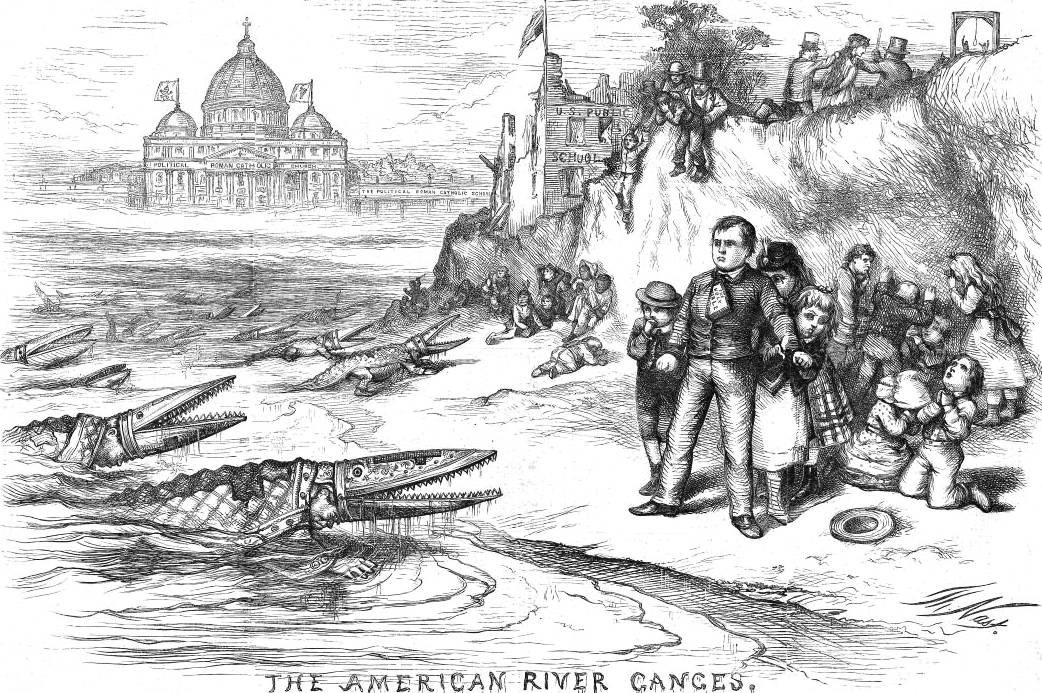
An 1871 cartoon by Thomas Nast, protesting at the political power held by Irish Catholics in New York City; the "crocodiles" are Catholic bishops.

The Orange Riots took place in Manhattan, New York City, in 1870 and 1871, and they involved violent conflict between Irish Protestants who were members of the Orange Order and hence called "Orangemen", and Irish Catholics, along with the New York City Police Department and the New York State National Guard. The riot caused the deaths of over 60 civilians – mostly Irish laborers – and three guardsmen.

== Background ==
On July 12, 1870, an Orange parade was held in Manhattan by Irish Protestants celebrating the victory at the Battle of the Boyne (1689) of King William III (also Prince of Orange), over the former King James II of England (a Catholic, who had been deposed by William III).

The parade route was up Eighth Avenue to Elm Park at 92nd Street. The Orangemen marching through the Irish-Catholic neighborhood of Hell's Kitchen were viewed by the Irish-Catholic residents as a recurring reminder of past and current class oppression. Many of the Irish-Catholic protesters followed the parade and according to statements later made by police, the violence that would follow was premeditated. At the park, the crowd of 200 Irish-Catholic protesters was joined by a group of 300 Irish-Catholic laborers working in the neighborhood, and the parade erupted into violence. Although the police intervened to quell the fighting, 8 people died as a result of the riot.

The following year, the Loyal Order of Orange requested police permission to march again. Fearing another violent incident, the parade was banned by City Police Commissioner James J. Kelso, with the support of William M. Tweed, the head of Tammany Hall, the Democratic Party political machine which controlled the city and the state. Catholic Archbishop John McCloskey applauded the decision.

Protestants objected, as did newspaper editorials in the Herald and Times, a petition signed by Wall Street businessmen, and a cartoon by Thomas Nast in Harper's. Not only was the ban felt to be giving in to the bad behavior of a Catholic mob, but fears were voiced about the growing political power of Irish Catholics, the increasing visibility of Irish nationalism in the city, and the possibility of a radical political action such as occurred in Paris with the Commune.

The pressure generated by these concerns among the city's elite, on top of pressure from good-government reformers against Tweed's regime in general, caused Tammany to reverse course and allow the march; Tammany needed to show that it could control the immigrant Irish population which formed a major part of its electoral power. Governor John T. Hoffman, a Tammany man, rescinded the police commissioner's ban and ordered that the paraders be protected by the city police and the state militia, including cavalry.

== 1871 riot ==
On Wednesday July 12, 1871, the parade proceeded with protection from 1,500 policemen and 5 regiments of the National Guard, about 5,000 men. It was to begin at the Supreme Grand Orange Lodge of the United States headquarters at Lamartine Hall, located at Eighth Avenue and 29th Street. By 1:30 pm, the streets from 21st to 33rd were full of people, mostly Catholic, and mostly laborers, and both sides of the avenue were jammed. The police and militia arrived, to the disapproval of the crowd. The small contingent of Orangemen began their parade down the avenue at 2:00 pm, surrounded by regimental units.

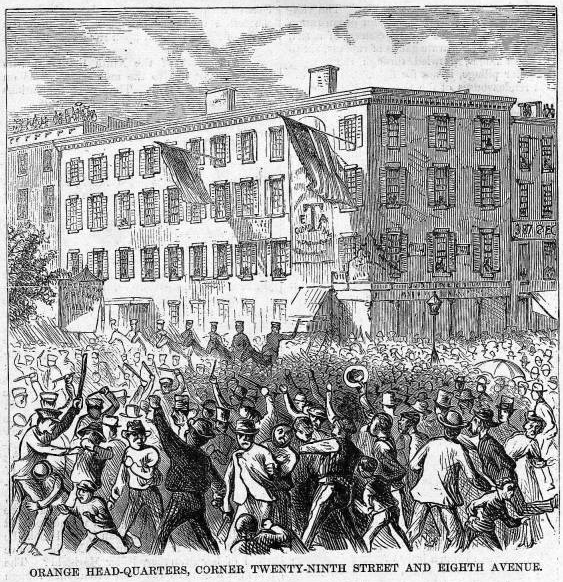
Lamartine Hall, at the corner of Eighth Avenue and 29th Street, on the day of the riot.

The crowd began to pelt the paraders with stones, bricks, bottles, and shoes. Militiamen responded with musket fire, which brought pistol fire from some in the crowd. The police managed to get the parade moving again by charging the crowd and liberally using their clubs. The parade progressed another block but came under fire from thrown missiles again, once again provoking militia shots.

The crush of the crowds prevented more forward motion, and police used their clubs and the militia used their bayonets. Rocks and crockery pelted down on them from the rooftops along the avenue. Troops started firing volleys into the crowd, without being ordered to do so, and the police followed up with mounted charges.

The parade managed to get to 23rd Street, where it turned left and proceeded to Fifth Avenue, where the crowds were supportive of the Orangemen. This changed again when the parade continued south down Fifth and reached the entertainment district below 14th Street, where the crowds were once again hostile. The parade then continued across town to Cooper Union, where the paraders dispersed.

The riot caused the deaths of over 60 civilians – mostly Ulster Scots Protestant and Irish Catholic laborers – and three Guardsmen. Over 150 people were wounded, including 22 militiamen, around 20 policemen injured by thrown missiles, and 4 who were shot, but not fatally. Eighth Avenue was devastated, with one reporter from the New York Herald describing the street as "smeared and slippery with human blood and brains while the land beneath was covered two inches deep with clotted gore, pieces of brain, and the half digested contents of a human stomach and intestines." About 100 people were arrested.

The following day, on July 13, 20,000 mourners paid their respects to the dead outside the morgue at Bellevue Hospital, and funeral processions made their way to Calvary Cemetery in Queens by way of ferries. Governor Hoffman was hanged in effigy by Irish Catholics in Brooklyn, and the events began to be referred to as the "Slaughter on Eighth Avenue."

== Effects ==
Despite their attempt to protect their political power by allowing the parade to go forward, Tammany Hall did not benefit from the outcome, instead coming under increased criticism from newspapers and the city's elite. Tweed fell from power shortly afterwards.

One of the reasons many in the upper and middle classes had grudingly acquiesced in Tammany's hold on power was its presumed ability to maintain political stability. That saving grace was gone: Tweed could not keep the Irish in line. The time had come, said Congregationalist minister Merrill Richardson from the pulpit of his fashionable Madison Avenue church, to take back New York City, for if "the higher classes will not govern, the lower classes will."

Banker Henry Smith told the New York Tribune that "such a lesson was needed every few years. Had one thousand of the rioters been killed, it would have had the effect of completely cowing the remainder."

== See also ==
- Drumcree conflict
- List of incidents of civil unrest in New York City
- List of incidents of civil unrest in the United States
- New York City draft riots
