= St Ambrose Church, Brunswick =

St Ambrose Church
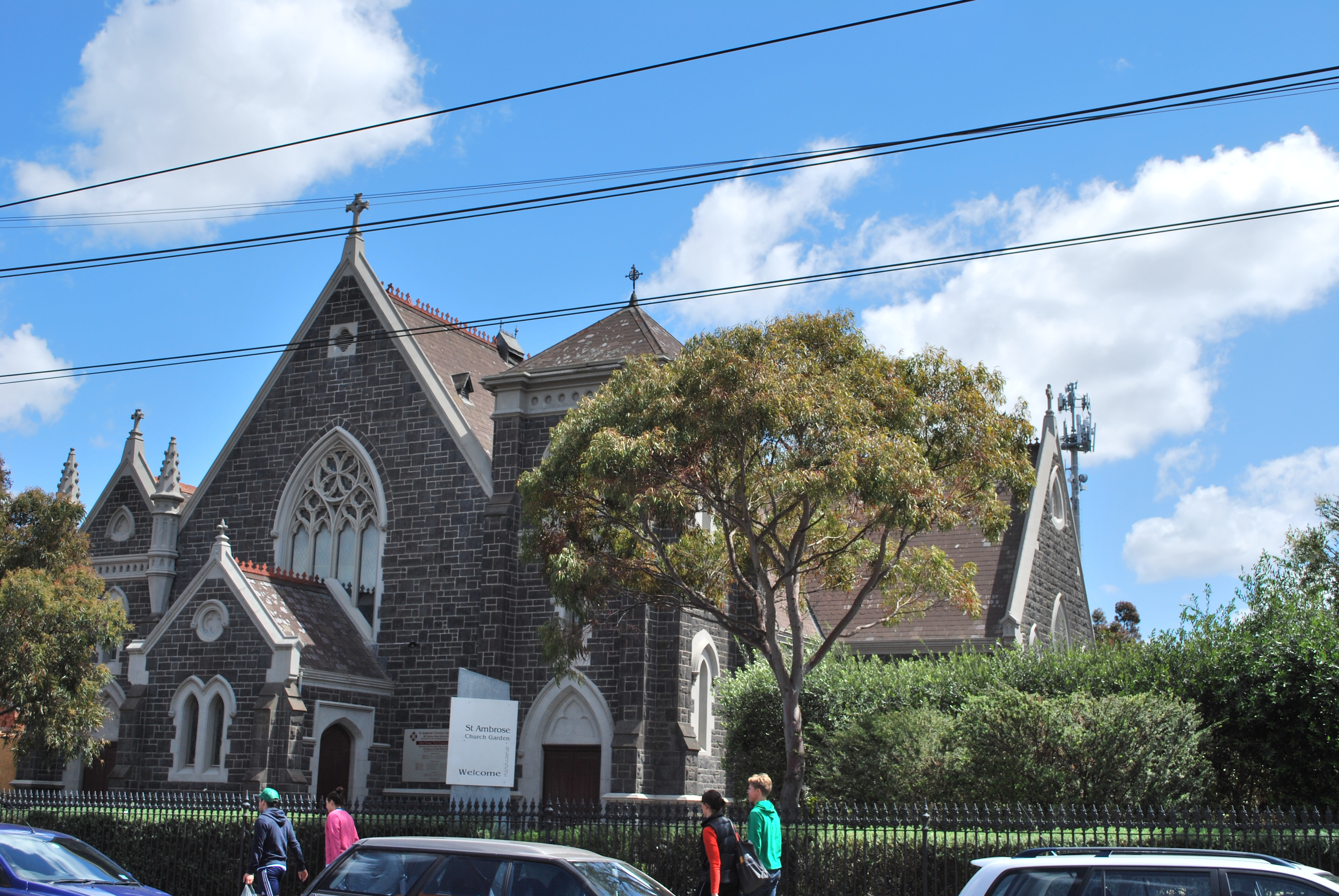
- St Ambrose Church, Brunswick
- St Ambrose Church
- 37°46′16″S 144°57′39″E
- Location: 261 - 289 Sydney Road, Brunswick, Melbourne, Victoria
- Country: Australia
- Denomination: Roman Catholic
- Website: bmcatholiccommunity.org.au/st-ambroses

History
- Status: Church
- Founded: 1869
- Dedication: Saint Ambrose
- Dedicated: 1873

Architecture
- Functional status: Active
- Architectural type: Church
- Style: Gothic Revival
- Construction cost: £6,000

Specifications
- Materials: Bluestone

Administration
- Archdiocese: Melbourne
- Parish: Brunswick and Moreland

Clergy
- Priest: Fr. Michael Casey

St Ambrose Church is a Roman Catholic church located on Sydney Road in Brunswick, a suburb of Melbourne, Victoria, Australia.

== History ==
In the second half of the 19th century, the land where the church building now stands belonged to Mr. Michael Dawson of Brunswick. However, in 1860, it was also used as a camp for nomadic Aboriginals.

In the late 1860s, Dawson donated the land to the Catholic Church for a new church to be built in the neighbourhood. Prior to this, Catholics who lived in Brunswick had to go to Coburg, north of Brunswick, or to the Melbourne central business district, south of Brunswick. The church was named in honour of Saint Ambrose (340–397), who served as the Archbishop of Milan in Italy in the fourth century AD, after an Italian family from Milan who lived in Brunswick suggested it.

The first foundation stone was laid in 1869, with 800 Catholics in attendance. After spending £6,000, the building was completed in 1873.

In 1890, it became a parish church, cut off from the Coburg parish. Nine years later, in 1899, the church building was extended, with additional transepts, a sanctuary, two chapels, a porch and a baptistry. On 19 February 1899 a memorial stone was also added near the northern transept.

During World War I, it was a meeting place for the anti-conscription movement.

The church building was restored in 2000.

== Heritage significance ==
The church building was designed in the Gothic Revival architectural style, with a cruciform plan. The wall are made of bluestone, and the roof is made of timber. There is also an organ dating back to the nineteenth century, and stained glass windows.

The church was added to a non-statutory local government heritage list on an unknown date.
