= Lamartine Place Historic District =

Historic district in Manhattan, New York

Coordinates: 40°45′00″N 73°59′51″W

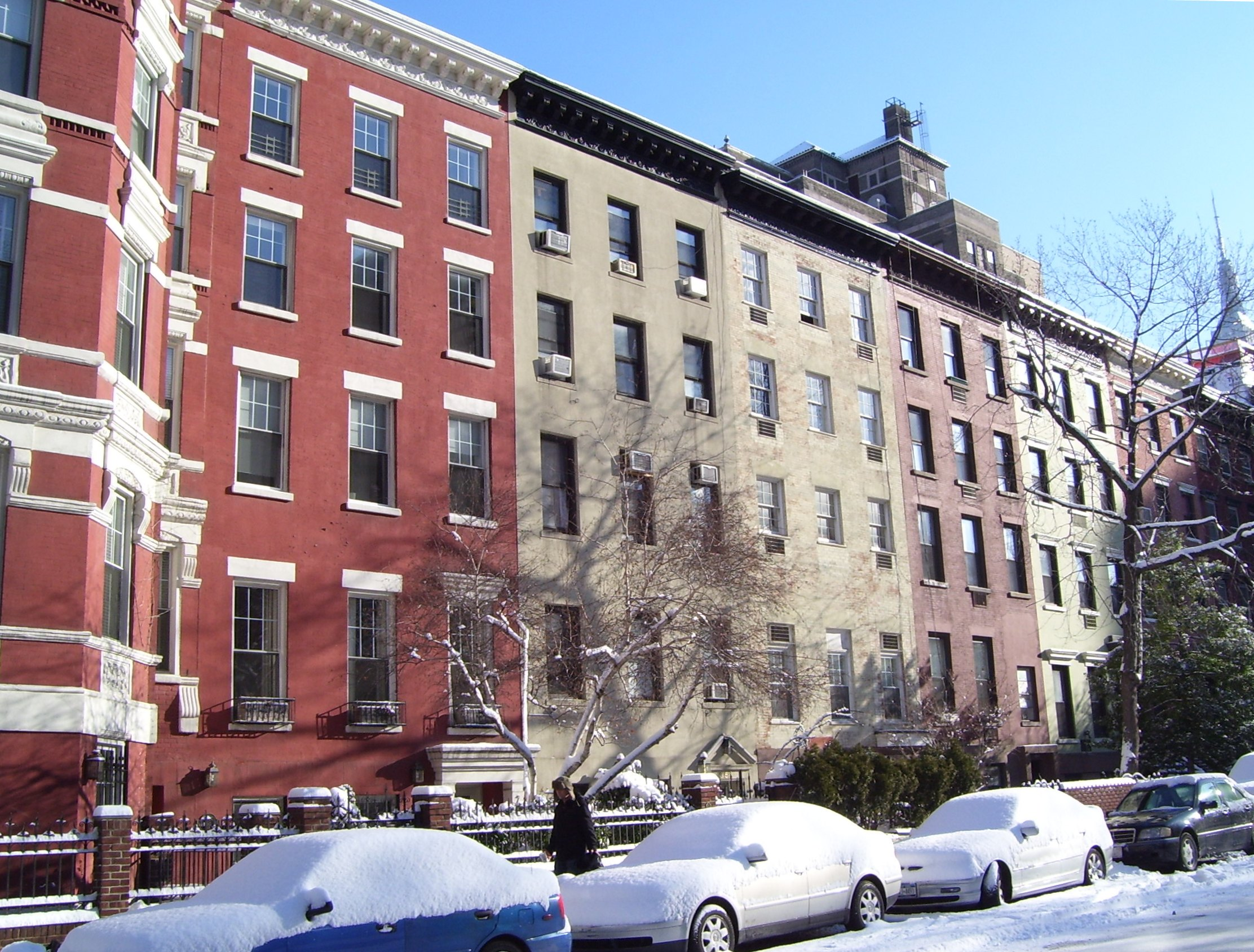
West 29th Street, part of the Lamartine Place Historic District

The Lamartine Place Historic District is a small historic district located between Eighth and Ninth Avenues in the Chelsea neighborhood of Manhattan, New York City. It was designated by the New York City Landmarks Preservation Commission on October 13, 2009, and includes twelve mid-19th century rowhouses on the north side of West 29th Street from number 333 on the east end to number 355 on the west end.

Lamartine Hall, built in 1845, served as the headquarters for the Supreme Grand Orange Lodge of the United States, the American branch of the Orange Order. The Grand Orange Lodge was formally established upon approval from the Grand Orange Lodge of Ireland. The Orange Riots largely took place outside Lamartine Hall.

"Lamartine Place" was a name given to the street by the developers, William Torrey and Cyrus Mason, in order to give their project an identity distinct from the Manhattan street grid. The name honored the French writer, poet and politician Alphonse de Lamartine, who was instrumental in the foundation of the French Second Republic. As part of their efforts, Torrey and Mason constructed a park on the east end of the block, between 28th Street – which they were also developing as "Fitzroy Place" – and 29th Street. The park, which was called Lamartine Park, enhanced the desirability of the townhouses as homes, and this name and Lamartine Place appeared on maps until 1902.

Wanting the same kind of continuity of design they have achieved at their earlier development at London Terrace on 24th Street between Ninth and Tenth Avenues, Torrey and Mason included covenants which limited the types of buildings that could be built on Lamartine Place. The units they built and sold were all Greek Revival rowhouses with consistent heights and setbacks; most of these were completed by 1849, while seven buildings at the western end were not finished until around 1852. Most of the buildings that remain today have been altered since, often with Renaissance revival elements.

== See also ==
- List of New York City Designated Landmarks in Manhattan from 14th to 59th Streets
- Orange Riots
