= James Hamilton, 3rd Baron Hamilton of Strabane =

Irish Confederate soldier (died 1655)

James Hamilton
- Baron Hamilton of Strabane
- Tenure: 1638–1655
- Predecessor: Claud, 2nd Baron H. of Strabane
- Successor: George, 4th Baron H. of Strabane
- Born: 1633
- Died: 16 June 1655
- Spouse(s): unmarried
- Father: Claud, 2nd Baron H. of Strabane
- Mother: Jean Gordon

James Hamilton, 3rd Lord Hamilton, Baron of Strabane (1633–1655) fought against the Cromwellian conquest of Ireland together with his stepfather Phelim O'Neill. In the Siege of Charlemont of 1650, they defended the fort against Coote, but had eventually to surrender. In 1655 Lord Strabane accidentally drowned in the River Mourne near Strabane, aged about 22 and was succeeded by his brother George.

== Birth and origins ==
James was born in 1633 probably at Strabane Castle, as the eldest son of Claude Hamilton and his wife Jean Gordon. His father was the 2nd Baron Hamilton of Strabane, a member of the Strabane cadet branch of the Abercorns. James's mother was the fourth daughter of George Gordon, 1st Marquess of Huntly. His parents had married in 1632. James had one brother and two sister, which are listed in his father's article.

Family tree

James Hamilton with parents and other selected relatives. (Note: This family tree is partly derived from the Abercorn pedigree pictured in Cokayne.) He never married.

James; 1st Earl; 1575–1618	Marion; Boyd d. 1632; Recusant
James; 2nd Earl d. 1670	Claud; 2nd Baron d. 1638	Jean; Gordon	Phelim; O'Neill d. 1653	George; 1st Bt. Donalong d. 1679
George; 3rd Earl c. 1636 – bef. 1683	James; 3rd Baron; 1633–1655	George; 4th Baron; 1636/7 – 1668	Gordon; O'Neill	James c. 1630– 1673
Claud; 4th Earl; 1659–1691	Charles; 5th Earl d. 1701	James; 6th Earl c. 1661 – 1734	Elizabeth; Reading d. 1754

Legend

XXX	Subject of the article	XXX	Earls of Abercorn	XXX	Barons H. of Strabane	XXX	O'Neills

== Baron Strabane ==
Hamilton succeeded his father in 1638 at the age of about five. His mother ran the family estate for the yond Lord Strabane, as he was now, and they continued to live in the Castle of Strabane.

== Irish wars ==
In 1641, when Strabane was about eight years old, the Irish Rebellion broke out. The rebel leader Phelim O'Neill captured and burnt Strabane Castle and took him, his mother, and his siblings captive. Phelim brought them to his castle in Kinard but released them after a few days and sent them to "Sir George Hamilton". This could have been Sir George of Donalong or his great-uncle Sir George Hamilton of Greenlaw and Roscrea.

In 1649, when he was about 16, during the Irish Confederate Wars, Strabane Castle was attacked again, this time by Robert Monro and his Covenanter army. The castle was relieved by Phelim O'Neill, its previous attacker. Phelim married his mother in November. Phelim became his stepfather and his half-brother Gordon O'Neill was born.

In 1649 Oliver Cromwell invaded Ireland with the Parliamentarian forces. On 21 June 1650 the Confederate Ulster Army lost the Battle of Scarrifholis. His stepfather fought in the battle and then fled and escaped capture. In July 1650, aged about 17, Strabane joined his stepfather in his fight against the Parliamentarians. Together with Phelim O'Neill he defended Charlemont Fort in the Siege of Charlemont against Charles Coote, 1st Earl of Mountrath. The fort surrendered to Coote on terms on the 6th or on the 14th of August 1650. The garrison was allowed to march to a port to go overseas into foreign service.

Lord Strabane, however, did not want to leave the country. He therefore escaped and hid in the woods and bogs of the Munterlony mountains where he was captured soon after. He then sought Coote's protection; but in December, he returned to his old cause and took up arms again with Phelim O'Neill. His lands, comprising among others what is today called the Baronscourt Estate, were confiscated. In 1652 Phelim O'Neill was captured. He was tried and convicted for treason in October and executed.

== Death and timeline ==
Strabane drowned in the River Mourne at Ballyfatten near Strabane in 1655, aged about 22. He had never married and was succeeded by his younger brother George as the 4th Baron of Strabane.

Timeline
Age	Date	Event
0	1633	Born, probably at Strabane Castle.
4–5	1638, 14 Jun	Father died.
7–8	1641	Strabane Castle burned by Phelim O'Neill.
12–13	1646, 5 Jun	Battle of Benburb
15–16	1649, 30 Jan	King Charles I beheaded.
15–16	1649	Strabane Castle attacked by Robert Monro but relieved by Phelim.
15–16	1649, Nov	Mother married Phelim O'Neill.
16–17	1650, 21 Jun	Stepfather fought at Scarrifholis where the Confederate Ulster Army was defeated by Coote.
16–17	1650, Jul	Defended Charlemont Fort with his stepfather against Coote.
16–17	1650, Aug	He and Phelim surrendered Charlemont Fort to Coote on terms.
19–20	1653, 10 Mar	Stepfather executed.
21–22	1655, 16 Jun	Died by accidental drowning in the River Mourne

== Notes and references ==
=== Sources ===
- Bagwell, Richard (1909). Ireland under the Stuarts and under the Interregnum. Vol. II. London: Longmans, Green, and Co. OCLC 458582656. – 1642 to 1660 (for Scarrisholis and Charlemont)
- Cokayne, George Edward (1892). Complete Peerage of England, Scotland, Ireland, Great Britain and the United Kingdom, Extant, Extinct, or Dormant. Vol. IV (1st ed.). London: George Bell and Sons. OCLC 1180828941. – G to K (for Hamilton of Strabane)
- Cokayne, George Edward (1910). Gibbs, Vicary (ed.). The complete peerage of England, Scotland, Ireland, Great Britain and the United Kingdom, extant, extinct, or dormant. Vol. I (2nd ed.). London: St Catherine Press. OCLC 228661424. – Ab-Adam to Basing (for Abercorn)
- Duffy, Seán (2002). The Illustrated History of Ireland. New York: Contemporary Books. ISBN 0-8092-2437-2.
- Fryde, Edmund Boleslaw; Greenway, D. E.; Porter, S.; Roy, I., eds. (1986). Handbook of British Chronology. Royal Historical Society Guides and Handbooks, No. 2 (3rd ed.). London: Offices of the Royal Historical Society. ISBN 0-86193-106-8. – (for timeline)
- Graham, Rev. John (1841). Ireland Preserved; or the Siege of Londonderry and the Battle of Aughrim with Lyrical Poetry and Biographical Notes (2nd ed.). Dublin: Hardy and Walker. OCLC 00992682. – Short biographies in the biographical notes
- Hill, Rev. George (1877). An Historical Account of the Plantation in Ulster at the Commencement of the Seventeenth Century, 1608–1620. Dublin: McCaw Stevenson and Orr. OCLC 32638560.
- Paul, Sir James Balfour (1904). The Scots Peerage, Founded on Wood's Edition of Sir Robert Douglas's Peerage of Scotland. Vol. I. Edinburgh: David Douglas. OCLC 505064285. – Abercorn to Balmerino (for Abercorn)
- Webb, Alfred (1878). "O'Neill, Sir Felim". Compendium of Irish Biography. Dublin: M. H. Gill & Son. pp. 416–418. OCLC 122693688.

Peerage of Ireland
Preceded by Claud Hamilton	Baron Hamilton of Strabane; 1638–1655	Succeeded by George Hamilton
