= George Hamilton, 4th Baron Hamilton of Strabane =

Irish baron (died 1668)

George Hamilton
- Baron Hamilton of Strabane
- Tenure: 1655–1668
- Predecessor: James, 3rd Baron H. of Strabane
- Successor: Claud, 4th Earl of Abercorn
- Died: 14 April 1668
- Spouse: Elizabeth Fagan
- Issue Detail: Claud, Charles, & others
- Father: Claud, 2nd Baron H. of Strabane
- Mother: Jean Gordon

George Hamilton, 4th Baron Hamilton of Strabane (died 1668) was the younger son of Claud Hamilton, 2nd Baron Hamilton of Strabane. He succeeded to the title in 1655 when his brother drowned while bathing in the River Mourne. After the Restoration, he obtained the return of the family lands around Strabane, which had been confiscated by the Parliamentarians in 1650.

== Birth and origins ==
George was born in 1636 or 1637, probably at Strabane Castle. He was the younger son of Claude Hamilton and his wife Jean Gordon. His father was the 2nd Baron Hamilton of Strabane and a member of the Strabane cadet branch of the Abercorns. The lords of Strabane owned much land around Strabane and Baronscourt in County Tyrone.

Family tree

George Hamilton with wife, parents, and other selected relatives. (Note: This family tree is partly derived from the Abercorn pedigree pictured in Cokayne. Also see the lists of siblings and children in the text.)

James; 1st Earl; 1575–1618	Marion; Boyd d. 1632; Recusant
James; 2nd Earl d. 1670	Claud; 2nd Baron d. 1638	Jean; Gordon	Phelim; O'Neill d. 1653	George; 1st Baronet; Donalong d. 1679
George; 3rd Earl c. 1636 – bef. 1683	James; 3rd Baron; 1633–1655	George; 4th Baron; 1636/7 – 1668	Elizabeth; Fagan	James c. 1630–1673
Claud; 4th Earl; 1659–1691	Charles; 5th Earl d. 1701	James; 6th Earl c. 1661–1734
James; 7th Earl; 1686–1744

Legend

XXX	Subject of the article	XXX	Earls of Abercorn	XXX	Barons H. of Strabane	XXX	O'Neills

George's mother was the fourth daughter of George Gordon, 1st Marquess of Huntly in Scotland. His parents were both Catholic. They married in 1632. He was one of four siblings, who are listed in his father's article.

== Father's death ==
In 1638, while George was still an infant, his father died and was buried in the church of Leckpatrick near Strabane. His older brother James succeeded as the 3rd Baron Hamilton of Strabane as a young child. His mother ran the family estate and they continued to live in the Castle of Strabane.

== Irish wars ==
In 1641, when George was about four years old, the Irish Rebellion broke out. The rebel leader Phelim O'Neill captured and burned Strabane Castle and took him, together with his mother and siblings, as prisoners to Kinard, his usual place of residence. Phelim released his prisoners after some days and sent them to Sir George Hamilton, one of George's uncles.

In 1649, when George was about 12, during the Irish Confederate Wars, Strabane Castle was attacked again, this time by Robert Monro and his Covenanter army. The castle was relieved by Phelim O'Neill, its previous attacker. Phelim married George's mother in November. Phelim became his stepfather and his half-brother Gordon O'Neill was born in due course.

In 1649 Oliver Cromwell invaded Ireland with the Parliamentarian forces. In July 1650, in the Siege of Charlemont, his brother and his stepfather defended Charlemont Fort with remnants of the Confederate Ulster army against a Parliamentarian army under Charles Coote. Having resisted several attacks, the fort finally surrendered to Coote on terms in August and the garrison was allowed to march away. In July 1650, the family's lands were confiscated by the Parliamentarians. In 1652 Phelim O'Neill was captured. He was tried and convicted for treason in October and executed.

== Brother's succession ==
In June 1655 his brother, James, drowned in the River Mourne at Ballyfathen, aged about 22. His brother had never married and George succeeded him as the 4th Baron Hamilton of Strabane. He is usually called Lord Strabane rather than Lord Hamilton to avoid confusion with the Lords Hamilton of the senior, Scottish, branch of the family.

== Marriage and children ==
George married in or before 1659 Elizabeth Fagan, daughter of Christopher Fagan of Feltrim, County Dublin, and of Anne, daughter of Sir Nicholas White of Leixlip Castle. Christopher Fagan had lost his estates during the Cromwellian conquest of Ireland but would get them back in 1663 as an "innocent papist" in the terms of the Act of Settlement 1662. Elizabeth would eventually turn out to be a rich heiress, the only surviving child after the deaths of her two brothers.

George and Elizabeth had two sons:

1. Claud (1659–1691), succeeded him as the 4th Earl of Abercorn
2. Charles (died 1701), became the 5th Earl of Abercorn

—and two daughters:

1. Anne (died 1680), married John Browne of the Neale, County Mayo
2. Mary (born 1668 or 1669), born after her father's death, and would marry as his second wife Garrett Dillon, Recorder of Dublin

== Restoration ==
After the Restoration (1660), Lord Strabane, as he was now, obtained the return of most of the family lands, which had been confiscated in 1650 by the Parliamentarians. Although his brother James had fought with Phelim O'Neill's Confederates rather than with the royalists, his brother had fought against the Parliamentarians, not against the royalists and, Lord Strabane, being born about 1636, was too young to have been involved in the atrocities of 1641. His brother's lands were therefore restored to him as an "innocent papist" on 16 May 1663.

== Death, succession, and timeline ==
He died on 14 April 1668 at Kenure House, Rush, County Dublin, and was buried at nearby St. Mechlin's Church. He was succeeded by his eldest son Claud as 5th Baron Hamilton of Strabane, who in about 1680 became the 4th Earl of Abercorn.

Timeline
As his birth date is uncertain, so are all his ages.
Age	Date	Event
0	1636 or 1637	Born, probably at Strabane Castle.
0–1	1638, 14 Jun	Father died.
3–4	1641	His home, Strabane Castle, burned by Phelim O'Neill.
11–12	1649, 30 Jan	King Charles I beheaded.
11–12	1649	His home, Strabane Castle, attacked by Robert Monro relieved by Phelim.
11–12	1649, Nov	Mother married Phelim O'Neill.
12–13	1650	Estates were confiscated by the Parliamentarians.
15–16	1653, 10 Mar	Stepfather executed.
17–18	1655, 16 Jun	Succeeded his drowned brother as the 4th Lord Strabane.
21–22	1659, in or before	Married Elizabeth Fagan.
22–23	1660, 29 May	Restoration of King Charles II
22–23	1663, 16 May	Obtained return of the estates at Strabane.
30–31	1668, 14 Apr	Died at Kenure House, Rush, County Dublin.

== Notes and references ==
=== Sources ===
- Brewer, James Norris (1829). A History of Leinster: Embracing the beauties of Dublin, Wicklow, Wexford, Kilkenny &c. &c. London: J. S. Taylor & Co. OCLC 875191110.
- Burke, Bernard; Burke, Ashworth Peter (1915). A Genealogical and Heraldic History of the Peerage and Baronetage, the Privy Council, Knightage and Companionage (77th ed.). London: Harrison. OCLC 1155471554.
- Cokayne, George Edward (1896). Complete Peerage of England, Scotland, Ireland, Great Britain and the United Kingdom, Extant, Extinct, or Dormant. Vol. VII (1st ed.). London: George Bell and Sons. OCLC 1180891114. – S to T (for Hamilton of Strabane)
- Cokayne, George Edward (1910). Gibbs, Vicary (ed.). The complete peerage of England, Scotland, Ireland, Great Britain and the United Kingdom, extant, extinct, or dormant. Vol. I (2nd ed.). London: St Catherine Press. OCLC 228661424. – Ab-Adam to Basing (for Abercorn)
- Cokayne, George Edward (1953). White, G. H. (ed.). The complete peerage of England, Scotland, Ireland, Great Britain and the United Kingdom, extant, extinct, or dormant. Vol. XII, part 1 (2nd ed.). London: St Catherine Press. – Skemersdale to Towton (snippet view, for Strabane)
- Fryde, Edmund Boleslaw; Greenway, D. E.; Porter, S.; Roy, I., eds. (1986). Handbook of British Chronology. Royal Historical Society Guides and Handbooks, No. 2 (3rd ed.). London: Offices of the Royal Historical Society. ISBN 0-86193-106-8. – (for timeline)
- Graham, Rev. John (1841). Ireland Preserved; or the Siege of Londonderry and the Battle of Aughrim with Lyrical Poetry and Biographical Notes (2nd ed.). Dublin: Hardy and Walker. OCLC 00992682. – Short biographies in the biographical notes
- Lodge, John (1789). Archdall, Mervyn (ed.). The Peerage of Ireland or, A Genealogical History of the Present Nobility of that Kingdom. Vol. V. Dublin: James Moore. OCLC 264906028. – Viscounts
- Paul, Sir James Balfour (1904). The Scots Peerage, Founded on Wood's Edition of Sir Robert Douglas's Peerage of Scotland. Vol. I. Edinburgh: David Douglas. OCLC 505064285. – Abercorn to Balmerino
- Webb, Alfred (1878). "O'Neill, Sir Felim". Compendium of Irish Biography. Dublin: M. H. Gill & Son. pp. 416–418. OCLC 122693688.

Peerage of Ireland
Preceded by James Hamilton	Baron Hamilton of Strabane; 1655–1668	Succeeded by Claud Hamilton
