= Richard O'Farrell (Irish Confederate) =

Richard O'Farrell was an Irish soldier of the seventeenth century most notable for his service in the Irish Confederate Wars from 1642 to 1651. He rose to the rank of Lieutenant General.

Like many other Irish officers in the decades following the Flight of the Earls in 1607, O'Farrell served in the Spanish Army. He was commissioned into an Irish Regiment and developed battle experience while serving under the veteran Owen Roe O'Neill.

In 1641, a major rebellion broke out in Ireland, led by northern Catholics such as Sir Phelim O'Neill and Lord Maguire. While continuing to pledge allegiance to Charles I, they launched attacks on Protestant inhabitants. While much of Ulster and Connaught was seized, an attempt to capture Dublin failed. O'Farrell was one of many exiled officers who returned to join the army of the rebels, who established their own government in Kilkenny.

He arrived at Wexford in the company of Rosa O'Neill and Henry Roe O'Neill, the wife and daughter of his former commander Owen Roe O'Neill. Although appointed Colonel of a Longford regiment, O'Farrell's men were soon attached to the Ulster Army of O'Neill. In 1646, he commanded his regiment during O'Neill's victory at the Battle of Benburb. During the Siege of Dublin, O'Farrell was routed by troops led by Lord Inchiquin while attempting to bring a relief convoy to the beleaguered garrison of Dundalk.

General Farrell was called upon to defend the besieged city of Waterford Siege of Waterford. Having isolated Waterford from the east and north, Cromwell arrived before the city on 24 November 1649. However, Waterford still had access to reinforcements from the west and up to 3,000 Irish soldiers (from the Confederate's Ulster Army) under General Richard Farrell were fed into the city in the course of a week. Farrell, having been a successful officer in the Spanish army, was highly trained and experienced in siege warfare from battles in Flanders. Cromwell had come up against a superior minded soldier and commander, and could not himself take the city. Eventually Cromwell had to call off the first siege on 2 December and go into winter quarters at Dungarvan.

When Owen Roe died in 1649, O'Farrell was one of the candidates to replace him as commander of the Ulster Army, although he did not receive the post. He fought at the Battle of Scarrifholis the following year, which ended in the destruction of the army. While many other officers were captured or killed, O'Farrell managed to escape and took shelter in Charlemont with Sir Phelim O'Neill.

He surrendered to the English Republican forces in 1652. After a period of imprisonment he was allowed to leave for Spain. He returned to service in the Spanish Army, fighting against France. He later unsuccessfully tried to gain a command in the Imperial Army at Vienna.

== Bibliography ==
- Casway, Jerrold I. Owen Roe O'Neill and the Struggle for Catholic Ireland. University of Pennsylvania Press, 1984.
- Hollick, Clive. The Battle of Benburb 1646. Mercier Press, 2011.
- Examination of Lt. Generall ffarell MS815, fols 441r-442v 1641 Depositions Trinity College Library Dublin - relating to the taking of Dysert Castle, Queen's Co., and the killing of Major John Pigott and many others.
