= Battle of Glenmaquin =

Battle during the Eleven Years' War

Coordinates: 54.9056°N 7.6661°W

- Part of the Irish Confederate Wars
Date	16 June 1642
Location	Glenmaquin, County Donegal
Result	Crown victory

Belligerents
Kingdom of Ireland: Laggan Army	Irish Confederates

Commanders and leaders
Sir Robert Stewart	Sir Felim O'Neill

Strength
2,000	6,000

Casualties and losses
Low	500

Ireland and Glenmaquin

The Battle of Glenmaquin was a brief battle on 16 June 1642 during the Eleven Years' War. It was fought between the Royalist Laggan Army commanded by Sir Robert Stewart and Irish Confederate forces commanded by Sir Felim O'Neill. The battle ended in a decisive victory for the Laggan Army with the Confederate forces suffering heavy losses.

== Background ==
As a result of the violence that erupted against Protestants in Ireland after the start of the Irish Rebellion of 1641, numerous settler militias were formed. One of the militias created during this period, the Laggan Army, took its name from the fertile farmland of the Laggan Valley in east County Donegal.

In the late spring of 1642, Sir Felim O'Neill, a principal organiser of the initial coup and commander of the Irish Ulster Army, assembled a large Confederate army reinforced by the MacDonnells of Antrim and invaded the Laggan Valley.

== The armies ==
=== The Laggan Army ===
At the outset of the Irish Rebellion of 1641, thousands of Protestant settlers were evicted from their lands. Their homes were burned and their possessions taken. The settlers became homeless refugees and were mercilessly hunted down and murdered by the Confederates. Thousands of the Protestant refugees sought safety and protection in Royalist strongholds or attempted to leave Ireland and return to England and Scotland.

Wealthy Protestant landowners in northwest Ulster such as Sir William Stewart and his brother Sir Robert Stewart chose to defend their properties by organizing militias. The Stewarts were Scottish settlers who had served King Charles I of England in the military. During the colonization of Ulster King Charles awarded English and Scottish loyalists such as the Stewarts with large tracts of escheated land under the condition that improvements be made and tenant settlers be brought over from England or Scotland.

The Stewarts were held in such high regard by the English Crown that immediately after the outbreak of the rebellion, King Charles authorized both of the Stewarts to establish a regiment of 1,000 foot and a troop of horse for the king’s service. The military force that the Stewarts created came to be known as the Laggan Army. Originally the unit was formed to protect the Laggan Valley in eastern Donegal along with the northwest portions of counties Tyrone and Londonderry. As the war progressed, the Laggan Army became the most dominant Royalist militia in Ulster, defending and relieving Protestant strongholds; escorting refugees to safe havens; conducting reprisal attacks on the Confederates; and supporting other Royalist militias in numerous conflicts. William Stewart served as the nominal leader of the Laggan Army in the beginning as he had greater seniority and landed interests than his brother. Fairly quickly, however, Robert Stewart was selected for overall command based upon his extensive experience in the Thirty Years' War on the European continent. Robert Stewart was resourceful and proved to be adept at recruiting men and training military units. His troops were better equipped than the Confederates they faced especially with respect to muskets. And perhaps most important of all, Stewart was both experienced and knowledgeable with regard to battlefield tactics.

=== Felim’s Confederate army ===
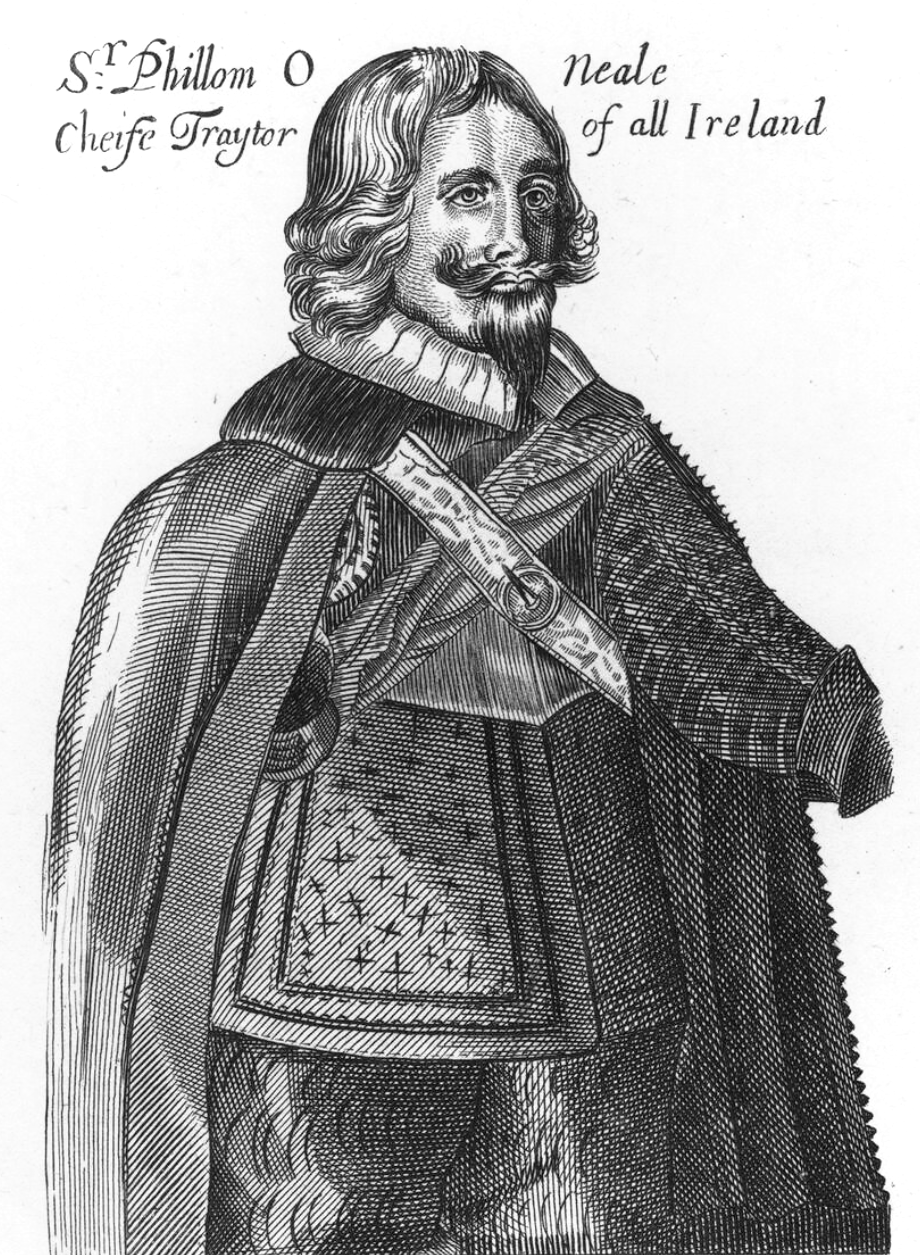
Sir Felim O'Neill

In contrast to the Protestant militias, the Confederate military during the early stages of its existence was relatively undisciplined and poorly trained. This was partly due to Felim O'Neill's lack of military experience, but also the Irish soldiers' tendencies to attack British civilians and plunder their possessions rather than fight the enemy forces.

In the late spring of 1642, Felim decided to invade Donegal. It’s not entirely clear why he chose to directly confront the Laggan Army at that time. Felim’s military record in the field was spotty with more defeats than victories. Support for the rebellion among the local Irish lords was weak in counties Donegal and Londonderry compared to the enthusiasm across the rest of Ulster. Felim may have believed that confronting the Laggan Army would gain him the support of the hesitant Irish lords. Alternatively, he may have believed that he could defeat the Laggan Army and then conquer northwest Ulster including the undefended Royalist stronghold and port city of Londonderry. Or perhaps Felim was caught in a trap and had no other alternative in that the eastern counties of Ulster were held by Sir Robert Monro, commander of a Scottish expeditionary force, who was sent to protect Protestant civilians.

Carrying through with his decision, Felim joined forces with the MacDonnells of Antrim in early June and marched west toward Donegal with an army estimated to be as large as 6,000 foot and several hundred horse. Also supporting Felim in the invasion of Donegal was Alasdair Mac Colla, the Scottish military officer who defected to the side of the Irish Confederates in early 1642.

== The battle ==
On 14 June, Felim crossed the river Foyle and entered Donegal seeking an engagement with the Laggan Army. Stewart was aware of the approach of the Confederates and had his force of 2,000 ready but chose not to immediately attack. Stewart withdrew, drawing Felim in to a place where the Laggan Army would have an advantage. The following night the two armed forces gathered a few hundred meters apart on the opposite sides of a valley near the small village of Glenmaquin. Stewart prepared for battle by having his men build defensive works. Felim, planning to take the offense, chose not to construct any fortification.

The next morning, Felim assembled his army and formed the infantry up along two lines. The Laggan Army took positions behind their defensive structures. Out of musket range and without artillery, the two armies stood facing each other, waiting for the other side to make the first move. Stewart chose to act, sending a small vanguard of sharpshooters partway across the field to attack the Confederates, goading them to react. The Confederates reacted as Stewart hoped they would, charging downhill, full force. The forward detachment retreated to the Laggan defensive position with the Confederates at their heels. As the Confederates reached the Laggan fortifications, the main body of the Royalist militia opened fire with their muskets. Caught in the open, the first line of the Confederate force took heavy casualties. Unable to advance, the Confederates broke and attempted to flee.

Stewart then pressed forward with a counter-attack. This caused the first line of the Confederates to retreat in such disorder that they collided with the second line which was attempting to advance. All this chaos and confusion caused the second line of the Confederates to panic and break despite the commands of Felim and his officers. As the Confederates fled in all directions, Stewart unleashed his cavalry to pursue those on the run.

For Felim it was a horrendous loss. In addition to common soldiers, many officers including Donnell Gorm MacDonnell, an Antrim chieftain, were lost. Casualties were heavily weighted on the side of the Confederates. Laggan losses are unknown but were significantly lower than the 500 estimated casualties of the Confederates. Felim’s losses would have been even higher had not Alasdair MacColla and his force of Antrim Scots interceded in the pursuit of Felim’s fleeing army.

== Aftermath ==
In the days after the battle, Felim returned eighty kilometers east back to his headquarters at Charlemont in County Armagh. The Irish army was demoralised by the defeat and many returned to their homes, having lost faith in O'Neill as an effective leader of the Ulster Army.

The Laggan Army continued to operate against the Confederate forces in the province. However, the arrival of experienced Irish general Owen Roe O'Neill in 1642 to take command of the Ulster Army brought increased training and discipline to the Irish Ulster Army. Despite gaining a victory over Owen Roe at the Battle of Clones in 1643, in the following years the Irish military began to gain ground and the Laggan army along with their Scottish Covenanter allies were decisively defeated by the Irish forces at the Battle of Benburb in 1646.

== See also ==
- Confederate Ireland
- Irish battles
