= Laggan Army =

Militia in the Plantation of Ulster during the Irish Rebellion of 1641

Ulster in Ireland (dark green)

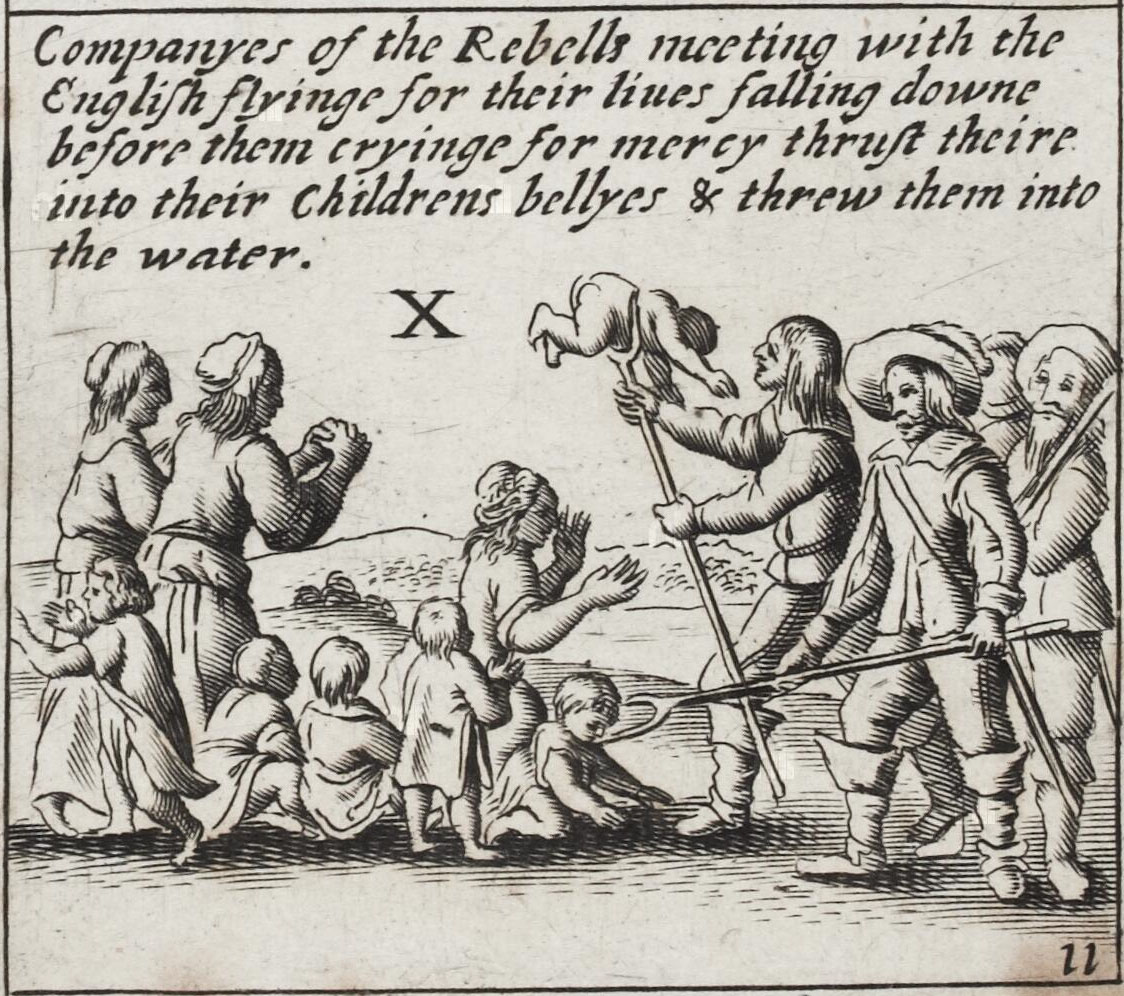
Depicting an atrocity committed upon civilians during the Irish Rebellion of 1641 by Irish

The Laggan Army, sometimes referred to as the Lagan Army, was a militia formed by Protestant settlers in the fertile Laggan district in the east of County Donegal in Ulster, during the time of the Irish Rebellion of 1641.

== Background ==
Following the defeat of Gaelic Ireland after the Nine Years War and the Flight of the Earls in 1607, the colonization of Ulster began in 1609. English and Scottish settlers, supported by the Crown, started to colonize the north-east province of Ulster. The settlers largely settled on land which was confiscated from Gaelic chiefs in Ulster, many of whom had fled from Ireland following the Irish defeat in the Nine Years' War.

In 1641, the Irish rose up in a rebellion led by Felim O'Neill. This coup's purposes included putting an end to anti-Catholic discrimination, greater Irish self-governance, and to partially or fully reverse the plantations of Ireland. Although it was intended to be bloodless, the rebellion was characterized by rebel atrocities against Protestant settlers. While O'Neill himself was opposed to these attacks he was unable to control the Irish rebels under his command.

At the outset of the rebellion, thousands of Protestant settlers were evicted from their lands. Their homes were burned and their possessions taken. Most attacks involved robberies and assaults, however if the settlers resisted they were often murdered by the Irish rebels. Thousands of the Protestant refugees sought safety and protection in Royalist strongholds or attempted to leave Ireland and return to England and Scotland.

Protestant militias along with English and Scottish soldiers replied with brutal reprisals. Often after rebels surrendered, they were given no quarter. Reports of the violence against the Protestants were widely exaggerated in press reports in Britain. Initially, Parliamentarian propaganda pamphlets claimed over 200,000 Protestants were killed, which was widely believed despite the fact that the estimates being stated were almost twice the number of Protestants living in Ireland at the time. On 3 April 1642, a Scottish Covenanter expeditionary army landed in Ulster to protect the Planter population. Prior to that Protestants had to defend themselves by means of militias such as the Laggan Army. Afterwards the Laggan Army continued to operate in Ulster, and often participated in joint campaigns with the Scottish expeditionary force.

Eventually, violence against civilians by both sides began to calm, mainly due to the arrival of Eoghan Ruadh O'Néill, an experienced Irish general who had served under the Spanish in Flanders in the Eighty Years' War. He landed in Ireland in 1642 along with several other Gaelic Irish and Old English officers, an example of the latter being Thomas Preston. Due to their experience they were given positions of command within the Confederate military. O'Neill began disciplining the troops of the Irish Ulster Army and hanged soldiers who attacked civilians. In turn, reprisals by Protestants also declined.

== Creation of the Laggan Army ==
Wealthy Protestant landowners in northwest Ulster such as Sir William Cole, Sir William Stewart and his brother Sir Robert Stewart chose to defend their properties by organizing militias. The Stewarts were Scottish settlers who had served King Charles I of England in the military. During the colonization of Ulster, King Charles awarded English and Scottish loyalists such as the Stewarts with large tracts of escheated land under the condition that improvements be made and tenant settlers be brought over from England or Scotland.

The Stewarts were held in such high regard by the Crown that immediately after the outbreak of the rebellion, King Charles authorized both of the Stewarts to establish a regiment of 1,000 foot and a troop of horse for the king's service. The military force that the Stewarts created came to be known as the Laggan Army. Originally the unit was formed to protect the Laggan Valley in eastern Donegal along with the northwest portions of counties Tyrone and Londonderry. As the war progressed, the Laggan Army became the most dominant Royalist militia in Ulster, defending and relieving Protestant strongholds; escorting refugees to safe havens; conducting reprisal attacks on the Irish rebels; and supporting other Royalist militias in numerous conflicts.

William Stewart served as the nominal leader of the Laggan Army in the beginning as he had greater seniority and landed interests than his brother. Fairly quickly, however, Robert Stewart was selected for overall command based upon his extensive experience from the Thirty Years' War on the European continent. Robert Stewart was resourceful and proved to be adept at recruiting men and training military units. His troops were better equipped than the rebels they faced especially with respect to muskets. Stewart was both experienced and knowledgeable with regard to battlefield tactics.

== Warfare ==
On 16 June 1642, the Laggan Army confronted and defeated a large Confederate Irish force commanded by Phelim O'Neill at the battle of Glenmaquin, near Raphoe. The Confederates were invading County Donegal intent upon bringing northwestern Ulster and the Royalist stronghold and port city of Derry under their control, however the Laggan Army routed them and then went on to capture a number of towns in Ulster ending the Confederate threat in the region for the time.

The Laggan Army continued to serve in King Charles' service during the time of the First English Civil War and the Eleven Years' War. On 13 June 1643, Robert Stewart and the Laggan defeated General Owen O'Neill and the Confederates at the Battle of Clones and on 8 July 1645 the Laggan Army assisted Sir Charles Coote and the Parliamentarians capture Sligo.

In 1646, the Laggan Army was one of three forces including Scottish Covenanter regiments and English settler armies commanded by Robert Monro that was to be included in an attack on Owen Roe O'Neill and the Confederates in Ulster. The Laggan Army was in Clogher on its way to meet up with Monro's force on 4 June when Monro's Scottish Covenanter and settler militia force was confronted and decisively defeated by Irish general Owen Roe O'Neill at the Battle of Benburb. After the battle, the Laggan Army retreated back to Derry and Enniskillen to prepare for a potential attack when the Confederates travelled west to Clones.

After the failed siege of Derry in 1649, the Laggan Army started to break apart. Factions transferred their allegiance to the side of the Parliamentarians and eventually fought against their compatriots at the battles of Lisnagarvey, Scarrifholis, and Charlemont. By the end of 1649, the Laggan Army had ceased to be effective as a fighting force due to internal ethnic divisions and as a result the force disbanded.

== General references ==
- "The Laggan and its People" (PDF). donegalgenealogy.com. Ballyshannon: Donegal Democrat Ltd.
