= Turlough McHenry O'Neill =

Irish landowner (died 1608)

Sir Turlough McHenry O'Neill (died 1608) is known for having been killed together with his father, Henry, fighting for the crown in O'Doherty's rebellion and for being the father of Felim O'Neill of Kinard, who started the Irish Rebellion of 1641.

== Birth and origins ==
Family tree

Turlough O'Neill with his wife, parents, and other selected relatives. (Note: This family tree is based on a two graphic trees showing the Kinard O'Neills.)

Henry; O'Neill d. 1579	Hugh; Earl of Tyrone c. 1550 – 1616
Henry Og; O'Neill d. 1608	Cortine	Turlough; MacHenry; O'Neill of Fews
Turlough; O'Neill d. 1608	Catherine	Robert; Hovenden
Claud; 2nd Baron d. 1638	Jean; Gordon	Phelim; O'Neill; 1604–1653	Robert; Hovenden
James; 3rd Baron; 1633–1655	Gordon; O'Neill

Legend

XXX	Subject of the article	XXX	O'Neills of Kinard	XXX	Earl of Tyrone	XXX	Barons; Strabane

Turlough was a son of Henry Oge O'Neill and his wife Cortine (or Catherine) O'Neill. Turlogh's father was called "oge" (cf. Irish óg, young) to distinguish him from Turlough's grandfather who was also named Henry O'Neill. His father was the head of the O'Neills of Kinard, who were a cadet branch that parted from the O'Neill More when Turlough's great-grandfather Shane O'Neill (died 1517), a younger son of Conn More O'Neill, King of Tir Eoghan, received Kinard as appanage.

His mother was a daughter of Hugh O'Neill, Earl of Tyrone. Both parents were thus part of the Gaelic O'Neill Dynasty of Ulster.

== Tyrone's Rebellion ==
Turlough's branch of the family had served on the Crown's side against Tyrone during the Nine Years' War (1594-1603). They were rewarded by having their land at Kinnard, County Tyrone, granted to them directly by the crown, outside of Tyrone's overlordship. Turlogh was knighted on 17 April 1604 at Rheban Castle by George Carey (c. 1541 – 1616), who had for a short time been lord deputy under Mountjoy, Lord Lieutenant, in 1603.

== O'Doherty's Rebellion and death ==
In 1608 he and his father Henry were both killed during O'Doherty's Rebellion. Sir Cahir O'Doherty had, like them, been a loyalist to the Crown, but was driven into rebellion by the treatment he received from local officials, mainly from Sir George Paulet, governor of Derry. On 19 April 1608 he took Derry by surprise in what is called the Burning of Derry. Some of his supporters killed Paulet. His forces then rampaged across Ulster attacking those who would not join him. His men attacked Kinnard, burned it and killed O'Neill and his father. O'Doherty was eventually defeated and killed in July at the decisive Battle of Kilmacrennan in County Donegall.

Sir Turlough was succeeded by his young son Sir Phelim O'Neill. His widow Catherine remarried to Robert Hovendon, a Catholic of recent English origin, who was stepfather to Sir Phelim. Their son, also called Robert Hovenden, joined Sir Phelim when he launched the Irish Rebellion of 1641.

== Notes and references ==
=== Sources ===
- Casway, Jerrold (1984). Owen Roe O'Neill and the Struggle for Catholic Ireland. Philadelphia: University of Pennsylvania. ISBN 0-8122-7895-X.
- Clarke, Aidan; Edwards, Robert Dudley (1976). "Chapter VII: Pacification, Plantation, and the Catholic Question". In Moody, Theodore William; Martin, F. X.; Byrne, Francis John (eds.). A New History of Ireland. Vol. III. Oxford: Oxford University Press. pp. 187–232. ISBN 978-0-19-820242-4. – 1603–1623
- Farrell, Gerard (2017). The 'Mere Irish' and the Colonisation of Ulster, 1570–1641. Cham, Switzerland: Palgrave MacMillan. ISBN 978-3-319-59362-3. – (Preview)
- Fryde, Edmund Boleslaw; Greenway, D. E.; Porter, S.; Roy, I., eds. (1986). Handbook of British Chronology. Royal Historical Society Guides and Handbooks, No. 2 (3rd ed.). London: Offices of the Royal Historical Society. ISBN 0-86193-106-8. – (for timeline)
- MacMathúna, Séamus; Ó Corrain, Ailbhe (1995). Irish Dictionary. Glasgow: Collins Gem. ISBN 0-00-470753-2.
- McCavitt, John (2002). The Flight of the Earls. Dublin: Gill & MacMillan. ISBN 978-0-7171-3047-4. – (Snippet view)
- Shaw, William A. (1906). The Knights of England. Vol. II. London: Sherratt & Hughes. – Knights bachelors & Index
