= Toby Caulfeild, 3rd Baron Caulfeild =

Anglo-Irish politician

Toby Caulfeild, 3rd Baron Caulfeild of Charlemont (1621–1642) was an Anglo-Irish politician.

== Life ==
He was the eldest son of William Caulfeild, 2nd Baron Caulfeild, and Mary, daughter of Sir John King, knight (ancestor to the Earl of Kingston) and his wife Catherine Drury. Born at Dublin, he was educated at Henley School in England. In 1637 he entered Christ's College, Cambridge in April (aged 16), and Lincoln's Inn in October. He matriculated at Exeter College, Oxford in 1638.

In 1639 Caulfeild was returned to parliament for County Tyrone; in the same year, he succeeded his father as 3rd Baron. During the Irish Rebellion of 1641 he was given his father's old post as governor of Charlemont Fort which was of strategic importance as one of a handful of modern fortresses in Ireland. On 22 October 1641 Felim O'Neill of Kinard went to dine with him and O'Neill's followers seized Charlemont by surprise. After being kept fifteen weeks a prisoner in Charlemont, Caulfeild was moved to O'Neill's castle at Kinard; and on entering the castle was shot dead by Edmund Boy O'Hugh, foster-brother to O'Neill, 6 January 1642. An Inquisition held in Armagh on 24 March 1661 (No. 10) gives his date of death as 6 January 1641 Old Style, which is 6 January 1642 New Style. He was succeeded by his brother Robert, who died on 1 January 1644, according to the same Inquisition.

== Notes ==
Attribution

This article incorporates text from a publication now in the public domain: Stephen, Leslie, ed. (1887). "Caulfeild, Toby (d.1642)". Dictionary of National Biography. Vol. 9. London: Smith, Elder & Co.

Peerage of Ireland
Preceded by William Caulfeild	Baron Caulfeild; 1640–1642	Succeeded by Robert Caulfeild
