= Siege of Dublin (1649) =

Unsuccessful siege of Dublin during Irish Confederate Wars in 1649

Coordinates: 53.35°N 6.266667°W

- Part of Irish Confederate Wars
Date	19 June – 2 August 1649 (1 month and 2 weeks)
Location	Dublin
Result	Siege abandoned

Belligerents
Parliamentarians	(Kingdom of Ireland) Royalists; Confederates

Commanders and leaders
Michael Jones	James Butler

Strength
5,000+	5,800

Ireland and Dublin

The siege of Dublin took place in 1649 during the Irish Confederate Wars. It was a failed attempt by combined Irish Royalist and Confederate forces to capture the capital of Dublin which was held by English Republican forces under Michael Jones. It was part of a strategy by Duke of Ormonde, head of an alliance loyal to Charles II, to seize the remaining foothold of Ireland still under the control of the London Parliament.

The siege was abandoned following a decisive defeat at the Battle of Rathmines, followed soon afterwards by the arrival of Oliver Cromwell and fresh reinforcements.

== Background ==
Michael Jones had controlled Dublin since 1647, which had functioned as the base of operations for his forces and their Irish Protestant allies. The execution of Charles I and the declaration of England as a Republic in early 1649 rapidly changed the situation in Ireland. Groups of former enemies now joined forces, pledging allegiance to the Prince of Wales as Charles II. Amongst the factions who joined this coalition were the Catholic Irish Confederates and the Protestant Scottish Covenanters as well as the remnants of the traditional Royal Irish Army

The Lord Lieutenant Ormonde returned from exile in France to lead the Royalist alliance, and much of Ireland was rapidly brought under his control. Before long the Republicans were pushed back to the strongholds of Derry, Dundalk and Dublin. Only the assistance of the Ulster Army of the Irish Confederates, led by the renegade Owen Roe O'Neill who had refused to agree to terms with Ormonde, prevented Derry from falling when it was besieged.

== Approach ==
On 1 June, Ormonde gathered a substantial force close to Carlow. Once he was joined on 14 June by Lord Inchiquin with troops from Cork he began his march north. Ormonde remained concerned about the threat posed by Owen O'Neill's Ulster Army. He ordered Lord Castlehaven to seize several Leinster towns garrisoned by the Ulster forces, forcing O'Neill to retreat some distance from Dublin.

Ormonde established his staging post for the siege at Finglas, having come via Naas. He accepted a proposal from Inchiquin that he lead a detachment north to take out some of the remaining Republican garrisons to prevent them from offering any assistance to Jones in Dublin. Inchiquin, who had a reputation for boldness, moved northwards and captured Drogheda on 11 July. His next target was the port of Dundalk, which was held by George Monck. Inchiquin routed a relief column of the Ulster Army under Richard O'Farrell coming to the aid of Monck. After barely two days of siege, the garrison mutinied and switched sides, handing the town over to the Royalist cause. Before returning to rejoin Ormonde, Inchiquin took several other towns including Trim, Newry and Carlingford.

== Siege preparations ==
Ormonde moved to try and blockade Dublin Harbour, to prevent any further supplies or reinforcements from reaching Jones and his garrison. Proceeding cautiously, he did not attempt an immediate all-out assault in Dublin. He was increasingly short of money with which to pay his troops. Inchiquin had pressed for a direct attack, but Ormonde hoped that members of the garrison might defect to him.

Ormonde was concerned about reports of a major expedition under Oliver Cromwell that was being readied to sail for Ireland. Worried that their first target would be to land at Cork, Ormonde dispatched Inchiquin with reinforcements to strengthen the southern coast. In his absence, Ormonde relied on his deputies Castlehaven, Thomas Preston and Lord Taaffe for advice.

The blockade of Dublin was constantly disrupted by Jones, who launched raids against the besiegers' lines. Meanwhile a planned Royalist naval blockade under Prince Rupert never materialized because his fleet was itself blockaded in Kinsale by the Republican navy.

On 25 July Ormonde shifted his forces, the bulk of which marched to Rathmines to the south of the city while Lord Dillon with 2,500 men remained poised to the north of Dublin. On 28 July Ormonde's troops stormed Rathfarnham Castle, located on the southern approach to the city. Ormonde also seized the remains of Baggotrath Castle which had recently been partially destroyed by the city's defenders. He planned to use the site for a large artillery battery.

== Battle ==
On the morning of 2 August Jones sallied out of Dublin with a combined force of infantry and cavalry. Having initially defeated the Royalist advance guard at Baggotrath he then marched on the main Royalist camp at Rathgar. A surprised Ormonde tried to rally his troops, but the battle quickly turned into a rout. Ormonde's artillery train and supplies were captured.

== Aftermath ==
After his disastrous defeat at Rathmines, Ormonde abandoned the siege entirely and hastily withdrew to Kilkenny. On 15 August, Oliver Cromwell landed close to Dublin with a large force of New Model Army troops, launching a major campaign to subdue the royalist resistance in Ireland. Jones was acclaimed in London for his victory, but died the same year from fever.

Dublin remained a garrison town in Republican hands until 1660 when it returned to royal control following the Irish Restoration. The events of 1649 were often revived in the following years as various figures sought to prove that they had been loyal to Charles during the siege operations when seeking to have lands restored by the Court of Claims.
