= Turlough O'Neill =

Turlough O'Neill may refer to:

- Turlough Lynagh O'Neill (1532–1595), Irish Gaelic lord of Tír Eoghain in early modern Ireland
- Turlough McHenry O'Neill (died 1608), Irish landowner killed during O'Doherty's rebellion
