= Ulster Protestants =

Ethnoreligious group of the historic Irish province of Ulster

Total population
- Total ambiguous (900,000–1,000,000)

Regions with significant populations
- Northern Ireland: 827,500 (Self-identified) (Northern Irish Protestants)
- Republic of Ireland: 201,400 (Self-identified) (Irish Anglicans) (Irish Presbyterians) (Irish Methodists) (Other Irish Protestants)

Languages
- Ulster English, Ulster Scots, Ulster Irish

Religion
- Protestantism (mostly Presbyterianism, Anglicanism, Pentecostalism, and Methodism)

Related ethnic groups
- Ulster Scots, Anglo-Irish people, Irish people, Scottish people, English people, Scotch-Irish Americans, Scotch-Irish Canadians

Ulster Protestants (Irish: Pobal Phrotestúnach Uladh) are an ethnoreligious group in the Irish province of Ulster, where they make up about 43.5% of the population. Most Ulster Protestants are descendants of settlers who arrived from Great Britain in the early 17th century Ulster Plantation. This was the settlement of the Gaelic, Catholic province of Ulster by Scots and English speaking Protestants, mostly from the historically conflict‑ridden counties of the Scottish Lowlands and Northern England along the Anglo-Scottish border. Many more Scottish Protestant migrants arrived in Ulster in the late 17th century. Those who came from Scotland were mostly Presbyterians, while those from England were either Anglicans (see Church of Ireland) or dissenting branches. There was also a small Methodist community and the Methodist Church in Ireland dates to John Wesley's visit to Ulster in 1752. Although most Ulster Protestants descend from Lowland Scottish people (some of whose descendants consider themselves Ulster Scots), many descend from English, and to a lesser extent, from Irish, Welsh and Huguenots.

Since the 17th century, sectarian and political divisions between Ulster Protestants and Irish Catholics have played a major role in the history of Ulster, and of Ireland as a whole. It has led to bouts of violence and political upheaval, notably in the Irish Confederate Wars, the Cromwellian conquest of Ireland, the Williamite War, the Armagh disturbances, Irish Rebellion of 1798, the Irish revolutionary period, and the Troubles. Today, the vast majority of Ulster Protestants live in Northern Ireland, which was created in 1921 to have an Ulster Protestant majority, and in the east of County Donegal. Politically, most are unionists, who have an Ulster British identity and want Northern Ireland to remain part of the United Kingdom.

== History ==
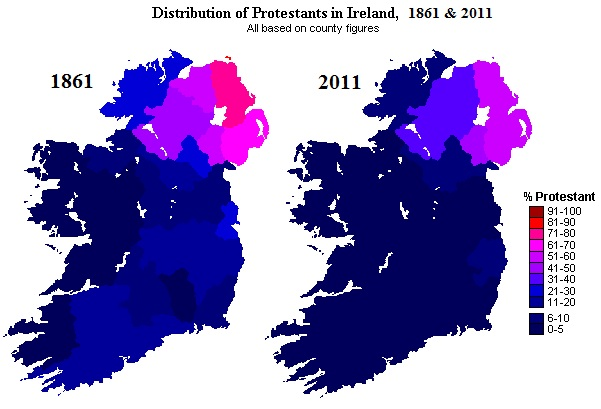
Changes in distribution of Irish Protestants, 1861–2011

The Ulster Protestant community emerged during the Plantation of Ulster. This was the colonisation of Ulster with loyal English-speaking Protestants from Great Britain under the reign of King James. Those involved in planning the plantation saw it as a means of controlling, anglicising, and "civilising" Ulster. The province was almost wholly Gaelic, Catholic and rural, and had been the region most resistant to English control. The plantation was also meant to sever the ties of the Gaelic clans of Ulster with those from the Highlands of Scotland, as it meant a strategic threat to England.

Most of the land colonised was confiscated from the native Irish. Begun privately in 1606, the plantation became government-sponsored in 1609, with much land for settlement being allocated to the livery companies of the City of London. By 1622 there was a total settler population of about 19,000, and by the 1630s it is estimated there were up to 50,000.

The native Irish reaction to the plantation was generally hostile, as Irish Catholics lost their land and became marginalized. In 1641 there was an uprising by Irish Catholics in Ulster who wanted an end to anti-Catholic discrimination, greater Irish self-governance, and to undo the plantations. Some rebels attacked, expelled or massacred Protestant settlers during the rebellion, most notably the Portadown massacre. Some settlers massacred Catholics in kind. It is estimated that up to 12,000 Ulster Protestants were killed or died of illness after being driven from their homes. The rebellion had a lasting psychological impact on the Ulster Protestant community and they commemorated its anniversary for two centuries. In the war that followed, a Scottish Covenanter army invaded and re-captured eastern Ulster from the rebels, while a Protestant settler army held northwestern Ulster. These Protestant armies retreated from central Ulster after the Irish Confederate victory at Benburb. Following the Cromwellian conquest of Ireland (1649–52), Catholicism was repressed and most Catholic-owned land was confiscated.

Another influx of an estimated 20,000 Scottish Protestants, mainly to the coastal counties of Antrim, Down and Londonderry, was a result of the seven ill years of famines in Scotland in the 1690s. This migration decisively changed the population of Ulster, giving it a Protestant majority. While Presbyterians of Scottish descent and origin had already become the majority of Ulster Protestants by the 1660s, when Protestants still made up only a third of the population, they had become an absolute majority in the province by the 1720s.

There were tensions between the two main groups of Ulster Protestants; Scottish Protestant migrants to Ulster were mostly Presbyterian and English Protestants mostly Anglican. The Penal Laws discriminated against both Catholics and Presbyterians, in an attempt to force them to accept the state religion, the Anglican Church of Ireland. Repression of Presbyterians by Anglicans intensified after the Glorious Revolution, especially after the Popery Act 1703 (2 Anne c. 6 (I), and was one reason for heavy onward emigration to British America by Ulster Presbyterians during the 18th century; emigration was particularly heavy to the Thirteen Colonies, where they became known as the Scotch-Irish or Scots-Irish. Between 1717 and 1775, an estimated 200,000 migrated to what became the United States. Some Presbyterians also returned to Scotland during this period, where the Presbyterian Church of Scotland was the state religion. These Penal Laws are partly what led Ulster Presbyterians to become founders and members of the United Irishmen, a republican movement which launched the Irish Rebellion of 1798. Repression of Presbyterians largely ended after the rebellion, with the relaxation of the Penal Laws.

The Kingdom of Ireland became part of the United Kingdom in 1801. As Belfast became industrialised in the 19th century, it attracted yet more Protestant immigrants from Scotland. After the partition of Ireland in 1920, the new government of Northern Ireland launched a campaign to entice Irish unionists/Protestants from the Irish Free State to relocate to Northern Ireland, with inducements of state jobs and housing, and large numbers accepted.

== Present day ==
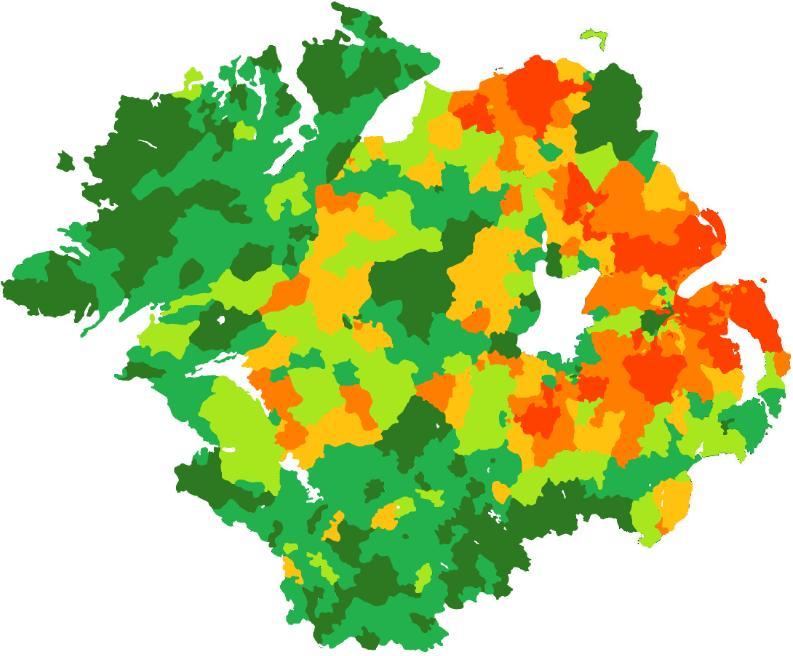
Percentage of Protestants in each electoral division in Ulster, based on census figures from 2001 (UK) and 2006 (ROI). 0-10% dark green, 10-30% mid-green, 30-50% light green, 50-70% light orange, 70-90% mid-orange, 90-100% dark orange.

The vast majority of Ulster Protestants live in Northern Ireland, which is part of the United Kingdom. Most tend to support the Union with Great Britain, and are referred to as unionists. Unionism is an ideology that (in Ulster) has been divided by some into two camps; Ulster British, who are attached to the United Kingdom and identify primarily as British; and Ulster loyalists, whose politics are primarily ethnic, prioritising their Ulster Protestantism above their British identity. The Loyal Orders, which include the Orange Order, Royal Black Institution and Apprentice Boys of Derry, are exclusively Protestant fraternal organisations which originated in Ulster and still have most of their membership there.

At the time of the partition of Ireland, about 70,000 Ulster Protestants lived in the three counties of Ulster that are now in the Republic of Ireland, Cavan, Monaghan and Donegal, although their numbers have significantly declined in the intervening century. They now make up around a fifth of the Republic's Protestant population. Unlike Protestants in the rest of the Republic, some retain a strong sense of Britishness, and a small number have difficulty identifying with the independent Irish state. Ulster Protestants also share common religious, political and social ties with some Protestants in counties that border Ulster, particularly County Leitrim that hosts a number of Orange Halls. Sir Jim Kilfedder, Ulster Unionist MP, and Gordon Wilson were both Leitrim Protestants.

Ulster Protestants are also found in diaspora communities, particularly in Scotland, England, and in some other areas of Ireland such as Dublin.

Most Ulster Protestants speak Ulster English, and some on the north-east coast and in East Donegal speak with the Ulster Scots dialects. A very small number have also learned the Irish language as a second language.

== See also ==
- Irish Catholics
- Protestantism in Ireland
- Two nations theory (Ireland)
