= Gordon O'Neill =

Irish soldier (died 1705)

- Born: c. 1650 or c. 1652
- Died: 1705; France
- Parents: Felim O’Neill (father); Jean Gordon (mother)
- Military career
- Allegiance: Jacobite army; French army
- Rank: Colonel in Ireland,
- Conflicts: Williamite War in Ireland

Colonel Gordon O'Neill, was an officer in King James II's Irish army who fought at the Siege of Derry, the Battle of the Boyne, and the Battle of Aughrim for the Jacobites.

== Birth and origins ==
Gordon was born, about 1650 or about 1652 as the only child of Felim O'Neill of Kinard and his third wife Jean Gordon. His father was a prominent member of the O'Neill dynasty and one of the leaders of the Confederates. His mother was Scottish, a daughter of George Gordon, 1st Marquess of Huntly, and the widow of Claud Hamilton, 2nd Baron Hamilton of Strabane. His parents were both Catholic. They had married in November 1649.

Family tree

Gordon O'Neill with parents, and other selected relatives. (Note: This family tree is based on a tree showing Phelim and Hugh O'Neill.)

Turlough; O'Neill d. 1608	Catherine
Claud; 2nd Baron d. 1638	Jean; Gordon	Phelim; O'Neill; 1604–1653
James; 3rd Baron; 1633–1655	Gordon; O'Neill

Legend

XXX	Subject of the article	XXX	O'Neills of Kinard	XXX	Barons; Strabane

== Early life ==
He was a young child during the Irish Confederate Wars (1641–1653). His father was executed in 1653 after the defeat.

== Williamite War ==
Gordon O'Neill raised a regiment for King James II in 1689 and became a colonel in the Irish army. He was the Member of Parliament for County Tyrone in the brief Patriot Parliament called by James II in 1689. During the Williamite war in Ireland, he saw action at the Siege of Derry, at the Battle of the Boyne, and the Battle of Aughrim, where he was left for dead but was picked up by some Scottish Williamite officers who recognised him.

== French exile ==
He recovered from his wounds, and took his regiment to France after the Treaty of Limerick in 1692. There, it was known as the Régiment de Charlemont. He died in 1705 in France.

== Poem ==
The 17th-century Irish poet Dermot McMurray is believed to be the author of a Gaelic poem about him. The poem has a Latin endorsement that reads: Versus hibernici Gordono Ó Neill pro lingua hibernica (Irish verses to Gordon O Neill for the Irish language). The first four verses, translated into English, read:

1. Go, ye handful of verses — stay not long with me — to Néill of the fine cheeks, to him everything good is due.
2. Say to his soft hair, from me, that ye are a nut from the tree which I plucked — its side was towards the ground — from the branch with fresh beautiful appearance.
3. Tell him, to excite mirth, Conn's and Cormac's heir, that in my store with ye there is a cofferful.
4. Sir Felim's son, Navan's prince, though he speaks not Irish, shall bestow on ye a clear-bright laugh, no shame for him it is to look upon ye.

== Notes and references ==
=== Sources ===
- D'Alton, John (1855). Illustrations, historical and genealogical, of King James's Irish army list, 1689. Dublin: Published by the author. OCLC 838655763.
- Boyle, John (1879) [1st pub. 1867]. The Battle-fields of Ireland, from 1688 to 1691 (Fourth ed.). New York: Robert Coddington. OCLC 1041060867.
- Casway, Jerrold I. (2004). "O'Neill, Sir Phelim Roe [Felim Ruadh] (1603–1653)". In Matthew, Colin; Harrison, Brian (eds.). Oxford Dictionary of National Biography. Vol. 41. New York: Oxford University Press. pp. 856–860. ISBN 0-19-861391-1.
- Dunlop, Robert (1895). "O'Neill, Phelim 1604?–1653". In Lee, Sidney (ed.). Dictionary of National Biography. Vol. XLII. New York: MacMillan and Co. pp. 204–208. OCLC 8544105.
- Farrell, Gerard (2017). The 'Mere Irish' and the Colonisation of Ulster, 1570–1641. Cham, Switzerland: Palgrave MacMillan. ISBN 978-3-319-59362-3. – (Preview)
- Graham, Rev. John (1841). Ireland Preserved; or the Siege of Londonderry and the Battle of Aughrim with Lyrical Poetry and Biographical Notes (2nd ed.). Dublin: Hardy and Walker. OCLC 00992682. – Short biographies in the biographical notes
- Walsh, Rev. Paul (1933). Gleanings from Irish Manuscripts (2nd ed.). Dublin: At the Sign of the Three Candles. OCLC 1045619135.
- Webb, Alfred (1878). "O'Neill, Sir Felim". Compendium of Irish Biography. Dublin: M. H. Gill & Son. pp. 416–418. OCLC 122693688.
