= Charlemont Bridge =

Stone bridge in County Tyrone, Northern Ireland

Coordinates: 54.44434°N 6.68681°W

Charlemont Bridge is a stone bridge in Moy, County Tyrone, Northern Ireland.

The bridge spans the River Blackwater connecting the villages of Moy and Charlemont (on the east bank) on the old coaching route between Dungannon and Armagh. It is a triple-arched stone bridge constructed in 1855 by William Dargan, who was also responsible for the Portadown to Dungannon section of the Ulster Railway.
