= Battle of Scarrifholis =

Battle on 21 June 1650 near Letterkenny during the Cromwellian conquest of Ireland

Coordinates: 54.932431°N 7.799514°W

- Part of the Cromwellian Conquest of Ireland
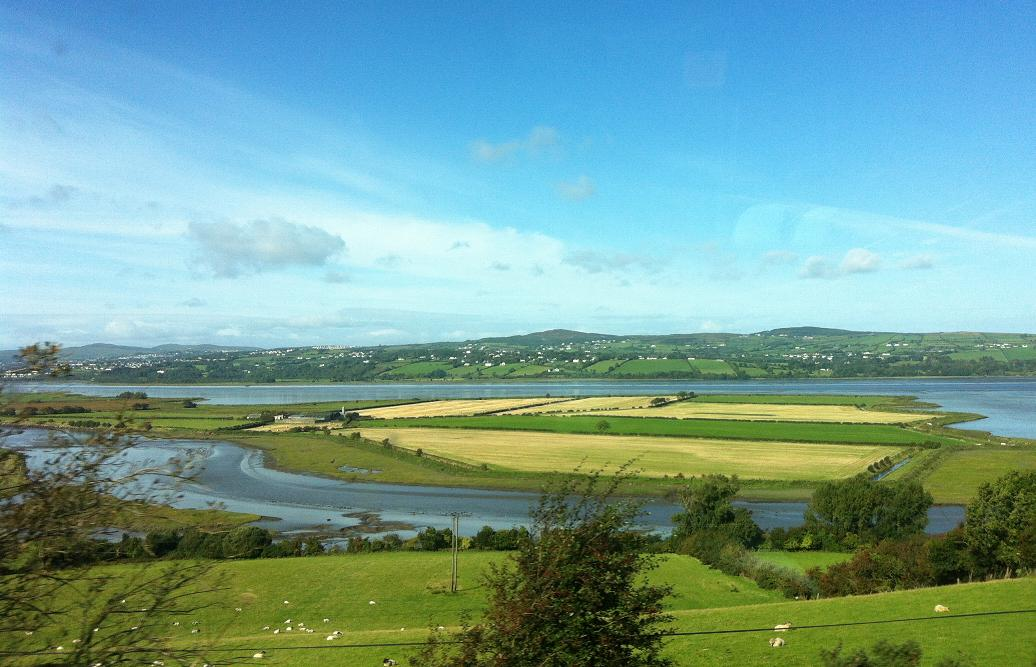
- River Swilly, at Letterkenny
Date	21 June 1650
Location	near Letterkenny, County Donegal
Result	Commonwealth victory

Belligerents
Confederates	Commonwealth of England

Commanders and leaders
Heber MacMahon; Richard O'Farrell	Charles Coote; Roger Fenwick †

Strength
3,000 infantry, 400 cavalry	1,600 infantry, 1,200 cavalry

Casualties and losses
Between 2,000 – 3,000 killed, wounded or captured	c. 100 killed or wounded

The Battle of Scarrifholis, also spelt Scariffhollis was fought on 21 June 1650, near Letterkenny in County Donegal during the Cromwellian conquest of Ireland. A force loyal to the Commonwealth of England under Charles Coote defeated the Catholic Ulster Army, commanded by Heber MacMahon, Roman Catholic Bishop of Clogher.

Although outnumbered, most of Coote's troops were New Model Army veterans, and had three times the number of cavalry. After an hour of fighting, the Ulster army collapsed and fled, losing most of its men, officers, weapons, and supplies. The battle secured the north of Ireland for the Commonwealth and cleared the way to complete the Cromwellian conquest of Ireland.

== Background ==
The Irish Confederate Wars, sparked by the 1641 Rebellion, were initially fought between the predominantly Catholic Confederate Ireland, and a largely Protestant Irish Royal Army, led by Ormond. Both claimed to be loyal to Charles I, while there was a three sided war in Ulster. The latter involved Royalists, Gaelic Catholic leader Eoghan Ó Néill, and Presbyterian militia, known as the Laggan Army, supported by Scots Covenanters under Robert Munro.

In September 1643, Ormond agreed a truce, or 'Cessation', with the Confederation, freeing his troops for use in England against Parliament in the First English Civil War. Some Irish Protestants objected, and switched sides, including Sir Charles Coote, who became Parliamentarian commander in Connacht. Charles surrendered in 1646, while a Covenanter/Royalist uprising was quickly suppressed in the 1648 Second English Civil War. On 17 January 1649, the Confederation allied with Ormond's Royalists; following the execution of Charles on 30 January, they were joined by the Laggan Army, and remaining Scots troops in Ulster.

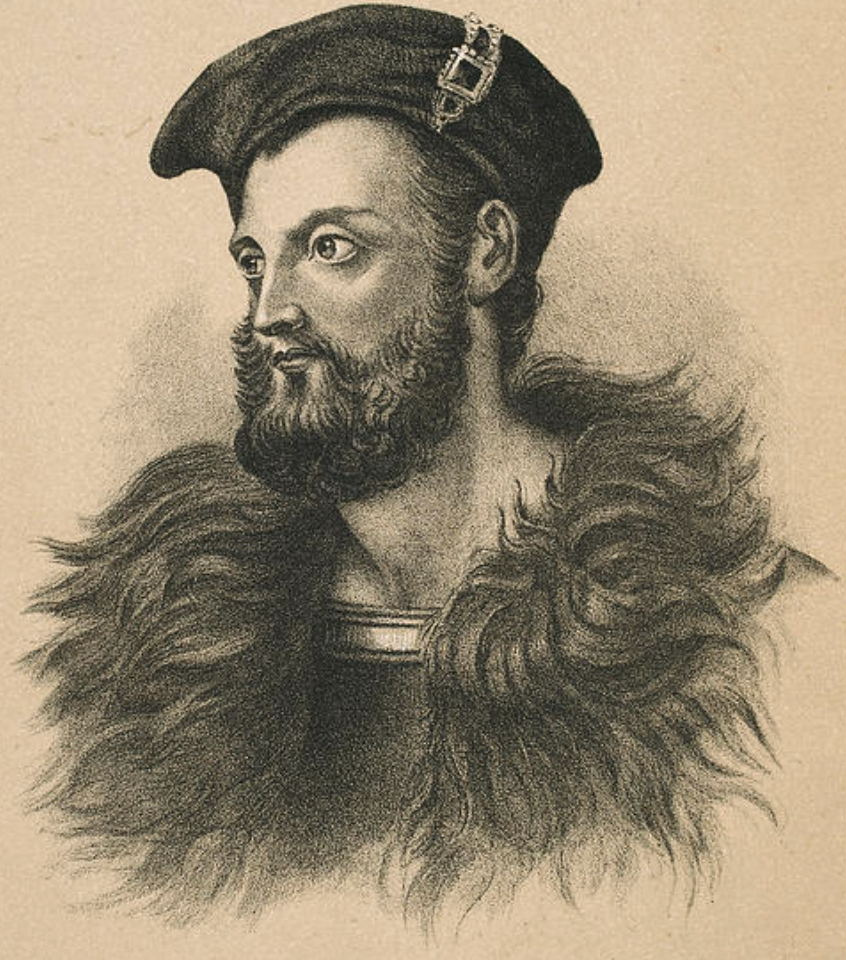
Eoghan Ó Néill; his refusal to support the Alliance in Ulster undermined its ability to resist Commonwealth forces

There were various reasons for this. The Covenanter government, who provided support for Scottish settlers in Ulster, considered Cromwell and other leaders of the new Commonwealth of England dangerous political and religious radicals. As Scots, they objected to the execution of their king by the English; as Presbyterians, they viewed monarchy as divinely ordained, making regicide also sacrilegious, and they transferred their allegiance to his son, Charles II of England.

However, this was offset by a split within the Confederation, between Catholic landowners who wanted to preserve the position prevailing in 1641, and those like Ó Néill, whose estates had been confiscated in 1607. As a result, he agreed a truce with Coote, and refused to join the Alliance, depriving them of their most effective fighting force in the north. Despite this, by late July, Ormond's combined Royalist/Confederate army controlled most of Ireland.

Ormond's defeat at Rathmines on 2 August allowed Cromwell and an army of 12,000 to land in Dublin unopposed. After capturing Drogheda on 11 September, his main force headed south towards Wexford; Colonel Robert Venables was sent north with three regiments, or around 2,500 men, to take control of Ulster. Munro's garrisons surrendered with minimal resistance, and by the end of September, Venables had occupied Dundalk, Carlingford, Newry, and Belfast. These were accompanied by the mass expulsion of Scots settlers, as punishment for their defection; when Coote captured Coleraine on 15 September, he massacred the largely Scottish garrison.

Ó Néill's death in November 1649 and Coote's defeat of a combined Royalist/Covenanter force at Lisnagarvey in December left the Catholic Ulster army as the only remaining opposition to the Commonwealth in the north. At a meeting at Belturbet on 18 March 1650, Heber MacMahon, Catholic Bishop of Clogher, was appointed in his place. Although a leading figure in the Confederation, MacMahon had no military experience and opposed the alliance with Ormond's Royalists; his election was essentially a compromise between supporters of Henry, Ó Néill's son, and his cousin, Phelim Ó Néill.

== Campaign ==
1650 Scariffhollis campaign; key locations

By 20 May, MacMahon and his deputy Richard O'Farrell had assembled an army near Loughgall, with 5,000 infantry and 1,000 cavalry. They lacked both arms and artillery but after Ormond promised to send these from Connacht, they marched north, intending to divide Coote's troops at Derry from those commanded by Venables at Carrickfergus in the east. To do this, MacMahon established a line of garrisons with its northern end at Ballycastle, then moved south, intending to cross the River Foyle just below Lifford and maintain contact with Ormond through Ballyshannon.

At this point, Coote had only 1,400 men and seemed vulnerable; the Irish crossed the river on 2 June, beating off an attack by the Commonwealth cavalry and occupied Lifford, where they spent the next two weeks and Coote withdrew to Derry. However, the supplies promised by Ormond failed to arrive, leaving MacMahon short of provisions, while on 18 June Coote was joined by an additional 1,000 infantry under Colonel Roger Fenwick sent from Belfast. At the same time, detaching men for the new garrisons left MacMahon with around 4,000 infantry and 400 cavalry.

MacMahon now relocated to the Doonglebe/Tullygay Hill overlooking the pass at Scariffhollis, a strong defensive position two miles (3 km) west of Letterkenny on the River Swilly. When Myles MacSweeney took his regiment off to recapture his ancestral home at Doe Castle, it left the two armies roughly equal in number. However, Coote's men were well equipped veterans and he had three times the number of cavalry; when he appeared at Scariffhollis on 21 June, MacMahon's subordinates advised him not to risk battle. They argued Coote would soon be forced to retreat due to lack of provisions, allowing the Irish to withdraw into Connaught in good order.

== Battle ==
For reasons that are still debated, MacMahon ignored this advice and on the morning of 21 June 1650 ordered his troops down from their mountain camp to give battle. Coote later reported that although the ground was still "excessive bad", it allowed him to use his cavalry, although the initial fighting was conducted by the opposing infantry.

The Irish army was drawn up in a large mass formation with 200–300 musketeers in front, which may have been due to their shortage of ammunition. The battle began when Colonel Fenwick led a detachment of 150 men against the advance guard; after an exchange of fire, during which Fenwick was mortally wounded, it turned into a hand-to-hand struggle. As Coote fed in reinforcements, the Irish musketeers fell back on their main force, which had no room to manoeuvre and was now subjected to devastating volleys at close range. After an hour of bitter conflict, the Irish were out of ammunition and at this point the Parliamentarian cavalry charged their flank. Thrown into disarray, the Irish broke and ran.

In most battles, flight was the point at which the defeated suffered the heaviest casualties, exacerbated by the lack of Irish cavalry and the brutal nature of the war. Most of the infantry died on the battlefield or in the pursuit that followed, including Henry Ó Néill and many officers, some of whom were killed after surrendering. Estimates of the Irish dead range from 2,000 – 3,000, while Coote lost around 100 killed or wounded.

== Aftermath ==
MacMahon escaped with 200 horse but was captured a week later and executed. Phelim Ó Néill and O'Farrell made it to Charlemont, which was besieged by Coote and surrendered on 14 August. With the exception of a few scattered garrisons, this ended fighting in the north; Limerick was taken by Hardress Waller in October 1651 and the war ended when Galway surrendered to Coote in May 1652.

== Sources ==
- Bagwell, Richard (1909). Ireland under the Stuarts and under the Interregnum. Vol. II. London: Longmans, Green, and Co. OCLC 458582656. – 1642 to 1660
- Plant, David (27 March 2008). "The Battle of Scariffhollis, 1650". BCW Project. Archived from the original on 17 March 2014.
- Bennett, Martyn (1999). The Civil Wars Experienced: Britain and Ireland, 1638–1661. Routledge. ISBN 978-0415159029.
- Casway, Jerrold (1984). Owen Roe O'Neill and the Struggle for Catholic Ireland. Philadelphia: University of Pennsylvania. ISBN 0-8122-7895-X.
- Connolly, Sean Joseph (2008). The Divided Kingdom: Ireland 1630–1800. Oxford: Oxford University Press. ISBN 978-0-19-954347-2. – (Preview)
- Duffy, Eamonn (1984). "The Siege and Surrender of Galway 1651-1652". Journal of the Galway Archaeological and Historical Society. 39: 115–142. JSTOR 25535533.
- Gentles, Ian (2016). The English Revolution and the Wars in the Three Kingdoms, 1638-1652. Routledge. ISBN 978-1138148475.
- Hamilton, Lord Ernest (1920). The Irish Rebellion of 1641 with a History of the Events that Led up to and Succeeded it. London: John Murray.
- Moore, Séamus P (1952). "Ever Mac Mahon: Soldier Bishop of the Confederation of Kilkenny". Studies: An Irish Quarterly Review. 41 (161): 91–98. JSTOR 30099900.
- Morrill, John (2004). "Venables, Robert". Oxford Dictionary of National Biography (online ed.). Oxford University Press. doi:10.1093/ref:odnb/28181. (Subscription, Wikipedia Library access or UK public library membership required.)
- Murphy, Rev. Denis S.J. (1893). Cromwell in Ireland: a history of Cromwell's Irish Campaign. Boston, Massachusetts: The Pilot Publishing Co.
- Royle, Trevor (2004). Civil War: The Wars of the Three Kingdoms 1638–1660. Palgrave Macmillan. ISBN 0-312-29293-7.
- Scott, David (2003). Politics and War in the Three Stuart Kingdoms, 1637-49. Palgrave. ISBN 978-0-333-65874-1. – (No preview)
- Silke, John J. (2011). "Scariffhollis 1650". Clogher Record. 20 (3): 491–499. JSTOR 41412261.
- Wedgwood, Cicely Veronica (1978) [1st pub. 1958]. The King's War 1641–1647. London: Collins. ISBN 0-00-211404-6.
