= Moy, County Tyrone =

Village and area in Northern Ireland

Coordinates: 54.447°N 6.692°W

Moy: Irish: An Mhaigh; Scots: Tha Moy; The Moy
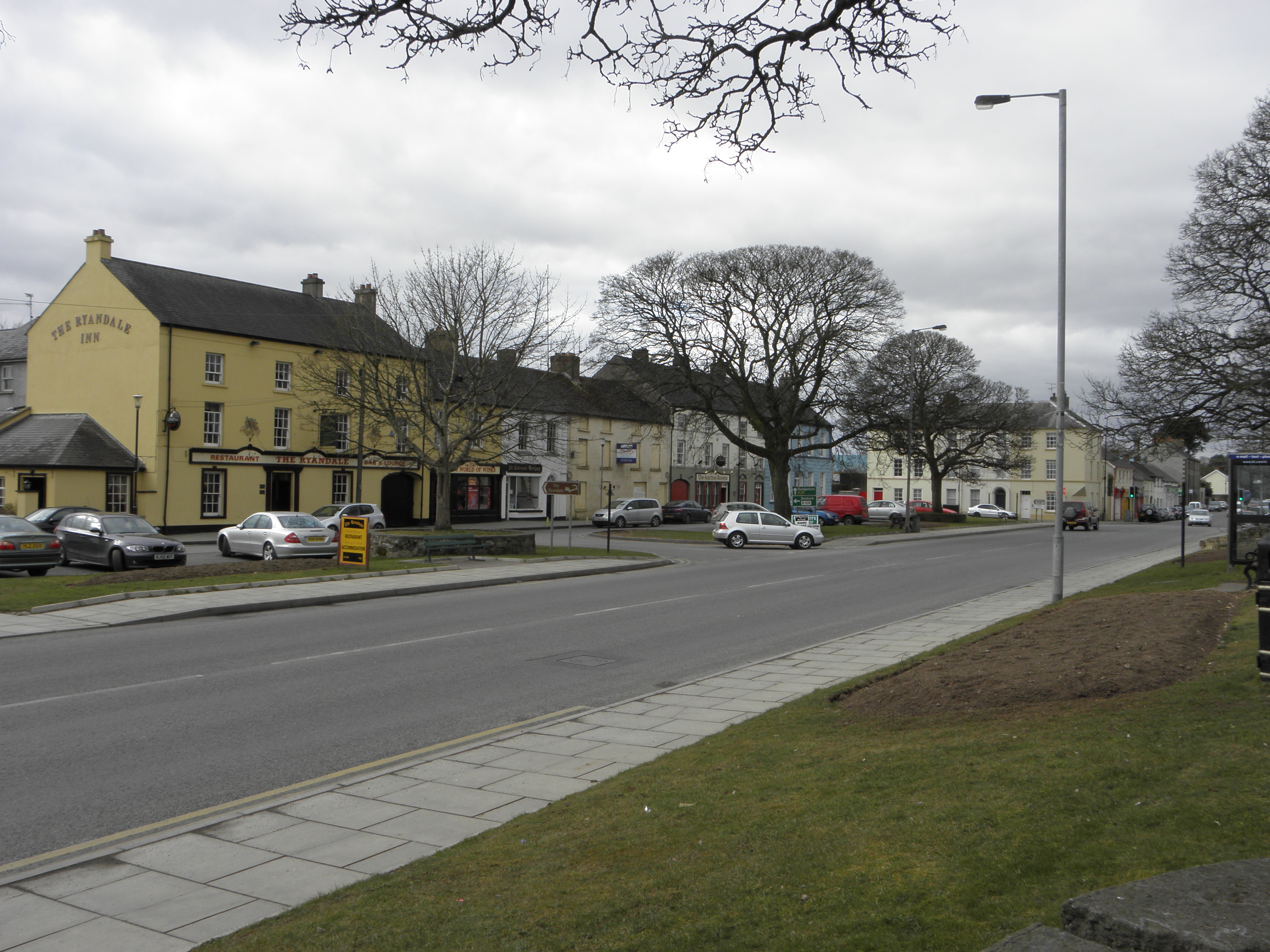

- Location within Northern Ireland
- Population: 1,941 (2021 census)
- Irish grid reference: H7962
- District: Mid Ulster
- County: County Tyrone
- Country: Northern Ireland
- Sovereign state: United Kingdom
- Post town: DUNGANNON
- Postcode district: BT71
- Dialling code: 028
- UK Parliament: Fermanagh and South Tyrone
- NI Assembly: Fermanagh and South Tyrone
- Website: moyni.weebly.com

Moy (from Irish an Maigh, meaning 'the plain') is a village and townland in County Tyrone, Northern Ireland about 5 miles (8 kilometres) southeast of Dungannon and beside the smaller village of Charlemont. Charlemont is on the east bank of the River Blackwater and Moy on the west; the two are joined by Charlemont Bridge. The river is also the boundary between County Tyrone and County Armagh. The 2021 census recorded a population of 1,941.

== History ==
The houses lining the village square are mostly mid-18th century, though all four churches (Roman Catholic, Church of Ireland, Presbyterian and Methodist) are later.

Moy had town commissioners under the Lighting of Towns (Ireland) Act, 1828 from 1844 until about 1865.

=== The Troubles ===
Incidents in Moy during the Troubles resulting in two or more fatalities:

1973

- 5 August 1973 - Francis Mullen (59) and Bernadette Mullen (39), Catholic civilians, were found shot dead by the Ulster Volunteer Force at their farmhouse, near Moy.

1975

- 2 August 1975 - George McCall, civilian, Protestant, aged 22, former member of the UDR, shot dead by three masked IRA men, near his home at Jockey Lane.
- 23 October 1975 - Peter McKearney (63) and Jane McKearney (58), both Catholic civilian], were shot dead by the Ulster Volunteer Force at their home, Listamlet, near Moy. A contemporary newspaper article reported that "[British] Army issue ammunition" had been used. The attack has been linked to the "Glenanne gang".

1976

- 17 May 1976 - Robert Dobson (35) and Thomas Dobson (38), both Protestant civilians, were shot and killed by a non-specific republican group at their workplace, an egg packing factory in Dungannon Street, Moy.

1991

- December 1991 - Robin Farmer (19) Protestant civilian was murdered in his father's shop by republicans. He had returned home from university for Christmas.

1992

- 3 January 1992 - John McKearney (69) and Kevin McKearney (32), both Catholic civilians, were shot dead by the Ulster Volunteer Force at their butcher's shop, Moy. John McKearney died on 4 April 1992. They had been targeted because two of Kevin McKearney's brothers had been killed on IRA service and another was a former IRA hunger striker, serving time for his part in the murder of a UDR soldier.
- 6 September 1992 - Charles Fox (63) and Teresa Fox (53), both Catholic civilians, were shot dead by the Ulster Volunteer Force at their home, Listamlet Road, near Moy. Their son, IRA volunteer Paddy Fox, was serving a 10-year prison sentence for possession of a bomb at the time.

== Former railway ==
The Portadown – Dungannon section of the Portadown, Dungannon and Omagh Junction Railway (PD&O) opened in 1858. Its nearest station to Moy was optimistically called Trew and Moy, although it was at Trew Mount over 2 miles (3 kilometres) north of Moy. In 1876 the PD&O became part of the new Great Northern Railway. The Ulster Transport Authority took over the line in 1958 and closed it in 1965.

== Places of interest ==
Dublin iron-founder Richard Turner designed a conservatory for the house c. 1850.

== Sport ==
Moy has a long history of horse riding and Gaelic games. Moy Tir Na nOg were the 2018 All Ireland Intermediate Club Champions.

== Schools ==
- Moy Regional Primary School
- St. John's Primary School, Moy

== Demography ==
Moy is classified as a Village by the Northern Ireland Statistics and Research Agency (NISRA) (i.e. with population between 1,000 and 2,499 people). On Census Day (27 March 2011) the usually resident population of Moy Settlement was 1,598, accounting for 0.09% of the NI total. Of these:

- 24.72% were aged under 18 years, with 10.76% aged 65 and over
- 49.25% of the population were male, with 51.75% female
- 73.97% were from a Catholic background, with 22.03% from a 'Protestant and Other Christian (including Christian related)' background
- 21.59% said their nationality was British, 39.80% said their nationality was Irish and 29.04% said their nationality was Northern Irish

== Notable people ==
- Ryan Kelly, singer, songwriter, born and grew up in the Moy. Member of the Irish band Celtic Thunder.
- John King, explorer in Australia
- Tommy McKearney, Provisional IRA volunteer
- Gerry McKenna (born 1953) – MRIA, biologist, Senior Vice President of the Royal Irish Academy, Vice Chancellor and President of University of Ulster
- Paul Muldoon, poet, born and grew up in the Moy. He refers to it often in his poems.
