= Hovenden =

Hovenden is a Dutch surname. Following English immigration there in the sixteenth century it also became more common in Ireland. Notable people with this surname include the following:

- Giles Hovenden, an Anglo-Irish figure who established the Hovenden family in Ireland
- Henry Hovenden, Giles' son, Anglo-Irish secretary and advisor to the Earl of Tyrone
- Helen Corson Hovenden (1846–1935), American painter
- Robert Hovenden (died 1614), English academic administrator at the University of Oxford
- Robert Hovenden (Ireland), a seventeenth century Irish landowner who took part in the Irish Rebellion of 1641
- Roger Hovenden (fl.1174–1201), English chronicler
- Thomas Hovenden (1840–1895), Irish-American artist and teacher

Hovenden, like all Dutch surnames, can also be used as a given name:

- Hovenden Hely (1823–1872), Australian explorer and politician
- Sir Hovenden Walker (1656/66–1725/28), British naval officer
