= Robert Hovenden (Ireland) =

Irish rebel

Robert Hovenden or Robert Hovendon was an Irish figure who participated in the Irish Rebellion of 1641. Hovenden was the half-brother of Sir Phelim O'Neill, a prime instigator in the Ulster-centred rebellion. Although Hovenden was of New English descent, he was a Roman Catholic like many of the other Hovenden settlers in Ireland. His father (also known as Robert Hovenden) had in 1613 married the widow of Turlough Og O'Neill of County Tyrone who had been killed while serving on the Crown's side in O'Doherty's Rebellion. The family acquired property in Kinard some of which was Hovendon's, although Sir Phelim as the heir to his father was the dominant figure in the area and sat in Irish Parliament as member for Dungannon.

Hovenden was likely to have advance warning of the Irish Rebellion from his brother. He was later accused of having taunted Protestant captives by calling them "base, degenerate cowards".

== Bibliography ==
- Casway, Jerrold. Owen Roe O'Neill and the Struggle for Catholic Ireland. University of Pennsylvania Press, 1984.
- Darcy, Eamon. The Irish Rebellion of 1641 And the Wars of the Three Kingdoms. Boydell & Brewer, 2013.
- Marshall, John J. The Hovendens: Foster Brothers of Aodh O'Neill, Prince of Ulster (Earl of Tireoghan). Ulster Journal of Archaeology, Vol. XIII, No. 1, Feb. 1907.
