= Felim O'Neill of Kinard =

Irish politician and soldier (1604–1653)

Sir Phelim O'Neill
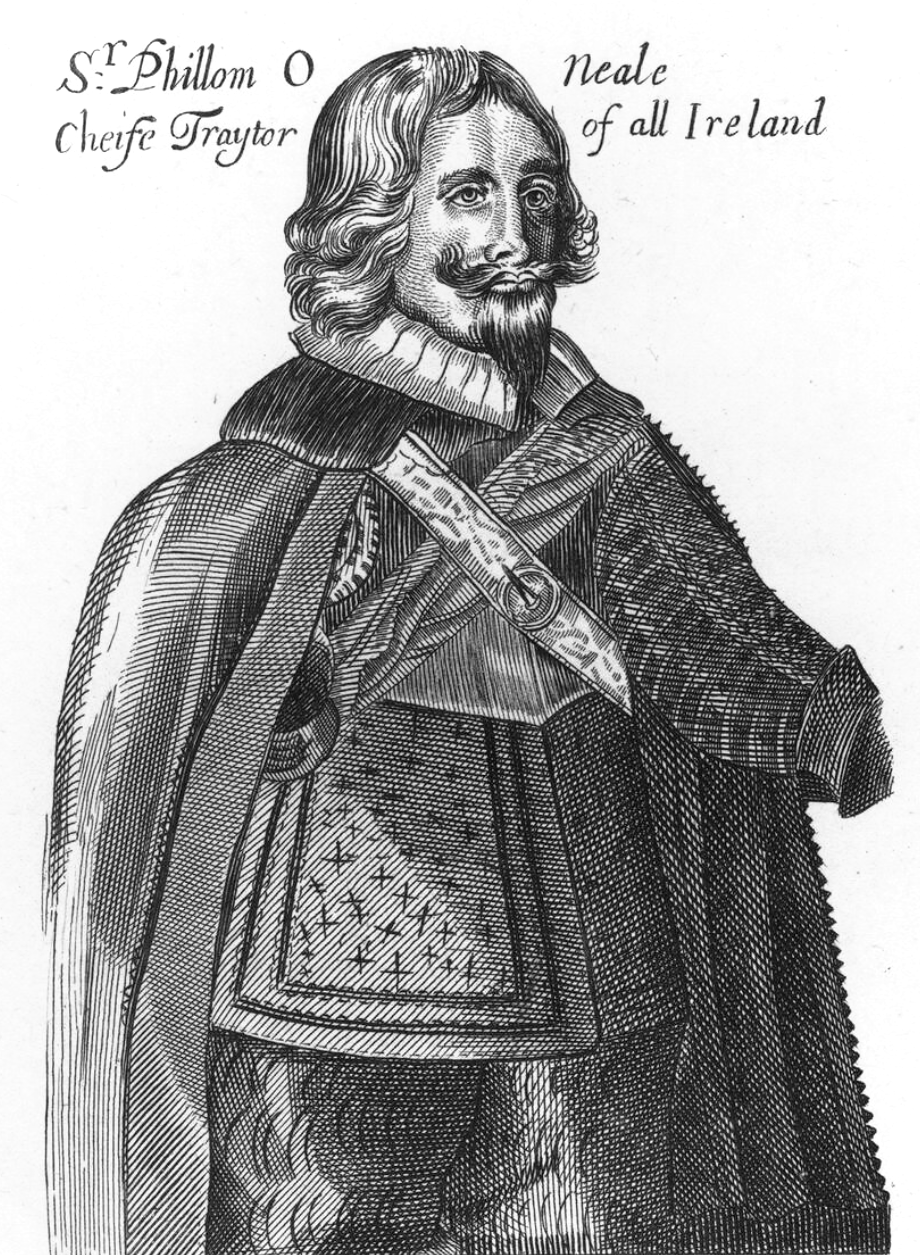
- Detail of the portrait further down
- Born: About December 1604
- Died: 10 March 1653
- Family: O'Neill dynasty
- Spouse: Jean Gordon
- Issue: Gordon O'Neill
- Father: Turlough MacShane O'Neill
- Mother: Catherine O'Neill
- Military career
- Allegiance: Confederate Ireland
- Conflicts: Irish Rebellion of 1641; Siege of Drogheda (1641); Irish Confederate Wars; Battle of Glenmaquin; Battle of Benburb; Cromwellian Conquest of Ireland; Battle of Scarrifholis; Siege of Charlemont

Sir Phelim Roe O'Neill of Kinard (Irish: Sir Féilim Rua Ó Néill na Ceann Ard; 1604–1653) was an Irish politician and soldier who started the Irish rebellion in Ulster on 23 October 1641. He joined the Irish Catholic Confederation in 1642 and fought in the Wars of the Three Kingdoms under his cousin, Owen Roe O'Neill, in the Confederate Ulster Army. After the Cromwellian conquest of Ireland O’Neill went into hiding but was captured, tried and executed in 1653.

Family tree

Phelim O'Neill with his last wife, his parents, and other selected relatives. (Note: This family tree is based on a tree showing Phelim and Hugh O'Neill.)

Henry; O'Neill d. 1579	Hugh; Earl of Tyrone c. 1550 – 1616
Henry Og; O'Neill d. 1608	Cortine	Turlough; MacHenry; O'Neill of Fews
Turlough; O'Neill d. 1608	Catherine	Robert; Hovenden
Claud; 2nd Baron d. 1638	Jean; Gordon	Phelim; O'Neill; 1604–1653	Robert; Hovenden
James; 3rd Baron; 1633–1655	Gordon; O'Neill

Legend

XXX	Subject of the article	XXX	O'Neills of Kinard	XXX	Earl of Tyrone	XXX	Barons; Strabane

== Birth and origins ==
Phelim was born in 1604, the eldest son of Turlough O'Neill and his wife Catherine O'Neill. His father was a member of the Kinard branch of the O'Neills who were descendants of Shane O'Neill of Kinard, a half-brother of Conn Baccach O'Neill. His father and paternal grandfather were killed on 20 June 1608, while defending Kinard against the insurgents during the O'Doherty's Rebellion. This grandfather, Sir Henry Óg O'Neill, had fought for his second cousin and father-in-law, Hugh O'Neill, Earl of Tyrone in the Nine Years' War, but had received a pardon and was confirmed in his lands in Tiranny and Minterburn. His second great-grandfather, Sean, a brother of Conn Bacach, had settled in Tynan parish by at least 1514 in a sub-district called Cluain Dabhal. Phelim's name in Irish shows his paternal genealogy as: "Felim mac Turlogh mac Henry Óg mac Henry mac Seán mac Conn Mór Ó Néill" (father of Conn Bacach O'Neill).

Phelim's mother was Catherine, daughter of Turlough MacHenry O'Neill, chief of the Fews branch of the O'Neills. After Phelim's father's death, she remarried to Robert Hovenden, a Catholic of recent English descent. He had two half-brothers from his mother's second marriage: Robert Hovenden and Alexander Hovenden. The latter was killed as a captain in 1644 fighting for Phelim.

== Early life ==
Felim, together with his younger brother Turlough, entered King's Inns in London in June 1621, as a knowledge of the law was considered important for landowners of the era. He briefly converted to Protestantism, before returning to Catholicism.

He married three times. In 1629 he married a daughter of Arthur Magennis, the 3rd Viscount Magennis of Iveagh. Her first name is unknown.

On 17 March 1639 in Dublin O'Neill was knighted by Thomas Wentworth, Lord Deputy, thanks to the influence of his relation the Earl of Antrim. Shortly before the rebellion, O'Neill evicted some of his Gaelic tenants near Kinard and replaced them with British settler families who paid higher rents.

In summer 1641, O'Neill was elected MP for Dungannon in County Tyrone in a by-election for the Irish Parliament of 1640–1649, replacing Thomas Madden, who had died in office.

His first wife died in September 1641 shortly before the rebellion. He married secondly Louise, daughter of Thomas Preston, 1st Viscount Tara, a younger brother of the 5th Viscount Gormanston.

== Rebellion ==
Like many Irish Catholics and especially Gaelic Irish Catholics, O'Neill felt threatened by the Protestant English government of Ireland. In particular, they were aggrieved at Catholic exclusion from public office and the continual confiscations of Catholic-owned land. Another reason pressing him into desperate action was that Phelim was deep in debt.

=== Plot ===
This fear reached its high point in the late 1630s and early 1640s, when Thomas Wentworth, Lord Deputy for Charles I, was known to be planning widespread new plantations. A crisis point was reached in 1641, when the Scottish Covenanters and English Long Parliament threatened to invade Ireland to finally subdue Catholicism there. In this atmosphere of fear and paranoia, Phelim O'Neill became involved in a plot hatched by fellow Gaelic Irish Catholics from Ulster, to seize Dublin and swiftly take over the other important towns of Ireland. After this, they planned to issue their demands for full rights for Catholics and Irish self-government in the King's name. O'Neill's role was to take towns and fortified places in the north of the country whereas Maguire was tasked with seizing Dublin Castle.

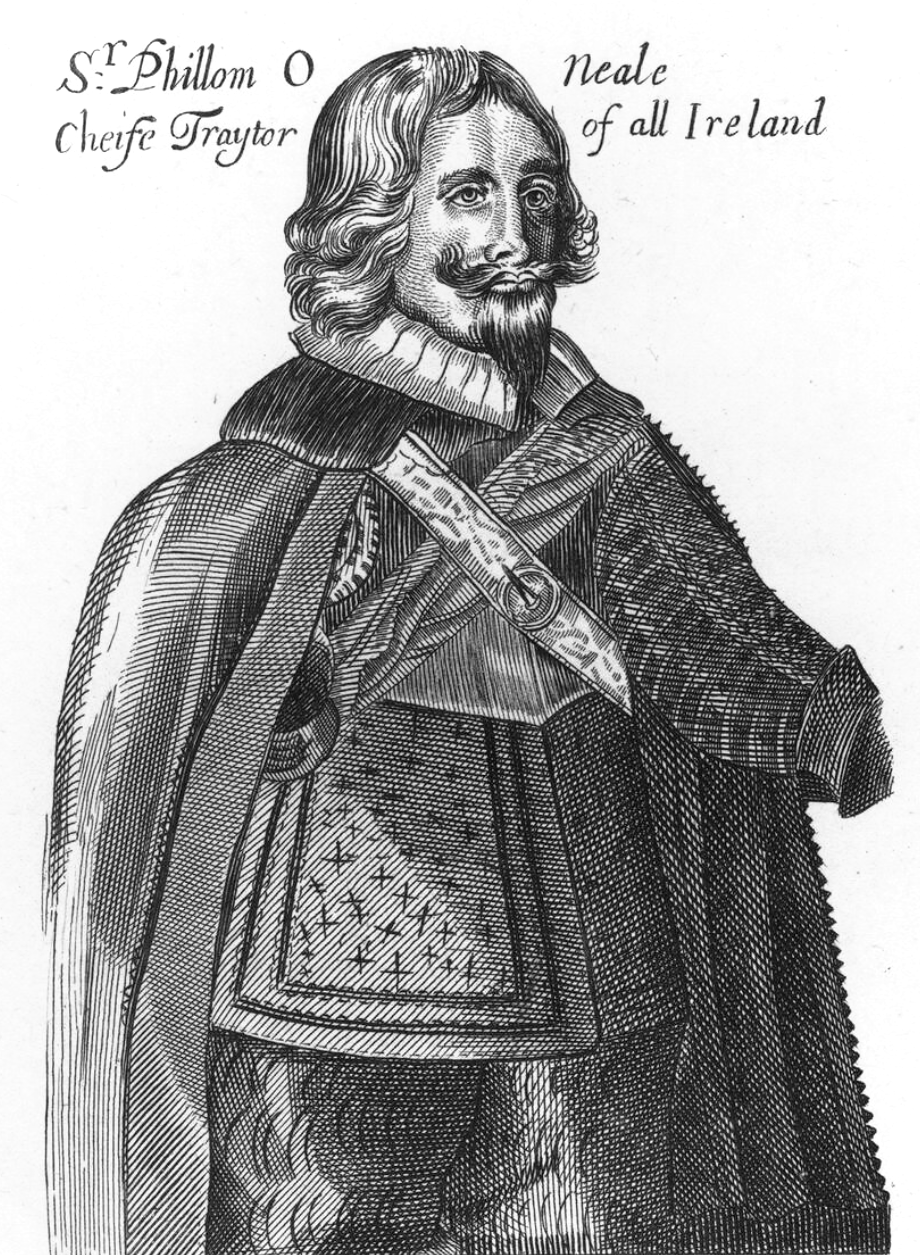
Sir Phelim O'Neill

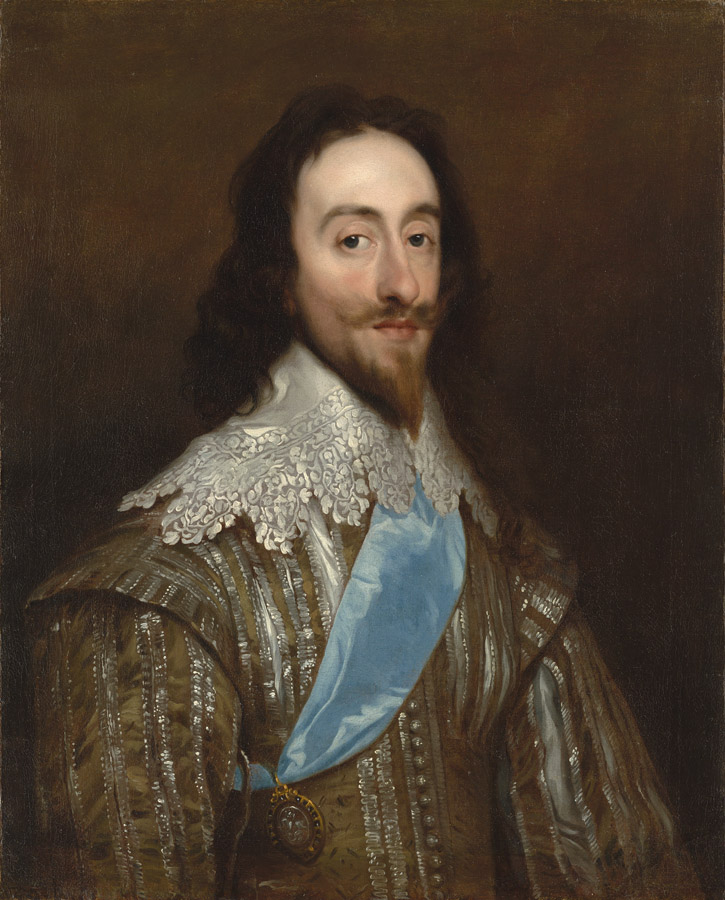
Charles I by Daniël Mijtens

O'Neill was a latecomer to the plot, brought into it by Lord Maguire in early September 1641. On 23 October 1641 he surprised Lord Caulfeild in Charlemont Fort. O'Neill was instrumental in shaping many of the political objectives of the rebellion. He rapidly assumed command of the Ulster rising.

=== Outbreak ===
However, the plan to take Dublin was bungled by two conspirators, Maguire and MacMahon, who were captured by the authorities. O'Neill went ahead and started the rebellion in the north, capturing the important fort of Charlemont but quickly found that he could not control the Irish Catholic peasantry he had raised. These people, many of whom had been displaced during the Plantation of Ulster, began attacking the Scottish and English Protestant settlers with varying intensity over a period of 5 months. Being in command, O'Neill has been blamed for complicity or lack of oversight in these massacres, the detail of which is still a matter of contentious debate.

On 24 October 1641 O'Neill issued the Proclamation of Dungannon in which he claimed to have the King's authorisation to rise in defence of the Crown and the Catholic religion. On 4 November 1641 O'Neill repeated these claims in his proclamation alongside Rory Maguire at Newry and read out a commission from Charles I of England dated 1 October, commanding him to seize: "... all the forts, castles, and places, of strength and defence within the kingdom, except the places, persons, and estates of Our loyal and loving subjects the Scots; also to arrest and seize the goods, estates, and persons of all the English Protestants, within the said kingdom to Our use. And in your care and speedy performance of this Our will and pleasure We shall rely on your wonted duty and allegiance to Us which We shall accept and reward in due time." This gave O'Neill's forces the impression that they were acting within the law. Charles later denied having issued the commission.

In November O'Neill attacked Lisburn several times but failed to take it.

Like other rebel leaders, O'Neill had difficulty with the discipline of his troops, which was compounded by his comparative lack of social status. In an effort to improve this O'Neill planned to have himself declared Earl of Tyrone at the historic site of Tullyhogue.

Nalson, in his "History of the General Rebellion in Ireland", described O'Neill as: "Sir Phelemy Roe O Neill, captain-generall of all the rebels, and chieftain of the O Neills, O Hagans, O Quyns, O Mellans, O Hanlons, O Corrs, McCans, McCawells, Mac Enallyes, O Gormelys, and the rest of the Irish septs in the counties of Tyrone and Ardmagh."

== Confederate ==
The rebellion quickly spread to the rest of Ireland. By the spring of 1642 only fortified Protestant enclaves, around Dublin, Cork and Derry, held out. King Charles I sent a large army to Ireland, which would probably have put down the rebellion, had the English Civil War not broken out. As it was, the Irish Catholic upper classes had breathing space to form the Irish Catholic Confederation, which acted as a de facto independent government of Ireland until 1649. Phelim O'Neill was a member of the Confederate's General Assembly, but was sidelined in the leadership of Irish Catholics by wealthier landed magnates.

O'Neill was also sidelined on the military side. After his disastrous defeat on 16 July 1642 at Glenmaquin near Raphoe in County Donegal against the Protestant Laggan Army led by Sir Robert Stewart, his kinsman, Owen Roe O'Neill, a professional soldier, arrived from the Spanish Netherlands and was made general of the Confederate's Ulster army. Phelim O'Neill served as cavalry commander under him and spent most of the next six years fighting against the Scottish Covenanter army that had landed in Ulster. He fought in the army's victory at the Battle of Benburb on 5 June 1646.

In Confederate politics, O'Neill was a moderate, advocating a deal with Charles I and the Irish and English Royalists as a means of winning the war against the English Parliament and the Scottish Covenanters. In 1648, he voted for such a deal, the Second Ormond Peace, splitting with Owen Roe O'Neill, who opposed it along with most of the Ulster army. He and several other moderates such as Alexander MacDonnell, 3rd Earl of Antrim and Arthur Magennis, Viscount Iveagh left the Ulster army because of their dispute with the hard-liners. In the summer of that year, the Confederate armies fought among themselves over this issue, with the pro-Royalists prevailing.

However, this was not enough to stop Ireland from being conquered by the New Model Army of Oliver Cromwell in 1649–53. The well-trained and supplied Parliamentarians crushed all Confederate and Royalist resistance and imposed a harsh settlement on Irish Catholics.

== Third marriage ==
In November 1649 O'Neill married Jean Gordon, the widow of Claud Hamilton, 2nd Baron Hamilton of Strabane, who had died on 14 June 1638.

== Defeat at Scarrifholis and surrender of Charlemont ==
O'Neill fought in the Ulster Army at the Battle of Scarrifholis in 1650 where it was routed by Charles Coote, 2nd Baronet of Castle Cuff. O'Neill escaped from the battle and retreated with a rest of the Ulster army to the Charlemont Fort. Together with his stepson James Hamilton, 3rd Baron Hamilton of Strabane he held the fort against Coote, inflicting heavy casualties on the English troops in the Siege of Charlemont, but surrendered on terms on 6 August 1650 and marching away with his remaining troops was expected to embark and take service in France. However, O'Neill decided to rather go into hiding.

== Trial and execution ==
Anyone implicated in the Rebellion of 1641 was held responsible for the massacres of Protestant civilians and was executed. O'Neill was specifically named as a ringleader in the Cromwellian Act for the Settlement of Ireland 1652 and could therefore expect no mercy. A bounty of £100 was put on his head. O'Neill was captured on 4 February 1653 by William Caulfeild, 1st Viscount Charlemont on a crannog (artificial island) in Roughan Lough next to Roughan Castle, Newmills, County Tyrone where he had taken refuge. He was taken to Dublin, where his trial was held. He was found guilty, hanged, drawn and quartered for treason on 10 March 1653.

O'Neill may have been able to avoid execution had he testified that he had Charles I's commission for the uprising of 1641, as the Parliamentarians claimed at the time. However, O'Neill refused to do so. He was survived by at least one child, Gordon O'Neill, who would serve as a colonel in the Jacobite forces during the Williamite War.

Timeline
Remark: as his birth date is uncertain, so are all his ages. Italics for historical background.
Age	Date	Event
0	1604	Born
3–4	20 Jun 1608	Father and grandfather killed by the insurgents during O'Doherty's rebellion
16–17	Jun 1621	Entered King's Inns and studied law.
20–21	27 Mar 1625	Accession of Charles I, succeeding James I
24–25	1629	Married 1st wife, a daughter of Thomas Magennis, brother of Arthur Magennis, 3rd Viscount Iveagh
34–35	17 Mar 1639	Knighted by Thomas Wentworth, Lord Deputy of Ireland at Dublin.
36–37	28 Oct 1641	Took Charlemont Fort by surprise
36–37	28 Nov 1641	Failed to capture Lisburn
37–38	6 Jul 1642	Lost the Battle of Glenmaquin
41–42	5 Jun 1646	Fought at the Battle of Benburb
44–45	30 Jan 1649	Charles I beheaded.
44–45	Nov 1649	Married his 3rd wife Jean Gordon, the widow of Claud Hamilton, 2nd Baron Hamilton of Strabane
45–46	21 Jun 1650	Fought at the Battle of Scarrifholis
45–46	6 Aug 1650	Surrendered Charlemont Fort to Charles Coote, 1st Earl of Mountrath
48–49	10 Mar 1653	Hanged, drawn and quartered for treason

== In literature ==
O'Neill is depicted as a historical character in several books. Annraoi Ó Liatháin's Irish-language novel Dún na Cinniúna centres on the 1651 siege of Charlemont Fort in Tyrone.

O'Neill's defeat at the battle of Glanmaquin in 1642 is described in Darach Ó Scolaí's novel An Cléireach.

== Notes and references ==
=== Sources ===
Subject matter monographs:

- Click here. Casway 2004 in Oxford Dictionary of National Biography
- Click here. McGrath 1997 in A Biographical Dictionary of the Membership of the Irish House of Commons 1640 to 1641
- Click here. Ó Siochrú in Dictionary of Irish Biography
- Click here. Dunlop 1895 in Dictionary of National Biography
- Click here. Webb 1878 in Compendium of Irish Biography
- Click here. Wills 1840 in Lives of illustrious and distinguished Irishmen
- Boyce, David George (1995) [1st pub. 1982]. Nationalism in Ireland (3rd ed.). New York: Routledge. ISBN 0-415-12776-9.
- Casway, Jerrold (1984). Owen Roe O'Neill and the Struggle for Catholic Ireland. Philadelphia: University of Pennsylvania. ISBN 0-8122-7895-X.
- Casway, Jerrold I. (2004). "O'Neill, Sir Phelim Roe [Felim Ruadh] (1603–1653)". In Matthew, Colin; Harrison, Brian (eds.). Oxford Dictionary of National Biography. Vol. 41. New York: Oxford University Press. pp. 856–860. ISBN 0-19-861391-1.
- Corish, Patrick J. (1976a). "Chapter XIII: The Cromwellian conquest". In Moody, Theodore William; Martin, F. X.; Byrne, Francis John (eds.). A New History of Ireland. Vol. III. Oxford: Oxford University Press. pp. 336–353. ISBN 978-0-19-820242-4. – 1650 to 1653
- Corish, Patrick J. (1976b). "Chapter XIV: The Cromwellian regime". In Moody, Theodore William; Martin, F. X.; Byrne, Francis John (eds.). A New History of Ireland. Vol. III. Oxford: Oxford University Press. pp. 354–386. ISBN 978-0-19-820242-4. – 1653 to 1660
- Dunlop, Robert (1895). "O'Neill, Phelim 1604?–1653". In Lee, Sidney (ed.). Dictionary of National Biography. Vol. XLII. New York: MacMillan and Co. pp. 204–208. OCLC 8544105.
- Farrell, Gerard (2017). The 'Mere Irish' and the Colonisation of Ulster, 1570–1641. Cham, Switzerland: Palgrave MacMillan. ISBN 978-3-319-59362-3. – (Preview)
- Fryde, E. B.; Greenway, D. E.; Porter, S.; Roy, I., eds. (1986). Handbook of British Chronology. Royal Historical Society Guides and Handbooks, No. 2 (3rd ed.). London: Offices of the Royal Historical Society. ISBN 0-86193-106-8. – (for timeline)
- Hamilton, Lord Ernest (1920). The Irish Rebellion of 1641 with a History of the Events that Led up to and Succeeded it. London: John Murray. OCLC 1047522860.
- Hickson, Mary Agnes (1884). Ireland in the Seventeenth Century: Or the Massacres of 1641–2. Vol. I. London: Longmans, Green, and Co. OCLC 1047479300. – Preface, Introduction, Depositions
- Hill, George (1877). An Historical Account of the Plantation in Ulster at the Commencement of the Seventeenth Century, 1608–1620. Dublin: McCaw Stevenson and Orr. OCLC 32638560.
- House of Commons (1878). Return. Members of Parliament – Part II. Parliaments of Great Britain, 1705–1796. Parliaments of the United Kingdom, 1801–1874. Parliaments and Conventions of the Estates of Scotland, 1357–1707. Parliaments of Ireland, 1599–1800. London: His/Her Majesty's Stationery Office. OCLC 13112546.
- Lenihan, Pádraig (2001). Confederate Catholics at War, 1641–49. Cork: Cork University Press. ISBN 1-85918-244-5. – Not available online
- McGrath, Brid (1997). "Phelim O'Neill 1603-4 – 1653 Dungannon". A Biographical Dictionary of the Membership of the Irish House of Commons 1640 to 1641 (Ph.D.). Vol. 1. Dublin: Trinity College. pp. 230–231. hdl:2262/77206. – Parliaments & Biographies (PDF downloadable from given URL)
- Ohlmeyer, Jane H. (2001) [1st pub. 1993]. Civil War and Restoration in the Three Stuart Kingdoms: The Career of Randal MacDonnell, Marquis of Antrim (2nd ed.). Dublin: Four Courts Press. ISBN 1-85182-626-2. – (Snippet view)
- Ó Siochrú, Micheál (1997). Confederate Ireland 1642–1649: A Constitutional and Political Analysis (Ph.D.). Dublin: Trinity College. hdl:2262/77228. – (PDF downloadable from given URL)
- Ó Siochrú, Micheál (October 2009). "O'Neill, Sir Phelim". In McGuire, James; Quinn, James (eds.). Dictionary of Irish Biography (online ed.).
- Perceval-Maxwell, Michael (1994). The Outbreak of the Irish Rebellion of 1641. Montreal: McGill-Queen's University Press. ISBN 0-7735-1157-1. – (Preview)
- Shaw, William A. (1906). The Knights of England. Vol. II. London: Sherratt & Hughes. – Knights bachelors & Index
- Warner, Ferdinand (1768). History of the Rebellion and Civil-War in Ireland. Vol. II. Dublin: James William. OCLC 82770539. – 1643 to 1660 and index
- Webb, Alfred (1878). "O'Neill, Sir Felim". Compendium of Irish Biography. Dublin: M. H. Gill & Son. pp. 416–418. OCLC 122693688.
- Wills, Rev. James (1840). "Sir Phelim O'Neile". Lives of Illustrious and Distinguished Irishmen, from the earliest times to the present period. Vol. II. Dublin: MacGregor, Polson & Co. pp. 434–446.

Parliament of Ireland
Preceded by Thomas Madden; Hon. John Chichester	Member of Parliament for Dungannan Borough; 1641–1642; With: Hon. John Chichester	Succeeded by Sir Arthur Chichester; Sir Thomas Bramhall
Peerage of Ireland
