= Claud Hamilton, 2nd Baron Hamilton of Strabane =

Scottish-born Irish Catholic (died 1638)

Claud Hamilton
- Baron Hamilton of Strabane
- Tenure: 1634–1638
- Predecessor: James, 1st Earl of Abercorn
- Successor: James, 3rd Baron H. of Strabane
- Born: about 1605
- Died: 14 June 1638
- Spouse: Jean Gordon
- Issue Detail: James, George, Catherine, & Cecilia
- Father: James, 1st Earl of Abercorn
- Mother: Marion Boyd

Claud Hamilton, 2nd Baron Hamilton of Strabane (c. 1605 – 1638) was the founder of the Strabane branch of the Hamiltons. He died relatively young at about 32 and his wife, Jean Gordon, married Sir Phelim O'Neill, one of the leaders of the 1641 rebellion, after his death.

== Birth and origins ==
Claud Hamilton was born near the beginning of the 17th century, probably in Paisley, Scotland. He was the second son of James Hamilton and his wife Marion Boyd. His father had been created Lord Abercorn by James VI and I in 1603 and was further advanced to Earl of Abercorn in 1606. His paternal grandfather was Claud Hamilton, 1st Lord of Paisley. Claud's mother was a daughter of Thomas Boyd, 6th Lord Boyd of Kilmarnock. Both sides of his family were of ancient Scottish nobility.

His father had been a Protestant, but his mother, Marion Boyd, was a Catholic, who brought him, like all his siblings, up in that religion. His uncle George of Greenlaw pushed in the same direction.

Family tree

Claud Hamilton with wife, parents, and other selected relatives. (Note: This family tree is partly derived from the Abercorn pedigree pictured in Cokayne. Also see the list of children in the text.)

Claud; 1st Lord; Paisley; 1546–1621	Margaret; Seton d. 1616
James; 1st Earl; 1575–1618	Marion; Boyd d. 1632; Recusant	George of Greenlaw & Roscrea d. bef. 1657	Frederick; 1590–1647; Soldier
James; 2nd Earl d. 1670	Claud; 2nd Baron d. 1638	Jean; Gordon	George; 1st Baronet; Donalong d. 1679
George; 3rd Earl c. 1636 – bef. 1683	James; 3rd Baron; 1633–1655	George; 4th Baron; 1636/7 – 1668	James c. 1630 – 1673; Courtier
Claud; 4th Earl; 1659–1691	Charles; 5th Earl d. 1701	James; 6th Earl c. 1661 – 1734

Legend

XXX	Subject of the article	XXX	Earls of Abercorn	XXX	Barons H. of Strabane

Claud had four brothers and four sister, who are listed in his father's article.

== Early life and father's succession ==
Hamilton matriculated at the University of Glasgow in 1621 but seems to have left university without obtaining a degree.

His father died in 1618. His eldest brother succeeded as 2nd Earl of Abercorn and inherited his father's Scottish estates, but the Irish estates had been settled on him and his younger brothers in his father's will. His was the most prestigious of these properties: the Strabane estate and the castle that his father had built there.

His father had also wanted him to inherit the Irish title as baron Hamilton of Strabane to go with the Strabane estate. However, this proved difficult because of the title's ordinary primogeniture succession. The eldest brother therefore obligatorily succeeded to the title in 1618 and then resigned it, so that the title could be regranted to his younger brother by the crown. This took time and was only to happen in 1633.

His father predeceased his grandfather, who still was Lord of Paisley and held the lands of the former Scottish abbey, which Claud's eldest brother eventually inherited in 1621.

== Algeo's crime ==
In May 1628 Hamilton's servant Claud Algeo was suspected to be a Catholic and was served with a convocation to appear at the presbytery of Paisley by Ramsay, an officer of the Church of Scotland. However, Algeo assaulted Ramsay and Claud Hamilton supported him. Claud was briefly jailed in June 1628 in Edinburgh Castle for abetting his servant in an assault and ordered to pay £40 to Ramsay. Claud Algeo fled to his master's Irish estates.

== Lord Strabane by regrant ==
In 1633, his elder brother, James, the 2nd Earl of Abercorn in Scotland and the 1st Baron Hamilton of Strabane in Ireland, resigned his Irish title to the crown, which regranted it to Claud on 14 August 1634, with the original precedence. He thereby became the 2nd Baron Hamilton of Strabane.

== Marriage and children ==
On 28 November 1632, Lord Strabane, as he was now, married Jean Gordon, fourth daughter of George Gordon, 1st Marquess of Huntly. The Huntlys were a Catholic family from Aberdeenshire Scotland.

Claud and Jean had two sons:

1. James (1633 – 1655), became the 3rd Baron Hamilton of Strabane
2. George (1636/7 – 1668), became the 4th Baron Hamilton of Strabane

—and two daughters:

1. Catherine (died 1670/1), married James Hamilton of Manorhamilton, the eldest brother of Gustavus Hamilton, 1st Viscount Boyne and two other husbands afterwards
2. Cecilia, also called Mariana, married Richard Perkins of Lifford

== Death and timeline ==
Lord Strabane died on 14 June 1638, probably at the Castle of Strabane, and was buried at Leckpatrick, Strabane, County Tyrone. He was only in his thirties. His eldest son, James, succeeded him at the age of five as the 3rd Baron Hamilton of Strabane. His widow married Sir Phelim O'Neill in November 1649.

Timeline
As his birth date is uncertain, so are all his ages.
Age	Date	Event
0	1605, estimate	Born. (Note: Claud, being the 2nd son, must be born several years before the fourth son, George, who was born about 1607.)
12–13	1618, 23 Mar	Father died and he inherited Strabane.
15–16	1621	Grandfather died.
19–20	1625, 27 Mar	Accession of King Charles I, succeeding King James I
22–23	1628	Servant Algeo's crime.
26–27	1632, 28 Nov	Married Jean Gordon.
27–28	1633	Made 2nd Baron Hamilton of Strabane by regrant.
32–33	1638, 14 Jun	Died and was buried at Leckpatrick.

== Notes and references ==
=== Sources ===
- Brown, Peter Hume, ed. (1900). Register of the Privy Council of Scotland. 2nd series. Vol. 2. Edinburgh: H. M. General Register House. – 1627 to 1628
- Burke, Bernard; Burke, Ashworth Peter (1915). A Genealogical and Heraldic History of the Peerage and Baronetage, the Privy Council, Knightage and Companionage (77th ed.). London: Harrison. OCLC 1155471554.
- Cokayne, George Edward (1892). Complete Peerage of England, Scotland, Ireland, Great Britain and the United Kingdom, Extant, Extinct, or Dormant. Vol. IV (1st ed.). London: George Bell and Sons. OCLC 1180828941. – G to K
- Cokayne, George Edward (1903). Complete Baronetage, 1611 to 1800. Vol. III (1st ed.). Exeter: William Pollard & Co. OCLC 866278985. – 1649 to 1664 (for George Hamilton )
- Cokayne, George Edward (1910). Gibbs, Vicary (ed.). The complete peerage of England, Scotland, Ireland, Great Britain and the United Kingdom, extant, extinct, or dormant. Vol. I (2nd ed.). London: St Catherine Press. OCLC 228661424. – Ab-Adam to Basing (for Abercorn)
- Forbes-Leith, William (1889). Narratives of Scottish Catholics under Mary Stuart and James VI (New ed.). London: Thomas Baker. OCLC 457972896.
- Fryde, E. B.; Greenway, D. E.; Porter, S.; Roy, I., eds. (1986). Handbook of British Chronology. Royal Historical Society Guides and Handbooks, No. 2 (3rd ed.). London: Offices of the Royal Historical Society. ISBN 0-86193-106-8. – (for timeline)
- Holmes, Peter (2004). "Hamilton, Claud, first Lord Paisley (1546?–1621)". In Matthew, Colin; Harrison, Brian (eds.). Oxford Dictionary of National Biography. Vol. 24. New York: Oxford University Press. pp. 776–778. ISBN 0-19-861374-1.
- Lodge, John (1789). Archdall, Mervyn (ed.). The Peerage of Ireland or, A Genealogical History of the Present Nobility of that Kingdom. Vol. V. Dublin: James Moore. OCLC 264906028. – Viscounts (for Boyne, Strabane)
- Metcalfe, William Musham (1909). A History of Paisley. Paisley: Alexander Gardner. OCLC 1046586600.
- Millar, Alexander Hastie (1890). "Hamilton, James, first Earl of Abercorn (d.1617)". In Lee, Sidney (ed.). Dictionary of National Biography. Vol. XXIV. New York: MacMillan and Co. pp. 176–177. OCLC 8544105.
- Paul, Sir James Balfour (1904). The Scots Peerage, Founded on Wood's Edition of Sir Robert Douglas's Peerage of Scotland. Vol. I. Edinburgh: David Douglas. OCLC 505064285. – Abercorn to Balmerino (for Abercorn)
- Paul, Sir James Balfour (1910). The Scots Peerage, Founded on Wood's Edition of Sir Robert Douglas's Peerage of Scotland. Vol. VII. Edinburgh: David Douglas. OCLC 505064285. – Panmure to Sinclair (for Sempill)
- Wasser, Michael (2004). "Hamilton, James, first earl of Abercorn (1575–1618)". In Matthew, Colin; Harrison, Brian (eds.). Oxford Dictionary of National Biography. Vol. 24. New York: Oxford University Press. pp. 837–838. ISBN 0-19-861374-1.
- Webb, Alfred (1878). "O'Neill, Sir Felim". Compendium of Irish Biography. Dublin: M. H. Gill & Son. pp. 416–418. OCLC 122693688.

Peerage of Ireland
Preceded by James Hamilton	Baron Hamilton of Strabane; 1634–1638	Succeeded by James Hamilton
