= Robert Stewart (soldier) =

Scottish soldier (died c.1670)

Sir Robert Stewart (died c.1670) was a Scottish soldier who twice served as Governor of Londonderry.

== Biography ==
Robert probably was the fourth son of Robert Stewart, 1st Earl of Orkney and his wife Jean Kennedy. Although details of his origins in Scotland are unclear, he accompanied James I to England in 1603 and in 1609 was deputed to escort 800 troublesome followers of the fugitive Hugh O'Neill, 2nd Earl of Tyrone to Sweden. It is doubtful whether the task was satisfactorily executed as he was detained in Newcastle upon Tyne later that year, accompanied by three ships of Irishmen. He was nevertheless given permission to enter the service of Gustavus Adolphus of Sweden. He remained abroad until c. 1617 after which he was given a grants of land in counties Leitrim, Cavan, and Fermanagh. He again left for the continent this time to fight in the service of Sigismund III of Poland and in 1637 was given permission to recruit soldiers in Ireland to fight for the Swedish crown.

In 1638, he was appointed governor of Culmore Castle on Lough Foyle, which commanded the seaward approaches to the city of Londonderry and was elected in February, 1639 to represent the city in the Irish parliament. After the outbreak of the Irish Rebellion of 1641 he was commissioned by Charles I to raise a regiment in Ireland, with which he managed to relieve Captain Audley Mervyn at Augher. They were unsuccessful in preventing Sir Phelim O'Neill from capturing Strabane but managed to secure the Barony of Raphoe which helped to guarantee the safety of Londonderry. Lack of support from England or Dublin meant that Stewart was forced to exhaust his own resources, and in the following spring his men were reduced to great extremities. Nevertheless, he and Sir William Stewart defeated Sir Phelim O'Neill at Glenmaquin, near Raphoe on 16 June 1642. In 1643 Stewart was briefly made Governor of Londonderry in addition to Culmore.

He continued on the offensive and in a skirmish near Clones on 13 June 1642 overpowered Owen Roe O'Neill. After the collapse of the Royalist cause in Ireland Stewart returned to Scotland but at the Restoration was given a company of foot and reappointed Governor of Londonderry as a reward for his services. He was replaced as Governor of Londonderry in 1661 by Colonel John Gorges, but allowed to retain the governorship of Culmore until his death in about 1670.
