= Charlemont Fort =

Fort in Charlemont, County Armagh, Northern Ireland

- Charlemont, County Armagh
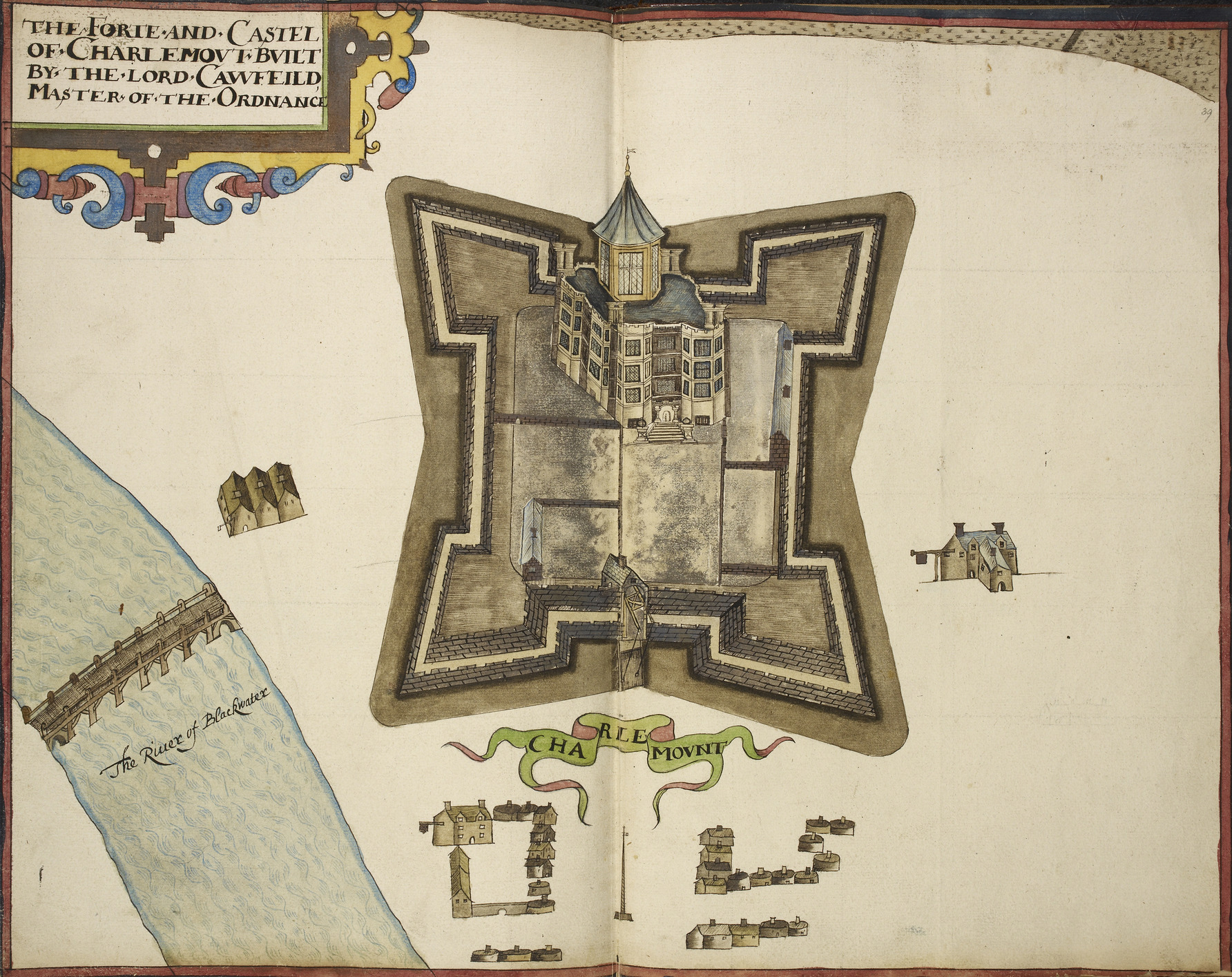
- Charlemont Fort from The State of the Fortes of Ireland in 1624

Site information
- Type: Barracks

Location
- Location within Northern Ireland
- Coordinates: 54°26′53″N 06°40′44″W

Site history
- Built: 1602
- In use: 1602-1858

Charlemont Fort was a garrison situated in Charlemont, County Armagh.

== History ==
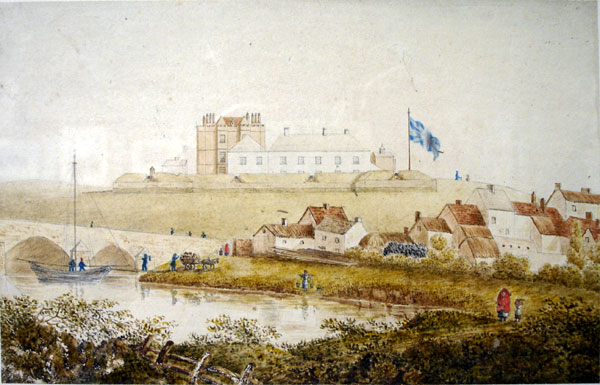
Charlemont Fort in the 18th century

The fort was built in 1602 by Lord Mountjoy. The name Charlemont came from Charles Blount's Christian name. It was situated on the Armagh bank of the River Blackwater, it was armed with 150 men under the command of Sir Toby Caulfield, whose descendants took the name Charlemont from the place.

The Stronghold of Charlemont proved to be of great strategic importance in the Irish Confederate Wars in the 1640s, as it was one of only a handful of modern fortresses to be found in Ireland at that time. It was captured by the forces of Felim O'Neill in 1641 and the Ulster army of the Irish Confederates managed to hold on to the fort throughout the 1640s. O'Neill's forces were able to capture the fort by exploiting his landed status, calling on Lord Caulfield for dinner. It was eventually captured by Charles Coote after he had been reinforced by New Model Army soldiers in late 1650, but hundreds of Coote's soldiers were killed in the effort.

During the 1689-1691 Williamite War in Ireland, it was occupied by a Jacobite force under Teague O'Reagan; while the defences were strong, the garrison was short of provisions and it surrendered to Williamite forces in April 1690.

The fort ceased to be used as a garrison on 14 February 1858. It was destroyed in 1920 by fire and the only building remaining today is the gatehouse.

=== Governors ===
Governors of Charlemont included:

- Henry Barry, 3rd Baron Barry of Santry
- 1719: John Tichborne
- bef. 1754: John Johnston (d. 1770)
- 8 September 1770: James Gisborne
- 27 February 1778: Lieut-General Guy Carleton, 1st Baron Dorchester
- 12 November 1808: Chapple Norton
- 31 March 1818: Albemarle Bertie, 9th Earl of Lindsey
- 21 September 1818: Sir John Doyle, 1st Baronet

== Destruction ==
On 30 July 1920 a group of around forty armed from the Irish Republican Army men seized the fort, which was being occupied by a caretaker, and burned it down. The ruins were sold in 1921 to a masonry contractor. In 1922 the family also lost their great house Roxborough Castle to the same fate.

== See also ==
- Siege of Charlemont
