= Battle of Benburb =

5 June 1646 battle of the Irish Confederate Wars

- Part of the Irish Confederate Wars
- Painting of O’Neill's charge during the battle
Date	5 June 1646
Location	Benburb, County Tyrone 54.412°N 6.746°W
Result	Confederate victory

Belligerents
Irish Confederates	Scottish Covenanters; Laggan Army

Commanders and leaders
Owen Roe O'Neill; Rory Maguire	Robert Monro

Strength
5,000	6,000

Casualties and losses
c. 300	2,000 killed and captured
- Ireland and Benburb

The Battle of Benburb took place on 5 June 1646 during the Irish Confederate Wars, the Irish theatre of the Wars of the Three Kingdoms. It was fought between the Irish Confederates under Owen Roe O'Neill, and an army of Scottish Covenanters and Scottish/English settlers under Robert Monro. The battle ended in a decisive victory for the Irish Confederates and ended Scottish hopes of conquering Ireland and imposing their own religious settlement there.

== Background ==
The Scots Covenanters had landed an army in Ulster in 1642, to protect the Scottish settlers there from the massacres that followed the Irish Rebellion of 1641. They landed at Carrickfergus and linked up with Sir Robert Stewart and the Laggan Army of Protestant settlers from County Donegal in northwest Ulster. The Covenanters cleared northeastern Ulster of Irish rebels by 1643 but were unable to advance south of mid-Ulster, which was held by Owen Roe O'Neill, the general of the Irish Confederate Ulster army.

In 1646, Monro led a force composed of Scottish Covenanter regiments and Ulster settlers armies into Confederate-held territory. According to some accounts, this was the first step in a drive to take the Confederates' capital at Kilkenny; other sources say it was only a major raid. The combined force was about 6,000 strong. Monro had ten regiments of infantry, of whom six were Scottish and four were English or Anglo-Irish, and 600 Ulster Protestant cavalry. Stewart and the Laggan Army were slated to join Monro's force in the attack, however, on the day of the battle the Laggan Army was in Clogher nearly 30 kilometres away. O'Neill, who was a very cautious general, had previously avoided fighting pitched battles. However, he had just been supplied by the Papal Nuncio to Ireland, Giovanni Battista Rinuccini, with muskets, ammunition and money with which to pay his soldiers' wages. This allowed him to put over 5,000 men into the field – an army slightly smaller than his enemy's. The Covenanters had six cannon, whereas the Confederates had none.

== Battle ==
Monro's position on Derrycreevy during the Battle of Benburb, seen from the Irish position on Drumflugh

Monro had assumed that O'Neill would try to avoid his army and had his soldiers march 24 kilometres to intercept the Irish force at Benburb, in modern south Tyrone. Gerard Hayes-McCoy wrote, "many of them must have been close to exhaustion before the battle began". Monro's men drew up with their backs to the River Blackwater, facing O'Neill's troops who were positioned on a rise.

The battle began with Monro's artillery firing on the Irish position, but without causing many casualties. Monro's cavalry then charged the Irish infantry, but were unable to break the Confederates' pike and musket formation. When this attack had failed, O'Neill ordered his infantry to advance, pushing Monro's forces back into a loop of the river by the push of pike. It was noted that the Scottish pikes had shorter shafts and broader, larger heads than those of their opponents, meaning that they were outreached by the Irish. At this point, the fatigue of Monro's troops was apparent as they were gradually pushed back until their formation collapsed in on itself. The Confederate infantry under Rory Maguire then broke Monro's disordered formation with a musket volley at point-blank range and fell in amongst them with swords and scians (Irish long knives). Monro and his cavalry fled the scene, as, shortly after, did his infantry. A great many of them were cut down or drowned in the ensuing pursuit. Monro's losses were estimated to be between 2,000 and 3,000 men, killed or wounded; the Irish casualties were estimated to be 300.

O'Neill's victory meant that the Covenanters were no longer a threat to the Confederates, but they remained encamped around Carrickfergus for the rest of the war. O'Neill did not follow up his victory but took his army south to intervene in the politics of the Irish Confederation. In particular, he wanted to dissuade those who favoured peace with the English Royalists.

The battle is commemorated in the ballad "The Battle of Benburb".

== Sources ==
- Hayes-McCoy, Gerard Anthony (1990). Irish Battles: A Military History of Ireland. Belfast: The Appletree Press. ISBN 0-86281-250-X.
- McKenny, Kevin (2005). The Laggan Army in Ireland, 1640-1685: The Landed Interests, Political Ideologies and Military Campaigns of the North-West Ulster Settlers. Dublin: Four Courts Press.
- Ohlmeyer, Jane H. (1998). "The civil wars in Ireland". In Kenyon, John Philipps; Ohlmeyer, Jane H. (eds.). The civil wars: a military history of England, Scotland, and Ireland, 1638-1660. Oxford London: Oxford university press. ISBN 019866222X.

== General references ==
- Lenihan, Pádraig (2001). Confederate Catholics at War. Cork: Cork University Press.
