= Siege of Charlemont =

Battle during the Irish Confederate Wars in 1650

Coordinates: 54.448°N 6.679°W

- Part of the Cromwellian conquest of Ireland
Date	July – August 1650
Location	Armagh
Result	English victory: Coote takes the fort, but at a heavy cost.

Belligerents
Irish Confederation	Commonwealth of England

Commanders and leaders
Felim O'Neill	Charles Coote

Strength
140	Very high

Casualties and losses
110	c. 500

Ireland and Charlemont

The siege of Charlemont took place in July – 14 August 1650 during the Cromwellian conquest of Ireland when the fortress of Charlemont in County Armagh Ireland was besieged by Charles Coote's Parliamentarian army, which was largely composed of soldiers of the New Model Army. The force led by Coote eventually took the fort from its Irish defenders, but not before they suffered heavy losses, with some 500 Parliamentarian Soldiers being killed during assaults on the formidable stronghold. In terms of the number of soldiers killed in battle, the siege of Charlemont was the second bloodiest engagement fought by the Parliamentarians in Ireland, only surpassed by the siege of Clonmel.

== Background ==
Charlemont was the first stronghold to be captured in the Irish uprising of 1641, seized a force led by Felim O'Neill within 24 hours of the outbreak of the rebellion. It was one of the most modern fortifications in Ireland and as such was one of the few strongholds in northern Ireland to remain in Irish Confederate hands throughout the 1640s.

At the end of 1649, a force of New Model Army soldiers under Robert Venables moved into Ulster and linked up with Charles Coote's small army. The combined force conquered eastern Ulster easily, routing the Scottish Royalist Ulster army at Lisnagarvey. The only serious opposition to the Parliamentarian army came from Felim O'Neill's Ulstermen, who launched a night attack on the Parliamentarian camp, though to little effect.

At the end of 1649, the Irish Ulster army had been momentarily paralysed as a result of the death of Owen Roe O'Neill. In 1650 Heber MacMahon was chosen to lead the Ulster army, and by mid-1650 the force was once again active, pushing into Ulster and threatening the forces under Coote. MacMahon however was a bishop rather than a military man, and at the Battle of Scarrifholis he led the Ulster army to its destruction.

The only senior Irish commander to escape Scarriffhollis was Sir Felim O'Neill. Along with a small number of survivors, he made his way to Charlemont Fort, the last remaining Irish stronghold in Ulster.

Realising that the fort would be near impossible to capture without heavy artillery, Venables and Coote brought siege cannon and mortars with their army when they commenced their attack in late July.

== The commanders ==
Charles Coote, who led the mostly English Ulster army, had a savage reputation – during the Parliamentarian offensive in Ulster in late 1649, he exhibited brutal behaviour, committing atrocities not only against Irish Catholics but also against any Scottish Protestants who resisted his advance. After his victory at Scarrifholis, he executed all the soldiers, regardless of rank, who had surrendered to the lower ranking Parliamentarian officers: Even Henry O'Neill, the son of Owen Roe, was put to death. This was considered to be a shocking atrocity, even by the low standards of the time.

As a Gaelic Irish Catholic, Felim O'Neill had good enough reason to fear Coote, but O'Neill had also featured prominently in English Propaganda pamphlets during the 1640s as the author of a massacre of Protestants. He was thus hated by many Protestant soldiers in Ireland, and the army surrounding him would therefore be particularly vigilant.

O'Neill did however have a few small points to his advantage. Firstly, the fortress at Charlemont was one of the toughest fortresses in Ireland. Secondly, Coote's reputation was by now well known, and no Irish Catholic would be mad enough to willingly surrender to him. The defenders of Charlemont were thus well aware that they would have little hope of survival if the Parliamentarians captured the fortress. The fighting would invariably prove to be fierce.

== The assault ==
By early August, the Parliamentarians had managed to batter a breach in the fortifications. Coote then ordered his troops to cut approach trenches up to the walls. On 8 August the English launched a major assault. Felim O'Neill rallied the entire garrison as well as the civilian inhabitants to mount a vigorous defence at the breach- even the women had armed themselves as best they could. The defence was in many respects a repeat of the defence of Clonmel in May: Hundreds of English soldiers were killed by the desperate defenders, and the remainder were forced out of the breach and back to their lines. After this huge effort the garrison was however exhausted, bloodied, and had used up almost all of their gunpowder and ammunition. As a result, on 14 August O'Neill requested terms of surrender. Sir Felim O'Neill demanded hostages from Coote before he would negotiate the surrender. The terms that O'Neill obtained were that he and his men would march out with bag and baggage after their wounds had healed, and proceed to a port where Coote would have ship waiting to carry them overseas. These were a remarkably generous set of terms from Coote: He probably had no other option, for by now few would be willing to surrender to Coote unless extraordinary conditions were offered.

== Aftermath ==
The fighting at Charlemont was one of the bloodiest conflicts to be fought in Ireland by the Parliamentarians. Although many more soldiers died at Limerick the next year, these deaths were mostly the result of disease. By contrast, almost all the 500 soldiers who died at Charlemont were killed in the attempted storm of the fort. Coote bore a great deal of responsibility for the massive casualties he suffered during the siege. Like other Irish Protestant commanders such as Roger Boyle, he had proven himself ruthless on a number of occasions, executing any enemy who fell into his hands. As such, The Ulster Irish defenders were willing to fight to the death.

Felim O'Neill's defence of Charlemont, as well as his overall defence of Ulster in 1649–50, was vigorous, a contrast to his often incompetent handling of the early years of the Irish uprising. Although the terms of surrender allowed O'Neill to leave, he tried to hide in Ulster, and was eventually found and executed.

The fall of the stronghold was another blow for Ormonde's reputation. In September the Irish bishops excommunicated any Catholic serving Ormonde, and he left Ireland in December.

From a Parliamentarian perspective, the fall of Charlemont completed the English conquest of Ulster and left Sir Charles Coote free to advance on Athlone, the passage to the province of Connacht.

== See also ==
- Irish Confederate Wars
- Wars of the Three Kingdoms
- Irish battles
