= Gaelic Ireland =

Pre-1607 Gaelic political and social order of Ireland

Gaelic Ireland (Irish: Éire Ghaelach) was the Gaelic political and social order, and associated culture, that existed in Ireland from the late prehistoric era until the 17th century. It comprised the whole island before Anglo-Normans conquered parts of Ireland in the 1170s. Thereafter, it comprised that part of the country not under foreign dominion at a given time (i.e. the part beyond The Pale). For most of its history, Gaelic Ireland was a "patchwork" hierarchy of territories ruled by a hierarchy of kings or chiefs, who were chosen or elected through tanistry. Warfare between these territories was common. Traditionally, a powerful ruler like Niall of the Nine Hostages where acknowledged as High King of Ireland. (Note: A succession of High Kings ruled almost continually until 1171; see List of High Kings of Ireland.) Society was made up of clans and, like the rest of Europe, was structured hierarchically according to class. Throughout this period, the economy was mainly pastoral and money was generally not used. A Gaelic Irish style of dress, music, dance, sport and art can be identified, with Irish art later merging with Anglo-Saxon styles to create Insular art.

Gaelic Ireland was initially pagan and had an oral culture maintained by traditional Gaelic storytellers/historians, the seanchaidhthe. Writing, in the form of inscription in the ogham alphabet, began in the protohistoric period, perhaps as early as the 1st century. The conversion to Christianity, beginning in the 5th century, accompanied the introduction of literature. In the Middle Ages, Irish mythology and Brehon law were recorded by Irish monks, albeit partly Christianized. Gaelic Irish monasteries were important centres of learning. Irish missionaries and scholars were influential in western Europe and helped to spread Christianity to much of Britain and parts of mainland Europe.

In the 9th century, Vikings began raiding and founding settlements along Ireland's coasts and waterways, which became its first large towns. Over time, these settlers were assimilated and became the Norse-Gaels. After the Anglo-Norman invasion of 1169–71, large swathes of Ireland came under the control of Norman lords, leading to centuries of conflict with the native Irish. The King of England claimed sovereignty over this territory – the Lordship of Ireland – and the island as a whole. However, the Gaelic system continued in areas outside Anglo-Norman control. The territory under English control gradually shrank to an area known as the Pale and, outside this, many Hiberno-Norman lords adopted Gaelic culture.

In 1542, the Lordship of Ireland became the Kingdom of Ireland when Henry VIII of England was given the title of King of Ireland by the Parliament of Ireland. The English then began to extend their control over the island. By 1607, Ireland was, from the perspective of the British Empire, fully under English control.

== Culture and society ==
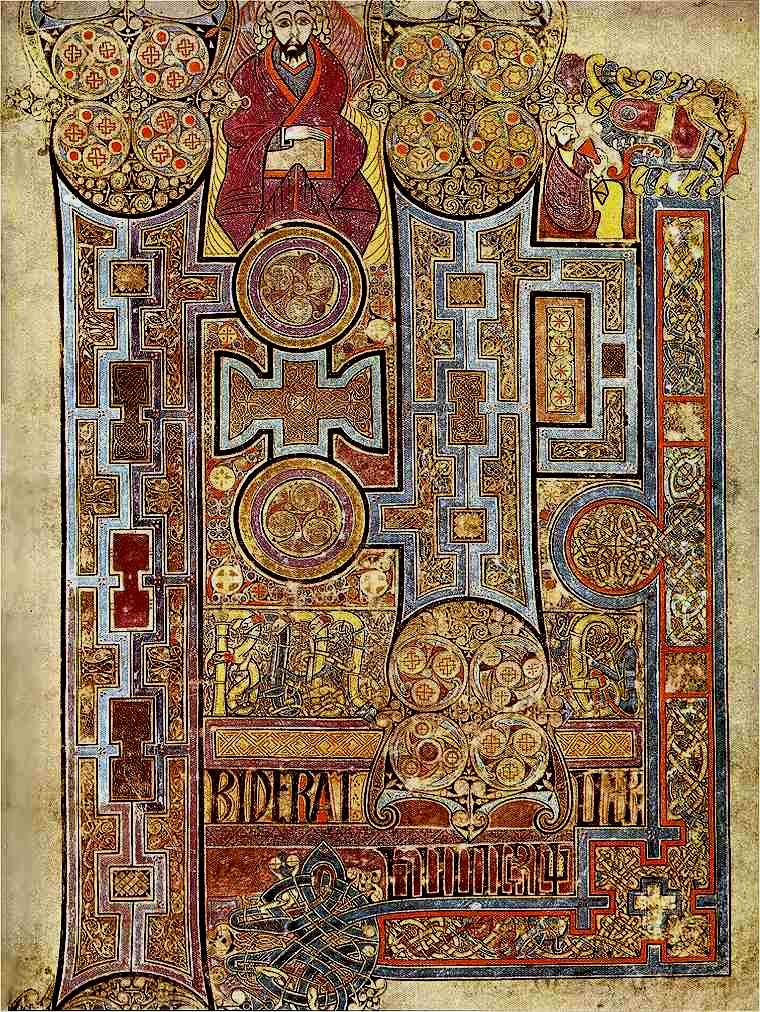
A page from the Book of Kells, made by Gaelic monastic scribes in the 9th century

Gaelic culture and society were centred around a kinship structure known as the (derb)fine. Gaelic Ireland had a rich oral culture and appreciation of deeper and intellectual pursuits. Filí and draoithe (druids) were held in high regard during Pagan times and orally passed down the history and traditions of their people. Later, many of their spiritual and intellectual tasks were passed on to Christian monks, after said religion prevailed from the 5th century onwards. However, the filí continued to hold a high position. Poetry, music, storytelling, literature and other art forms were highly prized and cultivated in both pagan and Christian Gaelic Ireland. Hospitality, bonds of kinship and the fulfilment of social and ritual responsibilities were highly important.

Like Britain, Gaelic Ireland consisted not of one single unified kingdom, but several. The main kingdoms were Ulaid (Ulster), Mide (Meath), Laigin (Leinster), Muma (Munster, consisting of Iarmuman, Tuadmumain and Desmumain), Connacht, Bréifne (Breffny), In Tuaiscert (The North), and Airgíalla (Oriel). Each of these overkingdoms were built upon lordships known as túatha (singular: túath). Law tracts from the early 700s describe a hierarchy of kings: kings of túath subject to kings of several túatha who again were subject to the regional overkings. Already before the 8th century these overkingdoms had begun to replace the túatha as the basic sociopolitical unit.

=== Religion and mythology ===
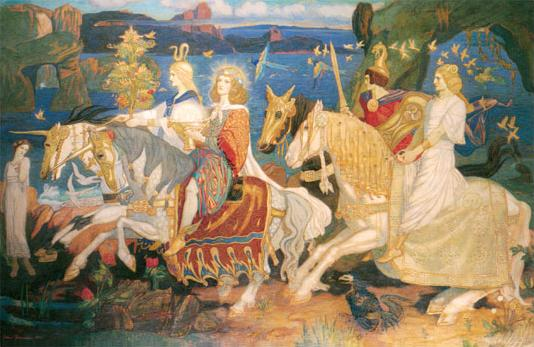
The Tuatha Dé Danann as depicted in John Duncan's "Riders of the Sídhe" (1911)

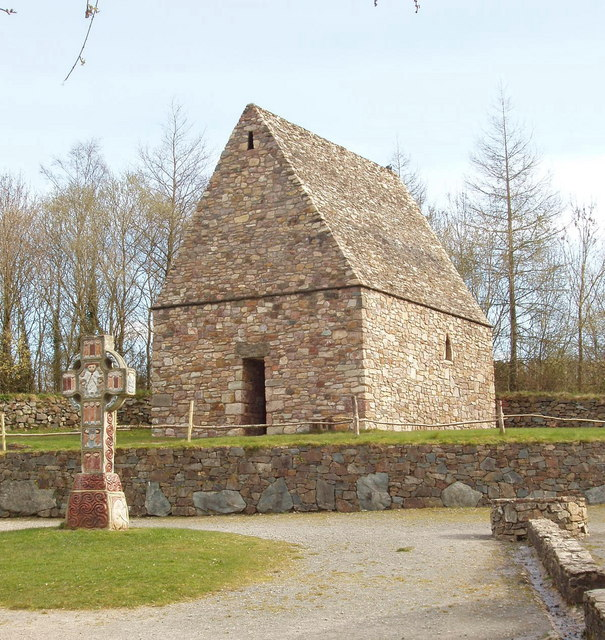
A reconstruction of an early Irish Christian chapel and high cross

==== Paganism ====
Before Christianization, the Gaelic Irish were polytheistic or pagan. They had many gods and goddesses, which generally have parallels in the pantheons of other European nations. Two groups of supernatural beings who appear throughout Irish mythology—the Tuatha Dé Danann and Fomorians—are believed to represent the Gaelic pantheon. They were also animists, believing that all aspects of the natural world contained spirits, and that these spirits could be communicated with. Burial practices—which included burying food, weapons, and ornaments with the dead—suggest a belief in life after death. Some have equated this afterlife with the Otherworld realms known as Magh Meall and Tír na nÓg in Irish mythology. There were four main religious festivals each year, marking the traditional four divisions of the year – Samhain, Imbolc, Bealtaine and Lughnasadh.

The mythology of Ireland was originally passed down orally, but much of it was eventually written down by Irish monks, who Christianized and modified it to an extent. This large body of work is often split into three overlapping cycles: the Mythological Cycle, the Ulster Cycle, and the Fenian Cycle. The first cycle is a pseudo-history that describes how Ireland, its people and its society came to be. The second cycle tells of the lives and deaths of Ulaidh heroes and villains such as Cúchulainn, Queen Medb and Conall Cernach. The third cycle tells of the exploits of Fionn mac Cumhaill and the Fianna. There are also a number of tales that do not fit into these cycles – this includes the immrama and echtrai, which are tales of voyages to the 'Otherworld'.

==== Christianity ====
The introduction of Christianity to Ireland dates to sometime before the 5th century, with Palladius (later bishop of Ireland) sent by Pope Celestine I in the mid-5th century to preach "ad Scotti in Christum" or in other words to minister to the Scoti or Irish "believing in Christ". Early medieval traditions credit Saint Patrick as being the first Primate of Ireland. Christianity would eventually supplant the existing pagan traditions, with the prologue of the 9th century Martyrology of Tallaght (attributed to author Óengus of Tallaght) speaking of the last vestiges of paganism in Ireland.

=== Social and political structure ===
In Gaelic Ireland each person belonged to an agnatic kin-group known as a fine (plural: finte). This was a large group of related people supposedly descended from one progenitor through male forebears. It was headed by a man whose office was known in Old Irish as a cenn fine or toísech (plural: toísig). Nicholls suggests that they would be better thought of as akin to the modern-day corporation. Within each fine, the family descended from a common great-grandparent was called a derbfine (modern form dearbhfhine), lit. "close clan". The cland (modern form clann) referred to the children of the nuclear family.

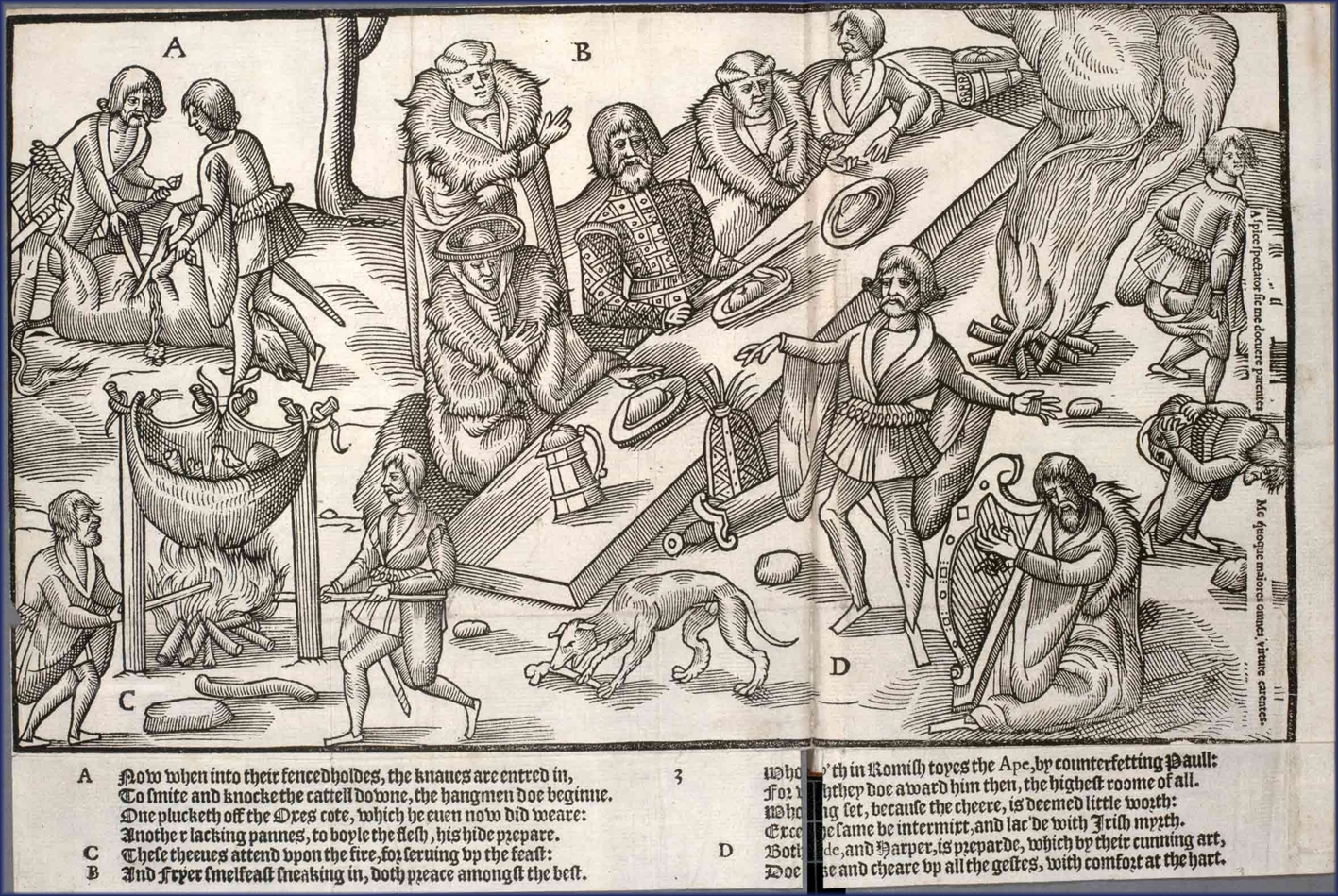
A scene from The Image of Irelande (1581) showing a chieftain at a feast being entertained by a fili and a harper

Succession to the kingship was through tanistry. When a man became king, a relative was elected to be his deputy or 'tanist' (Irish: tánaiste, plural tanaistí). When the king died, his tanist would automatically succeed him. The tanist had to share the same derbfine and he was elected by other members of the derbfine. Tanistry meant that the kingship usually went to whichever relative was deemed to be the most fitting. Sometimes there would be more than one tanist at a time and they would succeed each other in order of seniority. Some Anglo-Norman lordships later adopted tanistry from the Irish.

Gaelic Ireland was divided into a hierarchy of territories ruled by a hierarchy of kings and chiefs. The smallest territory was the túath (plural: túatha), which was typically the territory of a single kin-group. It was ruled by a rí túaithe (king of a túath) or toísech túaithe (leader of a túath). Several túatha formed a mór túath (overkingdom), which was ruled by a rí mór túath or ruirí (overking). Several mór túatha formed a cóiced (province), which was ruled by a rí cóicid or rí ruirech (provincial king). In the early Middle Ages the túatha was the main political unit, but over time they were subsumed into bigger conglomerate territories and became much less important politically.

Gaelic society was structured hierarchically, with those further up the hierarchy generally having more privileges, wealth and power than those further down.

- The top social layer was the sóernemed, which included kings, tanists, ceann finte, fili, clerics, and their immediate families. The roles of a file included reciting traditional lore, eulogizing the king and satirizing injustices within the kingdom. Before the Christianization of Ireland, this group also included the druids (druí) and vates (fáith).
- Below that were the dóernemed, which included professionals such as jurists (brithem), physicians, skilled craftsmen, skilled musicians, scholars, and so on. A master in a particular profession was known as an ollam (modern spelling: ollamh). The various professions—including law, poetry, medicine, history and genealogy—were associated with particular families and the positions became hereditary. Since the poets, jurists and doctors depended on the patronage of the ruling families, the end of the Gaelic order brought their demise.
- Below that were freemen who owned land and cattle (for example the bóaire).
- Below that were freemen who did not own land or cattle, or who owned very little.
- Below that were the unfree, which included serfs and slaves. Slaves were typically criminals (debt slaves) or prisoners of war. Slavery and serfdom was inherited, though slavery in Ireland had died out by 1200.
- The warrior bands known as fianna generally lived apart from society. A fian was typically composed of young men who had not yet come into their inheritance of land. A member of a fian was called a fénnid and the leader of a fian was a rígfénnid. Geoffrey Keating, in his 17th-century History of Ireland, says that during the winter the fianna were quartered and fed by the nobility, during which time they would keep order on their behalf. But during the summer, from Bealtaine to Samhain, they were beholden to live by hunting for food and for hides to sell.

Although distinct, these ranks were not utterly exclusive castes like those of India. It was possible to rise or sink from one rank to another. Rising upward could be achieved a number of ways, such as by gaining wealth, by gaining skill in some department, by qualifying for a learned profession, by showing conspicuous valour, or by performing some service to the community. An example of the latter is a person choosing to become a briugu (hospitaller). A briugu had to have his house open to any guests, which included feeding no matter how big the group. For the briugu to fulfill these duties, he was allowed more land and privileges, but this could be lost if he ever refused guests.

A freeman could further himself by becoming the client of one or more lords. The lord made his client a grant of property (i.e. livestock or land) and, in return, the client owed his lord yearly payments of food and fixed amounts of work. The clientship agreement could last until the lord's death. If the client died, his heirs would carry on the agreement. This system of clientship enabled social mobility as a client could increase his wealth until he could afford clients of his own, thus becoming a lord. Clientship was also practised between nobles, which established hierarchies of homage and political support.

The Gaelic Irish society has been described by some as a nearly anarcho-capitalist society. According to Professor Joseph Peden and Murray Rothbard, the túath was the basic political unit, composed of "a body of persons voluntarily united for socially beneficial purposes" with its territorial claim being limited to "the sum total of the landed properties of its members". Civil disputes were settled by private arbiters called brehons and the compensation to be paid to the wronged party, was insured through voluntary surety relationships. Regarding the kings in Gaelic Irish society, Murray Rothbard stated,

The king was elected by the túath from within a royal kin group (the derbfine), which carried the hereditary priestly function. Politically, however, the king had strictly limited functions: he was the military leader of the túath, and he presided over the túath assemblies. But he could only conduct war or peace negotiations as an agent of the assemblies, and he was in no sense sovereign and had no rights of administering justice over túath members. He could not legislate, and when he himself was party to a lawsuit, he had to submit his case to an independent judicial arbiter.

— Murray Rothbard, For a New Liberty

=== Law ===
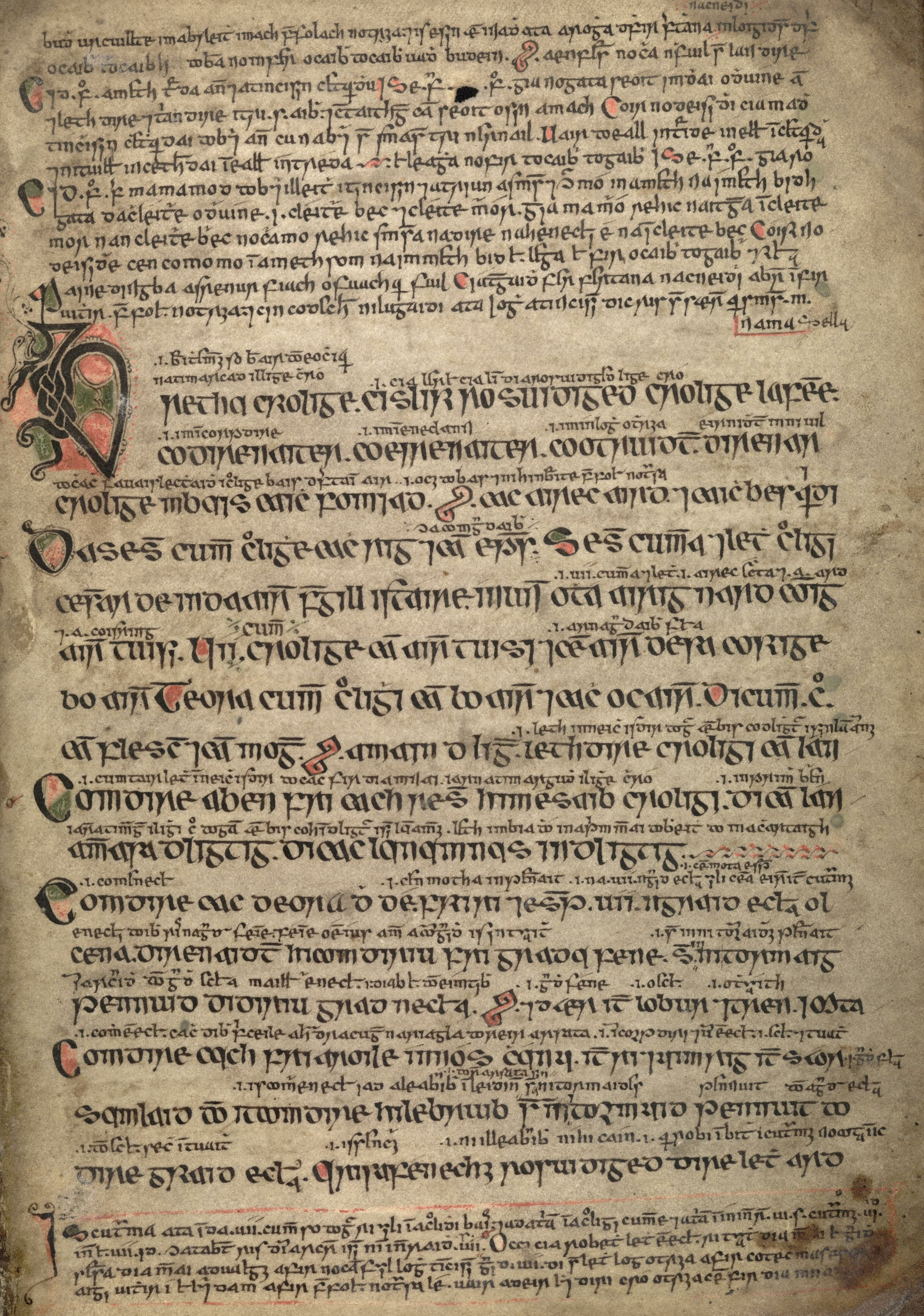
The beginning of Bretha Crólige, an early Irish legal text on illegal injury

Gaelic law was originally passed down orally, but was written down in Old Irish during the period 600–900 AD. This collection of oral and written laws is known as the Fénechas or, in English, as the Brehon Law(s). The brehons (Old Irish: brithem, plural brithemain) were the jurists in Gaelic Ireland. Becoming a brehon took many years of training and the office was, or became, largely hereditary. Most legal cases were contested privately between opposing parties, with the brehons acting as arbitrators.

Offences against people and property were primarily settled by the offender paying compensation to the victims. Although any such offence required compensation, the law made a distinction between intentional and unintentional harm, and between murder and manslaughter. If an offender did not pay outright, his property was seized until he did so. Should the offender be unable to pay, his family would be responsible for doing so. Should the family be unable or unwilling to pay, responsibility would broaden to the wider kin-group. Hence, it has been argued that "the people were their own police". Acts of violence were generally settled by payment of compensation known as an éraic fine; the Gaelic equivalent of the Welsh galanas and the Germanic weregild. If a free person was murdered, the éraic was equal to 21 cows, regardless of the victim's rank in society. Each member of the murder victim's agnatic kin-group received a payment based on their closeness to the victim, their status, and so forth. There were separate payments for the kin-group of the victim's mother, and for the victim's foster-kin.

Execution seems to have been rare and carried out only as a last resort. If a murderer was unable or unwilling to pay éraic and was handed to his victim's family, they might kill him if they wished should nobody intervene by paying the éraic. Habitual or particularly serious offenders might be expelled from the kin-group and its territory. Such people became outlaws (with no protection from the law) and anyone who sheltered him became liable for his crimes. If he still haunted the territory and continued his crimes there, he was proclaimed in a public assembly and after this anyone might lawfully kill him.

Each person had an honour-price, which varied depending on their rank in society. This honour-price was to be paid to them if their honour was violated by certain offences. Those of higher rank had a higher honour-price. However, an offence against the property of a poor man (who could ill afford it), was punished more harshly than a similar offence upon a wealthy man. The clergy were more harshly punished than the laity. When a layman had paid his fine he would go through a probationary period and then regain his standing, but a clergyman could never regain his standing.

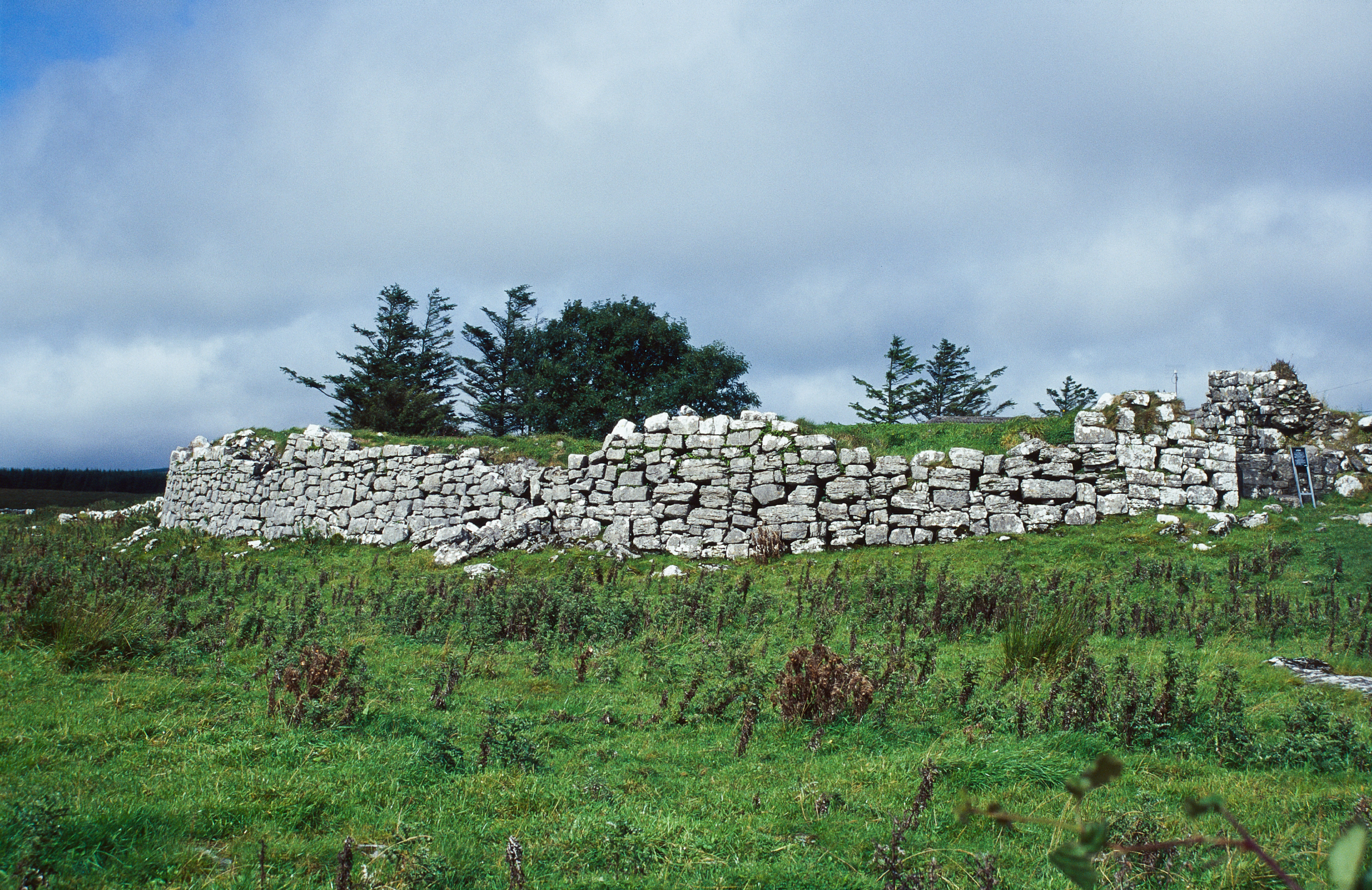
Ruins of the O'Davoren law school at Cahermacnaghten, County Clare

Some laws were pre-Christian in origin. These secular laws existed in parallel, and sometimes in conflict, with Church law. Although brehons usually dealt with legal cases, kings would have been able to deliver judgments also, but it is unclear how much they would have had to rely on brehons. Kings had their own brehons to deal with cases involving the king's own rights and to give him legal advice. Unlike other kingdoms in Europe, Gaelic kings—by their own authority—could not enact new laws as they wished and could not be "above the law". They could, however, enact temporary emergency laws. It was mainly through these emergency powers that the Church attempted to change Gaelic law.

The law texts take great care to define social status, the rights and duties that went with that status, and the relationships between people. For example, ceann finte had to take responsibility for members of their fine, acting as a surety for some of their deeds and making sure debts were paid. He would also be responsible for unmarried women after the death of their fathers.

==== Marriage, women and children ====
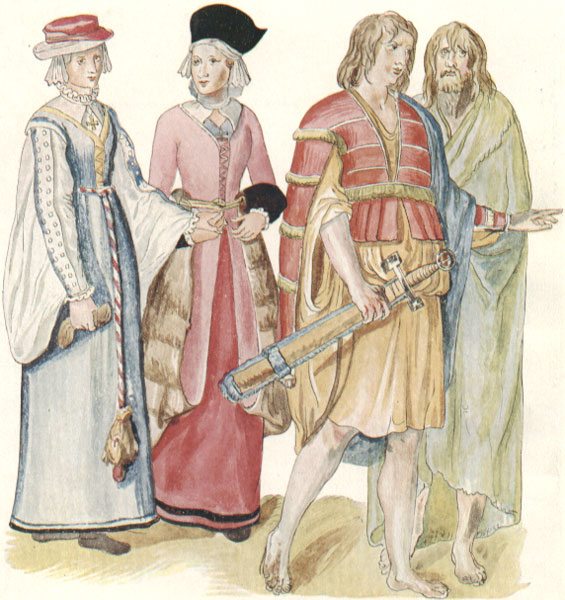
Irish Gaels, c. 1575

Ancient Irish culture was patriarchal. The Brehon law excepted women from the ordinary course of the law so that, in general, every woman had to have a male guardian. However, women had some legal capacity. By the 8th century, the preferred form of marriage was one between social equals, under which a woman was technically legally dependent on her husband and had half his honor price, but could exercise considerable authority in regard to the transfer of property. Such women were called "women of joint dominion". Thus historian Patrick Weston Joyce could write that, relative to other European countries of the time, free women in Gaelic Ireland "held a good position" and their social and property rights were "in most respects, quite on a level with men".

Gaelic Irish society was also patrilineal, with land being primarily owned by men and inherited by the sons. Only when a man had no sons would his land pass to his daughters, and then only for their lifetimes. Upon their deaths, the land was redistributed among their father's male relations. Under Brehon law, rather than inheriting land, daughters had assigned to them a certain number of their father's cattle as their marriage-portion. It seems that, throughout the Middle Ages, the Gaelic Irish kept many of their marriage laws and traditions separate from those of the Church. Under Gaelic law, married women could hold property independent of their husbands, a link was maintained between married women and their own families, couples could easily divorce or separate, and men could have concubines (which could be lawfully bought). These laws differed from most of contemporary Europe and from Church law.

The lawful age of marriage was fifteen for girls and eighteen for boys, the respective ages at which fosterage ended. Upon marriage, the families of the bride and bridegroom were expected to contribute to the match. It was custom for the bridegroom and his family to pay a coibche (modern spelling: coibhche) and the bride was allowed a share of it. If the marriage ended owing to a fault of the husband then the coibche was kept by the wife and her family, but if the fault lay with the wife then the coibche was to be returned. It was custom for the bride to receive a spréid (modern spelling: spréidh) from her family (or foster family) upon marriage. This was to be returned if the marriage ended through divorce or the death of the husband. Later, the spréid seems to have been converted into a dowry. Women could seek divorce/separation as easily as men could and, when obtained on her behalf, she kept all the property she had brought her husband during their marriage. Trial marriages seem to have been popular among the rich and powerful, and thus it has been argued that cohabitation before marriage must have been acceptable. It also seems that the wife of a chieftain was entitled to some share of the chief's authority over his territory. This led to some Gaelic Irish wives wielding a great deal of political power.

Before the Norman invasion, it was common for priests and monks to have wives. This remained mostly unchanged after the Norman invasion, despite protests from bishops and archbishops. The authorities classed such women as priests' concubines and there is evidence that a formal contract of concubinage existed between priests and their women. However, unlike other concubines, they seem to have been treated just as wives were.

In Gaelic Ireland a kind of fosterage was common, whereby (for a certain length of time) children would be left in the care of others to strengthen family ties or political bonds. Foster parents were beholden to teach their foster children or to have them taught. Foster parents who had properly done their duties were entitled to be supported by their foster children in old age (if they were in need and had no children of their own). As with divorce, Gaelic law again differed from most of Europe and from Church law in giving legal standing to both "legitimate" and "illegitimate" children.

=== Settlements and architecture ===
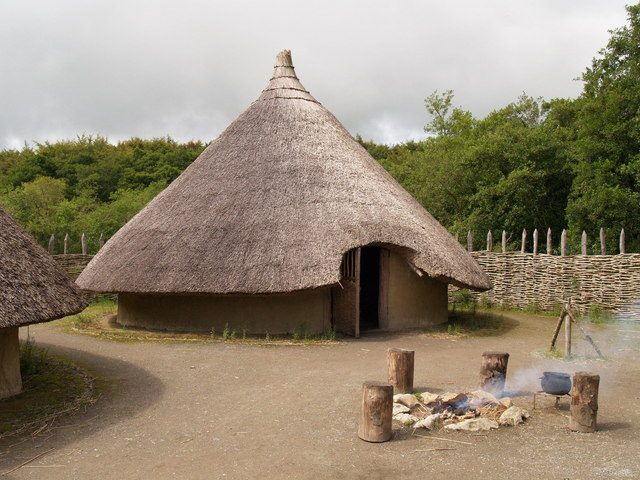
A reconstructed roundhouse and ráth at Craggaunowen, County Clare

For most of the Gaelic period, dwellings and farm buildings were circular with conical thatched roofs (see roundhouse). Square and rectangle-shaped buildings gradually became more common, and by the 14th or 15th century they had replaced round buildings completely. In some areas, buildings were made mostly of stone. In others, they were built of timber, wattle and daub, or a mix of materials. Most ancient and early medieval stone buildings were of dry stone construction. Some buildings would have had glass windows. Among the wealthy, it was common for women to have their own 'apartment' called a grianan (anglicized "greenan") in the sunniest part of the homestead.

The dwellings of freemen and their families were often surrounded by a circular rampart called a "ringfort". There are two main kinds of ringfort. The ráth is an earthen ringfort, averaging 30m diameter, with a dry outside ditch. The cathair or caiseal is a stone ringfort. The ringfort would typically have enclosed the family home, small farm buildings or workshops, and animal pens. Most date to the period 500–1000 CE and there is evidence of large-scale ringfort desertion at the end of the first millennium. The remains of between 30,000 and 40,000 lasted into the 19th century to be mapped by Ordnance Survey Ireland. Another kind of native dwelling was the crannóg, which were roundhouses built on artificial islands in lakes.

There were very few nucleated settlements, but after the 5th century some monasteries became the heart of small "monastic towns". By the 10th century the Norse-Gaelic ports of Dublin, Wexford, Cork and Limerick had grown into substantial settlements, all ruled by Gaelic kings by 1052. In this era many of the Irish round towers were built.

In the fifty years before the Norman invasion, the term "castle" (Old Irish: caistél/caislén) appears in Gaelic writings, although there are few intact surviving examples of pre-Norman castles. After the invasion, the Normans built motte-and-bailey castles in the areas they occupied, some of which were converted from ringforts. By 1300 "some mottes, especially in frontier areas, had almost certainly been built by the Gaelic Irish in imitation". The Normans gradually replaced wooden motte-and-baileys with stone castles and tower houses. Tower houses are free-standing multi-storey stone towers usually surrounded by a wall (see bawn) and ancillary buildings. Gaelic families had begun to build their own tower houses by the 15th century. As many as 7000 may have been built, but they were rare in areas with little Norman settlement or contact. They are concentrated in counties Limerick and Clare but are lacking in Ulster, except the area around Strangford Lough.

In Gaelic law, a 'sanctuary' called a maighin digona surrounded each person's dwelling. The maighin digona's size varied according to the owner's rank. In the case of a bóaire it stretched as far as he, while sitting at his house, could cast a cnairsech (variously described as a spear or sledgehammer). The owner of a maighin digona could offer its protection to someone fleeing from pursuers, who would then have to bring that person to justice by lawful means.

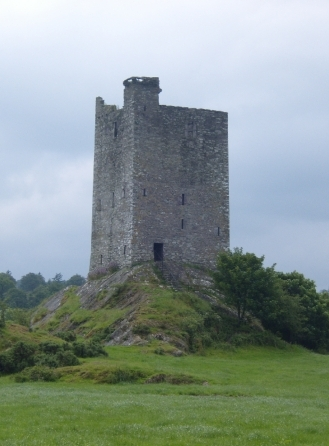
Carrigaphooca tower house

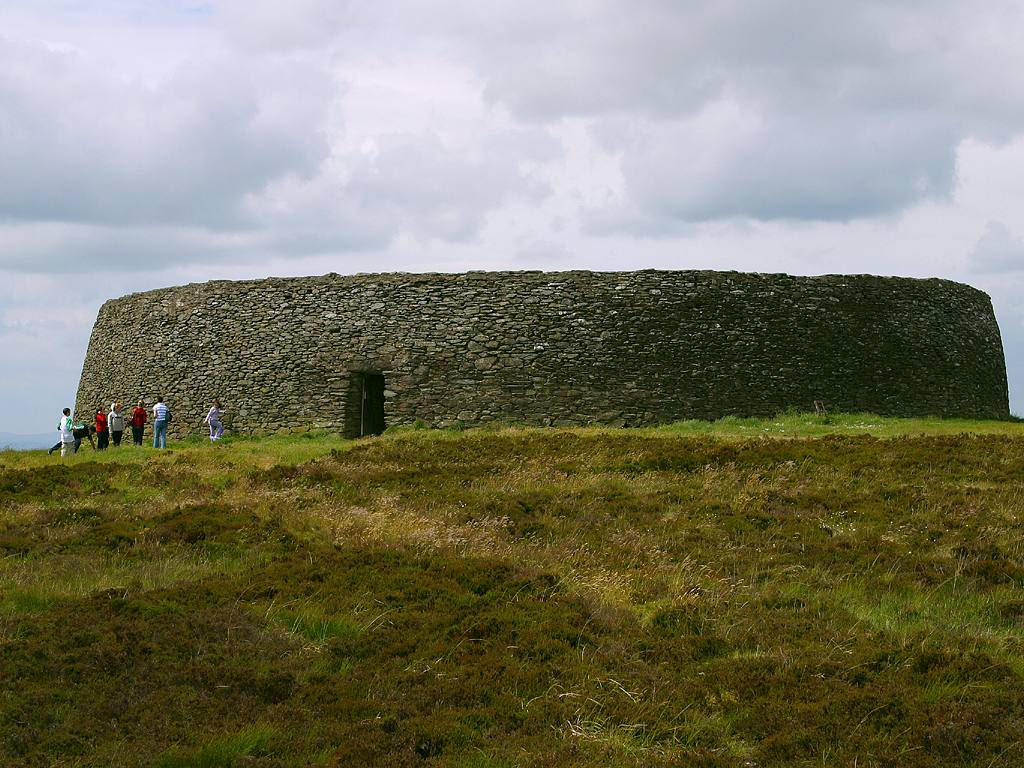
Grianan of Aileach stone ringfort (see inside)

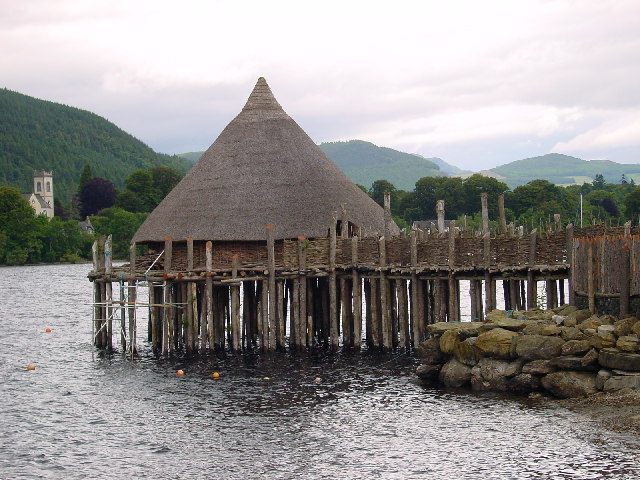
Reconstructed crannóg on Loch Tay

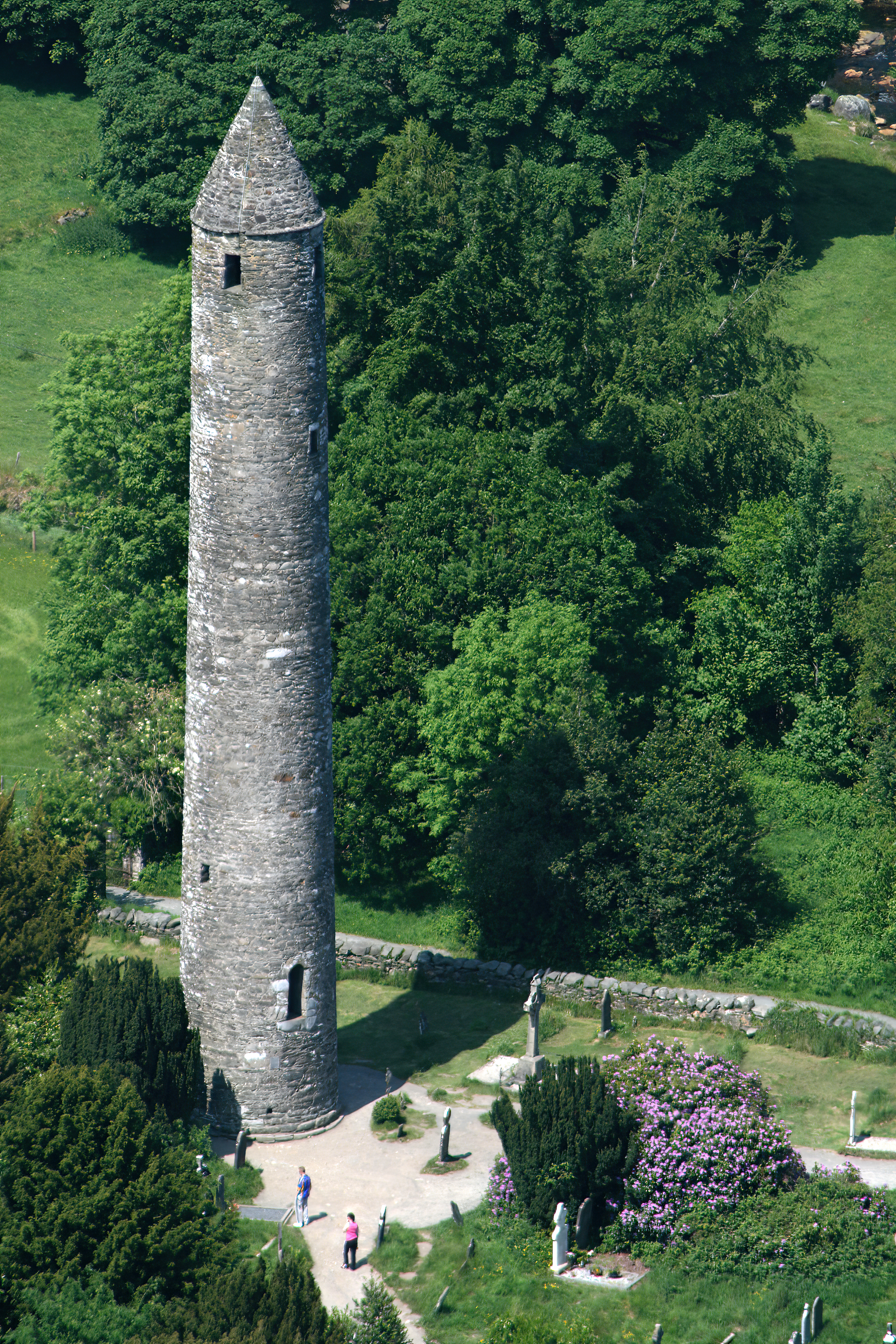
Glendalough round tower

=== Economy ===
Gaelic Ireland was involved in trade with Britain and mainland Europe from ancient times, and this trade increased over the centuries. Tacitus, for example, wrote in the 1st century that most of Ireland's harbours were known to the Romans through commerce. There are many passages in early Irish literature that mention luxury goods imported from foreign lands, and the fair of Carman in Leinster included a market of foreign traders. In the Middle Ages the main exports were textiles such as wool and linen while the main imports were luxury items.

Money was seldom used in Gaelic society; instead, goods and services were usually exchanged for other goods and services (barter). The economy was mainly a pastoral one, based on livestock (cows, sheep, pigs, goats, etc.) and their products. Cattle was "the main element in the Irish pastoral economy" and the main form of wealth, providing milk, butter, cheese, meat, fat, hides, and so forth. They were a "highly mobile form of wealth and economic resource which could be quickly and easily moved to a safer locality in time of war or trouble". The nobility owned great herds of cattle that had herdsmen and guards. Sheep, goats and pigs were also a valuable resource but had a lesser role in Irish pastoralism.

Horticulture was practised; the main crops being oats, wheat and barley, although flax was also grown for making linen.

Transhumance was also practised, whereby people moved with their livestock to higher pastures in summer and back to lower pastures in the cooler months. The summer pasture was called the buaile (anglicized as booley) and it is noteworthy that the Irish word for boy (buachaill) originally meant a herdsman. Many moorland areas were "shared as a common summer pasturage by the people of a whole parish or barony".

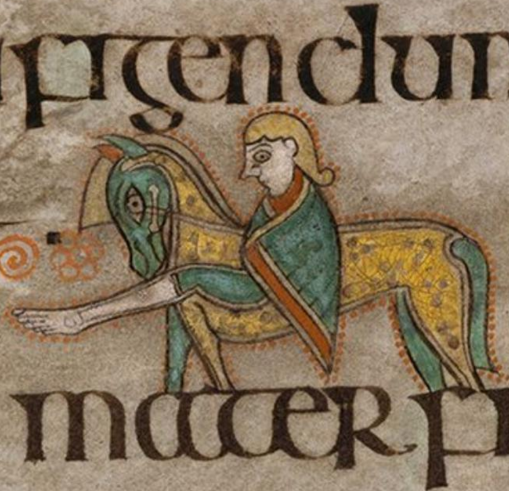
A horse rider from the Book of Kells

=== Transport ===
Gaelic Ireland was well furnished with roads and bridges. Bridges were typically wooden and in some places the roads were laid with wood and stone. There were five main roads leading from Tara: Slíghe Asail, Slíghe Chualann, Slíghe Dála, Slíghe Mór and Slíghe Midluachra.

Horses were one of the main means of long-distance transport. Although horseshoes and reins were used, the Gaelic Irish did not use saddles, stirrups or spurs. Every man was trained to spring from the ground on to the back of his horse (an ech-léim or "steed-leap") and they urged-on and guided their horses with a rod having a hooked goad at the end.

Two-wheeled and four-wheeled chariots (singular carbad) were used in Ireland from ancient times, both in private life and in war. They were big enough for two people, made of wickerwork and wood, and often had decorated hoods. The wheels were spoked, shod all round with iron, and were from three to four and a half feet high. Chariots were generally drawn by horses or oxen, with horse-drawn chariots being more common among chiefs and military men. War chariots furnished with scythes and spikes, like those of the ancient Gauls and Britons, are mentioned in literature.

Boats used in Gaelic Ireland include canoes, currachs, sailboats and Irish galleys. Ferryboats were used to cross wide rivers and are often mentioned in the Brehon Laws as subject to strict regulations. Sometimes they were owned by individuals and sometimes they were the common property of those living round the ferry. Large boats were used for trade with mainland Europe.

=== Dress ===
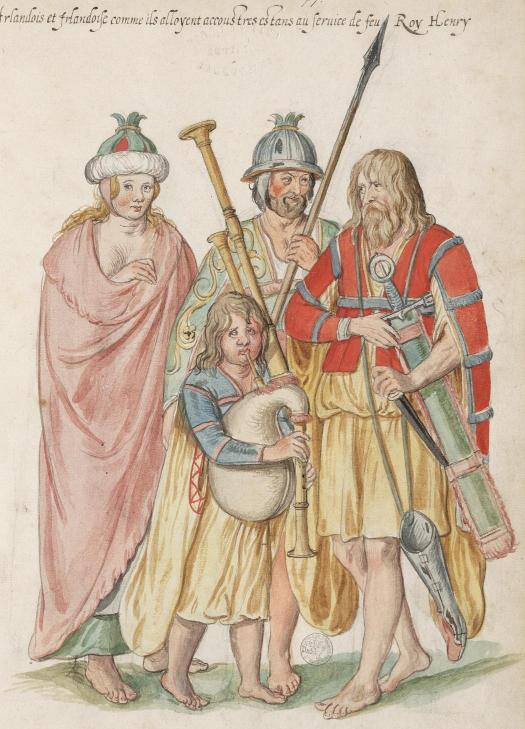
Irish Gaels in a painting from the 16th century

Throughout the Middle Ages, the common clothing amongst the Gaelic Irish consisted of a brat (a woollen semi circular cloak) worn over a léine (a loose-fitting, long-sleeved tunic made of linen). For men the léine reached to their ankles but was hitched up by means of a crios (pronounced 'kriss') which was a type of woven belt. The léine was hitched up to knee level. Women wore the léine at full length. Men sometimes wore tight-fitting trews (Gaelic triúbhas) but otherwise went bare-legged. The brat was simply thrown over both shoulders or sometimes over only one. Occasionally the brat was fastened with a dealg (brooch), with men usually wearing the dealg at their shoulders and women at their chests. The ionar (a short, tight-fitting jacket) became popular later on. In Topographia Hibernica, written during the 1180s, Gerald de Barri wrote that the Irish commonly wore hoods at that time (perhaps forming part of the brat), while Edmund Spenser wrote in the 1580s that the brat was (in general) their main item of clothing. Gaelic clothing does not appear to have been influenced by outside styles.

Women invariably grew their hair long and, as in other European cultures, this custom was also common among the men. It is said that the Gaelic Irish took great pride in their long hair—for example, a person could be forced to pay the heavy fine of two cows for shaving a man's head against his will. For women, very long hair was seen as a mark of beauty. Sometimes, wealthy men and women would braid their hair and fasten hollow golden balls to the braids. Another style that was popular among some medieval Gaelic men was the glib (short all over except for a long, thick lock of hair towards the front of the head). A band or ribbon around the forehead was the typical way of holding one's hair in place. For the wealthy, this band was often a thin and flexible band of burnished gold, silver or findruine. When the Anglo-Normans and the English colonized Ireland, hair length came to signify one's allegiance. Irishmen who cut their hair short were deemed to be forsaking their Irish heritage. Likewise, English colonists who grew their hair long at the back were deemed to be giving in to the Irish life.

Gaelic men typically wore a beard and mustache, and it was often seen as dishonourable for a Gaelic man to have no facial hair. Beard styles varied – the long forked beard and the rectangular Mesopotamian-style beard were fashionable at times.

=== Warfare ===
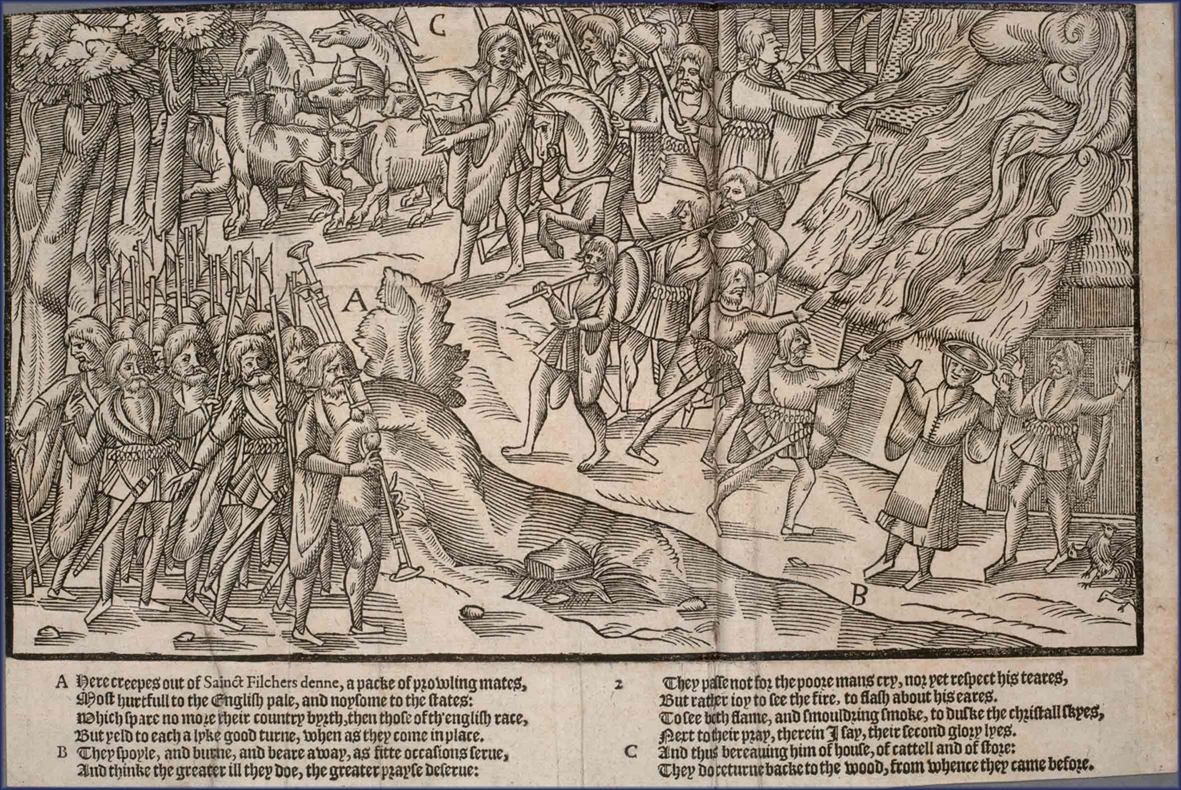
A cattle raid shown in The Image of Irelande (1581)

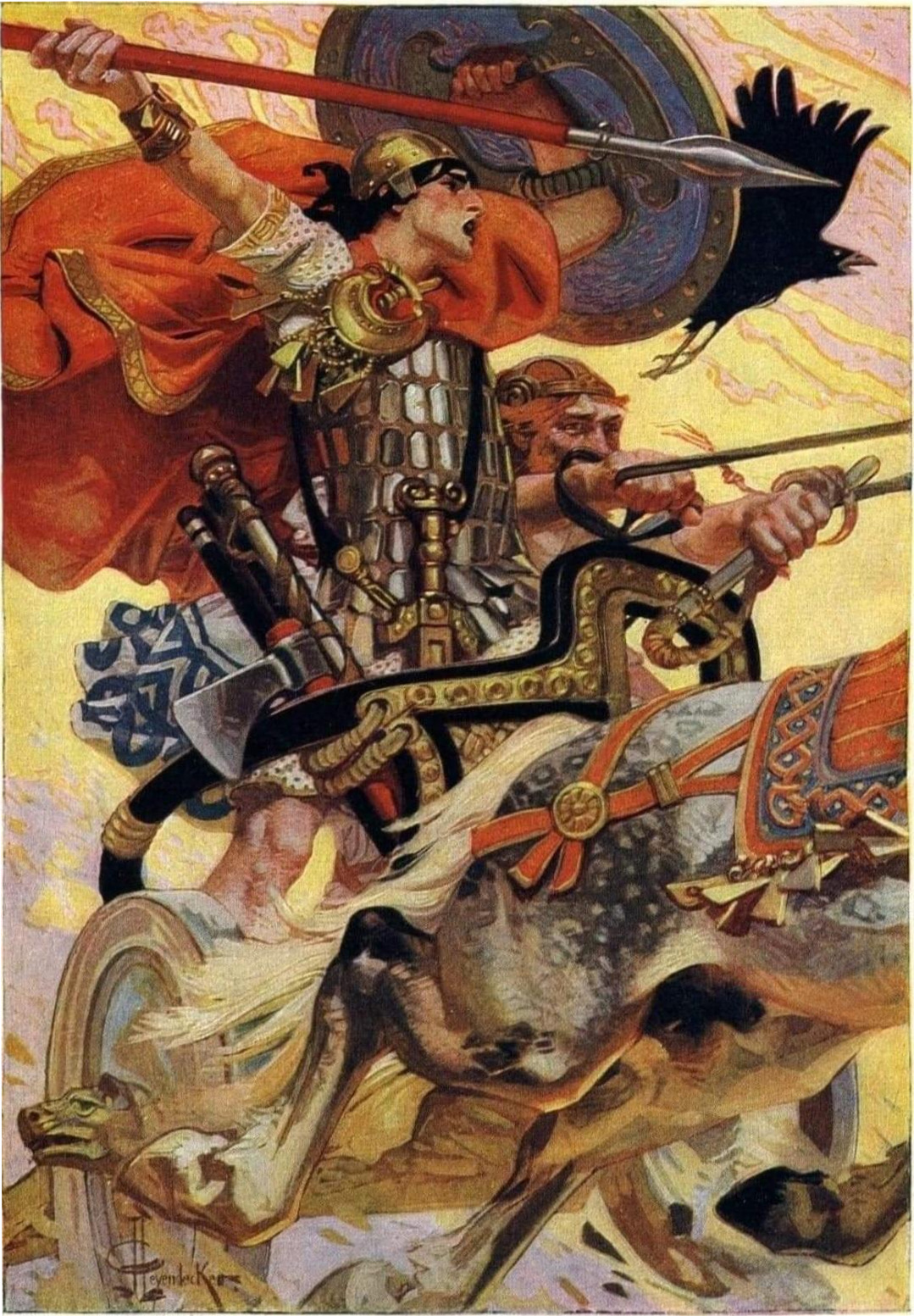
"Cuchulain in Battle", illustration by J. C. Leyendecker in T. W. Rolleston's Myths & Legends of the Celtic Race, 1911

Warfare was common in Gaelic Ireland, as territories, kingdoms and clans fought for supremacy against each other and later against the Vikings and Anglo-Normans. Champion warfare is a common theme in Early Irish mythology, literature and culture. In the Middle Ages all able-bodied men, apart from the learned and the clergy, were eligible for military service on behalf of the king or chief. Throughout the Middle Ages and for some time after, outsiders often wrote that the Irish style of warfare differed greatly from what they deemed to be the norm in Western Europe. The Gaelic Irish preferred hit-and-run raids (the crech), which involved catching the enemy unaware. If this worked they would then seize any valuables (mainly livestock) and potentially valuable hostages, burn the crops, and escape. The cattle raid was a social institution and was called a Táin Bó in Gaelic literature. Although hit-and-run raiding was the preferred tactic in medieval times, there were also pitched battles. From at least the 11th century, kings maintained small permanent fighting forces known as lucht tighe "troops of the household", who were often given houses and land on the king's mensal land. These were well-trained and equipped professional soldiers made up of infantry and cavalry. By the reign of Brian Boru, Irish kings were taking large armies on campaign over long distances and using naval forces in tandem with land forces.

A typical medieval Irish army included light infantry, heavy infantry and cavalry. The bulk of the army was made up of light infantry called ceithern (anglicized 'kern'). The ceithern wandered Ireland offering their services for hire and usually wielded swords, skenes (a kind of long knife), short spears, bows and shields. The cavalry was usually made up of a king or chieftain and his close relatives. They usually rode without saddles but wore armour and iron helmets and wielded swords, skenes and long spears or lances. One kind of Irish cavalry was the hobelar. After the Norman invasion there emerged a kind of heavy infantry called gallóglaigh (anglicized 'gallo[w]glass'). They were originally Scottish mercenaries who appeared in the 13th century, but by the 15th century most large túatha had their own hereditary force of Irish gallóglaigh. Some Anglo-Norman lordships also began using gallóglaigh in imitation of the Irish. They usually wore mail and iron helmets and wielded sparth axes, claymores, and sometimes spears or lances. The gallóglaigh furnished the retreating plunderers with a "moving line of defence from which the horsemen could make short, sharp charges, and behind which they could retreat when pursued". As their armor made them less nimble, they were sometimes planted at strategic spots along the line of retreat. The kern, horsemen and gallóglaigh had lightly armed servants to carry their weapons into battle.

Warriors were sometimes rallied into battle by blowing horns and warpipes. According to Gerald de Barri (in the 12th century), they did not wear armour, as they deemed it burdensome to wear and "brave and honourable" to fight without it. Instead, most ordinary soldiers fought semi-naked and carried only their weapons and a small round shield – Spenser wrote that these shields were covered with leather and painted in bright colours. Kings and chiefs sometimes went into battle wearing helmets adorned with eagle feathers. For ordinary soldiers, their thick hair often served as a helmet, but they sometimes wore simple helmets made from animal hides.

=== Arts ===
==== Visual art ====
Artwork from Ireland's Gaelic period is found on pottery, jewellery, weapons, drinkware, tableware, stone carvings and illuminated manuscripts. Irish art from about 300 BC incorporates patterns and styles which developed in west central Europe. By about AD 600, after the Christianization of Ireland had begun, a style melding Irish, Mediterranean and Germanic Anglo-Saxon elements emerged, and was spread to Britain and mainland Europe by the Hiberno-Scottish mission. This is known as Insular art or Hiberno-Saxon art, which continued in some form in Ireland until the 12th century, although the Viking invasions ended its "Golden Age". Most surviving works of Insular art were either made by monks or made for monasteries, with the exception of brooches, which were likely made and used by both clergy and laity. Examples of Insular art from Ireland include the Book of Kells, Muiredach's High Cross, the Tara Brooch, the Ardagh Hoard the Derrynaflan Chalice, and the late Cross of Cong, which also uses Viking styles.

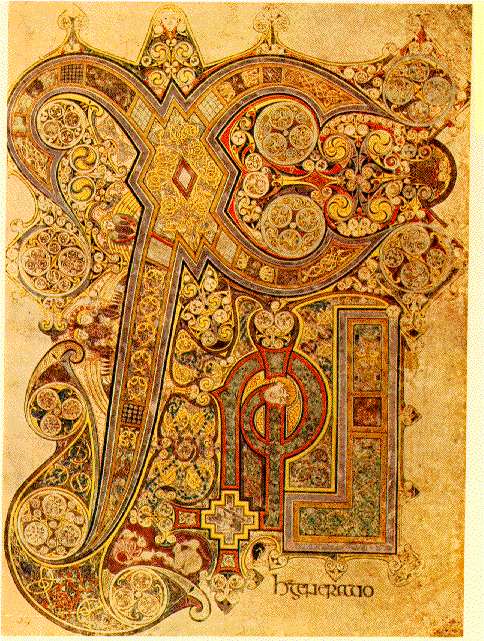
Book of Kells

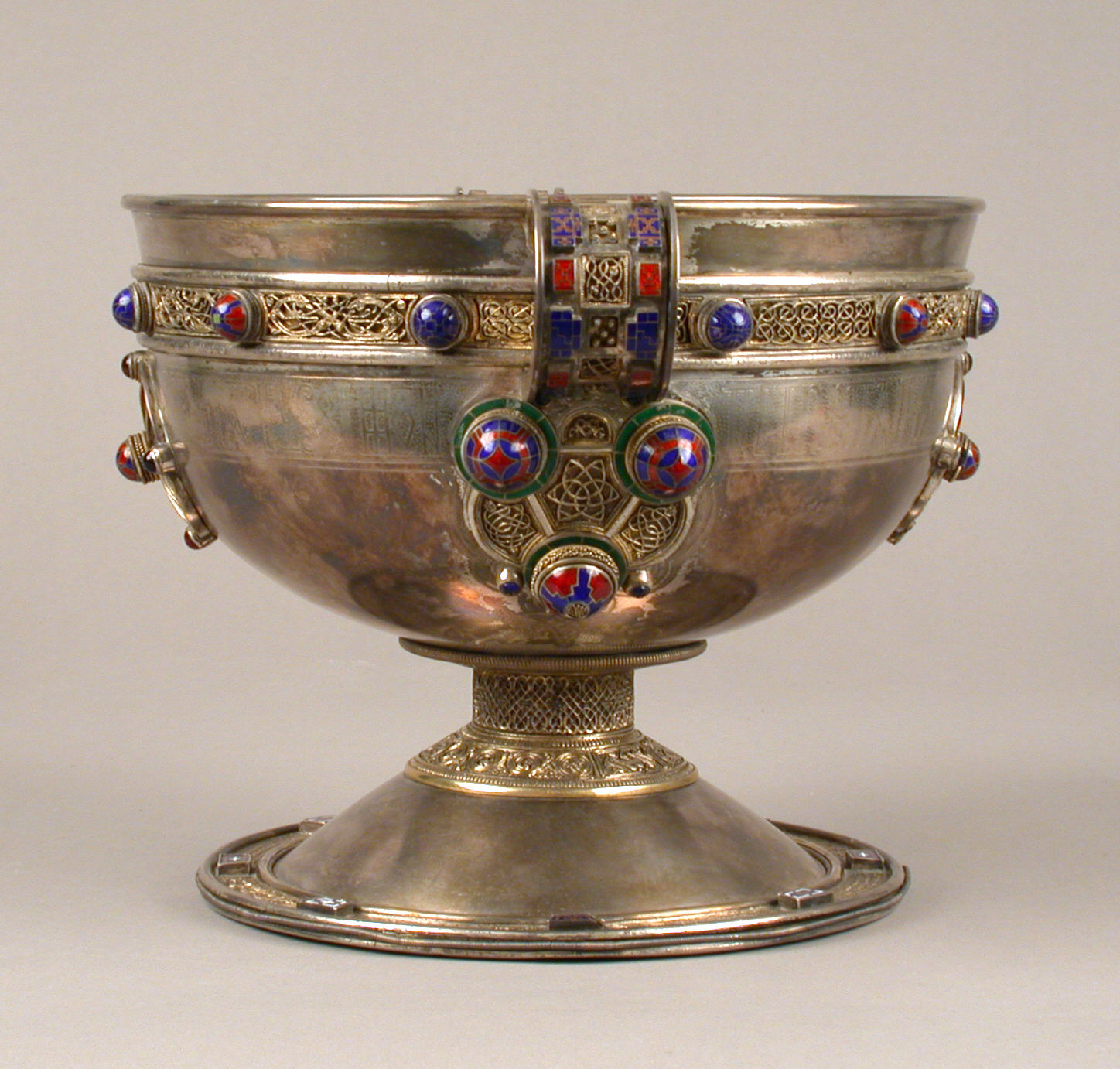
Ardagh Chalice

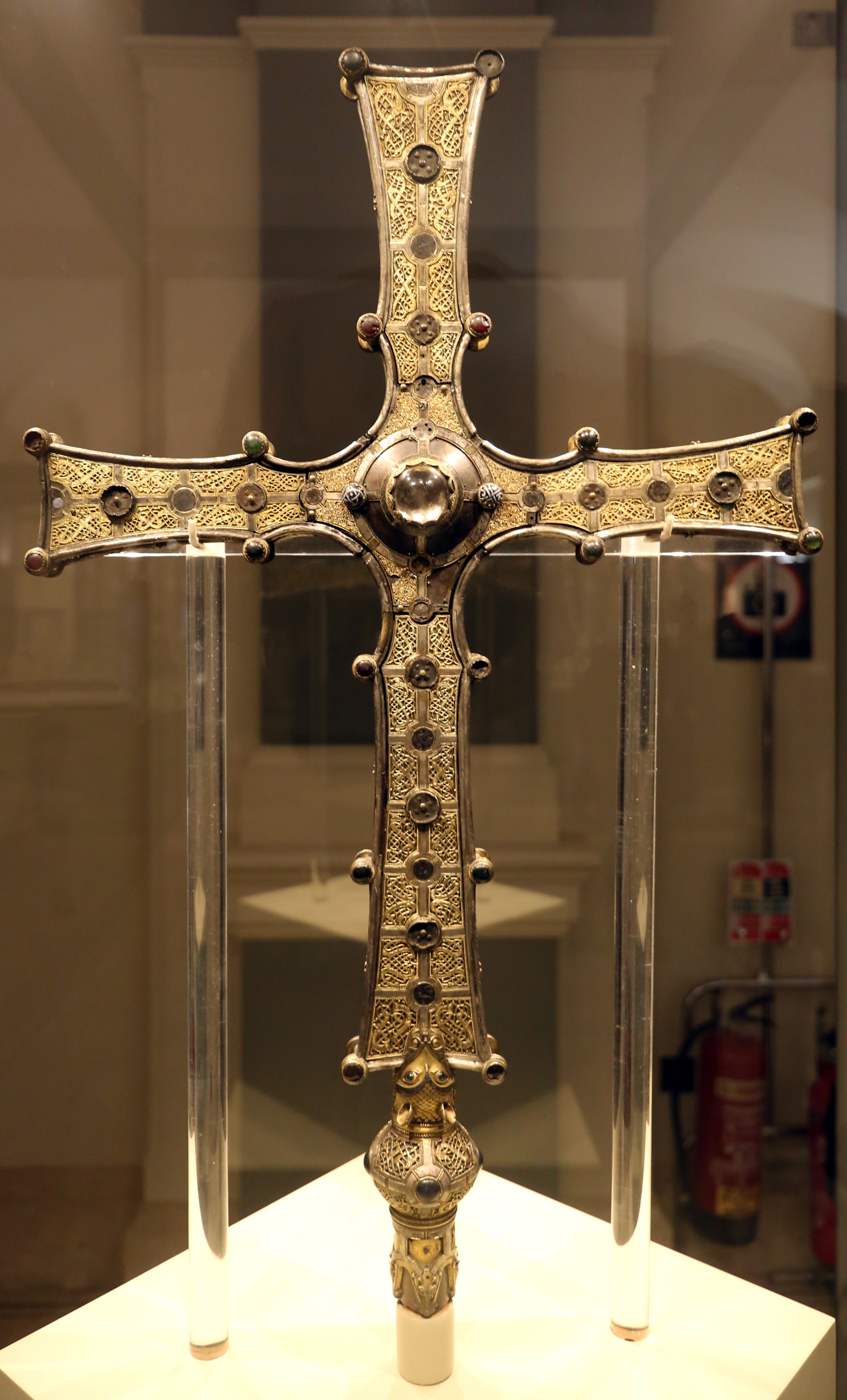
Cross of Cong

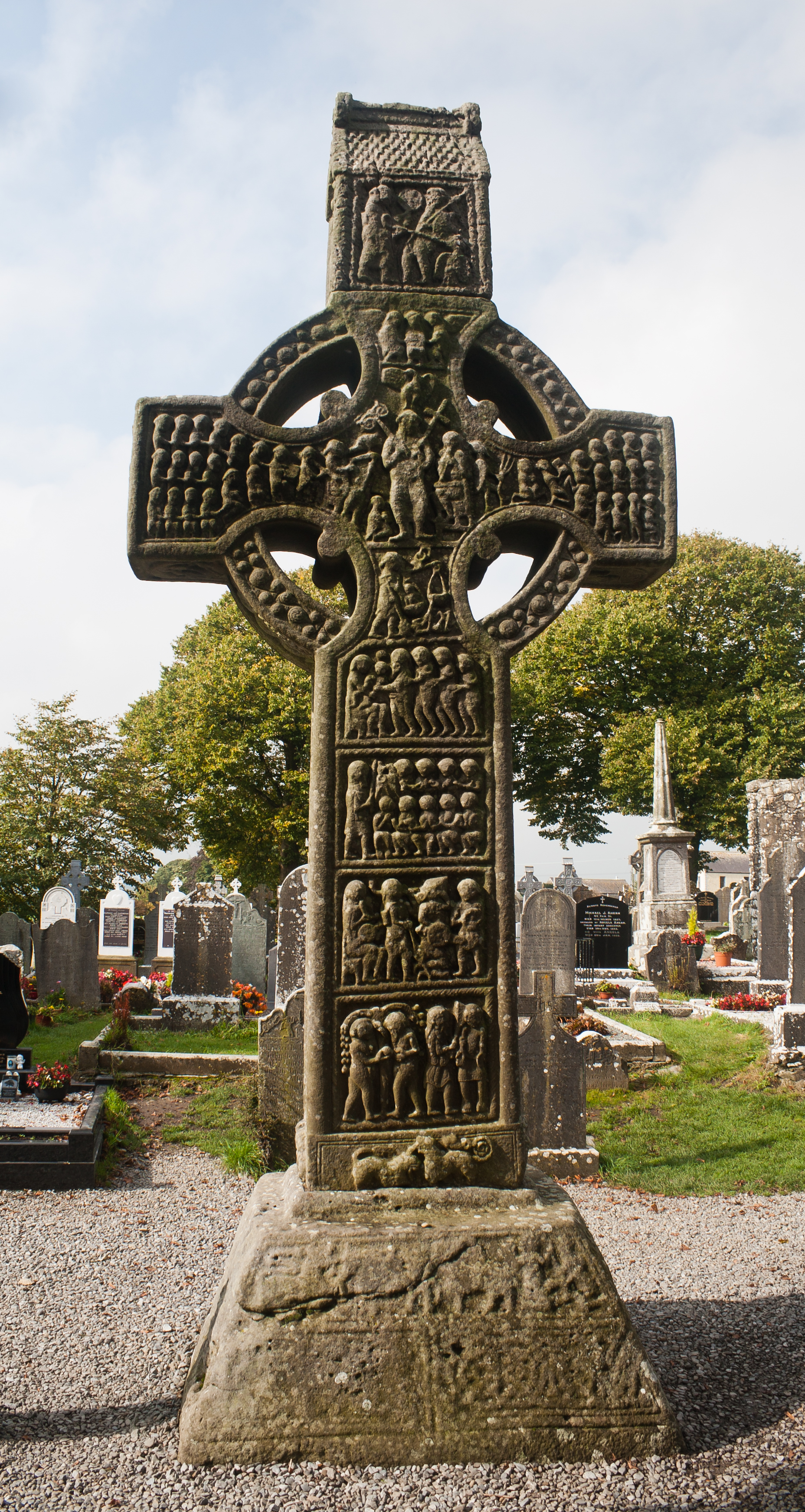
Muiredach's High Cross

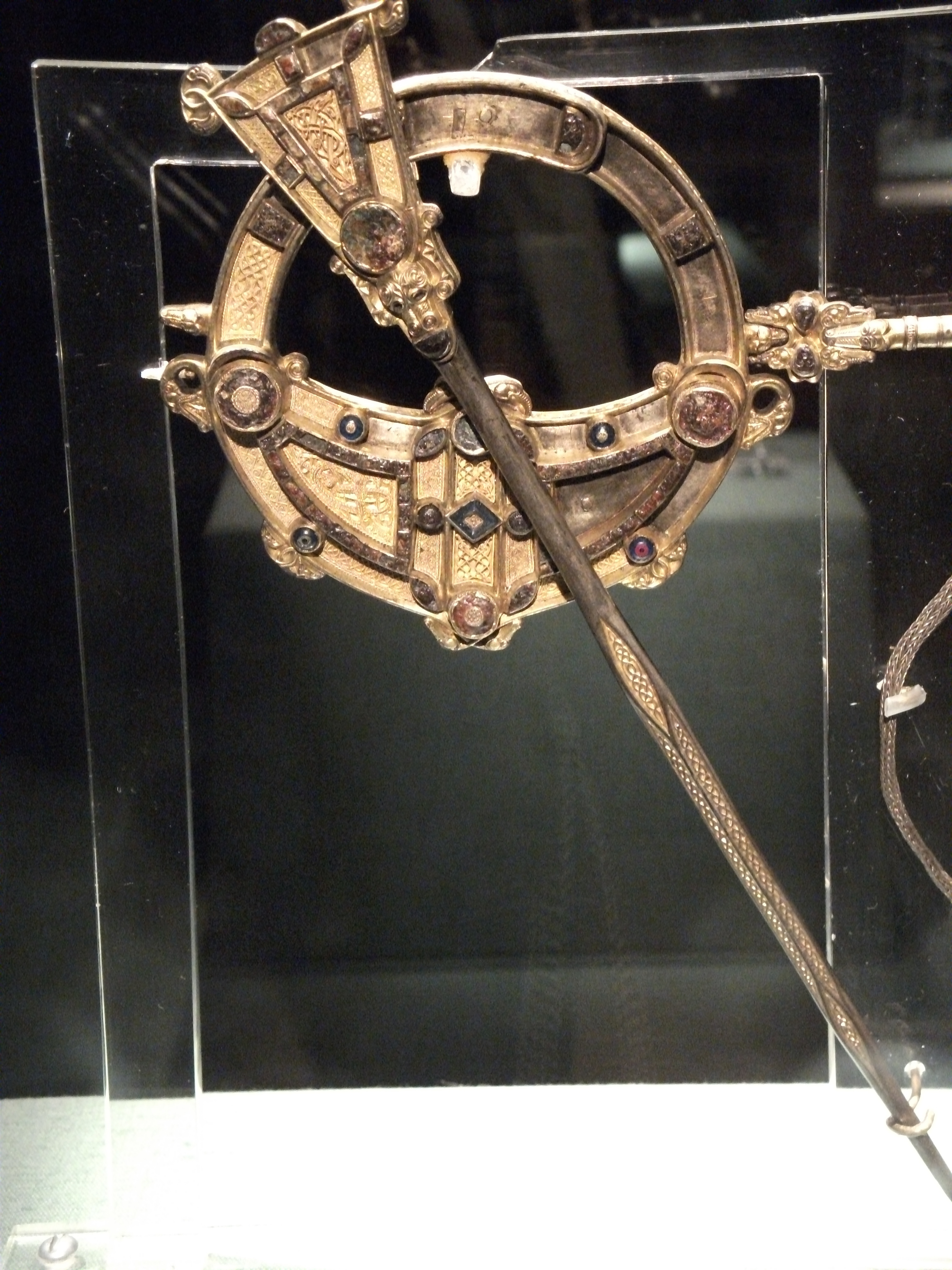
Tara Brooch

==== Music and dance ====
Although Gerald de Barri had an overtly negative view of the Irish, in Topographia Hibernica (1188) he conceded that they were more skilled at playing music than any other nation he had seen. He claimed that the two main instruments were the "harp" and "tabor" (see also bodhrán), that their music was fast and lively, and that their songs always began and ended with B-flat. In A History of Irish Music (1905), W. H. Grattan Flood wrote that there were at least ten instruments in general use by the Gaelic Irish. These were the cruit (a small harp) and clairseach (a bigger harp with typically 30 strings), the timpan (a small string instrument played with a bow or plectrum), the feadan (a fife), the buinne (an oboe or flute), the guthbuinne (a bassoon-type horn), the bennbuabhal and corn (hornpipes), the cuislenna (bagpipes – see Great Irish Warpipes), the stoc and sturgan (clarions or trumpets), and the cnamha (castanets). He also mentions the fiddle as being used in the 8th century as compliment to Irish music.

=== Assemblies ===
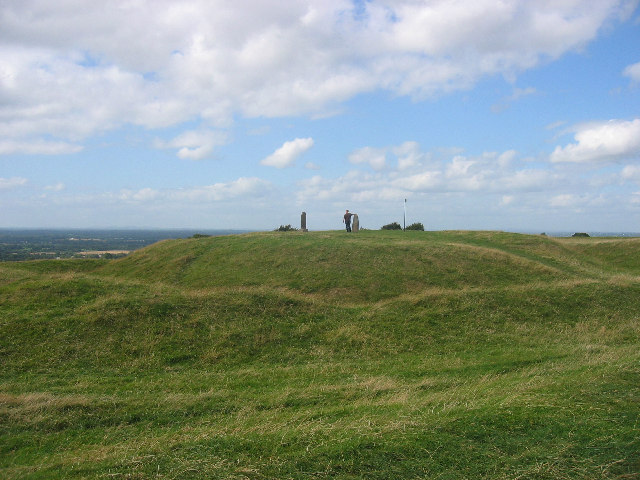
The summit of the Hill of Tara

As mentioned before, Gaelic Ireland was split into many clann territories and kingdoms called túath (plural: túatha). Although there was no central government or parliament, a number of local, regional and national gatherings were held. These combined features of assemblies and fairs.

In Ireland, the highest of these was the feis at Teamhair na Rí (Tara), which was held every third Samhain. This was a gathering of the leading men of the whole island – kings, lords, chieftains, druids, judges etc. Below this was the óenach (modern spelling: aonach). These were regional or provincial gatherings open to everyone. Examples include that held at Tailtin each Lughnasadh, and that held at Uisneach each Bealtaine. The main purpose of these gatherings was to promulgate and reaffirm the laws – they were read aloud in public that they might not be forgotten, and any changes in them carefully explained to those present.

Each túath or clann had two assemblies of its own. These were the cuirmtig, which was open to all clann members, and the dal (a term later adopted for the Irish parliament – see Dáil Éireann), which was open only to clann chiefs. Each clann had a further assembly called a tocomra, in which the clann chief (toísech, modern taoiseach) and his deputy/successor (tánaiste) were elected.

== Origins ==
Gaelic culture and the Goidelic language are first recorded in Ireland, suggesting that it first developed on the island. There is disagreement about when Ireland became Celtic. Some scholars link it to the arrival of the Bell Beaker culture in the Bronze Age, from c.2400 BC onward. This saw the arrival of people with Steppe/Yamnaya ancestry, which eventually became dominant. Archaeologist J. P. Mallory writes that the arrival of Bell Beaker culture and spread of Bell Beaker genes seems to offer "a simple and clear model" of Irish Gaelic origins, as there is no evidence of later large migrations to Ireland, archaeologically or genetically. An archaeogenetics study found that three Bronze Age men buried on Rathlin Island between 2000 and 1500 BC were most genetically similar to the modern Irish, Scots and Welsh.

Other scholars suggest that Ireland became Celtic or Goidelic much later. Linguist Peter Schrijver argues that any date before 1000 BC is too early, because the earliest Goidelic inscriptions show that it was still very similar to other Celtic languages in the 1st century AD. Schrijver says that the various Celtic language branches should have been far more divergent after two thousand years.

Mallory proposes there was a language shift sometime after 1400 BC: that Goidelic was at first spoken by a minority (perhaps a certain class), and Ireland's pre-Goidelic people gradually switched to it because it was more advantageous (easier access to goods, status, power, security etc). He suggests two "archaeological horizons" where a language shift could have happened. The first is 1400–900 BC, when many hillforts were built. Mallory suggests that a "hillfort language" would be a likely candidate for proto-Goidelic. These hillforts were hubs that probably had a range of functions, which could have fostered bilingualism and language shift. The second horizon is during the first few centuries BC, when a series of 'royal' ceremonial sites took shape (Emain Macha, Dún Ailinne, Rathcroghan, Tara) and other large enclosures and liner earthworks were built (Dorsey, Lismullin). Each of these 'royal' sites were later associated with a Gaelic tribe.

John T. Koch proposes that Goidelic developed from proto-Celtic when Ireland went through a period of relative isolation at the end of the Bronze Age and beginning of the Iron Age, from c.600 BC. He believes Ireland and Celtiberia preserved a more conservative Q-Celtic language because they were not fully integrated into La Tène culture. This emerged around 450 BC and was associated with the newer P-Celtic (Gallo-Brittonic) languages.

T. F. O'Rahilly suggested that Ireland's people had spoken a Brittonic (Brythonic) language before being conquered by Goidelic-speaking Gaels in the Iron Age. This theory has since been rejected. There is no evidence of such an invasion, and evidence suggests that Goidelic is the older branch of Celtic.

== History ==
=== Before 400 ===
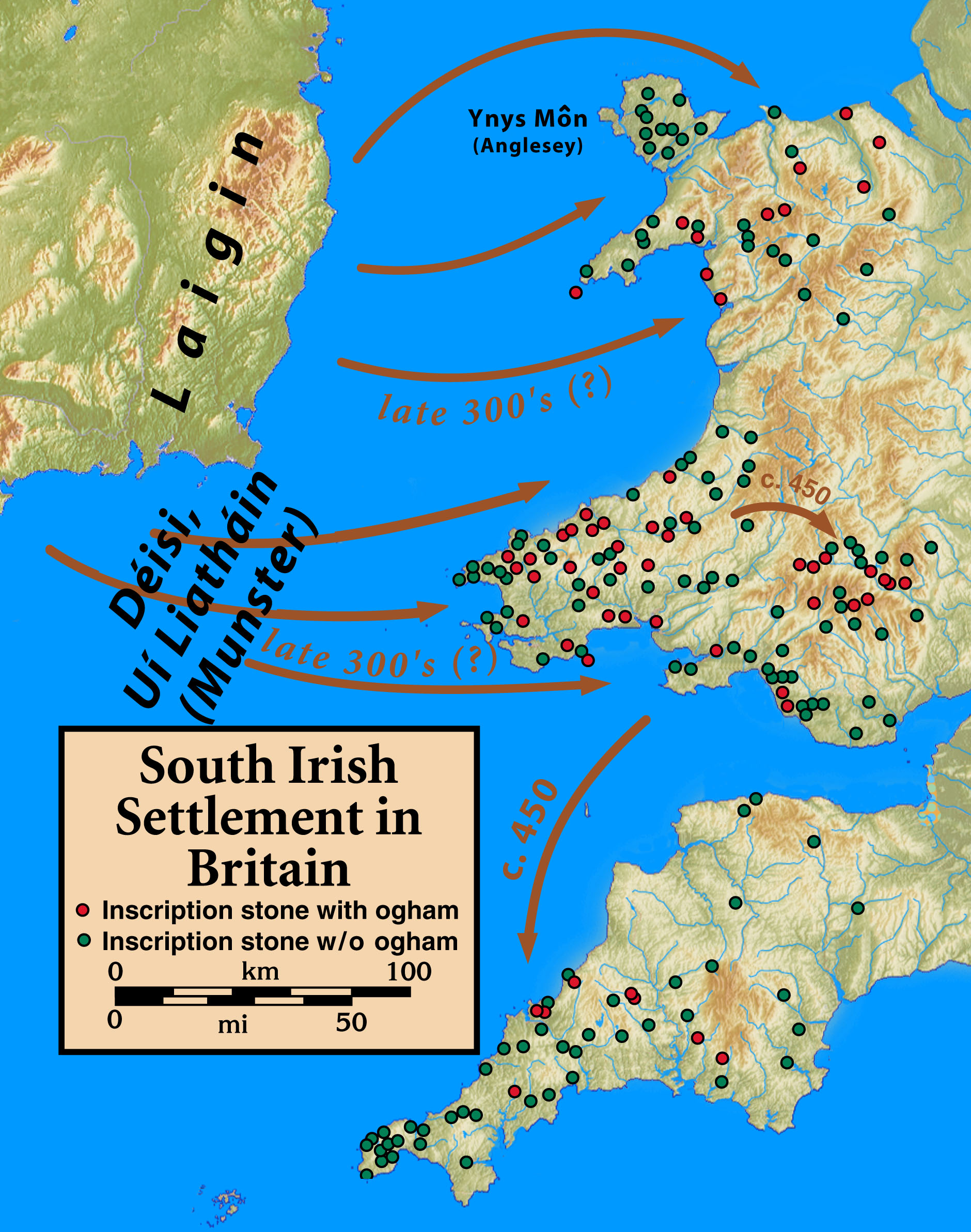
A map of the early Irish raids and colonies of Britain during and following Roman rule in Britain.

The prehistory of Ireland included a protohistorical period, when the literate cultures of Greece and Rome first began to take notice of the Irish, and a further proto-literate period of ogham epigraphy, before the early historical period began in the early 5th century.

During this period, the Gaels traded with the Roman Empire and also raided and colonized Britain during the end of Roman rule in Britain. The Romans of this era called these Gaelic raiders Scoti and their homeland Hibernia or Scotia. Scoti was a Latin name that first referred to all of the Gaels, whether in Ireland or Great Britain, but later came to refer only to the Gaels in northern Britain. As time went on, the Gaels began intensifying their raids and colonies in Roman Britain (c. 200–500 AD).

For much of this period, the island of Ireland was divided into numerous clan territories and kingdoms (known as túatha).

=== 400 to 800 ===
The early medieval history of Ireland, often called Early Christian Ireland, spans the 5th to 8th centuries, from a gradual emergence out of the protohistoric period (Ogham inscriptions in Primitive Irish, negative mentions in Greco-Roman ethnography) to the beginning of the Viking Age.

The introduction of Christianity to Ireland dates to sometime before the 5th century. With Palladius the eventual first Bishop of Ireland being sent during this period (mid-5th century) by Pope Celestine I to preach "ad Scotti in Christum" or in other words to minister to the Scoti or Irish "believing in Christ". Early medieval traditions credit Saint Patrick as being the first Primate of Ireland.

The Gaelic Kingdom of Dál Riata is said to have been founded in the 5th century by the legendary king Fergus Mór mac Eirc or Fergus Mór in Argyll or "the coast of the Gaels" located in modern-day Scotland. The Dál Riata had a strong seafaring culture and a large naval fleet.

From the 5th century on, clerics of Christianised Ireland such as Brigid of Kildare, Saint MacCul, Saint Moluag, Saint Caillín, Columbanus as well as the Twelve Apostles of Ireland: Saint Ciarán of Saighir, Saint Ciarán of Clonmacnoise, Saint Brendan of Birr, Saint Brendan of Clonfert, Saint Columba of Terryglass, Saint Columba, Saint Mobhí, Saint Ruadhán of Lorrha, Saint Seanán, Saint Ninnidh, Saint Laisrén mac Nad Froích and Saint Canice were active in ministry in Ireland and as missionaries throughout Europe in Gaul, the Isle of Mann, in Scotland, in the Anglo-Saxon Kingdoms of England and in the Frankish Empire thus spreading Gaelic cultural influence to Continental Europe and even as far away as Iceland.

By the 8th century, the King of the Picts, Óengus mac Fergusso or Angus I expanded the influence of his kingdom using conquest, subjugation and diplomacy over the Gaels of Dal Riata, the Britons of Strathclyde and the Anglo-Saxons of Northumbria.

During this period, in addition to kingdoms or túatha, the 5 main over-kingdoms begin to form. (Old Irish cóiceda, Modern Irish cúige). These were Ulaid (in the north), Connacht (in the west), Laighin (in the southeast), Mumhan (in the south) and Mide (in the centre).

=== 800 to 1169 ===
The history of Ireland 800–1169 covers the period in the history of Ireland from the first Viking raids to the Norman invasion.

Beginning in 795, small bands of Vikings began plundering monastic settlements along the coast of Ireland. By 853, Viking leader Amlaíb had become the first king of Dublin. He ruled along with his brothers Ímar and Auisle. His dynasty, the Uí Ímair ruled over the following decades. During this period there was regular warfare between the Vikings and the Irish, and between two separate groups of Norse from Lochlann: the Dubgaill and Finngaill (meaning dark and fair foreigners). Norse settlements were established at Dublin, Wexford, Waterford, Cork and Limerick, which became the first large towns in Ireland.

In the mid-9th century, the crowns of both the Gaelic Dál Riata and the Celtic Pictish Kingdom were combined under the rule of one person, Cináid Mac Ailpin or Kenneth McAlpin. Kenneth became the first High King of Alba. Combining the territories of both kingdoms to form a new Gaelic over-kingdom in Northern Britain, the Kingdom of Alba, which comprises most of what is now modern-day Scotland.

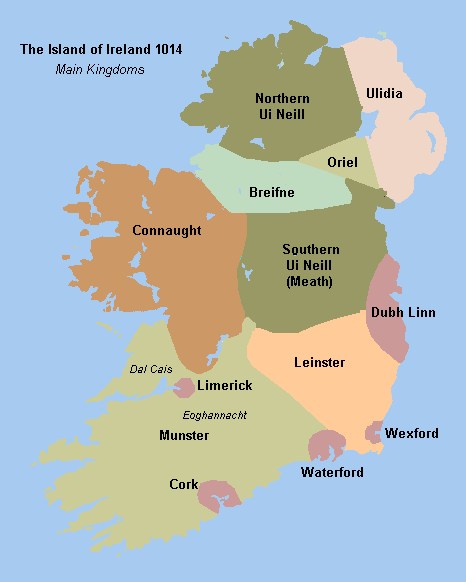
Ireland in 1014 showing the Island as a "patchwork" of various Gaelic Kingdoms: Ulaid, Airgíalla, Mide, Laigin, Munster, Connacht, Breifne and Aileach. Missing are kingdoms of Osraighe and Uí Maine. Norse settlements shown in red.

Gaelic Ireland of this era still consisted of the many semi-independent territories called (túatha), however there was a nominal Kingship of the Island. The King was more of a cultural leader and held soft power over the sub Kings who would submit to him, this was akin to later Feudal Kingship but with a lower degree of control and far more devolved power in the hands of sub-Kings who were still rulers in their own right. Viking Kings of Dublin and elsewhere at times, would often recognise the High King as their overlord. Traditionally the King would have come from the Ui Neill Clan who held power in sub-Kingdoms of Aillech (Now part of Ulster), and Midhe (the lost Fifth Province, now part of Leinster). For a large percentage of this period, this was mainly displayed through a rivalry between High Kings of Ireland from the Northern and Southern branches of the Uí Néill. The one who came closest to being de facto king over the whole of Ireland, however, was Brian Bóruma, the first high king in this period not belonging to the Uí Néill.

Through military might, Brian went about building a Gaelic Imperium under his High Kingship as "Imperator Scottorum," or "Emperor of the Gaels", even gaining the submission of Máel Sechnaill mac Domnaill, his long time rival and a previous High King of Ireland himself. Both Brian and Máel Sechnaill were involved in several battles against the Vikings and each other: the Battle of Tara, the Battle of Glenmama and finally the Battle of Clontarf in 1014. The last of which saw Brian's demise. Brian's campaign is glorified in the Cogad Gáedel re Gallaib ("The War of the Gaels with the Foreigners").

Following Brian's death, the political situation became more complex with rivalry for high kingship from several clans and dynasties. Brian's descendants failed to maintain a unified throne, and regional squabbling over territory led indirectly to the invasion of the Normans under Richard de Clare (Strongbow) in 1169.

=== Anglo-Normans in Ireland ===
==== Invasion ====
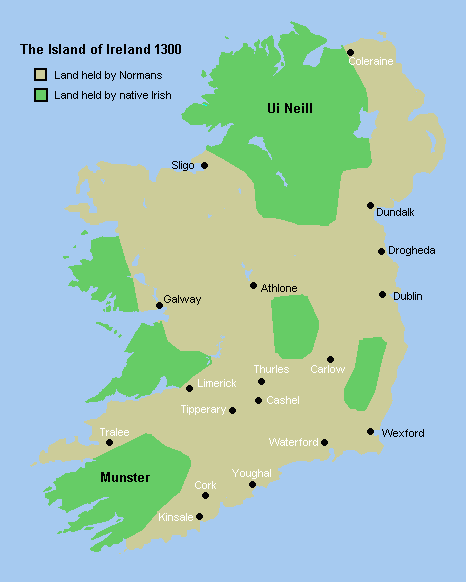
Ireland in 1300 showing lands held by native Irish (green) and lands held by Normans (pale).

Ireland became Christianized between the 5th and 7th centuries. Pope Adrian IV, the only English pope, had already issued a Papal Bull in 1155 giving Henry II of England authority to invade Ireland as a means of curbing Irish refusal to recognize Roman law. Importantly, for later English monarchs, the Bull, Laudabiliter, maintained papal suzerainty over the island:

There is indeed no doubt, as thy Highness doth also acknowledge, that Ireland and all other islands which Christ the Sun of Righteousness has illumined, and which have received the doctrines of the Christian faith, belong to the jurisdiction of St. Peter and of the holy Roman Church.

In 1166, after losing the protection of High King Muirchertach Mac Lochlainn, King Diarmait Mac Murchada of Leinster was forcibly exiled by a confederation of Irish forces under King Ruaidri mac Tairrdelbach Ua Conchobair. Fleeing first to Bristol and then to Normandy, Diarmait obtained permission from Henry II of England to use his subjects to regain his kingdom. By the following year, he had obtained these services and in 1169 the main body of Norman, Welsh and Flemish forces landed in Ireland and quickly retook Leinster and the cities of Waterford and Dublin on behalf of Diarmait. The leader of the Norman force, Richard de Clare, 2nd Earl of Pembroke, more commonly known as Strongbow, married Diarmait's daughter, Aoife, and was named tánaiste to the Kingdom of Leinster. This caused consternation to Henry II, who feared the establishment of a rival Norman state in Ireland. Accordingly, he resolved to visit Leinster to establish his authority.

Henry landed in 1171, proclaiming Waterford and Dublin as Royal Cities. Adrian's successor, Pope Alexander III, ratified the grant of Ireland to Henry in 1172. The 1175 Treaty of Windsor between Henry and Ruaidhrí maintained Ruaidhrí as High King of Ireland but codified Henry's control of Leinster, Meath and Waterford. However, with Diarmuid and Strongbow dead, Henry back in England, and Ruaidhrí unable to curb his vassals, the high kingship rapidly lost control of the country. Henry, in 1185, awarded his younger son, John, the title Dominus Hiberniae or "Lord of Ireland" at the Council of Oxford. This kept the newly created title, the Lordship of Ireland and the Kingdom of England personally and legally separate. During the same year, 1185, Prince John made his first expedition to Ireland. However, when John unexpectedly succeeded his brother as King of England in 1199, the Lordship of Ireland fell back into personal union with the Kingdom of England, securing its place within the greater Angevin Empire. In the legal terminology of John's successors, the "lordship of Ireland" referred to the sovereignty vested in the Crown of England; the corresponding territory was referred to as the "land of Ireland".

==== Gaelic resurgence ====
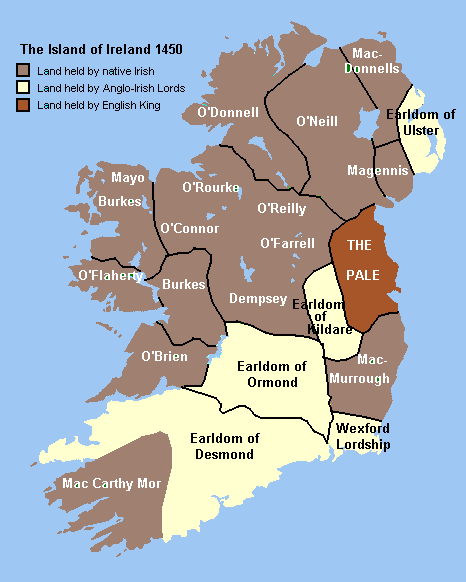
Ireland in 1450 showing lands held by native Irish (green), the Anglo-Irish (blue) and the English king (dark grey).

By 1261, the weakening of the Anglo-Norman Lordship had become manifest following a string of military defeats. In the chaotic situation, local Irish lords won back large amounts of land. The invasion by Edward Bruce in 1315–18 at a time of great famine weakened the Norman economy. The Black Death arrived in Ireland in 1348. Because most of the English and Norman inhabitants of Ireland lived in towns and villages, the plague hit them far harder than it did the native Irish, who lived in more dispersed rural settlements. After it had passed, Gaelic Irish language and customs came to dominate the country again. The English-controlled area shrank back to the Pale, a fortified area around Dublin. Outside the Pale, the Hiberno-Norman lords intermarried with Gaelic noble families, adopted the Irish language and customs and sided with the Gaelic Irish in political and military conflicts against the Lordship. They became known as the Old English, and in the words of a contemporary English commentator, were "more Irish than the Irish themselves."

The authorities in the Pale worried about the Gaelicisation of Norman Ireland, and passed the Statutes of Kilkenny in 1366 banning those of English descent from speaking the Irish language, wearing Irish clothes or inter-marrying with the Irish. The government in Dublin had little real authority. By the end of the 15th century, central English authority in Ireland had all but disappeared. England's attentions were diverted by the Hundred Years' War (1337–1453) and then by the Wars of the Roses (1450–85). Around the country, local Gaelic and Gaelicised lords expanded their powers at the expense of the English government in Dublin. Whereas tributes like coyne and livery were exacted by chiefs within their own domains, "black rent" was protection payment in kind, typically as cattle, paid by those in neighbouring areas to avoid being raided.

==== Gaelic kingdoms during the period ====
Following the failed attempt by the Scottish King Edward Bruce (see Irish Bruce Wars 1315–1318) to drive the Normans out of Ireland, there emerged a number of important Gaelic kingdoms and Gaelic-controlled lordships.

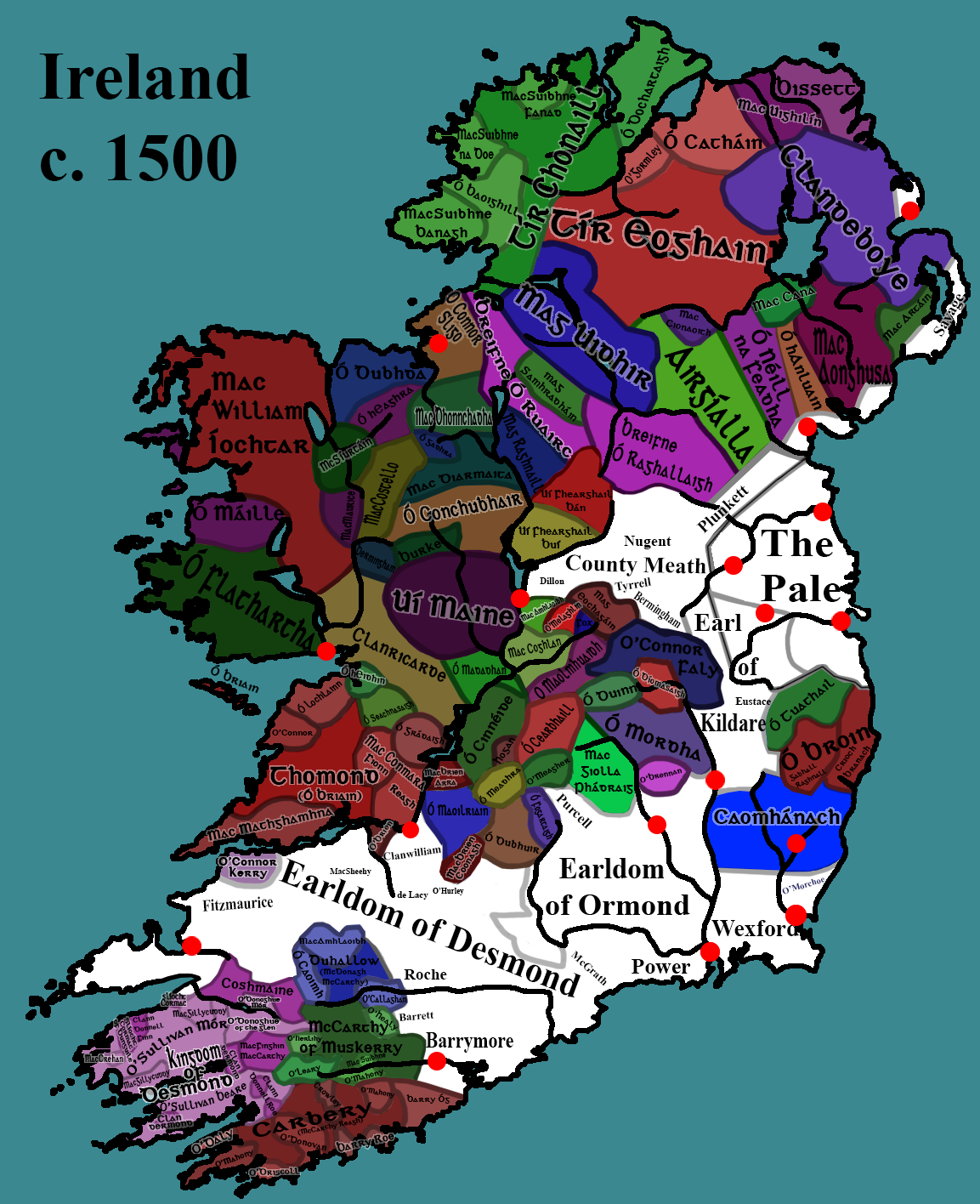
Tudor Ireland c. 1500, Map of Ireland showing the approximate territories of the various Gaelic Kingdoms and Anglo-Norman Lordships.

- Connacht: The Connachta and ruling Ó Conchobhair dynasty, despite their setback during the Bruce wars, had regrouped and ensured that the title King of Connacht was not yet an empty one. Their stronghold was in their homeland of Sil Muirdeag, from where they dominated much of northern and northeastern Connacht. However, after the death of Ruaidri mac Tairdelbach Ua Conchobair in 1384, the dynasty split into two factions, Ó Conchobhair Don and Ó Conchobhair Ruadh. By the late 15th century, internecine warfare between the two branches had weakened them to the point where they themselves became vassals of more powerful lords such as Ó Domhnaill of Tír Chonaill and the Clan Burke of Clanricarde. The Mac Diarmata Kings of Moylurg retained their status and kingdom during this era, up to the death of Tadhg Mac Diarmata in 1585 (last de facto King of Moylurg). Their cousins, the Mac Donnacha of Tír Ailella, found their fortunes bound to the Ó Conchobhair Ruadh. The kingdom of Uí Maine had lost much of its southern and western lands to the Clanricardes, but managed to flourish until repeated raids by Ó Domhnaill in the early 16th century weakened it. Other territories such as Ó Flaithbeheraigh of Iar Connacht, Ó Seachnasaigh of Aidhne, O'Dowd of Tireagh, Ó hEaghra, Ó Gadhra and Ó Maddan, either survived in isolation or were vassals for greater men.
- Ulster: The Ulaid proper were in a sorry state all during this era, being squeezed between the emergent Ó Neill of Tír Eógain in the west, the MacDonnells, Clann Aodha Buidhe, and the Anglo-Normans from the east. Only Mag Aonghusa managed to retain a portion of their former kingdom with expansion into Iveagh. The two great success stories of this era were Ó Domhnaill of Tír Chonaill and Ó Neill of Tír Eógain. Ó Domhnaill was able to dominate much of northern Connacht to the detriment of its native lords, both Old English and Gaelic, though it took time to suborn the likes of Ó Conchobhair Sligigh and Ó Raghallaigh of Iar Breifne. Expansion southwards brought the hegemony of Tír Eógain, and by extension Ó Neill influence, well into the border lordships of Louth and Meath. Mag Uidir of Fear Manach would slightly later be able to build his lordship up to that of third most powerful in the province, at the expense of the Ó Raghallaigh of Iar Breifne and the MacMahons of Airgíalla.
- Leinster: Likewise, despite the adverse (and unforeseen) effects of Diarmait Mac Murchada's efforts to regain his kingdom, the fact of the matter was that, of his twenty successors up to 1632, most of them had regained much of the ground they had lost to the Normans, and exacted yearly tribute from the towns. His most dynamic successor was the celebrated Art mac Art MacMurrough-Kavanagh. The Ó Broin and Ó Tuathail largely contented themselves with raids on Dublin (which, incredibly, continued into the 18th century). The Ó Mordha of Laois and Ó Conchobhair Falaighe of Offaly – the latter's capital was Daingean – were two self-contained territories that had earned the right to be called kingdoms due to their near-invincibility against successive generations of Anglo-Irish. The great losers were the Ó Melaghlins of Meath: their kingdom collapsed despite attempts by Cormac mac Art O Melaghlain to restore it. The royal family was reduced to vassal status, confined to the east shores of the River Shannon. The kingdom was substantially incorporated into the Lordship of Meath which was granted to Hugh de Lacy in 1172.
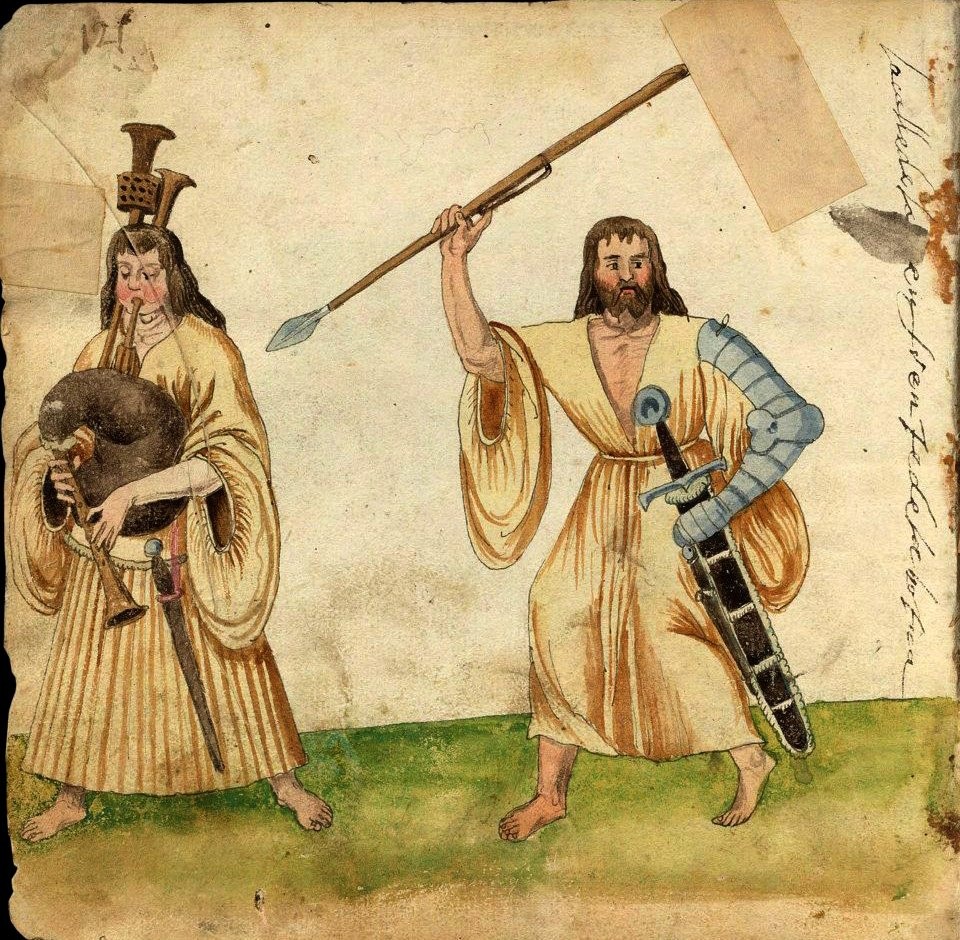
  Irish Gaels, c. 1529
- Munster:
  - Desmond: Following the Norman invasion of Ireland in the late 12th century, the eastern half of Desmond was conquered by the Anglo-Normans and became the Earldom of Desmond, ruled by the Fitzmaurices and FitzGeralds— the famous Irish family known as the Geraldines. The king of Desmond, Diarmaid Mac Cárthaigh submitted to Henry II of England, but the western half of Desmond lived on as a semi-independent Gaelic kingdom. It was often at war with the Anglo-Normans. Fínghin Mac Carthaigh's victory over the Anglo-Normans at the Battle of Callann (1261) helped preserve Desmond's independence. The kings of Desmond founded sites such as Blarney Castle, Ballycarbery Castle, Muckross Abbey and Kilcrea Friary. Following the Nine Years' War of the 1590s, Desmond became part of the Kingdom of Ireland. See Kingdom of Desmond, Barony of Carbery, Battle of Callann
  - Thomond: Despite huge setbacks, the descendants of Brian Bóruma had, by surviving the Second Battle of Athenry and winning the decisive battles of Corcomroe and Dysert O'Dea, been able to suborn their vassals and eradicate the Normans from their home kingdom of Thomond. Their spheres of interest often met with conflict with Anglo-Normans such as the Earls of Desmond and Earls of Ormond, yet they ruled right up to the end of Gaelic Ireland, and beyond, by expedient of becoming the O'Brien Earls of Thomond.

=== Tudor conquest and aftermath ===
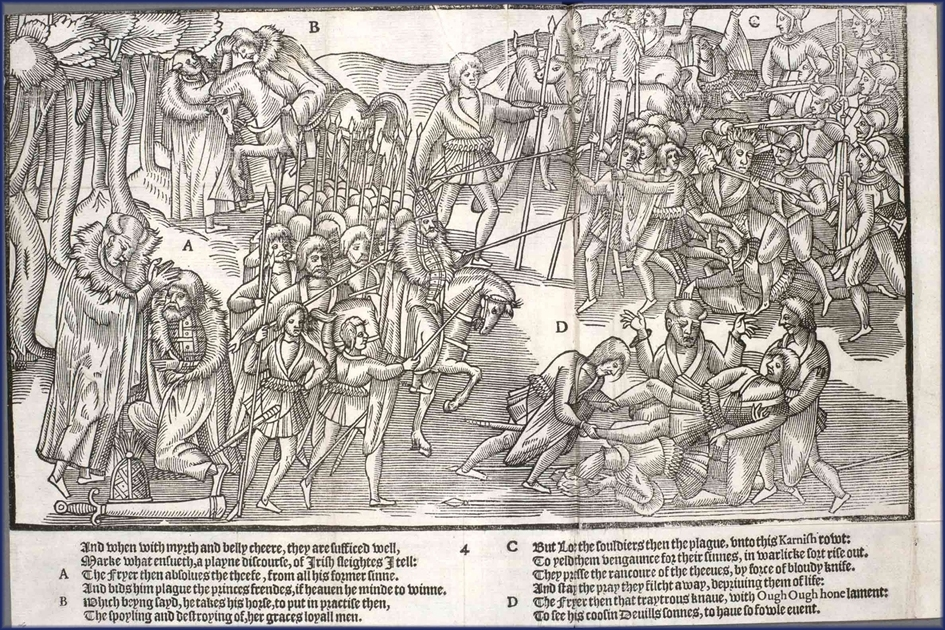
The Irish Gaelic chieftain receives the priest's blessing before departing to fight the English, who are shown in full armour, from The Image of Irelande, 1581

From 1536, Henry VIII of England decided to conquer Ireland and bring it under English control. The FitzGerald dynasty of Kildare, who had become the effective rulers of the Lordship of Ireland (The Pale) in the 15th century, had become unreliable allies and Henry resolved to bring Ireland under English government control so the island would not become a base for future rebellions or foreign invasions of England. To involve the Gaelic nobility and allow them to retain their lands under English law the policy of surrender and regrant was applied.

In 1541, Henry upgraded Ireland from a lordship to a full kingdom with the Crown of Ireland Act 1542, partly in response to changing relationships with the papacy, which still had suzerainty over Ireland, following Henry's break with the church. Henry was proclaimed King of Ireland at a meeting of the Irish Parliament that year. This was the first meeting of the Irish Parliament to be attended by the Gaelic Irish princes as well as the Hiberno-Norman aristocracy.

With the technical institutions of government in place, the next step was to extend the control of the Kingdom of Ireland over all of its claimed territory. This took nearly a century, with various English administrations in the process either negotiating or fighting with the independent Irish and Old English lords. The conquest was completed during the reigns of Elizabeth and James I, after several bloody conflicts including the suppression of the Desmond, Tyrone and Inishowen rebellions. The defeat of the Gaelic nobility at the Siege of Kinsale in 1601 and final suppression of the various rebellions in Ulster by 1608 marked the end of the conquest. The war ended in defeat for the Irish Gaelic alliance, and its aftermath brought an end to the independence of the last Irish Gaelic kingdoms.

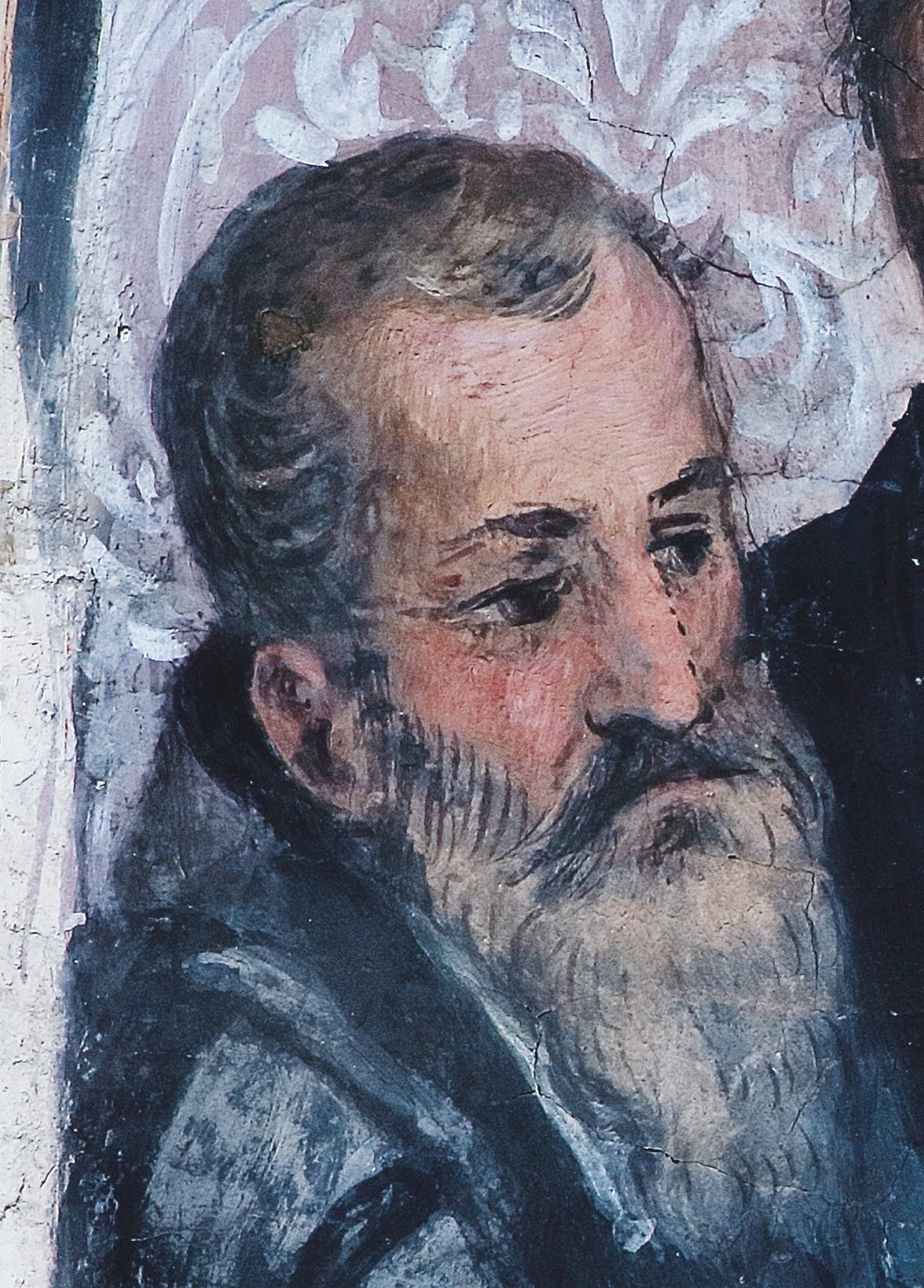
Hugh O'Neill, Earl of Tyrone, led a confederacy of Irish lords against the Tudor government in the Nine Years' War (1593–1603).

In 1603, with the Union of the Crowns, King James of Scotland also became King of England and Ireland. James saw the Gaels as a barbarous and rebellious people in need of civilizing and believed that Gaelic culture should be wiped out. James started official policies of Anglicisation in order to convert the Gaelic nobility of Ireland to that of a Late Feudal model based upon English Law. He also set about colonising the land of the defeated rebel lords with English-speaking Protestant settlers from Britain, in what became known as the Plantation of Ulster. It was meant to establish a loyal British Protestant colony in Ireland's most rebellious region and to sever Gaelic Ireland's historical and cultural links with Gaelic Scotland.

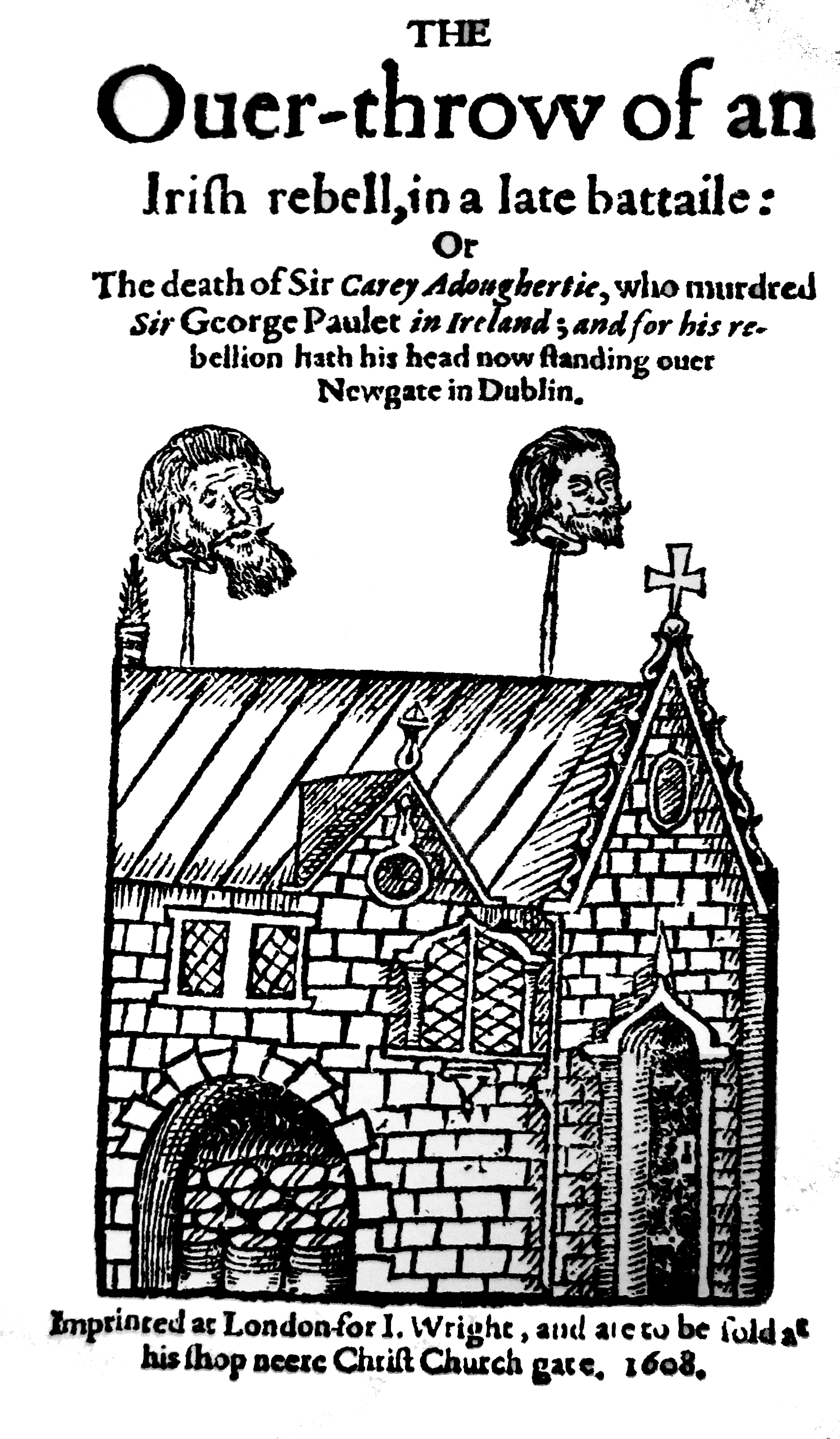
Newgate, Dublin. 1608. Displaying the heads of Gaelic Irish rebels Cahir O'Doherty (right) and Phelim Reagh MacDaibhéid (left).

The Flight of the Earls in 1607 is seen as a watershed moment for Gaelic Ireland. The flight of both Earl O'Neill of Tyrone and Earl O'Donnell of Tyrconnell into exile marked the destruction of the Ireland's independent nobility. This and the aftermath of the Tudor conquest had cleared the way for the Plantation of Ulster. After this point, the English authorities in Dublin established greater control over Ireland, establishing – or, at least, attempting to establish – a centralised government for the entire island, and successfully disarmed the Gaelic lordships. Hugh Red O'Donnell died in Simancas, Valladolid, in September 1602, when petitioning Philip III of Spain for further assistance. His brother, Rory O'Donnell, succeeded him as the 1st Earl of Tyrconnell. Hugh O'Neill died in exile in Rome on 20 July 1616. Upon news of his death, the court poets of Ireland engaged in the contention of the bards.

Hugh's son, Shane O'Neill was active in armies fighting for Madrid in the Low Countries and Spain. He died in Spanish Service near Barcelona at the Battle of Montjuïc in 1641, fighting against the Kingdom of France. During the Irish Confederate Wars in 1641, many of these Gaelic exiles returned to fight for their home, including one of O'Neill's nephews, Owen. Owen Roe O'Neill was deeply opposed to British rule and returned home from exile in distinguished Spanish service. These Gaelic exiles brought with them invaluable knowledge of modern military tactics including push of pike warfare and Anti-Siege expertise. This knowledge was used to devastating effect by Owen and fellow O'Neill clan members Hugh and Felim during different stages of these conflicts at the Battle of Benburb, the Siege of Clonmel and the Siege of Charlemont respectively.

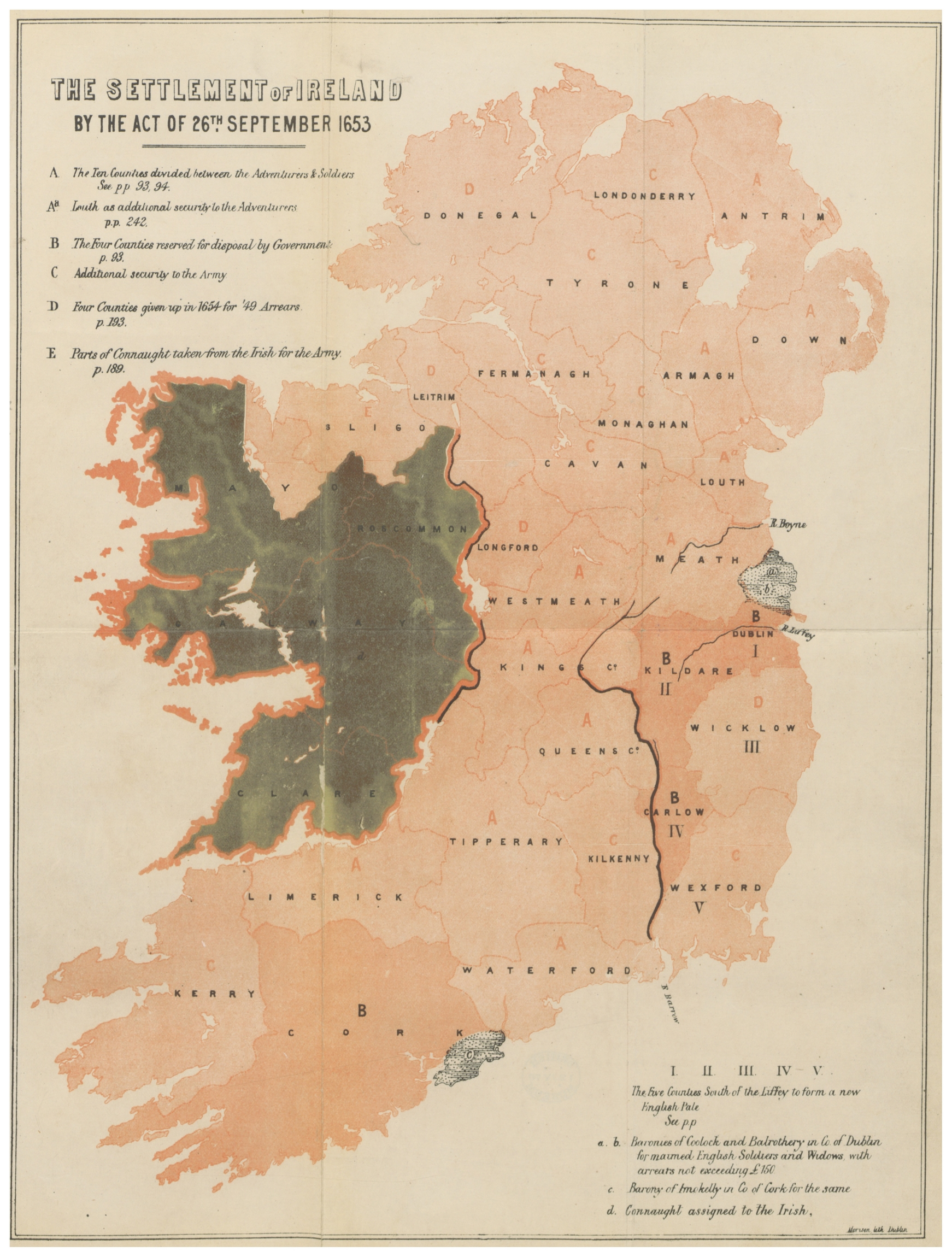
After Cromwell's victory, huge areas of land were confiscated from the Gaelic nobility and the Irish Catholics were banished to the lands of Connacht. The Commonwealth is said to have declared that all the Catholic Irish must go "to Hell or to Connaught".

The outright invasion and conquest by England's New Model Army under Oliver Cromwell and the "free-fire" zones and scorched earth tactics they used in the later stages of Wars of the Three Kingdoms marked a turning point. The plague, famine, oppressive Cromwellian Settlements, plantation that followed and deliberate refugee crisis in the West of Ireland further suppressed the local Gaelic populace. The Glorious Revolution of William and Mary in England and corresponding Williamite War in Ireland further negatively affected the local Gaels. The last vestiges of Gaelic Ireland and its ancient nobility were completely wiped away following the Jacobite defeats at the Battle of the Boyne and Battle of Aughrim. The period that followed saw the Protestant Ascendancy in Ireland and the passage of repressive Anti-Catholic laws.

England and Scotland merged politically in 1707 after the crowns of both countries were united in 1603, but the crown of Ireland did not merge with the Union until 1800. Part of the attraction of the Union for many Irish Catholics was the promise of Catholic Emancipation, allowing Roman Catholic MPs, who had not been allowed in the Irish Parliament. This was however blocked by King George III who argued that emancipating Roman Catholics would breach his Coronation Oath, and was not realised until 1829.

The Gaelic roots that defined early Irish history still persist to this day, despite the Anglicisation of Irish culture and politics. Christianity became a prominent expression of Irish identity in Ireland. In the time leading up to the Great Famine of the 1840s, many priests believed that parishioner spirituality was paramount, resulting in a localized morphing of Gaelic and Catholic traditions.

=== Modern ===
The Gaelic revival was the late-nineteenth-century national revival of interest in the Irish language (also known as Gaeilge) and Gaelic culture (including folklore, sports, music, arts, etc.) and was an associated part of a greater Celtic cultural revivals in Scotland, Brittany, Cornwall, Continental Europe and among the Celtic Diaspora communities: Irish, Scottish, Breton, Cornish and Welsh. With organizations in Ireland such as Conradh na Gaeilge and An Comunn Gàidhealach attempting to restore the prestige of Gaelic culture and the socio-communal hegemony of the Gaelic languages. Many of the participants in the Irish Revolution of 1912–1923 were inspired by these ideals and so when a sovereign state was formed in Ireland, post-colonial enthusiasm for the re-Gaelicisation of Ireland was high and promoted through public education. Results were very mixed however and the Gaeltacht where native speakers lived continued to retract. In the 1960s and 70s, pressure from groups such as Misneach (supported by Máirtín Ó Cadhain), the Gluaiseacht Chearta Siabhialta na Gaeltachta and others; particularly in Connemara; paved the way for the creation of development agencies such as Údarás na Gaeltachta and state television and radio in Irish.

== Genetic legacy ==
A 2017 genetic study, the "Irish DNA Atlas", shows that the Irish population can be divided into ten geographic genetic clusters; seven of Gaelic Irish ancestry, and three of shared Irish-British ancestry. The differences between the Gaelic clusters are small, and are "surprisingly faithful to the historical boundaries of Irish provinces and kingdoms". These clusters are "Ulster" in the northwest, "Connacht" in the west and midlands (corresponding to the historical kingdom of Connacht and Bréifne), "North Munster" (corresponding to historical Thomond), "South Munster" (corresponding to historical Desmond), "Leinster" (corresponding to the historical kingdom), "Central Ireland", and "Dublin". The Gaelic "Ulster" cluster shows the biggest genetic distance from Britain; this was the region that remained outside English control for the longest. The study also showed that a cluster in Argyll in western Scotland is genetically closer to the Gaelic Irish clusters than the other Scottish clusters. This area was historically part of the Gaelic kingdom of Dál Riata.

The genetic Haplogroup R-L21 is dominant among Irish males of Gaelic ancestry. Developments in genetic genealogy have allowed geneticists to link genetic subclades with specific Irish Gaelic kindred groups and their surnames. For example, the Uí Néill (O'Neill, O'Donnell, Gallagher, etc.), are associated with R-M222 and the Dál gCais (O'Brien, McMahon, Kennedy, etc.) are associated with R-L226.

== Notable Irish kings ==
- List of kings
- List of High kings

== See also ==
- Gaels
- Goidelic languages
- Irish Language (Gaeilge)
- Scottish Gaelic Language (Gàidhlig)
- Scottish Gaelic Culture
- Gaelic warfare
