= Protohistory of Ireland =

The prehistory of Ireland included a protohistorical period, when the literate cultures of Greece and Rome began to take notice of it, and a further proto-literate period of ogham epigraphy, before the early historical period began in the 5th century. Attempts have been made to reconstruct the political developments of this period by reference to early medieval Irish genealogical texts.

== Ireland in Classical literature ==
=== Early references ===
Classical writers occasionally refer to Ireland under a variety of names, but these references contain little reliable information.

In the Ora Maritima, Roman writer Avienius refers to a "sacred isle" (insula sacra) and says that it is inhabited by the gens Hiernorum (the Hierni, or the Irish). Though the text dates to the 4th century AD, he was using much older sources, and this part is widely agreed to be based on the Massaliote Periplus from the 4th–6th century BC.

Julius Caesar, in his Commentarii de Bello Gallico, written in the 1st century BC, is the first to call the island Hibernia. He says it as about half the size of Britain, and correctly places it to the west of Britain.

Diodorus Siculus, writing in the 1st century BC, claims that the Prettanoi of the island of Iris are cannibals. Strabo calls the island Ierné around AD 19. He repeats the accusation, adding that they consider it honourable to eat their dead fathers, and openly have sex with their mothers and sisters (although he is skeptical about his sources).

Pomponius Mela calls it Iuverna and says that, although the climate is unfavourable for grain, grass grows so richly that cattle burst if unrestrained from eating it..

=== Tacitus ===
Tacitus says that his father-in-law Gnaeus Julius Agricola, while governor of Britain (AD 78–85), considered conquering Ireland, believing it could be held with one legion plus auxiliaries, and entertained an exiled Irish petty king with the intention of making him the pretext for conquest. Parallels have been drawn with the Irish legend of Túathal Techtmar, who is said to have been exiled to Britain as a child and returned with an army to claim the kingship of Tara in the 1st century. Tacitus also says that most of the harbours and approaches to Ireland were known through commerce, but inaccurately locates the island between Britain and the Iberian Peninsula.

=== Juvenal ===
The 2nd-century poet Juvenal, in his second Satire, contrasting the victories of the Roman army with the low morals of the people at home in Rome, says that, as well as conquering Britain and the Orkney islands, "we have advanced arms beyond the shores of Iuverna". Although Juvenal is not writing history, it is possible that he is referring to a genuine Roman military expedition to Ireland.

=== Ptolemy ===
The 2nd-century Alexandrian Greek writer Ptolemy, one of the most important geographers, mathematicians and astronomers in the ancient world, refers to Ireland in two of his works. In the astronomical treatise known as the Almagest he gives the latitudes of an island he calls Mikra Brettania (Μικρὰ Βρεττανία) or "Little Britain" (the south of the island at 58 degrees, the north at 61 degrees). In his Geography, at the same latitudes, he places the island Iouernia or Iwernia (Ἰουερνία; ou represented /w/) and named a tribal group called the Iouernoi or Iwernoi (Ἰούερνοι) in the southwest. The Geography contains the most detailed account of Ireland in classical literature, giving the latitude and longitude of six promontories, fifteen river mouths, ten settlements and nine islands, and naming sixteen population groups.

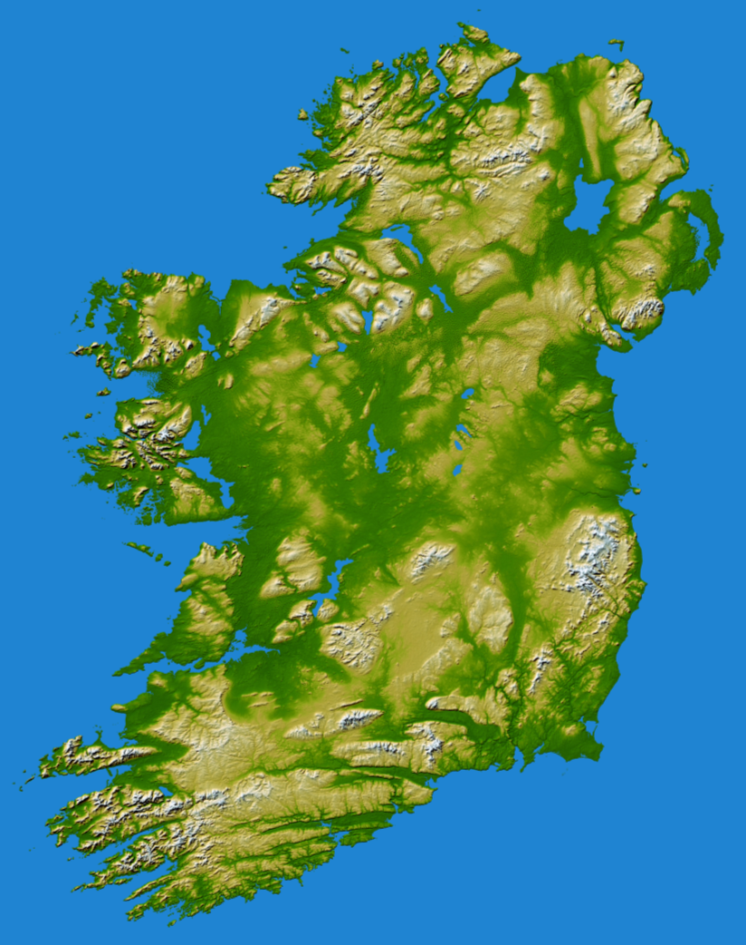

Peoples of Ireland according to Ptolemy's Geography.

==== North coast ====
Ptolemy describes the northern coast of Ireland, from the Northern Promontory (possibly Bloody Foreland or Rossan Point in County Donegal) in the west, to the Wenniknion promontory (probably Malin Head), the mouth of the river Widwa (probably the Foyle), the mouth of the river Argita (perhaps the Bann) and the Rhobogdion promontory (Fair Head, County Antrim) in the east. The peoples who inhabit the north coast are the Wenniknioi in the west and the Rhobogdioi in the east.

==== West coast ====
The west coast is poorly represented compared to the other three, and identification of the names Ptolemy gives is speculative. He begins with the Northern Promontory (see above), and working north to south names the river Rhawiu (possibly the Erne); the town Magnata (a settlement of the Magnatai people, possibly somewhere in County Sligo); the mouth of the rivers Libniu (possibly Clew Bay), Ausoba (perhaps Galway Bay) Senu (probably the Shannon, although placed too far to the north), Dur (possibly Dingle Bay) and Iernu (possibly the Kenmare), and the Southern Promontory (any one of Slea Head, Bray Head, Dursey Head and Mizen Head). Peoples of this coast are: the Erdinoi near Donegal Bay; the Magnatai or Nagnatai of County Mayo and Sligo; the Auteinoi between County Galway and the Shannon, identifiable with the early medieval Uaithni; the Ganganoi, also known in north Wales, and the Wellaboroi in the far south-west.

==== South coast ====
The south coast stretches from the Southern Promontory to the mouths of the rivers Dabrona (possibly the Lee or the Blackwater) and Birgu (probably the Barrow) and the Sacred Promontory (Carnsore Point, County Wexford). Peoples of the south coast are the Iwernoi in the west, who share their name with the island, Iwernia, and can be identified with the early medieval Érainn; the Usdiai, and the Brigantes in the east, who share their name with a people of Roman Britain.

==== East coast ====
From the Sacred Promontory in the south to the Rhobogdion promontory in the north, Ptolemy names the river Modonnu (possibly the Slaney, but more likely the Avoca), the town of Manapia (a settlement of the Manapii), the river Oboka (perhaps the Liffey; the river Avoca takes its modern name from a misinterpretation of Ptolemy's Oboka), the town of Eblana (a settlement of the Eblanoi, formerly mistakenly identified with Dublin), the river Buwinda (the Boyne), the promontory Isamnion, the river Winderios (possibly Carlingford Lough, Dundrum Bay or Strangford Lough), and the river Logia (Belfast Lough, Loch Laoigh in Irish). Peoples named, from south to north, are: the Koriondoi; the Manapioi, possibly related to the Menapii of Gaul; the Kaukoi, probably not related to the Germanic Chauci of the Low Countries; the Eblanoi; the Woluntioi, identifiable with the early medieval Ulaid; and the Darinoi.

=== Later references ===
The people of Ireland are called the Hiberni in the 3rd century Panegyric on Constantius Caesar, written in 297 AD.

The Nomina Provinciarum Omnium ("Names of All the Provinces"), which dates to about AD 312, refers to the Irish as the Scoti. Near the end of that century, Claudian wrote of Roman legions defending Britain from the Scotti, and that Ireland (Hiverne) wept at the mounds of Scotti slain by Roman general Theodosius the Elder. He says that the Scotti then "roused all Ireland" against the Roman commander Stilicho.

Roman sources mention raids on Britain by Saxons of north-west Germany, by Picts from Scotland and by two groups of people usually associated with Ireland, the Scotti and the Atacotti. The origins and meanings of Scotti and Atacotti is uncertain. Atacotti disappears with the Romans. Scotti means Gaels to Adomnán in the late seventh century, but not to Columbanus in the early sixth century, who uses the older term Iberi instead. The Scotti are perhaps a confederation of tribes in Ulster, and the Atacotti one in Leinster, but this is not certain.

== See also ==
- Ogham
- Ogham inscription
