= Bóaire =

Title in Brehon Law

Bóaire was a title given to a member of medieval and earlier Gaelic societies prior to the introductions of English law according to Early Irish law. The term means a "Cow lord". Despite this, a Bóaire was a "free-holder", and ranked below the noble grades but above the unfree. He would own a share of land, which he inherited from members of his kin and which he could not alienate without his kin's approval. He would normally have cattle given to him by a lord in exchange for entering into a clientship relationship.

Some texts give a number of different sub ranks such are the ócaire, young lord, and mruigfher, land man which was the highest non-noble rank.

Despite lacking an actual noble title, a limited number of bóaire could have noble rank in fact either as the head of their kin group, or by performing services or acquiring wealth double that of a normal lord.
