= Timeline of the Irish Confederate Wars =

Presented below is a chronology of the major events of the Irish Confederate Wars from 1641 to 1653. This conflict is also known as the Eleven Years War. The conflict began with the Irish Rebellion of 1641 and ended with the Cromwellian conquest of Ireland (1649–53).

== 1641 ==
- 23 October: Outbreak of the Rebellion. Catholic rebels make an attempt to seize Dublin but their plan is discovered at the last minute and abandoned. In Ulster in the north, Phelim O'Neill takes Charlemont.
- 26 October, Rebels under Phelim O'Neill capture Armagh.
- 11 November, James Butler, 1st Duke of Ormonde is made Lieutenant general of Ireland and head of the English troops there.
- 21 November, The rebels besiege Drogheda.
- 28 November, A rebel attack on Lurgan, in east Ulster, is beaten off by Protestant settler forces.
- 29 November:Battle of Julianstown, an English government force is defeated by Irish Catholic insurgents after it was sent to relieve Drogheda.
- November: Portadown Massacre, The English Protestants in Portadown are driven onto a bridge over the river Bann and then shot, piked or drowned.
- 30 December, the first English reinforcement, 1,100 men under Simon Harcourt, arrives in Dublin.
- December, the lords of the Pale enter the rebellion, as do the Catholic landowners in counties Roscommon, Mayo, Sligo, Tipperary and Kilkenny.

== 1642 ==
Rebellion breaks out in Clare and Limerick in the west and Antrim in the north.

- Charles Coote routs a rebel force at Swords in Dublin.
- March: Drogheda is relieved by English troops.
- 19 March: the English Parliament passes the Adventurers' Act, allowing for the mass confiscation of Catholic land in Ireland.
- March: the Irish Catholic Bishops convene a meeting at Armagh about how to bring the rebellion under control and channel it into the pursuit of Catholic political aims.
- 3, 10 April 000 Scottish troops land in Ulster, sent by the Scottish Parliament to put down the rebellion. English reinforcements land at Dublin and Cork from February to May.
- 15 April: Battle of Kilrush. A rebel force is defeated by English troops near Athy, county Kildare.
- Scottish troops under the Earl of Argyle massacre several hundred Catholic civilians at Rathlin Island. Another massacre is reported at Newry.
- Siege of Limerick (1642) - King John's Castle in Limerick is taken by Confederate Catholic troops under Garret Barry.
- July, Irish Catholic Clergy and nobles draft an Oath binding the rebels together in common cause of upholding the Catholic religion, the liberty of Ireland and the King's rights.
- July, Irish general Owen Roe O'Neill returns to Ireland, landing at Raphoe, Donegal to help the Catholic cause. Thomas Preston, another veteran of the Spanish army, lands at Wexford.
- 22 August, the English Civil War breaks out between the King and Parliament. English forces in Ireland split along these lines.
- 3 September, Battle of Liscarroll. A Catholic army led by Garret Barry is defeated by English Protestant forces near Liscarroll, Cork.
- 24 October, the Confederate Catholic Association of Ireland is established, with its own constitution and capital at Kilkenny. In November it strikes its own coinage It will govern most of Ireland as a de facto sovereign state until 1648.

== 1643 ==
- English Royalist forces take Timolin, 200 Catholic civilians were killed by Ormonde's army.
- 18 March, Battle of New Ross, English Royalist forces defeat a Confederate Catholic army under Thomas Preston.
- 13 June, O'Neill's Ulster Army is routed by the Laggan Army at Clones, losing many of its veteran soldiers. He abandons much of central Ulster to rebuild his army.
- June, a Confederate force under James Tuchet, Earl of Castlehaven defeats the Cork army of Inchiquin at Funcheon Ford. This would prove to be the only significant defeat of the Cork Protestant army in the 1640s.
- September: The Ulster army led by Owen Roe O'Neill defeats an Irish Protestant force at the Battle of Portlester.
- September: A ceasefire known as the Cessation is arranged between the Confederates and English Royalists under Ormonde, effective from 15 September. Negotiations start to create a more formal alliance. Many Royalist troops are withdrawn to fight in England. The Scots in Ulster remain hostile to the Confederates.
- November, 4,000 of the English royalist troops in Dublin are sent back to England.

== 1644 ==
- The Confederates launch an offensive of 6,000 men, led by Castlehaven, against the Scots in Ulster, but it proves inconclusive.
- A foray by the Scots into Confederate territory in County Longford is turned back at the bridge at Finnea by a force under

Myles "the Slasher" O'Reilly.

- The Confederates send 1,500 troops to Scotland under Alasdair MacColla to fight on the Royalist side there.
- The English Royalist troops in Cork defect to the Parliament.
- The Confederates take Bandon

== 1645 ==
- 20 January, the Siege of Duncannon begins.
- 18 March, Duncannonn surrenders to the Confederate force under Thomas Preston.
- Confederate generals Preston and Castlehaven besiege Youghal but fail to take it.
- Catholic Bishop Malachy O'Queally is killed leading a Confederate attempt to take Sligo.
- Papal Nuncio, Giovanni Battista Rinuccini lands in Kerry with arms and money to aid the Confederates.

== 1646 ==
- 28 March, The Ormonde Peace is signed, committing the Confederates to an alliance with the English Royalists in return for concessions to Catholics. It is condemned by Rinuccini and the Catholic Bishops.
- An English Parliamentarian naval force lands at Dingle and sacks the town.
- The parliamentarians occupy Bunratty Castle but are then besieged by Confederate troops and forced to surrender.
- June, Battle of Benburb, a Scottish Covenanter army is smashed by the Confederate Ulster Army under Owen Roe O'Neill.
- Confederate troops take Roscommon.
- Confederate Armies under Preston and O'Neill march on Kilkenny to reject the Ormonde peace. Those who signed it are arrested.
- O'Neill and Preston besiege Dublin, held by the Royalist Earl of Ormonde. However they lift the siege due to bad weather and a failure to agree on strategy.

== 1647 ==
- Spring: Inchiquin launches a major offensive in Munster, quickly capturing Dromana, Cappoquin and Dungarvan.
- June 1647: Ormonde surrenders Dublin to the English Parliamentarians, preferring them to the Catholic Confederates.
- August: The Confederate Leinster Army is destroyed by an English Parliamentarian force at the battle of Dungan's Hill, in county Meath.
- Owen Roe ONeills Ulster Army lays waste to the area around Dublin, burning food supplies to prevent the Parliamentarian army under from advancing into Confederate territory.
- September: Sack of Cashel, Parliamentarian forces under Inchiquin sack Cashel, County Tipperary and massacre its garrison.
- November 1647: Battle of Knocknanauss. The Confederate Munster Army is routed by the Parliamentarians in county Cork.

== 1648 ==
- Inchiquin, Protestant commander in Cork, changes sides, from the English Parliament to the King and signs a truce with the Confederates.
- The Confederates sign the Second Ormonde Peace - a revised deal with the Royalists. The Confederation splits over the Treaty and a civil war breaks out between the pro-Royalist Confederates and the hardline Catholics, led by Rinnucini and most powerful in the Ulster Army of Owen Roe O'Neill.
- The English Parliamentarian garrison at Derry is besieged by the Scots, who have also signed an alliance with the Royalists.
- Owen Roe O'Neill relieves the Parliamentarians besieged at Derry in return for supplies and offers to make a separate peace with them.

== 1649 ==
- February- Ormonde returns to Ireland, and after arriving at Kilkenny, dissolves the Catholic Confederation.
- 23 February, Papal nuncio Rinuccini leaves Ireland.
- 2 August 1649: battle of Rathmines, a combined Royalist/Confederate force is defeated by the English Parliamentarians outside Dublin.
- 15 August, Oliver Cromwell lands in Dublin with the New Model Army to re-conquer Ireland.
- 17 August: Henry Ireton lands with the remainder of the Parliamentarian force.
- 11 September: English Parliamentarian troops storm Drogheda and massacre its garrison Siege of Drogheda.
- Owen Roe O'Neill re-joins the Confederate/Royalist coalition.
- 2 October, Parliamentarian forces lay siege to Wexford.
- 11 October: Sack of Wexford, Cromwell's troops take Wexford, put its garrison to the sword and burn much of the town.
- 15 October: English Parliamentarian troops under Henry Ireton lay siege to Duncannon.
- 19 October: New Ross surrenders on terms to Cromwell.
- 5 November, the siege of Duncannon is raised due to bad weather and a stubborn defence by the town's garrison.
- 6 November, Owen Roe O'Neill dies of disease.
- 19 November: English Parliamentarians take Carrick on Suir in a surprise attack.
- 24 November: Ulster Irish troops attack Carrick but are beaten off with heavy casualties.
- Parliamentarian forces arrive before Waterford, beginning the Siege of Waterford
- November, Battle of Arklow (1649). An army led by Inchiquin fails to destroy a force of English Parliamentarian soldiers.
- 6 December: Battle of Lisnagarvey. The Parliamentarians defeat a Scottish pro-Royalist force in county Down.
- 10 December: The Siege of Waterford is abandoned. The Parliamentarians go into winter quarters at Dungarven.

== 1650 ==
- April: Cromwell besieges Clonmel (Siege of Clonmel).
- May: New Model Army troops assault Clonmel but are beaten off with heavy casualties. The garrison slips away and the town surrenders on terms the next day.
- Cromwell leaves Ireland
- Charles II repudiates the Second Ormonde Peace and his alliance with Irish Catholics. Cromwell publishes lenient surrender terms for Protestant Royalists.
- The Protestant Royalist garrisons in Munster defect to the Parliamentarian side.
- 10 May, Battle of Macroom, Irish Confederate force defeated near Macroom, Cork.
- 19 June, Siege and Battle of Tecroghan, near Trim. tactical Irish victory.
- 21 June: Battle of Scarrifholis, near Letterkenny. The Irish Ulster army is defeated and destroyed by English Parliamentarian forces.
- July: Carlow falls to Parliamentarian troops. Waterford is besieged again.
- July: The Siege of Charlemont begins.
- 8 August, Parliamentarian attacks on Charlemont are repulsed with heavy losses.
- 14 August, Charlemont surrenders.
- 10 August, Waterford surrenders to Parliamentarian troops.
- 12 August, Duncannon surrenders.
- 25 October, Battle of Meelick Island, the Irish Connaught Army is routed and the Parliamentarians cross the Shannon into the west of Ireland.
- October, Henry Ireton arrives before Limerick but has to lift the siege and retire to winter quarters.
- December, Ormonde, erstwhile Royalist commander, flees for France.

== 1651 ==
- April, due to persistent guerrilla warfare by Irish Catholic bands, reprisals on civilians in several areas including county Wicklow and much of the south are proclaimed by the Parliamentarians.
- June: Ireton arrives again before Limerick and constructs fortifications for a long siege Siege of Limerick (1650–1651).
- July 1651: Battle of Knocknaclashy, an Irish force trying to relieve Limerick is defeated and scattered near Banteer, Cork.
- August: Siege of Galway begins, Parliamentarian forces under Charles Coote besiege Galway.
- 27 October: Limerick surrenders.

== 1652 ==
- 12 May: Galway surrenders.
- May, most of the bigger Irish guerrilla bands surrender under terms published at Kilkenny, allowing them to go abroad to serve in Catholic armies.
- 12 August: Act for the Settlement of Ireland 1652 is passed by the English Rump Parliament, allowing for the mass confiscation of Catholic owned land and the execution of those held responsible for the rebellion 1641.

== 1653 ==
- 27 April, The last organised Irish Catholic force, Phillip O'Reilly, surrenders at Cloughoughter, county Cavan.
