= Hugh Dubh O'Neill =

Irish military commander (1611–1660)

Hugh Dubh O’Neill
- Born: c. 1611; Brussels, Spanish Netherlands, (modern day Belgium)
- Died: c. 1660 (aged 48-49); Madrid, Spain
- Relatives: Hugh O’Neill (great-uncle); Art MacBaron O'Neill (grandfather); Owen Roe O'Neill (uncle)
- Military career
- Allegiance: Spanish Empire; Confederate Ireland
- Known for: His Defence of Clonmel during the Cromwellian Conquest of Ireland
- Conflicts: Franco-Spanish War; Siege of Arras; Irish Confederate Wars; Battle of Clones (POW); Siege of Clonmel; Siege of Limerick (surrendered); Reapers' War

Hugh Dubh O'Neill, 5th Earl of Tyrone ("Black Hugh", meaning "black-haired" or "dark tempered") (1611–1660) was an Irish soldier of the 17th century. He is best known for his participation in the Irish Confederate Wars and in particular his defence of Clonmel in 1650.

O'Neill Coat of arms.

== Early Life ==
O'Neill was a member of the O'Neill dynasty, the leaders of which left Ireland in the flight of the Earls in 1607. Hugh Dubh's father, Art Óg O'Neill, was among those exiles who made careers for themselves in the Spanish Army of Flanders. Hugh Dubh was, as a result, born in Brussels in 1611 and grew up in the Irish military community there, becoming a professional soldier and serving in the Irish regiment of the Spanish army in Flanders during the Eighty Years' War against the United Provinces of the Netherlands.

== Military career ==
In 1642, his uncle, Owen Roe O'Neill, organised the return of 300 Irish officers in the Spanish service to Ireland to support the Irish Rebellion of 1641. O'Neill's men became the nucleus of the Ulster army of Confederate Ireland - a de facto independent Irish state. Hugh Dubh was captured at the Battle of Clones early in the war by the Scottish Covenanters, but was exchanged back to his own side after the Confederate victory at the Battle of Benburb in 1646. He subsequently rose to prominence after the death of his commander, Owen Roe O'Neill, in 1649.

Oliver Cromwell.

In 1649, after the onset of the Cromwellian conquest of Ireland, Hugh Dubh was sent south with 2,000 of the best Ulster troops to defend southern Ireland. He distinguished himself at the Siege of Clonmel in May 1650, inflicting the worst casualties ever experienced by the New Model Army. He was then made commander of the defenders at the Siege of Limerick (1650–1651), fighting off the Parliamentarians' first attempt to take the city in late 1650. However, the following year, Henry Ireton besieged the city again, eventually forcing Hugh Dubh to surrender when the city's population was dying of hunger and plague, and part of his garrison mutinied against him. Ireton himself died of disease. Under the terms of surrender, Hugh Dubh was to be executed for his stubborn defence of the city, but the Parliamentarian general Edmund Ludlow did not carry out the sentence and instead sent Hugh Dubh into imprisonment in the Tower of London.

== Later life and death ==
Hugh Dubh's imprisonment was cut short by the intervention of the Spanish Ambassador to England, who argued that Hugh Dubh was a Spanish subject. Hugh Dubh was subsequently released into Spanish custody on condition that he would not serve in campaigns against English forces. He did not, therefore, return to Flanders, but was posted to Spain, where he became a General of Artillery, helping to suppress a rebellion (known as the Reaper's War) in Catalonia. He became the Spanish recognised 5th Earl of Tyrone upon the death of his first cousin, Hugh Eoghan. In around 1660, after the English Restoration, Hugh Dubh wrote to Charles II and asked for his family's ancestral lands to be restored, and that he be made the English Earl of Tyrone. However, Charles did not grant the request and Hugh Dubh died of disease later that year.

== See also ==
- Irish Confederate Wars
- Wars of the Three Kingdoms

== Sources ==
- J.G. Simms, War and Politics in Ireland 1649-1730, Hambledon Press, London, 1986.
