= Owen Roe (disambiguation) =

Owen Roe (Irish: Eoghan Rua[dh]) most commonly refers to Owen Roe O'Neill (c. 1585–1649), an Irish nobleman and military leader, or to institutions named for him:

- Owen Roe O'Neill's GAC (County Tyrone)
- CLG Eoghan Rua (County Londonderry)
- Eoghan Ruadh, Dungannon GAA
- "The Lament for Owen Roe", ballad

It may also refer to:

- Eoghan Rua Ó Súilleabháin, poet
- Eoghan Ruadh Mac an Bhaird, poet
- Owen Roe McGovern, Gaelic footballer
- Owen Roe (actor)
