= Flood wall =

Wall for flooding prevention

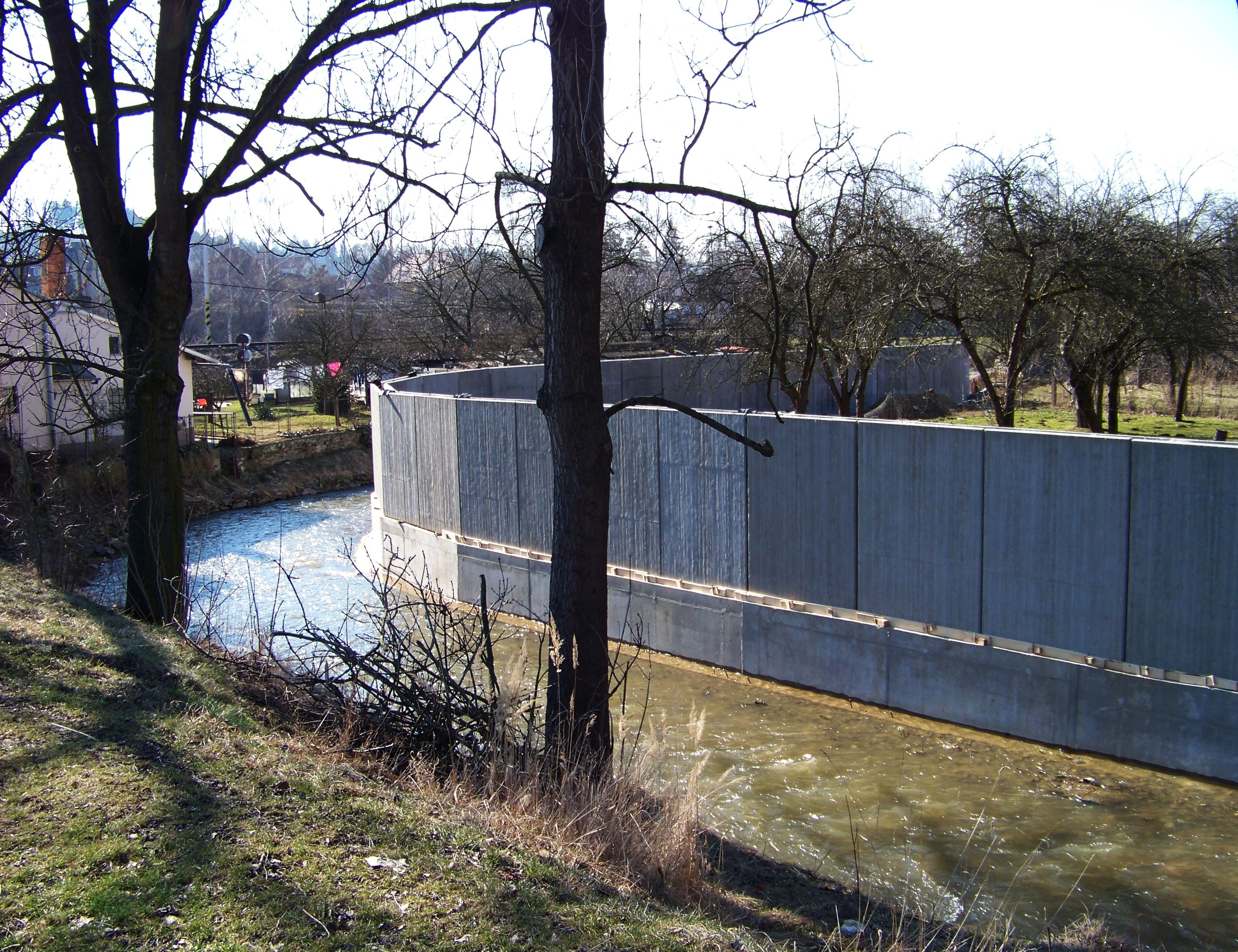
A floodwall at Zruč nad Sázavou, Czech Republic

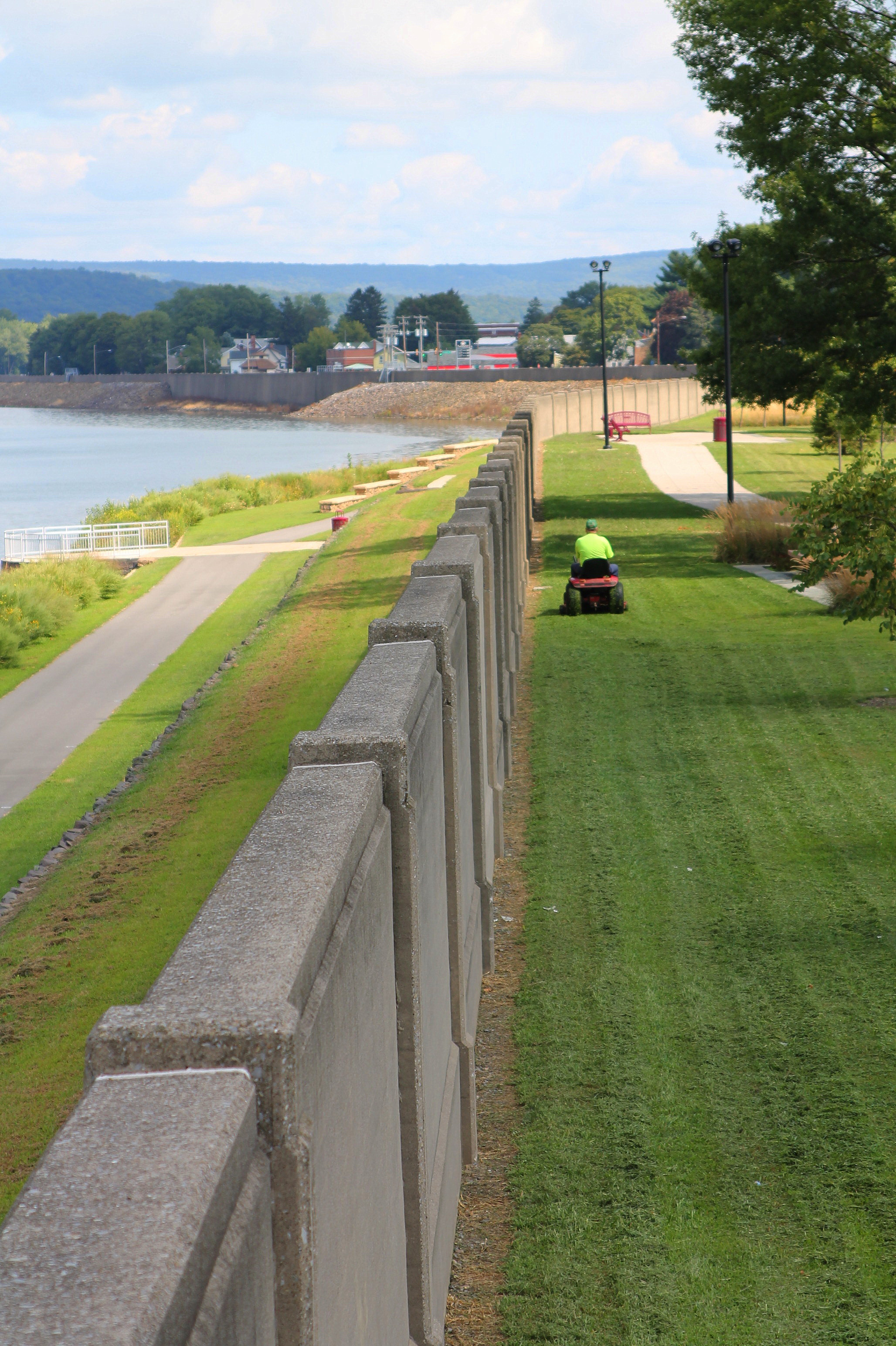
Floodwall in Sunbury, Pennsylvania

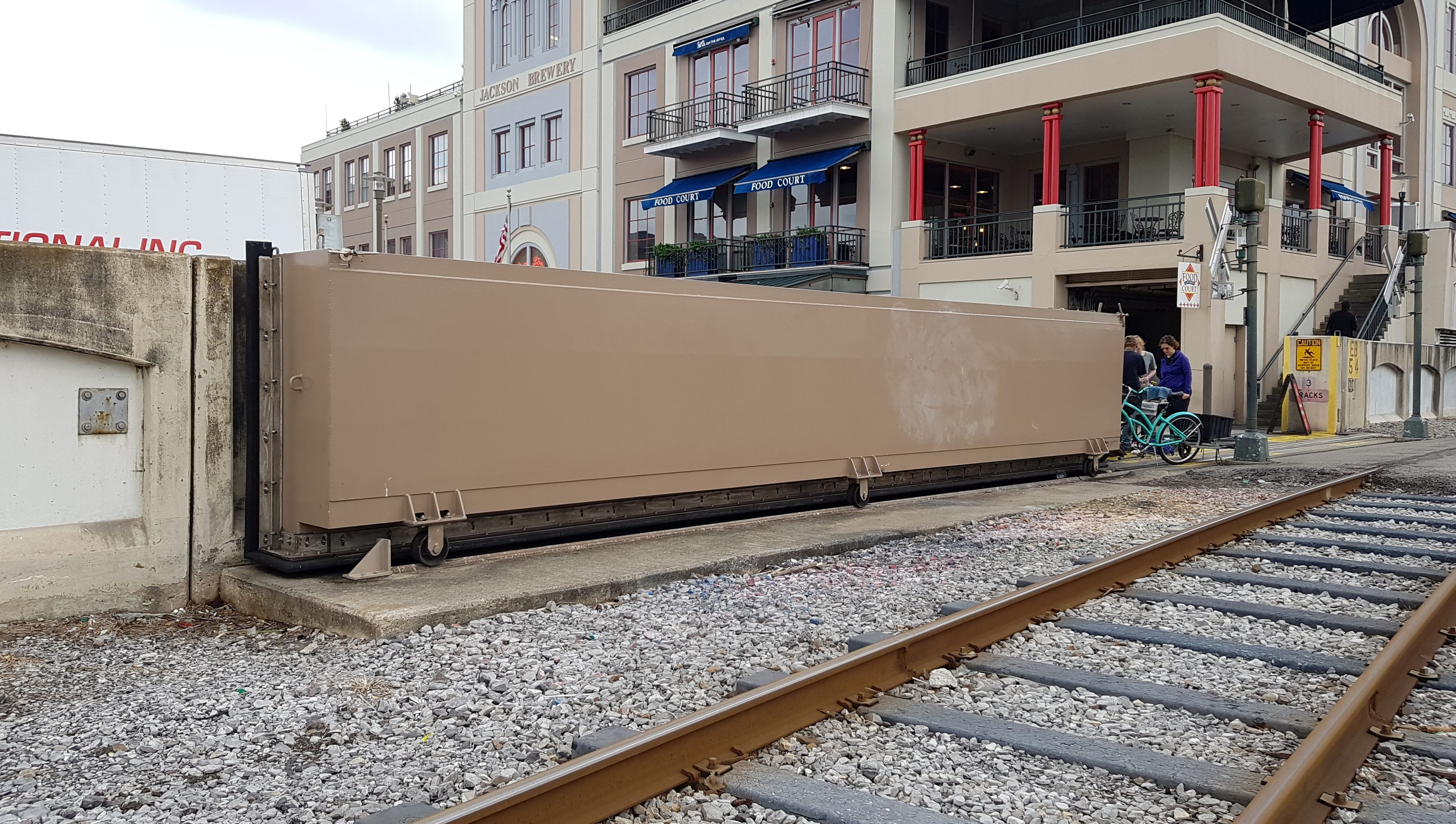
Floodwall and a sliding gate in New Orleans French Market (1986)

A floodwall is a freestanding, permanent, engineered structure designed to prevent encroachment of floodwaters. Floodwalls are mainly used on locations where space is scarce, such as cities or where building levees or dikes (dykes) would interfere with other interests, such as existing buildings, historical architecture or commercial use of embankments.

Floodwalls are nowadays mainly constructed from pre-fabricated concrete elements. Floodwalls often have coupures, which are large openings to provide passage of traffic except during periods of flooding, when they are closed. As a floodwalls mostly consist of relatively short elements compared to dikes, the connections between the elements are critical to prevent the failure of the floodwall.

The substantial costs of floodwalls can be justified by the value of commercial property thus protected from damage caused by flooding. Floodwalls are sometimes bad for ecosystems. Floodwalls are almost always built in cities.

== See also ==
- Floodgate
- Levee
- Seawall
- Gabion
- Maccaferri gabion
