= Coupure =

Structural feature

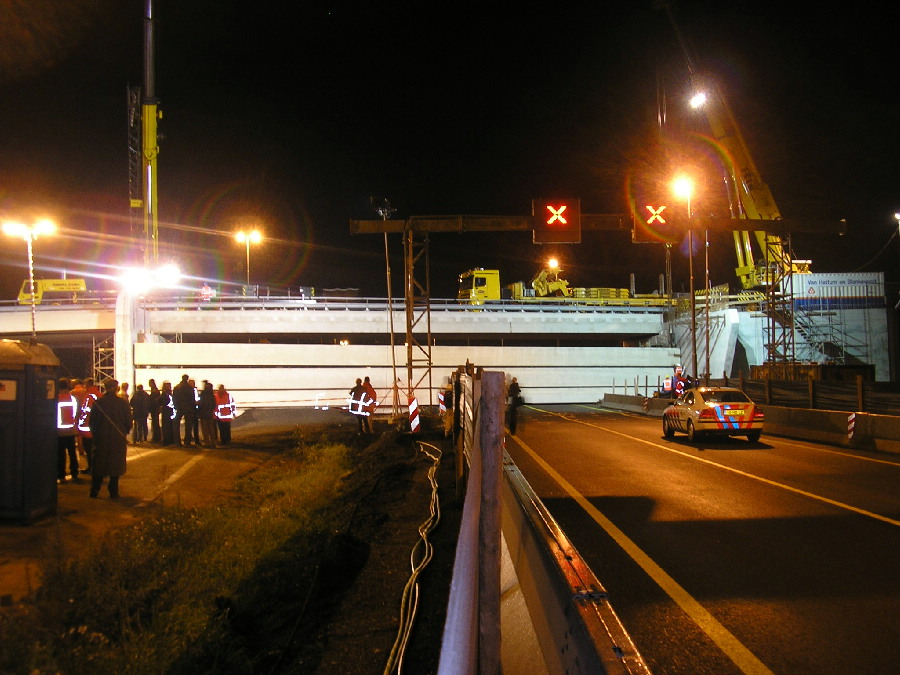
A coupure where the A2 motorway crosses the Diefdijk (Hollandic Water Line) in the Netherlands.

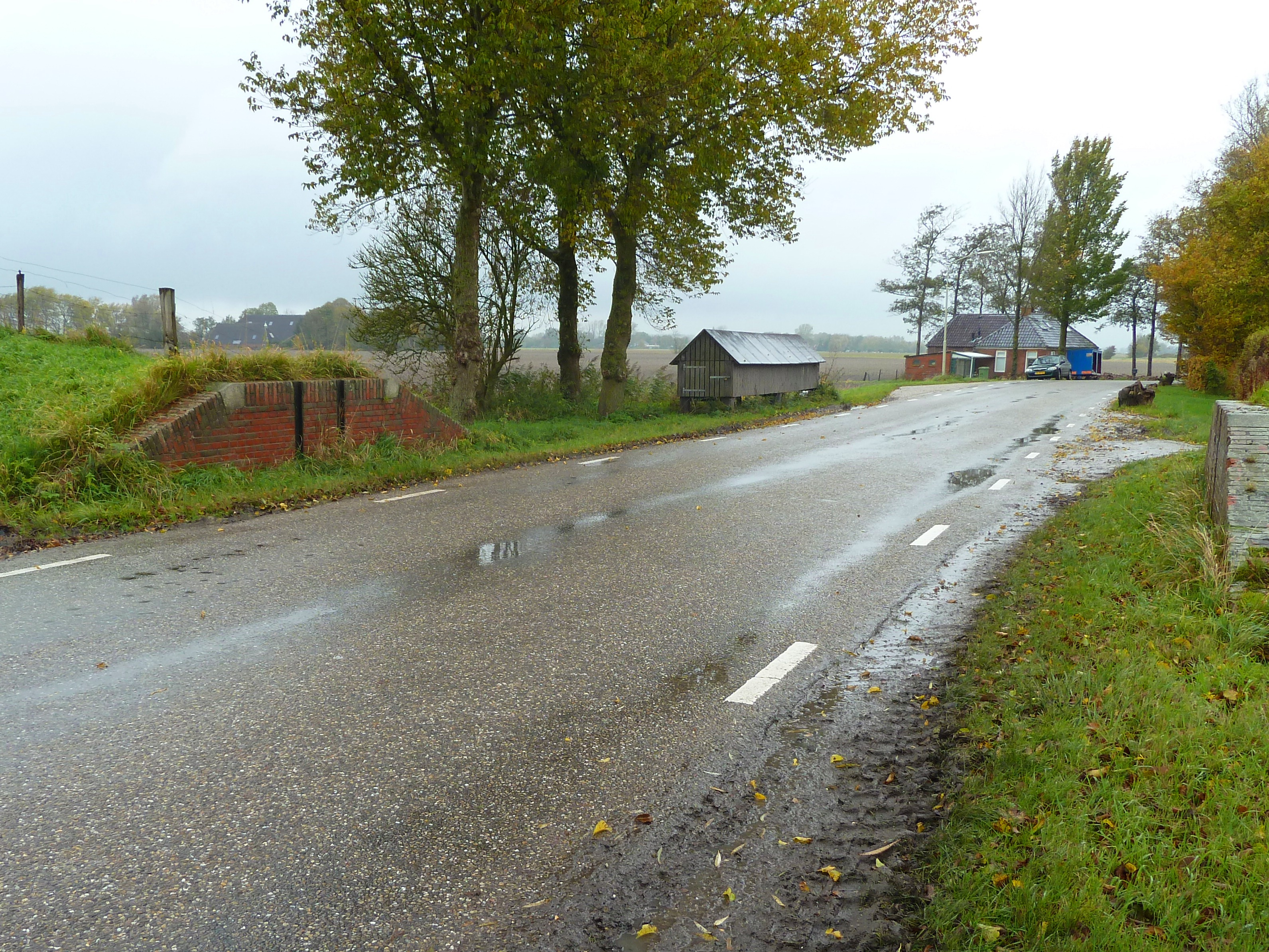
A coupure with a shed for storing the materials used to close the coupure in Het Hogeland

A coupure is a means of closing an opening in a wall, floodwall or levee (dike). The word comes from the French verb couper which means "to cut". In historic times a coupure was a location where a breach in the city walls or the walls of a fortress was closed. In more modern times a coupure is a way of allowing traffic to pass a flood protection structure.

== Military ==
During a siege, a coupure is a ditch, earthwork or wooden palisade built behind a breach made by the attacker's guns in the walls of a fortress or a city. Its purpose is to hinder and frustrate an attack made by the forlorn hope.

This was a strategy used many times by defenders of fortifications, for example, by the Irish defenders during the Siege of Clonmel (April - May 1650).

It can also be a passage through a glacis to create a sally port, so that the defenders can launch a sortie against the attackers.

== Civil engineering ==
When a road or railway crosses a floodwall or levee the road or railway can either be laid on a grade or through a cut in the floodwall or levee. In case of expected flooding the cut can temporarily be closed. This type of coupure is also known as vehicle gate, floodwall gate or similar names. The closure can be accomplished by various means.

The most basic means of closing a coupure is with soil or sandbags. More sophisticated means of closing a coupure consist of wooden or metal beams or doors. Older coupures are usually brick structures with provisions for placing two stacks of beams between them. Between the stacks of beams, which form two walls, horse manure or other animal faeces mixed with straw is dumped and compacted. This type of material swells when wet, thus providing additional waterproofing. Modern coupures can consist of only one wall and can be made watertight with the help of rubber flaps or other materials.

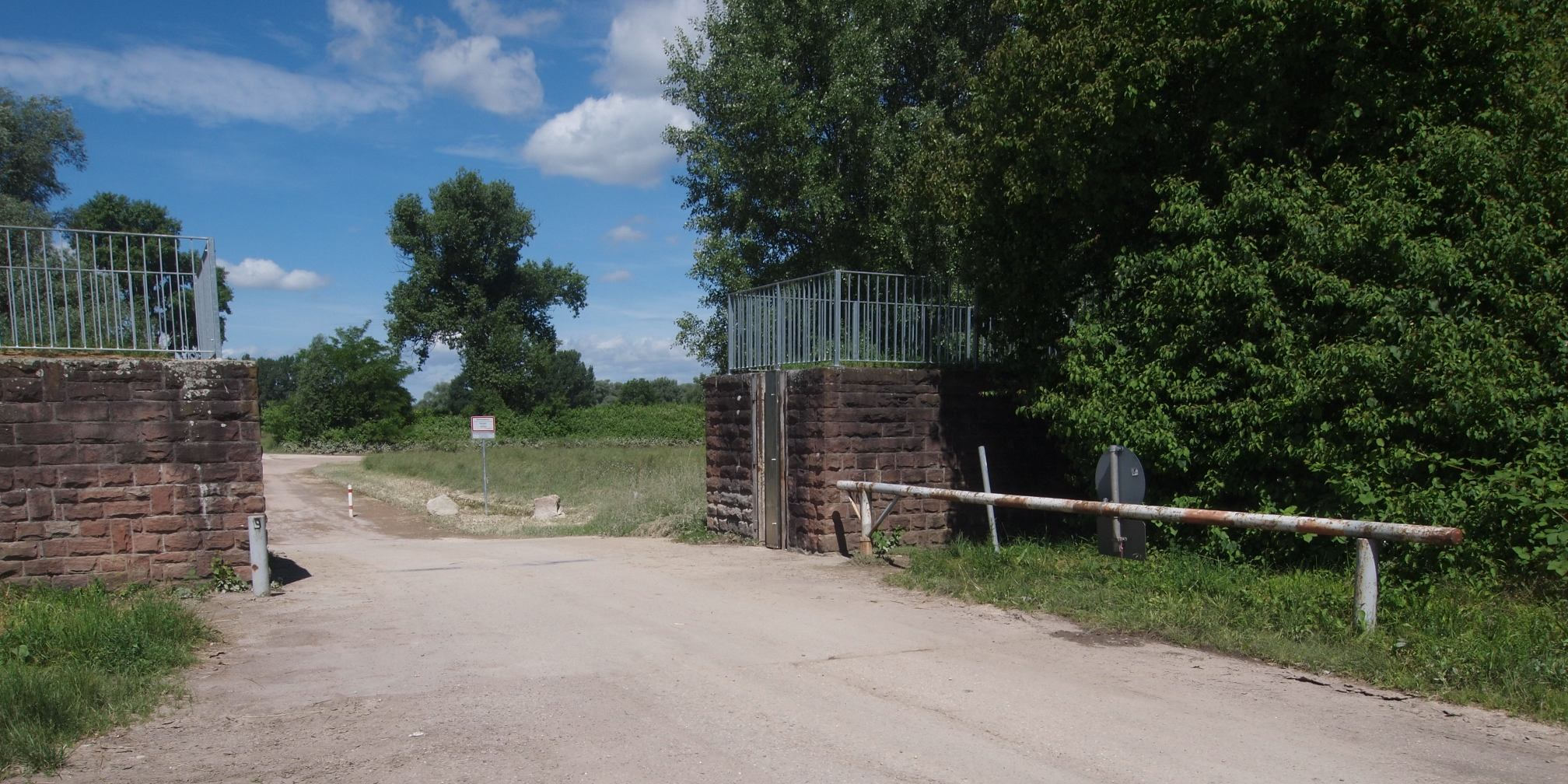
A coupure

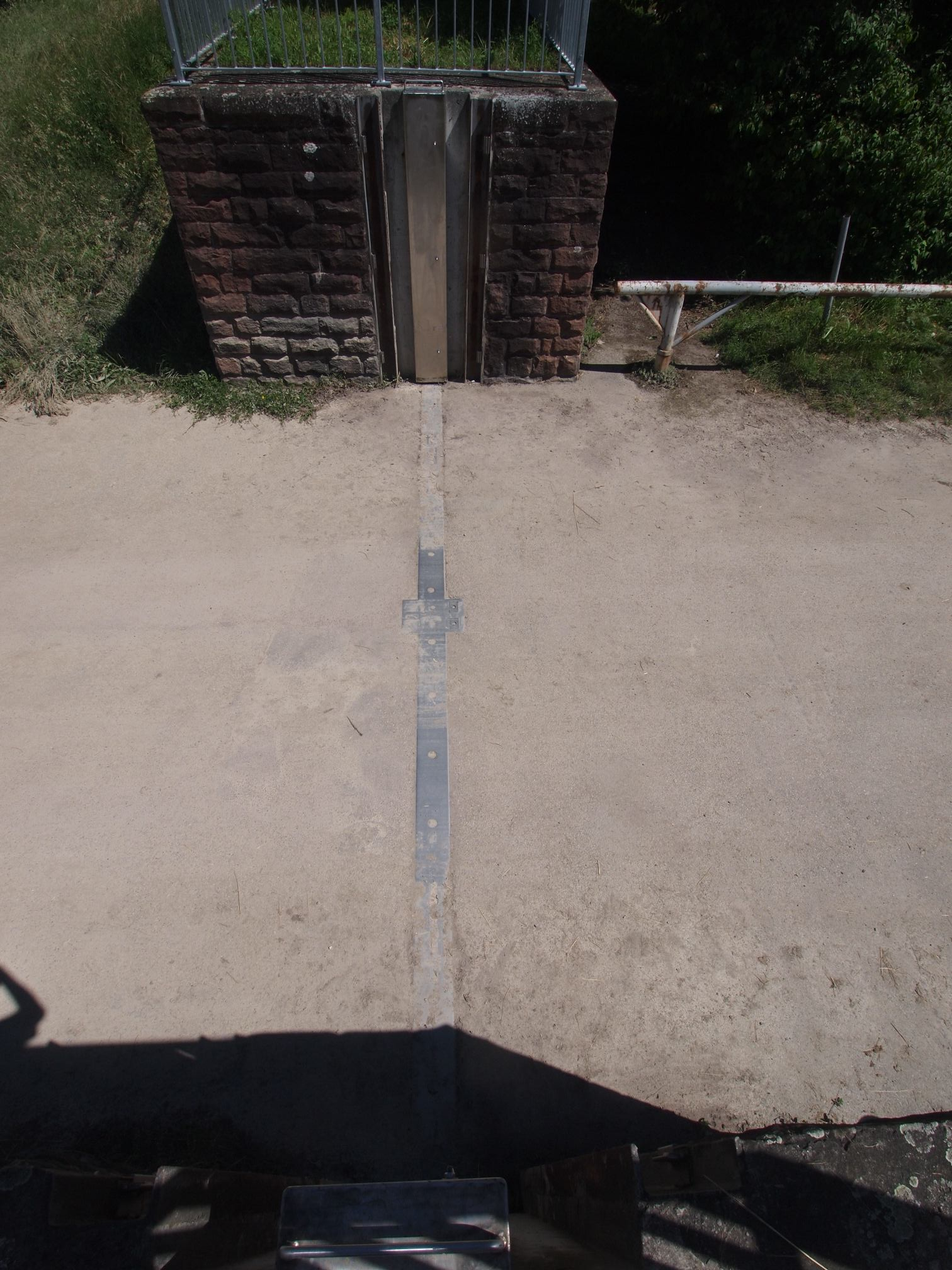
The opening

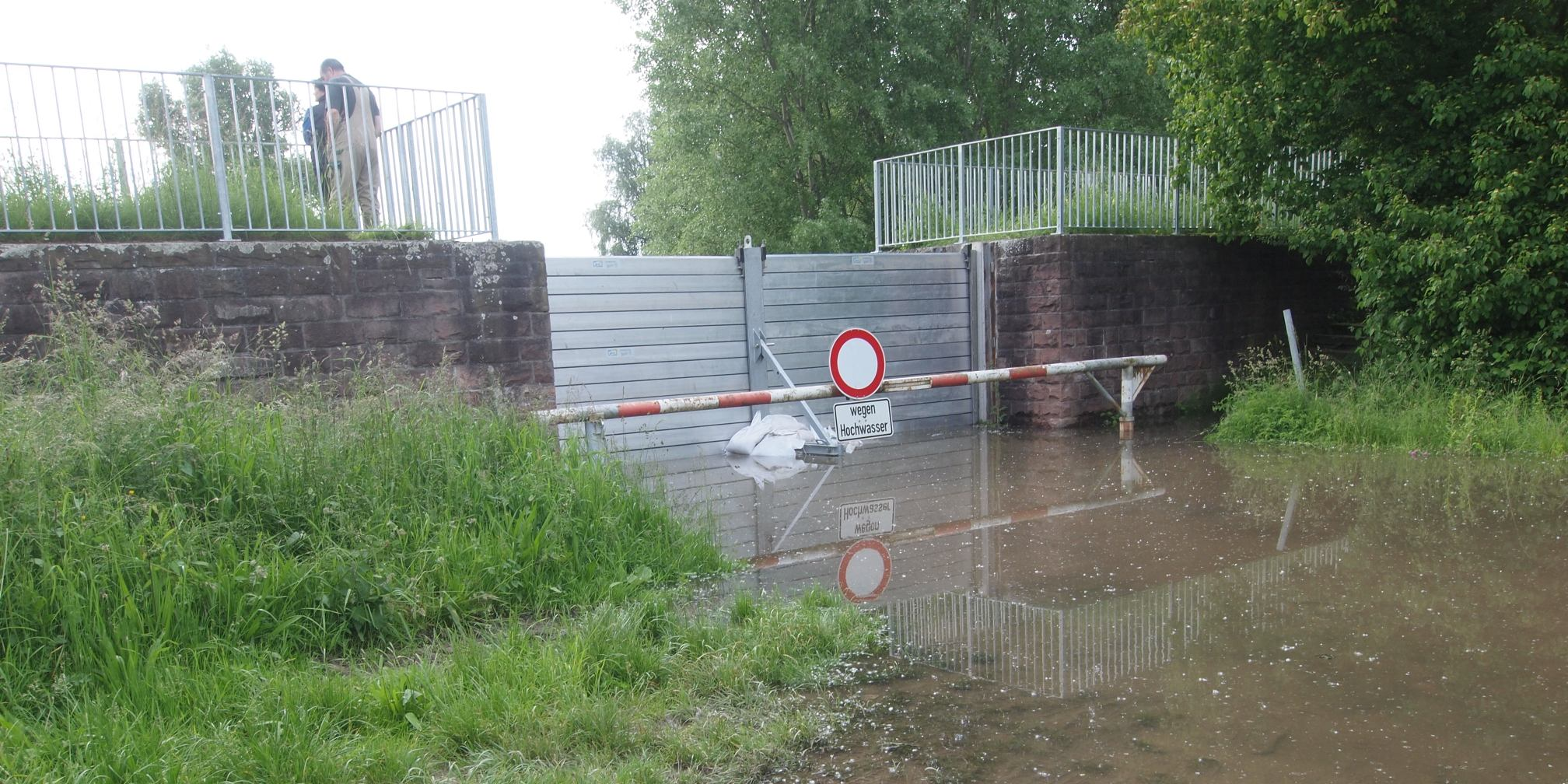
With a floodwall installed

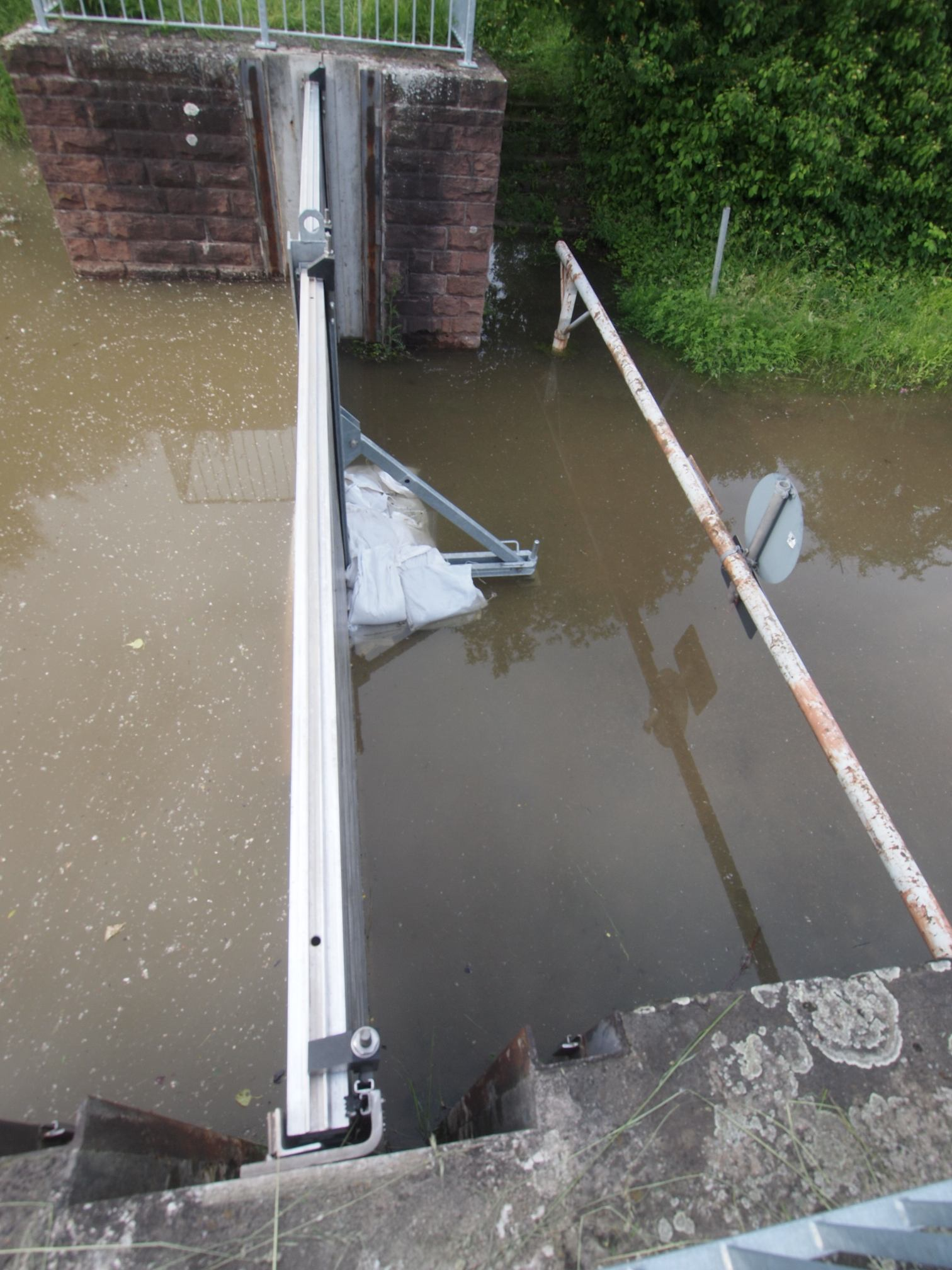
The wall from above
