= Siege of Limerick (1650–1651) =

Battle during Cromwell's conquest of Ireland in 1651

Coordinates: 52.669722°N 8.625556°W

- Part of the Cromwellian conquest of Ireland
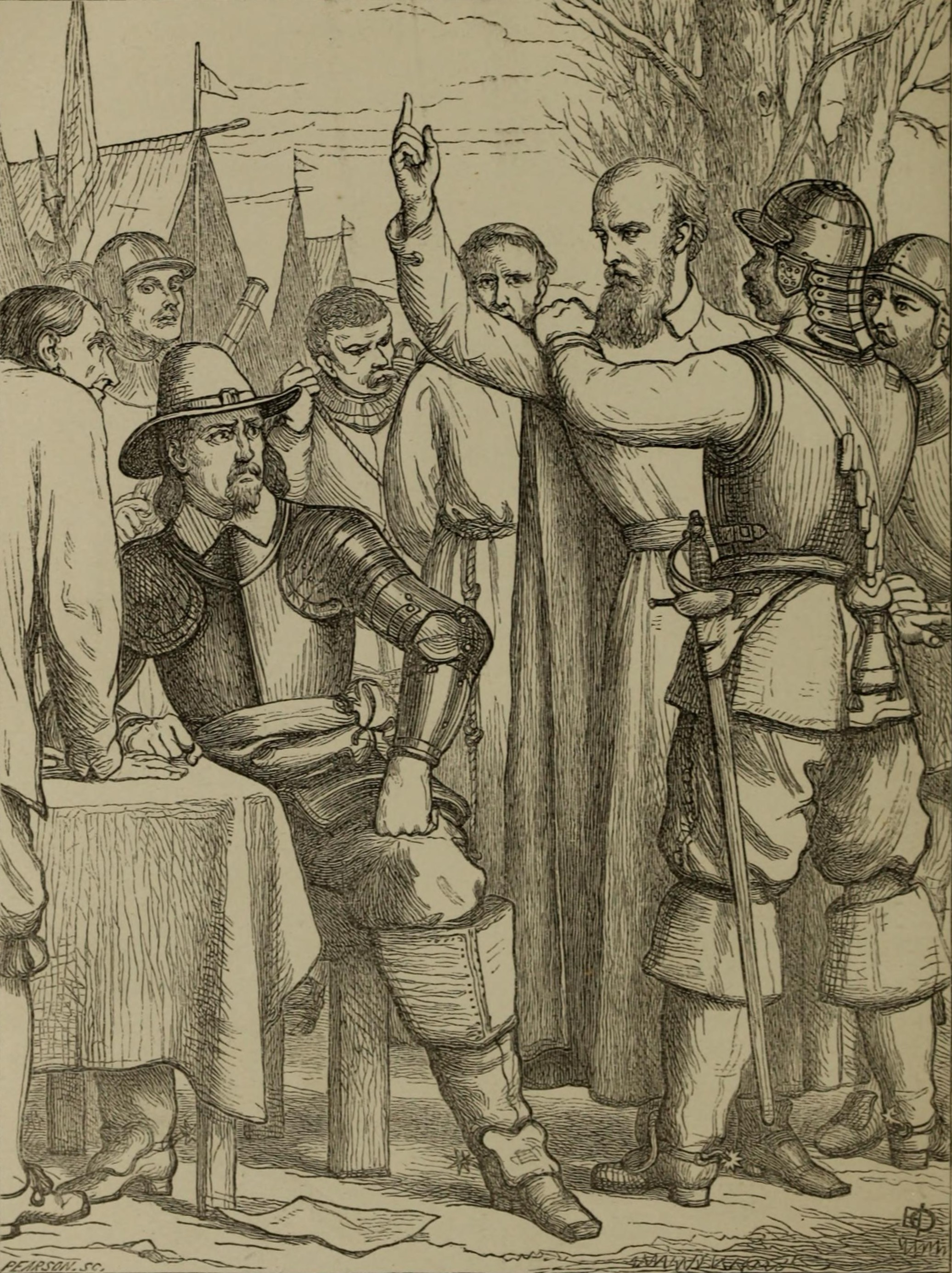
- Ireton condemning the Bishop of Limerick (illustration by H. E. Doyle, 1868)
Date	19 June – 27 October 1651 (4 months, 1 week and 1 day)
Location	Limerick, Kingdom of Ireland
Result	Parliamentarian victory

Belligerents
Irish Confederates; English Royalists	Parliamentarians

Commanders and leaders
Hugh O'Neill	Henry Ireton # Hardress Waller

Strength
2,000	8,000 soldiers 28 siege guns 4 mortars

Casualties and losses
700 soldiers killed	2,000 killed
- 5,000 civilians killed

Ireland and Limerick

Limerick, in western Ireland was the scene of two sieges during the Irish Confederate Wars. The second and largest of these took place during the Cromwellian conquest of Ireland in 1650–51. Limerick was one of the last fortified cities held by an alliance of Irish Confederates and Royalists against the forces of the English Parliament. Its garrison, led by Hugh Dubh O'Neill, surrendered to Henry Ireton after a protracted and bitter siege. Over 2,000 soldiers of Cromwell's New Model Army were killed at Limerick, and Henry Ireton, Cromwell's son-in-law, died of plague.

== Ireton's first siege, October 1650 ==
By 1650, the Irish Confederates and their English Royalist allies had been driven out of eastern Ireland by Cromwell's conquest of Ireland. They defended the line position behind the River Shannon, of which Limerick was the southern stronghold. Oliver Cromwell himself had left Ireland in May 1650, delegating his command of the Parliamentarian forces in Ireland to Henry Ireton, who sent Hardress Waller to take Limerick. The town was defended by Hugh Dubh O'Neill with a remainder of the confederate Ulster army. When Waller's vanguard approached the town, the town counsel also accepted James Tuchet, 3rd Earl of Castlehaven with his royalist troops into town. On 9 September 1650, Waller summoned the town to surrender. Waller was joined by Ireton somewhat later. However, the weather was increasingly wet and cold and Ireton was forced to abandon the siege before the onset of winter. He therefore retreated to his winter-quarters at Kilkenny where he arrived on 10 November 1650.

== June 1651, Ireton returns – Limerick blockaded ==
Ireton returned the following year on 3 June 1651 with 8,000 men, 28 siege artillery pieces and 4 mortars. He then summoned Hugh Dubh O'Neill, the Irish commander of Limerick to surrender, but was refused. The siege was on.

Limerick in 1651 was split into two sections, English town and Irish town, which were separated by the Abbey River. English town, which contained the citadel of King John's Castle, was encircled by water, the Abbey river on three sides and the Shannon on the other, in what was known as King's Island. There was only one bridge onto the island – Thomond bridge – which was fortified with bastioned earthworks. Irish town was more vulnerable, but was also more heavily fortified. Its medieval walls had been buttressed by 20 feet (about 6 metres) of earth, making it difficult to knock a breach in them. In addition, Irish town had a series of bastions along its walls, mounted with cannon which covered its approaches. The biggest of these bastions were at St John's Gate and Mungret Gate. The garrison of the city was 2,000 strong and composed mainly of veterans from the Confederate's Ulster army, commanded by O'Neill, who had distinguished themselves at the siege of Clonmel the previous year.

Because Limerick was very well fortified, Ireton did not risk an assault on its walls. Instead he secured the approaches to the city, cut off its supplies and built artillery earthworks to bombard the defenders. His troops took the fort at Thomond bridge, but the Irish destroyed the bridge itself, denying the Parliamentarians land access to English town. Ireton then tried an amphibious attack on the city, a storming party attacking the city in small boats. They were initially successful, but O'Neill's men counterattacked and beat them off. After this attack failed, Ireton resolved to starve the city into submission and built two forts known as Ireton's fort and Cromwell's fort on nearby Singland Hill. An Irish attempt to relieve the city from the south was routed at the Battle of Knocknaclashy. O'Neill's only hope was now to hold out until bad weather and hunger forced Ireton to raise the siege. To this end, O'Neill tried to send the town's old men, women and children out of the city so that his supplies would last a little longer. However, Ireton's men killed 40 of these civilians and sent the rest back into Limerick.

== Surrender, October 1651 ==
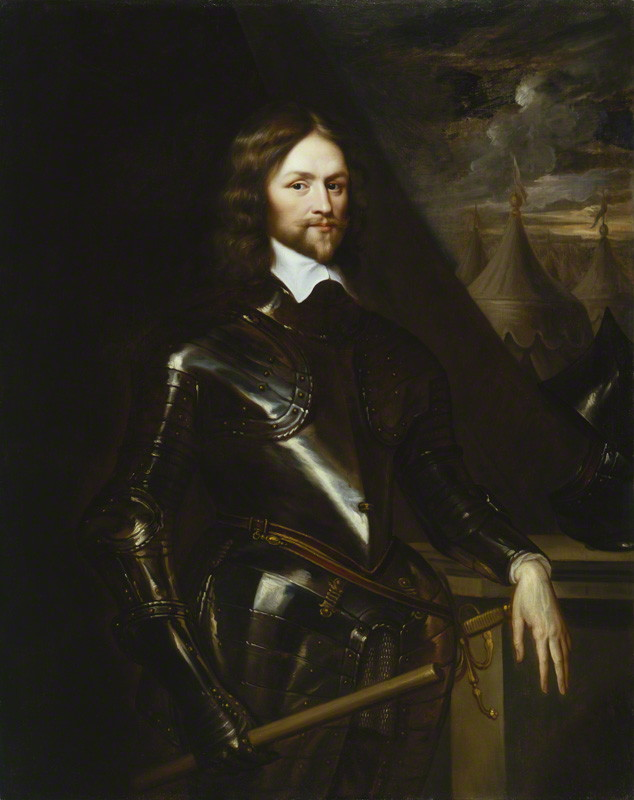
Henry Ireton, the English Parliamentarian commander who besieged Limerick in 1651

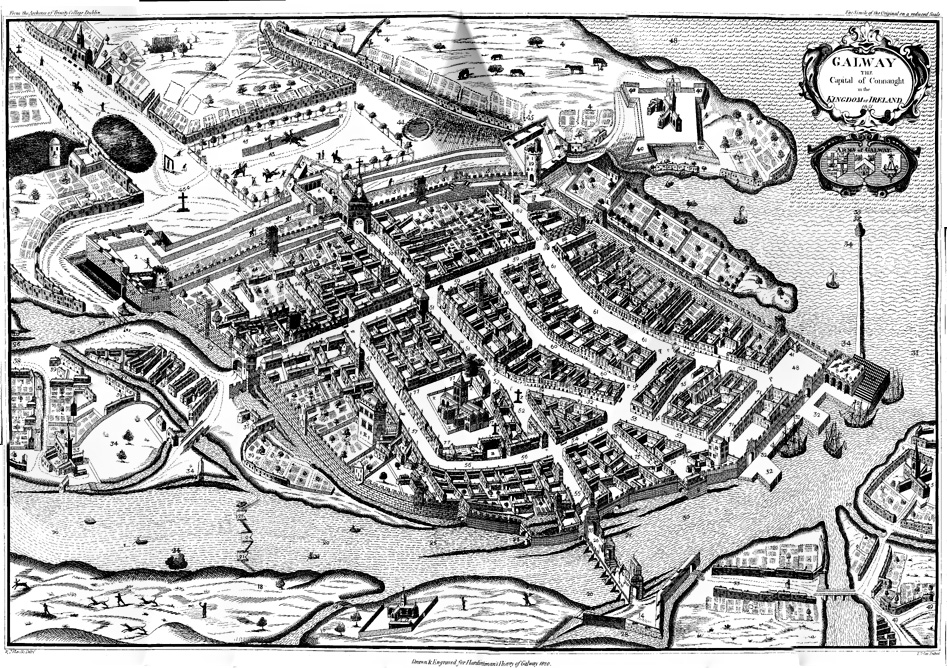
Map of Galway circa 1651

After this point, O'Neill came under pressure from the town's mayor and civilian population to surrender. The town's garrison and civilians suffered terribly from hunger and disease, especially an outbreak of plague. What was more, Ireton found a weak point in the defences of Irish town, and knocked a breach in them, opening the prospect of an all-out assault. Eventually in October 1651, four months after the siege had started, part of Limerick's garrison (English Royalists under Colonel Fennell) mutinied and turned some cannon inwards, threatening to fire on O'Neill's men unless they surrendered. Hugh Dubh O'Neill surrendered Limerick on 27 October.

The inhabitants lives and property were respected, but they were warned that they could be evicted in the future. The garrison was allowed to march to Galway, which was still holding out, but had to leave their weapons behind. However, the lives of the civilian and military leaders of Limerick were excepted from the terms of surrender. A Catholic Bishop Terence Albert O'Brien, an Alderman and the English Royalist officer Colonel Fennell (who the Parliamentarians said was a "soldier of fortune") were hanged. O'Neill was also sentenced to death, but was reprieved by the Parliamentarian commander Edmund Ludlow and imprisoned instead in London. Former mayor Dominic Fanning was drawn, quartered, and decapitated, with his head mounted over St. John's Gate. Three Woulfes were sentenced to death for their role in the defense of Limerick: the mayor and the head of the Franciscans were caught and executed. The third, Captain James Woulfe, escaped and eventually made his way to England. That Woulfe was the grandfather of General James Wolfe.

== The cost ==
Over 2,000 English Parliamentary soldiers died at Limerick, mostly from disease. Among them was Henry Ireton, who died a month after the fall of the city. About 700 of the Irish garrison died and an unknown, but probably far greater number of civilians – usually estimated at 5,000.
