= The Battle of Benburb =

Song

"The Battle of Benburb" is an Irish song commemorating the 1646 Battle of Benburb. The tune was composed by Tommy Makem, with the lyrics drawn from a nineteenth century poem by Robert Dwyer Joyce.

On 5 June 1646 Owen Roe O'Neill, the leader of the Ulster Army of the Irish Confederates, won a major victory over the Scottish Covenanter Army in Ireland at Benburb in County Tyrone. The fighting took place as part of the War of Three Kingdoms, with both sides pledging allegiance to Charles I while advancing distinctively Catholic and Protestants agendas in Ireland. O'Neill's troops defeated the Scots and pursued fugitives for miles, killing many of them and taking very few prisoners. This severely weakened the strength of the Scottish forces in Ulster, but O'Neill was unable to follow up his victory by attacking Carrickfergus as much of his army dispersed with their plunder.

In the mid-nineteenth century O'Neill was revived as a hero by Irish Nationalists and it was in the context of this that Joyce wrote his poem. It draws on the romantic nationalist tradition, popular across Europe at the time, and portrays Benburb as a gathering of the clans from across North and Western Ireland - referring to the various Gaelic commanders serving under O'Neill. Another song commemorating Owen Roe O'Neill "The Lament for Owen Roe" also dates from the mid-nineteenth century.
