= Battle of Clones =

Battle during the Irish Confederate Wars in 1643

Coordinates: 54.183°N 7.2337°W

- Part of the Irish Confederate Wars
Date	13 June 1643
Location	Clones, County Monaghan, Ireland
Result	Royalist victory

Belligerents
Irish Confederates	Royalists

Commanders and leaders
Owen Roe O'Neill	Sir Robert Stewart

Units involved
Ulster Army	Laggan Army

Strength
c. 1,600	c. 3,000

Casualties and losses
c. 150	29

Ireland and Clones

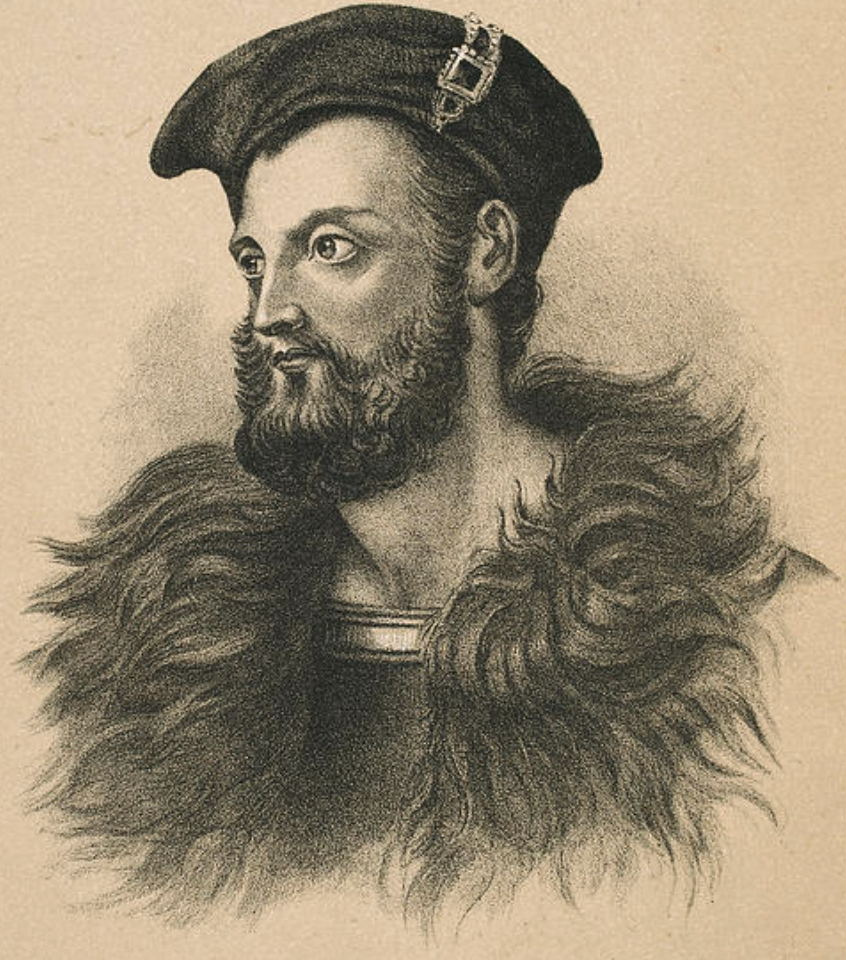
Eoghan Ruadh Ó Néill

The Battle of Clones occurred on 13 June 1643 during the Irish Confederate Wars, when Irish Confederate forces commanded by Eoghan Ruadh Ó Néill (Owen Roe O'Neill) were decisively defeated near Clones in County Monaghan by the Protestant Laggan Army commanded by Sir Robert Stewart.

== Background ==
In October 1641 the Irish Rebellion erupted in Ireland. During the early stages of the eleven years of conflict much of the fighting occurred in the northern province of Ulster between Irish Catholic Confederates and Scottish forces. After ten months of fighting with few victories, the Confederation placed Eoghan Ruadh Ó Néill, an Irish Catholic patriot and skilled military officer, in charge of their poorly trained Ulster Army hoping that he could reverse their fortunes. Ó Néill attempted to train and strengthen his army over the autumn and winter of 1642–1643 in war torn Ulster, but ultimately determined that he needed to temporarily move his fledgling force to a safer place until they were fully ready to fight.

== Belligerents ==
=== Eoghan Ruadh Ó Néill and the Irish Confederate Army ===
Eoghan Ruadh Ó Néill, born in 1585, was a descendant of ancient Irish royalty. As a young boy he grew up amidst the Irish struggles for freedom against Queen Elizabeth in the Nine Years' War. After the Irish defeat and the Treaty of Mellifont in 1603, Ó Néill did like many other young Irishmen leaving his home to participate in the Eighty Years’ War in Flanders as a part of an Irish regiment associated with the Spanish military.

Ó Néill spent over thirty years on the continent as a military officer in the service of the Spanish. During that time, he learned the art of war and earned acclaim as an excellent general, notably for his defense of Arras in 1640. He actively communicated with fellow expatriates and watched the affairs of England and Ireland with a desire of returning and participating in a rebellion. Ó Néill formed a brotherhood with his compatriots in the Irish regiment and they encouraged him to return to Ireland and lead a rebellion.

In July 1642, approximately seven months after the start of the Irish Rebellion, Ó Néill returned to Ireland with arms, munitions, and a cadre of 200 experienced soldiers and officers from the Irish regiment in Flanders. By that time, the Catholic leaders of Ireland had formed the Irish Catholic Confederation to carry on the fight that the rebels had started regarding Catholic rights. Within a two-month period, the Confederates made Ó Néill the commander of their army in Ulster. Ó Néill was expected to enhance not only recruiting, but more importantly, training and military discipline. It was the belief and expectation of the Confederates that Ó Néill would be able to create a true army in Ulster as opposed to the corps of rabble that his predecessor Sir Felim O’Neill had taken to war with disastrous results.

Ó Néill chose the stronghold of Charlemont in Ulster as his base of operations and immediately began building his army in the late summer of 1642. Also garrisoned in Ulster at that time, however, was a Scottish Covenanter expeditionary force under the command of General Robert Monro. The Scottish Covenanters had sent troops to Ireland in April with the knowledge and permission of King Charles to protect Scottish settlers. This Scottish force was headquartered at Carrickfergus and had taken control and occupied several counties in eastern Ulster. Beginning in September 1642 and continuing into the spring of 1643, the Covenanters conducted four military campaigns attempting to conquest Charlemont and destroy Ó Néill's army. During that time, Ó Néill's forces in Ulster were also harassed and attacked by the Laggan Army, an Ulster-Scots militia based in The Laggan, a district in the east of County Donegal.

Because of the threat of these attacks on his untrained army and the lack of provisions in Ulster, Ó Néill made the decision to move his troops west to the interior counties of Ireland where the countryside was controlled by the Confederates. On 9 June, Ó Néill sent messengers to his commanders throughout Ulster telling them of his plan and instructing them to rendezvous with him at Clones.

=== Sir Robert Stewart and the Laggan Army ===
At the outset of the rebellion, thousands of Protestant settlers were evicted from their lands. Their homes were burned and their possessions taken. The settlers became homeless refugees and were mercilessly hunted down and murdered by Irish rebels. Thousands of the Protestant refugees sought safety and protection in Royalist strongholds or attempted to leave Ireland and return to England and Scotland.

At that time, wealthy Protestant landowners in northwest Ulster, such as Sir William Stewart and his brother Sir Robert Stewart, chose to defend their properties by organising militias. The Stewarts were Scottish settlers who had served the English Crown in the military and were rewarded with large tracts of escheated land in Ireland during the colonisation of Ulster.

The Stewarts were held in such high regard that immediately after the outbreak of the rebellion, King Charles authorised both of the Stewarts to establish a regiment of 1,000 foot and a troop of horse for the King's service. The military force that the Stewarts created came to be known as the Laggan Army. Originally the unit was formed to protect The Laggan, a staunchly Protestant district in East Donegal, along with the northwest portions of Counties Tyrone and Londonderry. As the war progressed, the Laggan Army became the most dominant Royalist militia in Ulster, defending and relieving Protestant strongholds; escorting refugees to safe havens; conducting reprisal attacks on the Irish rebels; and supporting other Royalist militias in numerous conflicts.

William Stewart served as the nominal leader of the Laggan Army in the beginning as he had greater seniority and landed interests than his brother. Fairly quickly, however, Robert Stewart was selected for overall command based upon his extensive experience in the Thirty Years' War on the European continent. Robert Stewart was resourceful and proved to be adept at recruiting men and training military units. His troops were better equipped than the Confederates, especially with respect to muskets.

== Battle ==
Ó Néill's Ulster Army convoy was estimated to be as large as 3,100 individuals when it gathered near Clones. Included in the group were 1,600 fighting men, their families, supply wagons, baggage carts, livestock, and nomadic creaghts with their cattle herds. Of the fighting men in the group, most were untrained, poorly armed foot soldiers. The cavalry units attached to the group were small.

As the Ulster Army was traveling to Clones, Stewart learned of their movement. Upon receipt of the intelligence, Stewart assembled his force, estimated to be as large as 3,000 men including both infantry and cavalry units, and made plans to intercept Ó Néill.

Ó Néill reached Clones before the Laggan Army and continued his march to the south towards Scotshouse. As he was beginning to cross the Finn River where Cumber Bridge is now located, Ó Néill became aware that Stewart was approaching from the north. Ó Néill wanted to try and get as much of his army across the river and avoid a head-on confrontation with Stewart's army, but in a Council of War it was decided that the Irish would take defensive positions north of the river and fight the Laggan Army.

With no time to construct defensive fortifications, Ó Néill positioned his men along a stone portion of the roadway where for the most part the passage was bordered by bogs. At the narrowest portion of the roadway closest to the approach of the Laggan Army Ó Néill placed 100 musketeers. He then placed the bulk of his infantry in defensive positions along the roadway to the south.

As his infantry was getting into position, Ó Néill led a cavalry detachment north to reconnoiter the advance of Stewart's army and slow them down if possible. As he did so, Ó Néill and his small force came upon the cavalry vanguard of Stewart's army. A short clash of arms occurred with Ó Néill quickly retreating back to the safety of his army. As the Laggan Army continued to advance toward the Confederates, Stewart sent a cavalry detachment to attack Ó Néill's musketeers. Stewart's force drove off the musketeers and then retreated to prepare for a full cavalry attack upon the Irish army. Before Stewart's cavalry could coordinate their attack, Ó Néill sent his cavalry out to confront the Royalists. For a short while, the cavalry battle was a stalemate.

As the cavalry battle continued, an Irish commander, Shane Og O’Neill, ordered his brigade of infantry out of their defensive positions intending to attack the Laggan infantry. His advance was against his orders to stay in position, but nevertheless, he made the move hoping to catch the enemy's infantry off-guard. Shane O’Neill's brigade didn't reach their objective, however, as the Laggan cavalry quickly turned and attacked the Irish infantry. After approximately a half-hour of fighting, the Irish infantry began to break and retreat in disorder. At that time, Stewart pressed forward with the Laggan infantry. As the fleeing Confederates were pursued by the Royalists they collided with the remainder of their own army, creating chaos and confusion which caused all the Irish, infantry and cavalry, to flee.

Seeing what was happening, Ó Néill broke off the fighting and organized a more disciplined retreat. Many of his men continued to flee in a haphazard manner as they were pursued by the Laggan cavalry.

In the short battle, the Irish lost most of their materials and an estimated 150 men including many of the experienced officers who had returned with Ó Néill to Ireland from Flanders. Laggan Army casualties were reported to be quite low, six men killed and 23 injured.

== Aftermath ==
Many of the Irish scattered and hid in the countryside till Ó Néill was able to regroup them and press on with his march to the interior of Ireland. Stewart could not afford to leave his operations base in East Donegal unprotected and pursue Ó Néill any deeper into Ireland, so he simply confiscated the resources left behind by the Confederates and returned home. Although Ó Néill was able to replace the lost men, his timetable was significantly impacted due to the loss of the experienced officers and soldiers that he had introduced into his army from the Irish Regiment. The province of Ulster was then held totally by the enemies of the revolution – the Laggan Army, the Covenanters, and the English.

== Citations ==
- Bagwell, Richard (1909). Ireland Under the Stuarts and During the Interregnum: 1642-1660, Volume 2. London: Longmans, Green and Company.
- "Cumber Bridge, Coolnalong / Lisabuck, Monaghan". National Inventory of Architectural Heritage. Department of Housing, Local Government and Heritage.
- Gray, Boyd. "The Plantation of Ulster". electricscotland.com. Electric Scotland USA LLC.
- Hamilton, Lord Ernes (1920). The Irish Rebellion of 1641: With a History of the Events which Led Up to and Succeeded it. New York: E. P. Dutton and Company.
- "Ireland's Wars: Charlemont, Clones and Portlester". Never Felt Better. Never Felt Better. 26 June 2013.
- "Ireland's Wars: Glenmaquin". Never Felt Better. Never Felt Better. 8 May 2013.
- Kimber, Edward (1768). The Peerage of Ireland: A Genealogical and Historical Account of All the Peers of that Kingdom Etc, Volume 1. London: Almon.
- Ohlmeyer, Jane (2018). The Cambridge History of Ireland: Volume 2, 1550–1730. Cambridge: Cambridge University Press. ISBN 9781108592277.
- Mórdha, P. B. Ó. (1962). "The Battle of Clones, 1643". Clogher Record. 4 (3): 148–154. doi:10.2307/27695516. JSTOR 27695516.
- Plant, David. "The Confederate War: Campaigns of 1643-4". BCW Project. David Plant.
- Stevenson, David (2005). Scottish Covenanters and Irish Confederates: Scottish-Irish Relations in the Mid-Seventeenth Century. Belfast: Ulster Historical Foundation. ISBN 9781903688465.
- Taylor, J. F. (1896). Owen Roe O'Neill. London: T. Fisher Unwin.
- Wills, James (1841). Lives of Illustrious and Distinguished Irishmen (Vol. III ed.). Dublin: Macgregor, Polson.

== General references ==
- "Battle of Clones, 1643". Ulster Journal of Archaeology. 1903.
- Casway, Jerrold (1896), Owen Roe O'Neill and the Struggle for Catholic Ireland, Philadelphia: University of Pennsylvania, ISBN 081227895X
- Ohlmeyer, Jane H., ed. (2002). Ireland from Independence to Occupation, 1641-1660. Cambridge: Cambridge University Press. ISBN 9780521522755.
