= The Lament for Owen Roe =

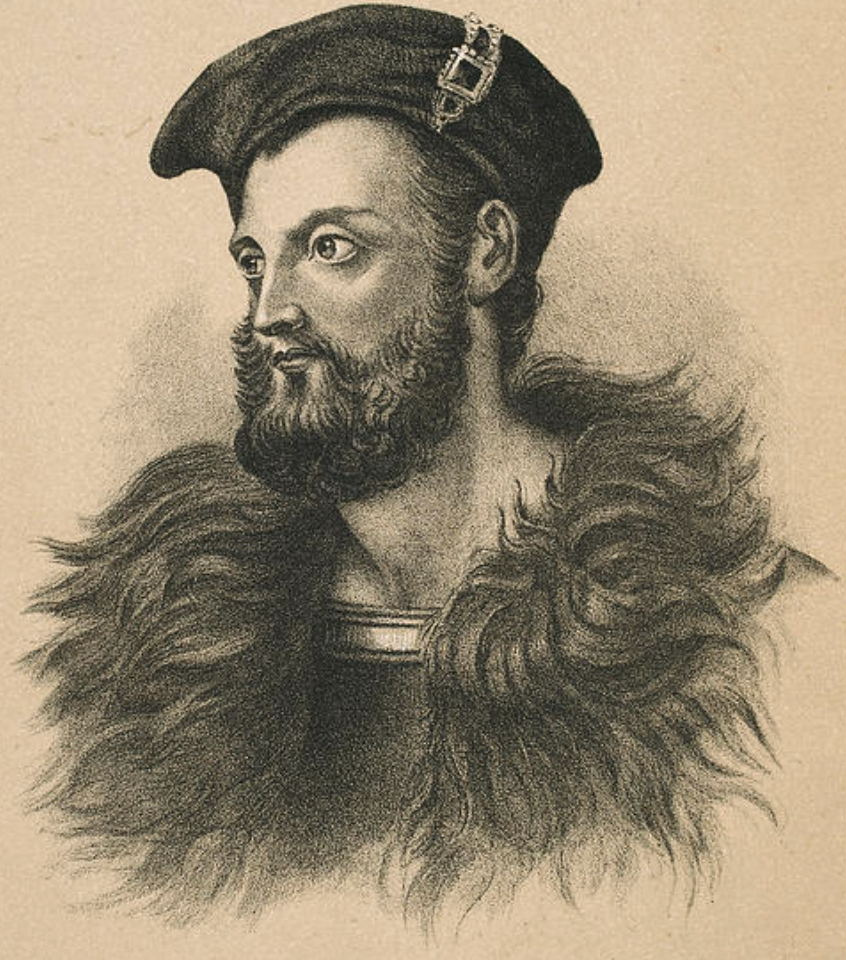
Lithograph copy of a contemporary painting of Owen Roe O'Neill, subject of the Ballad.

"The Lament for Owen Roe" is a traditional Irish ballad dating from the nineteenth century. With a mournful tune, based on an eighteenth-century composition called Lament for Owen Roe O'Neill by the harpist Turlough O'Carolan, it is a lament for the death of Owen Roe O'Neill. Its lyrics were written by Thomas Davis and draw on the tradition of romantic nationalism which was at its height during the era.

== Background ==
Owen Roe O'Neill (c.1585-1649), a member of the O'Neill dynasty of Ulster, was a veteran soldier who had spent most of his life serving as a mercenary in the Spanish Army. Following the Irish Rebellion of 1641 in which Catholics rose up to assert their rights while pledging their allegiance to Charles I, O'Neill returned to Ireland. During the ensuing Irish Confederate Wars he commanded the Ulster Army, mostly campaigning against the Scottish Covenanter Army whom he defeated at the Battle of Benburb. Following the execution of Charles I in 1649 and the declaration of the English Commonwealth, the Irish Confederates and the Covenanters united in a new alliance under his son Charles II. In the face of a potential landing by a large expedition of English troops, O'Neill quarreled with his rival Catholic commanders and refused to accept the Treaty. He instead began co-operation with local English troops under Sir Charles Coote, assisting them during the Siege of Derry.

His temporary alliance with the English having broken down, O'Neill now reached agreement with the Crown including amongst his conditions an Earldom and some lands once held by his family. However he died shortly afterwards. Rumours rapidly spread that he had been poisoned by the English republican forces of Oliver Cromwell (and in particular by O'Neill's recent former ally Coote) to remove a dangerous opponent. However the idea that O'Neill was assassinated is now generally rejected, and his death attributed to natural causes. After his death the Ulster Army was largely destroyed at the Battle of Scarrifholis.

== Song ==
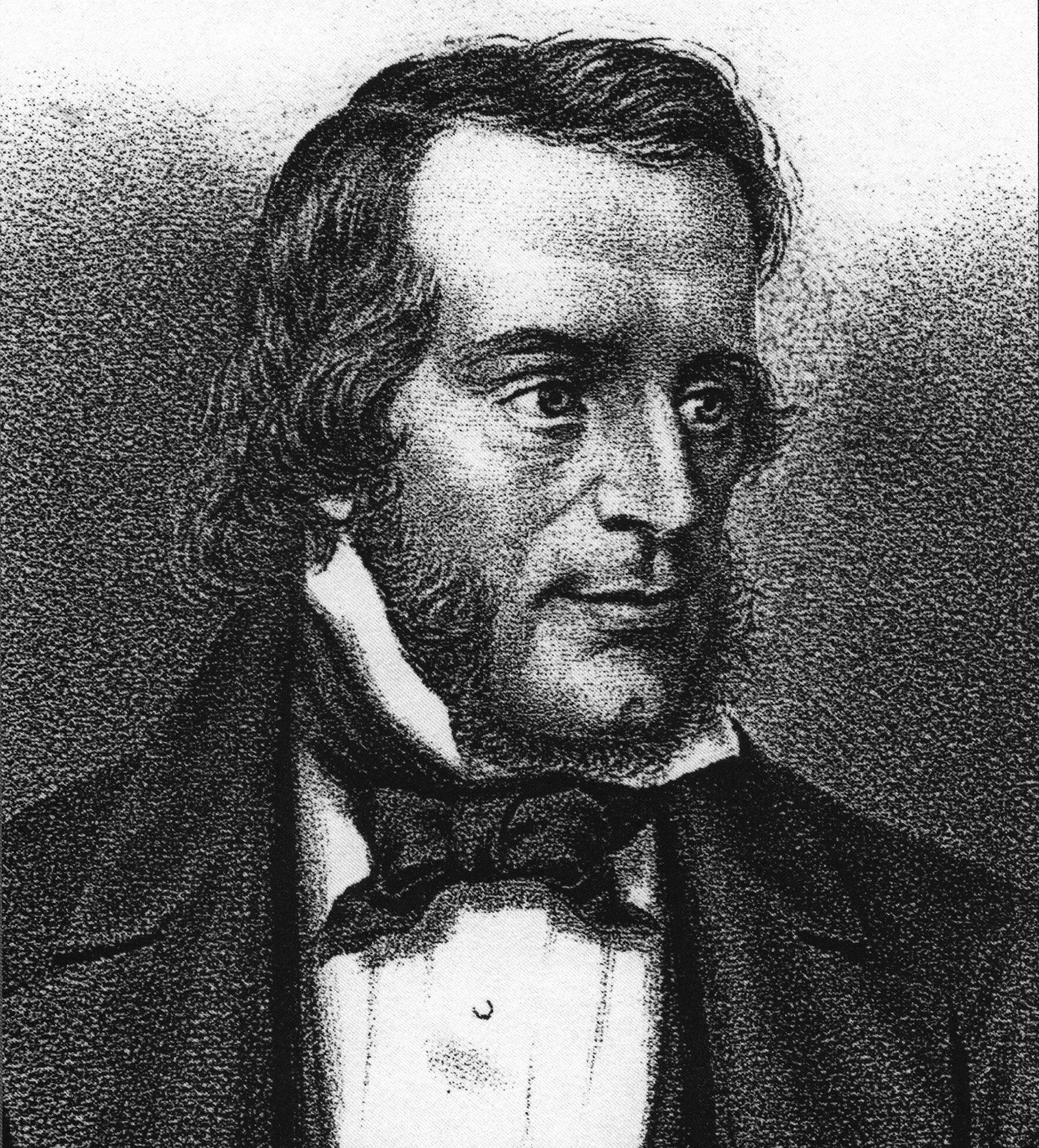
Thomas Davis of the Young Ireland movement.

Among his many works, Turlough O'Carolan composed several tunes that referred to Irish leaders during the Confederate Wars, including Lord Inchiquin and Owen Roe. During the nineteenth century, Owen Roe was revived as a heroic figure by Irish nationalists. Thomas Davis of the Young Ireland movement included him along with other seventeenth century figures such as Red Hugh O'Donnell and Patrick Sarsfield who were represented, often rather anachronistically, as part of a general Irish nationalist movement that stretched back for centuries.

The song is sung from the perspective of one of O'Neill's followers in another part of Ireland, who hears the news of his death. It strongly endorses the idea that O'Neill was murdered and attributes his loss as the main reason for the catastrophic defeat to the English republicans under Oliver Cromwell, who occupied Ireland for the next decade, and deprived many Catholic leaders of their lands in the 1652 Act of Settlement.

Ludwig van Beethoven wrote an arrangement of The Lament as part of his "Ode to Irish Airs" collection. William Butler Yeats was an admirer of the ballad.

Its original tune is often played as an instrumental version without the later words. Another song commemorating O'Neill "The Battle of Benburb" also dates from the nineteenth century.

== Bibliography ==
- Casway, Jerrold. Owen Roe O'Neill and the Struggle for Catholic Ireland. University of Pennsylvania Press, 1984.
- Cooper, Barry. Beethoven. Oxford University Press, 2000.
- Foster, Robert Fitzroy. Words Alone: Yeats and His Inheritances. Oxford University Press, 2011.
- Stafford, Fiona J. From Gaelic to Romantic: Ossianic Translations. Rodopi, 1998.
