= Siege of Arras (1640) =

Siege during the Franco-Spanish War

- Part of Franco-Spanish War (1635–59)
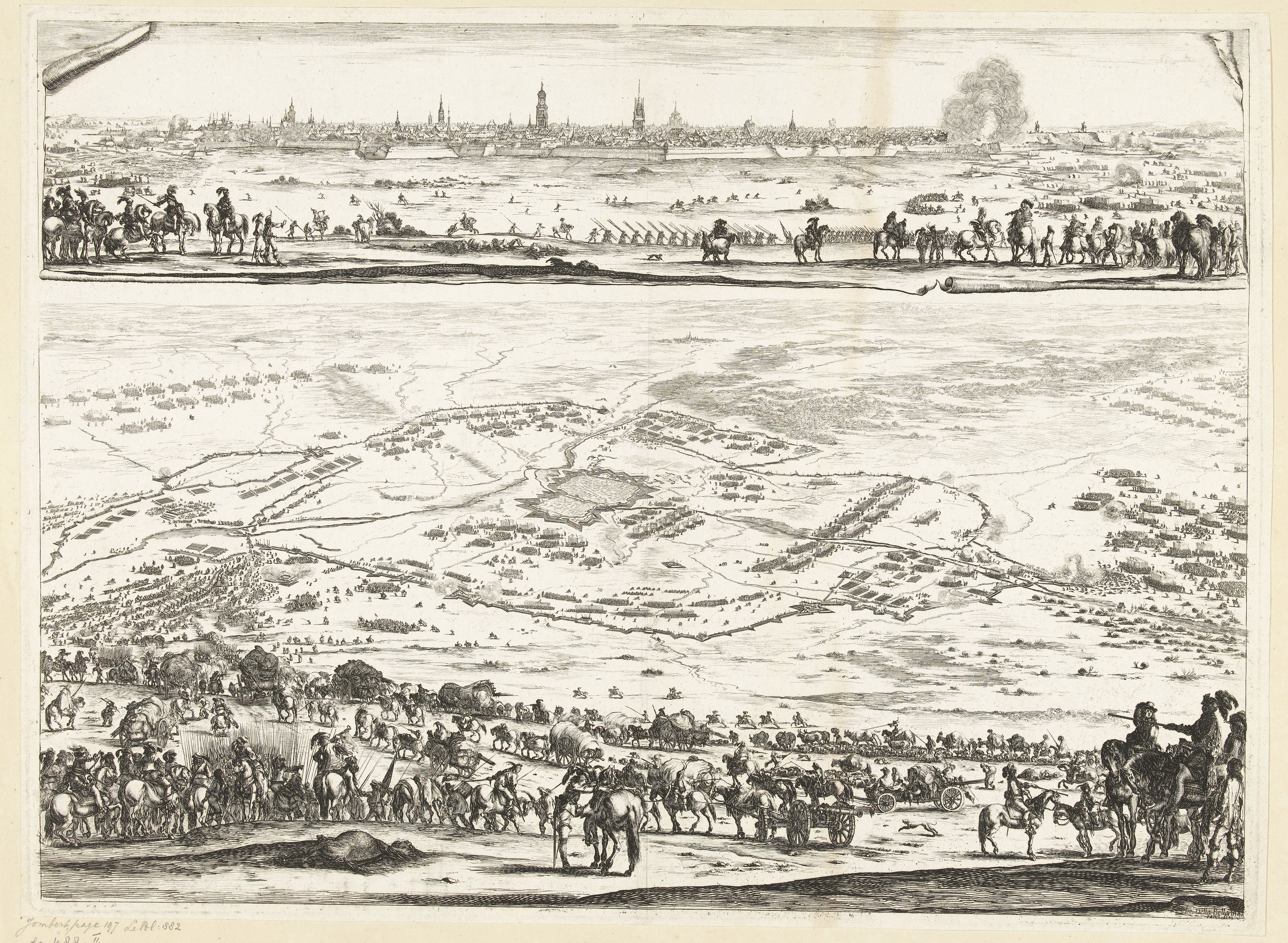
| Date | 22 June – 9 August 1640 |
| Location | Arras, France, then part of the Spanish Netherlands |
| Result | French victory |

Belligerents
| France | Spain · Irish Soldiers |

Commanders and leaders
| (Kingdom of France) Gaspar de Châtillon (Kingdom of France) Honoré d'Chaulnes (Kingdom of France) Charles de La Porte | (Spain) Owen Roe O'Neill |

Strength
| 32,000 | 2,000 |

Casualties and losses
| Unknown | Minimal |

The siege of Arras took place from 22 June to 9 August 1640, during the Franco-Spanish War that had begun in 1635, a connected conflict of the Thirty Years' War. A French army besieged the Spanish-held town of Arras, capital of the province of Artois, then part of the Spanish Netherlands, which surrendered after holding out for 48 days.

Arras was held by a garrison of 2,000, commanded by Owen Roe O'Neill, an Irish exile in Spanish service. Despite a counter-blockade by a Spanish field army under Charles of Lorraine, which brought the French to near starvation, they were eventually resupplied, and the garrison surrendered on 9 August.

Ceded to France in the 1659 Treaty of the Pyrenees, Arras has remained part of France ever since. The siege is also notable for the participation of French poet and playwright Cyrano de Bergerac, who was wounded on 8 August in a Spanish attack.

== Background ==
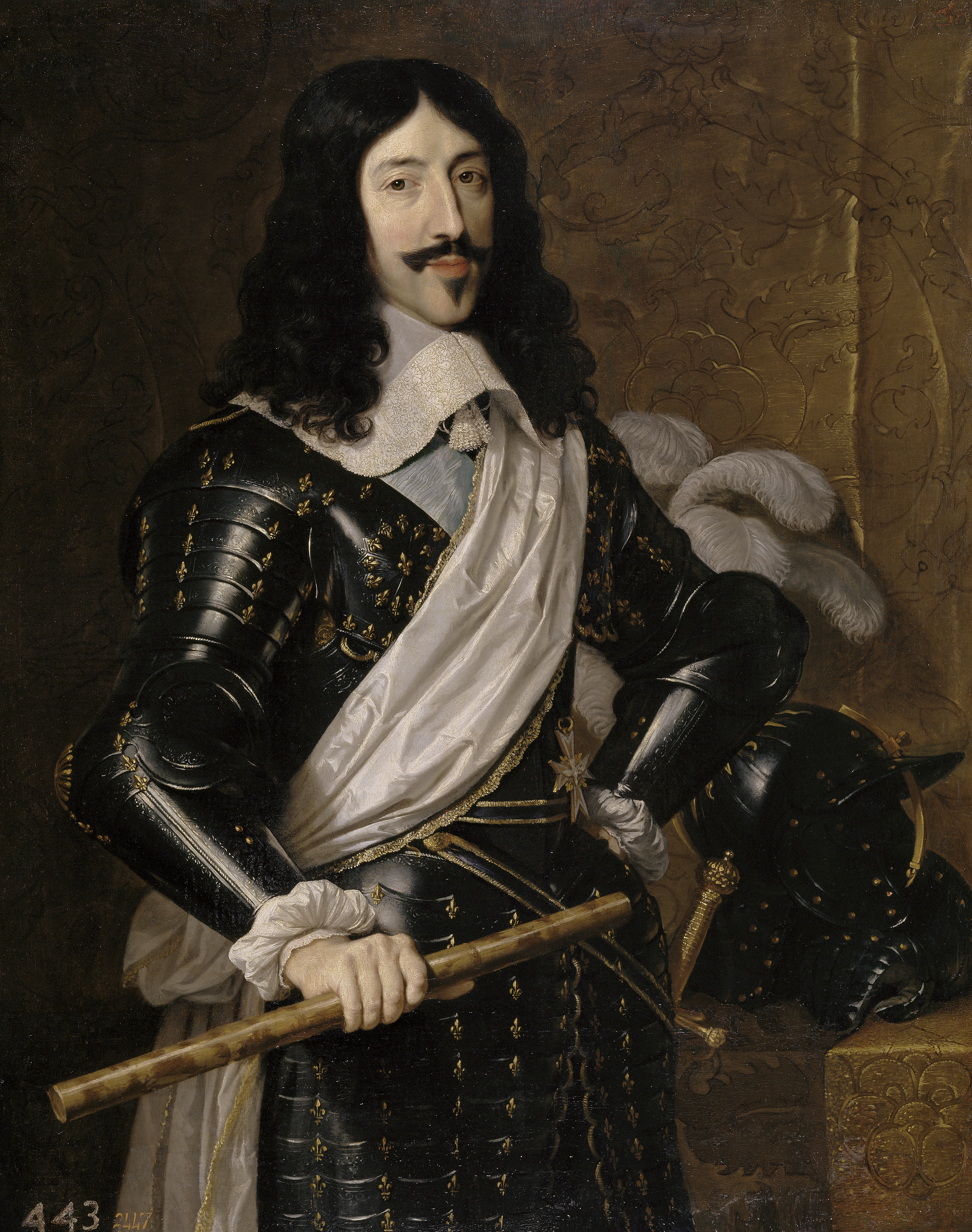
Louis XIII, French ruler from 1610 to 1643

Seventeenth-century Europe was dominated by the struggle between the Bourbon kings of France, and their Habsburg rivals in Spain and the Holy Roman Empire. In 1938, historian CV Wedgwood argued the Thirty Years War (1618-48) and the Dutch Revolt (1568-1648) formed part of a wider, ongoing European struggle, with the Habsburg-Bourbon conflict at its centre. This interpretation is generally accepted by modern historians, and makes the Franco-Spanish War a connected conflict; this wider perspective helps in understanding strategic objectives.

Habsburg territories in the Spanish Netherlands, Franche-Comté, and the Pyrenees blocked French expansion and made it vulnerable to invasion. Occupied by domestic Huguenot rebellions from 1621 to 1629, France looked for opportunities to weaken the Habsburgs, while avoiding direct conflict. This included supporting the Dutch against Spain, and financing Swedish intervention in the Empire, starting in 1630, when Gustavus Adolphus of Sweden invaded Pomerania.

When Spain restarted its war of reconquest against the Dutch in 1621 at the end of the Twelve Years' Truce, it initially won a series of victories, but by 1633 found itself on the retreat again. The powerful Amsterdam mercantile lobby saw this as an opportunity to end the war on favourable terms, and although negotiations ended without result, the Dutch peace party grew in strength. At the same time, defeat at Nördlingen in September 1634 forced the Swedes to retreat, while most of their German allies left the war after the 1635 Treaty of Prague.

Concerned by the prospect of the Habsburgs making peace on favourable terms in both the Empire and the Netherlands, Louis XIII and his chief minister Richelieu decided on direct intervention. In February 1635, France signed an alliance with the Dutch, agreeing to divide the Spanish Netherlands and in April, the Treaty of Compiègne with Sweden. In the first three years of the war, the veteran Spanish army won a series of victories over the French. However, in 1638 the French and Dutch simultaneously attacked the Spanish Netherlands, from both north and south; while this offensive was unsuccessful, it put the Spanish on the defensive. After capturing Hesdin in 1639, the French objective for 1640 was the town of Arras, capital of Artois.

== Siege ==
1640 campaign in Artois

Arras was strongly held, and its fortifications recently updated, but its most formidable defences were the four waterways running around the town, making it hard for besiegers to blockade it, while complicating their communications and logistics. To weaken the garrison, a French force under de Châtillon moved against the smaller towns of Aire-sur-la-Lys and Béthune, forcing the Spanish to send troops from Arras to reinforce them.

This achieved, de Châtillon linked up with de Chaulnes and de la Meilleraye, and their combined army of 32,000 men marched on Arras. The garrison now consisted of around 2,000 men, commanded by Owen Roe O'Neill, an exiled Irish veteran who had served in the Spanish army for many years.

The biggest difficulty the French faced was feeding so large an army; rather than attacking, the Spanish field army under Charles of Lorraine focused on preventing supplies reaching them. By July, the French were shorter of food than the garrison, and could either retreat, or attack Charles of Lorraine on ground of his own choosing.

Richelieu was based nearby at Doullens; when his commanders presented these choices, he warned they would "pay with their heads" if Arras was not taken. However, he also sent a large convoy of supplies under François de L'Hospital, which arrived in the French camp on 2 August. With the garrison reduced to eating rats, it was clear they could not hold much longer, while Charles of Lorraine was ordered not to risk their field army.

On August 8, with the French close to breaching the eastern wall, O'Neill launched a sortie in an unsuccessful effort to break the French lines, during which Cyrano de Bergerac, the French poet and playwright, was wounded. The next day, O'Neill surrendered; his troops were given a free pass to Lille, accompanied by thousands of civilians.

== Aftermath ==
The French quickly over-ran the rest of Artois, but more importantly, Spain was finding it increasingly difficult to sustain war on so many fronts. Throughout the 1630s, there were protests at attempts by Madrid to increase taxes; in 1640, this led to revolts in Portugal and Catalonia. Many Spanish officials also felt it was time to accept Dutch independence, but despite these challenges, Spain supported by the Austrian Habsburgs remained a formidable power. The Kingdom of Spain formally recognised the independence of the Dutch Republic with the Peace of Münster, signed on 30 January 1648.

== Sources ==
- De Périni, Hardÿ (1896). Batailles françaises (in French). Vol. III. Ernest Flammarion, Paris.
- Hayden, J Michael (1973). "Continuity in the France of Henry IV and Louis XIII: French Foreign Policy, 1598–1615". The Journal of Modern History. 45 (1): 1–23. doi:10.1086/240888. JSTOR 1877591. S2CID 144914347.
- Israel, Jonathan (1995). Spain in the Low Countries, (1635–1643) in Spain, Europe and the Atlantic: Essays in Honour of John H. Elliott. Cambridge University Press. ISBN 978-0-521-47045-2.
- Knox, Bill (2017). "The 1635 Treaty of Prague; A Failed Settlement?". In Tucker, Spencer (ed.). Enduring Controversies in Military History: Critical Analyses and Context. Vol. I. Greenwood Press. ISBN 978-1-4408-4119-4.
- Poot, Anton (2013). Crucial years in Anglo-Dutch relations (1625–1642): The Political and Diplomatic Contacts. Uitgeverij Verloren. ISBN 978-9-08-704380-3.
- "Siege of Arras, 1640". Fortified Places.
- Sutherland, N. M. (1992). "The Origins of the Thirty Years War and the Structure of European Politics". English Historical Review. 107 (424). ISSN 0013-8266.
- Van Gelderen, Martin (2002). Republicanism and Constitutionalism in Early Modern Europe: A Shared European Heritage Volume I. Cambridge University Press. ISBN 978-0-521-80203-1.
- Wedgwood, C. V. (2005) [1938]. The Thirty Years War (2005 ed.). New York Review of Books. ISBN 978-1590171462.
- Wilson, Charles (1976). Transformation of Europe, 1558–1648. Littlehampton Book Services. ISBN 978-0-297-77015-2.
