= Siege of Clonmel =

1650 siege in Cromwell's conquest of Ireland

Coordinates: 52.3539°N 7.7117°W

- Part of the Cromwellian Conquest of Ireland
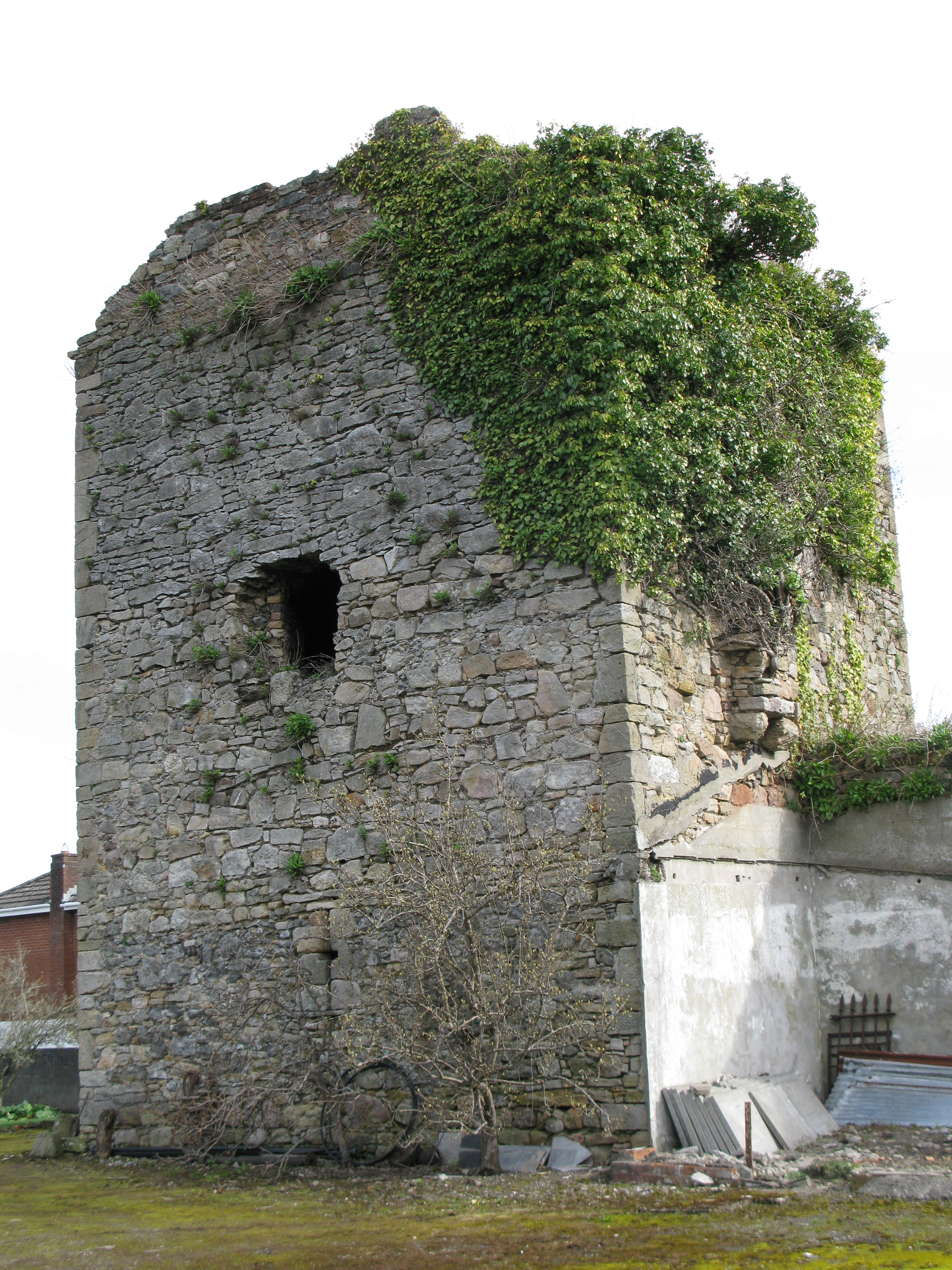
- One of the remaining towers, part of the western defensive wall at the time of the siege.
| Date | 27 April to 18 May 1650 (3 weeks) |
| Location | Clonmel, County Tipperary |
| Result | Costly English victory |

Belligerents
| Irish Confederation | Commonwealth of England |

Commanders and leaders
| Hugh O'Neill | Oliver Cromwell |

Strength
| 1,500 | 8,000 |

Casualties and losses
| Several hundred | Up to 2,000 |

Ireland and Clonmel

The siege of Clonmel, from 27 April to 18 May 1650, took place during the Cromwellian conquest of Ireland, when Clonmel in County Tipperary was besieged by 8,000 men from the New Model Army under Oliver Cromwell. The garrison of 1,500 commanded by Hugh Dubh O'Neill eventually surrendered after inflicting heavy casualties on the besiegers.

O'Neill escaped with some of his troops, but although the Irish Confederate Wars continued until 1653, Clonmel ended effective Royalist resistance in Ireland, (Note: Cromwell faced an uneasy alliance between the Irish Catholic Confederation, exiled English Royalists and Irish Protestant Royalists, most of whom defected after Clonmel) and Cromwell returned to England immediately afterwards.

== Background ==
The garrison at Clonmel changed as the arrival of the New Model Army through Kilkenny became imminent. In November 1649, the town's Mayor John Bennet White wrote to the Duke of Ormond seeking military assistance. Colonel Oliver Stephenson and part of the old Confederate army, mostly from County Clare, took up quarters. The southern Confederates were not fully trusted by the townspeople, particularly after the fall of Carrick on Suir due to treachery. Ormond arrived in person at the end of the month and the Clare men were replaced by experienced soldiers from Ulster under O'Neill, a veteran of siege warfare in the Thirty Years' War. Under his command were 1,500 soldiers from the Irish Ulster army, mostly from the modern counties of Tyrone and Cavan. These two regiments had served under Owen Roe O'Neill and were now led by his nephew. They were accompanied by two troops of cavalry under Colonel Edmond Fennell of Ballygriffin, County Cork. O'Neill sent reinforcements to some outlying fortifications at Ballydine, Kilcash and 'Castle Caonagh' (Mountain Castle). Even before the siege commenced, provisioning the new influx was causing difficulties, Ormond proving unable to adequately supply them. As other walled towns in the vicinity capitulated with little resistance, tension in the town rose as evidenced by correspondence between O'Neill and Ormond.

May it please your Excellencie.

This day I received your letter of the 25th of this instant [February]. Since my last letter to your Excie. I have not to intimate more than that Cahir was yielded without shot or blowe upon what conditions I knowe not, which I believe your Excie knows ere nowe, likewise Kilteenan was beseedged eare yesternight and yielded yesterdaye morninge about nyne of the clocke. All their armye is within a myle to the towne, and the rest are cominge to them, in great hast they have sent a number of horse and oxen for more cannons. Wee expect nothinge else but bee besieged every houre they having nowe noe other place to ayme at but this. Your Excie may knowe in what condicon wee are and the consequence of this place to the Kingdom which requires a speedy succour all which I humbly referre to your Lordshipps grave consideratacon I humbly take leave and remayne
Your Excies most humble servt,
Hugo O'Neill
Clonmell ultimo [28th] February

To which Ormond responded in the following terms :

Sir – Your letter of the last of February intimating your expectation of suddainly besieged I received not till about nine of the clock this morning. In answeare whereunto I thinke fitt to assure you by these that rather then that towne should fall into the hands of the rebels I shall draw all the forces of the Kingdome into a body for its reliefe which I shall endeavour soe to effect as in ten dayes to be in a readiness to advance to towards you, relying on your uttermost endeavours to defend that place during that tyme though you should as you expect be closely besieged and soe deseiring to heare as frequently from you as possibly you may.

I remaine
Your very affectionate friend, Ormond.
Ennis 5 March about 12 in the forenoone.

Cromwell was in a hurry to take the town as he had been summoned back to England by Parliament to deal with a Royalist uprising there. As a result, he tried to take Clonmel immediately by assault, rather than opt for a lengthy siege.

== Assault ==
Cromwell's artillery, positioned on a hill near present-day Melview, battered a breach in the town walls. It was intended that his infantry would storm this breach and then open the nearby North town gate to allow access to Cromwell and the Parliamentarian cavalry. (Note: A plaque on the "Piper Inn" locates the North (Breech) gate approximately at the junction of William St. and Catherine St.)

However, O'Neill put all able-bodied townspeople to work building a coupure inside the breach lined with artillery, muskets, and pikemen. The coupure was V-shaped, starting at the mouth of the breach and narrowing until it ended about 50 metres inside the town. At the end of the breach, O'Neill positioned two cannon, loaded with chain-shot. The area behind the breach became, in military terms, a "killing field". The Parliamentarian infantry which assaulted the breach was engaged by pikemen and repeatedly cut down by marksmen on the earthworks behind until the soldiers finally refused to make any further attacks on what was a death trap. Cromwell then appealed to his elite cavalry, the Ironsides to make a fresh assault on foot. This time the Irish allowed them to enter at first without resistance.

A British officer of Sir John Clotworthy's regiment described the entry of the Ironsides into the town, the bulk of them belonging to Ireton's regiment.

They entered without any opposition and but few were to be seen in the town till they so entered, that the lane was crammed full with horsemen armed with helmets, back breastswords, musquetoons, and pistols. On which those in front seeing themselves in a pound and could not make their way further cryed out "Halt Halt!" On which those entering behind at the breach thought by those words that all those of the garrison were running away cryed out "Advance Advance" as fast as those before cryed out "Halt Halt" and so advanced until they thrust forward those before them till that pound or lane was full and could hold no more.

Then suddenly rushes a resolute party of pikes and musqueteers to the breach and scoured off and knocked back those entering. On which instance Hugh Duff's men within fell on those in the pound with shotts, pikes, scythes, stones and casting of great long pieces of timber with the engines amongst them and then two guns firing at them from the end of the pound, slaughtering them by the middle or knees with chained bullets that in less than an hours time about a thousand men were killed in that pound being a top one another. (Note: The Irish give a similar account (Burke 1907, p. 77 citing Aphorismical Discovery p. 78): Cromwell determined to loose all at once or win the garland. Commandinge therefore both horse and foot pell mell that such a heape in such an occasion was seldome scene that by the very thronge severall of them perished, advancinge forwarde unawares (both opposition and assaulte being soe furious and hott) not observinge either ditche or counterscarfe fell headlonge into the said ditche from whence there was no redemption or possibilitie of recoverie but there were massacred and butchered. Their seconds and comrades seinge what hapned, retired, neither the threats of the Generall nor the bloudie sworde of inferiour officers was sufficient enough to keepe them from turning tayle to the assaulte and turned to the campe leavinge Major generall O'Neylle in the possession of a bloudie wall.)

Cromwell was with a second assault force waiting for the town North (or Lough) gate to be opened by the party that had stormed the breach. When he saw that the initial assault had failed and that as night was approaching, even if the disheartened soldiers could be persuaded to enter the breach once more, he judged that it would be futile against the internal defences without artillery support so he decided to end the assault for the day.

== Surrender ==
Cromwell knew that O'Neill's garrison and supplies were severely depleted and planned the next morning to try a fresh assault with close artillery support to batter the coupure and its defenders. However, O'Neill's men were out of ammunition and slipped away under the cover of darkness – making their way to Waterford. Cromwell negotiated a surrender with the town's mayor, John White, believing that Clonmel was still heavily defended. The surrender terms stipulated that the lives and property of the townspeople would be respected. After agreeing to the surrender terms, Cromwell found out that O'Neill and the Confederates had slipped away and that he had been deceived. Although he was angry, Cromwell made his men abide by the terms of the surrender agreement and treat the townspeople and their property with respect.

== Aftermath ==
After five weeks of close investment and nearly three months since the first elements of the New Model Army appeared before the town the New Model Army's losses were between 2,000 and 2,500, with hundreds more wounded, its largest ever loss in a single action.

== See also ==
- Wars of the Three Kingdoms
- Irish battles

== Sources ==
- Burke, William P. (1907), "The siege of Clonmel", History of Clonmel, The Clonmel Library Committee
- Plant, David (28 February 2008). "The siege of Clonmel, 1650". BCW Project. David Plant.
- Royle, Trevor (2004). Civil War: The Wars of the Three Kingdoms 1638–1660 (2006 ed.). Abacus. ISBN 978-0-349-11564-1.

== General references ==
- "Clonmel: Its Monastery, and Siege by Cromwell". Duffy's Hibernian Magazine. III (14). August 1861.
- A Contemporary History of Affairs in Ireland, from 1641 to 1652 includes the Aphorismical discovery of treasonable faction, History of affairs in Ireland, from 1641 to 1652, Dublin: The Irish Archaeological and Centic Society, 1879, p. 78, OL 7147266M
- Ellis, Peter Berresford (2007). Eyewitness to Irish History. Wiley. ISBN 9780470053126.
- Hogan, Edmund (1873), The history of the warr of Ireland from 1641 to 1653. By a British officer, of the regiment of Sir John Clottworthy. Ed. with preface, notes, and appendix, by E. H., Dublin: McGlashan & Gill
- McDonnell, Randall William (1906). When Cromwell came to Drogheda : a memory of 1649. Dublin. Chapter XIX Note: This is a "historical novel," and not a contemporary eyewitness account.
