= Owen Roe O'Neill =

Irish soldier (c. 1585 – 1649)

Owen Roe O'Neill Eoghan Ruadh Ó Néill
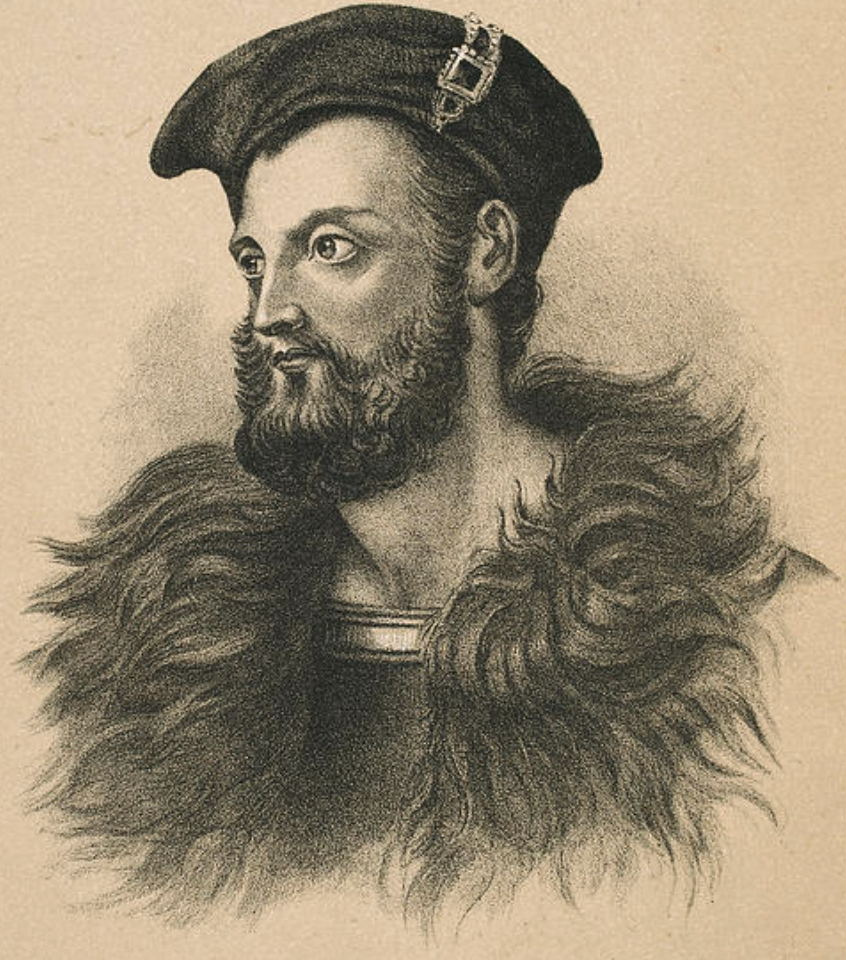
- Lithograph copy of a contemporary painting of O'Neill
- Born: c. 1585; County Armagh, Kingdom of Ireland
- Died: 6 November 1649 (aged 63–64); Cloughoughter Castle, County Cavan, Kingdom of Ireland
- Resting place: The Abbey, Cavan, Ireland
- Other name: Eoghan Ruadh Ó Néill
- Occupations: Mercenary, soldier
- Title: Commander of the Ulster Army
- Predecessor: Sir Felim O'Neill of Kinard
- Successor: Bishop Heber MacMahon
- Spouse: Rosa O'Neill
- Parent: Art MacBaron O'Neill
- Military career
- Allegiance: Spanish Empire; Confederate Ireland
- Known for: Irish general
- Conflicts: Nine Years War (Ireland); Eighty Years’ War; Spinola's campaign of 1605–1606; Siege of Rheinberg; Siege of Bergen op Zoom (1622); Siege of Breda (1624); Franco-Spanish War (1635-1659); Siege of Arras (1640); Siege of Aire-sur-la-Lys; Irish Confederate Wars; Battle of Clones; Battle of Portlester; Battle of Benburb; Battle of Dungans Hill

Owen Roe O'Neill (Irish: Eoghan Ruadh Ó Néill; c. 1585 – 6 November 1649) was a Gaelic Irish soldier and one of the most famous of the O'Neill dynasty of Ulster. O'Neill left Ireland at a young age and spent most of his life as a mercenary in the Spanish Army serving against the Dutch in Flanders during the Eighty Years' War. After the Irish Rebellion of 1641, O'Neill returned and took command of the Irish Confederate Ulster Army. He is known for his victory at the Battle of Benburb in 1646.

O'Neill's later years were marked by infighting amongst the Confederates, and in 1647 he led his army to seize power in the capital of Kilkenny. His troops clashed with rival forces of the Confederacy, leading to O'Neill forming a temporary alliance with Charles Coote's English Parliamentary forces in Ulster. He initially rejected a treaty of alliance between the Confederates and the Irish Royalists, but faced with the Cromwellian invasion he changed his mind. O'Neill died shortly after agreeing to an alliance with the 1st Marquess of Ormond, the Lord Lieutenant of Ireland. The agreement included the promise of an Earldom, but O'Neill died on Tuesday, 6 November 1649.

== Early life ==
O'Neill was the illegitimate son of Art MacBaron O'Neill, a son of Matthew O'Neill, 1st Baron Dungannon and younger half-brother of Hugh O'Neill, Earl of Tyrone, who held lands in County Armagh. His alleged great-grandfather was Conn O'Neill, 1st Earl of Tyrone, the most powerful figure in Ulster and the first O'Neill to take a title from the Crown as part of the surrender and regrant policy of the Tudor era. Through Conn, he was descended from Thomas FitzGerald, 7th Earl of Kildare, the leading Anglo-Irish noble of the era, member of the Earls of Kildare, who more or less ruled Ireland in the 15th and early 16th centuries.

His year of birth is unknown but was likely to have been around 1585. It is also not known exactly where he was born, but it was probably near Loughgall in County Armagh where his father's estates were and where O'Neill spent much of his youth. His mother was the daughter of Hugh Connolly O'Reilly, lord of Breifne O'Reilly in County Cavan.

O'Neill was educated by Franciscan monks who not only taught him Latin but also the art of war. He later fought against the English in the Nine Years' War, with the Irish war effort led by his great-uncle Hugh O'Neill. He would have been only a teen at the time and it is unknown what his role would have been, but it may have fueled his deep hatred for the English later in his life.

Several of his elder brothers also took part in the rebellion, some of whom died fighting. Another, Brian MacArt O'Neill, was hanged for manslaughter in 1607. One of his nephews was Daniel O'Neill, a Protestant who became a noted cavalier in England during the 1640s. Another of his nephews, Hugh Dubh O'Neill fought in the Confederate Wars and famously inflicted heavy casualties on Oliver Cromwell's New Model Army during the Siege of Clonmel in 1650.

== In Spanish Service ==
As a young man, O'Neill left Ireland (likely in 1607 during the Flight of the Earls). He grew up in the Spanish Netherlands and served for 40 years in the Irish regiment of the Spanish army. Most of his combat was in the Eighty Years' War against the Dutch Republic in Flanders and against the French in the Franco-Spanish War. He distinguished himself notably at the Siege of Arras in 1640, where he commanded the Spanish garrison and held out for 48 days with 2,000 men (many of whom were fellow Irishmen), against a French army of 35,000. Throughout his career O'Neill was known to be an expert in defensive warfare.

Like many Irish officers in Spanish service, O'Neill was deeply opposed to English rule in Ireland. In 1627, he was involved in petitioning the Spanish monarchy to invade Ireland using the Irish Spanish regiments. O'Neill proposed that Ireland be made a republic under Spanish protection to avoid in-fighting between Irish Catholic landed families over which of them would provide a prince or king of Ireland. This plan came to nothing.

However, in 1642, O'Neill planned to return to Ireland with 300 veterans to aid the Irish Rebellion of 1641, apparently at the invitation of one of the organizers of the rebellion Rory O'Moore. He was given money by the Pope, with which he bought a frigate, the St. Francis, and also purchased weapons and cannons to arm the ships. The ship, often described as the flagship of the Confederate naval forces during the war, was the first to fly the Confederate flag. He was joined by several of his countrymen and his sons. They managed to evade several Royal Navy vessels, which were specially deployed to intercept O'Neill. Upon landing in Ulster he was met by Sir Felim O'Neill who escorted him to the Irish-held fort of Charlemont.

Twelve more ships from continental Europe carrying experienced Irish officers along with weapons and supplies for the Irish war effort would land in Ireland later, reviving the rebellion, and adding considerable knowledge and experience to the Catholic ranks, which would prove extremely valuable.

== Return to Ireland ==
The rebellion had broken out in autumn 1641, with the rebel leaders issuing the Proclamation of Dungannon declaring their aim of enhancing Catholic rights while declaring their continued loyalty to King Charles I. Despite a failed attempt to seize Dublin Castle, the rebels enjoyed success across Ulster, and the uprising spread to other parts of the country. However, the rebels then suffered several defeats to the Royal Irish Army and the Scottish Covenanter Army in Ireland and by the time Eoghan Rua arrived, the rising was increasingly in trouble.

The Green harp flag, stated as being used by O'Neill in 1642

The subsequent war, known as the Irish Confederate Wars, was part of the Wars of the Three Kingdoms—civil wars throughout Britain and Ireland. Because of his military experience, O'Neill was recognised on his return to Ireland, at Doe Castle in County Donegal on 8 July 1642, as the leading representative of the O'Neills and head of the Ulster Irish. Sir Phelim O'Neill resigned the northern command of the Irish rebellion in Eoghan Rua's favour and escorted him from Lough Swilly to Charlemont.

Upon arrival in Ireland, he received a letter from an English parliamentarian general by the name of Leslie, telling O'Neill that he was sad O'Neill, as an experienced officer, was committing himself to such a cause and that he should return to Spain. O'Neill responded that his cause in Ireland was far more honourable than an English general fighting against his own King.

But distrust between the kinsmen was complicated by differences between Owen Roe O'Neill and the Catholic Confederation which met at Kilkenny in October 1642. Phelim professed to be acting in the interest of Charles I; O'Neill's aim was complete independence of Ireland as a Catholic country, while the Old English Catholics represented by the council desired to secure religious liberty and an Irish constitution under English rule. O'Neill wanted the Plantation of Ulster overturned and the recovery of the O'Neill dynasty's lands. The majority of Confederate military resources were directed to Thomas Preston's Leinster Army. Preston, an Old English Catholic, was also a Spanish veteran but he and O'Neill had an intense personal dislike of each other.

Mainly because Preston had been given the available military resources, O'Neill was outnumbered by the Scottish Covenanter army that had landed in Ulster in 1642. He did, however, have a large number of experienced officers who had travelled with him from Flanders. The Irish Ulster Army, including regiments under Rory Maguire, was poorly trained and undisciplined, so O'Neill set out to transform the army into a respectable force. Following a defeat at the Battle of Clones, O'Neill had to abandon central Ulster and was followed by thousands of refugees, fleeing the revenge of the Scottish soldiers who inflicted terrible attacks on Irish civilians, persuaded by Protestant propaganda alleging atrocities against Anglo-Scottish settlers in the rebellion of 1641. To O'Neill, the devastation of Ulster made it look, "not only like a desert, but like hell, if hell could exist on earth". O'Neill stopped the killings of Protestant civilians, for which he received the gratitude of many Protestant settlers. From 1642 to 1646, a stalemate existed in Ulster, which O'Neill used to train and discipline his Ulster Army. This poorly supplied force nevertheless gained a bad reputation for plundering and robbing friendly civilians around its quarters in northern Leinster and southern Ulster.

== Campaigns of 1643-45 ==
With a stalemate in Ulster following the Battle of Clones, the Confederate Supreme Council ordered O'Neill and the Ulster Army to join Thomas Preston's Leinster Army in campaigns against Royalist strongholds in the Midlands. Despite the animosity between O'Neill and Preston (which often led to difficulties when they campaigned together), the campaign was successful, with several royalist strongholds in the Midlands, especially in the counties of Meath and Westmeath being captured or destroyed. They also raided much of the area for supplies.

In one famous battle, O'Neill's army was confronted by a British force under the command of Lord Moore. According to legend, O'Neill simply went over to a cannon, took aim, and blew off Lord Moore's head. After losing their commander, the British force retreated without a fight.

After the Midlands campaign, O'Neill was ordered to return to Ulster with Lord Castlehaven to conduct offensive operations against the territory held by the Covenanters. These attacks descended into a series of skirmishes but, despite being relatively unsuccessful, provided an important experience to the troops of the Ulster Army. O'Neill was deeply irritated that Castlehaven had been put in charge of the army instead of him, especially when the campaign failed. O'Neill later accused Castlehaven of cowardice, a dispute that was brought before the Supreme Council. At one point, O'Neill even considered leaving and returning to Spanish service, but was ultimately compelled not to with the arrival of weapons and reinforcements sent by the Papacy.

O'Neill returned to Ulster, where the Ulster Army set up winter headquarters at the town of Belturbet in County Cavan. The army, now better trained and experienced than ever before, emerged as a transformed force in the spring of 1646 and prepared to destroy the Covenanters.

== Battle of Benburb ==
In 1646, O'Neill, with substantial Gallowglass numbers and additionally furnished with supplies by the Papal Nuncio, Giovanni Battista Rinuccini, attacked the combined Protestant Laggan Army militia and Scottish Covenanter army under Major-General Robert Monro, who had landed in Ireland in April 1642. On 5 June 1646, despite being outnumbered and outgunned, O'Neill utterly routed Monro at the Battle of Benburb, on the Blackwater killing or capturing 3,000 Scots. However, he was summoned to the south by Rinuccini, and so was unable to take advantage of the victory, and allowed Monro to remain unmolested at Carrickfergus.

Upon receiving the news of the Confederate victory, the Pope, delighted at the news of a Catholic triumph over the Protestants, sent O'Neill the sword belonging to his great uncle, the Hugh O'Neill, Earl of Tyrone, who had led the rebellion against the English in the Nine Years' War. After the defeat in the conflict, he had fled Ireland during the Flight of the Earls in an attempt to gain support from Catholic powers in Continental Europe, where he died in Rome in 1616.

== Coup d'état and siege of Dublin ==
In November, O'Neill and Preston attempted to besiege Dublin. On 2 November, they sent an ultimatum to Ormond to admit a Catholic garrison into the town. When Ormond refused, the two generals marched to Lucan west of Dublin where they were joined by the Nuncio. With winter approaching and hearing that Parliamentarian troops had landed in Dublin, O'Neill abandoned the siege.

== Campaigns of 1647 ==
By 1647, the Confederate council was becoming increasingly concerned that the Royalist garrison in Dublin was planning to hand the city over to the Parliamentarians rather than let it fall into the hands of the Irish. For this reason, O'Neill and Preston were ordered to join forces to capture the city before any Parliamentarian forces could arrive. This was the largest army ever put together by the Confederates.

O'Neill and Preston set up camp between Lucan and Celbridge. Neither man was the overall commander, with both holding equal levels of command. However, neither man trusted the other, and their personal dislike of each other led to constant argument and bickering between the two. For a month or so, they could not agree on a plan of action, and in this time, the city was handed over to the Parliamentarians under the command of Michael Jones. The Royalist commander of Dublin, Ormond, said he "preferred English rebels to Irish ones". Afterwards, both generals retreated.

O'Neill then went on the campaign throughout northern Connacht, particularly against English strongholds in County Sligo. This campaign had mixed success, but O'Neill was recalled to Leinster after Preston was defeated by the Parliamentarians near Trim, County Meath. O'Neill drove Jones and his army back to Dublin while the Leinster army regrouped.

O'Neill, who was still in northern Leinster, was again called to Preston's aid when the Leinster army was almost destroyed by Jones at the Battle of Dungans Hill. As the remainder of Preston's army retreated, O'Neill arrived just in time to mount a successful rearguard action and annihilated the Parliamentarian advanced guard pursuing Preston. However, with the Leinster army now severely damaged, Leinster was in a precarious position. Afterwards, O'Neill returned to southern Ulster.

== Factionalism and disillusionment ==
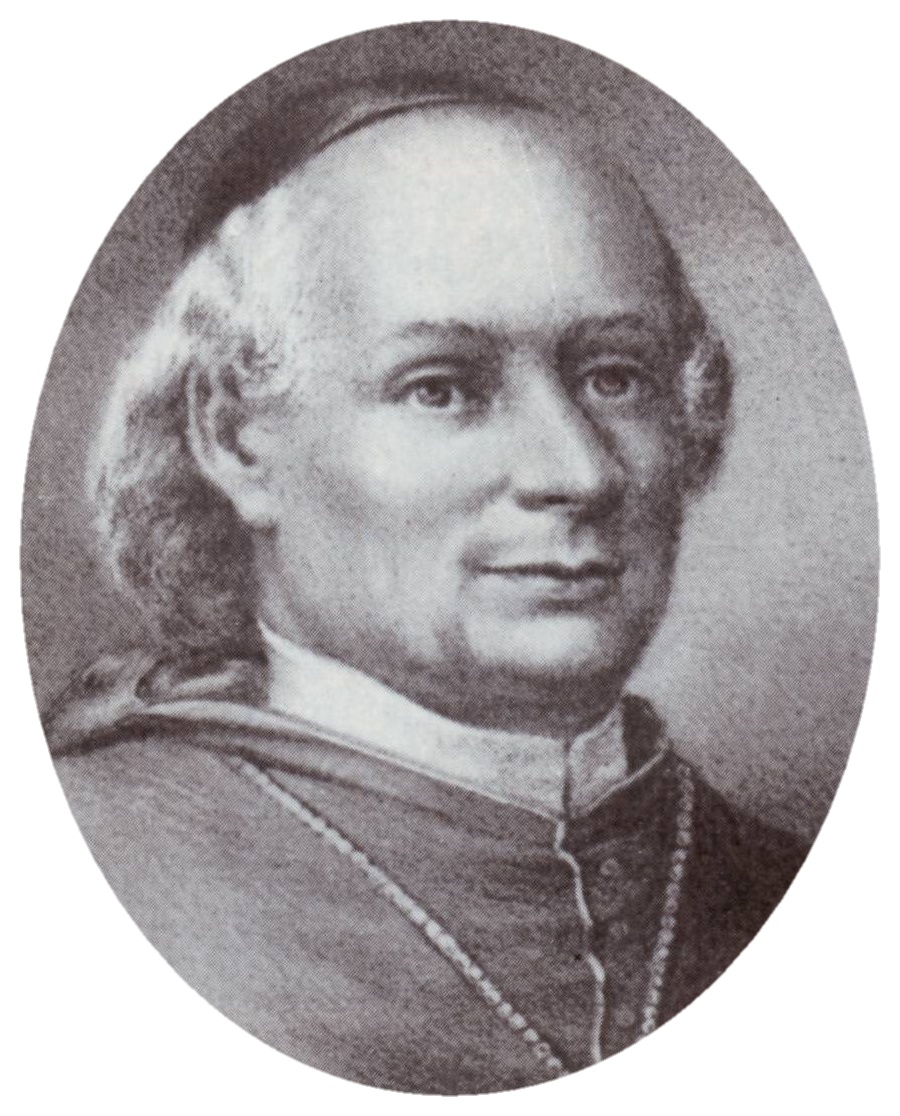
O'Neill's Ulster Army was closely aligned with the policies of the Papal envoy Giovanni Battista Rinuccini.

In March 1646, a treaty was signed between Ormond and the Catholics, which would have committed the Catholics to sending troops to aid the Royalist cause in the English Civil War. The peace terms, however, were rejected by a majority of the Irish Catholic military leaders and the Catholic clergy, including the Nuncio, Rinuccini. O'Neill led his Ulster army, along with Thomas Preston's Leinster army, in a failed attempt to take Dublin from Ormond. The Irish Confederates suffered heavy military defeats the following year at the hands of Parliamentarian forces in Ireland at Dungans Hill and Knocknanauss, leading to a moderation of their demands and a new peace deal with the Royalists. This time O'Neill was alone among the Irish generals in rejecting the peace deal and found himself isolated by the departure of the Papal Nuncio from Ireland on 23 February 1649.

So alienated was O'Neill by the terms of the peace the Confederates had made with Ormond that he refused to join the Catholic/Royalist coalition, and in 1648, his Ulster army fought against other Irish Catholic armies. He made overtures for alliance to Monck, who was in command of the Parliamentarians in the north, to obtain supplies for his forces, and at one stage even tried to make a separate treaty with the English Parliament against the Royalists in Ireland.

With O'Neill aligned with the Papal Nuncio, Rinuccini had the power to excommunicate those who supported the treaty with the Royalists, at which point more than 2,000 men deserted from Preston's Leinster Army and joined O'Neill's forces. O'Neill later relieved Parliamentarian commander Charles Coote, who was under siege in Derry by the Covenanters, in return for a herd of 2,000 cattle.

However, upon hearing of Oliver Cromwell's landing in Ireland and the subsequent Sack of Drogheda, and failing to obtain any better terms from the Parliamentarian forces, he turned once more to Ormond and the Catholic confederates, with whom he prepared to co-operate more earnestly when Cromwell's arrival in Ireland in August 1649 brought a war of horror.

== Death and legacy ==
O'Neill died on 6 November 1649 at the O'Reilly stronghold of Cloughoughter Castle on an island in Lough Oughter in County Cavan. One belief was that he was poisoned by a priest who was working for the English, another that he died from an illness resulting from an old wound. However, it is now widely believed that he died from complications related to gout, which he had complained about several days before his death.

Given O'Neill's well-known excellent defensive abilities and immense experience in siege warfare, he could have been a serious threat to Cromwell's invasion, and that would be reason enough to assassinate O'Neill. However, there is no evidence to support this, and it is generally accepted now that he died of gout. Under the cover of night, he was said to have been brought to the Franciscan abbey in Cavan town for burial. Local tradition is that he was buried at Trinity Abbey, on an island in Lough Oughter. His death was a major blow to the Irish of Ulster and was kept secret for some time.

After his death, the command of the Ulster army fell to his son, Henry Roe, until a replacement was found. Catholic nobles and gentry met in Ulster in March to appoint a commander to succeed O'Neill. Their choice was Heber MacMahon, Bishop of Clogher. The Ulster army was unable to prevent the Cromwellian conquest of Ireland, despite a successful defence of Clonmel by O'Neill's nephew Hugh Duff O'Neill and was destroyed at the Battle of Scarrifholis in Donegal in 1650. Its remnants continued guerrilla warfare until 1653 when they surrendered at Cloughoughter Castle in County Cavan. Most of the survivors were transported to serve in the Spanish Army.

In the 19th century, O'Neill was celebrated by the Irish nationalist revolutionaries, the Young Irelanders, as a patriot. Thomas Davis wrote a song about O'Neill, "The Lament for Owen Roe", first published in the Young Ireland newspaper The Nation. Drawing on an older melody composed by the harp player Turlough Carolan, it portrays his death as an assassination and the main cause of the subsequent defeat of Cromwell's English Republican forces. Its first verse is:

"Did they dare, did they dare, to slay Owen Roe O’Neill?”
"Yes, they slew with poison him they feared to meet with steel".
"May God wither up their hearts! May their blood cease to flow,
May they walk in living death, who poisoned Owen Roe".

Tommy Makem composed a song, "The Battle of Benburb", which commemorates O'Neill's 1646 victory over the Scottish Covenanters.

=== Commemoration ===
O'Neill is commemorated in the names of several Gaelic Athletic Association clubs in Northern Ireland, including (in Armagh) Eoghan Ruadh Middletown; (in Derry) CLG Eoghan Rua, Coleraine; (in Dublin) St Oliver Plunketts/Eoghan Ruadh GAA, and (in Tyrone) Brackaville Owen Roes GFC; Owen Roe O'Neill's GAC, Leckpatrick; Eoghan Ruadh, Dungannon GAA, in Down, Kilcoo Owen Roes GAC and the defunct Benburb Eoghan Ruadh GAC

The Irish Army opened a new barracks in 1990, to replace the old military post in Cavan Town since 1707?, and named it "Dún Uí Néill" (O'Neill's Fort or Fort of O'Neill). A & Sp companies of the 29th Infantry Battalion conducted border patrols and Aid To Civil Power operations from here. It was subsequently closed in 2012 during Irish Defence Forces restructuring.

== Sources ==
- Bréifne (2006). Egan, Terry (ed.). A Travel Guide to Bréifne: the Lost Kingdom of Ireland. Belfast: The Stationery Office Ltd. ISBN 978-0-337-08747-9.
- Bowcott, Owen (2011). "How lies about Irish 'barbarism' in 1641 paved way for Cromwell's atrocities". The Guardian.
- Carte, Thomas (1851) [1st pub. 1736]. The Life of James Duke of Ormond. Vol. III (New ed.). Oxford: Oxford University Press. OCLC 1086656347. – 1643 to 1660
- Casway, Jerrold (1984). Owen Roe O'Neill and the Struggle for Catholic Ireland. Philadelphia: University of Pennsylvania. ISBN 0-8122-7895-X.
- Casway, Jerrold I. (2004). "O'Neill, Owen Roe [Eoghan Ruadh O'Neill] (c.1550–1649)". In Matthew, Colin; Harrison, Brian (eds.). Oxford Dictionary of National Biography. Vol. 41. New York: Oxford University Press. pp. 851–856. ISBN 0-19-861391-1.
- Coffey, Diarmid (1914). O'Neill and Ormond – A Chapter of Irish History. Dublin: Maunsel & Company. OCLC 906164979.
- Gardiner, Samuel Rawson (1895). "O'Neill, Owen Roe 1590?–1649". In Lee, Sidney (ed.). Dictionary of National Biography. Vol. XLII. New York: MacMillan and Co. pp. 201–204. OCLC 8544105.
- Hayes-McCoy, Gerard Anthony (1990) [1st pub. 1969]. Irish Battles: A Military History of Ireland. Belfast: The Appletree Press. ISBN 0-86281-250-X.
- Lenihan, Pádraig (2008). Consolidating Conquest: Ireland 1603–1727. London: Routledge. ISBN 978-0-582-77217-5. – (Preview)
- Ó Fiaich, Tomás (2001). "Republicanism and Separatism in the Seventeenth Century". The Ireland Institute. Archived from the original on 17 August 2016 – via Internet Archive.
- Ó Siochrú, Micheál (October 2009). McGuire, James; Quinn, James (eds.). "O'Neill, Owen Roe". Dictionary of Irish Biography.
- O'Sullivan, Mary Donovan (1983) [1st pub. 1942]. Old Galloway: the history of a Norman colony in Ireland. Galway: Kennys Bookshops and Art Galleries. ISBN 978-0-906312-21-6.
- Taylor, John Francis (1896). Owen Roe O'Neill. London: T. Fisher Unwin.
- Webb, Alfred (1878). "O'Neill, Owen Roe". Compendium of Irish Biography. Dublin: M. H. Gill & Son. pp. 418–420. OCLC 122693688.
