= Richard Bellings (barrister) =

Irish barrister and landowner

Richard Bellings, Bealing or Bellyngs (died 1584) was an Irish barrister and landowner who was Solicitor General for Ireland from 1574 to 1584. His grandson and namesake Richard Bellings was a leading figure in Confederate Ireland, which governed much of Ireland in the 1640s.

He was probably born in Mulhuddart, County Dublin, a district with which his family had a long association. They were prominent members of the Anglo-Irish gentry of the Pale. He was called to the Bar, quickly became one of its leaders, and was appointed Solicitor General in 1574. He seems to have been diligent in performing his duties, pleading regularly before the Court of Castle Chamber (the Irish equivalent to Star Chamber) and sitting on several commissions of oyer and terminer. Presumably as a reward for his services, the Crown made substantial grants of land to him in County Dublin, including Tyrrelstown, which became the principal family seat. They also owned extensive property in County Kildare.

Despite his record of good service to the Crown and his legal ability, he never became a judge; this may reflect the personal disfavour of Queen Elizabeth I, who thought poorly of most of her Irish law officers, especially those like Bellings who were Irish by birth. Her remedy for the perceived "default and inefficiency of her officers of the law" was to replace Irish officeholders with Englishmen whenever a vacancy arose.

Elrington Ball, normally the most reliable source of information on the pre-1921 Irish judiciary, and who is also very knowledgeable about the history of Dublin generally, states that Bellings was still alive in 1600, but the letters patent appointing his successor as Solicitor General, Jesse Smythes, in January 1585, state clearly that he had recently died. Given the Queen's attitude to her Irish law officers it is not surprising that Smythes was English.

Little seems to be known of his marriage. Richard's son Sir Henry Bellings became Provost Marshal and High Sheriff of Kildare; despite a reputation for corruption, (including the notorious case of the aged English-born farmer Philip Bushen, who was hanged in 1625 for the murder of his wife, a crime which he almost certainly did not commit), and several clashes with the Crown, he had a largely successful career and extended the family estates.

Henry by his wife Maud was the father of the second Richard Bellings, the Confederate leader, and grandfather of the third Richard Bellings, secretary to Queen Catherine of Braganza.
