= Siege of Bunratty =

Part of the Irish Confederate Wars

Coordinates: 52.6996°N 8.8119°W

Parliamentarian Expedition to Bunratty
- Part of the Irish Confederate Wars
Date	March–July 1646
Location	Bunratty, County Clare
Result	Royalist/Confederate victory

Belligerents
English Royalists; Irish Confederates	English Parliamentarians

Commanders and leaders
Marquess of Worcester; Earl of Clancarty; Captain McGrath †	William Penn; John MacAdam †

Strength
2000+	7 ships with c. 1000 soldiers and sailors

Casualties and losses
High	High

Ireland and Bunratty

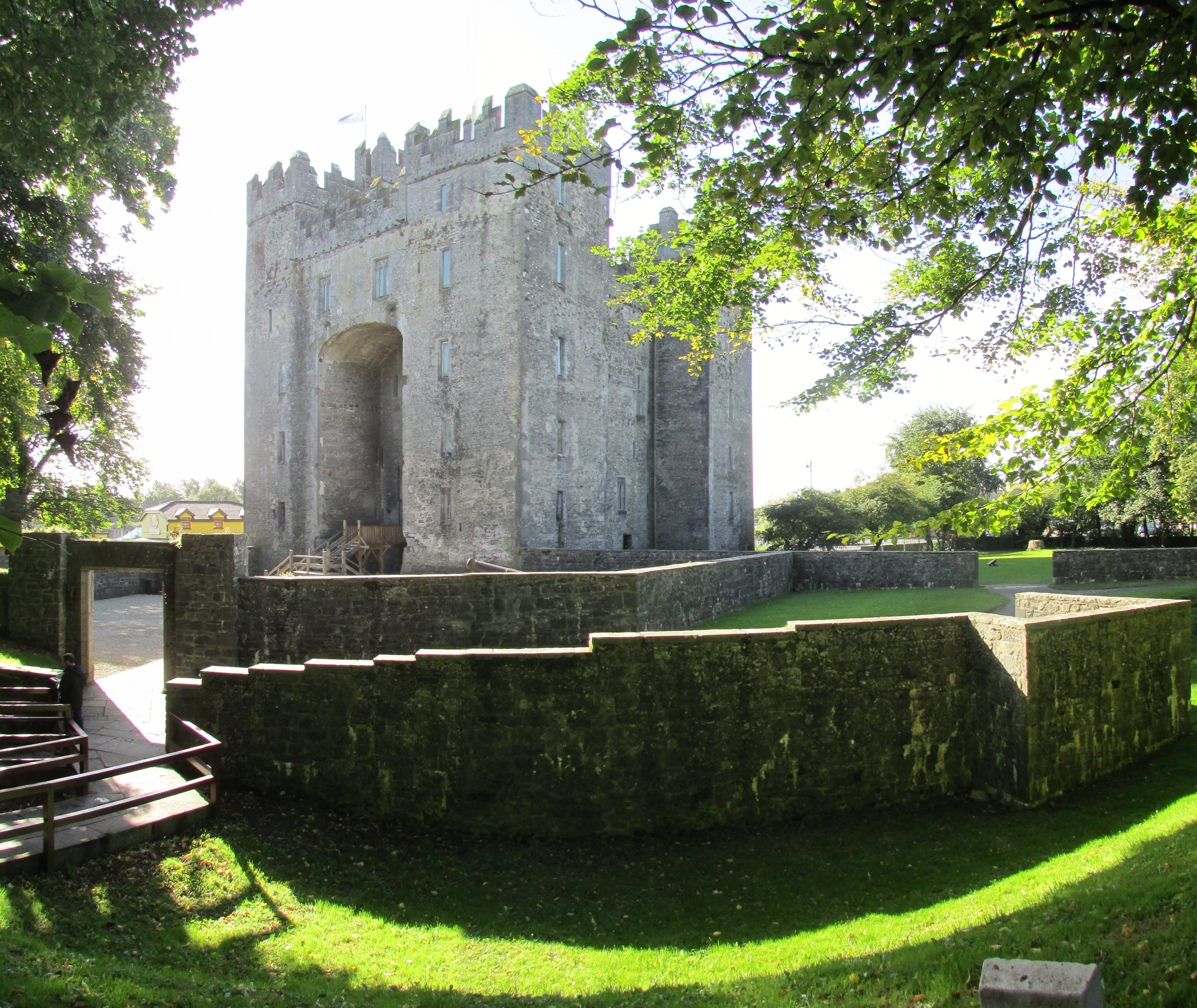
Bunratty Castle NE

The siege of Bunratty took place in County Clare in 1646 and was part of the Irish Confederate Wars, the Irish theatre of the Wars of the Three Kingdoms.

== Background ==
At the time of the siege, Bunratty Castle was the home of Sir Barnabas O'Brien (6th Earl of Thomand). Barnabas O'Brien was the son of Donough. Raised by Elizabeth I, he fought for the crown at the Siege of Kinsale. O'Brien attended the University of Oxford and was married to an English noblewoman. He was one of the wealthiest men in Ireland, holding 120,230 acres in 1641 and residing in Bunratty Castle, described by papal nuncio Rinucinni as 'the loveliest of any place of any kind that I have yet seen (in Ireland), worthy of a king, with gardens the likes of which put Italy's to shame'.

O'Brien was a Protestant and his estates were planted with English and Dutch tenants and when news of the rising came in November 1641 he encouraged his tenants to remain loyal to the crown but live quietly on their lands. During the early 1640s, he steered a neutral path. On the one hand, being Protestant he refused to sign the Oath of Association drafted by the Confederate Catholics of Ireland and on the other, he was later criticised for lack of military leadership and for not arming his Protestant tenants. The Confederates tolerated O'Brien and allowed him to remain unmolested, mainly because many of his O'Brien cousins had joined the Catholic war effort. Relations may have been cordial between O'Brien and the Confederates as he was closely related to many of their leaders:

The Catholic general the Earl of Glamorgan was married to his niece Margaret O'Brien, the daughter of his older brother Henry 5th Earl of Thomand. His nephew by his only sister was Donough McCarthy, Viscount Muskerry, the most powerful confederate Catholic in Munster who later led the siege of Bunratty. However, by the Spring of 1646, his Protestant cousin Murrough O'Brien (Inchiquin) who by now was President of Munster on behalf of the English Parliament, along with Barnabas' English wife persuaded him to hand Bunratty Castle over to an English Parliament garrison. Meanwhile, the Confederate Catholic council at Kilkenny were assembling troops to be sent to England as part of a deal to assist King Charles I or perhaps to be used against the Protestants of Munster. The Bunratty operation can be seen in this context as a diversionary tactic. According to a letter written by the Parliamentarian Lord Broghill "the progress of our designes in the River of Lymerick hat not only diverted a supply of six thousand from going to the King, and ready to be shipped at Waterford, but also ruined their projects upon us." Proof of the expedition being a diversionary tactic can be found in the Memorials of William Penn: "Having dined with his lordship we held consultation... to see whether he would join with us in the assaulting of the rebels in those parts, or at least the weakening and disabling them in their intentions upon the Lord of Inchiquin's quarters; or to obstruct the transportation of such forces... for the assistance of his majesty in this un-natural war against his subjects."

== Parliamentarian Expedition ==
On 11 March 1646, the English Parliament expedition anchored near Bunratty Castle. William Penn commanded the ships and Colonel John MacAdam commanded the land forces. According to the Memorials of Sir William Penn this consisted of 7 frigates and a hoy (heavy barge) with sailors and also carried 700 soldiers (although more troops arrived in various ships as the siege progressed), by April it was "800 foot and threescore horse" and by June 100 more had arrived. According to Penn's account, Barnabas O'Brien was eager to help and permitted Penn's men to occupy Bunratty. Penn's force started work to fortify Bunratty Castle, building platforms for guns, clearing thatched houses to allow fields of fire, and fortifying the landing area from the river in front of the castle. According to the Earl of Castlehaven's memoirs - "Lord Inchiquin, towards the Spring, sent along by sea from Cork 500 foot and 150 horsemen with saddles and all sorts of arms for horse and foot; who entering the Shannon, seized Bonratty in the county of Clare, a castle belonging to the Earl of Thomond, where they found a brave stable of horses and mares, on which he mounted all his horsemen."

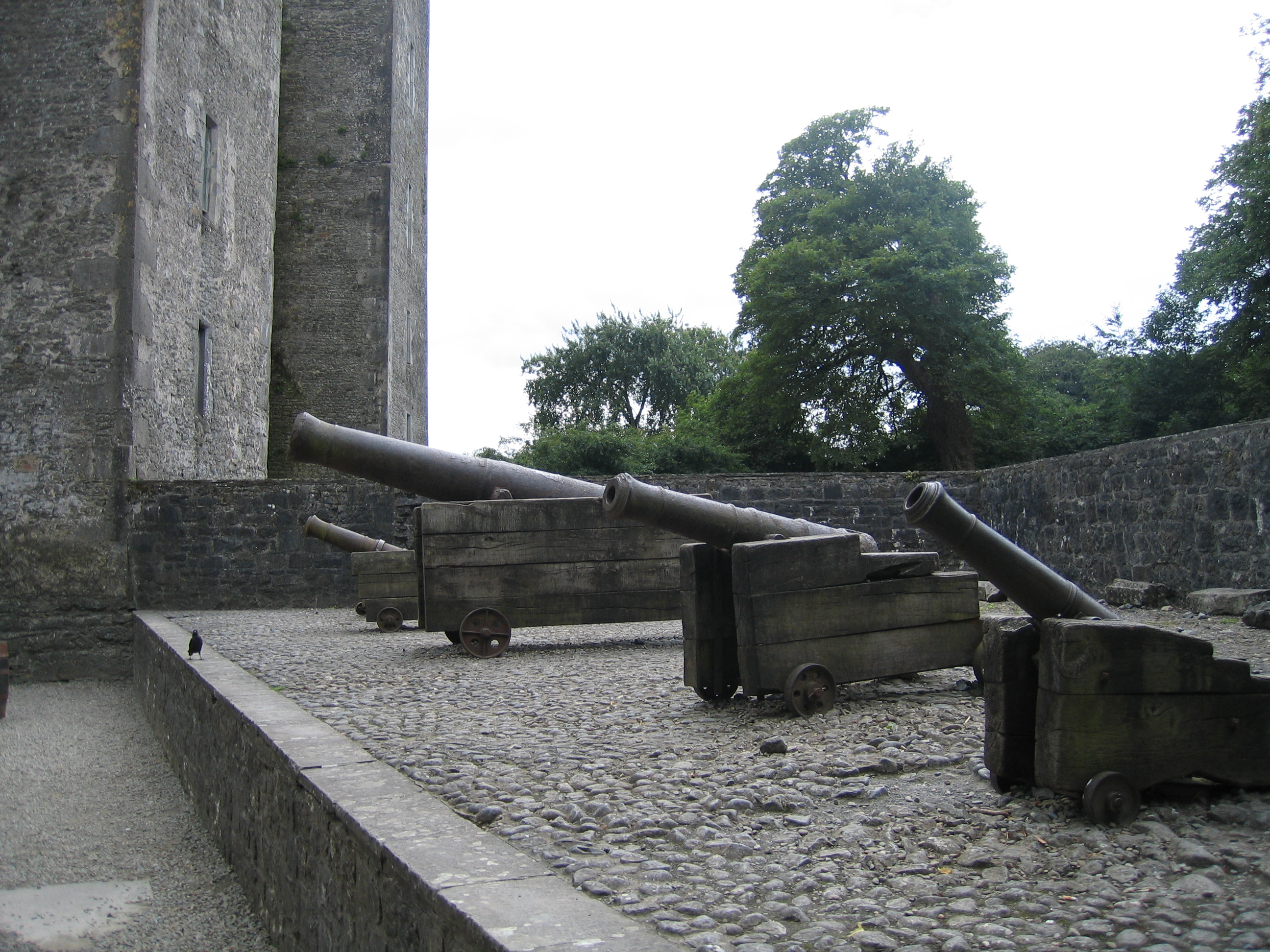
Guns Bunratty Castle

== Situation of Bunratty Castle ==
Bunratty Castle is in the Shannon estuary in the angle where the Shannon is joined by the river Ralty. In those days, the castle buildings consisted of the main keep and nearby to the north of that, a raised gun platform. To the west of the keep a fortified house known as the little castle, or Jeffords house, and also a small church. The north, south and west of the castle grounds were protected by an earth-work ridge and ditch and to the east it was protected by the river Ralty. On the west and south it was surrounded by a salt marsh which filled with the river Shannon on high tide. Beyond the earth-work, to the north, there was some flat ground advantageous to cavalry and a low hill beyond which was the road to Sixmilebridge.

== March 1646 Confederate Catholics react ==
Around this time, 6,000 men had been assembled by the Confederate Catholics and were waiting in Cashel and Clonmel before transport to Britain as part of a deal with the Royalists to serve the King but when this plan was seen as unfeasible, it was instead decided to send 300 as bodyguards to Charles, then Prince of Wales, in Jersey, and the rest were given over to the Earl of Glamorgan in order to take Bunratty, and if possible to attack Inchiquin.

== 1 April 1646 Glamorgan defeated ==
On 1 April Glamorgan's forces appeared at Bunratty but were driven off and in a follow up operation were driven out of their base in Sixmilebridge. According to Penn: "A party of 120 horse and 300 foot came to fire Bonratty... began at the end of the town, fired some houses and killed some English ... our horse issued under the command of Captain Vauclier, charged the enemy and by a fortunate shot wounding captain McGrath, they were totally routed and took flight. We followed the pursuit, slew 80 upon the place, took Captain McGrath alive with his brother who came to his rescue. In the afternoon we marched with two drakes, 600 foot and 50 horse, to the rebels camp at Six Mile Bridge, consisting of 1400 horse and foot; we set upon them, beat them out of their works, and being hotly charged they betook to their heels. Our horse and foot pursued 2 miles: yet little execution was done, by reason of the woods and a river near hand. Having killed about 30 and took 5 prisoners... brought away 250 barrels of oatmeal which served the soldiers six weeks for bread" Castlehaven describes these events also: "The Earl of Glamorgan, to keep in this garrison, ordered some troops to Six mile bridge between Limerick and Bonratty, but were beaten by that garrison". Curiously Penn describes how Captain McGrath and a lieutenant who died of their wounds were "honourable buried, with 3 vollies of small shot".

== Glamorgan is replaced by Viscount Muskerry and the siege of Bunratty begins ==
According to Castlehaven's memoir: "The Earl after this rendezvoused his whole army at Clonmell; to which rendezvous my Lord of Muskry came, and some differences falling out between these two noblemen, my lord Muskry took the command of the army to himself, and with it besieged Bonratty. To this siege the supreme council soon followed; the place held out five or six weeks."

On 11 May 1646, the Earl of Thomond, O'Brien, went to England. According to Penn's account, O'Brien was 'fearful to hazard his person' and took ship to England on 11 May intending to retire to his wife's Northamptonshire estate until the war was over.

On 13 May The Confederates closed in on the north side. According to Richard Belling's account from the point of the Confederates: The Lord of Muskery, having by his presence appeased the manie discontents of the souldiers and officers of the Mounster list, and composed them to a bodie, being now furnished with some money…..advanced to camp in the park of Bunratty, having taken a castle at the entrance into the parke…. Lieutenant General Purcell, Major -General Stephenson and Colonel Purcell who commanded the horse, all of them bred in the wars of Germany were entrusted principally with the conduct of the action." According to Penn: “We conceived the rebels were assaulting Cappagh castle about 2 miles from us.....where was a ward of our's consisting of 2 files of musqueteers and some that formerly inhabited the castle and thereabouts. The rebels having brought down their great guns made 26 desperate shot...a breach being made and being stormed by the rebels, our men....... yielded upon quarter for their lives. Having entered the castle and taken our men prisoners they marched to a castle called Rossmonnahane, not a full mile from Bonratty. This castle they summoned, being kept by a file of our men…….the castle was delivered up, without so much as a shot made: we believe the soldiers were hanged, as justly they deserve.”

By 22 May the Irish had taken over the hill to the north of the castle and using fascines as cover they advanced to within carbine shot of the defences. The English sallied out on 24 May to try and drive the Irish out of this position which initially they succeeded in taking, but a charge by the Irish horse drove them back again.

On 28 May Confederates attempted an ambush. According to Penn some Irish horse appeared and attempted to draw out the garrison "having made an ambush of musketeers behind hedges". The English musketeers came out and outflanked the ambushers and drove them from the hedges but "5 or 6 companies of foot and 2 troops of horse came down the hill and drove our musketeers back in their turn". Next, the English horse came out and drove the Irish back again. Meanwhile, the cannon were firing and the English managed to dismount an Irish demi-culverin which they then attempted to capture but they were also driven back.

By 29 May, the English were running short of supplies and decided to embark all wounded and non-combatants on ships to be taken to Cork and Kinsale which is done over the next few days.

At the start of June, the Irish tried to press forward with their siege works on the north but the level ground allowed English cavalry too much advantage and they made no ground. Muskerry was under pressure due to lack of money and feared he may have to disperse his army.

On 23 June, an English sally repulsed according to Penn: "I had notice of a sally made by our men upon the enemy; but being much engaged, and not able to make retreat, after some execution done upon the rogues, had near on thirty of our men killed and wounded..."

== Relief operations by Parliamentarians fail ==
According to Meehan's account: "Sir Charles Coote falling with a strong body of the Laggan forces in to the counties of Roscommon and Galway, as was supposed with a design to penetrate into Thomond, and relieve Bonratty... But fearing that the attempt might fail, the parliamentarian general contented himself with burning the crops about Portumna and Loughrea, and then returned to his quarters with large preys of corn and cattle."

According to Castlehaven's memoir: "I must now tell you that the Lord Inchiquin, on the certainty of Bonratty's being besieged, and the whole army of Mounster engaged, marched into the county of Limerick... and by diversion to oblige my Lord Muskry to draw off, by burning, plundering and destroying the country, even to the gates of Limerick... Whereupon Castlehaven joined with Garret Mac Thomas Fitzgerald and 1000 horse and Drew against my Lord Inchiquin and kept as near as him as I durst... This lasted four or five days till at length my Lord Inchiquin finding the check hindered him from destroying the country, retired to his garrisons, and I went to the siege."

== The Final Stages ==
At the start of July papal Nuncio Rinucinni arrived with £600. "Fearing that the siege of Bunratty would be abandoned by the troops owing to their want of pay, I have come to the camp and brought all the money I had left and some of my own also to lend to them, and I will not leave the place until I see a certainty of success or else that victory is despaired of." On 1 July while the Irish guns were firing on the little castle Colonel MacAdam was killed. This news was carried out by a Welsh deserter, giving the Irish a morale boost. According to Penn the Irish jeer at the English- "who called to our men, and bid them 'get a better commander'"

On 6 July the Irish stormed the little castle but were driven out again in a counterattack.

By 12 July the English fleet was forced to leave the vicinity of the castle because the Irish guns were now firing from the shore and doing major damage. According to the Penn's account: "11th.- Captain Dechicke and Lieut. Gibbon...came on board... to give notice of the present condition of the garrison; that they had not above 300 serviceable men among them, the rest being killed or miamed, and so not be able to make any longer resistance, but must be constrained to make their conditions... these most perfidious rogues made divers shot at our shipping, shot one of them through and through... they plied us so hard with two guns at a time that we were forced to let slip; in this condition riding within musquet shot of the shore and expecting to be galled by the enemy's guns... being conceived impossible for us to continue or riding here that with what speed might be, the ships should weigh, and fall down so low that they might not lie within the command of the rebel's guns... nor could we well do so, the fort, without the shipping, not being able to subsist."

== 13–14 July Parliamentarians surrender ==
According to Penn the remaining English troops were evacuated from the castle with agreement from Lord Muskerry."The conditions are so mean, and so far beneath the honour of a soldier, that I should never have consented thereunto"

According to Richard Bellings' account: "they were content to capitulate for their lives only and the officers their swordes, leaving cannon, horses, arms ammunition, and provisions to the Confederates".

According to Ormond Bunratty was taken 13 July.

According to Rinuccini the captured English banners were displayed at Limerick along with the banners captured from the Scots at Benburb.
