= Siege of Forthill =

- Part of The Irish Confederate Wars
Date	September 4, 1642 - June 20, 1643 (9 months, 16 days)
Location	Galway, County Galway, Ireland
Result	Irish Confederate victory

Belligerents
Irish Confederates	Kingdom of England

Commanders and leaders
John Burke	(Kingdom of England) Anthony Willoughby

Strength
1,000-1,400	200-300

Casualties and losses
Low	High

The siege of Forthill, also known as the siege of St Augustine’s Fort, took place from September 4, 1642, to June 20, 1643, in Galway, Ireland, during the Irish Confederate Wars.

== 1641 rebellion and background ==
Main article: Irish Rebellion of 1641

Following the outbreak of the Irish Rebellion in Ulster in October 1641, tensions rapidly escalated in Connacht. Galway's population, which was overwhelmingly Roman Catholic, initially sought to maintain a neutral or moderate stance. This delicate regional peace was largely preserved through the diplomatic maneuvering of Ulick Burke, 5th Earl of Clanricarde, a Catholic royalist nobleman who remained fiercely loyal to King Charles I.

However, mutual suspicion between the Catholic townspeople and the Protestant garrison grew intense. Captain Willoughby distrusted the loyalties of the townsfolk, while the citizens feared that the garrison would use the fort's cannons to subjugate or destroy the city, In early 1642, the fragile peace collapsed into open conflict. Incidents of mutual provocation culminated in Captain Willoughby ordering his garrison to fire artillery directly into the walled town. English soldiers launched aggressive sorties from the fort, culminating in the burning of Galway’s eastern suburbs and the seizure of civilian property.

In response, the citizens of Galway formally revolted, closing the city gates to the garrison and forming an alliance with the Catholic gentry of the surrounding countryside. By the summer of 1642, local forces under the command of Colonel John Burke, an experienced veteran of the Spanish Army of Flanders, began organizing a formal blockade of the fort.

The arrival of a Parliamentarian naval squadron under Alexander, 11th Lord Forbes in August 1642 temporarily altered the dynamic. Forbes, a staunch Covenanter, landed an aggressive force in Galway Bay to reinforce Willoughby's garrison and suppress the town. Forbes rejected the mediation attempts of the Earl of Clanricarde, subjected the town to naval bombardment, and desecrated local religious sites, including the Abbey of St. Augustine.

== The siege ==
Following the departure of Lord Forbes’s fleet in September 1642, the Confederate forces faced a significant tactical dilemma. St. Augustine’s Fort was a formidable stone structure designed to withstand heavy infantry assaults,and the Irish forces under Colonel John Burke completely lacked the heavy siege artillery required to breach its walls. Recognising this material disadvantage, Burke opted for a meticulous war of attrition.

Burke constructed a ring of earthworks and trenches around the landward sides of the fort, successfully severing all physical communication between Captain Willoughby’s garrison and the walled town of Galway. To enforce the blockade without exposing his troops to the fort’s superior firepower, Burke ordered his men to remain defensive and focus strictly on intercepting any foraging parties or sorties launched by the English.

By the winter of 1642, the strategy of strict containment began to take a catastrophic toll on the 200 to 300 defenders inside the fort. While an early English supply vessel had successfully slipped through the bay to drop off 130 reinforcement troops, these extra mouths quickly exacerbated the fort's compounding supply crisis.

The garrison rapidly exhausted its stores of salted meat and grain. Crucially, the fort lacked a reliable internal freshwater spring, relying instead on cisterns to collect rainwater. Burke’s tight land lines ensured that the garrison could not access the local wells outside the walls. As winter turned to spring in 1643, the lack of fresh water and a total absence of fresh vegetables triggered widespread outbreaks of scurvy, dysentery, and severe dehydration. By May 1643, Captain Willoughby's effective fighting force had been reduced to a skeletal remnant, rendering the fort entirely incapable of offensive operations.

== Surrender and aftermath ==
By June 1643, the situation inside St. Augustine’s Fort had become entirely untenable. Captain Anthony Willoughby's garrison was thoroughly depleted by disease, starvation, and extreme thirst. Desperate to avoid unconditional capture by the Confederate forces, Willoughby attempted a final political maneuver: he offered to surrender the fort directly to his fellow royalist, Ulick Burke, the 5th Earl of Clanricarde. Willoughby hoped that by surrendering to a crown-appointed neutral noble rather than the rebels, his men would receive better guarantees and the fort would remain nominally under royal control.

However, Burke firmly rejected this proposal. Operating with the full backing of the Confederation of Kilkenny, Burke refused to allow Clanricarde to act as a loophole. He maintained a strict military posture, asserting that the fort must surrender directly to his besieging army. Realizing that no overland relief was coming and that his garrison could not survive another week, Willoughby relented. On June 20, 1643, the English commander formally signed the articles of surrender directly with Burke.

The remnant of the garrison was permitted to march out of the fort with their personal belongings and board a small fleet of waiting transport ships in Galway Bay. Willoughby and his surviving men subsequently sailed away to safety, leaving the strongpoint entirely in Irish hands.

The capture of Forthill was a major strategic triumph for the Catholic Confederation in western Ireland. It permanently eliminated the immediate English military threat hanging over Connacht's primary merchant city, but, Despite the fort's immense strategic value, the Supreme Council of the Confederation feared that the site could easily be recaptured by future English expeditions and used against the town once more. Burke was ordered to systematically dismantle the fortification. Over the following months, local laborers threw down the heavy stone bastions, filled in the defensive trenches, and rendered the artillery platforms unusable.

For the next several years, Galway remained a secure, self-governing Catholic stronghold. However, this security was temporary; a decade later, the city would face the far more devastating and brutal Siege of Galway during which English Parliamentary forces under General Charles Coote would re-occupy and completely rebuild the fortifications at Forthill to permanently subjugate the town.
