= Richard Bellings =

Sir Richard Bellings (1613–1677) was a lawyer and political figure in 17th century Ireland and in the Wars of the Three Kingdoms. He is best known for his participation in Confederate Ireland, a short-lived independent Irish state, in which he served on the governing body called the Supreme Council. In later life, he also wrote a history of the Confederate period, which is one of the best historical sources on the Confederation.

== Early life ==
Richard was born at Bellinstown in 1613. Bellings was an Old English Pale gentleman. His grandfather, (also named Richard Bellings) was Solicitor-General for Ireland from 1574 to 1584, and was granted extensive lands by the Crown at Tyrrelstown (now a suburb of Dublin) in 1600. His father, Henry Bellings, served as Provost Marshal, and as High Sheriff of Wicklow County, where he campaigned against the O'Byrnes. Richard's mother was named Maud, but little else is known of her. Richard Bellings himself was trained as a lawyer at Lincoln's Inn, London, and afterwards served in the Irish Parliament as MP for Callan. However, in spite of this impeccably loyal background, Bellings, as a Roman Catholic, was banned from all public office. He later wrote that he resented the Protestant New English monopoly on, "places of honour, profit and trust" in the Irish government, which he, as a Catholic, was barred from. This resentment caused many Palesmen, including Bellings, to join the Irish Rebellion of 1641. However, Bellings later insisted that he and his peers joined the rising only out of self-defence, given the hostility of the English government in England and Ireland to Irish Catholics.

In October 1641, rebellion broke out in the northern province of Ulster, led by Gaelic Irish Catholic noblemen. Bellings and his contemporaries in the Pale did not immediately join the uprising, but were drawn into it by a number of events. Bellings in his history of the period cites his main reasons for joining the rebellion as; a refusal on the part of the authorities to arm the Catholic population to put down the rebellion or even in self-defence, the decision of the Lords Justices in Dublin to suspend the Irish Parliament and thus to avoid redress of Catholic grievances, and finally the victory of the insurgents at Julianstown, which brought the rebellion into the Pale and forced the Pale nobility to either join the Catholic rebels or to be treated by them as enemies. Bellings was among the Palesmen led by Viscount Gormanstown who signed a pact with Phelim O'Neill and Rory O'Moore, the rebel leaders in early 1642.

== The Confederate Politician ==
Bellings was one of the chief movers behind the creation of the Confederate Catholics of Ireland which sought to bring the anarchic rebellion under social control and to organise Irish Catholic armies in self-defence. Bellings was voted onto the Supreme Council as secretary (the Confederation's executive branch) in 1642. However, Bellings, like his colleagues on the Supreme Council, was a conservative Confederate. Because of his Old English background, he had little time for the initial Ulster-Irish rebellion. Also given his social standing, he detested social rebellion, calling it, "the violent fury of a rude and desperate multitude". He also strongly disapproved of the killing of Protestants in the early phases of the rebellion.

Bellings was a committed Royalist and was involved in negotiations with Ormonde – Charles I's representative in Ireland – to help the King in the English Civil War in return for political and religious concession to Irish Catholics. However, his critics argued that the Supreme Council were far too moderate in their demands and pointed out that many of them were actually related to Ormonde. In Bellings' case, this was true, he married Lord Mountgarret's daughter, and was thus related to the Ormonde dynasty and privy to the thinking of peers such as Ormonde himself, Mountgarret and Viscount Muskerry. Furthermore, in his capacity as secretary of the Supreme Council, he was also familiar with other aristocrats like Clanricarde and James Dillon, whose thoughts and actions during 1641–42 he recounts extensively in his history of the period. The Supreme Council's critics – mostly Gaelic Irishmen who allied themselves with Owen Roe O'Neill and later Giovanni Battista Rinuccini – were so alienated by the Supreme Council's failure to prosecute the Irish Confederate Wars successfully, that they began calling them "traitors" and "Ormondists".

Bellings spent 1644–45 as the Confederates' ambassador in continental Europe, visiting France, Spain and the Papacy to appeal for military or financial help. He returned in 1646 along with the Papal Nuncio Giovanni Battista Rinuccini. However, he was dismayed to find that Rinuccini rejected the Ormonde Peace treaty, that the Supreme Council had negotiated with the King. The Peace, although it abolished most of the civil restrictions on Catholics, did not guarantee public practice of Catholicism and offered no reversal of the confiscation of Catholic-owned land. Under pressure from Rinuccini and the Catholic Bishops, the peace was voted down by the Confederate General Assembly.

Bellings and his colleagues, which included Peter Valesius Walsh, were temporarily arrested and detained in Kilkenny Castle, but were released in time to conclude a new Omonde Peace with the Royalists in 1648. However, by this time it was too late to help the English Royalists and the English Parliament turned its attention on Ireland, re-conquering it in 1649–1653. See Also Cromwellian conquest of Ireland. Bellings managed to flee to the Royalist court in exile in France but his lands were confiscated in bulk by the Parliamentarians. In fact, they had been devastated in the wars anyway, as they lay directly on the route to Dublin taken by the contending armies.

== Restoration ==
After the English Restoration, Bellings was rewarded by Ormonde, (now Lord Deputy of Ireland) for his loyalty to the Royalist cause by being one of the few Confederates to recover their confiscated estates in the Act of Settlement 1662. In later life, he wrote a several-volume history of the 1640s, called The Confederation and War in Ireland. Bellings' account was written in the 1670s, from the perspective of a sound royalist, whose property had been recovered after the Restoration. He, therefore, presented the rebellion as a tragic accident caused by the King's untrustworthy ministers, and which was joined only reluctantly, and under extreme provocation, by him and his fellow Palesmen and Irish nobles. Although Bellings is often considered a typical Old Englishman, he considered himself Irish and his writings show a good familiarity with Irish Gaelic, including the Old Irish texts such as the Lebor Gabála Érenn.

He died in September 1677 and was buried at Mulhuddart, near Dublin, near his wife. His tomb, which was enclosed by a wall has no inscription visible upon it.

His son, another Richard Bellings, gained fame as the secretary to Catherine of Braganza.
