= Irish Confederate Wars =

Ethno-religious conflict within Ireland between 1641 and 1653

- Part of Wars of the Three Kingdoms
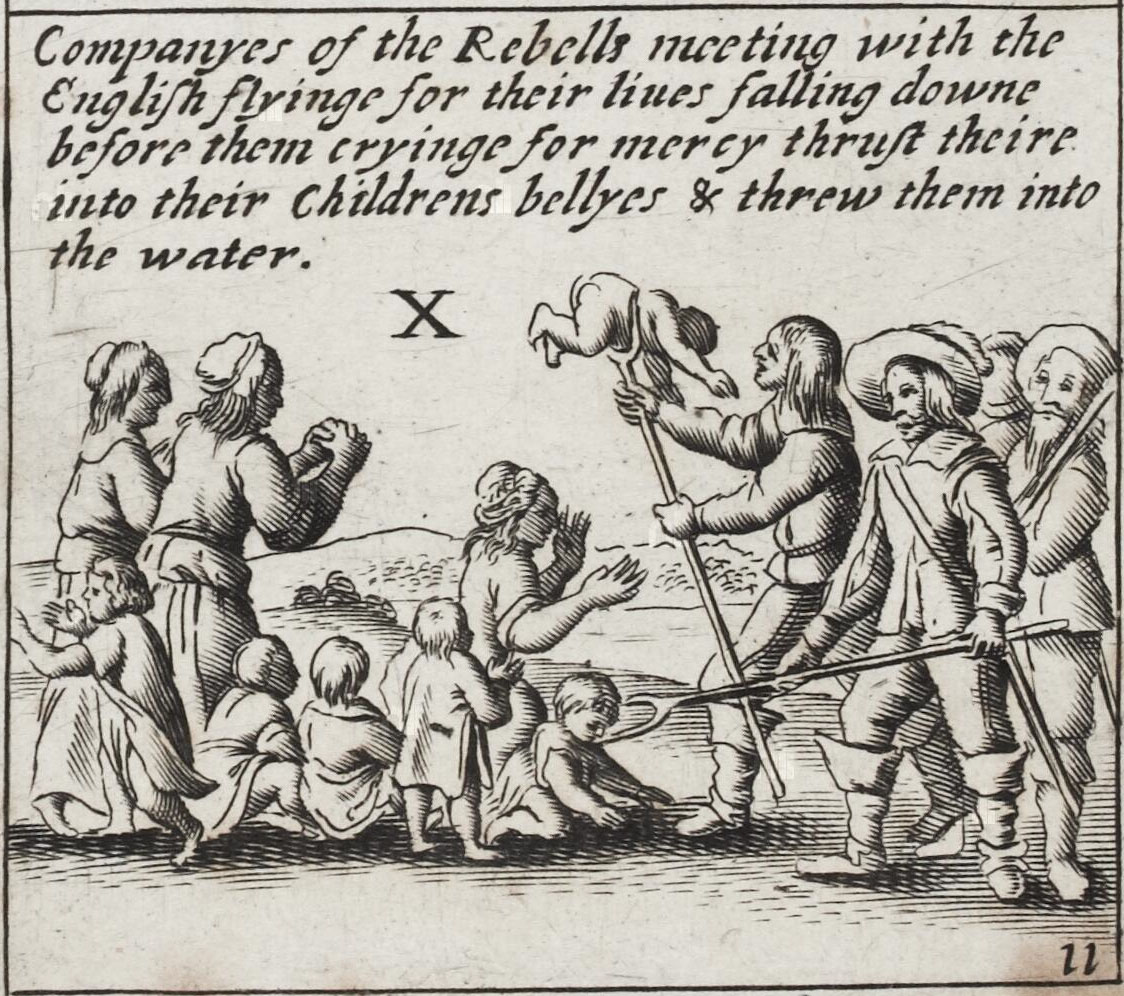
- Engraving of alleged atrocities committed during the 1641 Rebellion
Date	23 October 1641 – 27 April 1653 (11 years, 6 months)
Location	Ireland
Result	English Parliamentarian victory
Territorial changes	Ireland annexed by the Commonwealth of England

Belligerents
Phase I: October 1641 – September 1643: Kingdom of Ireland; Laggan Army; Scottish Covenanters	Phase I: October 1641 – September 1643: Confederate Ireland
Phase II: September 1643 – June 1649: English Parliamentarians; Scottish Covenanters	Phase II: September 1643 – June 1649: Confederate Ireland
Phase III: June 1649 – September 1653: England	Phase III: June 1649 – September 1653: Confederate Ireland; Royalists; Scottish Covenanters

Commanders and leaders
Phase I: Marquess of Ormond; Viscount Moore of Drogheda †; Baron Inchiquin; Robert Stewart; George Munro	Phase I: Owen Roe O'Neill; Thomas Preston; Garret Barry; Phelim Roe O'Neill; Viscount Mountgarret; Rory O'More
Phase II: Baron Inchiquin; Michael Jones; Laurence Esmonde; George Munro	Phase II: Owen Roe O'Neill #; Thomas Preston; Alexander MacDonald †
Phase III: (Commonwealth of England) Oliver Cromwell; (Commonwealth of England) Henry Ireton; (Commonwealth of England) Edmund Ludlow; (Commonwealth of England) Charles Fleetwood; (Commonwealth of England) Michael Jones; (Commonwealth of England) Robert Venables; (Commonwealth of England) Charles Coote; (Commonwealth of England) Roger Boyle	Phase III: Marquess of Ormond; Marquess of Clanricarde; Baron Inchiquin; Viscount Taaffe; Thomas Preston; Earl of Castlehaven; Viscount Muskerry; Edmund O'Dwyer; Richard O'Farrell; Hugh Dubh O'Neill; George Munro

Strength
10,000 soldiers (before 1649), 30,000 soldiers (after 1649)	60,000 (incl. guerrillas), 20,000 at any one time

Casualties and losses
c. 15,000+ dead	25,000+ battlefield casualties, 200,000+ civilians

The Irish Confederate Wars (Note: Also known as the Eleven Years' War or Irish: Cogadh na hAon-déag mBliana) took place from 1641 to 1653. The conflict began with the Irish rising of 1641 and evolved into a prolonged struggle over Ireland's future, as Irish forces sought to defend their land, political rights and autonomy against foreign control, plantation policies and continued encroachment on Irish self-government. Although linked to the wider Wars of the Three Kingdoms, the war in Ireland had its own distinct causes and objectives rooted in resistance to English rule, the recovery of confiscated lands and the defence of Irish interests. The conflict caused an estimated 200,000 deaths from fighting, as well as war-related famine and disease.

It began with the Irish Rebellion of 1641, when local Catholics tried to seize control of the Dublin Castle administration. They wanted an end to anti-Catholic discrimination, to increase Irish self-governance, and to roll back the Plantations of Ireland. They also wanted to prevent an invasion by anti-Catholic English Parliamentarians and Scottish Covenanters, who were defying the king. Rebel leader Felim O'Neill claimed to be doing the king's bidding, but Charles condemned the rebellion after it broke out. The rebellion developed into an ethnic conflict between Irish Catholics on one side, and English and Scottish Protestant colonists on the other. These first few months were marked by ethnic cleansing and massacres in Ulster.

Catholic leaders formed the Irish Catholic Confederation in May 1642, which controlled and governed most of Ireland, and comprised both Gaelic and old English Catholics. In the following months and years the Confederates fought against Royalists, Parliamentarians, and an army sent by Scottish Covenanters, with all sides using scorched earth tactics. Disagreements over how to deal with the rebellion helped spark the English Civil War in mid-1642. The king authorised secret negotiations with the Confederates, resulting in a Confederate–Royalist ceasefire in September 1643 and further negotiations. In 1644, a Confederate military expedition landed in Scotland to help Royalists there. The Confederates continued to fight the Parliamentarians in Ireland, and decisively defeated the Covenanter army in the Battle of Benburb. In 1647, the Confederates suffered a string of defeats by the Parliamentarians at Dungan's Hill, Cashel and Knockanuss. This prompted the Confederates to make an agreement with the Royalists. The agreement divided the Confederates, and this infighting hampered their preparations to resist a Parliamentarian invasion.

In August 1649, a large English Parliamentarian army, led by Oliver Cromwell, invaded Ireland. It besieged and captured many towns from the Confederate–Royalist alliance. Cromwell's army massacred many soldiers and civilians after storming the towns of Drogheda and Wexford. The Confederate capital Kilkenny was captured in March 1650, and the Confederate–Royalist alliance was eventually defeated with the capture of Galway in May 1652. Confederates continued a guerrilla campaign until April 1653. This saw widespread killing of civilians and destruction of foodstuffs by the English army, who also brought an outbreak of bubonic plague.

After the war, Ireland was occupied and annexed by the English Commonwealth, a republic which lasted until 1660. Catholicism was repressed, most Catholic-owned land was confiscated, and tens of thousands of Irish rebels were sent to the Caribbean or Virginia as indentured servants or joined Catholic armies in Europe.

== Overview ==
The war in Ireland began with the Rebellion of 1641 in Ulster in October, during which many Scots and English Protestant settlers were killed. The rebellion spread throughout the country and at Kilkenny in 1642 the Association of The Confederate Catholics of Ireland was formed to organise the Catholic war effort. The Confederation was essentially an independent state and was a coalition of all shades of Irish Catholic society, both Gaelic and Old English. The Irish Confederates professed to side with the English Cavaliers during the ensuing civil wars, but mostly fought their own war in defence of the Catholic landed class's interests.

The Confederates ruled much of Ireland as a de facto sovereign state until 1649, and proclaimed their loyalty to Charles I. From 1642 to 1649, the Confederates fought against Scottish Covenanter and English Parliamentarian armies in Ireland. The Confederates, in the context of the English Civil War, were loosely allied with the English Royalists, but were divided over whether to send military help to them in the war there. Ultimately, they never sent troops to England, but did send an expedition to help the Scottish Royalists, sparking the Scottish Civil War.

The wars produced an extremely fractured array of forces in Ireland. The Protestant forces were split into three main factions (English Royalist, English Parliamentarian and Scottish Covenanter) as a result of the civil wars in England and Scotland. The Catholic Confederates themselves split on more than one occasion over the issue of whether their first loyalty was to the Catholic religion or to King Charles I (see the principal factions in the war).

The wars ended in the defeat of the Confederates. They and their English Royalist allies were defeated during the Cromwellian conquest of Ireland by the New Model Army under Oliver Cromwell in 1649–53. The wars following the 1641 revolt caused massive loss of life in Ireland, comparable in the country's history only with the Great Famine of the 1840s. The ultimate winner, the English parliament, arranged for the mass confiscation of land owned by Irish Catholics as punishment for the rebellion and to pay for the war. Although some of this land was returned after 1660 on the Restoration of the monarchy in England, the period marked the effective end of the old Catholic landed class.

== The plot, October 1641 ==
The rebellion was intended to be a swift and mainly bloodless seizure of power in Ireland by a small group of conspirators led by Phelim O'Neill. Small bands of the plotters' kin and dependents were mobilized in Dublin, Wicklow and Ulster, to take strategic buildings like Dublin Castle. Since there were only a small number of English soldiers stationed in Ireland, this had a reasonable chance of succeeding. Had it done so, the remaining English garrisons could well have surrendered, leaving Irish Catholics in a position of strength to negotiate their demands for civil reform, religious toleration and Irish self-government. However, the plot was betrayed at the last minute and as a result, the rebellion degenerated into chaotic violence. Following the outbreak of hostilities, the resentment of the native Irish Catholic population against the British Protestant settlers exploded into violence. Shortly after the outbreak of the rebellion, O'Neill issued the Proclamation of Dungannon which offered justification for the rising. He claimed that he was acting on the orders of Charles I.

== The rebellion, 1641–1642 ==
From 1641 to early 1642, the fighting in Ireland was characterised by small bands, raised by local lords or among local people, attacking civilians of opposing ethnic and religious groups. At first, Irish Catholic bands, particularly from Ulster, took the opportunity given them by the collapse of law and order to settle scores with Protestant settlers who had occupied Irish land in the plantations of Ireland. Initially, the Irish Catholic gentry raised militia forces to try to contain the violence but afterwards, when it was clear that the government in Dublin intended to punish all Catholics for the rebellion, participated in the attacks on Protestants and fought English troops sent to put down the rebellion. In areas where British settlers were concentrated, around Cork, Dublin, Carrickfergus and Derry, they raised their own militia in self-defence and managed to hold off the rebel forces. All sides displayed extreme cruelty in this phase of the war. Around 4,000 Protestants were massacred and a further 12,000 may have died of privation after being driven from their homes. In one notorious incident, the Protestant inhabitants of Portadown were taken captive and then massacred on the bridge in the town. The settlers responded in kind, as did the Government in Dublin, with attacks on the Irish civilian population. Massacres of Catholic civilians occurred at Rathlin Island and elsewhere. The rebels from Ulster defeated a government force at Julianstown, but failed to take nearby Drogheda and were scattered when they advanced on Dublin.

By early 1642, there were four main concentrations of rebel forces: in Ulster under Phelim O'Neill, in the Pale around Dublin led by Viscount Gormanstown, in the south-east, led by the Butler family, in particular Lord Mountgarret, and in the south-west, led by Donagh MacCarthy, Viscount Muskerry.

== The Confederates' War, 1642–1648 ==
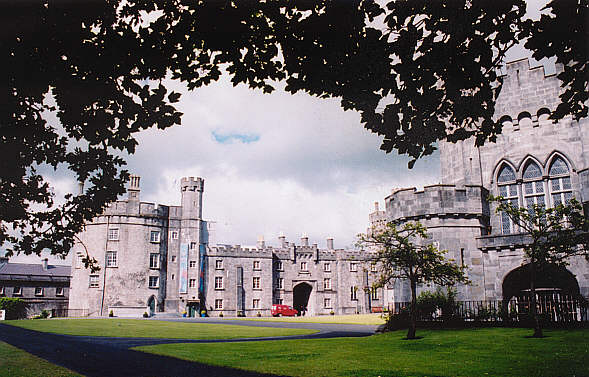
Kilkenny Castle, seat of the Confederate General Assembly

Charles I wanted control of Ireland to mobilise its resources against his opponents in England and Scotland; the Scots and their English Parliamentary allies aimed to prevent this. Over the course of 1642, 10,000 Scots funded by Parliament landed in Coleraine and Carrickfergus, while English forces re-established control over Dublin.

One of the last pieces of legislation approved by both Charles and Parliament before the outbreak of the First English Civil War was the March 1642 Adventurers' Act; this funded the war in Ireland by loans that would be repaid by the sale of lands held by the Irish rebels. As a result, neither side would tolerate the autonomous Catholic state demanded by Irish leaders and both were committed to further land confiscations; enforcing the Adventurers' Act was the primary objective of the 1649 Cromwellian conquest.

This resulted in the formation of Irish Confederacy, based at Kilkenny; by the end of 1642, it controlled two-thirds of Ireland, including the ports of Waterford and Wexford, through which they could receive aid from Catholic powers in Europe. While supported by most Irish Catholics, especially the clergy, many co-religionists among the upper classes were Royalists by inclination, who feared losing their own lands if the plantation settlements were overturned. Some fought against the Confederation; others like Clanricarde, stayed neutral.

Forces initially available to the Confederacy were primarily militia and private levies, commanded by aristocratic amateurs like Lord Mountgarret. These suffered a series of defeats, including Liscarroll, Kilrush, New Ross and Glenmaquinn, but the outbreak of the English Civil War in mid-1642 led to the recall of many English troops. This allowed Garret Barry, a returned Irish mercenary soldier, to capture Limerick in 1642, while the English garrison in Galway was forced to surrender by the townspeople in 1643.

By mid-1643, the Confederacy controlled large parts of Ireland, the exceptions being Ulster, Dublin and Cork. They were assisted by divisions among their opponents, with some areas held by forces loyal to Parliament, others by the Royalist Duke of Ormonde and the Covenanters pursuing their own agenda around Carrickfergus. The reality was an extremely complex mix of shifting loyalties; for various reasons, many Ulster Protestants regarded the Scots with hostility, as did some of their nominal allies in Parliament, including Cromwell.

=== Stalemate ===
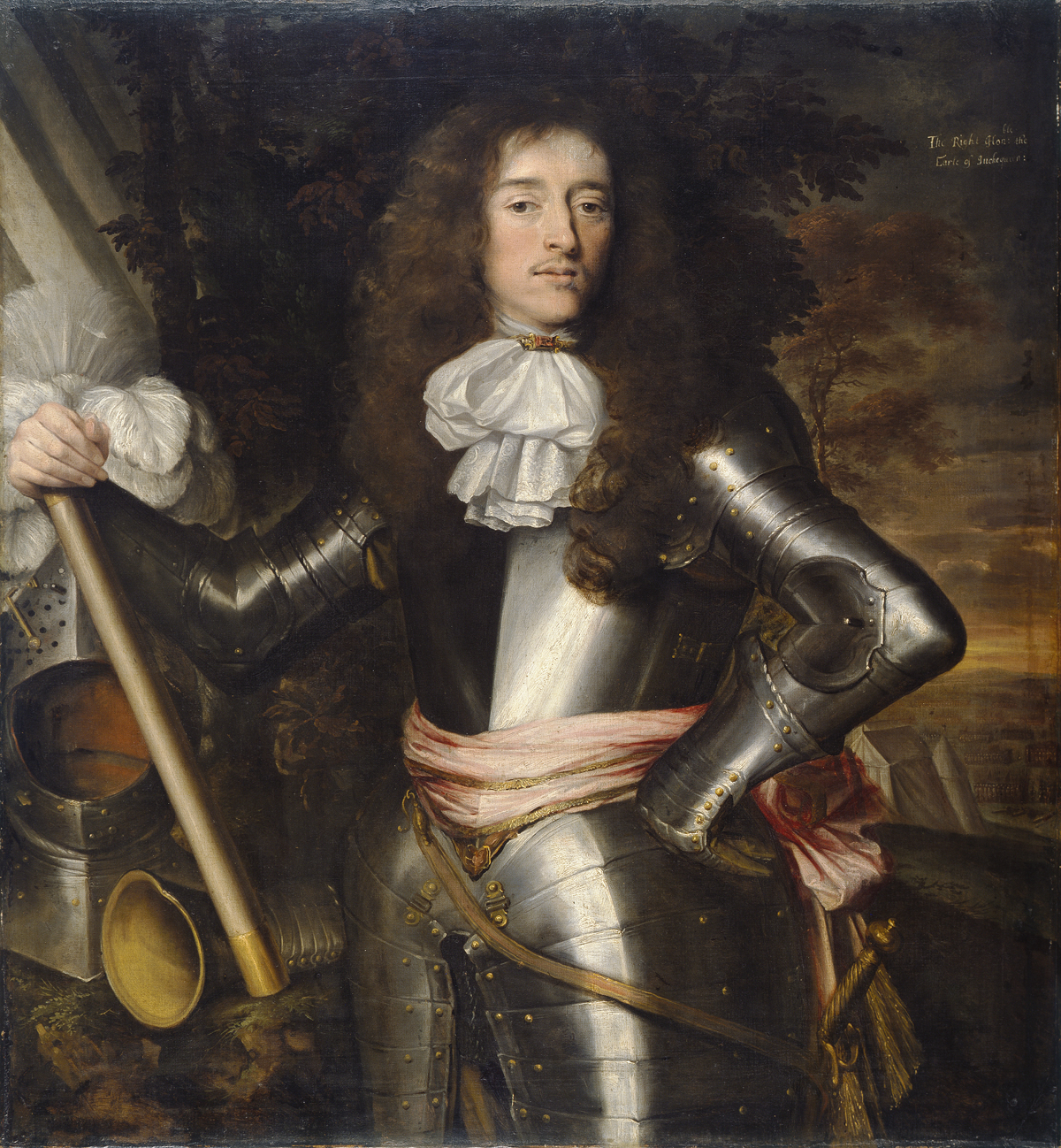
Inchiquin, commander in Munster, who defected to Parliament in 1644, then returned to the Royalists in 1648; an example of the complex mix of loyalties and motives

The Civil War gave the Confederates time to create regular, full-time armies and they were eventually able to support some 60,000 men in different areas. These were funded by an extensive system of taxation, equipped with supplies from France, Spain and the Papacy and led by Irish professionals like Thomas Preston and Owen Roe O'Neill, who had served in the Spanish army.

However, they arguably squandered an opportunity to conquer all of Ireland by signing a truce or "Cessation of Arms" with the Royalists on 15 September 1643, then spending the next three years in abortive negotiations. (Note: On 14 December 1646, approximately six months after the end of the First English Civil War, Parliament enacted an ordinance to void the Cessation of Arms.) The period 1642 to 1646 was dominated by raids, with all sides attempting to starve their enemies by the destruction of crops and supplies, causing great loss of life, particularly among civilians. The bitterness it engendered is illustrated by a Parliamentary Ordinance of October 1644, which forbade 'giving of quarter to any Irishman or Papist born in Ireland who shall be taken in Hostility against the Parliament either upon the Sea or in England and Wales.'

An offensive against Ulster in 1644 failed to make significant progress, while defeat at Marston Moor in July made it increasingly clear the English Royalists were losing the war; two weeks later, the Earl of Inchiquin defected to Parliament, giving them control of the ports of Cork, Kinsale and Youghal. In late 1644, the Confederates took Bandon but Inchiquin retained control of Cork; Preston captured Duncannon in January 1645, then besieged Youghal but lack of supplies forced him to abandon the siege in March 1645.

=== Refugees ===
The opening years of the war saw widespread displacement of civilians – both sides practising what would now be called ethnic cleansing. In the initial phase of the rebellion in 1641, the vulnerable Protestant settler population fled to walled towns such as Dublin, Cork and Derry for protection. Others fled to England. When Ulster was occupied by Scottish Covenanter troops in 1642, they retaliated for the attacks on settlers by attacks on the Irish Catholic civilian population. As a result, it has been estimated that up to 30,000 people fled Ulster in 1642, to live in Confederate held territory. Many of them became camp followers of Owen Roe O'Neill's Ulster Army, living in clan-based groupings called "creaghts" and driving their herds of cattle around with the army. Outside of Ulster, the treatment of civilians was less harsh, although the "no-mans-land" in between Confederate and British held territory in Leinster and Munster was repeatedly raided and burned, with the result that it too became de-populated.

=== Victory and defeat for the Confederates ===
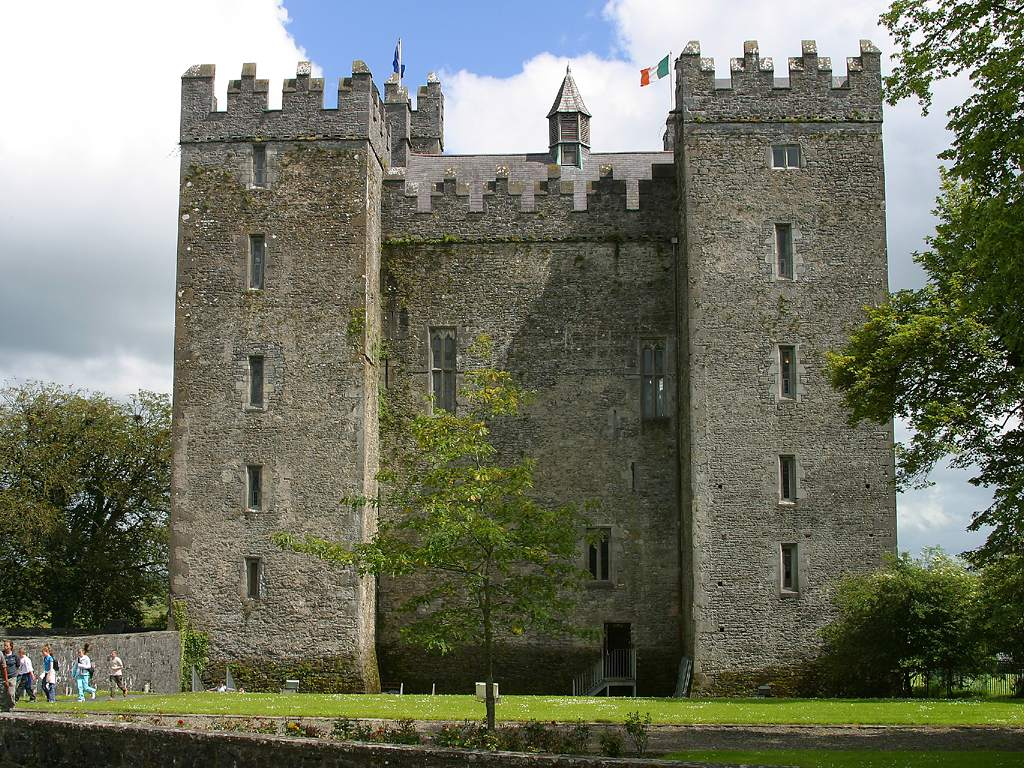
Bunratty Castle, besieged and taken by the Irish Confederates from an English Parliamentarian force in 1646

The stalemate, however, broke in 1646. During the summer after the end of the First English Civil War, the Confederate military tried to make as many gains in Ireland as they could before the expected invasion by the forces of the English Parliament. In that effort they were quite successful. On 5 June 1646, Owen O'Neill defeated a Parliamentary and Scottish army commanded by Robert Munro at Benburb. During July, Thomas Preston leading the Leinster Army of the Confederates captured the Parliamentary stronghold at Roscommon while Donough McCarthy Viscount Muskerry captured the castle of Bunratty.

On 30 July, however, it was proclaimed in Dublin by the Royalists that the Confederate Supreme Council had signed a peace treaty on 28 March 1646 with King Charles as represented by Ormonde. The treaty was signed unbeknownst to the Confederate military commanders and without the participation of the leader of the Catholic clergy, Rinuccini, who had arrived in Ireland with money and arms as the Papal Nuncio nine months earlier.

Many provisions of the treaty were unacceptable to Rinuccini and the Confederate military commanders, especially sending military support to Royalists in England for a cause that was seemingly ended with the conclusion of the civil war. Rinuccini and the Confederate military commanders also believed that there might be a chance for them to defeat the English in Ireland and take total control given the magnitude of their recent victories. As so, Rinuccini publicly denounced the Ormonde treaty on 12 August. Rinuccini and the Confederate military then marched upon Kilkenny, declared the Ormonde treaty void, and created a new Confederate Supreme Council.

Trying next to take control of Ireland, the Confederate armies commanded by O'Neill and Preston attempted to capture Dublin, Ormonde's Royalist garrison, by siege. Their plan to seize Dublin failed, however, as the Royalists had devastated the land around their capital and the Confederate commanders were unable to feed their armies. The inability to capture Dublin was an embarrassment to Rinuccini and the Confederates as it exposed the folly of their strategy of conquering Ireland. Ormonde then turned to negotiations with the English Parliament and ultimately handed the city over to a Parliamentarian army commanded by Colonel Michael Jones on 19 June 1647.

In 1647, the Parliamentarian forces inflicted a shattering series of defeats on the Confederates, ultimately forcing them to join a Royalist coalition to try to hold off a Parliamentarian invasion. Firstly, in August 1647, when it tried to march on Dublin, Thomas Preston's Leinster army was annihilated at the battle of Dungans Hill by Jones' Parliamentarian army. This was the best trained and best equipped Confederate army and the loss of its manpower and equipment was a body blow to the Confederation. Secondly, the Parliamentarians based in Cork devastated the Confederates' territory in Munster, provoking famine among the civilian population. In September, they stormed Cashel, not only taking the town but also massacring its garrison and inhabitants, including several Catholic clerics. When the Irish Munster army brought them to battle at Knocknanauss in November, they too were crushed. Sligo also changed hands again – captured by the Ulster British settlers' army. The battles in this phase of the war were exceptionally bloody: in the battles of 1646–47, the losers had up to half of those engaged killed – most commonly in the rout after the battle was decided. In the three largest engagements of 1647, no less than 1% of the Irish male population (around 7,000–8,000 men) were killed in battle.

This string of defeats forced the Confederates to come to a deal with the Royalists, and to put their troops under their command. Amid factional fighting within their ranks over this deal, the Confederates dissolved their association in 1648 and accepted Ormonde as the commander in chief of the Royalist coalition in Ireland. Inchiquin, the Parliamentarian commander in Cork, also defected to the Royalists after the arrest of King Charles I.

The Confederates were fatally divided over this compromise. Rinuccini, the Papal Nuncio, threatened to excommunicate anyone who accepted the deal. Particularly galling for him was the alliance with Inchiquin, who had massacred Catholic civilians and clergy in Munster in 1647. There was even a brief period of civil war in 1648 between Owen Roe O'Neill's Ulster Army, as he refused to accept the Royalist alliance, and the new Royalist–Confederate coalition. O'Neill neglected to secure adequate supplies and was unable to force a change in policy on his former comrades. During this divisive period the Confederates missed a second strategic chance to reorganise while their opponents were engaged in the Second English Civil War (1648–49), which was lost by their royalist allies.

== The Cromwellian War, 1649–1653 ==
Oliver Cromwell landed in Ireland in 1649 to re-conquer the country on behalf of the English Parliament. He left in 1650, having taken eastern and southern Ireland – passing his command to Henry Ireton.

The Confederate/Royalist coalition wasted valuable months fighting with Owen Roe O'Neill and other former Confederates instead of preparing to resist the impending Parliamentarian invasion of Ireland. O'Neill later re-joined the Confederate side. Belatedly, in summer 1649, Ormonde tried to take Dublin from the Parliamentarians, and was routed by Michael Jones at the battle of Rathmines.

Oliver Cromwell landed shortly afterwards with the New Model Army. Whereas the Confederates had failed to defeat their enemies in eight years of fighting, Cromwell was able to succeed in three years in conquering the entire island of Ireland, because his troops were well supplied, well equipped (especially with artillery), and well trained. Moreover, he had a huge supply of men, money and logistics to fund the campaign.

=== The Cromwellian Conquest ===
His first action was to secure the east coast of Ireland for supplies of men and logistics from England. To this end, he took Drogheda and Wexford, perpetrating massacres of the defenders of both towns. He also sent a force to the north to link up with the British settler army there. Those settlers who supported the Scots and Royalists were defeated by the Parliamentarians at the battle of Lisnagarvey.

Ormonde signally failed to mount a military defence of southern Ireland. He based his defences upon walled towns, which Cromwell systematically took one after the other with his ample supply of siege artillery. The Irish and Royalist field armies did not hold any strategic line of defence and instead were demoralised by a constant stream of defeats and withdrawals. Only at the siege of Clonmel did Cromwell suffer significant casualties (although disease also took a very heavy toll on his men). His losses were made good by the defection of the Royalist garrison of Cork, who had been Parliamentarians up to 1648, back to the Parliament side. Cromwell returned to England in 1650, passing his command to Henry Ireton.

In the north, the Parliamentarian/settler army met the Irish Ulster army at the battle of Scarrifholis and destroyed it. Ormonde was discredited and fled for France, to be replaced by Ulick Burke, Earl of Clanricarde. By 1651, the remaining Royalist/Irish forces were hemmed into an area west of the River Shannon, holding only the fortified cities of Limerick and Galway and an enclave in County Kerry, under Donagh MacCarthy, Viscount Muskerry.

Ireton besieged Limerick while the northern Parliamentarian army under Charles Coote besieged Galway. Muskerry made an attempt to relieve Limerick, marching north from Kerry, and was routed by Roger Boyle at the battle of Knocknaclashy. Limerick and Galway were too well defended to be taken by storm, and were blockaded until hunger and disease forced them to surrender Limerick in 1651, and Galway in 1652. Waterford and Duncannon also surrendered in 1651.

=== Guerrilla War ===
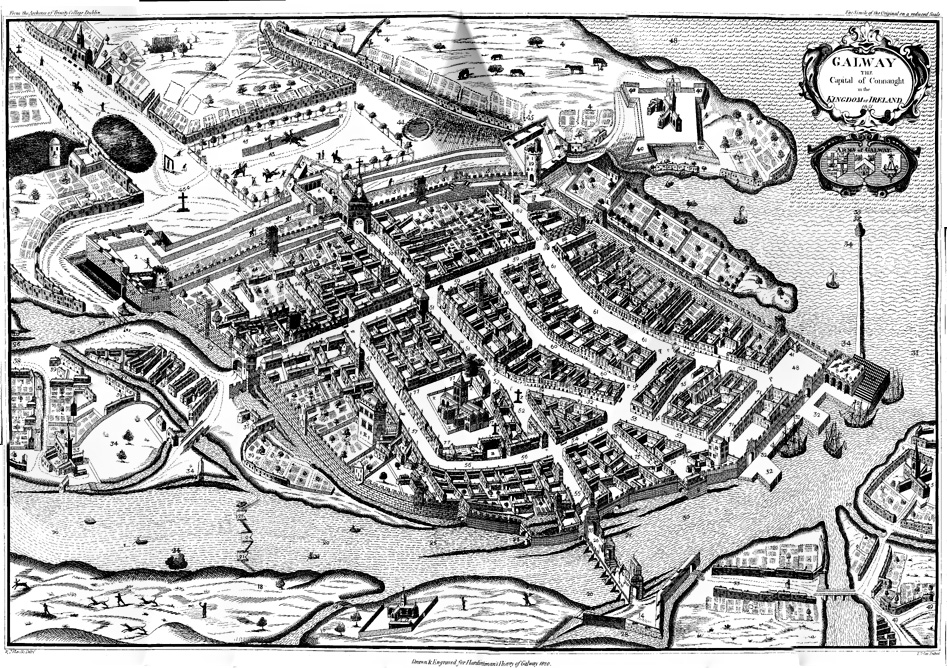
Galway; the last Irish town to fall to the Parliamentarians, in 1652.

While formal resistance ended, the harsh surrender terms resulted in a period of guerrilla warfare by bands of former soldiers, known as Tóraidhe or 'Tories.' These operated from rugged areas such as the Wicklow Mountains, looting supplies and attacking Parliamentary patrols, who responded with forced evictions and the destruction of crops. The result was widespread famine, aggravated by an outbreak of bubonic plague.

The last organised Irish force surrendered in Cavan in April 1653 and given passage to France to either serve in the French army or with the English Royalist Court in exile. Those captured after this point were executed or transported to penal colonies in the West Indies.

Ireland was plagued with small scale violence for the remainder of the 1650s, partly due to the 1652 Act for the Settlement of Ireland. This created a class of landless former farmers and dramatically altered patterns of Irish land holding, the percentage owned by Protestants increasing from 41% to 78% over the period 1641 to 1660.

== Shifting allegiances ==
The Irish Confederate Wars were a complex conflict in which no fewer than four major armies fought in Ireland. These were the Royalists loyal to King Charles, the Scottish Covenanters (sent into Ulster in 1642 to protect Protestant planters after the massacres that marked the Irish rebellion of 1641 in that region), the Parliamentarian army, and the Irish Confederate army to whom most of the inhabitants of Ireland gave their allegiance. During the wars, all of these forces came into conflict at one stage or another. To add to the turmoil, a brief civil war was fought between Irish Confederate factions in 1648.

The Royalists under Ormonde were in conflict with Irish Catholic forces from late 1641 to 1643. Their main enclave was in Dublin. A ceasefire with the Confederate Catholics lasted from 1643 until 1646, when the Confederates again came into conflict with the Royalists. After 1648 most of the Confederates and the Scots joined an alliance with the Royalists. This was the array of forces that was to face Cromwell's army in 1649. Ormonde's handling of the defence of Ireland was however rather inept so that by mid-1650 the defence of Ireland was conducted mainly by Irish Confederate leaders.

The Irish Confederates: formed in October 1642, the Confederation of Kilkenny was initially a rebel Irish Catholic movement, fighting against the English troops sent to put down the rebellion, though they insisted they were at war with the king's advisers and not with Charles himself. They also had to fight the Scottish army that landed in Ulster. From 1642 to 1649, the Confederates controlled most of Ireland except for east and west Ulster, Cork city and Dublin. A cessation was arranged with the Royalists in 1643 after the outbreak of civil war in England and negotiations began to bring the Confederates into the English conflict on the Royalist side. A strongly Catholic faction under the influence of the Irish Bishops and Nuncio Rinuccini emerged in 1646, which opposed signing a peace treaty that did not recognise the position of the Catholic Church in Ireland or return confiscated Catholic land. When this faction ousted the Confederate 'peace party' or pro-Royalists, the Confederates once again clashed with the English Royalists, who abandoned most of their positions in Ireland to the Parliamentarians during 1646. However, after fresh negotiations, an alliance was arranged between the Royalists and Confederates in 1648. Some Confederates (most notably the Ulster army) were however opposed to this treaty initiating a brief Irish Catholic civil war in 1648 in which the Ulster Confederate army was supported by the English Parliament.

The Scottish Covenanters arrived in Ireland in early 1642 to put down the uprising and thereby protect the lives and property of the Scottish Protestant settlers in Ulster. They held most of eastern Ulster for the duration of the war, but were badly weakened by their defeat by the Confederates at the battle of Benburb in 1646. They fought the Confederates (with the support of the English Parliament) from their arrival in Ulster in 1642 until 1648. After the English Parliament and the Scottish Covenanters' alliance broke down, the Scottish forces in Ulster joined the Confederates and Royalists in an alliance against their former allies in 1649.

The Parliamentarian Army gained a major foothold in Ireland for the first time in 1644, when Inchiquin's Cork-based Protestant force fell out with the Royalists over their ceasefire with the Confederates. The Protestant settler forces in the north west of Ireland, known as the Laggan Army (or Laggan Force), also came over to the Parliamentarians after 1644, deeming them to be the most reliably anti-Catholic of the English forces. The city of Dublin fell into Parliamentarian hands in 1646, when the Royalists surrendered it to an English Parliamentarian expeditionary force after the city was threatened by Confederate armies. In 1648 the Parliamentarians briefly gave support to Owen Roe O'Neill's Ulstermen after his fall out with the Confederates: Thus the extreme Catholic and Puritan forces were briefly allied for mutual expediency. The Ulster Catholic army however joined the Confederate-Royalist alliance after the shock of Cromwell's invasion in August 1649. The most potent Parliamentarian force was the New Model Army, which proceeded to conquer Ireland over the next four years and to enforce the Adventurers' Act 1640 by conquering and selling Irish land to pay off its financial backers.

== Aftermath ==
The toll of the conflict was huge. Irish historian William Lecky wrote:

Hardly any page in human history is more appalling. A full third of the population of Ireland perished. Thirty or forty thousand of the most energetic left the country and took service in foreign armies. Great tracts were left absolutely depopulated....

William Petty, a Cromwellian who conducted the first scientific land and demographic survey of Ireland in the 1650s (the Down Survey), concluded that at least 400,000 people and maybe as many as 620,000 had died in Ireland between 1641 and 1653. The true figure may well be lower given Petty's outmoded methodology, but the lowest suggested is about 200,000. At the time, according to William Petty, the population of Ireland was only around 1.5 million inhabitants. It is estimated that about two-thirds of the deaths were civilian. The Irish defeat led to the mass confiscation of Catholic owned land and the English Protestant domination of Ireland for over two centuries.

The wars, especially the Cromwellian conquest, were long remembered in Irish culture. Gaelic and Irish poetry of the post-war era laments lack of unity among Irish Catholics in the Confederation and their constant infighting, which was blamed for their failure to resist Cromwell. Other common themes include the mourning of the old Irish Catholic landed classes, which were destroyed in the wars, and the cruelty of the Parliamentarian forces.

== List of battles ==
- 1641: Portadown Massacre
- 1641: Siege of Drogheda
- 1641: Battle of Julianstown
- 1642: Battle of Swords
- 1642: Battle of Liscarroll
- 1642: Battle of Kilrush
- 1642: Battle of Glenmaquin
- 1642: Sack of the Claddagh
- 1642: Siege of Limerick 1642
- 1643: Battle of New Ross (1643)
- 1643: Battle of Cloughleagh
- 1643: Battle of Clones
- 1643: Battle of Portlester
- 1643: Siege of Forthill
- 1645: Siege of Duncannon
- 1646: Battle of Benburb
- 1646: Siege of Bunratty
- 1647: Battle of Dungans Hill
- 1647: Sack of Cashel
- 1647: Battle of Knocknanauss
- 1649: Siege of Dublin
- 1649: Battle of Rathmines
- 1649: Siege of Drogheda
- 1649: Sack of Wexford
- 1649: Siege of Waterford
- 1649: Battle of Arklow/Glascarrick
- 1649: Battle of Lisnagarvey
- 1649: Siege of Derry (1649)
- 1650: Siege of Kilkenny
- 1650: Siege of Clonmel
- 1650: Battle of Tecroghan
- 1650: Battle of Scarrifholis
- 1650: Siege of Charlemont
- 1650: Battle of Macroom
- 1650: Battle of Meelick Island
- 1651: Siege of Limerick (1650–1651)
- 1651: Battle of Knocknaclashy
- 1652: Siege of Galway

== See also ==
Soldiers:

- Alasdair MacColla
- Hugh Dubh O'Neill
- George Monck
- Richard Talbot, 1st Earl of Tyrconnel
- Michael Jones (soldier)
- Theobald Taaffe, 1st Earl of Carlingford

Political figures:

- Patrick D'Arcy
- Richard Martyn
- James Tuchet, 3rd Earl of Castlehaven
- Richard Bellings
- Nicholas French
- Patrick O'Neill (Irish soldier)
- Giovanni Battista Rinuccini
- Nicholas Plunkett
- Charles II

Places:

- Clonmel
- Rathfarnham Castle
- Trim Castle
- Cahir Castle
- Narrow Water
- Ross Castle
- Rock of Cashel
- Charlemont Fort

General:

- Chronology of the Irish Confederate Wars
- Chronology of the Wars of the Three Kingdoms
- Confederate Ireland
- Cromwellian conquest of Ireland
- Irish Rebellion of 1641
- List of Irish rebellions
- List of Irish battles

== Sources ==
- Coffey, Diarmid (1914). O'Neill and Ormond – A Chapter of irish History. Dublin: Maunsel & Company.
- Gilbert, John Thomas (1882). History of the Irish Confederation and the War in Ireland 1641–1652. Historic literature of Ireland. Vol. 1. Dublin: M. H. Gill & Son.
- Gilbert, John Thomas (1882). History of the Irish Confederation and the War in Ireland 1641–1643. Historic literature of Ireland. Vol. 2. Dublin: M. H. Gill & Son.
- Gilbert, John Thomas (1885). History of the Irish Confederation and the War in Ireland. Historic literature of Ireland. Vol. 3. Dublin: M. H. Gill & Son. – Covers 1643–1644
- McKeiver Philip (2008), A New History of Cromwell's Irish Campaign, (Advance Press), Manchester, ISBN 978-0-9554663-0-4
- Hull, Eleanor (1931). A History of Ireland.
- Kenyon, John & Ohlmeyer, Jane (editors). The Civil Wars, Oxford 1998, ISBN 019866222X
- Lenihan, Padraig, Confederate Catholics at War, Cork 2001, ISBN 1-85918-244-5
- McCoy, G. A. Hayes. Irish Battles, Belfast 1990, ISBN 0-86281-250-X.
- Meehan, Rev. Charles Patrick (1873). The Confederation of Kilkenny. New York: Felix Rourke.
- Plant, David. "The Confederate War 1641–1652", British Retrieved 23-09-2008
- Plant, David. "The First Ormond Peace, 1646". BCW Project. David Plant.
- Plant, David. "The Confederate War: Timeline 1641–52". BCW Project. David Plant.
- Royle, Trevor (2004), Civil War: The Wars of the Three Kingdoms 1638–1660, London: Abacus, ISBN 0-349-11564-8
- Scott, David (2003). Politics and War in the Three Stuart Kingdoms, 1637–49. Macmillan International Higher Education. ISBN 978-1137207098.
- Scott-Wheeler, James. Cromwell in Ireland, Dublin 1999, ISBN 978-0-7171-2884-6
