= Richard Bellings (courtier) =

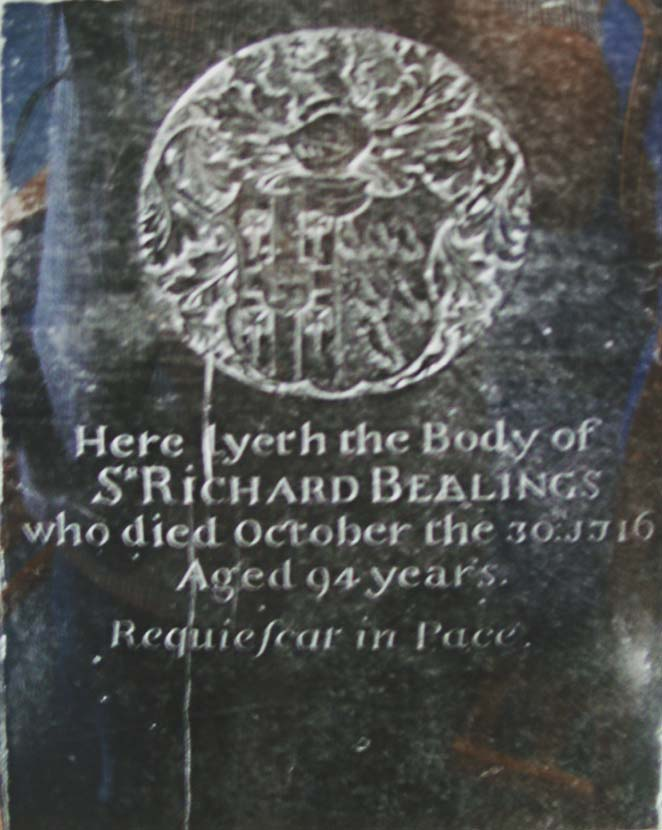
Headstone of Richard Bellings at St Columb Major

Sir Richard Bellings (sometimes spelt Bealings) (1622 – 30 October 1716) was an Irish courtier who served as the Knight secretary to Catherine of Braganza. He was one of a number of Irish Catholics given office in England following the Restoration.

== Diplomatic career ==
In 1662 Charles II sent Sir Richard Bellings to Rome to arrange the terms of England's conversion to Roman Catholicism.

On 1 June 1670 he was one of the signatories of the Secret Treaty of Dover for England. Others who signed it were Henry Bennet, 1st Earl of Arlington, Sir Thomas Clifford, Henry Arundell, 3rd Baron Arundell of Wardour and Jean-Baptiste Colbert for France. That secret treaty engaged Charles II to declare himself a Roman Catholic, for which Louis XIV was to pay him two millions of francs, and, in the event of anticipated disturbances in England, provide military support.

It was the signing of this treaty which effectively created an alliance with England and France and against Holland, in March 1672. This was the second Dutch War of the reign of Charles the Second.

== Family ==
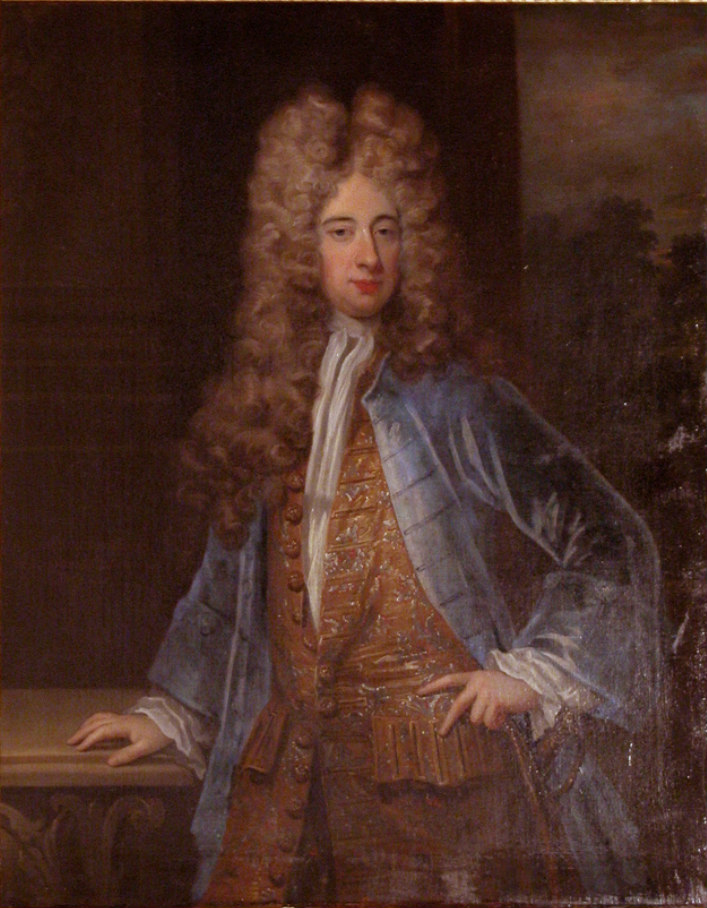
Richard Bellings-Arundell (d.1725), son of Richard and Francis

Bellings's father Richard Bellings (1603–1677) was a lawyer and political figure in 17th century Ireland, while his mother was Margaret Butler, a daughter of Richard Butler, 3rd Viscount Mountgaret.

He married in 1671 Frances Arundell, a daughter of Sir John Arundell of Lanherne and a gentlewoman of Queen Catherine. Their London home was the manor house at Chiswick.

They had two children:

- Richard Bellings-Arundell married Anne Gage, dau. of Joseph Gage of Sherborne Castle
- Helen, married Sir John Hales, 4th Baronet

Their son Richard took the surname Bellings-Arundell, in accordance with his Grandfather's will.

== Death ==
Bellings was buried at St Columb Major in Cornwall. The coat of arms displayed on his headstone is described as "A cross pattée fitchée (Bealing) on an escutcheon of pretence (Arundell); impaling Arundell. Crest: Over esquire's helmet, on a wreath a demi-lion rampant, holding between its paws a cross pattée fitchée."

== Bibliography ==
- Dennehy, Coleman. Restoration Ireland: Always Settling and Never Settled. Ashgate Publishing, 2008
