= Siege of Galway =

Battle during Cromwells conquest of Ireland in 1652

Coordinates: 53.2728°N 9.0417°W

Siege of Galway 1651–1652
- Part of the Cromwellian conquest of Ireland
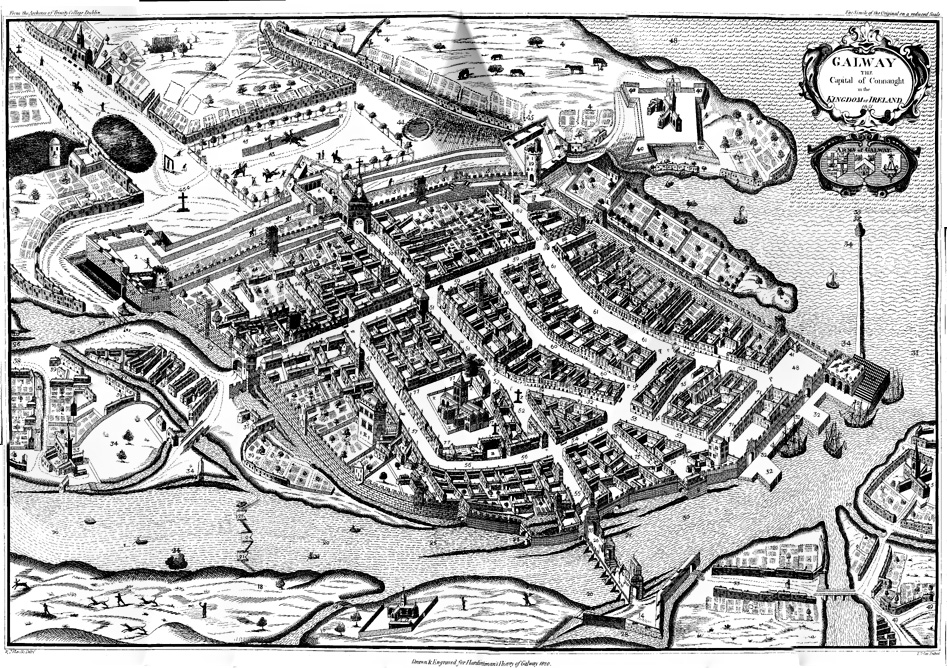
- The heavily fortified city of Galway in 1651
Date	August 1651 – 12 May 1652 (9 months)
Location	Galway, Ireland
Result	Parliamentarian victory

Belligerents
Irish Confederation	Parliamentarians

Commanders and leaders
Thomas Preston	Charles Coote

Strength
2,000 soldiers	6,000–7,000 soldiers

Ireland and Galway

The siege of Galway took place from August 1651 to 12 May 1652 during the Cromwellian conquest of Ireland. Galway was the last city held by Irish Catholic forces in Ireland and its fall signalled the end to most organised resistance to the Parliamentarian conquest of the country.

The English Parliamentarians were commanded by Charles Coote, an English settler who had commanded Parliamentarian forces in the northwest of Ireland throughout the Irish Confederate Wars. Galway was garrisoned by Irish Confederate soldiers under Thomas Preston, many of whom had reached the city after an unsuccessful defence of Waterford.

== Defences of Galway ==
The citizens of Galway had paid for extensive modern bastioned defences during the 1640s and the city was very difficult to assault, given that it was surrounded by Galway Bay on its south side, Lough Corrib to its northwest and Lough Atalia to its east. As a result any assault would be confined to a narrow corridor to the north of the town, allowing the defenders to concentrate their fire. Coote was aware of this, and, after he arrived at Galway in August 1651, he decided to blockade the city rather than to attack it directly. He laid out his siege lines between Lough Atalia and Lough Corrib and stationed a Parliamentary fleet in Galway Bay to cut off supplies or reinforcement from reaching the city. However, Galway remained open to the west and Irish general Richard Farrell was quartered in Connemara with 3,000 more troops.

== The siege ==
In November 1651, after the fall of Limerick, Henry Ireton, the Parliamentarian commander in Ireland, decided to make the capture of Galway the main priority for his forces. As a result, he reinforced Coote and tightened the blockade on Galway. The siege dragged on for seven more months before Galway capitulated. Ulick Burke, 1st Marquess of Clanricarde, who was nominally the supreme commander of the Irish Catholic forces, tried to assemble an army at Jamestown County Leitrim to relieve Galway, but few of the demoralised Irish force around the country responded to his order. In March, a conference of Irish officers in Galway, including Clanricarde, decided to begin negotiations for terms of surrender.

== Surrender ==
Thomas Preston, the military governor of Galway, eventually agreed to surrender the city on 12 May 1652. His position had become impossible due to food shortages and an outbreak of bubonic plague in Galway. Coote agreed to let Preston leave Ireland with most of his troops and enter the Spanish service. The lives and property of the citizens of Galway was respected by the Parliamentarians for the most part, but the Catholic merchant families of the city, the "Tribes of Galway," had to pay heavy fines and were excluded from the municipal government of Galway.

== See also ==
For other sieges of Galway, see Sieges of Galway

== Sources ==
- Bagwell, Richard (1909). Ireland under the Stuarts and under the Interregnum. Vol. 2. London: Longmans, Green, and Co.
- Duffy, Eamonn (1984). "The Siege and Surrender of Galway 1651-1652". Journal of the Galway Archaeological and Historical Society. 39: 115–142. JSTOR 25535533.

== Bibliography ==
- Lenihan, Padraig (2001). Confederate Catholics at War. Cork: Cork University Press. ISBN 978-1859182444.
- Wheeler, James Scott (2000). Cromwell in Ireland. Palgrave Macmillan. ISBN 978-0312225506.
