= Catherine of Braganza =

Queen of England, Scotland and Ireland from 1662 to 1685

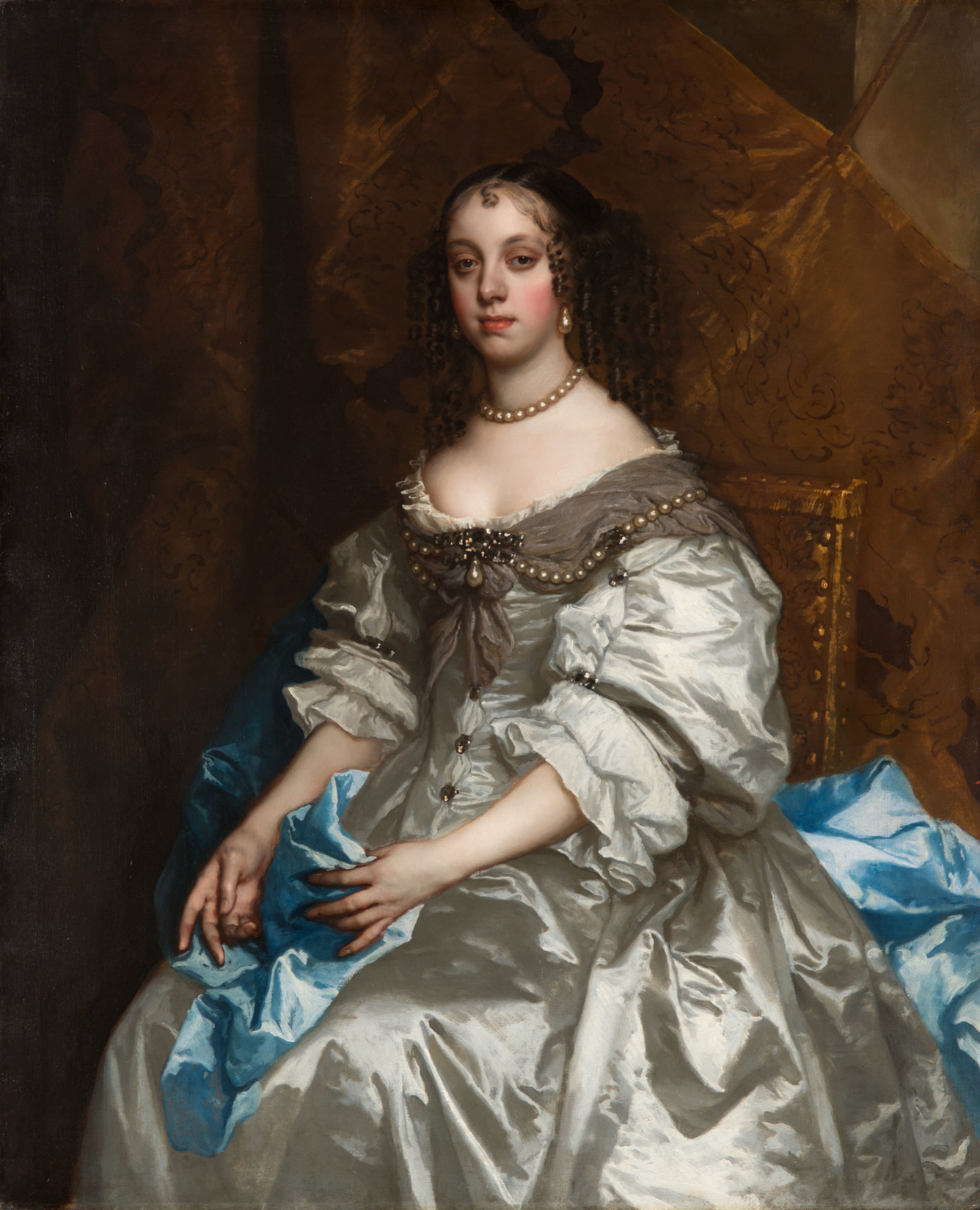
- Portrait, c. 1663–1665

Queen consort of England, Scotland, and Ireland
- Tenure: 21 May 1662 – 6 February 1685
- Born: 25 November 1638; Ducal Palace of Vila Viçosa, Portugal
- Died: 31 December 1705 (aged 67); Bemposta Palace, Lisbon, Portugal
- Burial: Pantheon of the House of Braganza, Lisbon
- Spouse: Charles II of England (m. 1662; died 1685)
- Portuguese: Catarina de Bragança
- House: Braganza
- Father: John IV of Portugal
- Mother: Luisa de Guzmán

Catherine of Braganza (25 November 1638 – 31 December 1705) was Queen of England, Scotland and Ireland from 21 May 1662 to 6 February 1685, through her marriage to Charles II of England. After his death, Catherine returned to Portugal and served as regent for her brother Peter II in 1701, and again in 1704–1705.

She was the daughter of John IV of Portugal, who became the first king from the House of Braganza in 1640, after overthrowing the 60-year rule of the Spanish Habsburgs over Portugal. Her Catholicism made her unpopular in England, and she became an object of attack during the 1678 Popish Plot. The chief instigator, Titus Oates, accused her of plotting to poison the king. These charges, the absurdity of which was soon shown by cross-examination, nevertheless placed Catherine for some time in great danger.

On 28 November 1678, Oates accused Catherine of high treason, and the English House of Commons passed an order for the removal of her and of all Roman Catholics from the Palace of Whitehall. Several further depositions were made against her, and in June 1679 it was decided that she should stand trial, which threat however was lifted by the king's intervention, for which she later showed him much gratitude.

Catherine produced no heirs for Charles, having suffered three miscarriages. Her husband kept many mistresses, most notably Barbara Palmer, 1st Duchess of Cleveland, whom Catherine was forced to accept as one of her Ladies of the Bedchamber. By his mistresses, Charles fathered many children, whom he acknowledged. She is credited with popularising tea drinking in England.

== Personal details ==
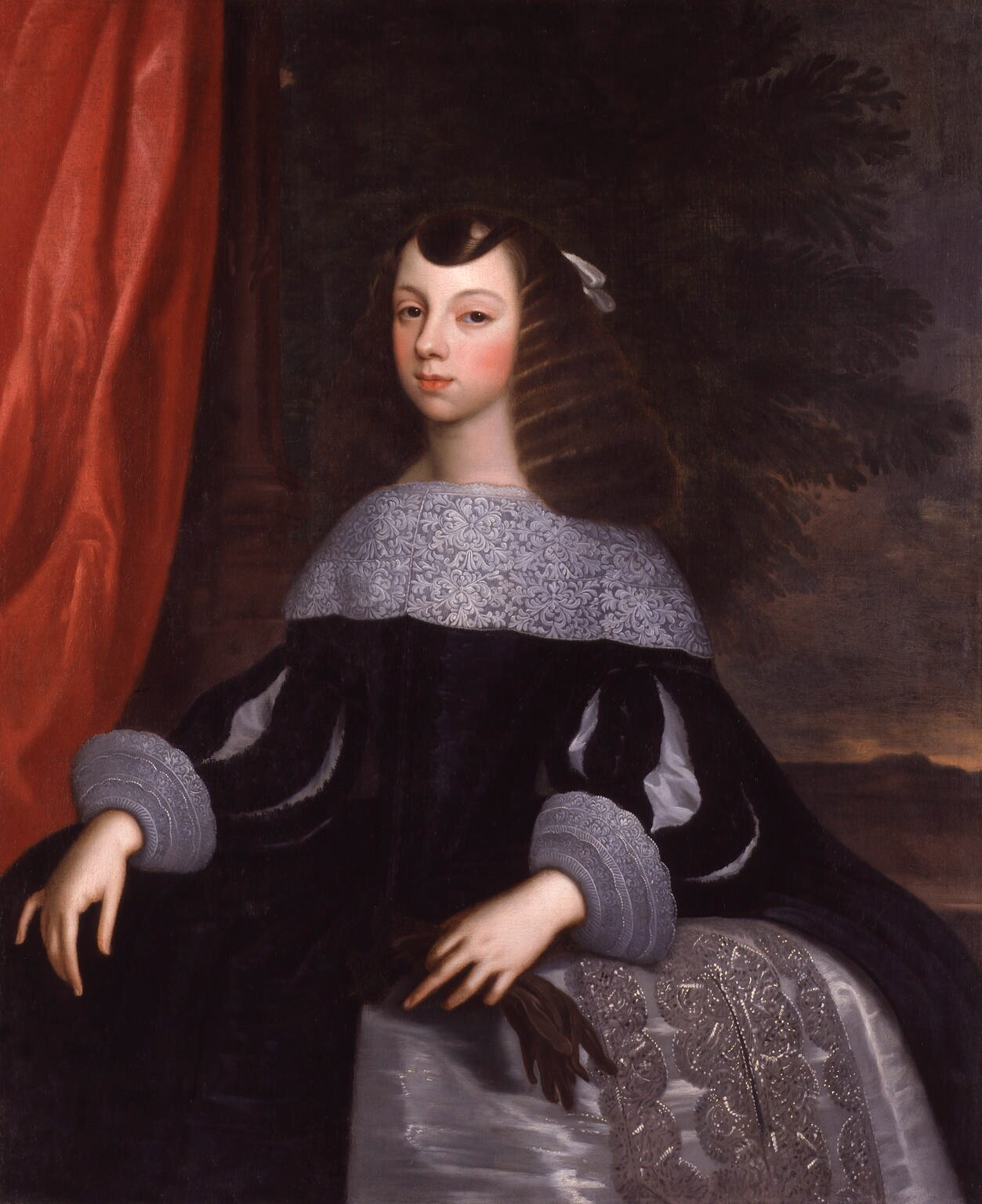
Infanta Catherine of Portugal by Dirk Stoop, 1660–1661

Catherine was born on 25 November 1638 in the Ducal Palace of Vila Viçosa, daughter of Luisa de Guzmán and her husband, the Duke of Braganza. She had an older sister, Joana (1636–1653), and three brothers, Teodósio (1634–1653), Afonso (1643–1683), and Peter (1648–1706).

She apparently spent most of her youth in a convent near the royal palace, where she remained under the supervision of her mother. As was common with daughters of the Portuguese nobility, she had a very sheltered upbringing, one contemporary remarking that she "hath hardly been ten times out of the palace in her life".

== Marriage ==
Following the outbreak of the Portuguese Restoration War, the Duke of Braganza became John IV of Portugal on 1 December 1640, making his daughters suitable spouses for foreign royalty. By 1644, Charles I of England, father of the future Charles II of England, was the only European power to have recognised the Braganza monarchy, and John suggested a marriage alliance with Catherine, which was rejected. After Joana's death in 1653, her younger sister was offered to John of Austria, the duc de Beaufort, and Louis XIV of France.

From 1656, marriage negotiations were led by her mother, who had been appointed regent after John's death the same year. When an alliance with Louis XIV fell through, the 1660 Stuart Restoration led to the reopening of discussions with Charles II. Despite English preference for a Protestant bride and Spanish objections, a Marriage Treaty was signed on 23 June 1661. A key factor in her selection was the dowry, which included Tangier and Bombay, trading privileges in Brazil and the Portuguese East Indies, and two million Portuguese crowns. Louis XIV also promoted the marriage, seeing it as a way to ensure Portuguese independence from Spain.

Catherine arrived at Portsmouth on the evening of 13 May 1662, but did not meet her future husband until 20 May, with varying accounts of the impression she made upon him. Despite suggestions to the contrary, Charles wrote to his chief advisor, Edward Hyde, 1st Earl of Clarendon, that he was "very well satisfied". The following day, 21 May 1662, they were married in two ceremonies, a Catholic one conducted in secret, followed by a public Church of England service.

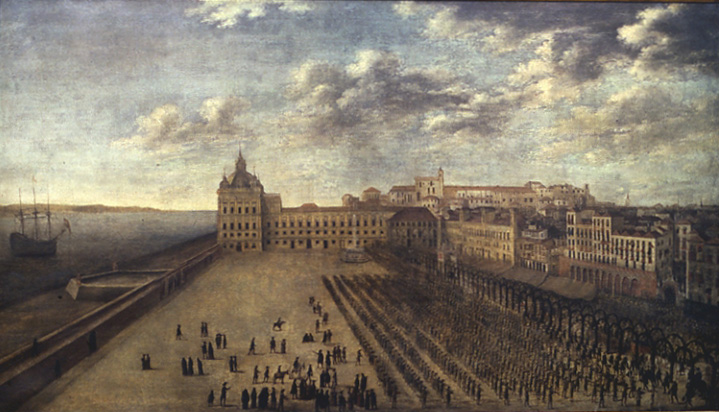
Catherine of Braganza departs Lisbon from the Palace Square, 23 April 1662.

On 23 August, they journeyed from Hampton Court to Whitehall along the River Thames, accompanied by a procession organised by the City of London, which included the Portuguese delegation and many members of the court. At Whitehall, they were received by Henrietta Maria, the Queen Mother, the English court and nobility. The celebrations were accompanied by music, cannon fire and other festivities.

Catherine became pregnant and miscarried at least three times. The primary role of a queen was to produce an heir, and since her husband's numerous illegitimate children made it obvious he was fertile, her position was very difficult. Despite this, Charles insisted she be treated with respect, and took her side against his mistresses when he felt that she was not receiving this. His advisors suggested a divorce, hoping for a new wife who was both Protestant and fertile, but Charles refused, which eventually led to Catherine becoming a target.

== Queen consort (1662–1685) ==
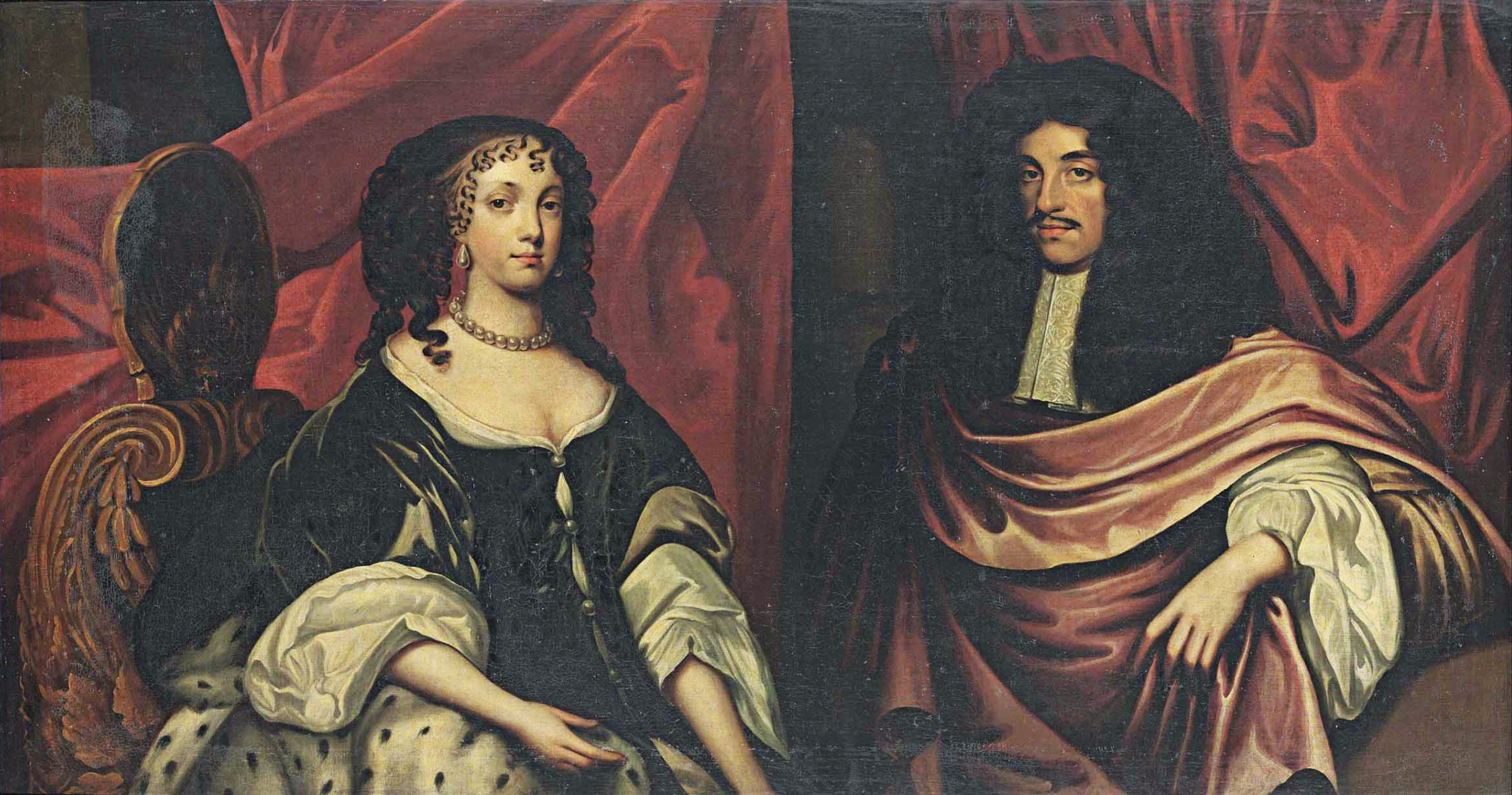
King Charles II and Queen Catherine of Braganza

Her Catholicism not only made Catherine unpopular with the general public, but meant she was barred from Church of England services, and as a result was never crowned queen. An illustration of the problems she faced became apparent soon after their marriage, when Charles appointed his mistress, Barbara Palmer, as her Lady of the Bedchamber. The resulting quarrel was only resolved when the king threatened to send Catherine's personal servants back to Portugal, while the failure of the Portuguese to pay her dowry in full was a continuing source of tension. As early as 1663, the Spanish ambassador was reporting rumours of a possible divorce and that the Portuguese people that came with Catherine were hated at the English court and the city of London.

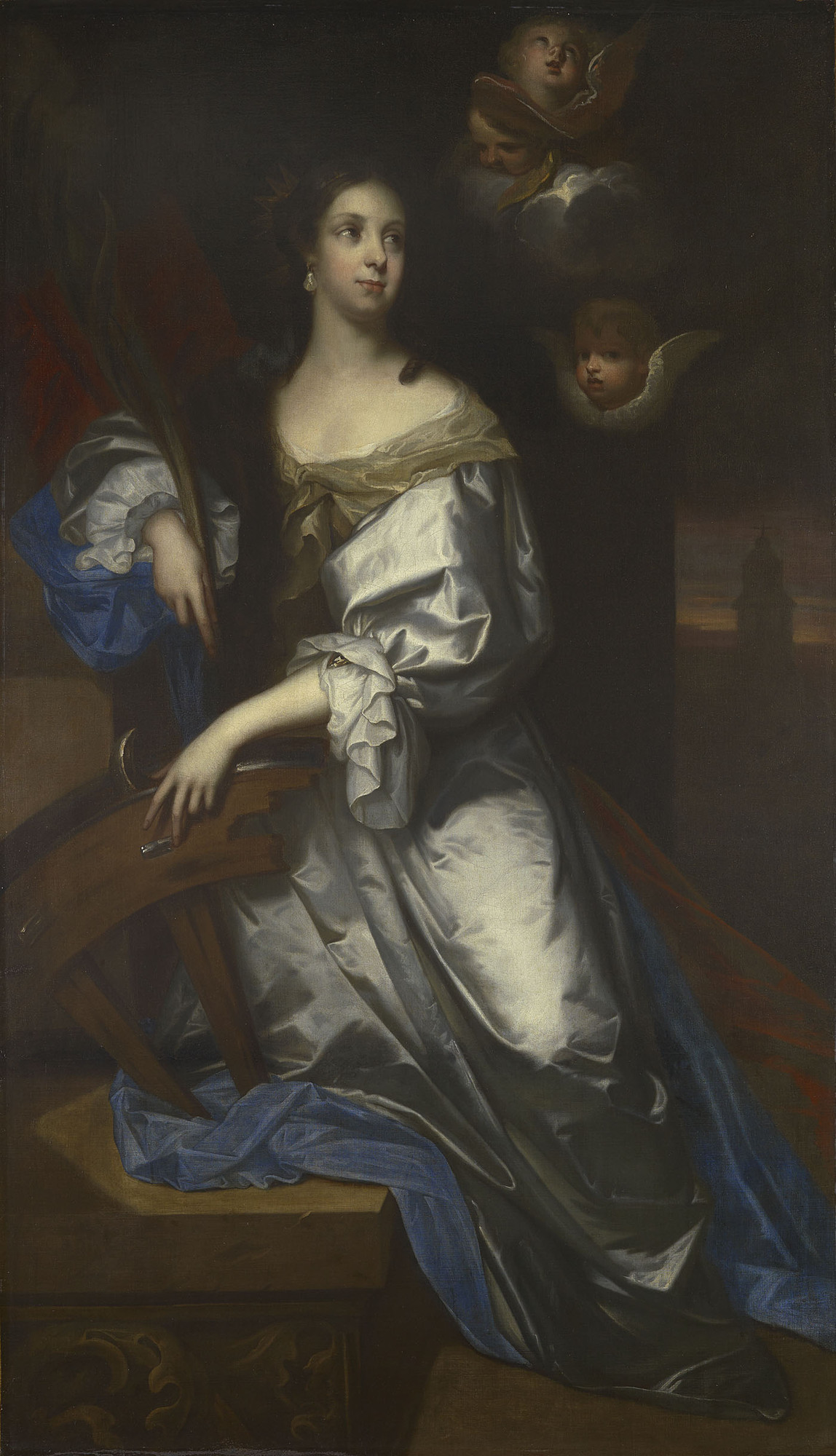
Queen Catherine as St Catherine of Alexandria, by Jacob Huysmans

Although her difficulties with the English language persisted, as time went on, Catherine mellowed and began to enjoy some of the more innocent pleasures of the court. She loved to play cards and shocked devout Protestants by playing on Sundays. She enjoyed dancing and took great delight in organising masques. She had a great love for the countryside and picnics; fishing and archery were also favourite pastimes. In 1670, on a trip to Audley End with her ladies-in-waiting, Catherine attended a country fair disguised as a village maiden, but was soon discovered and, due to the large crowds, forced to make a hasty retreat. In 1664 her favourite painter, Jacob Huysmans, a Flemish Catholic, painted her as St Catherine, it promptly set a trend among court ladies.

She did not involve herself in English politics, instead she kept up an active interest in her native country. Anxious to re-establish good relations with the pope and perhaps gain recognition for Portuguese independence, she sent Richard Bellings, later her principal secretary, to Rome with letters for the pope and several cardinals. In 1669 she involved herself in the last-ditch effort to relieve Candia in Crete, which was under siege by the Ottoman Empire and whose cause Rome was promoting, although she failed to persuade her husband to take any action. In 1670, as a sign of her rising favour with the then-new Pope Clement X, she requested and was granted devotional objects. The same year, Charles II ordered the building of a Royal yacht HMY Saudadoes for her, used for pleasure trips on the River Thames and to maintain communications with the Queen's homeland of Portugal, making the journey twice.

In 1671, strong rumors began circulating that Charles wanted to divorce Catherine because he wished to marry Claudia Felicitas of Austria. This was an unlikely match, because the staunchly Catholic Habsburgs would never have allowed a marriage between one of their members and a Protestant ruler. In any case, Catherine was aware of these rumors, which greatly affected her, according to the Spanish ambassador: "She is very melancholic, suffocated and sad, spending most of the day locked in her bedroom and weeping." At court, they thought this was the right opportunity for her to finally decide to return to Portugal, as the ambassador wrote: "That is why they are trying to cause her trouble in every way, because what they want is to get rid of her. They would like her to make the decision to leave on her own, but I don’t think they will achieve what they want, unless they carry it out by death or violence." Catherine even feared that they wanted to poison her, as the ambassador wrote: "I have been told that all her food is cooked by the friars, so that she doesn't eat a bite that hasn't been prepared by them." According to the Spanish ambassador, in 1673 the English Parliament demanded a divorce and asked the King to search for a Protestant wife. At the same time, the Parliament wanted to establish a law that would forbid any member of the English royal family from marrying a Catholic.

== Catholicism ==
Though known to keep her faith a private matter, her religion and proximity to the king made her the target of anti-Catholic sentiment. Catherine occupied herself with her faith. Her piety was widely known and was a characteristic in his wife that the King greatly admired; in his letters to his sister, Catherine's devoutness is described almost with awe. Her household contained between four and six priests, and in 1665, Catherine decided to build a religious house east of St James's to be occupied by thirteen Portuguese Franciscans of the order of St Peter of Alcantara. It was completed by 1667 and would become known as The Friary.

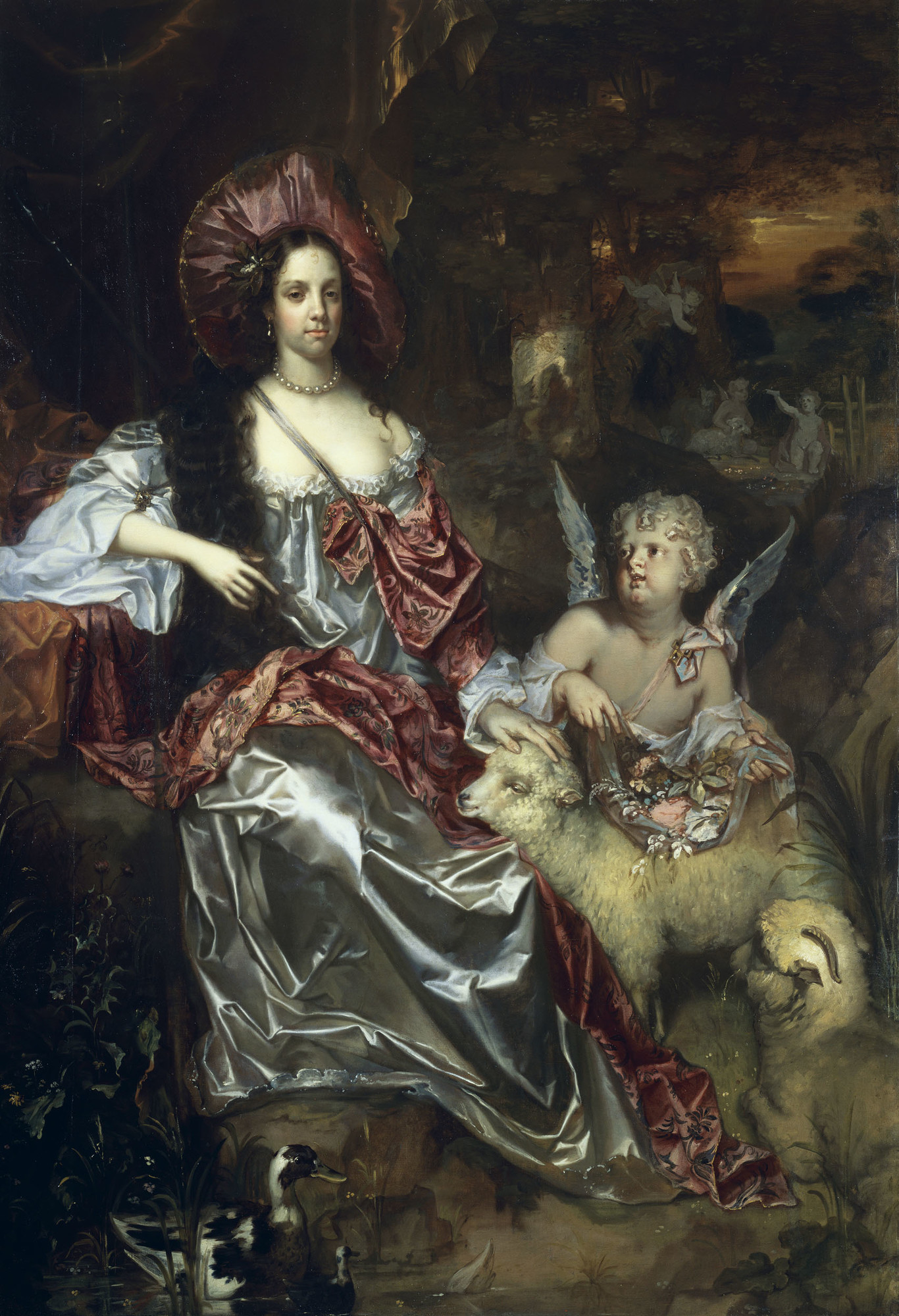
Queen Catherine as a Shepherdess, by Jacob Huysmans

In 1675 the stress of a possible revival of the divorce project indirectly led to another illness, which Catherine's physicians claimed and her husband cannot fail to have noted, was "due as much to mental as physical causes". In the same year, all Irish and English Catholic priests were ordered to leave the country, which left Catherine dependent upon foreign priests. As increasingly harsher measures were put in place against Catholics, Catherine appointed her close friend and adviser, the devoutly Catholic Francisco de Mello, former Portuguese Ambassador to England, as her lord chamberlain. It was an unusual and controversial move but "wishing to please Catherine and perhaps demonstrate the futility of moves for divorce, the King granted his permission. De Mello was dismissed the following year for ordering the printing of a Catholic book, leaving the beleaguered Catherine even more isolated at court". One consolation was that Louise de Kérouaille, Duchess of Portsmouth, who replaced Barbara Palmer as reigning mistress, always treated the Queen with proper deference; the Queen in return showed her gratitude by using her own influence to protect Louise during the Popish Plot.

=== Popish Plot ===
The Test Act 1673 had driven all Catholics out of public office, and anti-Catholic sentiment intensified in the years to come. Although she was not active in religious politics, in 1675 Catherine was criticised for supposedly supporting the idea of appointing a bishop to England who, it was hoped, would resolve the internal disputes of Catholics. Critics also noted the fact that, despite orders to the contrary, English Catholics attended her private chapel.

As the highest-ranking Catholic in the country, Catherine was a target for Protestant extremists, and the Popish Plot of 1678 directly threatened her position. However, Catherine was completely secure in her husband's favour ("she could never do anything wicked, and it would be a horrible thing to abandon her" he told Gilbert Burnet), and the House of Lords, most of whom knew her and liked her, refused by an overwhelming majority to impeach her. Relations between the royal couple became notably warmer: Catherine wrote of Charles's "wonderful kindness" to her and it was noted that his visits to her quarters became longer and more frequent.

== Widowhood ==
During Charles's final illness in 1685, she showed anxiety about his reconciliation with the Roman Catholic faith, and she exhibited great grief at his death. When he lay dying in 1685, he asked for Catherine, but she sent a message asking that her presence be excused and "to beg his pardon if she had offended him all his life." He answered, "Alas poor woman! she asks for my pardon? I beg hers with all my heart; take her back that answer." Later in the same year, she unsuccessfully interceded with James II for the life of James Scott, 1st Duke of Monmouth, Charles's illegitimate son and leader of the Monmouth Rebellion – even though Monmouth in rebellion had called upon the support represented by the staunch Protestants opposed to the Catholic Church.

Catherine remained in England, living at Somerset House, through the reign of James and his deposition in the Glorious Revolution by William III and Mary II. She remained in England partly because of a protracted lawsuit against her former Lord Chamberlain, Henry Hyde, 2nd Earl of Clarendon, over money that she claimed as part of her allowance and that he claimed was part of the perquisite of his office. Catherine had a notable fondness for money; her brother-in-law James, who was himself notably avaricious, remarked that she always drove a hard bargain.

Initially on good terms with William and Mary, Catherine's position deteriorated as the practice of her religion led to misunderstandings and increasing isolation. A bill was introduced to Parliament to limit the number of her Catholic servants, and she was warned not to agitate against the government.

According to Louis de Rouvroy, duc de Saint-Simon, in her widowhood she secretly married his relation Louis de Duras, 2nd Earl of Feversham, despite the earl being a lifelong Protestant.

=== Return to Portugal ===
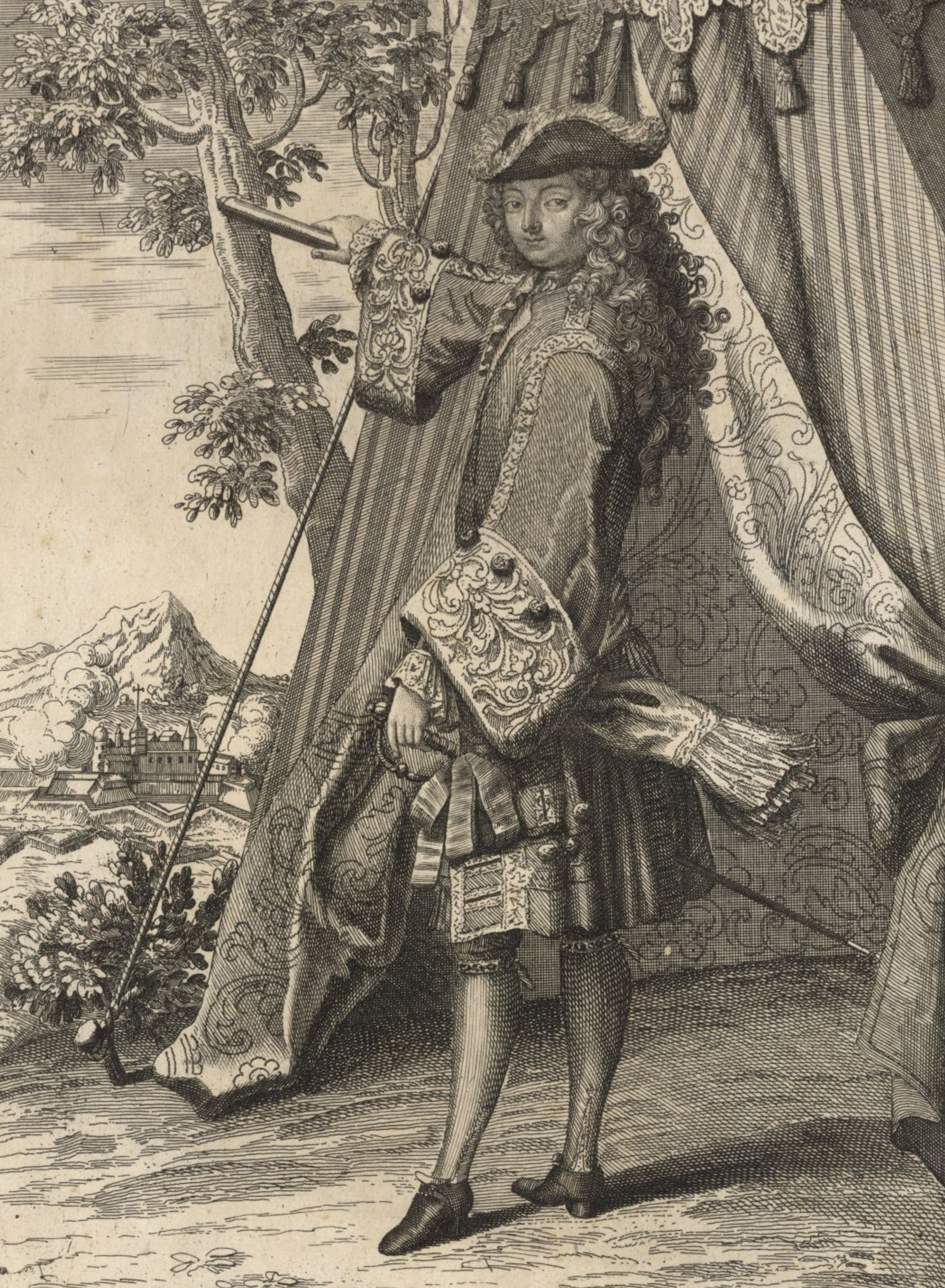
Her nephew John, Prince of Brazil (later king as John V).

Catherine left England in March 1692 and journeyed through France and Spain before arriving in Portugal in January 1693. In 1703, she supported the Methuen Treaty between Portugal and England. She acted as regent for her brother, Peter II, in 1701 and 1704–05. Catherine was a mentor for her nephew, John, Prince of Brazil, later known as the Portuguese Sun King (o Rei-Sol Português) from 1706 onward.

=== Death ===
Catherine died at the Bemposta Palace in Lisbon on 31 December 1705, aged 67, of a colic and was buried at the Pantheon of the House of Braganza.

== Legacy ==
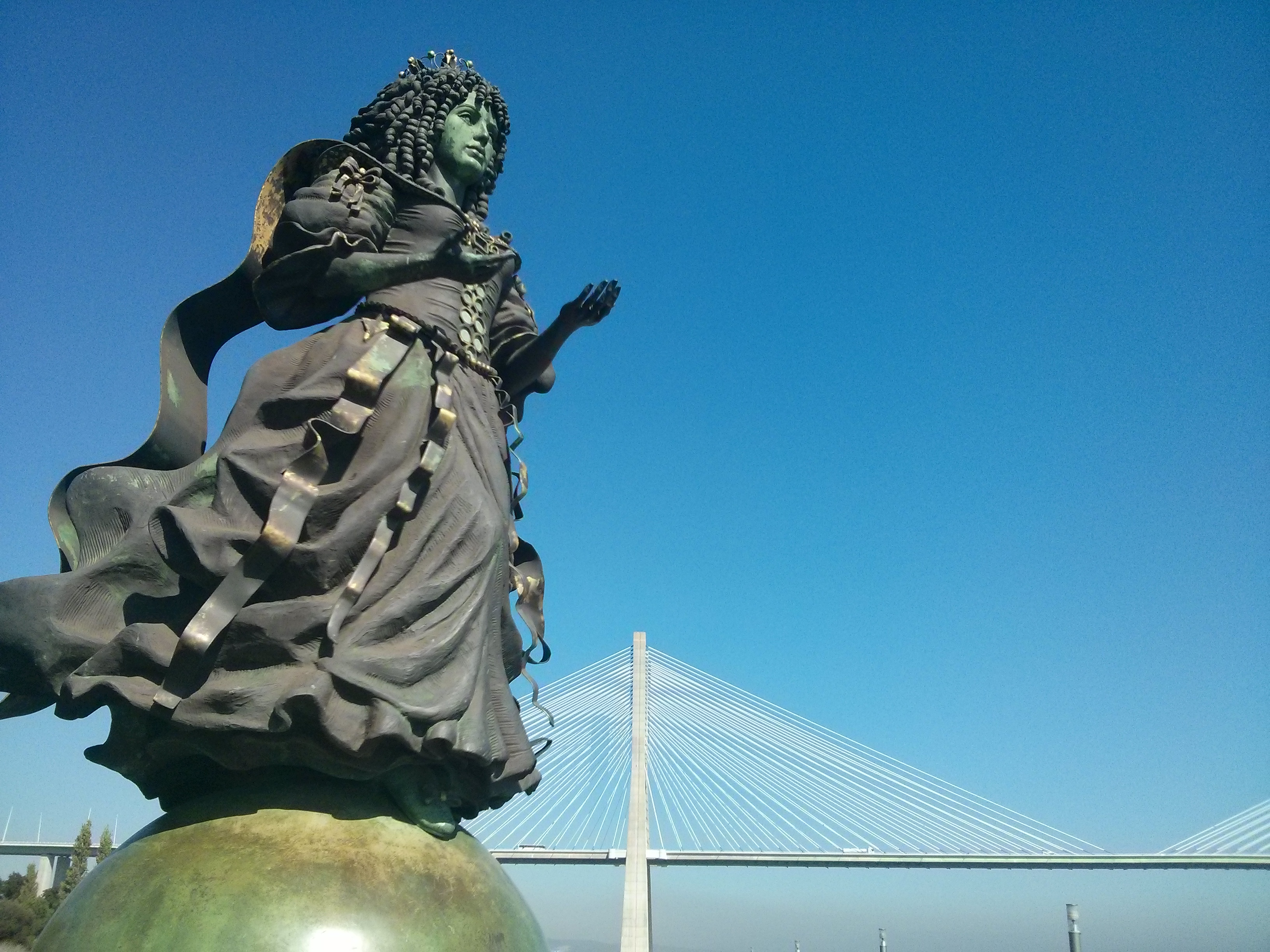
The quarter-scale bronze model installed in 1998 in northeastern Lisbon

Catherine's marriage had an important result for the later history of India and of the British Empire. The Seven Islands of Bombay, which formed part of her dowry, were ceded to the English Crown in 1661 and transferred by Charles II to the East India Company in 1668. Bombay subsequently became an important centre of the company's activities in India and eventually developed into one of the country's major cities.

Catherine is often credited with popularizing tea drinking in Britain.

Queens, a borough of New York City, was supposedly named after Catherine, since she was queen when Queens County was established in 1683. Queens' naming is consistent with those of Kings County (the borough of Brooklyn, originally named after her husband, King Charles II) and Richmond County (the borough of Staten Island, named after his illegitimate son, the 1st Duke of Richmond). However, there is no historical evidence that Queens County was named in her honour, neither is there a document from the time proclaiming it so. Some written histories of Queens skip over the monarch entirely and make no mention of her.

After the tri-centennial of the establishment of Queens County in 1983, the Portuguese-American "Friends of Queen Catherine" society began raising money to erect a 35-foot statue of Queen Catherine on the East River waterfront in Long Island City. Audrey Flack was hired by the society to serve as the sculptor of the proposed statue, and the project received support from several notable public figures in New York City, including Claire Shulman and Donald Trump. However, the project was well into development when opposition to the statue arose from multiple parties; historians objected to the statue on the grounds that there was no evidence that Queens was actually named after her, and thought that the location of the proposed statue was misplaced. Meanwhile, the African-American Bethesda Missionary Baptist Church opposed plans for the statue after allegations that Queen Catherine and the House of Braganza had profited from the slave trade had emerged, while Irish-Americans in Queens were upset that the proposed statue would eclipse the Calvary Cemetery, which had been established for the Irish immigrant community in the United States. As a result of this public opposition, Shulman was forced to withdraw her support, and the statue was never erected. A quarter-scale model survives at the site of Expo '98 in Lisbon, Portugal, facing west across the Atlantic.

Catherine Street, formerly Brydges Street, in central London is named after her.

Novelists, notably Margaret Campbell Barnes in With All My Heart, Jean Plaidy in her Charles II trilogy and Susanna Gregory in her Thomas Chaloner mystery novels, usually portray the Queen in a sympathetic light. So did Alison Macleod in her 1976 biography of the queen, The Portingale and Isabel Stilwell in her 2008 historical novel Catherine of Braganza – The courage of a Portuguese Infanta who became Queen of England.

== Arms ==
The royal arms of the British monarch are impaled with the royal arms of her father. For supporters, she used the crowned lion of England on the dexter side, and on the sinister, the wyvern Vert of Portugal.

Catherine's coat of arms as Queen of England

== Sources ==
- Abbott, Jacob (1904). Charles II. Harper & Brothers.
- Davidson, Lillias Campbell (1908). Catherine of Bragança, Infanta of Portugal, & Queen-Consort of England. London: John Murray.
- Fernández Suárez, José Ramón (1980). "España ante la boda de Carlos II Estuardo y la independencia de Portugal: la diplomacia Española". ES: Revista de filología inglesa (in Spanish) (10): 71–130.
- Fernández Suárez, José Ramón (1982). "La persecución religiosa de Carlos II de Inglaterra a través de los embajadores españoles (1666-1685)". ES: Revista de filología inglesa (in Spanish) (12): 39–98.
- Herman, Eleanor (2005). Sex with Kings: 500 Years of Adultery, Power, Rivalry, and Revenge. William Morrow Paperbacks. ISBN 0-06-058544-7.
- Holmes, Geoffrey (1993). The Making of a Great Power" Late Stuart and Early Georgian Britain, 1660-1722. Longman. ISBN 0582484383.
- Laufer, Guida Myrl Jackson (1999). Women rulers throughout the ages: an illustrated guide. ABC-CLIO. p. 83. ISBN 1-57607-091-3.
- Panton, Kenneth John (2011). Historical Dictionary of the British Monarchy. Scarecrow Press. ISBN 978-0-8108-5779-7.
- Wynne, S.M (2008). "Catherine of Braganza". Oxford Dictionary of National Biography (online ed.). Oxford University Press. doi:10.1093/ref:odnb/4894. (Subscription, Wikipedia Library access or UK public library membership required.)

Catherine of Braganza House of Braganza Cadet branch of the House of Aviz Born: 25 November 1638 Died: 31 December 1705
British royalty
Vacant Title last held by Henrietta Maria of France	Queen consort of England, Scotland and Ireland; 1662–1685	Succeeded by Mary of Modena
