= Hans Hamilton (disambiguation) =

Hans Hamilton (1758–1822) was an Irish MP for County Dublin from 1797 to 1822.

Hans Hamilton may also refer to:

- Sir Hans Hamilton, 1st Baronet (died 1682), Irish MP for County Armagh
- Sir Hans Hamilton, 2nd Baronet (1673–1731), Irish MP for County Armagh and Carlingford
- Hans Hamilton (1674–1728), Irish MP for Killyleagh, Newry and Dundalk
- Hans Hamilton, 2nd Baron HolmPatrick (1886–1942), Irish soldier and peer
- Hans Hamilton, 4th Baron HolmPatrick (born 1955), British politician
