= HolmPatrick =

HolmPatrick is a surname. Notable people with the surname include:

- HolmPatrick, a civil parish within the barony of Balrothery East county Dublin
- Baron HolmPatrick, of HolmPatrick in the County of Dublin, is a title in the Peerage of the United Kingdom
- Hans Hamilton, 4th Baron HolmPatrick (born 1955), British peer and Labour politician
- Ion Hamilton, 1st Baron HolmPatrick PC (1839–1898), Anglo-Irish Member of Parliament
