= Hans Hamilton, 2nd Baron HolmPatrick =

Anglo-Irish soldier and peer (1886–1942)

Hans Wellesley Hamilton, 2nd Baron HolmPatrick DSO MC DL (8 August 1886 – 5 September 1942) was an Anglo-Irish soldier and peer.

Hamilton was born in Abbotstown, Castleknock, the only son of Ion Hamilton, who was raised to the peerage in 1897 as Baron HolmPatrick. His father, grandfather James Hans Hamilton and great-grandfather Hans Hamilton all served as Members of Parliament for County Dublin. His mother, Lady Victoria Alexandrina Wellesley, was the daughter of Major-General Lord Charles Wellesley, granddaughter of the Duke of Wellington, and goddaughter of Queen Victoria.

He attended Eton College followed by the Royal Military Academy Sandhurst. He inherited the barony in 1898 after his father's death. In 1906, he was commissioned in the 16th Lancers, and was adjutant from 1912 to 1914. He was wounded in the First World War, during which he was promoted to captain and was a brigade-major and formerly captain in the Lancers. He was mentioned in dispatches three times, awarded the Military Cross in the 1915 Birthday Honours, and awarded the Distinguished Service Order in the 1919 New Year Honours. He later served as Deputy Lieutenant for County Dublin and was provincial commissioner for the province of Leinster Boy Scouts. He was awarded the Silver Wolf by the Scout Association in 1920 and the 1st Dublin Scout Group (LHO), which operates to this day, took the title Lord Holmpatrick's Own.

On 27 October 1925, he married Lady Edina Dorothy Hope Ainsworth (née Conyngham), fourth daughter of Henry Conyngham, 4th Marquess Conyngham, three months after her divorce from her first husband, Sir Thomas Ainsworth, 2nd Baronet. HolmPatrick died in 1942 at the family seat at Abbotstown, Castleknock. He was survived by one daughter and one son, James Hans Hamilton, who succeeded as the third baron. Lady HolmPatrick died in 1964.

Coat of arms of Hans Hamilton, 2nd Baron HolmPatrick
Crest A demiantelope argent, hoofed and armed or, holding a heart gules, and charged on the shoulder with a mullet of the last. Escutcheon Gules, Three cinquefoils ermine, a mullet's argent for difference; on a chief or a heart of gules. a heart gules. Supporters An antelope argent gorged with a collar flory counterflory or, pendent therefrom an escutcheon ermine charged with a heart gules; sinister, a lion gules gorged with acollar flory counterflory or, pendent therefrom an escutcheonermine, charged with a heart of the first. Motto Latin: (Qualis Ab Incepto) The same as from the beginning.

Peerage of the United Kingdom
Preceded by Ion Hamilton	Baron HolmPatrick; 1898–1942	Succeeded by James Hans Hamilton
