= North Dublin =

North Dublin may refer to:

== Geography ==
- Northside, Dublin, the part of Dublin city north of the River Liffey
- Fingal, the north part of County Dublin

== Parliamentary constituencies ==
- North Dublin (UK Parliament constituency), 1885 to 1922
- Dublin North (Dáil constituency), 1923 to 1937 and 1981 to 2016
