= 1874 County Dublin by-election =

UK Parliamentary by-election

- 18 March 1874
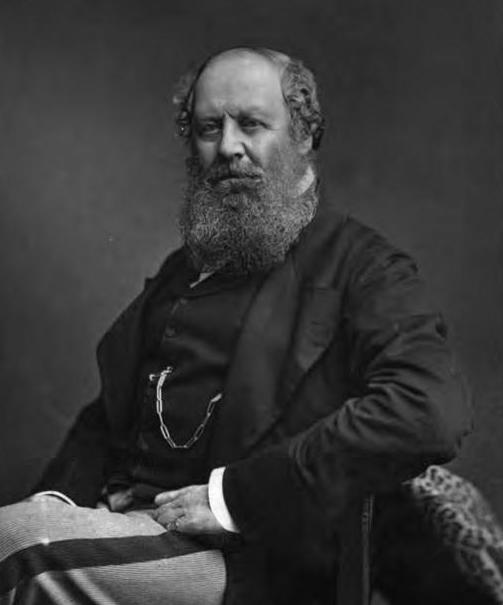

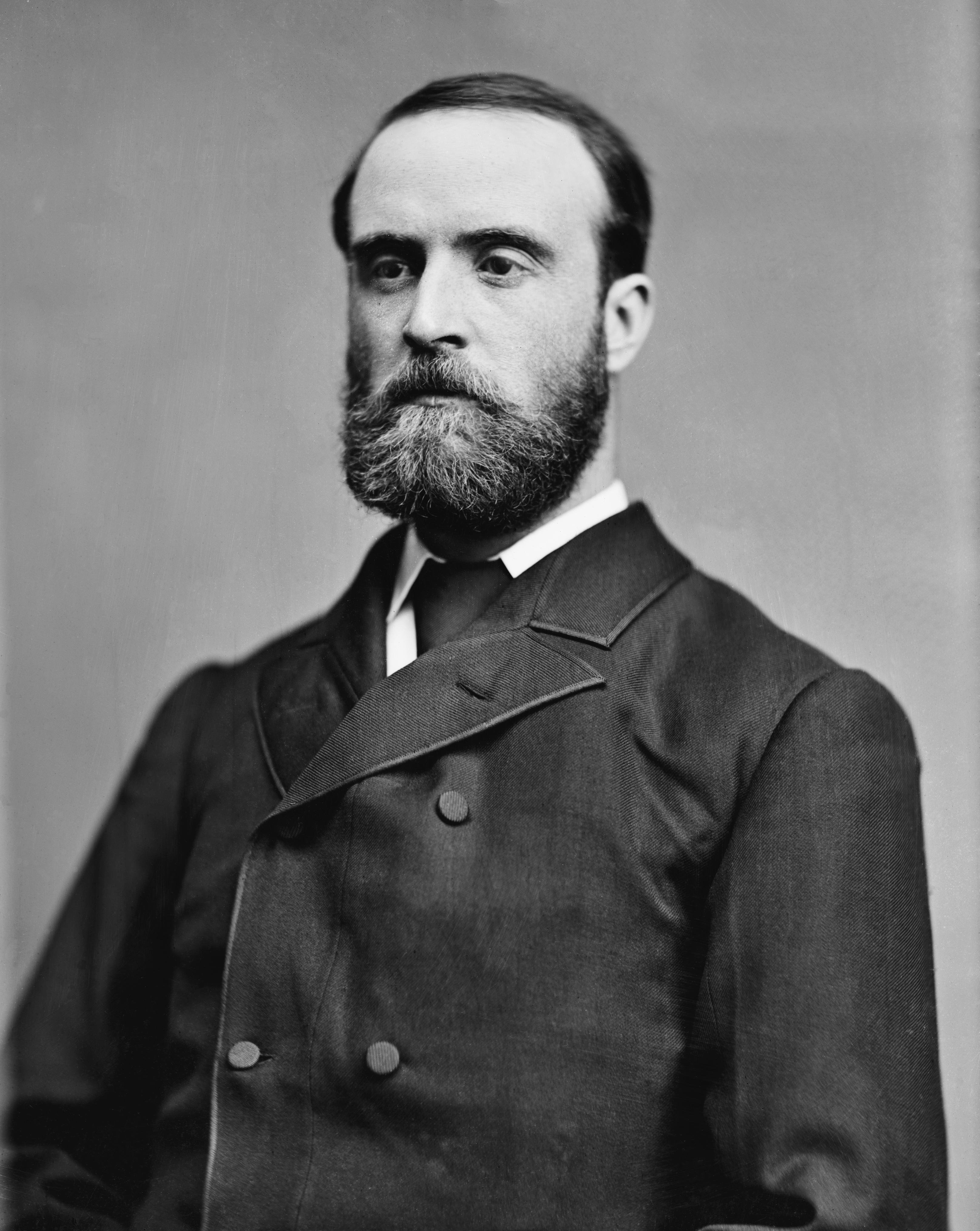
Candidate	Thomas Edward Taylor	Charles Stewart Parnell
Party	Irish Conservative	Home Rule
Popular vote	2,183	1,235
Percentage	63.9%	36.1%
- Location of County Dublin constituency within Ireland
MP before election
Thomas Edward Taylor
Irish Conservative
Subsequent MP
Thomas Edward Taylor
Irish Conservative

A 1874 by-election was held on 18 March 1874 in County Dublin due to the incumbent Conservative MP, Thomas Edward Taylor, becoming Chancellor of the Duchy of Lancaster, requiring a ministerial by-election. It was retained by the incumbent.

1874 County Dublin by-election Registered electors 4,193
Party	Candidate	Votes	%	±%
Irish Conservative	Thomas Edward Taylor	2,183	63.9	N/A
Home Rule	Charles Stewart Parnell	1,235	36.1	New
Majority		948	27.8	N/A
Turnout		3,418	81.5	N/A
Irish Conservative hold		Swing	N/A	
