= Dublin South =

Dublin South may refer to:

- South Dublin County
- Dublin South (Dáil constituency)
- South Dublin (UK Parliament constituency) (1885–1922)
