= Sir Frederick Falkiner, 1st Baronet =

Irish politician

Sir Frederick John Falkiner, 1st Baronet (8 April 1768 – 14 September 1824) was an Irish baronet and politician.

He was the eldest son of Daniel Falkiner, grandson of Daniel Falkiner, and his wife Dorothy Faure, daughter of Henry Faure. Falkiner was educated at Trinity College Dublin and graduated with a Bachelor of Arts. In 1804, he raised the 100th Regiment of Foot, and one year later, after the authorisation of King George III the United Kingdom and the integration into the British Army, he became its colonel.

In 1791, Falkiner was elected to the Irish House of Commons for Athy and sat for it until 1798. Subsequently, he was returned for County Dublin until the Act of Union in 1801 and thereafter for County Dublin to the British House of Commons until 1807. He stood for Carlow in 1812 and represented the constituency until 1818. Falkiner was secretary to the Order of St Patrick, and was appointed High Sheriff of County Dublin in 1801. On 21 December 1812, he was created a baronet, of Abbotstown, in the County of Dublin.

On 23 October 1798, he married Anne Frances Gardiner, daughter of Sackville Gardiner. Falkiner died without issue and the baronetcy became extinct.

Parliament of Ireland
Preceded by Lord Henry FitzGerald; Arthur Ormsby	Member of Parliament for Athy; 1791–1798; With: Arthur Ormsby	Succeeded by William Hare; Richard Hare
Preceded by John Finlay; Sir Edward Newenham	Member of Parliament for County Dublin; 1798 – 1801; With: Hans Hamilton	Succeeded by Parliament of the United Kingdom
Parliament of the United Kingdom
New constituency	Member of Parliament for County Dublin; 1801 – 1807; With: Hans Hamilton	Succeeded by Hans Hamilton; Richard Wogan Talbot
Preceded by Andrew Strahan	Member of Parliament for Carlow; 1812 – 1818	Succeeded by Charles Harvey-Saville-Onley
Military offices
New regiment	Colonel of the 100th Regiment of Foot; 1804–1818	Regiment disbanded
Baronetage of the United Kingdom
New creation	Baronet (of Abbotstown); 1812–1824	Extinct
Preceded by Fletcher baronets	Falkiner baronets of Abbotstown; 21 December 1812	Succeeded by Hobhouse baronets
