= An Coireán =

An Coireán is the name in Irish (meaning 'little cauldron') of two places in Ireland:

- Waterville, Dublin, a housing development on the outskirts of Dublin city
- Waterville, County Kerry, a small seaside town in County Kerry
