= Sheriff of County Dublin =

The Sheriff of County Dublin (or (High) Sheriff of the County of Dublin) was the Sovereign's judicial representative in County Dublin. Initially, an office for a lifetime, assigned by the Sovereign, the Sheriff became an annual appointment following the Provisions of Oxford in 1258. The first recorded Sheriff was Ralph Eure, appointed in that year. The next recorded Sheriff was Sir David de Offington, who was Sheriff in 1282. Besides his judicial importance, the sheriff had ceremonial and administrative functions and executed High Court Writs.

The first Shrievalties were established before the Norman Conquest of England in 1066 and date back to Saxon times. In 1908, an Order in Council made the Lord-Lieutenant the Sovereign's prime representative in a county and reduced the Sheriff's precedence. Despite however that the holder of the office retained his responsibilities for the preservation of law and order in a county.

== Sheriffs of County Dublin ==
- 1258: Ralph Eure
- 1280: David de Callan
- 1282: Sir David de Offington
- 1299: Rythery Fitzjohn
- 1343: Adam Talbot
- 1407: Walter Tyrrell
- 1409: Walter Tyrrell (second term)
- 1423: John Talbot
- 1425: Walter Tyrrell (third term)
- 1426: Robert de Holywood of Artane
- 1456: Robert St Lawrence, 3rd Baron Howth
- 1465: James Blakeney
- 1556: James Luttrell
- 1560: Sir Christopher Barnewall
- 1565: Christopher Fagan
- 1569: Robert Bice
- 1575: Richard Fagan
- 1609 Sir Thomas FitzWilliam
- 1618 Thomas Orpie
- 1639: Philip Hore
- 1642: Robert Bysse
- 1655: William Coddington
- 1655: Sir Daniel Bellingham, 1st Baronet
- 1684: Sir Richard Bellingham, 2nd Baronet
- 1691: John Allen, 1st Viscount Allen
- 1695: Dixie Coddington
- 1710: Richard Bolton of Brazeel
- 1713: Clement Barry
- 1716: Richard Bolton of Brazeel
- 1721: John Falkiner
- 1723: Edward Bolton
- 1726: Richard Essington of Clonee, Co. Meath, and Tubber, Co. Dublin
- 1733: William Ussher
- 1743: Mark Synott
- 1746: John Gore Booth
- 1755: Edward Maunsell
- 1760: Sir Simon Bradstreet, 2nd Baronet
- 1762: Sir Henry Echlin, 3rd Baronet
- 1763: Sir Edward Newenham
- 1773: Sir George Ribton, 2nd Baronet
- 1776: (Sir) Patrick King
- 1777: Sir Michael Cromie, 1st Baronet of Stacombrie
- 1781: Sir John Stuart Hamilton, 1st Baronet of Dunamana
- 1782: William Fortie, of Fortie's Grove
- 1783: Somerville Pope Stephens, of Clondalkney
- 1784: Henry Steevens Reily of Prussia St in the City of Dublin
- 1785: William Holt of Cramlin
- 1787: Sir John Traill
- 1790: George Talbot, later Sir George Talbot, 3rd Baronet of Chart Park
- 1794: (Sir) St George O'Kelly

=== 19th century ===
- 1801: Sir Frederick John Falkiner, 1st Baronet of Abbotstown
- 1803: Hans Hamilton of Sheephill Park
- 1804: Luke White of Luttrellstown Castle, co. Dublin.
- 1805: Robert Alexander
- 1806: Robert Shaw of Bushy Park
- 1807: John Hamilton
- 1808: Richard Manders
- 1809: Alexander Hamilton and Hans Blackwood
- 1810: John Arthur
- 1811: John Campbell
- 1812: William Rathbone
- 1813: Sir Henry Wilkinson
- 1813: Jacob West
- 1814: John Hamilton
- 1815: William James Alexander
- 1816: John James Hamilton
- 1817: Sir Compton Domville
- 1818: Eyre Tilson Coote, 3rd Baron Castle Coote
- 1819: Richard Vorschoyle
- 1820: Sir Richard Steele, 3rd Baronet
- 1821: Charles Cobbe
- 1822: George Woods
- 1823: John Kennedy
- 1824: Sir John Sheppey Ribton, 3rd Baronet of Woodville
- 1825: John David Latouche of Marley
- 1827: Thomas Richard Needham, of Edmondsbury, Bank, Foster-place
- 1828: The Honorable Edward Wingfield, of Cork Abbey. Bray
- 1829: George Hampden Evans
- 1831: Sir Josiah Coghill, 3rd Baronet
- 1832: James Hans Hamilton,
- 1833: Richard Mandeks
- 1834: Fenton Hort (1794-1873)
- 1835: Lord William Brabazon
- 1836: Sir William Henry Palmer, 3rd Baronet, of Palmerstown
- 1838: John Michael Henry Fock, 3rd Baron de Robeck
- 1839: Sir Henry Meredyth Jervis White Jervis, Baronet (or 1837)
- 1840: Thomas White of Woodlands
- 1841: Charles Cobbe
- 1842: Arthur Burgh Crofton of Roebuck Castle
- 1843: David Charles La Touche
- 1844: William Eaton Caldbeck
- 1845: Hon. Edward Preston, Gormanstown Castle
- 1846: Edward Lawless, 3rd Baron Cloncurry
- 1847:
- 1848: Robert Shaw of Kimmage House.
- 1849: John Ennis, of Merrion Square.
- 1850: Robert Alexander, of Garristown, Ashbourne.
- 1853: Valentine O'Brien O'Connor
- 1854: William St Lawrence, 4th Earl of Howth.
- 1856: St. John Butler.
- 1856: Thomas Baker of Courtlough, Balbriggan.
- 1858: Charles Vesey Colthurst-Vesey of Lucan House
- 1859: Sir John Joscelyn Coghill, 4th Baronet.
- 1860: Francis Richard Brooke.
- 1861: Luke White, 2nd Baron Annaly of Annaly and Rathcline.
- 1862: George Hayward Lindsay
- 1863: Phineas Riall.
- 1865: Jenico Preston, 14th Viscount Gormanston.
- 1866: Sir Edward Wingfield Verner, 4th Baronet.
- 1867: Malachi Strong Hussey of Westown.
- 1870: Nathaniel Hone of St Douloughs.
- 1871: Thomas Fulton Caldbeck.
- 1872: John Hely Hutchinson of Seafield and Lissen Hall.
- 1873: Robert Warren of Ballydonarea.
- 1875: Sir Roger William Henry Palmer, 5th Baronet.
- 1875: Sir Edward Hudson Hudson-Kinahan.
- 1876:
- 1877:
- 1878: Major Richards Wilson Hartley, Beechpark, Clonsilla.
- 1880: John Jameson of St Marnocks.
- 1881: Athanasius Francis William Geoffrey De Geneville Cusack.
- 1882:
- 1885: Edward Guinness.
- 1886: Gibson Black.
- 1887:
- 1888: Sir Percy Raymond Grace, 4th Baronet of Boley, Monkstown.
- 1889: Lewis John Roberts Riall of Old Conna Hill.
- 1890: John Hatchell of Fortfield House.
- 1891:
- 1895: John Gardiner Nutting of Gort Muire.
- 1896:
- 1897: Thomas Lake Plunkett.
- 1898: Sir George Frederick Brooke, 1st Baronet.
- 1899: Henry Seymour Guinness.
- 1900: James William Henry Claud Cusack.

=== 20th century ===
- 1900: Sir William Goulding, 1st Baronet.
- 1901: Herbert Winnington Domvile.
- 1902: Andrew Jameson of Sutton House.
- 1903: Eyre Coote.
- 1904: Edward Venables Vernon of Clontarf Castle.
- 1906: Sir James Talbot Power, 5th Baronet of Leopardstown Park.
- 1908: Charles Nicholas Colthurst-Vesey.
- 1910: Robert Frederick Stewart Colvill.
- 1911: Lieut-Col. D'Oyly Cade Battley of Belvedere Hall.
- 1912: Sir Stanley Herbert Cochrane, 1st Baronet of Corke Lodge.
- 1913:
- 1919: Thomas Kennedy Laidlaw.
- 1920: Richard St. John Jefferyes Colthurst (later 8th Baronet).
