= Barry Close =

British East India Company general (1756–1813)

Sir Barry Close Baronet
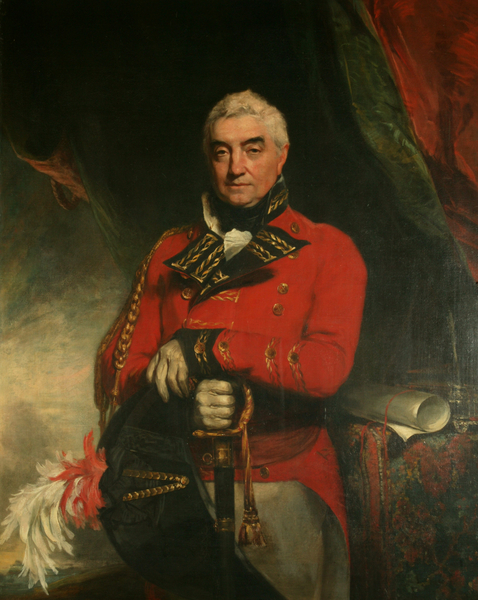
- Portrait by Martin Archer Shee, at the Manchester city gallery.
- Born: 3 December 1756; Armagh, County Armagh, Ireland
- Died: 12 April 1813 (aged 56); London, Middlesex, United Kingdom
- Burial place: St Marylebone Parish Church
- Military career
- Commands: 20th Madras Infantry
- Conflicts: defence of Tellicherry; Siege of Seringapatam (1792);

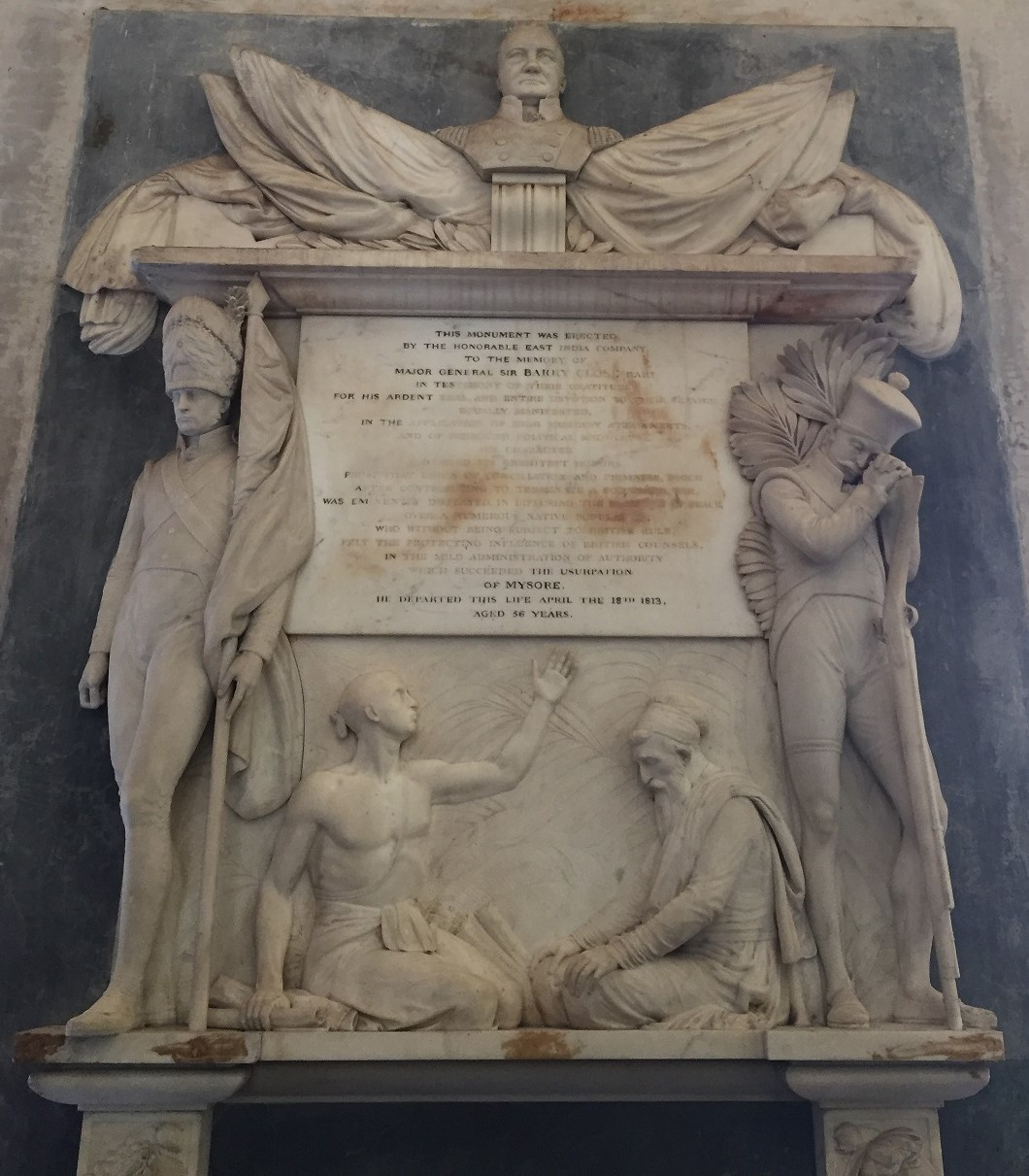
Memorial by John Flaxman in St. Mary's Church, Madras for Close, showing a Brahmin and a Muslim grieving.

Sir Barry Close, 1st Baronet (3 December 1756 – 12 April 1813) was an army general in the East India Company and a political officer.

== Life ==
Barry Close was born at Elm Park in Armagh, the third son of Maxwell Close and his wife Mary. The family had moved from Yorkshire to Ireland during the reign of Charles I. Barry joined the Madras army as a fifteen-year-old cadet in 1771 after his early schooling in Ireland. He was commissioned an ensign with the Madras infantry in 1773 and rose to become an adjutant of the 20th battalion in 1777. He saw action in the defence of Tellicherry against Hyder Ali and his General Sirdar Khan in 1780. Close's treatment of the sepoys and his leadership prevented his battalion from mutinying unlike several others. He gained a reputation as a linguist and chose to conduct all business with the sepoys in their own language.

Close demonstrated his diplomatic talent when he served under James Stuart, commander-in-chief of the Madras army who was dismissed by Lord Macartney for not attacking the French. By handling this situation he rose in reputation and after becoming a captain on 18 December 1783, he was appointed to negotiate with Tipu Sultan. He served as deputy adjutant-general of the Madras army during the Siege of Seringapatam. Following this he was appointed adjutant-general and gazetted a lieutenant-colonel on 29 November 1797. Close founded the Madras military fund and promoted the formation of a permanent police committee to improve the law and order of Madras. He was then posted to deal with the Mysore rulers drafting treaties with them. Close was made he first resident in the court of Mysore. He was also to negotiate with the nawab of Arcot and was later posted resident at the Peshwa court in Poona. His knowledge of Persian and several Indian languages helped him in these assignments. While in Poona in August 1805 he was promoted to the rank of colonel in the 20th Madras native infantry. He intervened to solve a mutiny in Madras by British officers by talking to the sepoys in their language exhorting them not to follow the dissenting officers.

Close was promoted to major-general in 1810 while he was on leave in Britain. Robert Hobart, 4th Earl of Buckinghamshire, who was then the President of the Board of Control, exerted his influence to have Close created a baronet by the prince regent on 12 December 1812. The title became extinct on Close's death in London on 12 April 1813, and he was buried at St Marylebone Parish Church, Middlesex.

The town of Closepet near Mysore was named after him although it was later renamed Ramanagara.

Baronetage of the United Kingdom
New creation	Baronet (of Mysore); 1812–1813	Extinct
Preceded by Hunter baronets	Close baronets of Mysore; 12 December 1812	Succeeded by Fletcher baronets
