= Waterville, Dublin =

Housing development in Dublin, Ireland

Coordinates: 53.3942°N 6.3726°W

Waterville (Irish: An Coireán) is a housing development near Dublin city, within Fingal, Ireland. The development was built between 2002 and 2008 as well as between 2013 and 2016 (Brandon Square and Rossan Court) on the edge of the Abbotstown demesne, close to Blanchardstown village. The development lies within the townland of Deanestown in the civil parish of Castleknock.

== History ==
The area was developed by Granbrind Ltd on land acquired from the Eastern Health Board. The land was previously owned successively by the Barons of Castleknock, Baronets of Abbotstown and the barons HolmPatrick. These lands formed the principal seat in the civil parish which was part of the barony of Castleknock.

Waterville is located on the southern edge of Abbotstown Demesne which remained in the ownership of the Tyrell family until about 1400 when Thomas Sergent and his wife Joan Tyrell, sister to the last Tyrell Baron of Castleknock, were in residence. By the 17th century, they had passed to the Sir John Dungan who owned one thatched house, several cottages and an old church at Abbotstown. Later, the lands at Abbotstown were owned by the Clements family, ancestors to the Earls of Leitrim.

Among the families to live on the lands at Waterville was the Falkiner family, ennobled as "Baronets of Abbotstown" in 1812. The Falkiners married into the Hamilton family who had lands in the neighbouring townland of Sheephill. In 1832, both estates were amalgamated by the Hamiltons and a new residence, Abbotstown House, was built as the family seat.

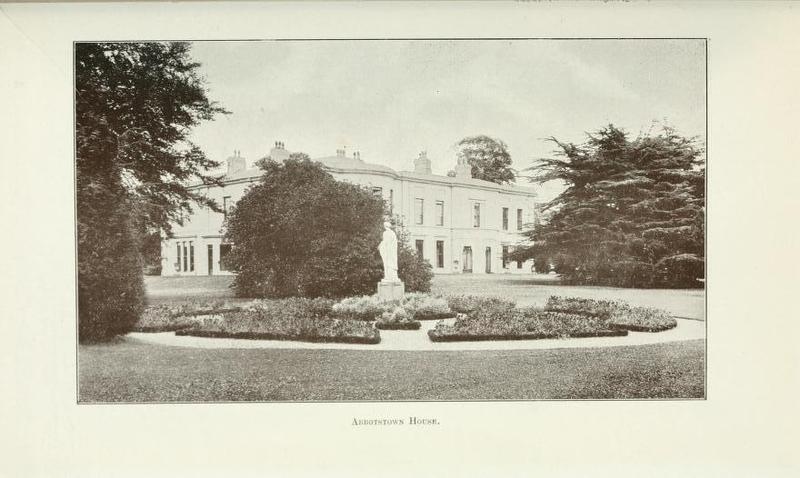
Abbottstown House, Castleknock, 19th century

Ion Trant Hamilton was ennobled by Queen Victoria as Baron HolmPatrick. Abbotstown House remained the seat of the barons until 1947 when James Hans Hamilton, 3rd Baron HolmPatrick (1928–1991), lost part of his lands under a Compulsory Purchase Order to allow for the building of James Connolly Memorial Hospital. Later, Lord HolmPatrick sold the remaining lands at Abbotstown and Sheephill to the Marine Institute of Ireland. The institute was located at Abbotstown House until 2005 when the house was acquired for the National Sports Campus. In the late 1990s half of the lands under the ownership of the health board were sold for development in order to finance the redevelopment of the hospital buildings.

== Location and name ==
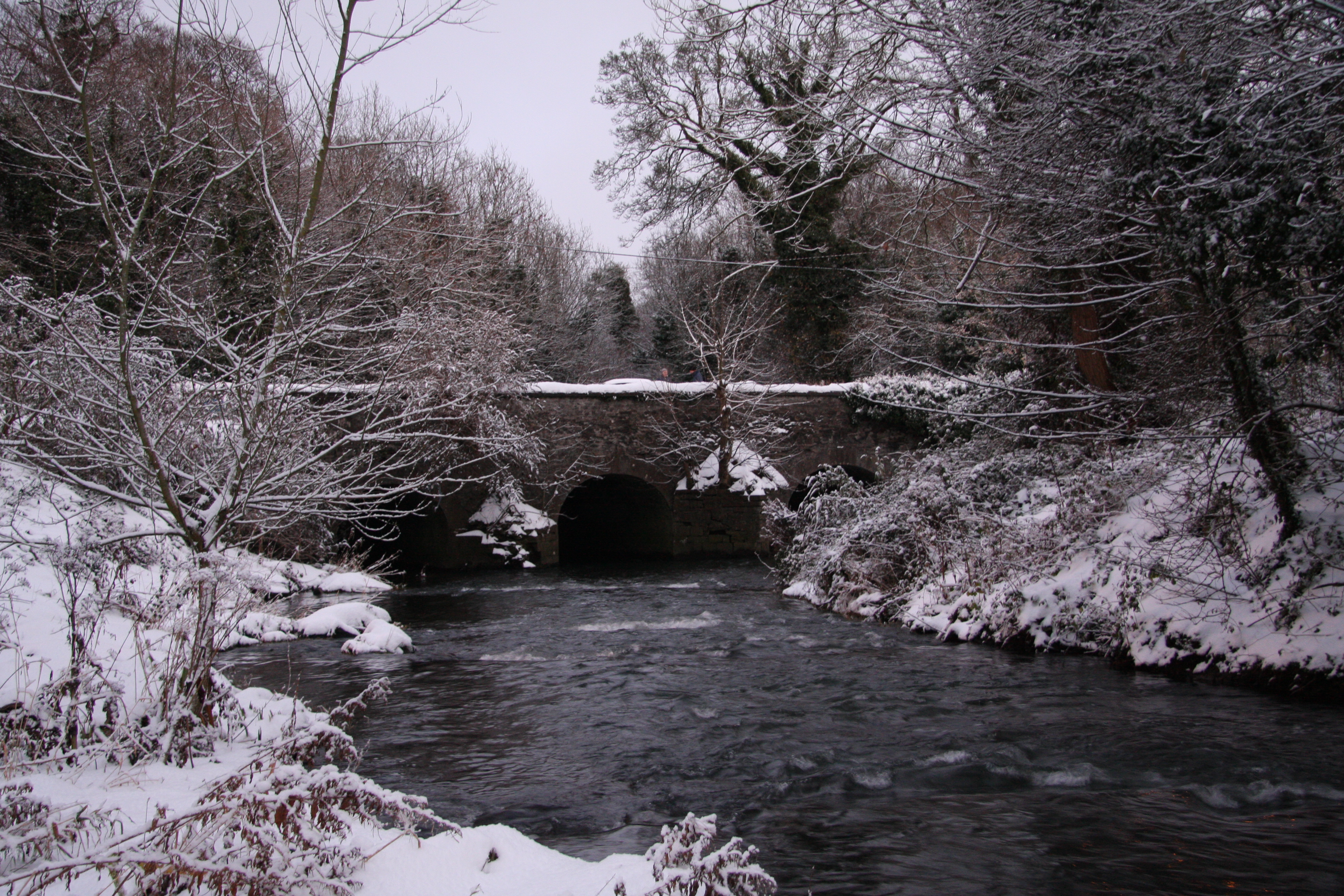
The Tolka River flows along the southern edge of Waterville Park.

The development of 1500 homes at Deanestown and Sheephill was called Waterville due to its proximity to the River Tolka. Waterville lies on the northern banks of the Tolka, covering about 50 acres of land.

It is bordered to the south by the Navan Road (N3), to the west by the Snugborough Road (R843), to the north by the playing fields of the National Sports Campus and to the east by Connolly Hospital in the townland of Abbotstown. Waterville is approx. 9 km from the centre of Dublin city and 2.5 km from Castleknock railway station. Each area within Waterville is privately owned and managed, and each is named after an Irish coastal promontory or island.

Many of the developments in Waterville were built around a central green, while the overall development was built in an integrated fashion merging with the established forestry and parklands.

Waterville also has a 25-acre park called Waterville Park where there is a lake with swans and ducks. The lake also has an Island in it and another lake above it. The park also has a playground.

Waterville also has a shop and a creche.

== Access and public transport ==
Situated adjacent to the N3 and the M50, Waterville is nine kilometres from the city centre. It is connected to the M3 by a link road.

Public transport services include the following bus routes:- 38, 38a, 38b, 39, 39a, 70, 76a, 220, 238, and 239. Castleknock railway station is the nearest train station.
