= George Hampden Evans =

Irish politician

The Rt.Hon. George Hampden Evans (died 2 July 1842) was an Irish politician.

== Biography ==
George was the eldest son of Captain Hampden Evans and his wife Margaret née Davis of Portrane, County Dublin. in 1805 he married Sophia Parnell, only daughter of Sir John Parnell former Chancellor of the Exchequer of Ireland. The Evans family were the principal landowners in the Portrane area, and in 1820, on the death of his father, George inherited the family estates. He was High Sheriff of County Dublin in 1829–1830.

At the 1832 general election, Evans was elected to the United Kingdom House of Commons as Member of Parliament for County Dublin. He described himself as an independent, although he took the Whig whip. In June 1834 he was involved in an angry public confrontation with Daniel O'Connell, leader of the Repeal Association. O'Connell dismissed Evans as both a landlord and a Whig. Evans replied that "I belong to no party, I have no object in view but the happiness and prosperity of Ireland." He was highly critical of what he saw as O'Connell's autocratic leadership style and assumption that he represented all shades of Irish opinion. He argued that O'Connell was trying to silence the "men of property and education" adding that he would sooner "be doomed to perpetual exile than submit to such a tyranny". By November 1834 the two parliamentarians had patched up their differences, jointly forming an Anti-Tory Association in Dublin. He was appointed to the Privy Council of Ireland by Lord Fortescue, the Lord Lieutenant.

Evans held his seat at the general elections of 1835 and 1837, but was unseated in 1841. He died suddenly at his residence, Portrane House, from what was described as "an attack of flying gout to the heart". In 1844 his widow built a replica of an Irish round tower in his memory, which now stands in the grounds of St Ita's Hospital, Portrane.

Parliament of the United Kingdom
Preceded by Henry White; William Brabazon	Member of Parliament for County Dublin; 1832 – 1841; With: Christopher Fitzsimon (1832–1837); William Brabazon (1837–1841)	Succeeded by Thomas Edward Taylor; James Hans Hamilton
