= 1917 South Dublin by-election =

UK Parliamentary by-election

The 1917 South Dublin by-election was held on 6 July 1917. The by-election was held due to the death of the incumbent Irish Parliamentary MP, William Francis Cotton. It was won by the Irish Parliamentary candidate Michael Louis Hearn, who was unopposed.
