= Frank Lawless =

Irish politician (1870–1922)

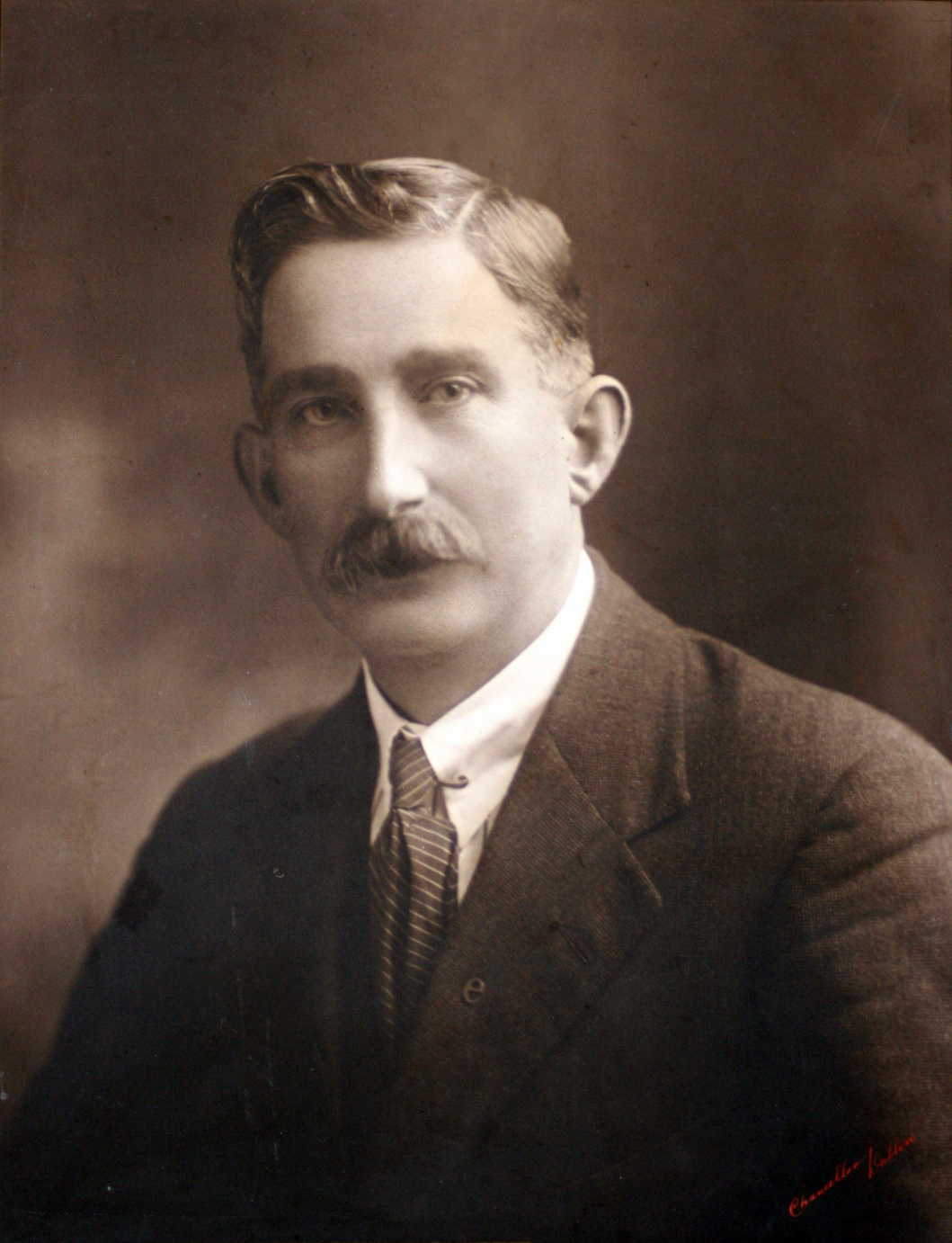

Teachta Dála
- In office May 1921 – 16 April 1922
- Constituency: Dublin County
- In office December 1918 – May 1921
- Constituency: Dublin North

Personal details
- Born: 10 October 1870 Saucerstown, Dublin, Ireland
- Died: 16 April 1922 (aged 51) Dublin, Ireland
- Party: Sinn Féin
- Children: 11

Military service
- Branch/service: Irish Republican Army
- Battles/wars: Easter Rising; Irish War of Independence

Frank J. Lawless (10 October 1870 – 16 April 1922) was an Irish revolutionary and politician who served as a Sinn Féin Teachta Dála (TD) for Dublin North from 1919 to 1922. He was a farmer at Saucerstown, Swords, County Dublin, and a member of a widely connected North Dublin family identified with the National movement. He was an early member of Sinn Féin and of the Gaelic League.

Frank Lawless took part in the 1916 Easter Rising, being second-in-command under Thomas Ashe in the fight at Ashbourne, County Meath. Two of his sons were also combatants on that occasion. As a result, he was condemned to death, but the sentence was commuted to ten years' penal servitude. He was imprisoned at Lewes with Harry Boland. He was released in the general amnesty of 1917. He was again arrested in connection with the "German Plot" and was confined in Usk prison. He was paroled to permit him to take part in the 1918 election, was present at the declaration at Balbriggan but returned to Usk prison on the same day. After his release from Usk he was interned in Ballykinlar Camp. Ashe was Frank Lawless's commanding officer, when the latter served with 4th section, Cork no.1 brigade during the war of independence. Lawless took an active part in the battle of Ashbourne, being battalion quartermaster. A victory for the Irish volunteers, who defeated a superior number of RIC at the crossroads of Ballyannan on the Friday of Easter Week. Coming from the south in a reserve position from behind a hedgerow, his men were fired on by their own 1st section by mistake. But many of the police lay dead in the ditches, and other surrendered, thanks to timely planning and courageous leadership from Mulcahy and Ashe, respectively. It was a wider attempt to raise rebellion outside Dublin.

At the 1918 general election, he was elected as part of the Sinn Féin landslide, defeating the Nationalist J. J. Clancy, who had sat for the Dublin North seat since 1885, by 9,138 to 4,428. Like the other Sinn Féin members, Lawless did not take his seat at Westminster but took part in the revolutionary First Dáil. He was re-elected in 1921 to the Second Dáil for the new constituency of Dublin County. He was one of the majority of 64–57 who voted in favour of ratification of the Anglo-Irish Treaty in the critical debate of 7 January 1922.

He died three months later at the age of 51 from injuries received when the pony trap in which he was riding was accidentally upset. He was buried with full military honours at Killossery Cemetery, Rolestown. His funeral was supposedly one of the final times Michael Collins and Éamon de Valera would stand side by side. He was married with six sons and five daughters.

Parliament of the United Kingdom
Preceded by J. J. Clancy	Member of Parliament for Dublin North; 1918–1922	Constituency abolished
Oireachtas
New constituency	Teachta Dála for Dublin North; 1918–1921	Constituency abolished

Dáil	Election	Deputy (Party)	Deputy (Party)	Deputy (Party)	Deputy (Party)	Deputy (Party)	Deputy (Party)	Deputy (Party)	Deputy (Party)
2nd	1921	Michael Derham (SF)	George Gavan Duffy (SF)	Séamus Dwyer (SF)	Desmond FitzGerald (SF)	Frank Lawless (SF)	Margaret Pearse (SF)	6 seats 1921–1923	
3rd	1922	Michael Derham (PT-SF)	George Gavan Duffy (PT-SF)	Thomas Johnson (Lab)	Desmond FitzGerald (PT-SF)	Darrell Figgis (Ind)	John Rooney (FP)	6 seats 1921–1923	
4th	1923	Michael Derham (CnaG)	Bryan Cooper (Ind)	Thomas Johnson (Lab)	Desmond FitzGerald (CnaG)	Darrell Figgis (Ind)	John Good (Ind)	Kathleen Lynn (Rep)	Kevin O'Higgins (CnaG)
4th	1924 by-election	Batt O'Connor (CnaG)	Bryan Cooper (Ind)	Thomas Johnson (Lab)	Desmond FitzGerald (CnaG)	Darrell Figgis (Ind)	John Good (Ind)	Kathleen Lynn (Rep)	Kevin O'Higgins (CnaG)
4th	1926 by-election	Batt O'Connor (CnaG)	Bryan Cooper (Ind)	Thomas Johnson (Lab)	Desmond FitzGerald (CnaG)	William Norton (Lab)	John Good (Ind)	Kathleen Lynn (Rep)	Kevin O'Higgins (CnaG)
5th	1927 (Jun)	Batt O'Connor (CnaG)	Bryan Cooper (Ind)	Thomas Johnson (Lab)	Desmond FitzGerald (CnaG)	Patrick Belton (FF)	John Good (Ind)	Seán MacEntee (FF)	Kevin O'Higgins (CnaG)
5th	1927 by-election	Batt O'Connor (CnaG)	Bryan Cooper (Ind)	Thomas Johnson (Lab)	Desmond FitzGerald (CnaG)	Patrick Belton (FF)	John Good (Ind)	Seán MacEntee (FF)	Gearóid O'Sullivan (CnaG)
6th	1927 (Sep)	Batt O'Connor (CnaG)	Bryan Cooper (CnaG)	Joseph Murphy (Ind)	Desmond FitzGerald (CnaG)	Seán Brady (FF)	John Good (Ind)	Seán MacEntee (FF)	Gearóid O'Sullivan (CnaG)
6th	1930 by-election	Batt O'Connor (CnaG)	Thomas Finlay (CnaG)	Joseph Murphy (Ind)	Desmond FitzGerald (CnaG)	Seán Brady (FF)	John Good (Ind)	Seán MacEntee (FF)	Gearóid O'Sullivan (CnaG)
7th	1932	Batt O'Connor (CnaG)	Thomas Finlay (CnaG)	Patrick Curran (Lab)	Henry Dockrell (CnaG)	Seán Brady (FF)	John Good (Ind)	Seán MacEntee (FF)	Gearóid O'Sullivan (CnaG)
8th	1933	Batt O'Connor (CnaG)	John A. Costello (CnaG)	Margaret Mary Pearse (FF)	Henry Dockrell (CnaG)	Seán Brady (FF)	John Good (Ind)	Seán MacEntee (FF)	Gearóid O'Sullivan (CnaG)
8th	1935 by-election	Cecil Lavery (FG)	John A. Costello (CnaG)	Margaret Mary Pearse (FF)	Henry Dockrell (CnaG)	Seán Brady (FF)	John Good (Ind)	Seán MacEntee (FF)	Gearóid O'Sullivan (CnaG)
9th	1937	Cecil Lavery (FG)	Henry Dockrell (FG)	Gerrard McGowan (Lab)	Patrick Fogarty (FF)	Seán Brady (FF)	5 seats 1937–1948		
10th	1938	Patrick Belton (FG)	Henry Dockrell (FG)	Thomas Mullen (FF)	Patrick Fogarty (FF)	Seán Brady (FF)	5 seats 1937–1948		
11th	1943	Liam Cosgrave (FG)	Henry Dockrell (FG)	James Tunney (Lab)	Patrick Fogarty (FF)	Seán Brady (FF)	5 seats 1937–1948		
12th	1944	Liam Cosgrave (FG)	Henry Dockrell (FG)	Patrick Burke (FF)	Patrick Fogarty (FF)	Seán Brady (FF)	5 seats 1937–1948		
12th	1947 by-election	Liam Cosgrave (FG)	Henry Dockrell (FG)	Patrick Burke (FF)	Seán MacBride (CnaP)	Seán Brady (FF)	5 seats 1937–1948		
13th	1948	Éamon Rooney (FG)	Seán Dunne (Lab)	Patrick Burke (FF)	3 seats 1948–1961				
14th	1951	Éamon Rooney (FG)	Seán Dunne (Lab)	Patrick Burke (FF)	3 seats 1948–1961				
15th	1954	Éamon Rooney (FG)	Seán Dunne (Lab)	Patrick Burke (FF)	3 seats 1948–1961				
16th	1957	Éamon Rooney (FG)	Kevin Boland (FF)	Patrick Burke (FF)	3 seats 1948–1961				
17th	1961	Éamon Rooney (FG)	Kevin Boland (FF)	Patrick Burke (FF)	Mark Clinton (FG)	Seán Dunne (Ind)	5 seats 1961–1969		
18th	1965	Des Foley (FF)	Kevin Boland (FF)	Patrick Burke (FF)	Mark Clinton (FG)	Seán Dunne (Lab)	5 seats 1961–1969		
19th	1969	Constituency abolished. See Dublin County North and Dublin County South							
