= Hans Hamilton, 4th Baron HolmPatrick =

British politician (1955–2024)

The Right Honourable The Lord HolmPatrick

Member of the House of Lords
- Lord Temporal
- as a hereditary peer 15 February 1991 – 11 November 1999
- Preceded by: The 2nd Baron HolmPatrick
- Succeeded by: Seat abolished (Note: Under the House of Lords Act 1999.)

Personal details
- Born: Hans James David Hamilton; 15 March 1955
- Died: 21 March 2024 (aged 69)
- Party: Conservative

Hans James David Hamilton, 4th Baron HolmPatrick (15 March 1955 – 21 March 2024), was a British hereditary peer and Conservative politician.

== Background ==
Lord HolmPatrick was the son of the late James Hans Hamilton, 3rd Baron HolmPatrick (1928–1991), and Anne Loys Roche Brass. The 3rd Lord HolmPatrick was the son of Hans Hamilton, 2nd Baron HolmPatrick (1886–1942), and Lady Edina Conyngham (1888–1964), daughter of Henry Conyngham, 4th Marquess Conyngham (1857–1897). In turn, the 2nd Lord HolmPatrick was the son of Ion Trant Hamilton, 1st Baron HolmPatrick, and Lady Victoria Alexandria Wellesley. She was a daughter of the courtier Major-General Lord Charles Wellesley. Her paternal grandfather was Field Marshal The 1st Duke of Wellington, the famous Anglo-Irish military commander and later Prime Minister. She was also the elder sister of the 3rd and 4th Duke. She was granted the rank of a duke's daughter in 1884. The first Lord HolmPatrick was an MP and Irish civic leader.

The future Lord HolmPatrick married Gill Francesca Anne du Feu, the daughter of Squadron Leader Kenneth James (Toby) Harding, on 19 July 1984. Their son, James Hans Stephen Hamilton (born 6 October 1982), was ineligible to succeed his father in the barony, due to being born before his parents marriage. The barony therefore passed to Lord Holmpatrick's brother, Ion Henry James Hamilton, 5th Baron Holmpatrick.

Lord HolmPatrick died on 21 March 2024, at the age of 69.

== Political career ==
Lord HolmPatrick was a Conservative peer until 1999, when most of the hereditary peers were removed from the House of Lords by the House of Lords Act 1999. Lord HolmPatrick was not one of those 15 hereditary peers elected by the whole House nor one of those elected by the Conservative hereditary.

Coat of arms of Hans Hamilton, 4th Baron HolmPatrick
Crest A demi-antelope Argent armed and unguled Or charged with a mullet Gules holding between the hoofs a human heart as in the arms. Escutcheon Gules a mullet Argent between three cinquefoils pierced Ermine on a chief Or a heart of the first. Supporters Dexter an antelope Argent attired Or sinister a lion Gules each having pendant from a collar flory counter-flory Or a shield Ermine charged with a heart Gules. Motto Qualis Ab Incepto

== Sources ==
- Mosley, Charles, ed., Burke's Peerage, Baronetage and Knightage, 107th edition, London (2004) p. 1947.

Peerage of the United Kingdom
Preceded by James Hamilton	Baron HolmPatrick; 1991–2024; Member of the House of Lords (1991–1999)	Succeeded by Ion Hamilton
