= South Dublin (UK Parliament constituency) =

UK parliamentary constituency in Ireland, 1885–1922

- Former county constituency for the House of Commons

1885–1922
- Seats: 1
- Created from: County Dublin
- Replaced by: Dublin County

South Dublin, a division of County Dublin, was a county constituency in Ireland from 1885 to 1922. It elected one Member of Parliament (MP) to the House of Commons of the Parliament of the United Kingdom, using the first past the post voting system.

Prior to the 1885 general election the area was part of the County Dublin constituency. From 1918 to 1921, it was also used as a constituency for Dáil Éireann. From the dissolution of 1922, shortly before the establishment of the Irish Free State, the area was not represented in the UK Parliament.

== Boundaries ==
From 1801 to 1885, the county was the undivided two-member County Dublin constituency. Under the Redistribution of Seats Act 1885, the county was divided into two single-member divisions of North Dublin and South Dublin.

From 1885 to 1918, South Dublin was defined as:

The barony of Dublin,

that part of the barony of Rathdown (except so much as is comprised in the constituency of North Dublin),

and so much of the parishes of Donnybrook, St. Catherine's and St. Peter's, and the townland of Cherry Orchard, in the parish of St. Nicholas Without, as is comprised in the barony of Uppercross.

This constituency comprised the south-eastern part of County Dublin, as a strip along the coast south of the city of Dublin to the county boundary. It included Dalkey, Kingstown, Blackrock, Stillorgan, Glencullen.

A Boundary Commission in 1917 recommended an increase in the representation of County Dublin from two seats to four seats. Under the Redistribution of Seats (Ireland) Act 1918, the parliamentary representation of the administrative county was increased from two to four divisions. South Dublin was extended to the west, with the creation of two new divisions of Pembroke and Rathmines.

From 1918 to 1922, South Dublin was defined as:

the part of the rural district of Rathdown No. 1 which is not contained in the Pembroke Division and the urban districts of Blackrock, Dalkey, Killiney and Ballybrack, and Kingstown.

Under the Government of Ireland Act 1920, the area was combined with the North Dublin, Pembroke and Rathmines Divisions to form Dublin County, a 6-seat constituency for the Southern Ireland House of Commons and a two-seat constituency at Westminster. Sinn Féin treated the 1921 election for the Southern Ireland House of Commons as part of the election to the Second Dáil. The six seats were won uncontested by Sinn Féin. Gavan Duffy was one of the six TDs for Dublin County.

Under s. 1(4) of the Irish Free State (Agreement) Act 1922, no writ was to be issued "for a constituency in Ireland other than a constituency in Northern Ireland". Therefore, no vote was held in County Dublin at the 1922 United Kingdom general election on 15 November 1922, shortly before the Irish Free State left the United Kingdom on 6 December 1922.

== Politics ==
At the general elections of 1885 and 1886, the Irish Parliamentary Party candidate gained a majority of the votes cast. At the general elections of 1892, 1895, 1900, 1906 and January 1910, Unionist candidates gained a majority of the votes cast, although in 1900 the Unionist vote was split and the Irish Parliamentary Party candidate was elected. In January 1910, the Unionist majority fell to 66, and in December 1910, the Irish Parliamentary Party candidate was returned with a majority of 133. "The unionists had held on to the ... seat with the help of loyal upper and middle-class Catholics. When the seat eventually fell to the nationalists in the second election of 1910 the successful candidate was William Cotton, a leading figure in the business community whose patriotism was broad enough to allow him to support motions for loyal addresses to the monarch at Dublin Corporation meetings ... many nationalists were suspicious of Cotton's conservative views" At a by-election in July 1917, the Irish Parliamentary Party candidate was returned unopposed. Following a redrawing of boundaries, the seat was won by the Sinn Féin candidate at the 1918 general election.

At the 1918 general election, Sinn Féin issued an election manifesto in which it called for a "establishment of a constituent assembly comprising persons chosen by Irish constituencies". After the election, Sinn Féin invited all those elected for Irish constituencies to sit as members of Dáil Éireann, termed Teachta Dála (or TD, known in English as a Deputy). In practice, only those elected for Sinn Féin attended. This included George Gavan Duffy, elected for South Dublin.

== Members of Parliament ==
Election	Member	Party
1885	Sir Thomas Henry Grattan Esmonde	Irish Parliamentary
1891	Sir Thomas Henry Grattan Esmonde	Irish National Federation (Anti-Parnellite)
1892	Horace Plunkett	Irish Unionist
1900	John Mooney	Irish Parliamentary
1906	Walter Hume Long	Irish Unionist
Jan. 1910	Bryan Cooper	Irish Unionist
Dec. 1910	William Francis Cotton	Irish Parliamentary
1917 by-election	Michael Louis Hearn	Irish Parliamentary
1918	George Gavan Duffy	Sinn Féin
1922	constituency abolished	

== Elections ==
=== Elections in the 1910s ===
1918 general election: South Dublin
Party	Candidate	Votes	%	±%
Sinn Féin	George Gavan Duffy	5,133	38.56	New
Irish Unionist	Sir Thomas Robinson	4,354	32.72	▼16.64
Irish Parliamentary	Thomas Clarke	3,819	28.70	▼21.94
Majority		779	5.84	N/A
Turnout		13,306	74.63	
Sinn Féin gain from Irish Parliamentary		Swing		

- Death of Cotton

By-Election 6 July 1917: South Dublin
Party	Candidate	Votes	%	±%
Irish Parliamentary	Michael Louis Hearn	Unopposed	N/A	N/A
Irish Parliamentary hold				

December 1910 general election: South Dublin
Party	Candidate	Votes	%	±%
Irish Parliamentary	William Francis Cotton	5,223	50.64	▲0.97
Irish Unionist	Bryan Cooper	5,090	49.36	▼0.97
Majority		133	1.28	N/A
Turnout		10,313		
Irish Parliamentary gain from Irish Unionist		Swing	▲0.64	

January 1910 general election: South Dublin
Party	Candidate	Votes	%	±%
Irish Unionist	Bryan Cooper	5,072	50.33	▼6.97
Irish Parliamentary	William Francis Cotton	5,006	49.67	▲6.97
Majority		66	0.66	▼14.60
Turnout		10,078		
Irish Unionist hold		Swing	▼6.97	

=== Elections in the 1900s ===
1906 general election: South Dublin
Party	Candidate	Votes	%	±%
Irish Unionist	Walter H. Long	5,269	57.30	▲20.30
Irish Parliamentary	Richard Hazleton	3,926	42.70	▼0.71
Majority		1,343	14.60	N/A
Turnout		9,195	87.16	▲14.17
Registered electors		10,549		
Irish Unionist gain from Irish Parliamentary		Swing	▲20.30	

1900 general election: South Dublin
Party	Candidate	Votes	%	±%
Irish Parliamentary	John Mooney	3,410	43.41	▲5.74
Irish Unionist	Horace Plunkett	2,906	37.00	▼25.33
Ind. Unionist	F. Elrington Ball	1,539	19.59	New
Majority		504	6.42	N/A
Turnout		7,855	72.99	▲1.18
Registered electors		10,762		
Irish Parliamentary gain from Irish Unionist		Swing	▲5.74 (Note: Comparison with vote gained by Parnellite Nationalist in previous election.)	

=== Elections in the 1890s ===
1895 general election: South Dublin
Party	Candidate	Votes	%	±%
Irish Unionist	Horace Plunkett	4,901	62.33	▲8.26
Parnellite Nationalist	Edmund Haviland-Burke	2,962	37.67	▲9.70
Majority		1,939	24.66	▼1.44
Turnout		7,863	71.81	▼6.01
Registered electors		10,949		
Irish Unionist hold		Swing	▲8.26	

1892 general election: South Dublin
Party	Candidate	Votes	%	±%
Irish Unionist	Horace Plunkett	4,371	54.07	▲14.76
Parnellite Nationalist	Dr St. Lawrence Ffrench-Mullen	2,261	27.97	New
Irish National Federation	Sir Thomas Henry Grattan Esmonde	1,452	17.96	▼42.73
Majority		2,110	26.10	N/A
Turnout		8,084	77.82	▲4.68
Registered electors		10,388		
Irish Unionist gain from Irish Parliamentary		Swing	▲13.99	

=== Elections in the 1880s ===
1886 general election: South Dublin (Population 72,636)
Party	Candidate	Votes	%	±%
Irish Parliamentary	Sir Thomas Henry Grattan Esmonde	5,022	60.69	▲2.90
Liberal Unionist	Joseph Todhunter Pim	3,254	39.31	▼2.90
Majority		1,768	21.36	▲5.78
Turnout		8,276	73.14	▼5.07
Registered electors		11,314		
Irish Parliamentary hold		Swing	▲2.90	

1885 general election: South Dublin
Party	Candidate	Votes	%	±%
Irish Parliamentary	Sir Thomas Henry Grattan Esmonde	5,114	57.79	
Irish Conservative	Ion T. Hamilton	3,736	42.21	
Majority		1,378	15.58	
Turnout		8,850	78.21	
Registered electors		11,314		
Irish Parliamentary win (new seat)				
