= Michael Louis Hearn =

Member of Parliament for South Dublin
- In office 6 July 1917 – 1918
- Preceded by: William Francis Cotton
- Succeeded by: George Gavan Duffy

Personal details
- Born: 1866
- Died: May 1, 1931 (aged 64–65)
- Occupation: Solicitor
- Known for: Irish Nationalist politician

Michael Louis Hearn (1866 – 1 May 1931) was an Irish Nationalist Member of the Parliament of the United Kingdom for South Dublin, 1917–18.

He was the son of T. Hearn of Dublin and was educated at Tullabeg College and Ratcliffe College, Leicestershire, England. He was admitted as a solicitor in 1889, and built up an extensive practice, becoming President of the Incorporated Law Society. He was active in the Nationalist movement from early manhood, working on organization and electoral registration in South Dublin. He represented Rathmines for some years on Dublin County Council, of which he was chairman. He was also for some years chairman of the board of directors of the Nationalist newspaper, the Freeman's Journal.

Hearn was elected unopposed for South Dublin in a by-election on 6 July 1917, following the death of William Cotton. He did not stand at the general election the following year.

== Notes ==
Parliament of the United Kingdom
Preceded by William Francis Cotton	Member of Parliament for South Dublin; 1917 – 1918	Succeeded by George Gavan Duffy
