= William Francis Cotton =

Irish politician (1847–1917)

Member of Parliament for South Dublin
- In office 1910–1917

Personal details
- Born: 1847
- Died: 8 June 1917 (aged 69–70)
- Party: Irish Nationalist

William Francis Cotton (1847 – 8 June 1917) was an Irish Nationalist politician. He sat for South Dublin in the United Kingdom House of Commons.

He was chairman of the Alliance and Dublin Gas Consumers Co. and A. Findlater and Company, as well as a director of the Dublin United Tramways Company and others. He was an alderman of Dublin Corporation and Sheriff of Dublin in 1901.

He won the seat at the December 1910 general election, narrowly defeating the Unionist incumbent, and held it until his death.

Parliament of the United Kingdom
Preceded by Bryan Cooper	Member of Parliament for South Dublin; December 1910 – 1917	Succeeded by Michael Louis Hearn
