= Richard Talbot, 2nd Baron Talbot of Malahide =

Irish Baron

The Right Honourable The Lord Talbot of Malahide PC
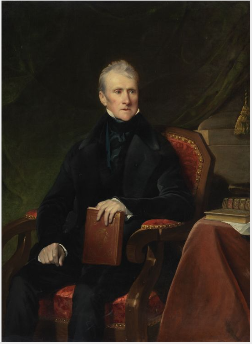

Member of Parliament for County Dublin
- In office 1807–1830
- Preceded by: Sir Frederick Falkiner
- Succeeded by: Lord Brabazon

Member of Parliament for County Dublin
- In office May 1790 – 1791
- Preceded by: John Finlay
- Succeeded by: John Finlay

Personal details
- Born: 1766
- Died: 29 October 1849 (aged 83)
- Party: Whig

Military service
- Allegiance: (Kingdom of Great Britain) Great Britain
- Branch/service: British Army
- Years of service: 1793–1795
- Rank: Colonel
- Commands: 118th Regiment of Foot
- Battles/wars: French Revolutionary Wars

Richard Wogan Talbot, 2nd Baron Talbot of Malahide, PC (1766 – 29 October 1849) was an Anglo-Irish politician.

Talbot was the son of Richard Talbot, of Malahide Castle, and Margaret Talbot, 1st Baroness Talbot of Malahide, daughter of James O'Reilly and sister of Sir Hugh O'Reilly (later Nugent), 1st Baronet, and Andreas O'Reilly. Thomas Talbot and Sir John Talbot were his younger brothers.

He was elected as the MP for County Dublin in the Parliament of Ireland in May 1790, sitting until March 1791 when it was ruled that he had not been duly elected.

He was returned to the Parliament of the United Kingdom as one of two representatives for County Dublin in 1807, a seat he held until 1830. In 1834 he succeeded his mother in the barony. This was an Irish peerage and did not entitle him to an automatic seat in the House of Lords. In 1836 he was sworn of the Irish Privy Council. Three years later he was raised to the Peerage of the United Kingdom as Baron Furnival, of Malahide in the County of Dublin, which gave him a seat in the House of Lords.

Lord Talbot of Malahide died in October 1849. He had no surviving male issue and the barony of Furnival died with him. He was succeeded in the Irish barony by his younger brother, James.

Parliament of the United Kingdom
Preceded by Hans Hamilton; Sir Frederick Falkiner, Bt	Member of Parliament for County Dublin; 1807–1830; With: Hans Hamilton 1807–1823; Henry White 1823–1830	Succeeded by Henry White; Lord Brabazon
Peerage of Ireland
Preceded by Margaret Talbot	Baron Talbot of Malahide; 1834–1849	Succeeded by James Talbot
Peerage of the United Kingdom
New creation	Baron Furnival; 1839–1849	Extinct
