= Christopher Fitzsimon =

Irish barrister and politician

Christopher Fitzsimon (died 25 July 1856) was an Irish barrister and politician. From Glencullen (at the time spelt 'Glancullen'), Fitzsimon married Ellen O'Connell, eldest daughter of Daniel O'Connell. By March 1829 he was the only Catholic on the grand jury of Wicklow.

As a member of the Repeal Association, he was one of two MPs elected for County Dublin in the 1833 Election. In August 1841 Fitzsimon's seat, Glencullen hosted the "cabinet council", the centre of the agitation movement against Robert Peel's government. Attendees included Viscount Morpeth and Frederick Romilly.

In later life Fitzsimon held the lucrative office of Clerk of the Crown and Hanaper.

Parliament of the United Kingdom
Preceded by Henry White; Lord Brabazon	Member of Parliament for County Dublin; 1832 – 1837; With: George Hampden Evans	Succeeded by John Bent; George Hampden Evans
