= William Brabazon, 11th Earl of Meath =

Irish peer and politician (1803–1887)

William Brabazon, 11th Earl of Meath (1803 – 26 May 1887) was an Irish Peer and MP.

He was the eldest surviving son of John Chambre Brabazon, 10th Earl of Meath and Lady Melosina Adelaide Meade, daughter of John Meade, 1st Earl of Clanwilliam and Theodosia Hawkins-Magill He was educated at Eton College and Christ Church, Oxford. He was known as Lord Brabazon between 1826 and 1851, after which he succeeded his father as the 11th Earl of Meath and the 2nd Baronet Chaworth.

He was elected MP for County Dublin in 1830–1832 and 1837–1841 and appointed a Privy Councillor in 1839.

He was appointed High Sheriff of County Dublin for 1835–36 and High Sheriff of Wicklow for 1848–49 and Lord Lieutenant and custos rotulorum of County Wicklow from 1869 until his death in 1887. He was Colonel of the County Dublin militia from 1847 to 1881 and Hon. Colonel of the 5th battalion, Royal Dublin Fusiliers. He was an aide-de-camp to Queen Victoria.

He married in 1837 Harriot, the daughter of Sir Richard Brooke, 6th Baronet, of Norton Priory, Cheshire and Harriot Cuniffe, with whom he had two sons, Jacques, who died young, and Reginald, and a daughter Kathleen, who died unmarried. The family lived at Kilruddery House, in Bray, County Wicklow, which is still the seat of the Earls of Meath. On his death in 1887, he was succeeded by his surviving son Reginald Brabazon, 12th Earl of Meath, a career diplomat.

William Gladstone, Liberal leader in the British House of Commons, spent three weeks in Kilruddery House, as the guest of William Brabazon, 11th Earl of Meath.

Parliament of the United Kingdom
Preceded by Richard Talbot; Henry White	Member of Parliament for County Dublin; 1832–1835; With: Henry White	Succeeded by Christopher Fitzsimon; Christopher Fitzsimon
Preceded by Christopher Fitzsimon; George Hampden Evans	Member of Parliament for County Dublin; 1837–1841; With: George Hampden Evans	Succeeded by James Hans Hamilton; Thomas Edward Taylor
Peerage of Ireland
Preceded by John Brabazon	Earl of Meath; 1851–1887	Succeeded by Reginald Brabazon
