= Fletcher baronets of Carrow (1812) =

Extinct baronetcy in Ireland

Escutcheon of the Fletcher baronets of Carrow

The Fletcher baronetcy, of Carrow (Carhoo Upper townland) in the County of Cork, was a title in the Baronetage of the United Kingdom. It was created on 14 December 1812 for Richard Fletcher of the Royal Engineers. He died in August 1813 at the Siege of San Sebastián. The baronetcy was extinct on the death of the 2nd Baronet in 1876.

== Fletcher baronets of Carrow (1812) ==
- Sir Richard Fletcher, 1st Baronet (1768–1813)
- Sir Richard John Fletcher, 2nd Baronet (1805–1876)

== Notes ==
Baronetage of the United Kingdom
Preceded by Close baronets	Fletcher baronets of Carrow; 14 December 1812	Succeeded by Falkiner baronets
