= George Gavan Duffy =

Irish politician, barrister and judge

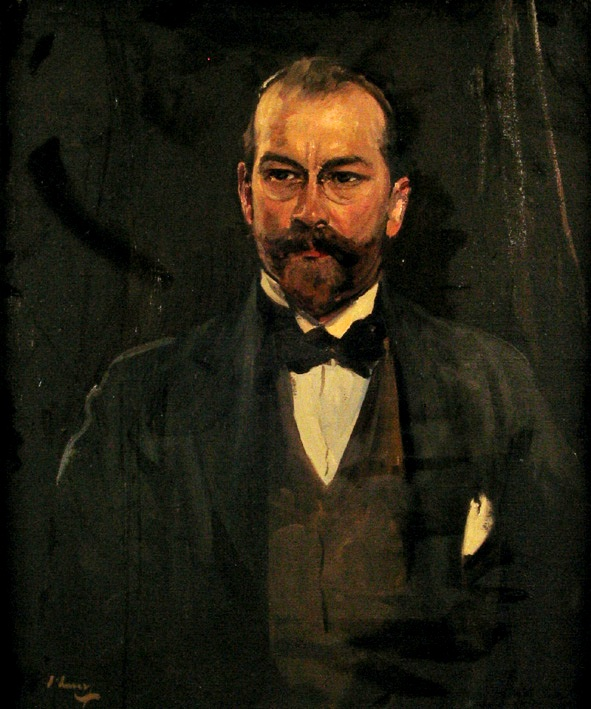
- Portrait of Gavan Duffy by Sir John Lavery

President of the High Court
- In office 4 May 1946 – 20 June 1951
- Nominated by: Government of Ireland
- Appointed by: Seán T. O'Kelly
- Preceded by: Conor Maguire
- Succeeded by: Cahir Davitt

Judge of the High Court
- In office 2 July 1936 – 20 June 1951
- Nominated by: Government of Ireland
- Appointed by: Domhnall Ua Buachalla

Minister for Foreign Affairs
- In office 10 January 1922 – 25 July 1922
- President: Michael Collins
- Preceded by: Arthur Griffith
- Succeeded by: Arthur Griffith

Teachta Dála
- In office May 1921 – August 1923
- Constituency: Dublin County

Member of Parliament
- In office December 1918 – May 1921
- Preceded by: Michael Louis Hearn
- Succeeded by: Constituency abolished
- Constituency: Dublin South

Personal details
- Born: 21 October 1882 Rock Ferry, Cheshire, England
- Died: 10 June 1951 (aged 68) Dublin, Ireland
- Party: Sinn Féin
- Spouse: Margaret Sullivan (m. 1908)
- Children: 2
- Parent: Charles Gavan Duffy (father)
- Relatives: Frank Gavan Duffy (half-brother); Louise Gavan Duffy (sister)
- Education: University of London

George Gavan Duffy (21 October 1882 – 10 June 1951) was an Irish politician, barrister and judge who served as president of the High Court from 1946 to 1951, a judge of the High Court from 1936 to 1951 and Minister for Foreign Affairs from January 1922 to July 1922. He served as a Teachta Dála (TD) from 1918 to 1923.

== Family ==
George Gavan Duffy was born at Rose Cottage, Rock Ferry, Cheshire, England, in 1882, the son of Charles Gavan Duffy and his third wife, Louise (née Hall). His half-brother Sir Frank Gavan Duffy (1852–1936) was the fourth Chief Justice of the High Court of Australia, sitting on the bench of the High Court from 1913 to 1935.

His sister Louise Gavan Duffy came to Ireland in 1907, taught in Patrick Pearse's St Ita's school for girls (Scoil Íde), was along with Mary Colum first Secretary of Cumann na mBan, and was out in the Easter Rising of 1916 in the GPO and Jacob's garrisons. She founded and ran Scoil Bhríde, a bilingual school in Dublin, which is still in operation. Louise came originally to Dublin, as her mother died in 1889. George was raised by three half-sisters travelling from Austria and Germany, at Guilloy, Nice, France. He spoke fluent Italian and French received education from Petit Seminaire. From there he was sent to Stonyhurst College.

He qualified with a solicitor's firm in London in 1907. He married Margaret Sullivan on 13 December 1908. They had two children, a son (Colum) and a daughter (Máire). Colum Duffy was a legal scholar and law librarian at the Law Society of Ireland.

== Early career ==
Gavan Duffy qualified as a solicitor and practised in London. He defended Sir Roger Casement at his trial for high treason after the Easter Rising. Although the case was unsuccessful and Casement executed, the trial had an enormous effect on Gavan Duffy. After sentence was passed on Casement, Duffy said: "Ireland has seen her sons aye, and her daughters too suffer from generation to generation always for the same cause, meeting always the same fate, and always at the hands of the same power; and always a fresh generation has passed on to withstand the same oppression." In 1917, when he was called to the Irish Bar, he came to live in King's Inns, Dublin, where he became immersed in Irish political life.

== Political life ==
=== Recognition efforts ===
At the 1918 general election, he was elected as a Sinn Féin MP for South Dublin. In common with all Sinn Féin representatives, he did not take his seat at Westminster, but sat as a member of Dáil Éireann.

He was sent to Paris to join Seán T. O'Kelly as an envoy of the newly declared Irish Republic. Gavan Duffy published articles and pamphlets urging recognition of Ireland as a sovereign nation at the Paris Peace Conference, which caused increasing embarrassment to the French establishment, who believed his publications were damaging Anglo-French relations.

Gavan Duffy and O'Kelly sought France's help against Britain when the treaties ending the First World War had not yet been signed; Britain had been France's main ally for most of the war, in which France had suffered enormous losses. In January 1919, the Irish Republican Army had also started the Irish War of Independence against Britain, and the new Dáil had declared independence from the United Kingdom.

Further, the British position was that it was preparing a revised system of Irish Home Rule which would be effected after the Peace Conference, and that it had tried to solve the Irish Question at the Irish Convention in 1917, which Sinn Féin had boycotted. Sinn Féin had joined in the campaign against conscription in 1918.

In consequence, all the Allies of World War I saw the Sinn Féin movement as more or less hostile. A final letter of June 1919 demanding recognition and addressed to the French Prime Minister Georges Clemenceau, the chairman of the Peace Conference, was not replied to.

Finally, after publishing a letter he had sent to Clemenceau in protest against the former mistreatment of Terence MacSwiney in prison in 1917, Gavan Duffy was banished from Paris. He was declared persona non grata in December 1920. He then went to Rome and from there travelled through Europe on behalf of the Ministry of the Irish Republic, without securing its recognition.

=== Anglo-Irish Treaty ===
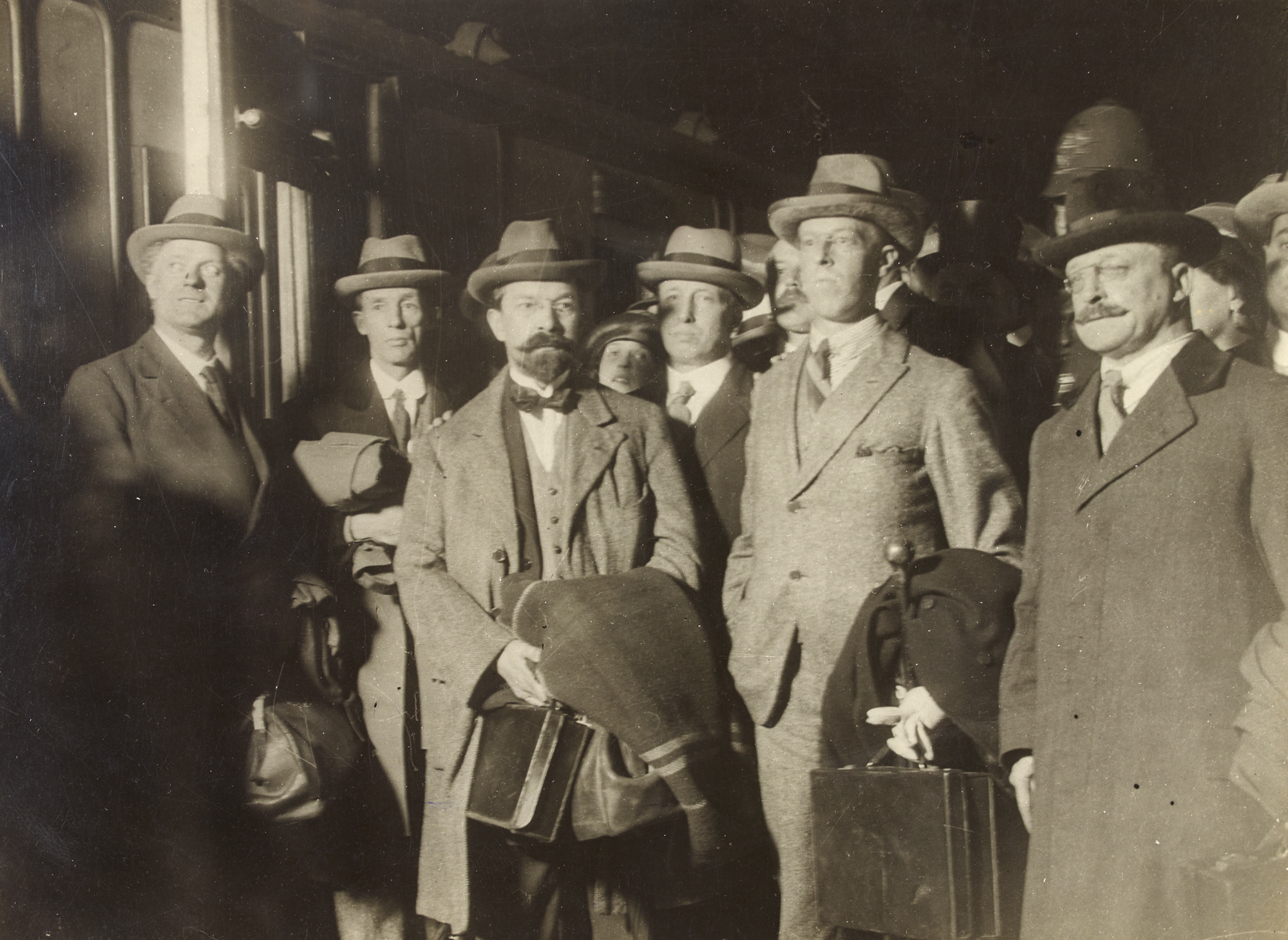
Gavan Duffy together with other members of the negotiation team (including Childers, Griffith, and Barton) in December 1921

Gavan Duffy was elected in an uncontested 1921 Southern Ireland House of Commons election for Dublin County.

When Éamon de Valera chose his plenipotentiaries to negotiate the Anglo-Irish Treaty in 1921, Gavan Duffy was chosen due mainly to his legal expertise. During negotiations with the British, Duffy unsuccessfully argued against the inclusion of the nationalist majority Counties of Tyrone and Fermanagh into Northern Ireland:

Tyrone and Fermanagh are going to be difficult for Northern Ireland. There is an Irish problem of Ulster which we ought to be able to settle. The English problem of Ulster which is up to you to proclaim [is] that the setting up of this present area cannot be justified, and that the principal of no coercion of Ulster should be applied to Tyrone and Fermanagh.

He protested against signing the Treaty but did so reluctantly, becoming the last person to sign. Duffy spoke of the pressure placed on the Irish delegation to sign the treaty: "...the alternative to our signing that particular Treaty was immediate war...we had to make the choice within three hours and to make it without reference to our Cabinet, to our Parliament or to our people...We lost the Republic in order to save the people of Ireland." During the debates which followed in Dáil Éireann, Gavan Duffy stated that he would recommend the Treaty reluctantly but sincerely as he saw no alternative for the desired aim of independence. Gavan Duffy placed the onus on the people who were responsible for drafting the Constitution of the Irish Free State to frame it in accordance with the terms of the Treaty. He disagreed, however, with Griffith's decision to show the draft constitution to British Prime Minister Lloyd George, who immediately ordered that references to the King had to be inserted as well as an Oath of Allegiance. Lloyd George threatened to start a war if the Irish refused to sign, but Gavan Duffy did not believe it.

On 21 December 1921, during the Dáil debate on the Treaty, he explained his vote:

I do not love this Treaty now any more than I loved it when I signed it, but I do not think ... that it is an adequate motive for rejection to point out that some of us signed the Treaty under duress, nor to say that this Treaty will not lead to permanent peace. It is necessary before you reject the Treaty to go further than that and to produce to the people of Ireland a rational alternative. My heart is with those who are against the Treaty, but my reason is against them, because I can see no rational alternative.

...

You may gamble on the prospects of a renewal of that horrible war, which I for one have only seen from afar, but which I know those who have so nobly withstood do not wish to see begun again without a clear prospect of getting further than they are to-day. We are told that this is a surrender of principle. If that be so, we must be asked to believe that every one of those who have gone before us in previous fights, and who in the end have had to lay down their arms or surrender to avert a greater evil to the people, have likewise been guilty of a breach of principle. I do not think an argument of that kind will get you much further. No! The solid principle, the solid basis upon which every honest man ought to make up his mind on this issue, may be summed up in the principle that we all claimed when it was first enunciated by the President, the principle of government by the consent of the governed. I say that no serious person here, whatever his feelings, knowing as he must what the people of this country think of the matter, will be doing his duty if, under these circumstances, he refuses to ratify the Treaty. Ratify it with the most dignified protest you can, ratify because you cannot do otherwise, but ratify it in the interests of the people you must.

=== Resignations ===
This prompted him to resign but he was compelled to remain in office, serving as Minister for Foreign Affairs from January 1922 to July 1922. He was elected at the 1922 general election for Pro-Treaty Sinn Féin. On the outbreak of the Irish Civil War he resigned when the Provisional Government refused to effect a court order for habeas corpus in favour of George Oliver Plunkett, who was detained without charge with other republicans.

His tenure in office was cut short by his decision to resign again when the Executive Council of the Irish Free State abolished the Dáil Courts and executed his good friend Erskine Childers.

He contested the 1923 general election as an independent candidate but failed to be re-elected.

== Barrister and judge ==
Gavan Duffy returned to the Irish Bar and built up a large practice and was engaged in some notable constitutional cases such as the Land Annuities controversy in which he claimed that the Irish Free State could not be bound either in honour or in law to hand over annuities to Britain. He was appointed senior counsel in 1930 and a judge of the High Court in 1936. He acted as an unofficial legal advisor to Éamon de Valera during the drafting of the 1937 Constitution of Ireland and was consulted on many issues pertaining to it. He was also a member of the commission to set up the second house of the Oireachtas, Seanad Éireann, in 1937. As president of the High Court, he issued the judgment in State (Burke) v Lennon that was upheld by the Supreme Court. In the same year, he also became the first Irish judge to not wear the traditional black cap when passing a sentence of death.

In 1946, at the height of his legal career, he was appointed President of the High Court, a position he held for the rest of his life. He heard the controversial Tilson Case in 1950, one year before his death. His judgment applied the ne temere decree to the letter, as de Valera's 1937 Irish Constitution gave the Roman Catholic Church in Ireland a "special position". The Supreme Court concurred but Gavan Duffy was criticised in some quarters for his ruling.

At the time of his death, Gavan Duffy was writing a judgment in favour of Ernie O'Malley in a property case brought before the court of equity by O'Malley's estranged wife Helen Hooker. Although Gavan Duffy died before he could deliver judgment, Hooker decided not to pursue the case further.

He was a longstanding member of the Catholic organisation An Ríoghacht.

== Death ==
George Gavan Duffy died in a nursing home in Leeson Street, Dublin, on 10 June 1951.

Parliament of the United Kingdom
Preceded by Michael Louis Hearn	Member of Parliament for South Dublin; 1918–1922	Constituency abolished
Oireachtas
New constituency	Teachta Dála for Dublin South; 1918–1921	Constituency abolished
Political offices
Preceded by Arthur Griffith	Minister for Foreign Affairs; Jan 1922 – Jul 1922	Succeeded by Arthur Griffith

Dáil	Election	Deputy (Party)	Deputy (Party)	Deputy (Party)	Deputy (Party)	Deputy (Party)	Deputy (Party)	Deputy (Party)	Deputy (Party)
2nd	1921	Michael Derham (SF)	George Gavan Duffy (SF)	Séamus Dwyer (SF)	Desmond FitzGerald (SF)	Frank Lawless (SF)	Margaret Pearse (SF)	6 seats 1921–1923	
3rd	1922	Michael Derham (PT-SF)	George Gavan Duffy (PT-SF)	Thomas Johnson (Lab)	Desmond FitzGerald (PT-SF)	Darrell Figgis (Ind)	John Rooney (FP)	6 seats 1921–1923	
4th	1923	Michael Derham (CnaG)	Bryan Cooper (Ind)	Thomas Johnson (Lab)	Desmond FitzGerald (CnaG)	Darrell Figgis (Ind)	John Good (Ind)	Kathleen Lynn (Rep)	Kevin O'Higgins (CnaG)
4th	1924 by-election	Batt O'Connor (CnaG)	Bryan Cooper (Ind)	Thomas Johnson (Lab)	Desmond FitzGerald (CnaG)	Darrell Figgis (Ind)	John Good (Ind)	Kathleen Lynn (Rep)	Kevin O'Higgins (CnaG)
4th	1926 by-election	Batt O'Connor (CnaG)	Bryan Cooper (Ind)	Thomas Johnson (Lab)	Desmond FitzGerald (CnaG)	William Norton (Lab)	John Good (Ind)	Kathleen Lynn (Rep)	Kevin O'Higgins (CnaG)
5th	1927 (Jun)	Batt O'Connor (CnaG)	Bryan Cooper (Ind)	Thomas Johnson (Lab)	Desmond FitzGerald (CnaG)	Patrick Belton (FF)	John Good (Ind)	Seán MacEntee (FF)	Kevin O'Higgins (CnaG)
5th	1927 by-election	Batt O'Connor (CnaG)	Bryan Cooper (Ind)	Thomas Johnson (Lab)	Desmond FitzGerald (CnaG)	Patrick Belton (FF)	John Good (Ind)	Seán MacEntee (FF)	Gearóid O'Sullivan (CnaG)
6th	1927 (Sep)	Batt O'Connor (CnaG)	Bryan Cooper (CnaG)	Joseph Murphy (Ind)	Desmond FitzGerald (CnaG)	Seán Brady (FF)	John Good (Ind)	Seán MacEntee (FF)	Gearóid O'Sullivan (CnaG)
6th	1930 by-election	Batt O'Connor (CnaG)	Thomas Finlay (CnaG)	Joseph Murphy (Ind)	Desmond FitzGerald (CnaG)	Seán Brady (FF)	John Good (Ind)	Seán MacEntee (FF)	Gearóid O'Sullivan (CnaG)
7th	1932	Batt O'Connor (CnaG)	Thomas Finlay (CnaG)	Patrick Curran (Lab)	Henry Dockrell (CnaG)	Seán Brady (FF)	John Good (Ind)	Seán MacEntee (FF)	Gearóid O'Sullivan (CnaG)
8th	1933	Batt O'Connor (CnaG)	John A. Costello (CnaG)	Margaret Mary Pearse (FF)	Henry Dockrell (CnaG)	Seán Brady (FF)	John Good (Ind)	Seán MacEntee (FF)	Gearóid O'Sullivan (CnaG)
8th	1935 by-election	Cecil Lavery (FG)	John A. Costello (CnaG)	Margaret Mary Pearse (FF)	Henry Dockrell (CnaG)	Seán Brady (FF)	John Good (Ind)	Seán MacEntee (FF)	Gearóid O'Sullivan (CnaG)
9th	1937	Cecil Lavery (FG)	Henry Dockrell (FG)	Gerrard McGowan (Lab)	Patrick Fogarty (FF)	Seán Brady (FF)	5 seats 1937–1948		
10th	1938	Patrick Belton (FG)	Henry Dockrell (FG)	Thomas Mullen (FF)	Patrick Fogarty (FF)	Seán Brady (FF)	5 seats 1937–1948		
11th	1943	Liam Cosgrave (FG)	Henry Dockrell (FG)	James Tunney (Lab)	Patrick Fogarty (FF)	Seán Brady (FF)	5 seats 1937–1948		
12th	1944	Liam Cosgrave (FG)	Henry Dockrell (FG)	Patrick Burke (FF)	Patrick Fogarty (FF)	Seán Brady (FF)	5 seats 1937–1948		
12th	1947 by-election	Liam Cosgrave (FG)	Henry Dockrell (FG)	Patrick Burke (FF)	Seán MacBride (CnaP)	Seán Brady (FF)	5 seats 1937–1948		
13th	1948	Éamon Rooney (FG)	Seán Dunne (Lab)	Patrick Burke (FF)	3 seats 1948–1961				
14th	1951	Éamon Rooney (FG)	Seán Dunne (Lab)	Patrick Burke (FF)	3 seats 1948–1961				
15th	1954	Éamon Rooney (FG)	Seán Dunne (Lab)	Patrick Burke (FF)	3 seats 1948–1961				
16th	1957	Éamon Rooney (FG)	Kevin Boland (FF)	Patrick Burke (FF)	3 seats 1948–1961				
17th	1961	Éamon Rooney (FG)	Kevin Boland (FF)	Patrick Burke (FF)	Mark Clinton (FG)	Seán Dunne (Ind)	5 seats 1961–1969		
18th	1965	Des Foley (FF)	Kevin Boland (FF)	Patrick Burke (FF)	Mark Clinton (FG)	Seán Dunne (Lab)	5 seats 1961–1969		
19th	1969	Constituency abolished. See Dublin County North and Dublin County South							
