= Baron HolmPatrick =

Title in the Peerage of the United Kingdom

Baron HolmPatrick, of HolmPatrick in the County of Dublin, is a title in the Peerage of the United Kingdom. It was created in the 1897 Diamond Jubilee Honours for the Lord Lieutenant of County Dublin and former Member of Parliament for County Dublin, Ion Hamilton. Both his father, James Hans Hamilton, and grandfather, Hans Hamilton, had represented this constituency in the British Parliament.

From 1991 to 2024 the title is held by the first Baron's great-grandson, the fourth Baron, who succeeded his father. He was active on the Labour benches in the House of Lords prior to the House of Lords Act 1999 but the House of Lords website shows him as a Conservative.

The family seat was Abbotstown House, near Castleknock, County Dublin.

== Barons HolmPatrick (1897) ==
- Ion Trant Hamilton, 1st Baron HolmPatrick (1839–1898)
- Hans Wellesley Hamilton, 2nd Baron HolmPatrick DSO MC DL (1886–1942)
- James Hans Hamilton, 3rd Baron HolmPatrick (1928–1991)
- Hans James David Hamilton, 4th Baron HolmPatrick (1955–2024)
- Ion Henry James Hamilton, 5th Baron HolmPatrick (born 1956)

The heir presumptive is his nephew, Ross Andrew James Hamilton (born 1990).

Coat of arms of Baron HolmPatrick
Crest A demi-antelope Argent armed and unguled Or charged with a mullet Gules holding between the hoofs a human heart as in the arms. Escutcheon Gules a mullet Argent between three cinquefoils pierced Ermine on a chief Or a heart of the first. Supporters Dexter an antelope Argent attired Or sinister a lion Gules each having pendant from a collar flory counter-flory Or a shield Ermine charged with a heart Gules. Motto Qualis Ab Incepto
