= North Dublin (UK Parliament constituency) =

UK parliamentary constituency in Ireland, 1885–1922

- Former county constituency for the House of Commons

1885–1922
- Seats: 1
- Created from: County Dublin
- Replaced by: Dublin County

North Dublin (otherwise known as North County Dublin), a division of County Dublin, is a former parliamentary constituency which returned one Member of Parliament (MP) to the House of Commons of the United Kingdom from 1885 until 1922. From 1918 to 1921, it was also used as a constituency for Dáil Éireann. From the dissolution of 1922, the area was not represented in the UK Parliament.

== Boundaries ==
This constituency comprised the northern and western parts of County Dublin.

From 1885 to 1918, it was defined as:

The baronies of Balrothery East, Balrothery West, Castleknock, Coolock, Nethercross and Newcastle, that part of the barony of Rathdown contained within the parishes of Kilgobbin, Kiltiernan and Whitechurch, the townlands of Ballally, Ballinteer, Kingstown and Tiknock in the parish of Taney, and the townlands of Ballyroan, Butterfield, Old Orchard, Rathfarnham, Whitehall and Willbrook, and that part of the barony of Uppercross not contained within the constituency of South Dublin.

It was bounded by South Meath to the north-west, North Kildare to the south-west, West Wicklow and East Wicklow to the south, the city of Dublin, South Dublin and the sea to the east. It comprised the polling districts of Stepaside, Rathfarnham, Tallaght, Rathcoole, Blanchardstown, Lucan, Kilmainham, Drumcondra, Coolock, Howth, Swords, Naul, Balbriggan, Skerries, Lusk, Rush, Malahide, and Clontarf.

In 1900, the boundaries of the city of Dublin were extended to include areas such as Kilmainham and Clontarf. These areas were transferred to city constituencies in 1918.

From 1918 to 1922, North Dublin was defined as:

The rural districts of Balrothery, Celbridge No. 2 and North Dublin, and that part of the rural district of South Dublin consisting of the district electoral divisions of Clondalkin, Palmerstown and Tallaght.

== History ==
Prior to the 1885 general election, the county was the undivided two-member County Dublin constituency. Under the Redistribution of Seats Act 1885, the county was divided into two single-member divisions of North Dublin and South Dublin. Under the Redistribution of Seats (Ireland) Act 1918, the parliamentary representation of the administrative county was increased from two to four divisions. South Dublin was extended to the west, with the creation of two new divisions of Pembroke and Rathmines.

At the 1918 general election, Sinn Féin issued an election manifesto in which it called for a "establishment of a constituent assembly comprising persons chosen by Irish constituencies". After the election, Sinn Féin invited all those elected for Irish constituencies to sit as members of Dáil Éireann, termed Teachta Dála (or TD, known in English as a Deputy). In practice, only those elected for Sinn Féin attended. This included Frank Lawless, elected for North Dublin.

Under the Government of Ireland Act 1920, the area was combined with the Pembroke, Rathmines and South Dublin Divisions to form Dublin County, a 6-seat constituency for the Southern Ireland House of Commons and a two-seat constituency at Westminster. Sinn Féin treated the 1921 election for the Southern Ireland House of Commons as part of the election to the Second Dáil. The six seats were won uncontested by Sinn Féin. Lawless was one of the six TDs for Dublin County.

Under s. 1(4) of the Irish Free State (Agreement) Act 1922, no writ was to be issued "for a constituency in Ireland other than a constituency in Northern Ireland". Therefore, no vote was held in County Dublin at the 1922 United Kingdom general election on 15 November 1922, shortly before the Irish Free State left the United Kingdom on 6 December 1922.

== Members of Parliament ==
Election	Member	Party
2 December 1885	J. J. Clancy	Irish Parliamentary
1891	J. J. Clancy	Irish National League (Parnellite)
5 October 1900	J. J. Clancy	Irish Parliamentary
14 December 1918	Frank Lawless	Sinn Féin
1922	constituency abolished	

== Elections ==
=== Elections in the 1880s ===
1885 general election: North Dublin
Party	Candidate	Votes	%	±%
Irish Parliamentary	J. J. Clancy	7,560	84.1	
Irish Conservative	William Caldbeck Roper-Caldbeck	1,425	15.9	
Majority		6,135	68.2	
Turnout		8,985	72.9	
Registered electors		12,329		
Irish Parliamentary win (new seat)				

1886 general election: North Dublin
Party	Candidate	Votes	%	±%
Irish Parliamentary	J. J. Clancy	Unopposed		
Irish Parliamentary hold				

=== Elections in the 1890s ===
1892 general election: North Dublin
Party	Candidate	Votes	%	±%
Irish National League	J. J. Clancy	3,991	47.9	N/A
Irish National Federation	Joseph Mooney	2,696	32.4	N/A
Irish Unionist	Edward Hamilton Woods	1,638	19.7	New
Majority		1,295	15.5	N/A
Turnout		8,325	73.0	N/A
Registered electors		11,400		
Irish National League gain from Irish Parliamentary		Swing	N/A	

1895 general election: North Dublin
Party	Candidate	Votes	%	±%
Irish National League	J. J. Clancy	4,520	66.5	+18.6
Irish Unionist	Daniel Wilson	2,280	33.5	+13.8
Majority		2,240	33.0	+17.5
Turnout		6,800	59.8	−13.2
Registered electors		11,378		
Irish National League hold		Swing	+2.4	

=== Elections in the 1900s ===
1900 general election: North Dublin
Party	Candidate	Votes	%	±%
Irish Parliamentary	J. J. Clancy	Unopposed		
Irish Parliamentary hold				

1906 general election: North Dublin
Party	Candidate	Votes	%	±%
Irish Parliamentary	J. J. Clancy	Unopposed		
Irish Parliamentary hold				

=== Elections in the 1910s ===
January 1910 general election: North Dublin
Party	Candidate	Votes	%	±%
Irish Parliamentary	J. J. Clancy	Unopposed		
Irish Parliamentary hold				

December 1910 general election: North Dublin
Party	Candidate	Votes	%	±%
Irish Parliamentary	J. J. Clancy	Unopposed		
Irish Parliamentary hold				

1918 general election: North Dublin
Party	Candidate	Votes	%	±%
Sinn Féin	Frank Lawless	9,138	67.4	New
Irish Parliamentary	J. J. Clancy	4,428	32.6	N/A
Majority		4,710	34.8	N/A
Turnout		13,566	68.5	N/A
Registered electors		19,799		
Sinn Féin gain from Irish Parliamentary		Swing	N/A	

== Notes, citations and sources ==
=== External links ===
- Dáil Éireann Members Database Office of the Houses of the Oireachtas
- Dublin Historic Maps: Parliamentary & Dail Constituencies 1780–1969 (a work in progress)
