= Thomas Edward Taylor =

British politician

The Right Honourable Thomas Edward Taylor
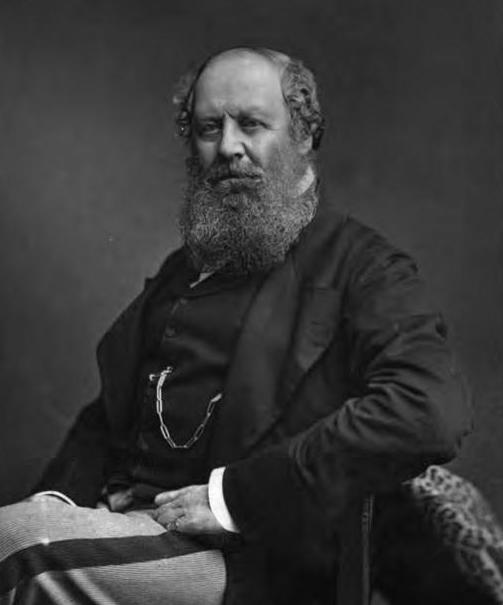

Parliamentary Secretary to the Treasury
- In office 14 July 1866 – 7 November 1868
- Monarch: Victoria
- Prime Minister: The Earl of Derby; Benjamin Disraeli
- Preceded by: Hon. Henry Brand
- Succeeded by: Hon. Gerard Noel

Chancellor of the Duchy of Lancaster
- In office 7 November 1868 – 1 December 1868
- Monarch: Victoria
- Prime Minister: Benjamin Disraeli
- Preceded by: John Wilson-Patten
- Succeeded by: The Lord Dufferin and Clandeboye
- In office 2 March 1874 – 21 April 1880
- Monarch: Victoria
- Prime Minister: Benjamin Disraeli
- Preceded by: John Bright
- Succeeded by: John Bright

Personal details
- Born: 17 March 1811
- Died: 3 February 1883 (aged 71)
- Party: Conservative
- Spouse(s): Louisa Tollemache (d. 1928)
- Children: 5

Thomas Edward Taylor (17 March 1811 – 3 February 1883), was a British Conservative Party politician. He served as Chancellor of the Duchy of Lancaster in 1868 and between 1874 and 1880 under Benjamin Disraeli.

== Background and education ==
Taylor was the eldest son of Reverend Edward Taylor, fourth son of Thomas Taylor, 1st Earl of Bective (whose eldest son was created Marquess of Headfort in 1800). His mother was Marianne St Leger, daughter of the Honourable Richard St Leger. One of his two brothers, General Sir Richard Taylor (1819–1904) enjoyed a distinguished career in the British Army. He was educated at Eton.

== Military career ==
Taylor was commissioned into the 6th Dragoon Guards as a Cornet (by purchase) on 10 February 1829. He was promoted to Lieutenant on 16 April 1831 and Captain on 2 November 1838 (both by purchase), but retired from the army on 1 May 1846. He was appointed Lieutenant-Colonel of the disembodied Royal Meath Militia on 12 December 1846 and continued in the position when the Militia was revived in 1852, until 1854.

== Political career ==
In 1841 Taylor was elected Member of Parliament for County Dublin, a seat he would hold for the rest of his life. He was an opposition whip from 1855 to 1858, and then served as a Lord of the Treasury (government whip) from 1858 to 1859 in the second administration of the Earl of Derby. When the Conservatives returned to power in 1866, Derby appointed Taylor Parliamentary Secretary to the Treasury, a post he held until 1868, the last year under the premiership of Benjamin Disraeli. He then served briefly under Disraeli as Chancellor of the Duchy of Lancaster from November to December 1868. The latter year he was also admitted to the Privy Council.

In the 1874 general election Taylor decisively defeated Charles Stewart Parnell, and was once again appointed Chancellor of the Duchy of Lancaster by Disraeli, which he remained until the Conservatives fell from power in 1880.

== Family ==
Taylor married Louisa, daughter of the Rev. Hugh Francis Tollemache, in 1862, at the age of 51. They had five children, three sons and two daughters. Taylor died on 3 February 1883, aged 71. Louisa died in April 1928.

== See also ==
- Marquess of Headfort
- Baron Langford

Parliament of the United Kingdom
Preceded by George Hampden Evans; Lord Brabazon	Member of Parliament for County Dublin; 1841 – 1883; With: James Hans Hamilton 1841–1863; Ion Hamilton 1863–1883	Succeeded by Ion Hamilton; Edward Robert King-Harman
Political offices
Preceded by Hon. Henry Brand	Parliamentary Secretary to the Treasury; 1866–1868	Succeeded by Hon. Gerard Noel
Preceded by John Wilson-Patten	Chancellor of the Duchy of Lancaster; 1868	Succeeded by The Lord Dufferin and Clandeboye
Preceded by John Bright	Chancellor of the Duchy of Lancaster; 1874–1880	Succeeded by John Bright
