= Abbotstown (townland) =

Area between Castleknock and Blanchardstown, Dublin, Ireland

Coordinates: 53°21′N 6°14′W

Abbotstown (Irish: Baile an Aba) is a townland in the civil parish of Castleknock in Fingal, Ireland. It is also the name of an historical demesne and country estate that is close to Blanchardstown. Historically the estate belonged to a number of aristocratic families. When these neighbouring families intermarried, their combined estates in Abbotstown and the townland of Sheephill were usually, though informally, called "Abbotstown". Despite a significant level of suburban development in the wider Dublin 15 area from the 1980s onwards, Abbotstown and Sheephill remained largely undeveloped, as the demesne was held by several state bodies. Today, the majority of the combined demesne remains unspoilt and now accommodates the administration offices and sporting grounds of the various bodies associated with Ireland's National Sports Campus. Abbotstown proper, however, does not contain any part of the campus nor the eponymous Abbotstown House itself. Instead, almost the whole of the land is given over to Connolly Hospital and the "St Francis Hospice".

== History ==
=== Barons of Castleknock ===
Abbotstown Demesne in the barony of Castleknock remained in the ownership of the Tyrell family up to the late 14th century when John Sergent and his wife Joan Tyrell, sister to the last Tyrell Baron of Castleknock, took up residence.

=== Clements family ===
By the 17th century the estate had passed to Sir John Dungan who owned one thatched house, several cottages and an old church at Abbotstown. Later, the lands at Abbotstown were owned by the Clements family, ancestors to the Earls of Leitrim and famous for the fact that one of their number was Nathaniel Clements, Chief Ranger in the Phoenix Park where his residence later became the official residence of the President of Ireland, Áras an Uachtaráin.

=== Baronets of Abbotstown ===
The most famous family to live on the lands at Abbotstown were the Falkiner family who became Baronets of Abbotstown in 1812. The Falkiners married into the Hamilton family who lived on the neighbouring estate of Sheephill and in 1832 both estates were amalgamated by the Hamiltons and a new residence, Abbotstown House, was built as the family seat.

=== Barons HolmPatrick of Abbotstown ===
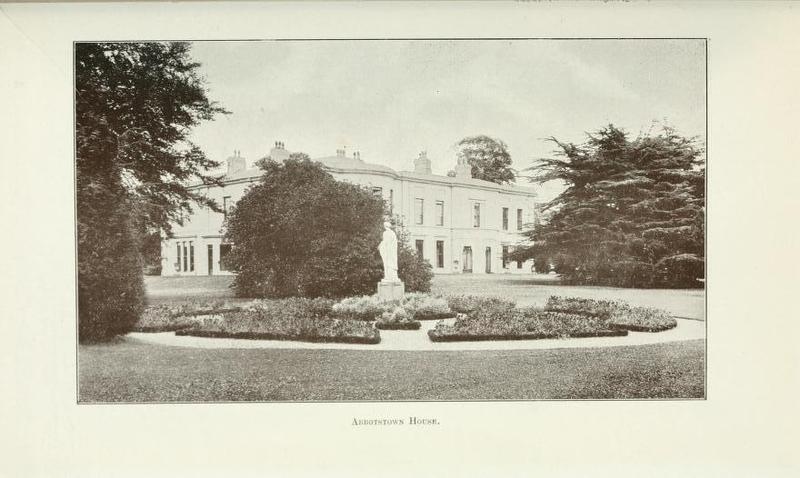
Abbotstown House, Castleknock, 19th century

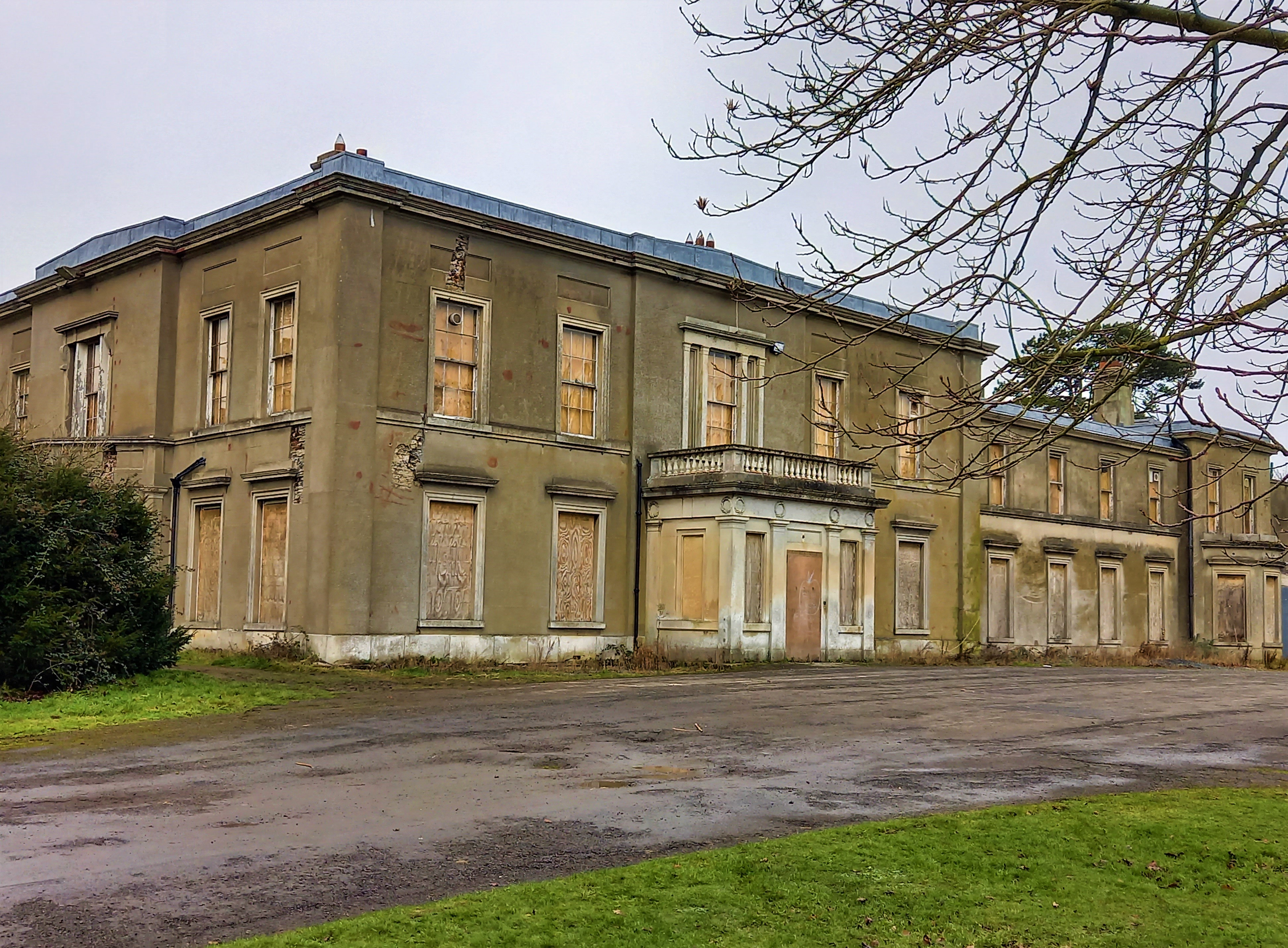
Abbotstown House in 2021 from the same perspective

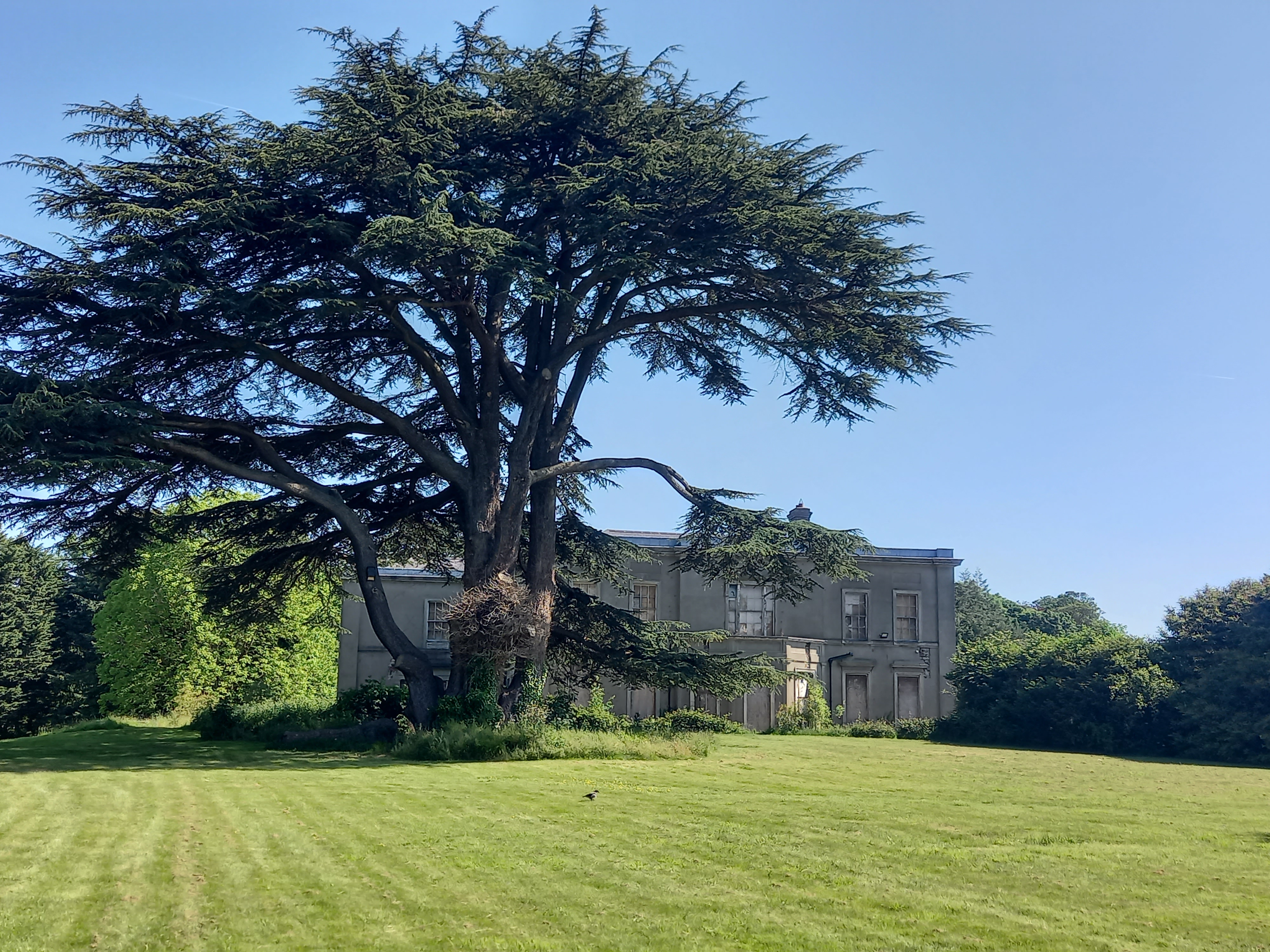
Western lawn of Abbotstown House, June 2023

Ion Trant Hamilton was the Lord Lieutenant of County Dublin and Member of Parliament for County Dublin. He was ennobled in 1897 by Queen Victoria as Baron HolmPatrick and Abbotstown House remained the principal seat in Castleknock until 1947 when James Hans Hamilton, 3rd Baron HolmPatrick (1928–1991), lost part of his lands under a Compulsory Purchase Order to allow for the building of James Connolly Memorial Hospital.

The Barons HolmPatrick of Abbotstown continued to be associated with Castleknock until quite recently and are buried in the graveyard at St. Brigid's Church (Church of Ireland) in Castleknock, however the current baron, the Hon. Hans James David Hamilton, resides in Cornwall, England.

=== State ownership ===
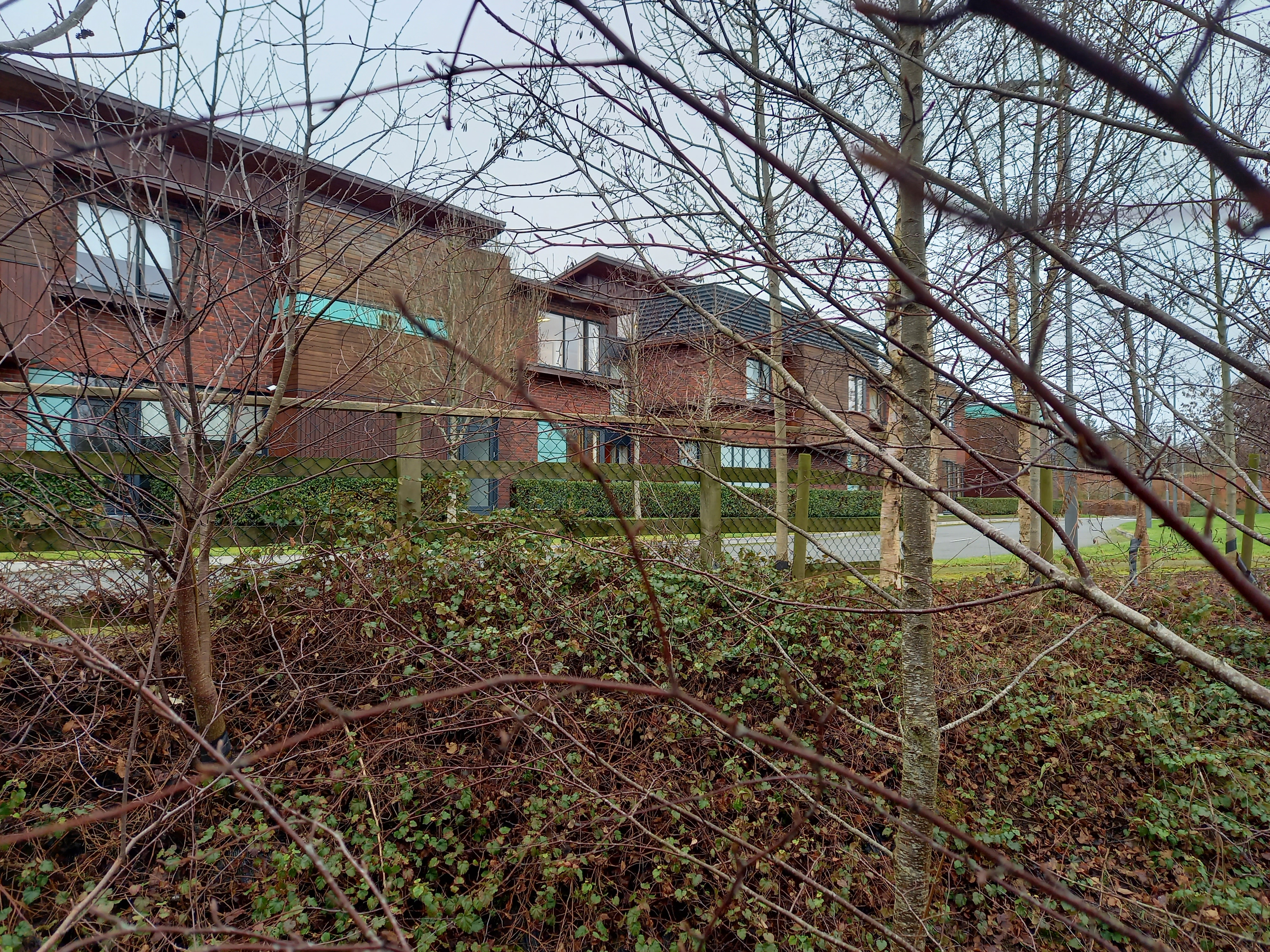
Rear of St Francis Hospice

Lord HolmPatrick sold Abbotstown to the Marine Institute of Ireland, who were located at Abbotstown House until 2005, while much of the demesne was used by the Department of Agriculture for agricultural research including cattle and other breeding programs, the whole being managed by the Office of Public Works.

In 2005, the house was acquired by the Government of Ireland for Sports Campus Ireland. In the late 1990s half of the original lands acquired from Lord HolmPatrick by the health board were sold for the construction of Waterville, a private housing development.
