= James Hans Hamilton =

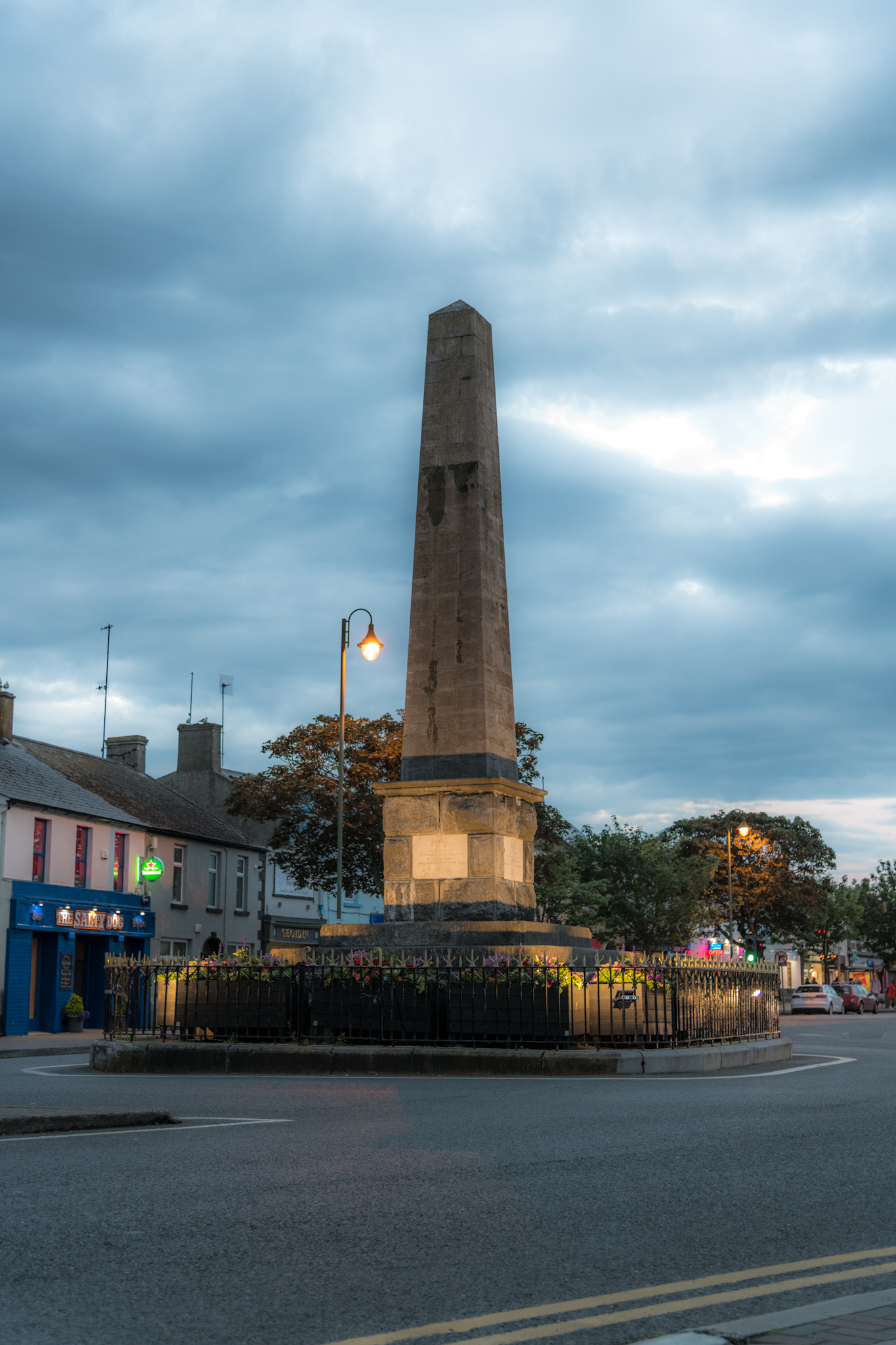
Hamilton Monument in Skerries, County Dublin

James Hans Hamilton (February 1810 – 30 June 1863), was an Anglo-Irish Member of Parliament.

Hamilton was the son of Hans Hamilton and Anne Mitchell. He matriculated at Christ Church, Oxford on 17 June 1828. He was elected to the House of Commons for County Dublin in 1841, a seat he held until 1863. Hamilton married Caroline Trant, daughter of John Frederick Trant, an Anglo-Irish gentleman, nephew of John FitzGibbon, 1st Earl of Clare. He died in June 1863, aged 53. His son Ion succeeded him as Member of Parliament for County Dublin and was elevated to the peerage as Baron HolmPatrick in 1897.

A monument to him was erected in Skerries, County Dublin in 1870.

== Notes ==
Parliament of the United Kingdom
Preceded by George Hampden Evans; Lord Ardee	Member of Parliament for County Dublin; 1841 – 1863; With: Thomas Edward Taylor	Succeeded by Thomas Edward Taylor; Ion Trant Hamilton
