= Hans Hamilton =

British politician

Hans Hamilton (c. 1758 – 22 December 1822) was an Anglo-Irish Member of Parliament.

== Early life ==
He was the first son of James Hamilton of Sheephill and Holmpatrick, Deputy Prothonotary of the Court of King's Bench, and his first wife Hannah Phillips and the grandson of James Hamilton, Member of Parliament for Newry from 1723 and Carlow from 1727.

== Career ==
Hamilton sat for County Dublin in the Irish House of Commons from 1798 until the Act of Union in 1801 and was then appointed High Sheriff of County Dublin for 1803–04. He was subsequently elected to the British House of Commons for County Dublin, a seat he held until his death in December 1822.

== Personal life ==
He married Anne Mitchell, a daughter of Hugh Henry Mitchell and sister to Col. Hugh Henry Mitchell, who married Lady Harriett Somerset (a daughter of the 5th Duke of Beaufort). Together, they were the parents of five children, including:

- James Hans Hamilton (1810–1863), also an MP for County Dublin; he married Caroline Trant, daughter of John Frederick Trant (a nephew of John FitzGibbon, 1st Earl of Clare) and Caroline Brooke (sister of Lt.-Gen. Sir Arthur Brooke).

He died just before Christmas 1822, "of a most painful and tedious illness".

=== Descendants ===
Through his son James, he was a grandfather of Ion Trant Hamilton (1839–1898), who also represented County Dublin in Parliament. The latter was raised to the peerage as Baron HolmPatrick in 1897. It was said that a peerage had been his grandfather's dearest wish, but his efforts to obtain one were unsuccessful; he also lobbied hard for the advancement of his relatives.

Parliament of Ireland
Preceded by John Finlay; Sir Edward Newenham	Member of Parliament for County Dublin; 1798 – 1801; With: Frederick John Falkiner	Succeeded by Parliament of the United Kingdom
Parliament of the United Kingdom
New constituency	Member of Parliament for County Dublin; 1801 – 1822; With: Frederick John Falkiner 1801–1807; Richard Wogan Talbot 1807–1823	Succeeded by Richard Wogan Talbot; Henry White
