= County Dublin (UK Parliament constituency) =

UK parliamentary constituency in Ireland, 1801–1885

- Former county constituency for the House of Commons
- County: County Dublin
- Major settlements: Blanchardstown, Swords, Balbriggan

1801–1885
- Seats: 2
- Created from: County Dublin constituency (IHC)
- Replaced by: North Dublin and South Dublin

County Dublin was a parliamentary constituency in Ireland, which returned two Members of Parliament (MPs) to the House of Commons of the Parliament of the United Kingdom.

The constituency was created under the Acts of Union 1800, replacing the constituency of County Dublin in the Irish House of Commons. Under the Redistribution of Seats Act 1885, before the 1885 general election, it was replaced with two new county divisions, South Dublin and North Dublin.

== Boundaries ==
This constituency comprised the whole of County Dublin, except for the area of the borough constituency of Dublin City. The borough comprised the whole of the county of the city of Dublin and the portion of the county at large within the Circular Road.

A Topographical Directory of Ireland, published in 1837, describes some aspects of the Parliamentary history of the county.

Two knights of the shire are returned to the Imperial parliament, who are elected at the county court-house at Kilmainham : the number of electors registered under the 2d of William IV., c. 88, up to Feb. 1st, 1837, is 2728, of which 788 were £50, 407 £20, and 622 £10, freeholders; 18 £50, 427 £20, and 423 £10, leaseholders; and 12 £50, 30 £20, and 1 £10, rent-chargers : the number that voted at the last general election was 1480. Prior to the Union, the boroughs of Swords and Newcastle sent each two members to the Irish House of Commons.

== Members of Parliament ==
Year	First member	First party	Second member	Second party
1801, 1 January	Hans Hamilton	Tory	Sir Frederick Falkiner, Bt	Tory
1807, 26 May	Hans Hamilton	Tory	Richard Talbot	Whig
1823, 11 February	Henry White	Whig	Richard Talbot	Whig
1830, 16 August	Henry White	Whig	William Brabazon	Whig
1832, 22 December	Christopher Fitzsimon	Repeal Association	George Hampden Evans	Whig
1837, 7 August	William Brabazon	Whig	George Hampden Evans	Whig
1841, 16 July	James Hans Hamilton	Conservative	Thomas Edward Taylor	Conservative
1863, 22 April	Ion Hamilton	Conservative	Thomas Edward Taylor	Conservative
1883, 27 February	Ion Hamilton	Conservative	Edward King-Harman	Conservative
1885	Constituency divided: see South Dublin and North Dublin			

== Elections ==
=== Elections in the 1880s ===
By-election, 27 February 1883: County Dublin
Party	Candidate	Votes	%	±%
Irish Conservative	Edward King-Harman	2,514	63.6	N/A
Irish Parliamentary	Edward MacMahon	1,428	36.1	New
Irish Conservative	Thomas Hosea Guinness	13	0.3	N/A
Majority		1,086	27.5	N/A
Turnout		3,955	79.0	N/A
Registered electors		5,008		
Irish Conservative hold		Swing	N/A	

General election 1880: County Dublin
Party	Candidate	Votes	%	±%
Irish Conservative	Thomas Edward Taylor	Unopposed		
Irish Conservative	Ion Hamilton	Unopposed		
Registered electors		3,539		
Irish Conservative hold				
Irish Conservative hold				

=== Elections in the 1870s ===
By-election, 18 March 1874: Dublin County
Party	Candidate	Votes	%	±%
Irish Conservative	Thomas Edward Taylor	2,183	63.9	N/A
Home Rule	Charles Stewart Parnell	1,235	36.1	New
Majority		948	27.8	N/A
Turnout		3,418	81.5	N/A
Registered electors		4,193		
Irish Conservative hold		Swing	N/A	

- Caused by Taylor's appointment as Chancellor of the Duchy of Lancaster.

General election 1874: County Dublin
Party	Candidate	Votes	%	±%
Irish Conservative	Thomas Edward Taylor	Unopposed		
Irish Conservative	Ion Hamilton	Unopposed		
Registered electors		4,193		
Irish Conservative hold				
Irish Conservative hold				

=== Elections in the 1860s ===
General election 1868: County Dublin
Party	Candidate	Votes	%	±%
Irish Conservative	Ion Hamilton	2,174	39.4	+3.7
Irish Conservative	Thomas Edward Taylor	2,163	39.2	+3.2
Liberal	Peter Paul McSwiney	1,183	21.4	−6.8
Majority		980	17.8	+10.3
Turnout		3,352 (est)	75.1 (est)	−3.7
Registered electors		4,465		
Irish Conservative hold		Swing	+3.6	
Irish Conservative hold		Swing	+3.3	

5829

General election 1865: County Dublin
Party	Candidate	Votes	%	±%
Irish Conservative	Thomas Edward Taylor	2,100	36.0	N/A
Irish Conservative	Ion Hamilton	2,083	35.7	N/A
Liberal	Charles William White	1,646	28.2	New
Majority		437	7.5	N/A
Turnout		3,738 (est)	78.8 (est)	N/A
Registered electors		4,744		
Irish Conservative hold		Swing	N/A	
Irish Conservative hold		Swing	N/A	

Following the election, a publication was printed listing the names of those who had voted in the July 1865 election, and for whom.

By-election, 22 April 1863: County Dublin
Party	Candidate	Votes	%	±%
Irish Conservative	Ion Hamilton	Unopposed		
Registered electors		4,894		
Irish Conservative hold				

- Caused by Hamilton's resignation.

=== Elections in the 1850s ===
General election 1859: County Dublin
Party	Candidate	Votes	%	±%
Irish Conservative	James Hans Hamilton	Unopposed		
Irish Conservative	Thomas Edward Taylor	Unopposed		
Registered electors		6,251		
Conservative hold				
Conservative hold				

By-election, 11 March 1858: County Dublin
Party	Candidate	Votes	%	±%
Irish Conservative	Thomas Edward Taylor	Unopposed		
Conservative hold				

- Caused by Taylor's appointment as a Lord Commissioner of the Treasury

General election 1857: County Dublin
Party	Candidate	Votes	%	±%
Irish Conservative	James Hans Hamilton	2,451	38.0	+8.8
Irish Conservative	Thomas Edward Taylor	2,338	36.3	+7.3
Whig	Charles Compton William Domvile	1,659	25.7	−16.1
Majority		679	10.6	+2.6
Turnout		4,054 (est)	66.2 (est)	−2.8
Registered electors		6,123		
Conservative hold		Swing	+8.4	
Conservative hold		Swing	+7.7	

General election 1852: County Dublin
Party	Candidate	Votes	%	±%
Irish Conservative	James Hans Hamilton	1,962	29.2	N/A
Irish Conservative	Thomas Edward Taylor	1,946	29.0	N/A
Whig	Augustus Craven	1,410	21.0	New
Whig	John Lentaigne	1,396	20.8	New
Majority		536	8.0	N/A
Turnout		3,357 (est)	69.0 (est)	N/A
Registered electors		4,864		
Conservative hold		Swing	N/A	
Conservative hold		Swing	N/A	

=== Elections in the 1840s ===
General election 1847: County Dublin
Party	Candidate	Votes	%	±%
Irish Conservative	James Hans Hamilton	Unopposed		
Irish Conservative	Thomas Edward Taylor	Unopposed		
Registered electors		3,278		
Conservative hold				
Conservative hold				

General election 1841: County Dublin
Party	Candidate	Votes	%	±%
Irish Conservative	James Hans Hamilton	1,051	25.6	New
Irish Conservative	Thomas Edward Taylor	1,042	25.4	New
Whig	William Brabazon	1,009	24.6	N/A
Whig	George Hampden Evans	1,006	24.5	N/A
Majority		33	0.8	N/A
Turnout		2,054 (est)	72.8 (est)	N/A
Registered electors		2,820		
Conservative gain from Whig		Swing	N/A	
Conservative gain from Whig		Swing	N/A	

=== Elections in the 1830s ===
General election 1837: County Dublin
Party	Candidate	Votes	%
Whig	William Brabazon	Unopposed	
Whig	George Hampden Evans	Unopposed	
Registered electors		2,820	
Whig hold			
Whig gain from Repeal			

General election 1835: County Dublin
Party	Candidate	Votes	%	±%
Repeal (Whig)	Christopher Fitzsimon	878	35.6	+3.9
Whig	George Hampden Evans	825	33.4	+5.4
Irish Conservative	James Hans Hamilton	764	30.9	+5.2
Irish Conservative	John Johnston	2	0.0	N/A
Turnout		1,530	61.7	−22.5
Registered electors		2,478		
Majority		53	2.2	−14.9
Repeal hold		Swing	+0.7	
Majority		61	2.5	+0.2
Whig hold		Swing	+1.4	

General election 1832: County Dublin
Party	Candidate	Votes	%
Repeal	Christopher Fitzsimon	958	31.7
Whig	George Hampden Evans	847	28.0
Irish Conservative	George Alexander Hamilton	777	25.7
Whig	William Brabazon	442	14.6
Turnout		1,705	84.2
Registered electors		2,025	
Majority		516	17.1
Repeal gain from Whig			
Majority		70	2.3
Whig hold			

General election 1831: County Dublin
Party	Candidate	Votes	%
Whig	Henry White	Unopposed	
Whig	William Brabazon	Unopposed	
Registered electors		1,649	
Whig hold			
Whig hold			

General election 1830: County Dublin
Party	Candidate	Votes	%	±%
Whig	William Brabazon	522	35.9	
Whig	Henry White	417	28.6	
Tory	George Alexander Hamilton	343	23.6	
Whig	Richard Talbot	174	12.0	
Majority		74	5.0	
Turnout		867	52.6	
Registered electors		1,649		
Whig hold		Swing		
Whig hold				
