= Ion Hamilton, 1st Baron HolmPatrick =

Ion Trant Hamilton, 1st Baron HolmPatrick, PC (Ire) (14 July 1839 – 6 March 1898), alternately Holm Patrick, was an Anglo-Irish Member of Parliament.

HolmPatrick was the son of James Hans Hamilton and Caroline Trant, and grandson of Hans Hamilton. He was educated at Cambridge University. He succeeded his father and grandfather as Member of Parliament for County Dublin in 1863, a seat he held until 1885. He was admitted to the Irish Privy Council in 1887 and also served as Lord Lieutenant of County Dublin from 1892 to 1898. In the 1897 Diamond Jubilee Honours, he was raised to the peerage as Baron HolmPatrick, of HolmPatrick, in the County of Dublin.

Lord HolmPatrick married Lady Victoria Alexandrina Wellesley, daughter of Major-General Lord Charles Wellesley, granddaughter of Arthur Wellesley, 1st Duke of Wellington, and goddaughter of Queen Victoria, at St. George's Church in Hanover Square on 6 September 1877. He died rather unexpectedly at his home, Abbotstown House, in Castleknock on 6 March 1898, aged 58. He was eulogised in The Times as a "staunch Conservative" who was "always tolerant of the opinions of those whose principles were not in harmony with his own. His speeches were cast in a practical mould, and they never disclosed anything like a rancorous spirit. In social life he was deservedly esteemed by all classes. His sympathy with objects of charity assumed on all appropriate occasions a practical form, and in contributing financial aid he refused to be fettered by considerations of party or creed."

He and his wife had five daughters and one son, Hans Wellesley Hamilton, who succeeded him in the barony. Lady HolmPatrick died 31 July 1933.

Coat of arms of Ion Hamilton, 1st Baron HolmPatrick
| Crest A demi-antelope Argent armed and unguled Or charged with a mullet Gules holding between the hoofs a human heart as in the arms. Escutcheon Gules a mullet Argent between three cinquefoils pierced Ermine on a chief Or a heart of the first. Supporters Dexter an antelope Argent attired Or sinister a lion Gules each having pendant from a collar flory counter-flory Or a shield Ermine charged with a heart Gules. Motto Qualis Ab Incepto |

Parliament of the United Kingdom
| Preceded by Thomas Edward Taylor; James Hans Hamilton | Member of Parliament for County Dublin; 1863 – 1885; With: Thomas Edward Taylor 1863–83; Edward Robert King-Harman 1883–85 | Constituency abolished |
Honorary titles
| Preceded by The Viscount Monck | Lord Lieutenant of Dublin; 1892–1898 | Succeeded by The Earl of Meath |
Peerage of the United Kingdom
| New creation | Baron HolmPatrick; 1897–1898 | Succeeded by Hans Wellesley Hamilton |
