= List of lord-lieutenants in the United Kingdom =

Lord-lieutenants are appointed in England and Wales, Scotland, and Northern Ireland.

== Lord-lieutenants ==
| Lieutenancy area | Name | Date |
|---|---|---|
| Aberdeenshire | Sandy Manson | 20 March 2020 |
| Angus | Patricia Sawers | 25 August 2019 |
| Antrim | David McCorkell | 29 June 2019 |
| Argyll and Bute | Jane MacLeod | 14 July 2020 |
| Armagh | Nicholas Alexander, 7th Earl of Caledon | 15 May 1989 |
| Ayrshire and Arran | Iona McDonald | 26 October 2017 |
| Banffshire | Andrew Simpson | 4 August 2019 |
| Bedfordshire | Susan Lousanda | 6 September 2022 |
| Belfast | Dame Fionnuala Jay-O'Boyle | 6 July 2014 |
| Berkshire | Andrew Try | 24 October 2023 |
| Berwickshire | Jeanna Swan | 25 April 2014 |
| Bristol | Lois Golding | 24 April 2017 |
| Buckinghamshire | Elizabeth Curzon, Countess Howe | 26 June 2020 |
| Caithness | John Thurso, 3rd Viscount Thurso | 17 August 2017 |
| Cambridgeshire | Julie Spence | 4 April 2017 |
| Cheshire | Lady Redmond | 25 August 2021 |
| Clackmannanshire | Lieutenant Colonel Johnny Stewart | 5 June 2014 |
| Clwyd | Harry Fetherstonhaugh | 17 January 2013 |
| Cornwall | Colonel Sir Edward Bolitho | 19 September 2011 |
| Cumbria | Alexander Scott | 6 July 2023 |
| Derbyshire | Elizabeth Fothergill | July 2020 |
| Devon | David Fursdon | 17 April 2015 |
| Dorset | Michael Dooley | 5 September 2024 |
| Down | Gawn Rowan Hamilton | 26 September 2021 |
| Dumfries | Lady MacGregor | 10 February 2016 |
| Dunbartonshire | Jill Young | 12 August 2020 |
| Dundee | Bill Campbell | 20 May 2022 |
| Durham | Susan Snowdon | 8 March 2013 |
| Dyfed | Sara Edwards | 7 February 2016 |
| East Lothian | Roderick Uruquhart | 15 March 2021 |
| East Riding of Yorkshire | James Dick | 25 June 2019 |
| East Sussex | Andrew Blackman | 18 August 2021 |
| Edinburgh | Robert Aldridge | 26 May 2022 |
| Essex | Jennifer Tolhurst | 5 August 2017 |
| Fermanagh | Alan Brooke, 3rd Viscount Brookeborough | 9 July 2012 |
| Fife | Robert Balfour | 22 January 2015 |
| Glasgow | Jacqueline McLaren | 19 May 2022 |
| Gloucestershire | Edward Gillespie | 28 October 2018 |
| Greater London | Sir Alastair King | 14 October 2026 |
| Greater Manchester | Diane Hawkins | 4 July 2022 |
| Gwent | Brigadier Robert Aitken | 24 March 2016 |
| Gwynedd | Edmund Seymour Bailey | 16 April 2014 |
| Hampshire | Nigel Atkinson | 11 September 2014 |
| Herefordshire | Edward Harley | 15 April 2020 |
| Hertfordshire | Robert Voss | 4 August 2017 |
| Inverness | James Wotherspoon | 4 August 2021 |
| Isle of Wight | Susan Sheldon | 25 March 2019 |
| Kent | Annabel Campbell, Baroness Colgrain | 21 April 2020 |
| Kincardineshire | Alastair Macphie | 1 October 2020 |
| Kirkcudbright | Lord Matthew Sinclair | 29 July 2021 |
| Lanarkshire | Lady Haughey | 13 November 2017 |
| Lancashire | Amanda Parker | 2 August 2023 |
| Leicestershire | Mike Kapur | 14 June 2018 |
| Lincolnshire | Toby Dennis | 23 February 2015 |
| City of London | Dame Susan Langley | 7 November 2025 |
| City of Londonderry | Ian Crowe | 12 January 2023 |
| County Londonderry | Alison Millar | 12 June 2018 |
| Merseyside | Peter Oliver | 16 December 2025 |
| Mid Glamorgan | Peter Vaughan | 17 April 2019 |
| Midlothian | Sarah Barron | 3 April 2025 |
| Moray | Major General Seymour Monro | 29 January 2020 |
| Nairn | George Asher | 19 January 2018 |
| Norfolk | Lady Dannatt | 28 May 2019 |
| Northamptonshire | James Saunders Watson | 30 March 2020 |
| Northumberland | Caroline Pryer | 1 May 2024 |
| North Yorkshire | Johanna Ropner | 6 November 2018 |
| Nottinghamshire | Professor Veronica Pickering | 2 March 2024 |
| Orkney | Elaine Grieve | 29 January 2020 |
| Oxfordshire | Marjorie Glasgow | 1 October 2021 |
| Perth and Kinross | Gordon Leckie | 23 July 2019 |
| Powys | Tia Jones | 10 September 2018 |
| Renfrewshire | Colonel Peter McCarthy | 13 March 2019 |
| Ross and Cromarty | Joanie Whiteford | 29 May 2019 |
| Roxburgh, Ettrick and Lauderdale | John Jeffrey | 30 June 2025 |
| Rutland | Sarah Furness | 3 April 2018 |
| Shropshire | Anna Turner | 3 January 2019 |
| Shetland | Lindsay William Tulloch | 3 April 2024 |
| Somerset | Mohammed Saddiq | 29 October 2022 |
| South Glamorgan | Morfudd Meredith | 5 July 2016 |
| South Yorkshire | Dame Hilary Chapman | November 2021 |
| Staffordshire | Elizabeth Barnes | 15 July 2025 |
| Stirling and Falkirk | Colonel Charles Wallace | 24 February 2025 |
| Suffolk | Mark John Pendlington | 16 April 2026 |
| Surrey | Neelam Dharni Devesher | 6 September 2026 |
| Sutherland | Major General Patrick Marriott | 1 August 2022 |
| Tweeddale | Catherine Maxwell Stuart, 21st Lady of Traquair | 28 August 2024 |
| Tyne and Wear | Lucy Winskell | 21 February 2022 |
| Tyrone | Robert Lowry Scott | 5 July 2009 |
| Warwickshire | Timothy Cox | 2 April 2013 |
| Western Isles | Iain Macaulay | 8 March 2022 |
| West Glamorgan | Roberta Fleet | 16 March 2020 |
| West Lothian | Moira Niven | 20 September 2017 |
| West Midlands | Derrick Anderson | 6 August 2024 |
| West Sussex | Lady Emma Barnard | 23 May 2022 |
| West Yorkshire | Prof. Adeeba Malik | 22 December 2025 |
| Wigtown | Aileen Brewis | 20 February 2020 |
| Wiltshire | Dame Sarah Troughton | February 2012 |
| Worcestershire | Beatrice Grant | 17 March 2023 |

== See also ==
- Lord Lieutenant
- Deputy Lieutenant
- Ceremonial counties of England
- Lieutenancy areas of Scotland
- Preserved counties of Wales
- Lists of Lord Lieutenancies
- List of French prefects (in French)
