= Lists of custodes rotulorum =

The Custos rotulorum, Latin for "keeper of the rolls" within civil government, is the keeper of the English, Welsh and Northern Irish (and, prior to 1922, southern Irish) county records. The Custos is also the principal Justice of the Peace of the county and keeper of the records of the sessions of the local courts and, by virtue of those offices, the highest civil official in the county. The position is now largely ceremonial and generally undertaken by the Lord Lieutenant of the county.

The office also exists in Jamaica.

== England ==
Custodes rotulorum of the historic counties of England
- Bedfordshire
- Berkshire
- Buckinghamshire
- Cambridgeshire
- Cheshire
- Cornwall
- Cumberland
- Derbyshire
- Devon
- Dorset
- Durham
- East Riding of Yorkshire
- Essex
- Gloucestershire
- Hampshire
- Herefordshire
- Hertfordshire
- Huntingdonshire
- Kent
- Lancashire
- Leicestershire
- Lincolnshire
- Middlesex
- Norfolk
- Northamptonshire
- North Riding of Yorkshire
- Northumberland
- Nottinghamshire
- Oxfordshire
- Rutland
- Shropshire
- Somerset
- Staffordshire
- Suffolk
- Surrey
- Sussex
- Warwickshire
- Westmorland
- West Riding of Yorkshire
- Wiltshire
- Worcestershire

== Wales ==
- Anglesey
- Brecknockshire
- Caernarvonshire
- Cardiganshire
- Carmarthenshire
- Denbighshire
- Flintshire
- Glamorgan
- Merionethshire
- Monmouthshire
- Montgomeryshire
- Pembrokeshire
- Radnorshire

== Ireland ==
- Antrim
- Armagh
- Carlow (merged with Lord Lieutenancy before 1838)
- Cavan
- Clare
- Cork
- Donegal
- Down
- Dublin
- Fermanagh (merged with Lord Lieutenancy before 1963)
- Galway
- Kerry (merged with Lord Lieutenancy before 1746)
- Kildare
- Kilkenny
- King's County
- Leitrim
- Limerick
- Londonderry
- Longford
- Louth (merged with Lord Lieutenancy before 1911)
- Mayo
- Meath
- Monaghan
- Queen's County
- Roscommon
- Sligo
- Tyrone
- Tipperary
- Waterford
- Westmeath
- Wexford
- Wicklow

== Jamaica ==
- St. Elizabeth Hon. Beryl Rochester, 10 February 2014 to date.

== See also ==
- Custos rotulorum
- Lists of lord lieutenancies
- The Custos Rotulorum Act, 2011 - Jamaica
