= Lists of lord lieutenancies =

A lord-lieutenant is the British monarch's personal representative in each lieutenancy area of the United Kingdom. Historically, each lieutenant was responsible for organising the county's militia. Lord-lieutenant is now an honorary titular position usually awarded to a retired notable person in the county.

== England ==
Lieutenancy areas from 1998
Lieutenancy areas 1974–1996
Lieutenancy areas 1889–1965
- Avon (from 1974 until 1996)
- Bedfordshire
- Berkshire
- Berwick-upon-Tweed (until 1974) – held jointly with Northumberland 1882–1974
- Bristol (until 1974 and from 1996) – held jointly with Gloucestershire 1882–1974
- Buckinghamshire
- Cambridgeshire
- Canterbury (until 1974) – held jointly with Kent 1872–1974
- Cheshire
- Chester (until 1974) – held jointly with Cheshire 1882–1974
- Cinque Ports (until 1889)
- City of London – held in Commission, headed by the Lord Mayor
- Cleveland (from 1974 until 1996)
- Cornwall
- Cumberland (until 1974)
- Cumbria (from 1974)
- Derbyshire
- Devon
- Dorset
- Durham
- East Riding of Yorkshire (Restoration until 1974 and from 1996)
- East Sussex (from 1974)
- Essex
- Exeter (until 1974) – held jointly with Devon 1882–1974
- Gloucestershire
- Gloucester (until 1974) – held jointly with Gloucestershire 1882–1974
- Greater London (from 1965)
- Greater Manchester (from 1974)
- Hampshire
- Herefordshire (until 1974 and from 1998)
- Hereford and Worcester (from 1974 until 1998)
- Hertfordshire
- Humberside (from 1974 until 1996)
- Huntingdon and Peterborough (from 1965 until 1974)
- Huntingdonshire (until 1965)
- Isle of Ely (until c. 16th)
- Isle of Wight (from 1974)
- Kent
- Kingston-upon-Hull (until 1974) – held jointly with East Riding of Yorkshire 1882–1974
- Lancashire
- Leicestershire
- Lichfield (until 1974) – held jointly with Staffordshire 1882–1974
- Lincolnshire
- Lincoln (until 1974) – held jointly with Lincolnshire 1882–1974
- County of London (from 1889 until 1965)
- Merseyside (from 1974)
- Middlesex (until 1965)
- Newcastle upon Tyne (until 1974) – held jointly with Northumberland 1882–1974
- Norfolk
- Norwich (until 1974) – held jointly with Norfolk 1882–1974
- Northamptonshire
- Northumberland
- Nottinghamshire
- Nottingham (until 1974) – held jointly with Nottinghamshire 1882–1974
- North Riding of Yorkshire (Restoration until 1974)
- North Yorkshire (from 1974)
- Oxfordshire
- Poole (until 1974) – held jointly with Dorset 1882–1974
- Rutland (until 1974 and from 1997)
- Shropshire
- Somerset
- Southampton (until 1974) – held jointly with Hampshire 1882–1974
- South Yorkshire (from 1974)
- Staffordshire
- Suffolk
- Surrey
- Sussex (until 1974)
- Tower Hamlets (until 1889)
- Tyne and Wear (from 1974)
- Warwickshire
- Westmorland (until 1974)
- West Midlands (from 1974)
- West Riding of Yorkshire (Restoration until 1974)
- West Sussex (from 1974)
- West Yorkshire (from 1974)
- Wiltshire
- Worcestershire (until 1974 and from 1998)
- Worcester (until 1974) – held jointly with Worcestershire 1882–1974
- Yorkshire (until Restoration)
- York (until 1974) – held jointly with West Riding of Yorkshire 1882–1974

== Scotland ==
- Aberdeen (from 1900)
- Aberdeenshire
- Angus
- Argyll and Bute (from 1975)
- Argyllshire (until 1975)
- Ayrshire (until 1975)
- Ayrshire and Arran (from 1975)
- Banffshire
- Berwickshire
- Buteshire (until 1975)
- Caithness
- Clackmannanshire
- Cromarty (until 1890)
- Dumfries
- Dunbartonshire
- Dundee (from 1894)
- East Lothian (from 1921)
- Edinburgh (known as the "Lord Lieutenant of the City and County of the City of Edinburgh, and the Liberties thereof" until 1975)
- Edinburghshire – renamed Midlothian 1921
- Elginshire – renamed Moray 1928
- Fife
- Forfarshire – renamed Angus 1928
- Glasgow (from 1893)
- Haddingtonshire – renamed East Lothian 1921
- Inverness
- Kincardineshire
- Kinross-shire (until 1975)
- Kirkcudbright
- Lanarkshire
- Linlithgowshire – renamed West Lothian 1921
- Midlothian
- Moray (known as Elgin or Elginshire until 1928)
- Nairn
- Orkney (from 1975)
- Orkney and Shetland (until 1975)
- Peeblesshire (until 1975)
- Perth and Kinross (from 1975)
- Perthshire (until 1975)
- Renfrewshire
- Ross and Cromarty (since 1890)
- Ross-shire (until 1890)
- Roxburgh, Ettrick and Lauderdale (since 1975)
- Roxburghshire (until 1975)
- Selkirkshire (until 1975)
- Shetland (from 1975)
- Stirling and Falkirk (from 1975)
- Stirlingshire (until 1975)
- Sutherland
- Tweeddale (from 1975)
- West Lothian (from 1921)
- Western Isles (from 1975)
- Wigtown

== Wales ==
- Anglesey (until 1974)
- Brecknockshire (until 1974)
- Caernarvonshire (until 1974)
- Cardiganshire (until 1974)
- Carmarthenshire (until 1974)
- Carmarthen (until 1974) – held jointly with Carmarthenshire 1882–1974
- Clwyd (from 1974)
- Denbighshire (until 1974)
- Dyfed (from 1974)
- Flintshire (until 1974)
- Glamorgan (until 1974)
- Gwent (from 1974)
- Gwynedd (from 1974)
- Haverfordwest (until 1974)
- Merionethshire (until 1974)
- Mid Glamorgan (from 1974)
- Monmouthshire (until 1974)
- Montgomeryshire (until 1974)
- Pembrokeshire (until 1974)
- Powys (from 1974)
- Radnorshire (until 1974)
- South Glamorgan (from 1974)
- West Glamorgan (from 1974)

== Ireland ==
- Lord Lieutenant of Ireland (until 1922)

=== Northern Ireland ===
- Antrim
- Armagh
- Belfast (from 1899)
- Down
- Fermanagh
- Londonderry (County)
- Londonderry (County Borough) Held jointly with County Londonderry 1882–1899
- Tyrone

=== Rest of Ireland ===
- Carlow (until 1922)
- Cavan (until 1922)
- Clare (until 1922)
- Cork (until 1922)
- Cork (County of the City) – usually held with County Cork (until 1922)
- Donegal (until 1922)
- Drogheda (County of the Town) (until 1899) – held jointly with County Louth 1882–1899
- Dublin (until 1922)
- Dublin (County of the City) (until 1922)
- Galway (until 1922)
- Galway (County of the Town) (until 1899) – held jointly with County Galway 1882–1899
- Kerry (until 1922)
- Kildare (until 1922)
- Kilkenny (until 1922)
- Kilkenny (County of the City) (until 1899) – jointly with County Kilkenny 1882–1899
- King's County (until 1922)
- Leitrim (until 1922)
- Limerick (until 1922)
- Limerick (County of the City) (until 1922) – usually held jointly with County Limerick
- Longford (until 1922)
- Louth (until 1922)
- Mayo (until 1922)
- Meath (until 1922)
- Monaghan (until 1922)
- Queen's County (until 1922)
- Roscommon (until 1922)
- Sligo (until 1922)
- Tipperary (until 1922)
- Waterford (until 1922)
- Waterford (County of the City) (until 1922) – held jointly with County Waterford 1882–1922
- Westmeath (until 1922)
- Wexford (until 1922)
- Wicklow (until 1922)

== See also ==
- Lieutenancy area
- Lists of subdivisions of the United Kingdom
- List of Shrievalties
- Lists of Custodes Rotulorum
- Ceremonial counties of England
- Counties of Ireland
- Lieutenancy areas of Scotland
- Preserved counties of Wales
