= Lieutenancy =

Lieutenancy may refer to:

== United Kingdom ==
=== Places ===
- Lieutenancy area, a separate area appointed a lord-lieutenant, including:
  - Ceremonial counties of England, formally known as "counties for the purposes of the lieutenancies"
  - Lieutenancy areas of Scotland
  - Counties of Northern Ireland, which are coextensive with lieutenancy areas
  - Preserved counties of Wales, used for purposes including lieutenancy

=== People ===
- Lord-lieutenant, the British monarch's personal representative in each lieutenancy area of the United Kingdom
- Deputy lieutenant, a Crown-appointed person who serves as one of several deputies to a lord-lieutenant
- Lord Lieutenant of Ireland, the chief governor of Ireland from 1690 to 1922

=== Law ===
- Lieutenancies Act 1997, a 1997 Act of Parliament

== Kingdom of Hungary ==
- Lieutenancy Council, a leading governmental institution between 1723 and 1848

== Italian-speaking monarchies ==
- Luogotenente, or "lieutenant," a high-ranking individual either designated serve as regent in the king's absence or to exercise monarchical powers in a particular territory of the kingdom on behalf of the king

== See also ==
- Lieutenant
- Lists of lord lieutenancies
- List of lord-lieutenants in the United Kingdom
- Stadtholder
