= Custos Rotulorum of County Antrim =

Highest civil officer in County Antrim, Ireland

The Custos Rotulorum of County Antrim was the highest civil officer in County Antrim, Ireland. The position was later combined with that of Lord Lieutenant of Antrim.

== Incumbents ==
- 1675–?1678 Arthur Chichester, 2nd Earl of Donegall (died 1678) (also Custos Rotulorum of Donegal, 1675-?1678)
- 1678–? Michael Hill (died 1693) (also Custos Rotulorum of Down 1678-?)
- 1680–? Alexander MacDonnell, 3rd Earl of Antrim (died 1699)
- ?–? Alexander Adair
- c.1788–?1806 George Macartney, 1st Earl Macartney (died 1806)
- 1806–1822 Francis Ingram-Seymour-Conway, 2nd Marquess of Hertford
- 1822–1842 Francis Charles Seymour-Conway, 3rd Marquess of Hertford

For later custodes rotulorum, see Lord Lieutenant of Antrim
