= South Yorkshire Joint Secretariat =

Logo

The South Yorkshire Joint Secretariat (SYJS) is a body established to provide support to the four joint authorities that were formed in South Yorkshire following the abolition of the South Yorkshire County Council in 1986. When the county council was abolished, joint-boards were established to manage policing, fire and rescue services, integrated transport and pensions on a county wide basis.

The four authorities supported by the joint secretariat are:

- South Yorkshire Mayoral Combined Authority
- South Yorkshire Fire and Rescue Authority
- South Yorkshire Passenger Transport Executive
- South Yorkshire Pensions Authority
- South Yorkshire Police and Crime Commissioner

The metropolitan county of South Yorkshire consists of four metropolitan districts; the City of Sheffield, the City of Doncaster, the Metropolitan Borough of Rotherham and the Metropolitan Borough of Barnsley which function as de facto unitary authorities.
