= South Yorkshire County Council =

Local authority of South Yorkshire, England (1974–1986)

- South Yorkshire
- Coat of arms of the South Yorkshire County Council

Type
- Type: Metropolitan County Council

History
- Established: 1 April 1974
- Disbanded: 31 March 1986
- Preceded by: West Riding of Yorkshire County Council
- Succeeded by: Barnsley Metropolitan Borough Council; Doncaster Metropolitan Borough Council; Rotherham Metropolitan Borough Council; Sheffield City Council; Various joint authorities; Sheffield City Region Combined Authority
- Seats: 100

Elections
- Last general election: 1981

Meeting place
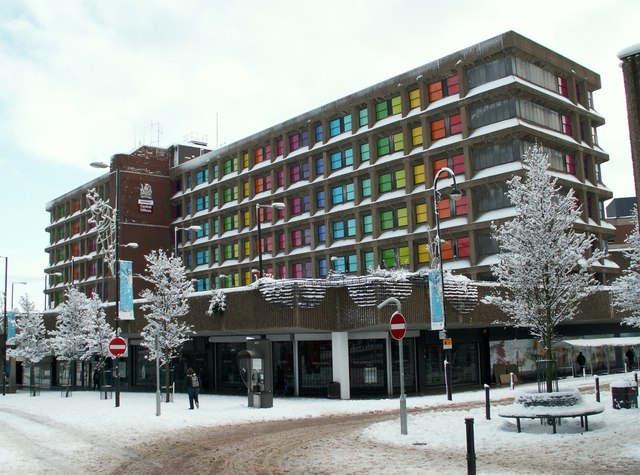
- County Hall, Kendray Street, Barnsley

The South Yorkshire County Council (SYCC) — also known as South Yorkshire Metropolitan County Council — was the top-tier local government authority for the metropolitan county of South Yorkshire from 1 April 1974 to 31 March 1986. A strategic authority, with responsibilities for roads, public transport, planning, emergency services and waste disposal, it was composed of 100 directly elected members drawn from the four metropolitan boroughs of South Yorkshire: Barnsley, Doncaster, Rotherham and Sheffield.

== History ==
SYCC was constituted by the Local Government Act 1972 and elections in 1973 resulted in the county council acting as a 'shadow authority' until the authority was formally established on 1 April 1974. SYCC was abolished on 31 March 1986, just 12 years after it was established, following the Local Government Act 1985. Its powers were transferred to the four metropolitan borough councils of South Yorkshire (which had shared power with SYCC): Barnsley Metropolitan Borough Council, Doncaster Metropolitan Borough Council, Rotherham Metropolitan Borough Council and Sheffield City Council.

== Political control ==
The first election to the council was held in 1973, initially operating as a shadow authority before coming into its powers on 1 April 1974. Throughout the council's existence, the Labour Party held a majority of the seats.

Party in control	Years
Labour	1974–1986

=== Leadership ===
The first leader of the council, Ron Ironmonger, had been the last leader of the old Sheffield City Council. The leaders of South Yorkshire County Council were:

Councillor	Party	From	To
Ron Ironmonger	Labour	1974	1979
Roy Thwaites	Labour	1979	1986

== Council elections ==
Year	Labour	Conservative	Liberals	Others
1973	82	13	1	4
1977	62	31	2	5
1981	82	14	3	1

- 1973 South Yorkshire County Council election
- 1977 South Yorkshire County Council election
- 1981 South Yorkshire County Council election

== Successor bodies ==
Following the abolition of SYCC in 1986, its administrative functions were mostly devolved to the four constituent metropolitan borough councils in South Yorkshire. In practice, many functions continued to be jointly administered by joint authorities supported by the South Yorkshire Joint Secretariat. Although the county council was abolished, South Yorkshire remains a metropolitan and ceremonial county with a Lord Lieutenant of South Yorkshire and a High Sheriff.

The Sheffield City Region Combined Authority was established on 1 April 2014 as the strategic top-tier authority for South Yorkshire. The combined authority exercises some functions formerly held by SYCC, with powers over transport and economic development.

== See also ==
- People's Republic of South Yorkshire
