= Howden Edge =

Hill in South Yorkshire, England

Coordinates: 53.44514°N 1.71993°W

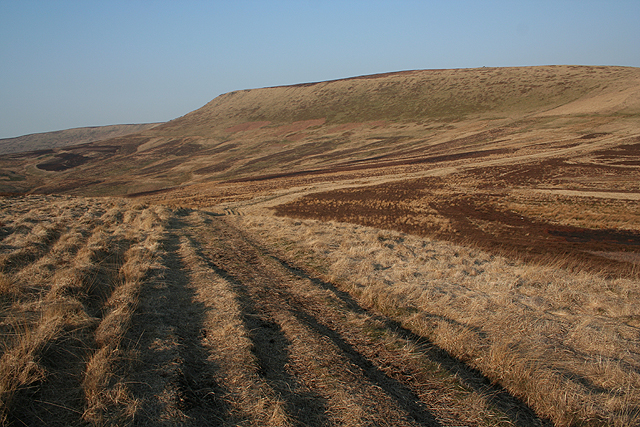
Howden Edge from Nether Hey

Howden Edge (grid reference SK187943) is a hill in the north-east of the Upper Derwent Valley area of the Peak District National Park in England.The highest point on Howden Edge, marked only on 1:25,000 scale maps and larger, is High Stones at 548 m (1,798 ft), the highest point within the boundaries of both the City of Sheffield and South Yorkshire, England.

Howden Edge is north-east of Howden Reservoir and north of Abbey Brook.
