= South Yorkshire =

County of England

- Metropolitan and ceremonial county
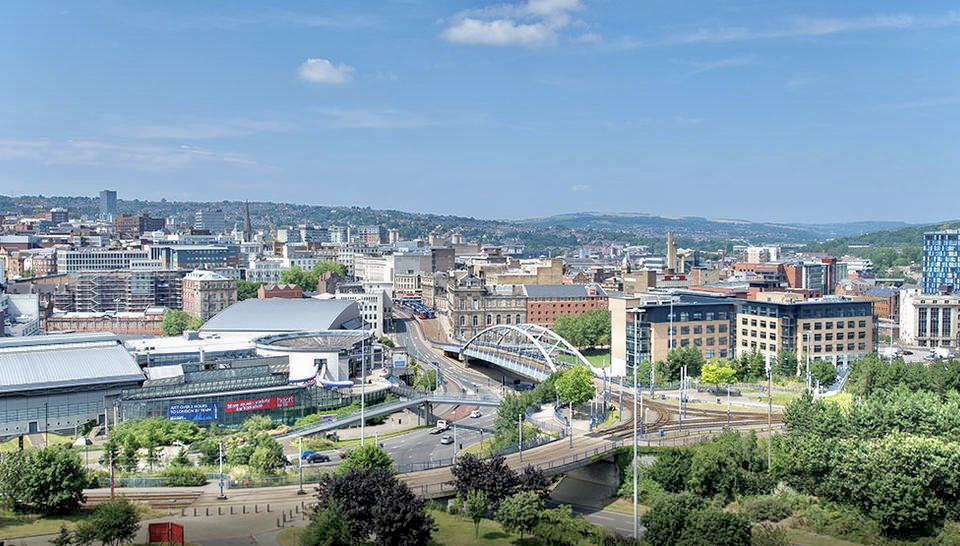
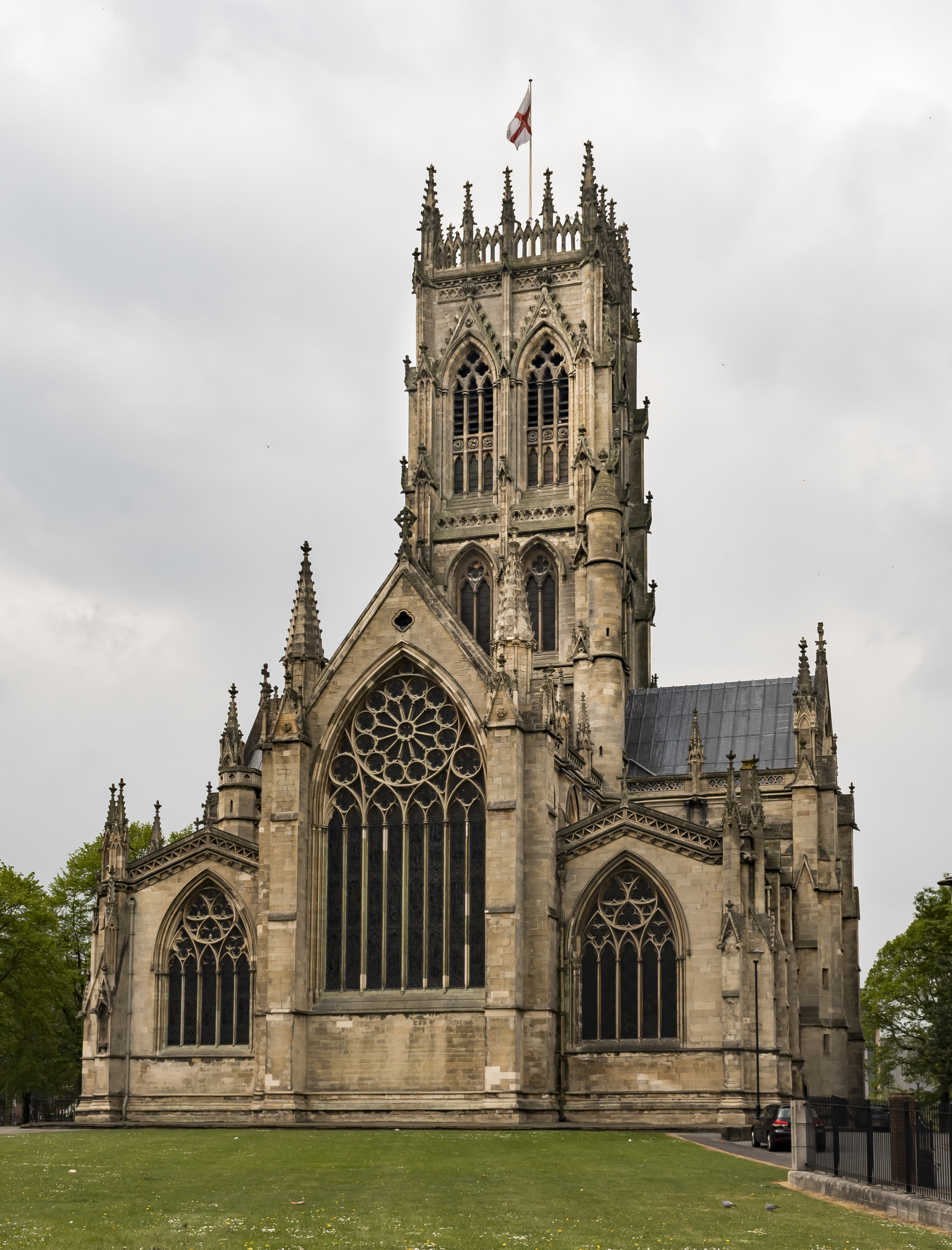
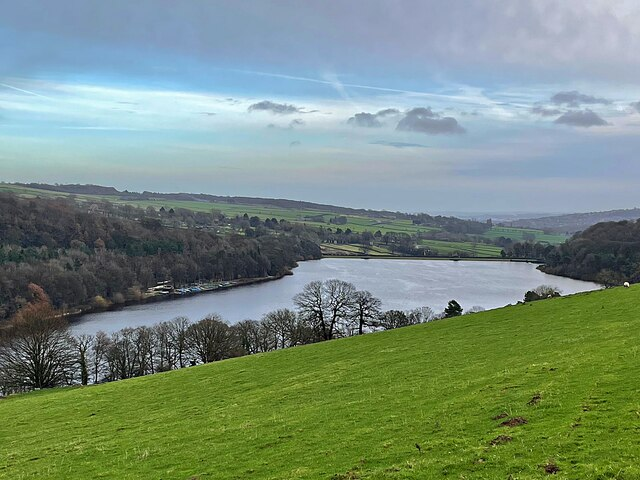
- Clockwise from top: Sheffield skyline, Damflask Reservoir in the Peak District near Low Bradfield, and Doncaster Minster

- Coordinates: 53°30′N 1°20′W
- Sovereign state: United Kingdom
- Constituent country: England
- Region: Yorkshire and the Humber
- Established: 1 April 1974
- Established by: Local Government Act 1972
- Time zone: UTC+0 (GMT)
  - Summer (DST): UTC+1 (BST)
- UK Parliament: List of MPs
- Police: South Yorkshire Police
- Ceremonial county
- Lord Lieutenant: Andrew Coombe
- High Sheriff: Sughra Begum
- Area: 1,552 km^{2} (599 sq mi)
  - Rank: 38th of 48
- Population (2024): 1,430,623
  - Rank: 10th of 48
  - Density: 922/km^{2} (2,390/sq mi)
- Metropolitan county
- Government: South Yorkshire Mayoral Combined Authority
- Mayor: Oliver Coppard (L)
- Admin HQ: Sheffield
- GSS code: E11000003 (county); E47000002 (city region)
- ITL: TLE3
- Website: southyorkshire-ca.gov.uk
- Districts
- Districts of South Yorkshire; Metropolitan districts
- Districts: 1. Sheffield; 2. Rotherham; 3. Doncaster; 4. Barnsley

South Yorkshire is a ceremonial county in the Yorkshire and the Humber region of Northern England. It borders North Yorkshire and West Yorkshire to the north, the East Riding of Yorkshire to the north-east, Lincolnshire to the east, Nottinghamshire to the south-east, and Derbyshire to the south and west. The largest settlement is the city of Sheffield.

The county is largely urban, with an area of 1,552 km^{2} (599 sq mi) and an estimated population of 1,430,623 in 2024. Sheffield is in the south of the county, and Rotherham immediately to the north-east. The city of Doncaster is in the east, and Barnsley in the north. The far east and the west of the county are predominantly rural. For local government purposes the county comprises four metropolitan boroughs: Barnsley, Doncaster, Rotherham, and Sheffield. They collaborate through the South Yorkshire Mayoral Combined Authority. The county was created in 1974 from the southern part of the West Riding of Yorkshire and a small part of northern Nottinghamshire.

The west of South Yorkshire contains part of the Peak District, an upland area and national park that is part of the Pennines. The hills are the source of the River Don, which flows east through Sheffield, Rotherham, and Doncaster. The South Yorkshire coalfield underlies Barnsley, Doncaster, and part of Sheffield, and its exploitation contributed to the development of their industry. The area between Rotherham and Doncaster is rolling arable farmland underlain by limestone, and beyond in the east of the county are the flat Humberhead Levels.

== History ==
While the county of South Yorkshire was created in 1974, the history of its constituent settlements and parts goes back centuries. Prehistoric remains include a Mesolithic "house" (a circle of stones in the shape of a hut-base) dating to around 8000 BC, found at Deepcar, in the northern part of Sheffield. Evidence of even earlier inhabitation in the wider region exists about 3 miles (5 km) over the county boundary at Creswell Crags in Derbyshire, where artefacts and rock art found in caves have been dated by archaeologists to the late Upper Palaeolithic period, at least 12,800 years ago. The region was on the frontier of the Roman Empire during the Roman period.

The main settlements of South Yorkshire grew up around the industries of mining and steel manufacturing. The main mining industry was coal which was concentrated to the north and east of the county. There were also iron deposits which were mined in the area. The rivers running off the Pennines to the west of the county supported the steel industry that is concentrated in Sheffield, Stocksbridge and Rotherham. The proximity of the iron and coal also made this an ideal place for steel manufacture.

Although Christian nonconformism was never as strong in South Yorkshire as in the mill towns of West Yorkshire, there are still many Methodist and Baptist churches in the area. Today, South Yorkshire has a relatively high number of followers of spiritualism. It is the only county that counts as a full region in the Spiritualists' National Union.

=== Redcliffe-Maud Report ===
The Local Government Commission for England presented draft recommendations, in December 1965, proposing a new county—York and North Midlands—roughly centred on the southern part of the West Riding of Yorkshire and northern parts of Derbyshire and Nottinghamshire. The review was abolished in favour of the Royal Commission on Local Government before it was able to issue a final report.

The Royal Commission's 1969 report, known as the Redcliffe-Maud Report, proposed the removal of much of the then existing system of local government. The commission described the system of administering urban and rural districts separately as outdated, noting that urban areas provided employment and services for rural dwellers, and open countryside was used by town dwellers for recreation.

Redcliffe-Maud's recommendations were accepted by the Labour government in February 1970. Although the Redcliffe-Maud Report was rejected by the Conservative government after the 1970 general election, there was a commitment to local government reform, and the idea of a metropolitan county of South Yorkshire.

| post-1974 | | pre-1974 | | | |
| Metropolitan county | Metropolitan borough | County boroughs | Non-county boroughs | Urban districts | Rural districts |
|---|---|---|---|---|---|
| South Yorkshire is an amalgamation of 32 former local government districts, including four county boroughs. | Barnsley | Barnsley | – | Cudworth • Darfield • Darton • Dearne • Dodworth • Hoyland Nether • Penistone • Royston • Wombwell • Worsbrough | Hemsworth • Penistone • Wortley (part) |
| South Yorkshire is an amalgamation of 32 former local government districts, including four county boroughs. | Doncaster | Doncaster | – | Adwick le Street • Bentley with Arksey • Conisbrough • Mexborough • Tickhill | Doncaster • East Retford (part) • Thorne • Worksop (part) |
| South Yorkshire is an amalgamation of 32 former local government districts, including four county boroughs. | Rotherham | Rotherham | – | Maltby • Swinton • Rawmarsh • Wath upon Dearne | Kiveton Park • Rotherham |
| South Yorkshire is an amalgamation of 32 former local government districts, including four county boroughs. | Sheffield | Sheffield | – | Stocksbridge | Wortley (part) |

=== After 1974 ===
The Local Government Act 1972 reformed local government in England by creating a system of two-tier metropolitan and non-metropolitan counties and districts throughout the country.The act formally established South Yorkshire on 1 April 1974, although South Yorkshire County Council (SYCC) had been running since elections in 1973. The leading article in The Times on the day the Local Government Act came into effect noted that the "new arrangement is a compromise which seeks to reconcile familiar geography which commands a certain amount of affection and loyalty, with the scale of operations on which modern planning methods can work effectively".

South Yorkshire initially had a two tier structure of local government with a strategic-level county council and four districts providing most services.

In 1974, as part of the South Yorkshire Structure Plan of the environment, conservation and land use, South Yorkshire County Council commissioned a public attitudes survey covering job opportunities, educational facilities, leisure opportunities, health and medical services, shopping centres and transport in the county.

In 1986, throughout England the metropolitan county councils were abolished. The functions of the county council were devolved to the boroughs; joint-boards covering fire, police and public transport; and to other special joint arrangements. The joint boards continue to function and include the South Yorkshire Passenger Transport Executive. The South Yorkshire Police and Crime Commissioner also oversees South Yorkshire Police.

Although the county council was abolished, South Yorkshire remains a metropolitan and ceremonial county with a Lord Lieutenant of South Yorkshire and a High Sheriff.

South Yorkshire lies within the Sheffield City Region with Barnsley also being within the Leeds City Region, reflecting its geographical position midway between Yorkshire's two largest cities.

== Geography ==
The metropolitan county borders Derbyshire, West Yorkshire, North Yorkshire, the East Riding of Yorkshire, Lincolnshire and Nottinghamshire. The terrain of the county is mostly distinguished by the Pennines and its foothills which rise in the west of the county and gradually descend into the Humberhead Levels in the east of the county. Geologically, the county lies largely on the carboniferous rocks of the Yorkshire coalfield in the outer Pennine fringes, producing a rolling landscape with hills, escarpments and broad valleys. In this landscape, there is widespread evidence of both current and former industrial activity. There are numerous mine buildings, former spoil heaps and iron and steel plants. The scenery is a mixture of built up areas, industrial land with some dereliction, and farmed open country. Ribbon developments along transport routes including canal, road and rail are prominent features of the area although some remnants of the pre industrial landscape and semi-natural vegetation still survive.

The Pennines in the west of the county are mostly inside the Peak District National Park and also contain carboniferous rocks, with the underlying geology primarily being millstone grit sandstones of the Dark Peak rising from the Yorkshire coalfield and the terrain is mostly moorland plateaus and gritstone edges. The inner Pennine fringes between the Dark Peak and Yorkshire coalfield are distinguished by many steep valleys, and a transition from uplands and rural landscape to lowlands and urban landscape towards the east of the county. Major rivers which cross the area are the Dearne, Rother and Don. To the east, in the Doncaster area the landscape becomes flatter as the eastward dipping carboniferous rocks of the coalfield are overlain by the lacustrine deposits of the Humberhead Levels.

=== Green belt ===
South Yorkshire contains green belt throughout the county, surrounding its four districts to large extents. It was first drawn up from the 1950s. The western edge of the Sheffield and Barnsley districts directly form with the boundary of the Peak District National Park.

== Settlements ==
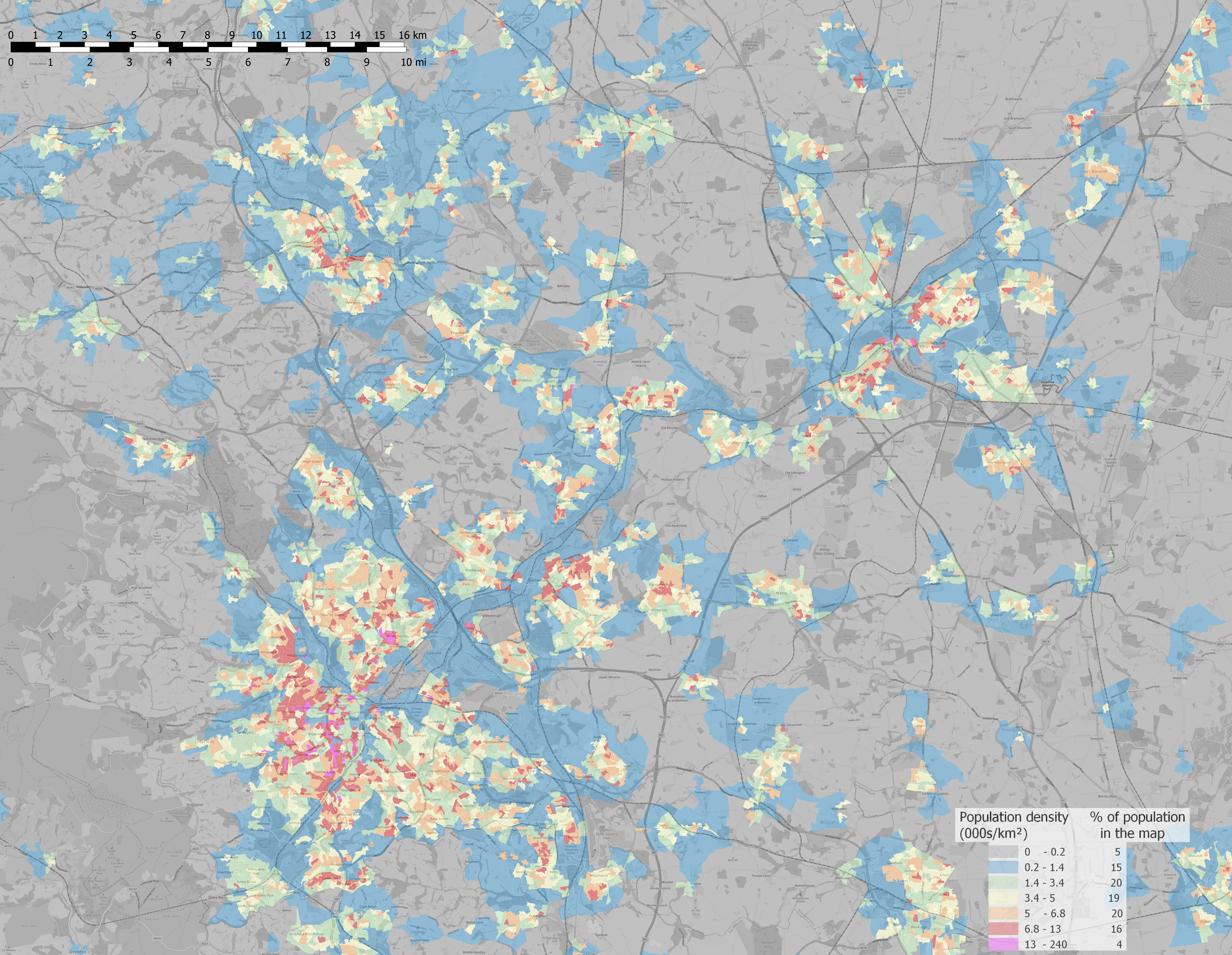
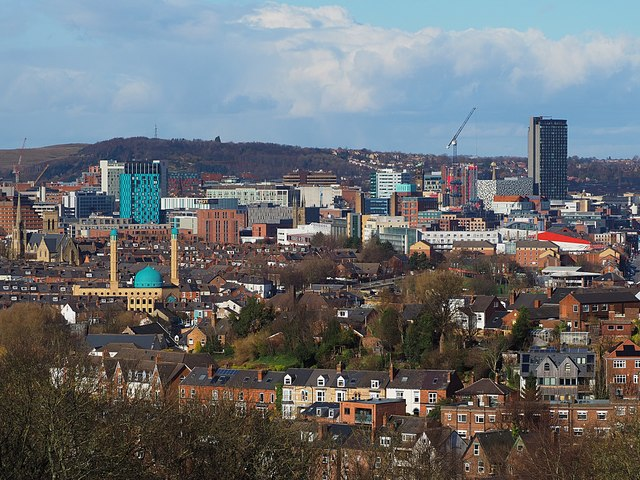
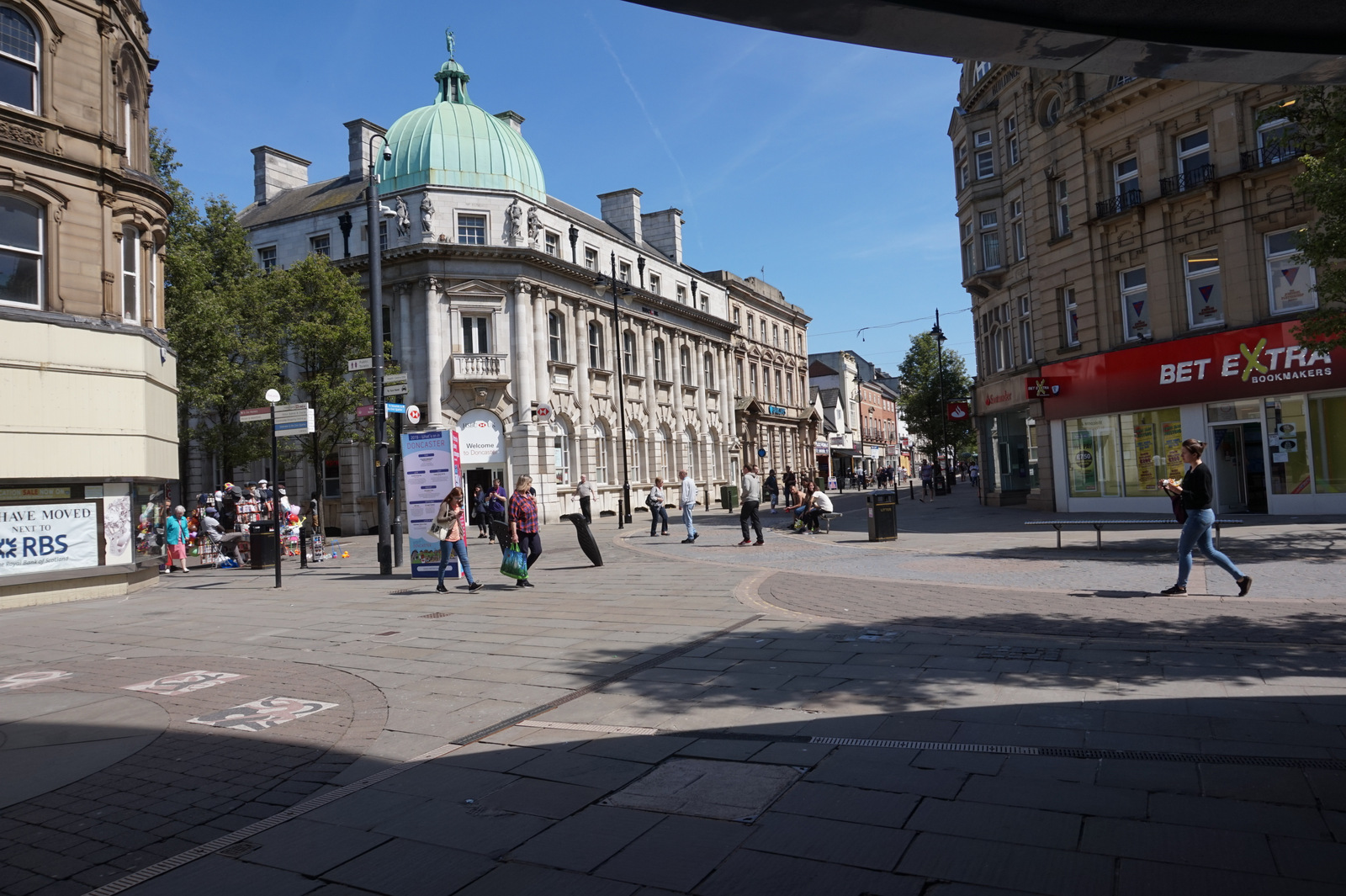
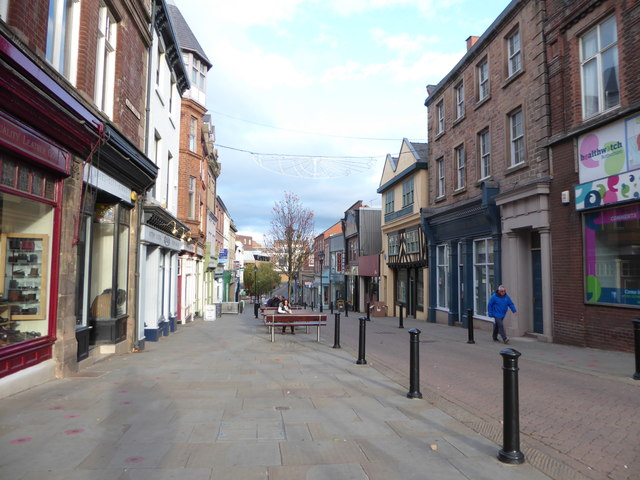
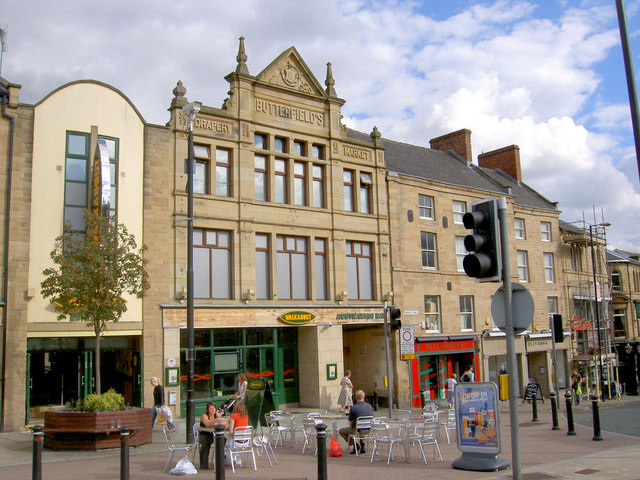
Population density map, Sheffield, Doncaster, Rotherham and Barnsley

The table below outlines many of the county's settlements, and is formatted according to their metropolitan borough.

| Metropolitan county | Metropolitan borough | Centre of administration | Other places |
|---|---|---|---|
| South Yorkshire | Barnsley (borough) | Barnsley (town) | Billingley, Birdwell, Bolton-upon-Dearne, Cudworth, Darfield, Darton, Dodworth, Goldthorpe, Great Houghton, Grimethorpe, Hoyland Nether, Royston, Penistone, Thurnscoe, Wombwell, Worsbrough |
| South Yorkshire | City of Doncaster | Doncaster (city) | Adwick le Street, Armthorpe, Askern, Auckley, Balby, Barnby Dun, Bawtry, Bentley, Bessacarr, Braithwell, Branton, Cantley, Carcroft, Conisbrough, Cusworth Denaby, Dunscroft, Dunsville, Edenthorpe, Edlington, Finningley, Fishlake, Hatfield, Hyde Park, Intake, Kirk Sandall, Loversall, Marr, Mexborough, Micklebring, Moorends, Scawsby, Scawthorpe, Skellow, Stainforth, Rossington, Sykehouse, Norton, Thorne, Tickhill, Wadworth, Warmsworth, Wheatley, Wheatley Hills |
| South Yorkshire | Rotherham (borough) | Rotherham (town) | Anston, Aughton, Brinsworth, Dinnington, Harthill, Kiveton Park, Maltby, Rawmarsh, Scholes, Swinton, Thorpe Hesley, Todwick, Treeton, Thurcroft, Wales, Wath-upon-Dearne, Woodsetts, Whiston |
| South Yorkshire | City of Sheffield | Sheffield City Centre | Beighton, Chapeltown, Highlane, Mosborough, Oughtibridge, Stocksbridge, Wharncliffe Side |

Of these settlements above, South Yorkshire has three main urban areas: the Dearne Valley which covers Barnsley and surrounding area; the Sheffield urban area which covers Sheffield, Rotherham and surrounding area; and the Doncaster urban area which covers Doncaster and surrounding area.

== Governance ==
The coat of arms of the former South Yorkshire County Council.

| Body | Headquarters | Notes |
|---|---|---|
| South Yorkshire Mayoral Combined Authority | Castlegate Quarter, Sheffield City Centre | Formerly Sheffield City Region Combined Authority, includes South Yorkshire Passenger Transport Executive |
| South Yorkshire County Council | Central Offices, Barnsley | Abolished in 1986 |
| South Yorkshire Joint Secretariat | Barnsley | The only metropolitan county in the UK that has established a formal joint secretariat. |
| South Yorkshire Fire and Rescue Service | Cultural Industries Quarter, Sheffield City Centre | |
| South Yorkshire Police | Carbrook, Sheffield | |
| Barnsley Metropolitan Borough Council | Barnsley Town Hall | Covers Metropolitan Borough of Barnsley |
| Doncaster Council | Doncaster Civic Office | Covers City of Doncaster district |
| Rotherham Metropolitan Borough Council | Rotherham Town Hall | Covers Metropolitan Borough of Rotherham |
| Sheffield City Council | Sheffield Town Hall | Covers City of Sheffield district |

The South Yorkshire County Council was abolished and its districts effectively became unitary authorities; they are the City of Sheffield, the City of Doncaster, the Metropolitan Borough of Barnsley and the Metropolitan Borough of Rotherham.

In 1986, throughout England the metropolitan county councils were abolished. The ceremonial county with a Lord Lieutenant of South Yorkshire and a High Sheriff was retained. The county remains defined as metropolitan, functions of the county council devolved to the boroughs with many functions administered by joint authorities (such a passenger transport executive) containing representatives of the four councils.

The South Yorkshire Mayoral Combined Authority was established in 2014 to bring the leaders of the four councils to give the county a main statutory body. It is led by the directly elected Mayor of South Yorkshire.

In the 2016 referendum on the United Kingdom's membership of the European Union, South Yorkshire voted 62% leave and 38% remain, making it one of the most heavily Leave areas in the country.

== Demography ==
| Ethnic Group | Years | | | | | | | | | |
| Ethnic Group | 1971 estimations | | 1981 estimations | | 1991 census | | 2001 census | | 2021 census | |
| Ethnic Group | Number | % | Number | % | Number | % | Number | % | Number | % |
| White: Total | – | 98.9% | 1,291,660 | 98.1% | 1,263,799 | 97.1% | 1,204,988 | 95.1% | 1,206,059 | 87.7% |
|---|---|---|---|---|---|---|---|---|---|---|
| White: British | – | – | – | – | – | – | 1,186,605 | 93.7% | 1,142,678 | 83.1% |
| White: Irish | – | – | – | – | – | – | 6,655 | 0.5% | 4,930 | 0.4% |
| White: Gypsy or Irish Traveller | – | – | – | – | – | – | – | – | 1,653 | 0.1% |
| White: Roma | – | – | – | – | – | – | – | – | 4,156 | 0.3% |
| White: Other | – | – | – | – | – | – | 11,728 | 0.9% | 52,642 | 3.8% |
| Asian or Asian British: Total | – | – | 14,423 | 1.1% | 22,559 | 1.7% | 35,933 | 3% | 79,119 | 5.7% |
| Asian or Asian British: Indian | – | – | 2,444 | | 3,645 | | 5,186 | 0.4% | 10,893 | 0.8% |
| Asian or Asian British: Pakistani | – | – | 9,174 | | 14,017 | 1.1% | 22,187 | 1.8% | 41,190 | 3.0% |
| Asian or Asian British: Bangladeshi | – | – | 675 | | 1249 | | 2,025 | 0.2% | 4,610 | 0.3% |
| Asian or Asian British: Chinese | – | – | 1376 | | 2241 | | 3,273 | 0.3% | 9,722 | 0.7% |
| Asian or Asian British: Other Asian | – | – | 754 | | 1407 | | 3,262 | 0.3% | 12,704 | 0.9% |
| Black or Black British: Total | – | – | 7,772 | | 10,517 | | 10,755 | 0.9% | 33,985 | 2.5% |
| Black or Black British: African | – | – | 968 | | 1,414 | | 3,770 | 0.3% | 24,335 | 1.8% |
| Black or Black British: Caribbean | – | – | 4,851 | | 6,365 | | 6,156 | 0.5% | 5,818 | 0.4% |
| Black or Black British: Other Black | – | – | 1,953 | | 2,738 | | 829 | 0.1% | 3,832 | 0.3% |
| Mixed: Total | – | – | – | – | – | – | 11,953 | 1% | 30,454 | 2.2% |
| Mixed: White and Black Caribbean | – | – | – | – | – | – | 5,162 | 0.4% | 11,266 | 0.8% |
| Mixed: White and Black African | – | – | – | – | – | – | 1,102 | 0.1% | 4,124 | 0.3% |
| Mixed: White and Asian | – | – | – | – | – | – | 3,253 | 0.3% | 8,316 | 0.6% |
| Mixed: Other Mixed | – | – | – | – | – | – | 2,436 | 0.2% | 6,748 | 0.5% |
| Other: Total | – | – | 3,345 | | 5,026 | | 2,709 | 0.2% | 25,388 | 1.9% |
| Other: Arab | – | – | – | – | – | – | 2,709 | 0.2% | 10,373 | 0.8% |
| Other: Any other ethnic group | – | – | – | – | – | – | – | – | 15,015 | 1.1% |
| Non-White: Total | – | 1.1% | 25,541 | 1.9% | 38,101 | 2.9% | 61,350 | 4.9% | 168,946 | 12.3% |
| Total | – | 100% | 1,317,201 | 100% | 1,301,900 | 100% | 1,266,338 | 100% | 1,375,005 | 100% |

== Economy ==
As one of the least prosperous areas in Western Europe, South Yorkshire has been targeted for funding from the European Regional Development Fund. This is a chart of trend of regional gross value added of South Yorkshire at current basic prices with figures in millions of British Pounds Sterling.

However, the county has experienced a recent growth in the services sector. In the FDI European Cities and Regions of the Future 2022/23 Awards, Doncaster was ranked the best small city in Europe for investment.

| Year | Regional Gross Value Added |
|---|---|
| 1998 | £12,820 |
| 2001 | £13,921 |
| 2004 | £17,718 |
| 2007 | £21,192 |
| 2010 | £21,512 |
| 2013 | £22,560 |

== Places of interest ==
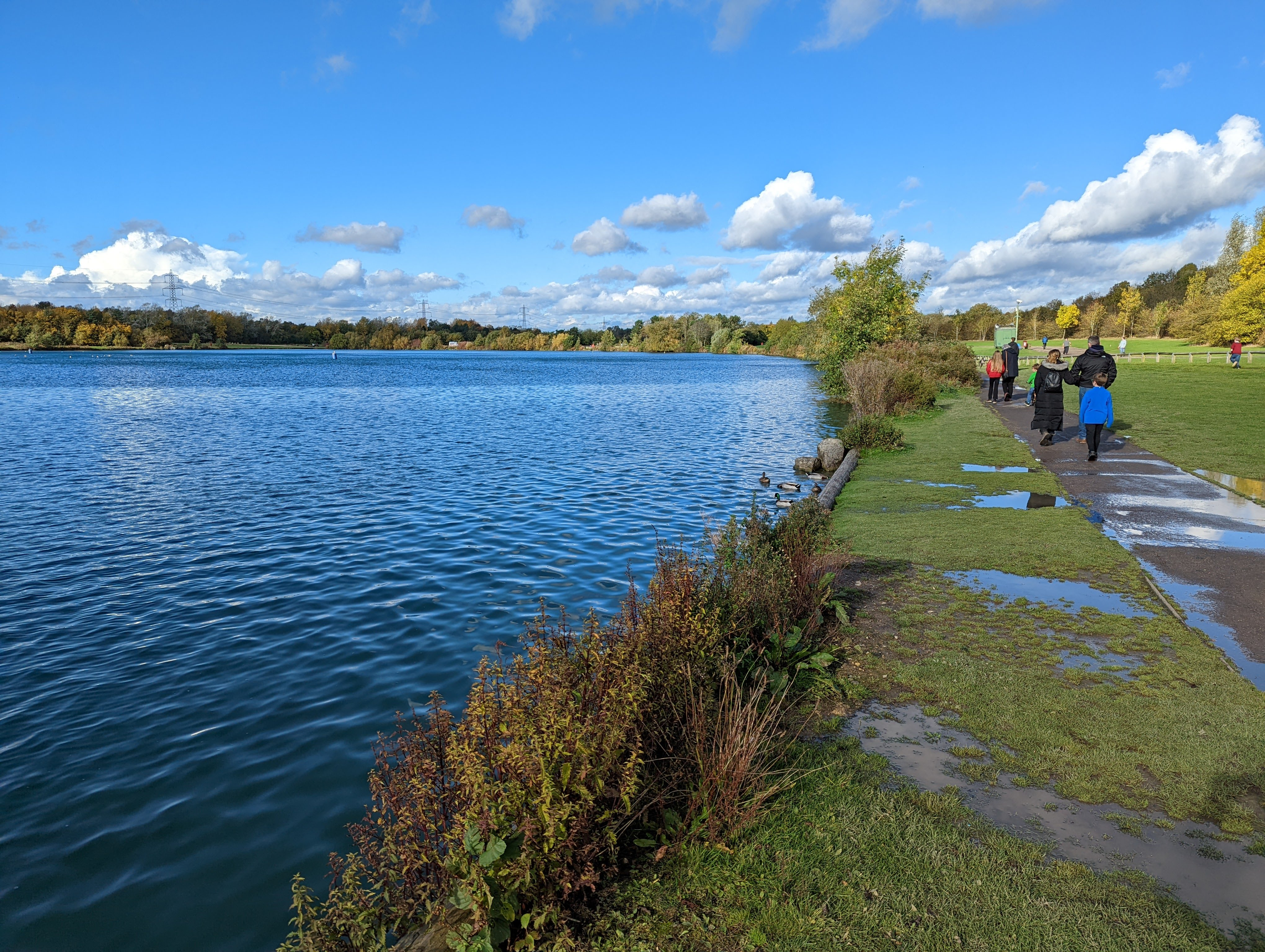
Rother Valley Country Park

Key
| | Abbey/Priory/Cathedral |
| Accessible open space | Accessible open space |
| | Amusement/Theme Park |
| | Castle |
| Country Park | Country Park |
| | English Heritage |
| | Forestry Commission |
| Heritage railway | Heritage railway |
| Historic house | Historic House |
| Places of Worship | Places of Worship |
| Museum (free) Museum | Museum (free/not free) |
| National Trust | National Trust |
| | Theatre |
| | Zoo |

- Abbeydale Industrial Hamlet, Sheffield
- Brodsworth Hall and Gardens
- Cannon Hall Museum, Park & Gardens, Barnsley
- Chapel of Our Lady of Rotherham Bridge ("Chapel on the Bridge"), Rotherham
- Clifton Park Museum, Rotherham
- Conisbrough Castle
- Cusworth Hall
- Doncaster Minster
- Doncaster Mansion House
- Elsecar Steam Railway
- Howden Moors
- Kelham Island Museum, Sheffield
- Magna Science Adventure Centre
- Meadowhall Centre, Sheffield
- Monk Bretton Priory
- Pot House Hamlet
- Sheffield Winter Gardens
- Roche Abbey
- Rotherham Minster
- Rother Valley Country Park
- RSPB Old Moor Wetland Centre
- Sheffield Cathedral
- Ulley Reservoir & Country park
- Wentworth Castle & Gardens, Barnsley
- Wentworth Woodhouse
- Weston Park Museum & Mappin Art Gallery, Sheffield
- Woodlands model village
- Worsborough Mill and Country Park
- Wortley Top Forge
- Yorkshire Wildlife Park
