= Barbara Wilding =

British senior police officer

Chief Constable Barbara Wilding CBE QPM
- Born: Barbara Rees Wilding; June 1950 (age 76)
- Occupation: Chief Constable (Retired)
- Employer: South Wales Police
- Predecessor: Sir Anthony Burden
- Successor: Peter Vaughan

Barbara Rees Wilding, CBE, QPM (born June 1950) is a British retired senior police officer. She served as Chief Constable of South Wales Police, the first woman to hold the post.

Wilding began her career as a cadet in Jersey Police in 1967 and was appointed constable in 1970. The following year she transferred to the Metropolitan Police where she served as an operational detective at New Scotland Yard. Wilding was involved in the identification of victims from the sinking of the pleasure cruiser Marchioness on the River Thames in 1989.

She became an Assistant Chief Constable in Kent Constabulary in 1994. In 1998, she returned to the Metropolitan Police as Deputy Assistant Commissioner, and served as Director of Strategic Resources and also Specialist Operations, where she commanded the Security and Protection Directorate which included protection of Ministers, Royal Family, Special Branch, Heathrow Airport, covert intelligence and the specialist firearms unit.

Wilding was appointed Chief Constable of South Wales Police on 1 January 2004. She was appointed Commander of the Order of the British Empire (CBE) in the 2006 Birthday Honours.

She retired at the end of December 2009 as Britain's longest-serving female chief constable and was succeeded by Peter Vaughan. In 2011 she was appointed High Sheriff of Mid Glamorgan.

Between 2015 and 2021, Wilding was the Chancellor of Cardiff Metropolitan University, prior to which she served as the Chair of the University's Board of Governors.

Wilding is married and has two daughters, one of whom is an officer in South Wales Police. She read criminology at the London School of Economics.

== Honours ==

| Ribbon | Description | Notes |
| | Order of the British Empire (CBE) | 2006 |
| | Queen's Police Medal (QPM) | |
| | Queen Elizabeth II Golden Jubilee Medal | |
| | Police Long Service and Good Conduct Medal | |

Police appointments
| Preceded by Sir Anthony Burden | Chief Constable of South Wales Police; 2004 - 2009 | Succeeded by Peter Vaughan |
