= Kathrin Thomas =

Lord-Lieutenant (1944–2023)

Dame Kathrin Elizabeth Thomas, DCVO, JP (20 May 1944 – 14 February 2023) was Lord Lieutenant of Mid Glamorgan from 2003 to 2019. She had previously served as High Sheriff, Deputy Lieutenant and Vice Lord-Lieutenant of Mid Glamorgan.

Thomas was appointed Commander of the Royal Victorian Order (CVO) in the 2002 New Year Honours, and advanced to Dame Commander of the Royal Victorian Order (DCVO) in the 2018 New Year Honours.

She died on 14 February 2023, at the age of 78.

Honorary titles
Preceded by Murray Adams McLaggan	Lord Lieutenant of Mid Glamorgan; 2003–2019	Succeeded by Peter Vaughan
