= 1981 South Yorkshire County Council election =

1981 UK local government election

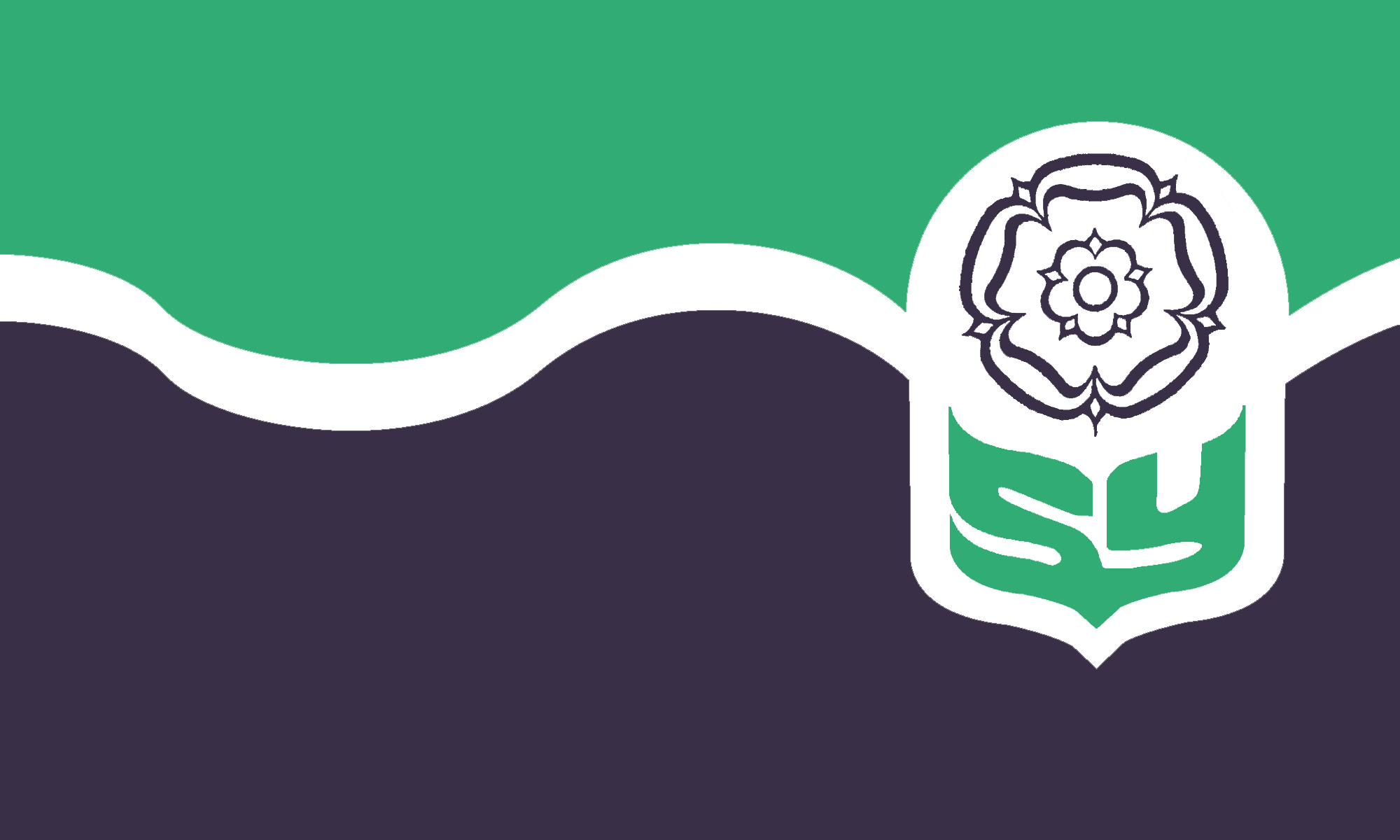
← 1977	7 May 1981	Abolished →

All 100 seats to South Yorkshire County Council 51 seats needed for a majority
	First party	Second party	Third party
Party	Labour	Conservative	Liberal
Seats won	82	14	3
Seat change	▲20	▼17	▲1
Percentage	58.8%	23.1%	13.3%
Swing	▲13.9%	▼16.6%	▲7.1%
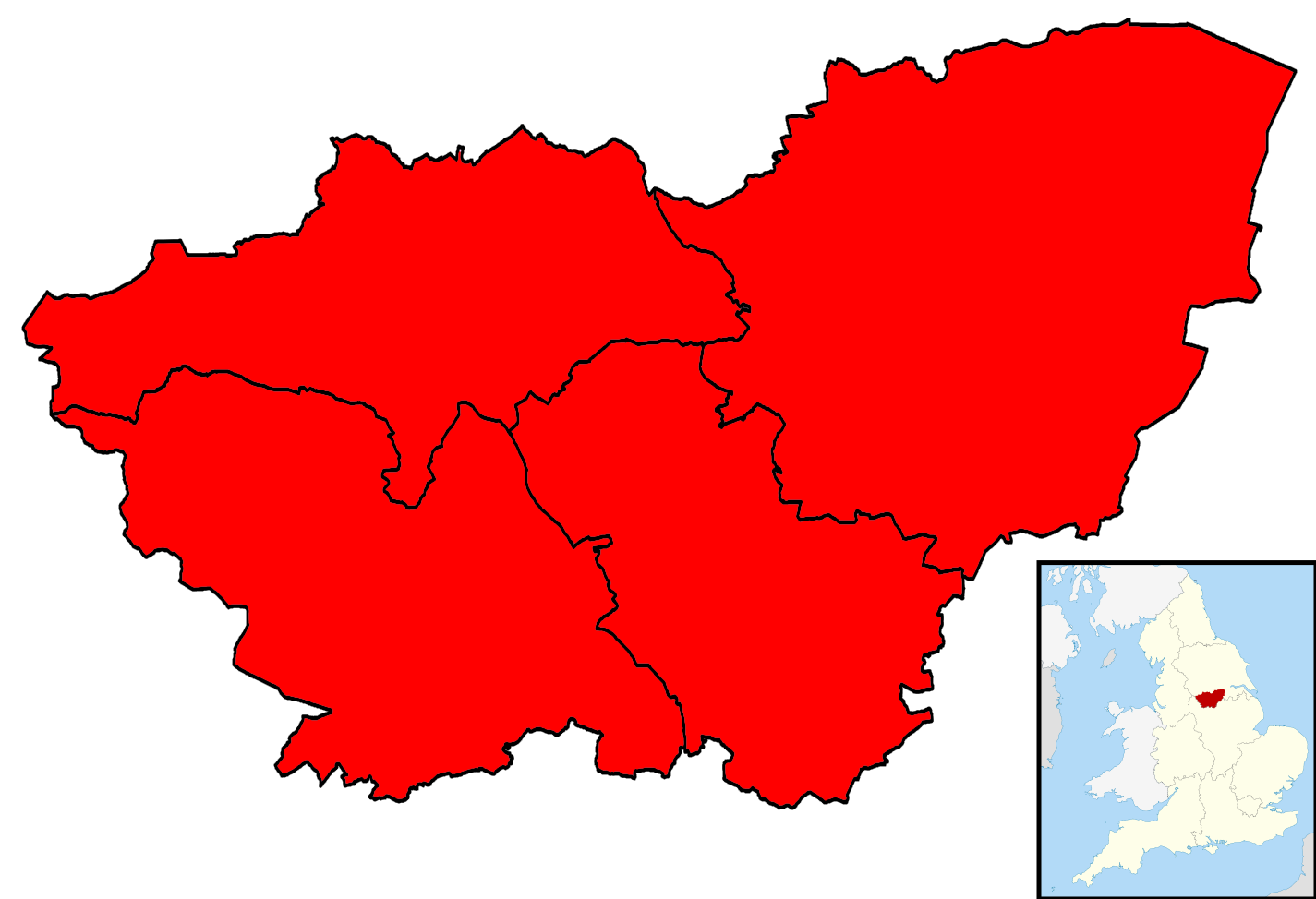
- Election results by metropolitan borough.
Council control before election
Labour
Council control after election
Labour

Elections to South Yorkshire County Council, a metropolitan county council of Yorkshire in England, were held on 7 May 1981, resulting in a council with Labour members forming a majority.

This was the last election to the South Yorkshire county council, as metropolitan county councils were abolished in 1986.

== Results ==
South Yorkshire County Council election, 1981
Party	Seats	Gains	Losses	Net gain/loss	Seats %	Votes %	Votes	+/−
Labour	82					58.8		▲13.9
Conservative	14					23.1		▼16.6
Liberal	3					13.3		▲7.1
Green	0				0.0	0.1		▲0.1
Independent	0				0.0	0.5		▼0.7
Other parties	1					4.2		▼3.8
