= Norman Lloyd-Edwards =

British politician (born 1933)

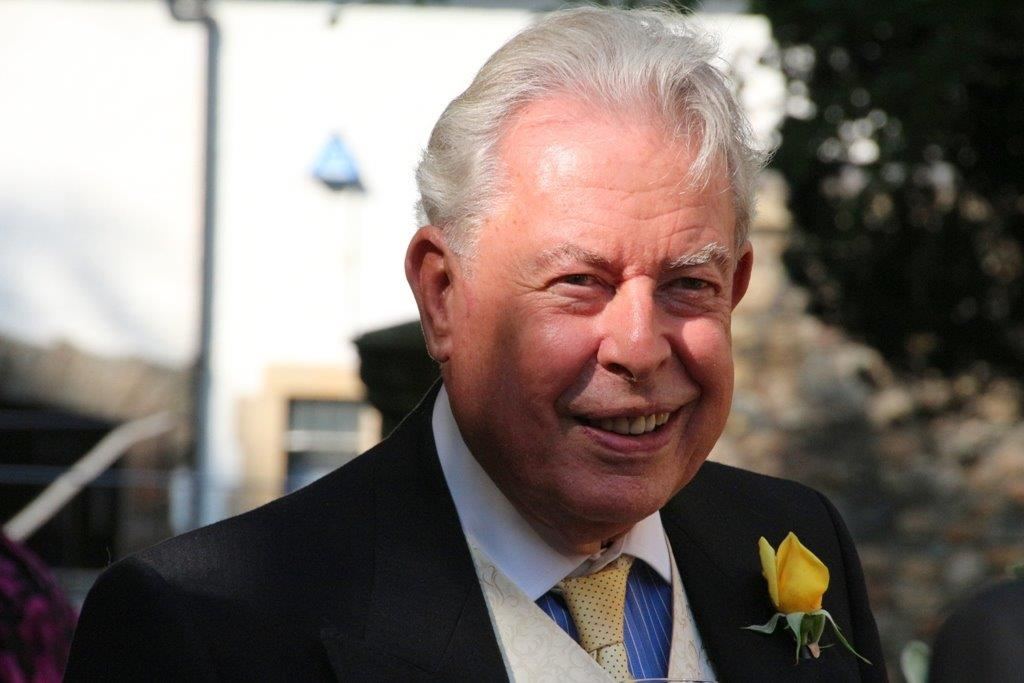
Captain Sir Norman Lloyd-Edwards

Sir Norman Lloyd-Edwards KCVO GCStJ RD JP RNR (born 13 June 1933) served as the Lord Lieutenant of South Glamorgan from 1990 to 2008.

== Early life ==
Lloyd-Edwards comes from Aberfan, Merthyr Tydfil, and was educated at Monmouth School for Boys, Quakers Yard Grammar School and the University of Bristol.

== Career ==
A solicitor and notary public, was a senior partner and consultant with Cartwrights, Adams & Black in Cardiff. He was president of Cardiff Law Society from 1995 to 1996.

Joining RNVR in 1952, he spent his National Service in the Royal Navy from 1958 to 1960. Following this, he joined the South Wales Division of the Royal Naval Reserve. He was awarded Reserve Decoration in 1971 and Bar in 1980, he was appointed commanding officer of HMS Cambria, South Wales Division RNR, in 1981 and promoted to captain in 1982. He retired in 1986. He was appointed naval ADC to HM The Queen Elizabeth II in 1984.

Lloyd-Edwards was honorary colonel of Second Battalion Royal Regiment of Wales (TA) 1995–1999; honorary colonel of the newly formed Royal Welsh Regiment, 1999–2003; honorary colonel 160 (Wales) Brigade 2007–11; now honorary colonel of 53 (Wales & Western) Squadron, Royal Corps of Signals. Having previously been chairman of Glamorgan TAVRA, he was president of RFCA Wales 1999–2005 and president No. 1 Welsh Wing, Air Training Corps.

He served on Cardiff City Council between 1963 and 1987, and was Deputy Lord Mayor in 1972–73. Sir Norman was Lord Mayor in 1985–86. He contested Rhondda West in 1964 and Cardiff South East in 1966 and 1970 as Conservative Candidate.

== Offices/Affiliations ==
In 1978, Lloyd-Edwards was appointed Deputy Lieutenant for South Glamorgan, in 1986 Vice Lord Lieutenant, and, in August 1990, Lord Lieutenant.

- Chief Magistrate of the County of South Glamorgan. On 8 June 2008, it was announced that Lloyd-Edwards would retire from the post of Lord Lieutenant of South Glamorgan on his 75th birthday.
- President of the Pilot cutter seamark charitable trust, an organisation restoring Swansea's pilot ship first commissioned in 1959.
- Vice President of the Royal Welsh College of Music and Drama since May 1995.
- Chapter Clerk of Llandaff Cathedral (1975 to 1990); President of the Friends for the Cathedral.

=== Current roles ===
- President, City Hospice (formerly George Thomas Hospice), Community Foundation Wales, RNLI, Royal British Legion (South Wales), Cardiff & Vale Youth Orchestra, Welsh Music Guild, the Duke of Edinburgh's Award (Wales), and the United Services Mess
- Chairman of the National Youth Orchestra of Wales
- Chairman, Welsh Chamber Orchestra
- President, The Insole Court Trust
- President of the local Branches of the National Trust; King George's Fund for Sailors; Tall Ships Youth Trust; and of the Ivor Novello Statue Fund
- Chairman of Wales Committee Duke of Edinburgh's Award 1981–1996
- Governor of the English Speaking Union, 2004–2010
- President of South Glamorgan Scouts
- Patron of the Wales Festival of Remembrance
- Founder Master of the Worshipful Livery Company of Wales for Arts, Science and Technology, 1991–1995
- Chairman of National Rescue Training Council from 1981 to 1996
- Chairman of Gwerin (Royal British Legion) Housing Assoc. 1991–1996
- Chairman of Cardiff Festival of Music
- Member of the Welsh Arts Council and the BBC Council for Wales
- Patron of Cardiff Bay Yacht Club

He was awarded the General Service Medal with Northern Ireland Clasp, Queen Elizabeth II Golden Jubilee Medal, Reserve Decoration with 1 Clasp (RD), Service Medal of the Order of St John with 3 Silver Clasps, and Queen Elizabeth II Diamond Jubilee Medal.

== Freemasonry ==
Lloyd-Edwards had a career in English Freemasonry (the United Grand Lodge of England is also responsible for Freemasonry in Wales). He has served many years as President of the Masonic Samaritan Fund (a national Masonic health care charity), and in April 2008 it was announced that he would be the new Provincial Grand Master for the Masonic Province of South Wales (Eastern Division), retiring in 2013.

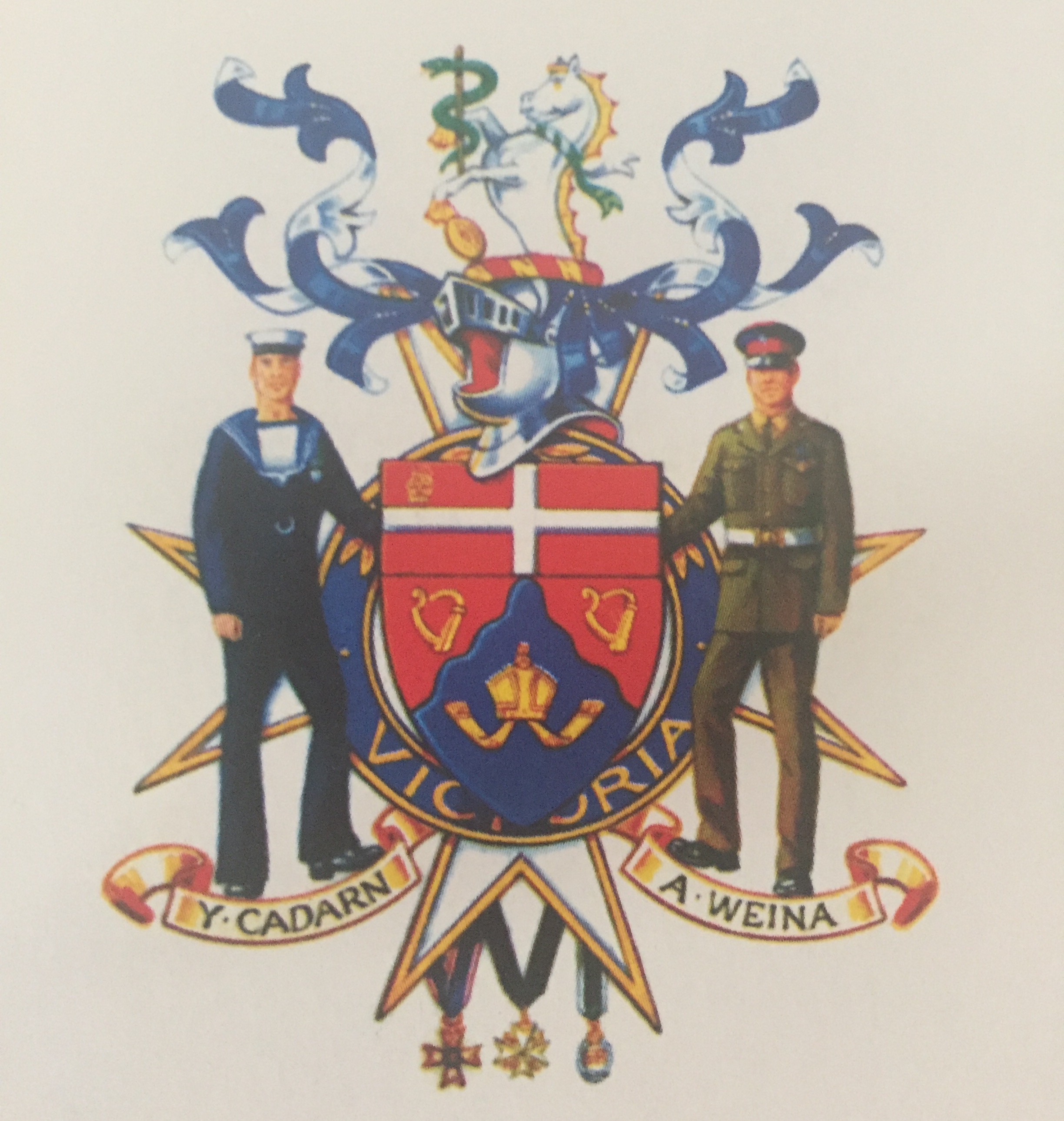
Captain Sir Norman Lloyd-Edwards coat of arms

== Honours ==
He was made a Knight Commander of the Royal Victorian Order (KCVO) in 2007. In 1983, Lloyd-Edwards was appointed an Officer of the Venerable Order of St John (OStJ), subsequently made Knight of the same Order (KStJ) in 1988, and in 1996 promoted to the highest grade of the Order, namely Bailiff Grand Cross (GCStJ). He served as Prior of the Priory of Wales from 1989 to 2005, and the Deputy Lord Prior of the Order of St John from 2005 to 2011 as one of the Great Officers governing the organisation worldwide.

Lloyd-Edwards is also a Grand Officer of Merit in the Companionate of Merit of the Military & Hospitaller Military & Hospitaller Order of St Lazarus of Jerusalem.

Lloyd-Edwards was appointed a Fellow of University of Wales Cardiff Institute (now Cardiff Metropolitan University) in 1995 and the Royal Welsh College of Music and Drama in 2002. He was awarded an Hon Doctorate by the University of Glamorgan (now University of South Wales) in 2008 and Hon LL.D by the University of Wales in 2008.

Ribbon	Description	Notes
	Royal Victorian Order (KCVO)	2007; Knight Commander
	Order of St John (GCStJ)	1996; Bailiff Grand Cross
	General Service Medal	With "NORTHERN IRELAND" Clasp
	Queen Elizabeth II Golden Jubilee Medal	2002; UK version of this medal
	Queen Elizabeth II Diamond Jubilee Medal	2012; UK version of this medal
	Decoration for Officers of the Royal Naval Reserve (RD)	15 years service in the Royal Naval Reserve.; With 1 Clasp
	Service Medal of the Order of St John	With 3 Silver Bars

== Offices held ==
Honorary titles
Preceded by Susan Eva Williams	Lord Lieutenant of South Glamorgan; 1990–2008	Succeeded by Peter Beck
