= Central Offices, Barnsley =

County building in Barnsley, South Yorkshire, England

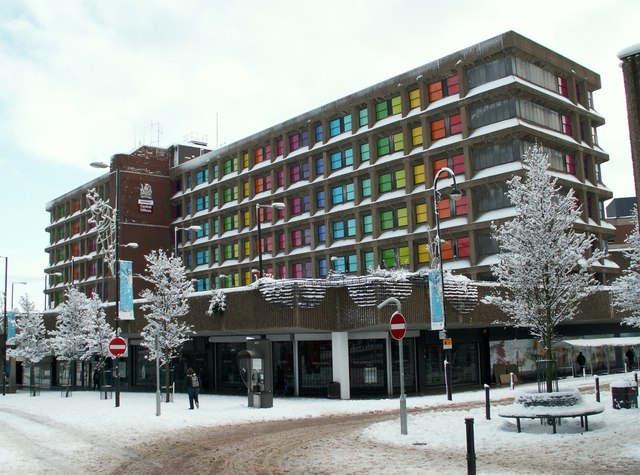
- Central Offices

- Location within South Yorkshire

General information
- Location: Kendray Street, Barnsley, United Kingdom
- Coordinates: 53.5530°N 1.4787°W
- Completed: 1973 and 1974
- Demolished: 2015

Central Offices was a municipal facility at Kendray Street in Barnsley, South Yorkshire, England. As County Hall, it was the headquarters of South Yorkshire County Council.

== History ==
The building, which was designed in the brutalist style, was built with a reinforced concrete frame for Norwich Union on a vacant site just south of the old outdoor markets in the 1960s. The building was built in two phases: phase 1 was completed by 1973 and phase 2 by 1974. The design for the seven-storey building involved continuous bands of glazing with exposed concrete beams above and below: it was leased by South Yorkshire County Council from its formation in 1974 and was subsequently known as County Hall.

During the Cold War era, South Yorkshire County Council declared itself "a nuclear-free zone", although in practice any emergency planning for a nuclear attack would have been linked to the county hall.

Following the abolition of South Yorkshire County Council in 1986, the building was renamed Central Offices and used by the housing, planning and public services departments of Barnsley Metropolitan Borough Council. After being vacated by the Barnsley Council in 2007, the windows were lit up in various colours as a canvas for a large-scale public artwork in 2009.

As part of a regeneration strategy to enhance the town centre, the building was demolished in November 2015 to make way for a temporary home for Barnsley Indoor Markets. Following the opening of the new permanent market hall in the Glass Works in November 2018, Barnsley Council confirmed that the temporary market hall would in turn be dismantled to allow for the opening of a new public square on the old Central Offices site in spring 2021.
