= Nigel Sherlock =

English stockbroker

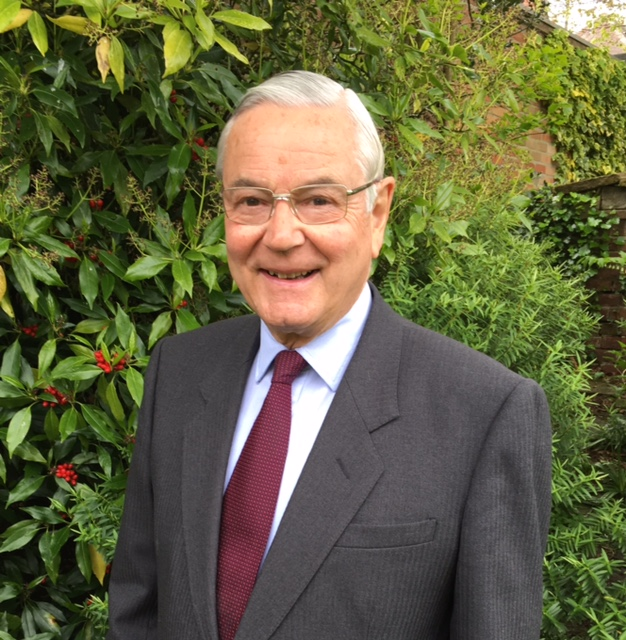

Sir Nigel Sherlock is a retired stockbroker in the North East of England.

== Business ==
After graduating from the University of Nottingham Sherlock spent much of his career in stockbroking and was involved in establishing the Northern Development Company and the Northern Investors Company, which provide financial support for small businesses.

== Public responsibilities ==
Sherlock was Newcastle University's Chairman and Acting Pro-Chancellor from 1993 to 2002. In 2000 he was appointed Lord Lieutenant of Tyne and Wear which led to his involvement with many units of the Reserve Forces and Cadets Association.

== Family and honours ==
He was appointed an Officer of the Order of the British Empire in 2003 and a Knight Commander of the Royal Victorian Order in 2014.

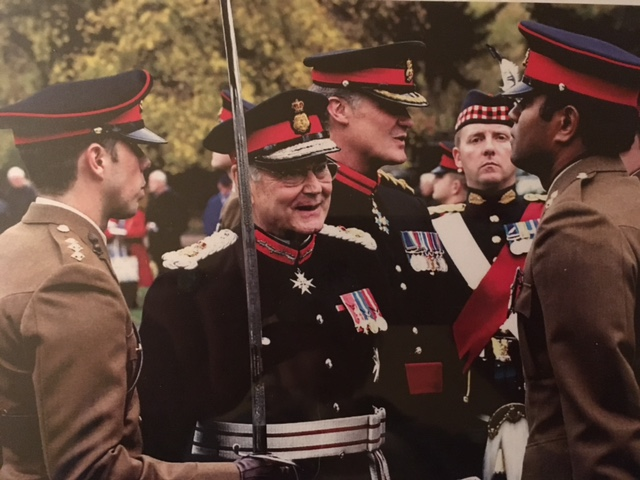
Sir Nigel Sherlock KCVO OBE
