= Custos Rotulorum of Carlow =

The Custos Rotulorum of Carlow was the highest civil officer in County Carlow.

== Incumbents ==
- 1682-1686 Richard Butler, 1st Earl of Arran
- 1801-1816 David Latouche
- 1818->1834 William Browne (died 1840)

For later custodes rotulorum, see Lord Lieutenant of Carlow
