= Custos Rotulorum of Durham =

The custos rotulorum of County Durham was formerly appointed by the Bishop of Durham until the abolition of his palatine rights following the Palatinate of Durham Act, 1836. After that date the office of custos rotulorum was passed to the Lord Lieutenant of Durham.

This is an incomplete list of people who have served as Custos Rotulorum of Durham.

- Thomas Layton 1574
- George Baker 1621
- William Talbot 1722–1730 (Bishop of Durham)
- Edward Chandler 1730–1750 (Bishop of Durham)
- Joseph Butler 1750–1752 (Bishop of Durham)
- Richard Trevor 1752–1771 (Bishop of Durham)
- John Egerton 1771–1787 (Bishop of Durham)
- Thomas Thurlow 1787–1791 (Bishop of Durham)
- Shute Barrington 1791–1826 (Bishop of Durham)
- William Van Mildert 1826–1836 (Bishop of Durham)

For later custodes rotulorum, see Lord Lieutenant of Durham.
