= Robert Hastie (Royal Navy officer) =

Commodore Robert Cameron Hastie KCVO CBE KStJ RD JP (born 24 May 1933) is a former British senior Royal Naval Reserve officer who was the Lord-Lieutenant for West Glamorgan from April 1995 to May 2008.

In the 1983 New Year Honours, Hastie was appointed Commander of the Order of the British Empire (CBE). He was appointed Knight of the Venerable Order of St John (KStJ) in May 2006.

Honorary titles
| Preceded by Michael Llewellyn | Lord Lieutenant of West Glamorgan; 1995–2008 | Succeeded by D. Byron Lewis |
