= Lucy Winskell =

British lawyer and academic

Lucy Winskell OBE DL FRSA
- Education: Westfield High School; Durham University (MBA); Newcastle University
- Occupations: Lawyer and academic
- Organizations: Northumbria University
- Known for: Business leadership

Lucy Winskell is a British lawyer who is Pro Vice-Chancellor at Northumbria University. She was awarded an OBE in the 2014 Queen's Birthday Honours List in recognition for her services to Higher Education and the regional economy in the North East. She has served as the Lord Lieutenant of Tyne and Wear since 18 May 2022.

== Biography ==
Winskell went to school in Newcastle, studied Law at Newcastle University and completed an MBA at Durham University. During her time at Northumbria University, she has led the establishment of London and Amsterdam campuses.

She is Chair of the board of The North East Local Enterprise Partnership (North East LEP) and was Chair of the North East Committee of the Heritage Lottery Fund. Formerly she has been UK President of the Union Internationale des Avocats, and President of Newcastle Law Society, Chair of the ACCA Regulatory Board and Chairman of Live Theatre and a Trustee of Live Theatre and International Centre for Life.

Winskell served as High Sheriff of Tyne and Wear from 2015 to 2016. In February 2022, it was announced that she would serve as the Lord Lieutenant of Tyne and Wear, taking up the appointment on 18 May 2022.
