= Peter Vaughan (police officer) =

Welsh public servant and retired police chief

Chief Constable Peter Vaughan CBE CStJ QPM

Lord-lieutenant of Mid Glamorgan
- Incumbent
- Assumed office 17 April 2019
- Preceded by: Dame Kathrin Thomas

Chief Constable of South Wales Police
- In office January 2010 – 31 December 2017
- Preceded by: Barbara Wilding
- Succeeded by: Matt Jukes

Personal details
- Born: Peter James Vaughan; 7 September 1962 (age 64) Aberfan, South Wales
- Citizenship: United Kingdom
- Education: University College, Swansea, Fitzwilliam College, Cambridge

Peter James Vaughan, CBE, CStJ, QPM (born 7 September 1962) is a Welsh public servant and retired police chief. He served as the Chief Constable of South Wales Police from January 2010 to December 2017 and is currently Lord Lieutenant of Mid Glamorgan.

== Early life and education ==
Vaughan was born on 7 September 1962 in Aberfan, South Wales. He gained a first class Bachelor of Science degree in Management Science and Operations Research from the University College, Swansea.

== Career ==
Joining South Wales Police on graduation, he progressed to Superintendent leading the Community Safety Department. After a period with head office, he became head of the BCU in Merthyr Tydfil, and then Divisional Commander at Rhondda Cynon Taff.

Vaughan then attended the ACPO Strategic Command Course, and on graduation was appointed Assistant Chief Constable for Wiltshire Constabulary, during which time he led the investigation into the deaths at Tidworth Camp in July 2006. During this period he led the ACPO Police Dog Working Group and Public Order Events team. Vaughan also, starting 2003, studied part-time on the Police Executive Programme at Fitzwilliam College, Cambridge.

He returned to South Wales Police in January 2007 as Assistant Chief Constable, progressing to Deputy Chief Constable in April 2007. Appointed Chief Constable from January 2010, he took over from the retiring Barbara Wilding. Peter Vaughan retired as Chief Constable and left South Wales Police on 31 December 2017. He was succeeded as Chief Constable by Matt Jukes

== Honours ==

Ribbon	Description	Notes
	Order of the British Empire (CBE)	2026
	Order of St John (CStJ)	2013
	Queen's Police Medal (QPM)	
	Queen Elizabeth II Golden Jubilee Medal	
	Queen Elizabeth II Diamond Jubilee Medal	
	Police Long Service and Good Conduct Medal	

Vaughan was made a Commander of the British Empire in the 2026 New Year Honours Vaughan was awarded the Queen's Police Medal in the 2013 New Year Honours and was appointed Vice Lieutenant of Mid Glamorgan in 2018 and appointed as Lord Lieutenant of Mid Glamorgan in April 2019

Honorary titles
Preceded by Dame Kathrin Thomas	Lord Lieutenant of Mid Glamorgan; 2019–Present	Incumbent
Police appointments
Preceded by Barbara Wilding	Chief Constable of South Wales Police; 2010 to 2017	Next: Matt Jukes
