= Custos Rotulorum of Donegal =

Civil officer

The Custos Rotulorum of Donegal was the highest civil officer in County Donegal.

== Incumbents ==
- 1675–?1678 Arthur Chichester, 2nd Earl of Donegall (died 1678) (also Custos Rotulorum of Antrim, 1675–?)
- 1678–? William Stewart, 1st Viscount Mountjoy (died 1692)
- c.1700–?1723 Gustavus Hamilton, 1st Viscount Boyne (died 1723)
- 1777–1804 Robert Clements, 1st Earl of Leitrim
- 1804–1854 Nathaniel Clements, 2nd Earl of Leitrim

For later custodes rotulorum, see Lord Lieutenant of Donegal.
