= Custos Rotulorum of County Londonderry and Down =

The Custos Rotulorum of Londonderry and Down was the highest civil officer in counties Londonderry and Down.

== Incumbents ==
=== Londonderry ===
- 1663–1665 John Clotworthy, 1st Viscount Massereene
- 1666–1695 John Skeffington, 2nd Viscount Massereene (attainted 1689, reappointed 1693, died 1695)

=== Down ===
- 1660–1663 Hugh Montgomery, 1st Earl of Mount Alexander
- 1663–? William Montgomery (died 1706)
- 1678–1683 Michael Hill (died 1693) (also Custos Rotulorum of Antrim 1678-?)
- 1683–? Hugh Montgomery, 2nd Earl of Mount Alexander
- ?1693–?1699 Michael Hill (died 1699)
- 1729–1742 Trevor Hill, 1st Viscount Hillsborough (died 1742)
- 1742–1793 Wills Hill, 1st Marquess of Downshire
- 1793–?1801 Arthur Hill, 2nd Marquess of Downshire (died 1801)

=== Londonderry and Down ===
- 1803–?1821 Robert Stewart, 1st Marquess of Londonderry
- 1821–1822 Robert Stewart, Viscount Castlereagh
- 1822–?1854 Charles Vane, 3rd Marquess of Londonderry (died 1854)

For later custodes rotulorum, see Lord Lieutenant of Londonderry and Lord Lieutenant of Down
