= Hilary Chapman =

English nurse (born 1963)

Dame Hilary Anne Chapman, DBE FRCN (born 16 August 1963) is a British former Chief Nurse at Sheffield Teaching Hospitals NHS Foundation Trust and Honorary Professor at Sheffield Hallam University. She was appointed as Lord Lieutenant of South Yorkshire on 5 November 2021. She was named one of the NHS's most influential nurses.

== Biography ==
Chapman was born in 1963; her father managed a steelworks in Stocksbridge and her mother was a French teacher. Chapman has spent her entire career in nursing, beginning her training in 1983. She began and ended her main NHS career in Sheffield, starting in the cardiothoracic unit at the Northern General Hospital, and working in critical care. She worked at Kettering General Hospital, and University Hospitals Coventry and Warwickshire. She retired in 2018 as Chief Nurse at Sheffield Teaching Hospitals NHS Foundation Trust. From 2020 she works as an independent professional consultant. She has contributed to health policy, health care delivery and health system reform.

Chapman co-led, with Katherine Fenton, the development of the Safer Nursing Care Tool, which is now used widely in hospitals across the UK. She is an Honorary Professor at Sheffield Hallam University, an Honorary Doctor of Medicine at Sheffield University, and has served on the National Institute for Healthcare Research Advisory Board.

Chapman was awarded Fellowship of the Royal College of Nursing in 2018. She was named one of the NHS's most influential nurses.

Chapman was appointed a Deputy Lieutenant of South Yorkshire in 2016, and succeeded as Lord Lieutenant in November 2021.

She was appointed a Commander of the Order of the British Empire (CBE), and in the 2018 New Year Honours she was promoted to a Dame Commander of the Order (DBE), for services to nursing.

Chapman lives near Barnsley with her husband, Neil Chapman. She became a patron of Barnsley Hospice in 2023.

Honorary titles
Preceded by Andrew Coombe	Lord Lieutenant of South Yorkshire; 2021–	Succeeded by current
