= Wortley Rural District =

Former local government area in the UK

Coordinates: 53.449°N 1.570°W

Wortley
- History
  - Created: 1894
  - Abolished: 1974
  - Succeeded by: City of Sheffield; Metropolitan Borough of Barnsley
- Status: Rural district

Wortley was a rural district in the West Riding of Yorkshire from 1894 to 1974.

It was abolished in 1974 under the Local Government Act 1972, with the parishes of Bradfield and Ecclesfield going to the metropolitan borough of Sheffield and the parishes of Tankersley and Wortley going to the Metropolitan Borough of Barnsley.
