= Law enforcement in Jersey =

Law enforcement in Jersey is carried out by 14 agencies, one paid island-wide police force, one paid customs and immigration enforcement service, and twelve parish Honorary Police forces, one for each parish.

Jersey's Honorary Police forces
Parish	Chef de Police	Chef elected
Saint Helier Honorary Police		
Grouville Honorary Police		
Saint Brelade Honorary Police	Michel C Bougeard	10 September 2021
Saint Clement Honorary Police	R Beaumont	13 March 2020
Saint John Honorary Police		
Saint Lawrence Honorary Police	Stuart Lusby	
Saint Martin Honorary Police	G Jones	13 March 2020
Saint Mary Honorary Police		
Saint Ouen Honorary Police		
Saint Peter Honorary Police	Joao Camara	
Saint Saviour Honorary Police		
Trinity Honorary Police		

Island-wide law enforcement is managed by the States of Jersey:

- States of Jersey Police
- States of Jersey Customs and Immigration Service
