= Lord Lieutenant of South Yorkshire =

Civil post in South Yorkshire, England

This is a list of those who have held the position of Lord Lieutenant of South Yorkshire:

The post was created on 1 April 1974, covering the new metropolitan county of South Yorkshire. This area had previously been covered by the West Riding lieutenancy.

There is also one Vice Lord Lieutenant and a host of Deputy Lord Lieutenants.

== Lord Lieutenants ==
- 1974 – 1985: Gerard F. Young
- 1985 – 1996: J. Hugh Neill
- 1996 – 2003: Richard Lumley, 12th Earl of Scarbrough
- 2004 – 2015: David B. Moody
- 2015 – 2021: Andrew J. Coombe,
- November 2021: Professor Dame Hilary Chapman

== Vice Lord Lieutenants ==
- 1981–1990: Roger Inman
- 1990–1996: Richard A. Lumley, 12th Earl of Scarbrough
- 1997–2010: Peter W. Lee
- 2010–2016: Dr R. J. G. Bloomer
- 2016–: John R. Holt
- –2024: Anthony Pedder is to step down on 29 June 2024, and will be replaced by Jane Marshall.

== See also ==
- List of lord lieutenants in the United Kingdom
