= Lord Lieutenant of Tyne and Wear =

Civil post in Tyne and Wear, England

This is a complete list of people who have served as Lord Lieutenant of Tyne and Wear, since the creation of the county on 1 April 1974:

- James Steel (1 April 1974 to 1984)
- Sir Ralph Carr-Ellison (1984 to 2000)
- Sir Nigel Sherlock (2000 to 2015)
- Susan Margaret Winfield (2015 to 2022)
- Lucy Winskell (from 18 May 2022)
