= Lord Lieutenant of West Glamorgan =

Welsh county ceremonial officer

This is a list of people who have served as Lord Lieutenant for West Glamorgan. The office was created on 1 April 1974.

- Sir Cennydd Traherne, † 1 April 1974 – 1987?
  - Lieutenant of West Glamorgan Col. James Williams DL, 1 April 1974 – 1987
- Lt.-Col. Sir Michael Llewellyn, 2nd Baronet, 11 December 1987 – 8 September 1994
- Commodore Sir Robert Hastie, 10 April 1995 – 24 May 2008
- D. Byron Lewis, June 2008 to 14 February 2020
- R. Louise Fleet CStJ JP, 16 March 2020 to present.

† Also Lord Lieutenant of Mid Glamorgan and South Glamorgan. Each of the three Counties had a separate Lieutenant serving under the joint Lord Lieutenancy. Three separate Lord Lieutenants were appointed on his retirement
