= Lord Lieutenant of South Glamorgan =

Welsh county ceremonial officer

This is a list of people who have served as Lord Lieutenant for South Glamorgan. The office was created on 1 April 1974.

- Sir Cennydd Traherne, † 1 April 1974 – 1985
  - Lieutenant of South Glamorgan Sir Hugo Boothby, 14th Baronet 1 April 1974 – 30 May 1986?
- Susan Williams 1985–1990
- Sir Norman Lloyd-Edwards 11 September 1990 – 13 June 2008
- Peter Beck 14 June 2008 - 4 July 2016
- Morfudd Meredith 5 July 2016 -

† Also Lord Lieutenant of Mid Glamorgan and West Glamorgan. Each of the three Counties had a separate Lieutenant serving under the joint Lord Lieutenancy. Three separate Lord Lieutenants were appointed on his retirement
