= Lord Lieutenant of Mid Glamorgan =

Welsh county ceremonial officer

This is a list of people who have served as Lord Lieutenant of Mid Glamorgan. Before the division of the county on 1 April 1974, the Monarch was represented by the Lord Lieutenant of Glamorgan.

- Sir Cennydd Traherne, † 1 April 1974 – 1985
  - Lieutenant of Mid Glamorgan Henry Knight 1 April 1974 – ?
- Douglas Badham 16 December 1985 – 1989
- Murray McLaggan 5 March 1990 – 23 December 2002
- Dame Kathrin Thomas 23 December 2003 – 2019
- Peter Vaughan 17 April 2019 – present

† Also Lord Lieutenant of South Glamorgan and West Glamorgan. Each of the three Counties had a separate Lieutenant serving under the joint Lord Lieutenancy. Three separate Lord Lieutenants were appointed on his retirement.
