= City of Sheffield =

City in South Yorkshire, England

Sheffield
- City and metropolitan borough
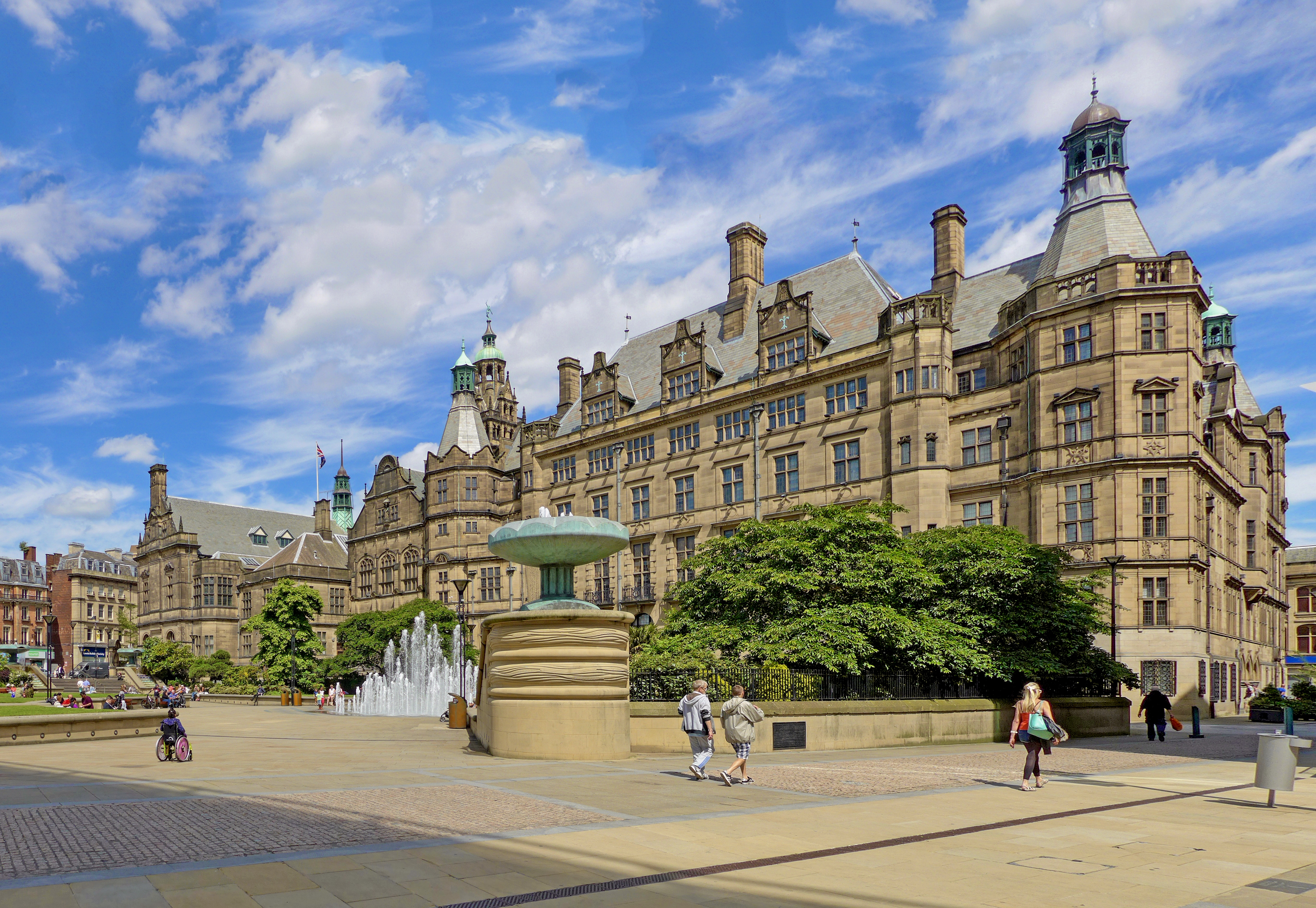
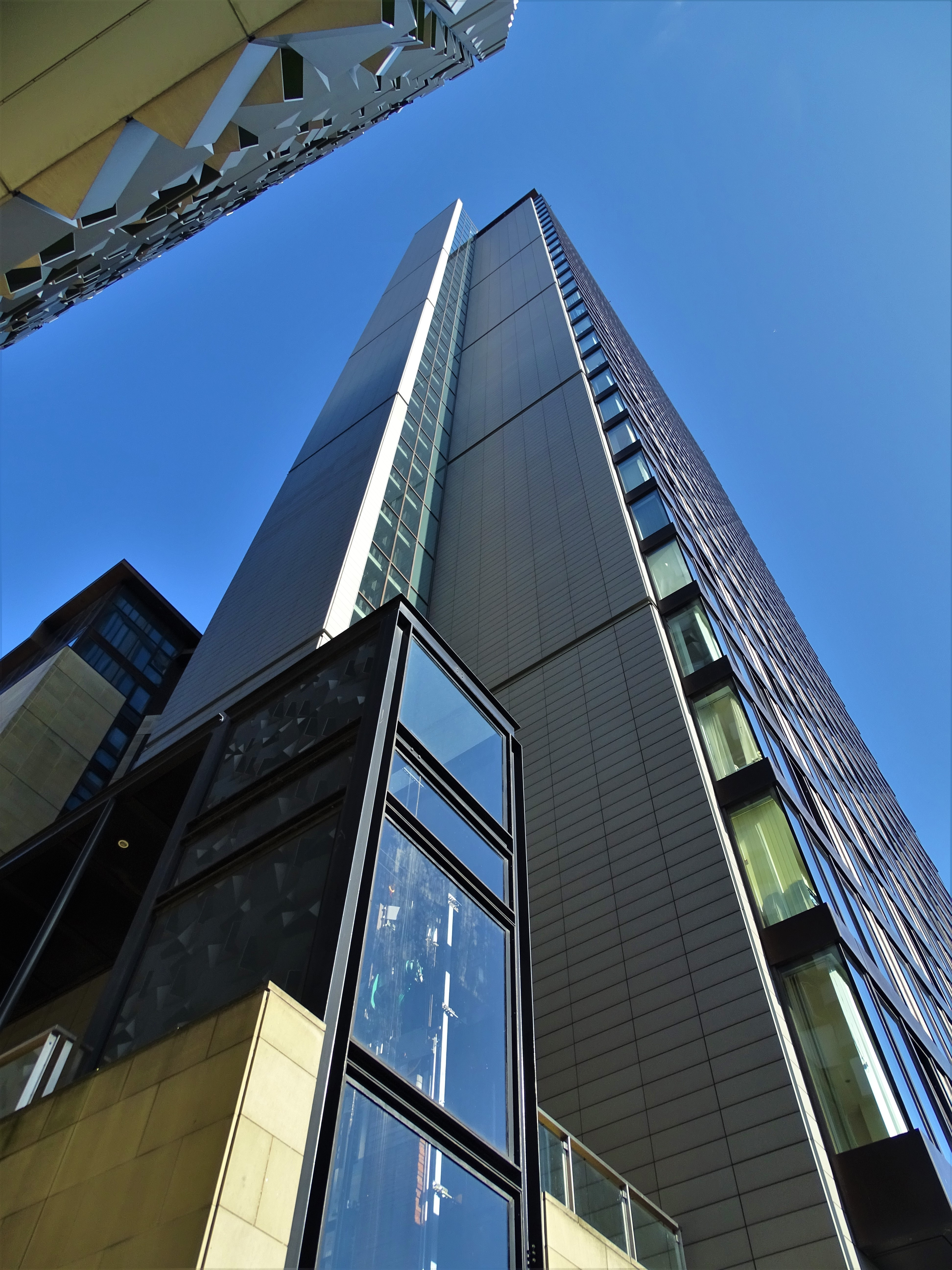
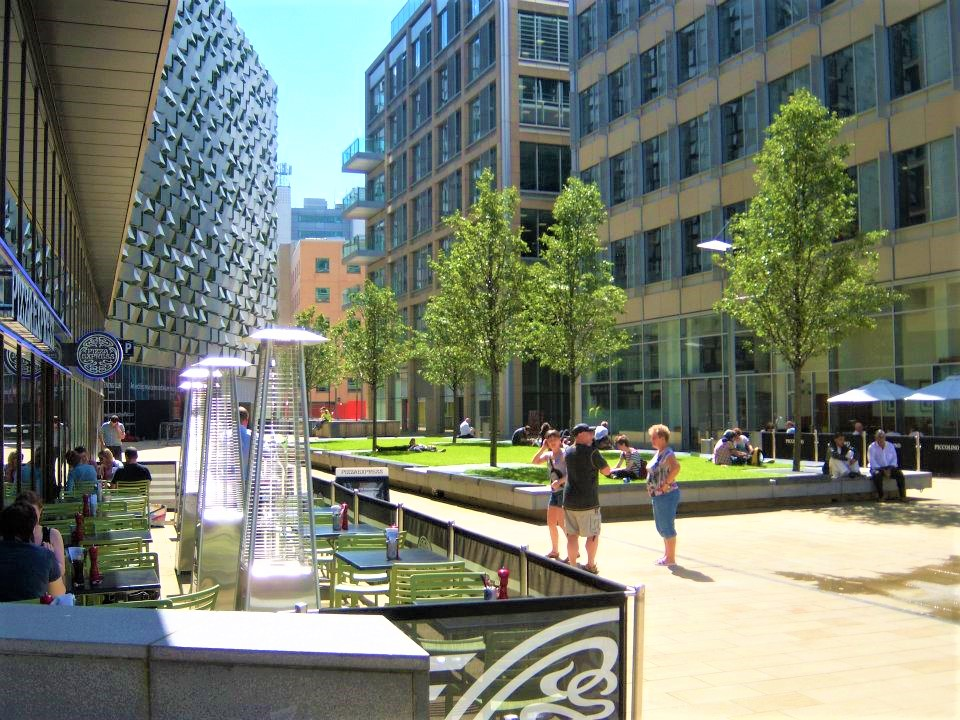
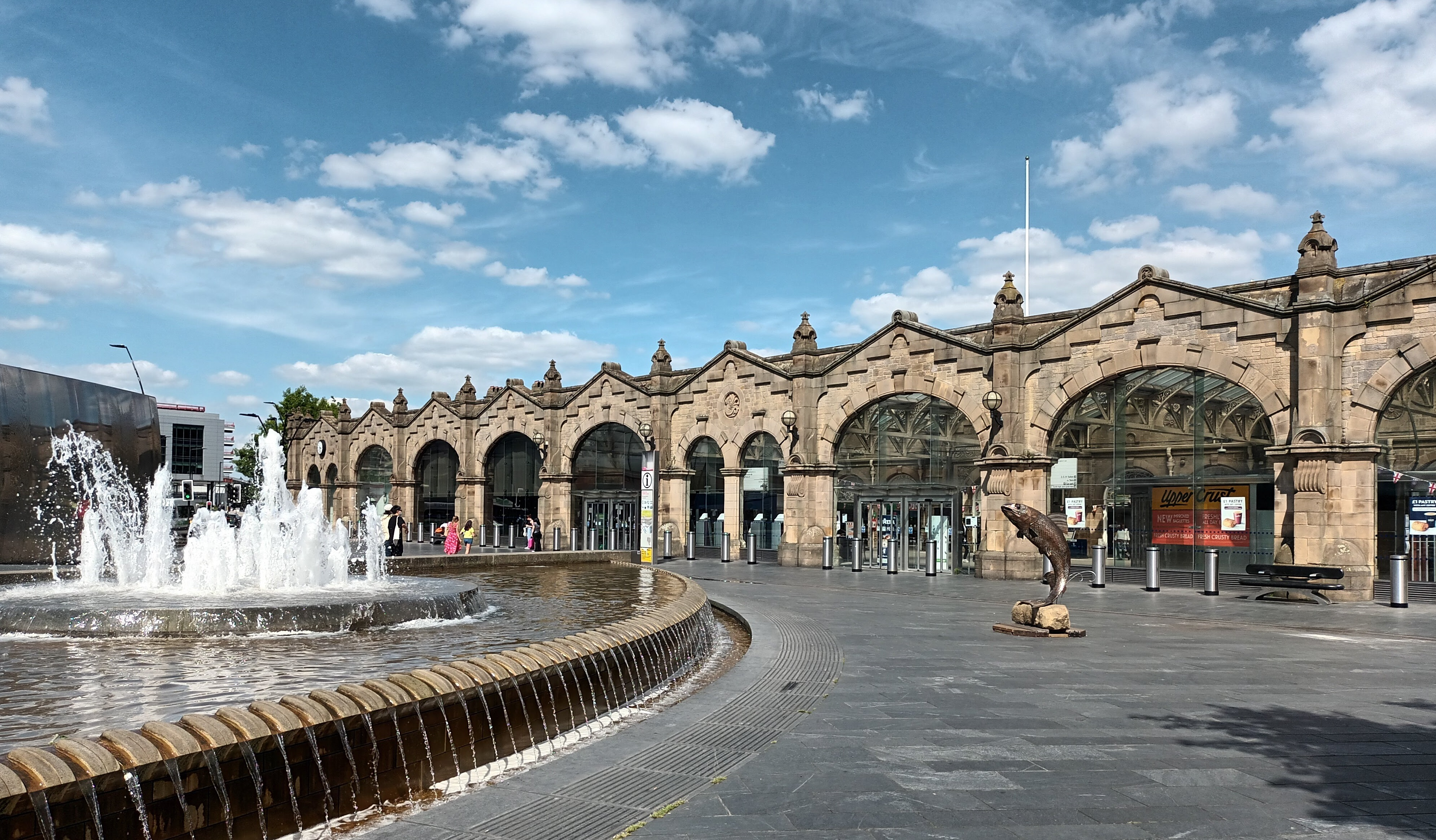
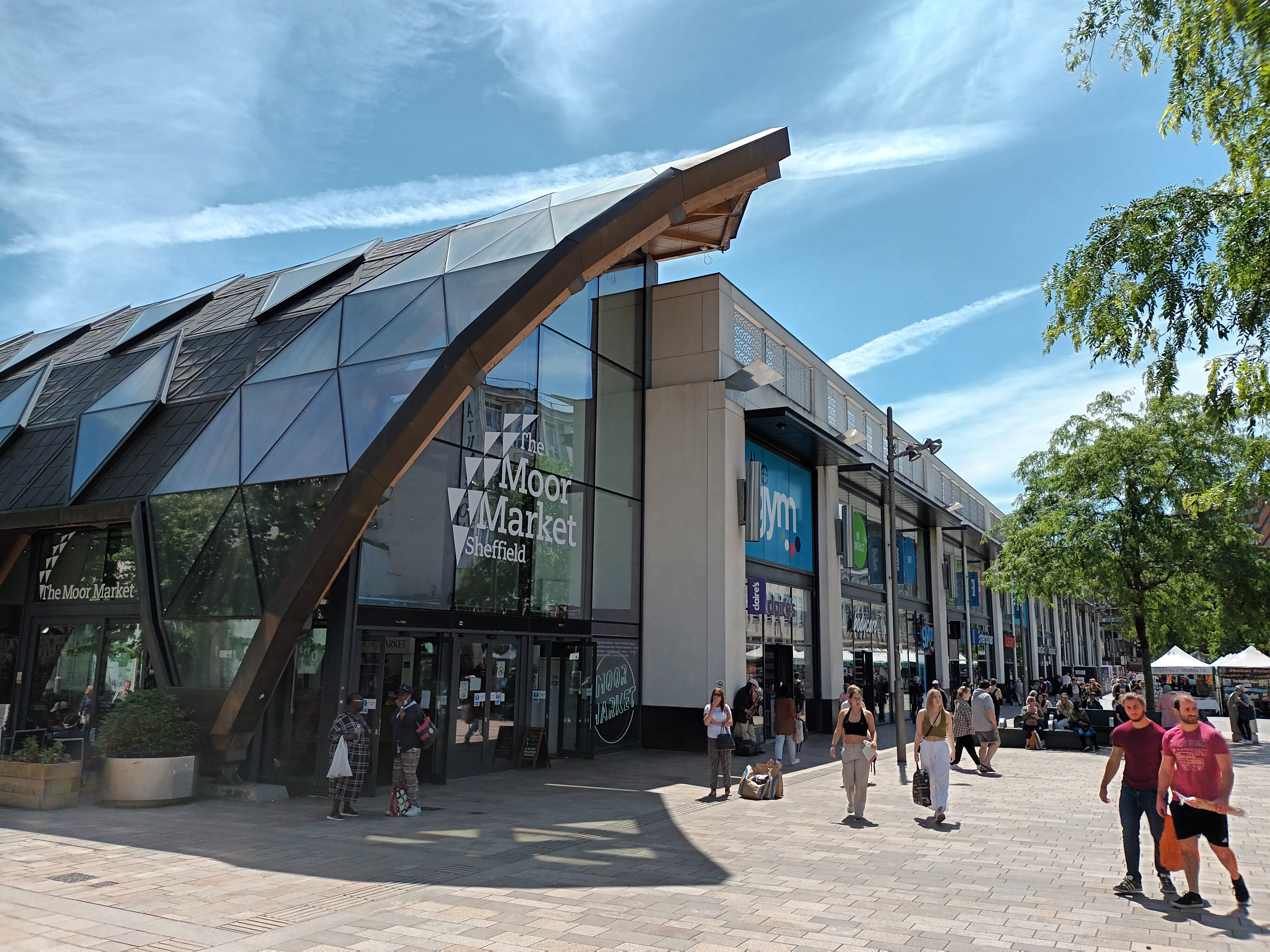
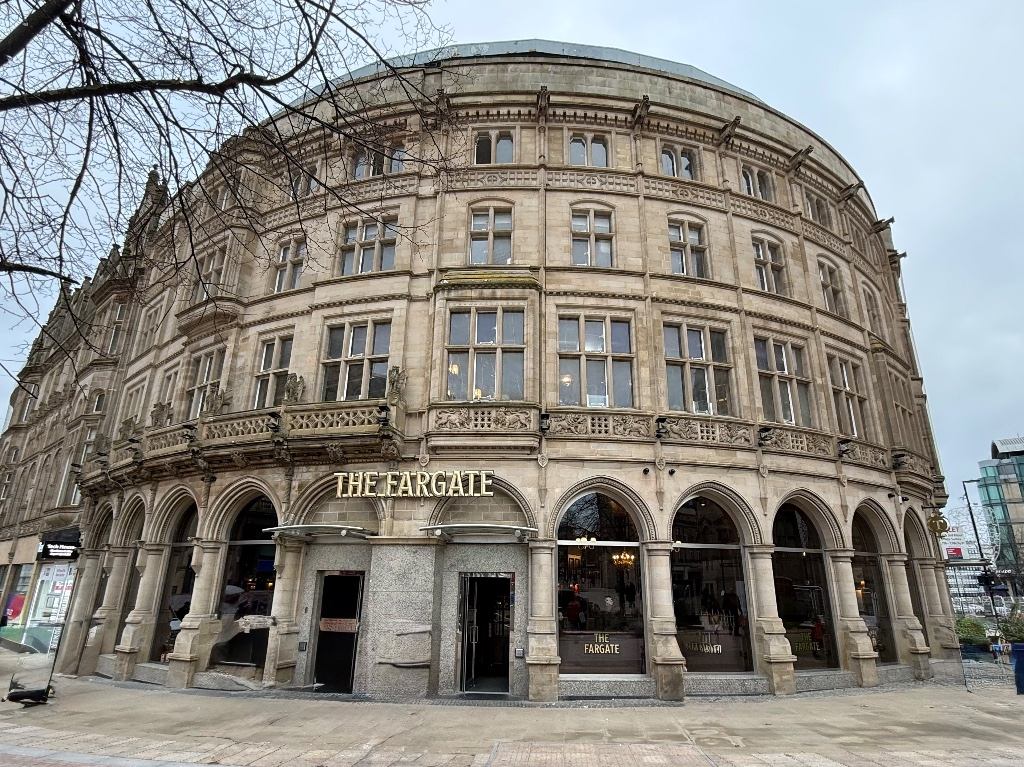
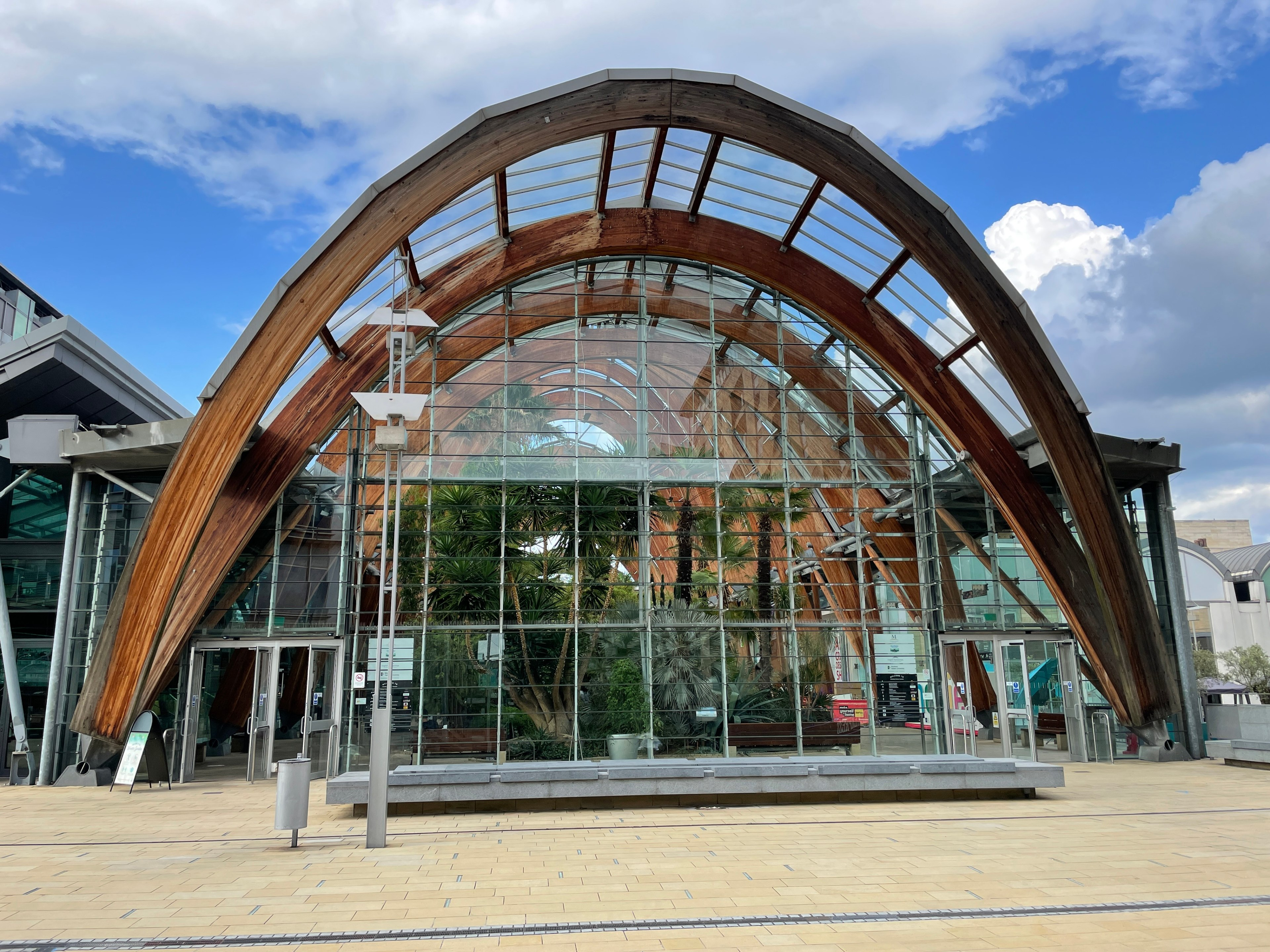
- Town Hall St Paul's Tower Millennium Square Sheffield Station The Moor Fargate Winter Garden

- Coat of arms
- Nickname: Steel City
- Motto: Latin: Deo Adjuvante Labor Proficit, lit. 'With God's help our labour is successful'
- Sheffield shown within South Yorkshire

- Location within England Location within the United Kingdom Location in Europe
- Coordinates: 53.3824°N 1.4685°W
- OS grid reference: SK 3544 8742
- Sovereign state: United Kingdom
- Country: England
- Region: Yorkshire and the Humber
- City region and ceremonial county: South Yorkshire
- Historic counties: Yorkshire; Derbyshire
- Founded: 8th century AD
- Town charter: 10 August 1297
- City status: 1893
- Named for: Sheffield
- Administrative HQ: Sheffield Town Hall

Government
  - Type: Metropolitan borough with committee system
  - Body: Sheffield City Council
  - Control: No overall control
  - Leader: Fran Belbin (L)
  - Lord Mayor: Andrew Sangar
  - Chief Executive: Kate Josephs
  - House of Commons: 6 MPs: Clive Betts (L); Olivia Blake (L); Abtisam Mohamed (L); Marie Tidball (L); Gill Furniss (L); Louise Haigh (L)

Area
  - Total: 142 sq mi (368 km^{2})
  - Rank: 95th

Population (2025)
  - Total: 579,517
  - Rank: 8th
  - Density: 4,080/sq mi (1,575/km^{2})
- Demonym: Sheffielder

Ethnicity (2021)
  - Ethnic groups: List: 79.1% White; 9.6% Asian; 4.6% Black; 3.5% Mixed; 3.2% other

Religion (2021)
  - Religion: List: 43.4% no religion; 38.5% Christianity; 10.3% Islam; 0.7% Hinduism; 0.4% Buddhism; 0.2% Sikhism; 0.1% Judaism; 0.5% other; 6.0% not stated
- Time zone: UTC+0 (GMT)
  - Summer (DST): UTC+1 (BST)
- Postcode area: S
- Dialling code: 0114
- ISO 3166 code: GB-SHF
- GSS code: E08000019
- ITL code: TLE32
- GVA: 2021 estimate
  - Total: £13.7 billion
  - Per capita: £24,670
- GDP (nominal): 2021 estimate
  - Total: £15.4 billion
  - Per capita: £27,805
- Website: sheffield.gov.uk

The City of Sheffield is a metropolitan borough with city status in South Yorkshire, England. The metropolitan borough includes the administrative centre of Sheffield, the town of Stocksbridge and the larger village of Chapeltown and part of the Peak District. It has a population of 579,517 (2025). It is the 7th largest local authority area in England behind Birmingham, Leeds and Manchester, since London is not considered a single entity. It is governed by Sheffield City Council.

The current city boundaries were set on 1 April 1974 by the provisions of the Local Government Act 1972, as part of a reform of local government in England. The city is a merger of two former local government districts; the unitary City and County Borough of Sheffield combined with the urban district of Stocksbridge and parts of the rural district of Wortley from the West Riding of Yorkshire.

For its first 12 years, the city had a two-tier system of local government; Sheffield City Council shared power with South Yorkshire County Council. Since the Local Government Act 1985 Sheffield City Council has effectively been a unitary authority, serving as the sole executive, deliberative and legislative body responsible for local policy, setting council tax, and allocating budget in the city, and is a member of the Sheffield City Region Partnership. The City of Sheffield is divided into three civil parishes and a single unparished area.

== Geography ==
The present city boundaries were set in 1974 (with slight modification in 1994), when the former county borough of Sheffield merged with Stocksbridge Urban District and two parishes from the Wortley Rural District. This area includes a significant part of the countryside surrounding the main urban region. Roughly a third of Sheffield lies in the Peak District National Park. No other English city had parts of a national park within its boundary, until the creation in March 2010 of the South Downs National Park, part of which lies within Brighton and Hove.

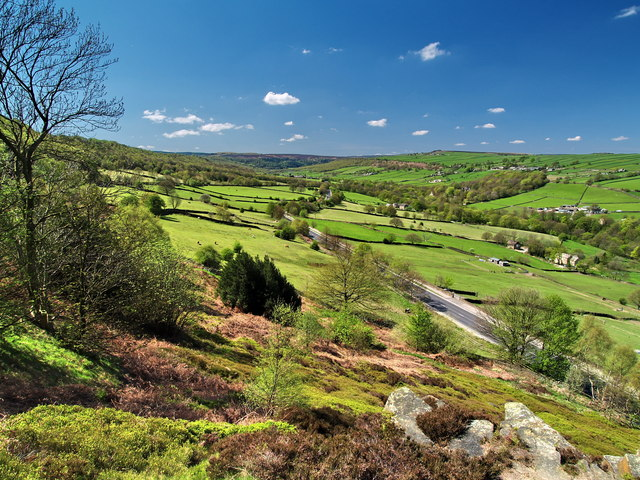
Rivelin Valley

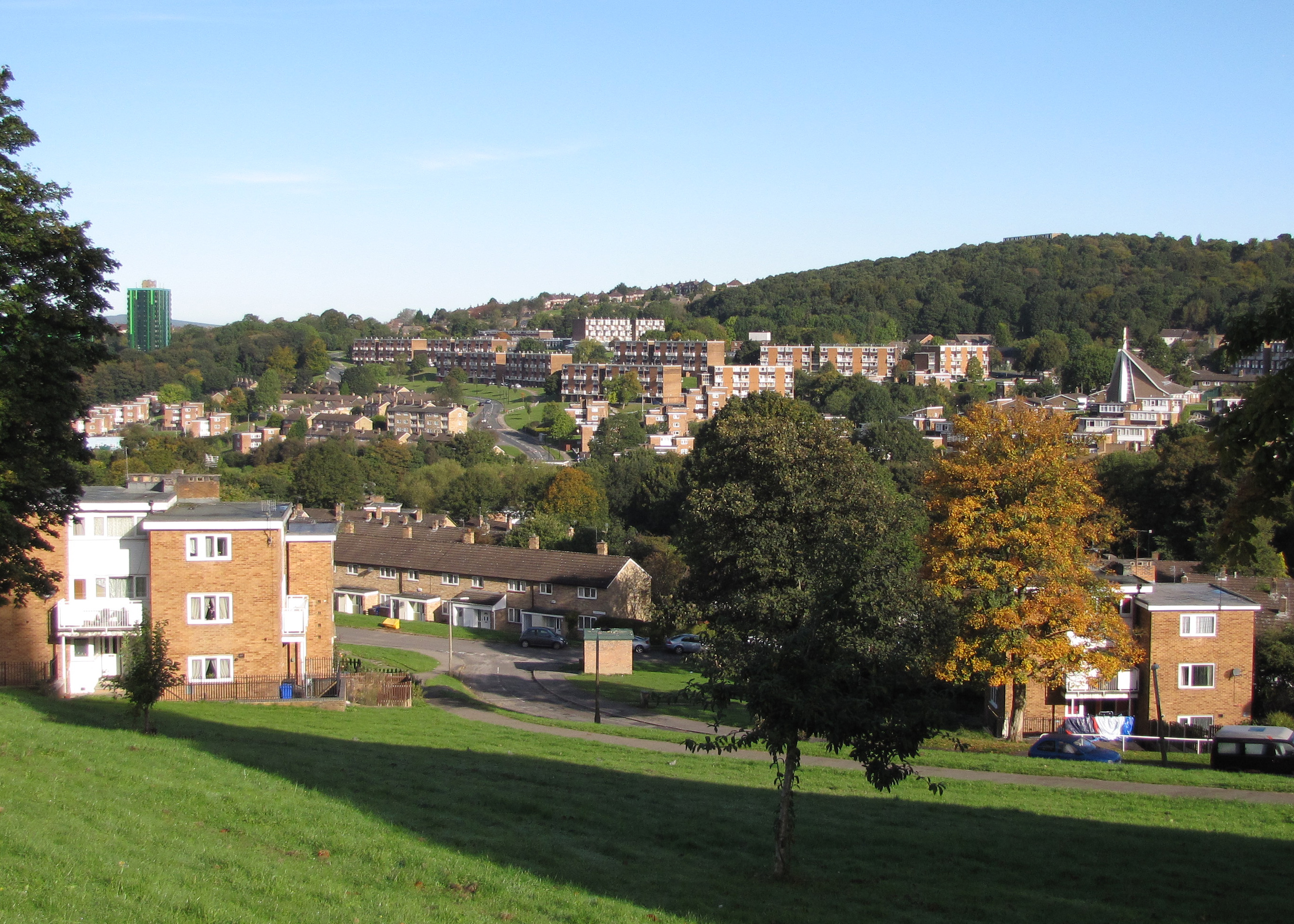
Gleadless Valley, demonstrating the hilly terrain within the city

== Governance ==
Sheffield City Council is the local authority for the metropolitan borough. The council is composed of 84 councillors, three for each of the city's 28 wards. It is currently under No Overall Control. The city was under Labour control from its creation until 1999, when the Liberal Democrats took control of the council. The Labour Party regained control of the council in 2002 with power shifting back to the Liberal Democrats in 2008. However, Labour took control once again in 2011. Following the 2021 elections, the council is now in No Overall Control. As a metropolitan county, South Yorkshire does not have a county council, so Sheffield City Council is the primary provider of local government services. The borough forms part of the Yorkshire and the Humber region of England.

The area of the former county borough of Sheffield is unparished with no lower tier of government and there are three civil parishes with parish councils, the lowest tier of local government. The civil parishes are: Bradfield, Ecclesfield and Stocksbridge.

The district is represented by five MPs, for the constituencies of Sheffield Brightside and Hillsborough, Sheffield Central, Sheffield Hallam, Sheffield Heeley, and Sheffield South East, all currently represented by Labour. The constituency of Penistone and Stocksbridge is partially in the City of Sheffield and is also represented by the Labour Party.

== Demography ==
The latest (2025) population estimate for the City of Sheffield is 579,517 residents.

== Transport ==
Parts of the city are covered by the Sheffield Supertram light rail tram network.
