= Custos rotulorum =

Civic post in Jamaica and the UK

Custos rotulorum (/ˈkʌstɒs roʊtjʊˈlɔːrəm/; plural: custodes rotulorum; Latin for "keeper of the rolls", Neo-Latin: [ˈkus.tos roˈtuː.lo.rum]) is a civic post that is recognised in the United Kingdom (except Scotland) and in Jamaica.

== England ==
As of 1911, the custos rotulorum was the keeper of English county records and, by virtue of that office, the highest civil officer in the county. The position is now largely ceremonial.

The appointment lay with the Lord Chancellor until 1545, but is now exercised by the Crown, under the Royal sign-manual, and is usually held by a person of rank. The appointment has been united with that of the lord-lieutenancy of the county throughout England since 1836. The custos rotulorum of Lancashire was formerly appointed by the Chancellor of the Duchy of Lancaster, and that of County Durham vested in the Bishop of Durham until the abolition of its palatine rights. Traditionally, he was one of the justices of the peace. The custos rotulorum of the Isle of Ely remained the Bishop of Ely until the Liberty of Ely Act 1837.

In practice, the records were in the custody of the clerk of the peace. This latter official was, until 1888, appointed by the custos rotulorum, but following the passing of the Local Government Act of that year, the appointment was made by the standing joint committee of the county council. The post of clerk of the peace was abolished by the Courts Act 1971.

William Lambarde (1536–1601) described the custos rotulorum as a man chosen for his wisdom, countenance or credit.

== Ireland ==
The role of custos rotulorum was also adopted in the Kingdom of Ireland, usually abbreviated as the post-nominal "CoRo". From 1831 the title passed to the pre-existing Lord Lieutenant of every county as office-holder, and from then the list of lords lieutenant of County Dublin corresponded with the Custos Rotulorum of Dublin. Custodes rotulorum were abolished by the Local Government (Ireland) Act 1898. In 1922 the creation of the Irish Free State resulted in the abolition of the by-then largely honorific posts, but Lord Lieutenancies are still retained in Northern Ireland.

== Jamaica ==
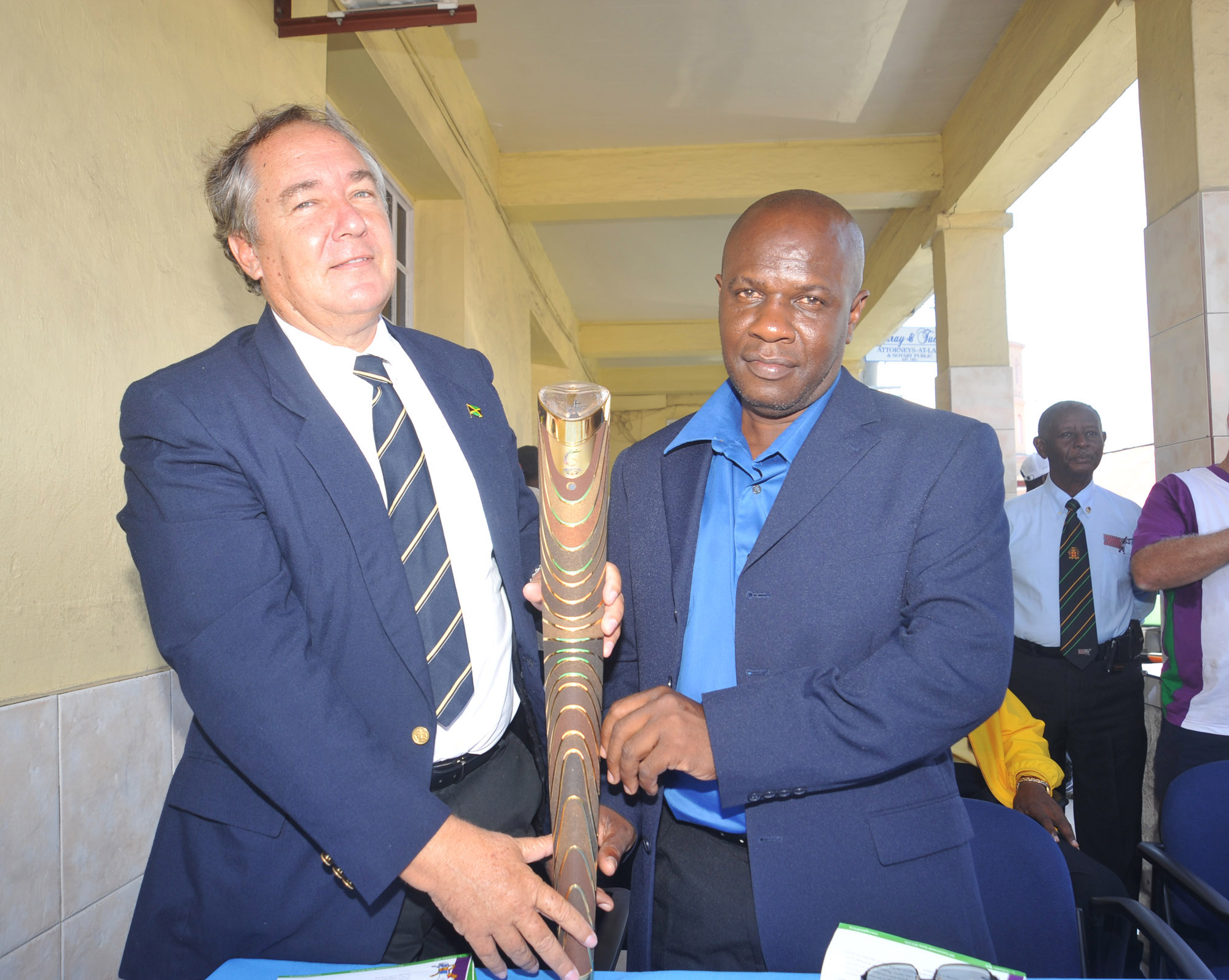
Paul Muschett, Custos Rotulorum of Trelawny Parish and Collen Gager, Mayor of Falmouth posing with the Queen's Baton, 2010.

=== History ===
The Office of the Custos evolved in Jamaica and The Cayman Islands from its colonial past. It can be traced back to fourteenth-century England when in 1391 King Richard II issued the Grand Commission appointing Custodes and Justices of the Peace to assist in maintaining law and order in the counties.

In Jamaica, the first mention of the office appears in Legislative Council Minutes of 28 July 1668 in an ordinance dealing with the 'Orderly Proceedings of the Courts' within the island. The holder of the Office of Custos was described as the first citizen of the parish appointed by the Governor as his representative to assist in the maintenance of good order and discipline in the parish, and upholding the rule of law. The first Custos mentioned by name was Henry Morgan as the Custos of Port Royal during the Governorship of the Earl of Carlisle in 1680.

The Custos Rotulorum or Keeper of the Roll of the Justices of the Peace must be a Justice of the Peace and have dealt with such minor criminal charges as are within his jurisdiction. The duties and powers of the Custos at various times have included:

- to preside at Petty Sessions Court and be the Chief Magistrate for the parish.
- to receive the Sovereign, any representative of the royal family, His Excellency The Governor as representing the sovereign when within the precincts of the parish.
- to recommend to the Governor from time to time ‘gentlemen' for commission as Justices as the parish required.
- to be an ex-officio member of the Parochial Board. In this capacity, he could exercise very beneficial influence. He was required to attend the meetings of the Board as often as possible.
- to visit from time to time the hospitals, poorhouses and other institutions, including every prison in the parish, and to discover any abuse therein and report the same to the Governor. This was aimed at ensuring that the affairs of these institutions were conducted properly.
- except in the parish of Kingston, to appoint one or more polling places at all elections and one or more persons to keep the poll at the elections of the Vestrymen (now Parish Councillors) and the Church Wardens (that is the Church of England or Anglican denomination).
- to be the chairman of the Board of Highways and Bridges in the parish.

=== Appointment and duties ===
Ministry Paper Numbered 2, Appendix I, approved by Parliament on the 5th day of July 1959 and gazetted on the 5th day of February 1963 outlined that there shall be a Custos Rotulorum for every parish in Jamaica. The Custos shall be appointed by the Governor-General acting on the advice of the Prime Minister and shall be a resident of the parish to which he is appointed, save in the case of the Corporate Area.

That document also specified the functions and duties of the Custos as:

- to hold office during the Governor-General's pleasure and in any event vacate his office on transferring his residence from the parish (or the Corporate Area in the case of Kingston and St. Andrew) or on attaining the age of seventy-five years, unless specially requested to continue in office, provided that the age limit shall not apply to Custodes who were appointed prior to 1958.
- To be the representative of the Governor-General within the parish. It is his duty, in the absence of the Governor-General, to receive the Sovereign, any member of the royal family, the Prime Minister on an official visit, or any important personage commended by the Governor-General who arrives within the precincts of the parish. It is his duty to receive the Governor-General when he pays official visits to the parish.
- To be the Chief Magistrate of the parish, and to prepare a roster of the Justices of the Peace within the parish so that there are sufficient JPs at each meeting of the Petty Sessions Court and in the various districts to carry out the work.
- To be the chairman of the committee in each parish which is responsible for making recommendations to the Minister of Home Affairs in regard to suitable persons for appointment as Justices of the Peace.
- on behalf of the Governor-General, to interest himself in the work of all voluntary organizations in the parish, and ensure that their activities receive suitable recognition on public occasions.
- To meet the Judge of the Circuit Court at the Court House at the opening session.

In addition to the above, Custodes in recent times have served as:

- Chairman of the Governor-General's Achievement Awards Committee
- Chairman of the Parish Advisory Committee on Local Government Reform
- Chairman of the Community Consultative Committee for the parish
- Co-Chairman, along with the Mayor, of the Labour Day Committee
- Chairman of the Prime Minister's Values and Attitudes Committee for the parish
- Chairman of the parish Disaster Preparedness Committee
- President of the Lay Magistrates Association

=== Privileges ===
The Custos is entitled to the following:

- to be referred to as "Honourable" both during his tenure of office and after retirement.
- to affix a pair of official "C R" (Custos Rotulorum) plates to his motor vehicle.
- to be conferred with a National Honour of no less a rank than that of Order of Distinction (Commander Class) upon his appointment or soon thereafter.

== See also ==
- Lists of custodes rotulorum
- Master of the Rolls
- The Custos Rotulorum Act 1545
