= Brabazon (name) =

Brabazon is a given name and surname.

== People with the surname ==
- Baron Brabazon of Tara, a title in the Peerage of the United Kingdom
  - John Moore-Brabazon, 1st Baron Brabazon of Tara, (1884–1964), English aviation pioneer and Conservative politician, chair of the Brabazon Committee in 1942
  - Derek Moore-Brabazon, 2nd Baron Brabazon of Tara (1910–1974)
  - Ivon Moore-Brabazon, 3rd Baron Brabazon of Tara, (born 1946), British Conservative politician
- Brabazon baronets, a title in the Baronetage of Ireland
  - Sir William Brabazon, 2nd Baronet
- Earl of Meath, a title in the Peerage of Ireland held by the head of the Brabazon family, including a list of Earls with the surname
- Aubrey Brabazon (1920–1996), Irish jockey
- Edward Brabazon (disambiguation), several people
- Francis Brabazon (1907–1984), Australian poet
- Gerald Hugh Brabazon (1854–1938), Canadian politician
- Hercules Brabazon Brabazon (1821–1906), English artist
- James Brabazon (born 1972), British documentary filmmaker, journalist, and author
- John Brabazon (disambiguation), several people
- Leslie Seth-Smith (1923–2007), known as James Brabazon, screenwriter and author
- Malby Brabazon (1588–1637), Irish politician
- Mary Jane Brabazon, Countess of Meath (1847–1918), British philanthropist, creator of the Brabazon scheme
- Roger Brabazon (c. 1247 – 1317), English lawyer, and Chief Justice of the King's Bench
- Ryan Brabazon (born 1986), Australian rules footballer
- Tara Brabazon (born 1969), Australian academic
- Tom Brabazon (born 1969/1970), Irish politician
- William Brabazon (disambiguation), several people

== People with the given name ==
- Brabazon Casement (1852–1910), Irish rugby player
- Brabazon Disney, mid 19th century Irish clergyman
- Brabazon Newcomen (1688–1766), Anglo-Irish politician
- Brabazon Ponsonby, 1st Earl of Bessborough (1679–1758), British politician and peer

== See also ==
- Brabazon (disambiguation)
- Major Brabazon-Plank, recurring fictional character created by P. G. Wodehouse
- Peter Glenville (Peter Patrick Brabazon Browne, 1913–1996), English actor and director
