= William Brabazon =

William Brabazon may refer to:

- Sir William Brabazon (Leics MP 1313), MP for Leicestershire 1313 & MP for Northamptonshire 1343
- William Brabazon (Lord Justice of Ireland) (died 1552), government official in the Kingdom of Ireland
- William Brabazon, 1st Earl of Meath (c. 1580–1651), Anglo-Irish peer
- Sir William Brabazon, 2nd Baronet (1778–1840), Anglo-Irish MP
- William Brabazon, 9th Earl of Meath (1769–1797), Anglo-Irish peer
- William Brabazon, 11th Earl of Meath (1803–1887), Irish peer
