= John Allen, 1st Viscount Allen =

Irish peer and politician

Captain John Allen, 1st Viscount Allen, PC (13 February 1660 – 8 November 1726), was an Irish peer and politician.

He was born in Dublin, the son of Sir Joshua Allen who was Lord Mayor of Dublin in 1673-74. He was educated at Trinity College Dublin.

In 1691 he was appointed High Sheriff of County Dublin and then represented County Dublin as an MP three times, from 1692 to 1693, from 1703 to 1713 and from 1715 to 1717. Allen sat also as Member of Parliament (MP) for County Carlow between 1795 and 1703 and then for County Wicklow between 1713 and 1715. On 28 August 1717, he was created Baron Allen, of Stillorgan, in County Dublin, and Viscount Allen in County Kildare.

== Family ==
He married Mary FitzGerald, daughter of Hon. Robert FitzGerald, son of The 16th Earl of Kildare and Lady Jane Boyle, on 23 July 1684. They had three children:

- Joshua Allen, 2nd Viscount Allen (1685–1742)
- Hon. Richard A. Allen b. bet. 1687 – 1697, died 1745; he married Dorothy Greene, daughter of Major Samuel Greene of Killaghy, County Tipperary, and had issue, including the 4th and 5th Viscounts
- Hon. Robert Allen (died 1741): he married Frances Johnson, daughter of Robert Johnson, Baron of the Court of Exchequer (Ireland) and Margaret Dixon of Calverstown, County Kildare, and had five children, including two surviving daughters, Mary and Frances.

Parliament of Ireland
| Preceded by Simon Luttrell; Patrick Sarsfield | Member of Parliament for County Dublin; 1692–1695; With: Chambre Brabazon | Succeeded by Robert Molesworth; Edward Deane |
| Preceded by Sir Thomas Butler, 3rd Bt; John Trench | Member of Parliament for County Carlow; 1695–1703; With: Sir Thomas Butler, 3rd Bt | Succeeded by Sir Thomas Butler, 3rd Bt; Pierce Butler |
| Preceded by Robert Molesworth; Edward Deane | Member of Parliament for County Dublin; 1703–1713; With: Joseph Deane | Succeeded by Chaworth Brabazon, Lord Brabazon; Joseph Deane |
| Preceded by William Whitshed; Richard Edwards | Member of Parliament for County Wicklow; 1713–1715; With: William Whitshed | Succeeded by Henry Percy; Robert Allen |
| Preceded by Chaworth Brabazon, Lord Brabazon; Joseph Deane | Member of Parliament for County Dublin; 1715–1717; With: Hon. Edward Brabazon | Succeeded by Hon. Edward Brabazon; William Domvile |
Peerage of Ireland
| New creation | Viscount Allen; 1717–1726 | Succeeded by Joshua Allen |
