= Calcot Chambre =

English parliamentarian (1573–1635)

Member of Parliament for Banbury
- In office 1626–1626

Personal details
- Born: c. 1573 Williamscote, Oxfordshire
- Died: 29 October 1635 (aged 62) Carnew, County Wicklow
- Relations: Chambré Brabazon (grandson) Chaworth Brabazon (great grandson) Edward Brabazon (great grandson)

Calcot Chambre (c. 1573 – 29 October 1635) was an English-Irish parliamentarian who was Member of Parliament for Banbury in the Parliament of 1626.

Chambre was born in Williamscote, Oxfordshire and died and was buried in Carnew, County Wicklow, Ireland.

== See also ==
- List of MPs elected to the English parliament in 1626
