= John Bramston the Elder =

English judge (1577–1654)

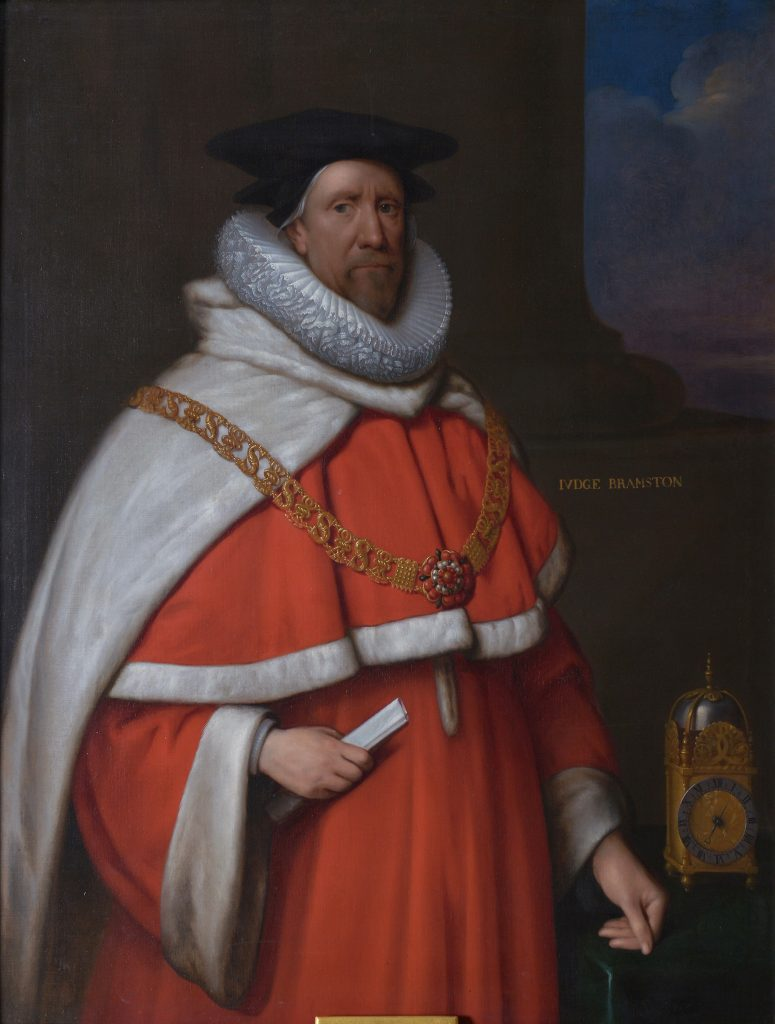
Sir John Bramston

Sir John Bramston (or Brampston) the elder (18 May 1577 – 22 September 1654) was an English judge and Chief Justice of the King's Bench.

== Early life and career ==
Bramston, eldest son of Roger Bramston by Priscilla, daughter of Francis Clovile of West Hanningfield Hall, Essex, was born at Maldon, in the same county, 18 May 1577, and educated at the free school at Maldon and Jesus College, Cambridge. On leaving the university he went into residence at the Middle Temple, and applied himself diligently to the study of the law. His ability was recognised early by his university, which made him one of its counsels in 1607, with an annual fee of forty shillings. In Lent 1623 he was appointed reader at his inn, the subject of his lecture being the Statute of Limitations 1540 (32 Hen. 8. c. 2), and he was reappointed in the autumn of the same year, this time discoursing on the statute of Elizabeth relating to fraudulent conveyances (Fraudulent Conveyances Act 1571). Shortly after his reading was concluded he was called to the degree of serjeant-at-law (22 September 1623). His son (Sir John Bramston, the younger) remarks that this was an expensive year for him, the costs entailed by the office of reader being considerable, besides the fee of £500 to the exchequer payable on admittance to the order of Serjeants. His practice now became extensive, and during the next few years he was engaged in many cases of the highest importance, not only in the courts of common law, but in chancery and in the courts of Wards and Star Chamber. In 1626 he defended the Earl of Bristol on his impeachment. A dissolution of Parliament, however, soon relieved Bramston from this duty, by putting an end to the proceedings. Next year he represented Sir Thomas Darnel and Sir John Heveningham, who had been committed to the Fleet for refusing to contribute to a loan and then being raised by the king without the consent of Parliament, applying unsuccessfully for a Habeas corpus on behalf of the one, and bail on behalf of the other. In the following year he was chosen as one of the counsels for the city of London on the motion of Sir Heneage Finch, then recorder, who was a close friend and connection by marriage. In 1629 he was one of the counsels for seven of the nine members of the House of Commons (including Sir John Eliot and Denzil Holles) who were then indicted for making seditious speeches in Parliament. Next year the Bishop of Ely (John Buckeridge) appointed him chief justice of his diocese, a position he held until his elevation to the king's bench. In 1632 (26 March) he was made queen's Serjeant, and two years later (8 July 1634) King's Serjeant, being knighted 24 November in the same year.

== Lord Chief Justice ==
On 14 April 1635, he was created Chief Justice of the King's Bench. In this position his first official act of historical importance was, in concert with the rest of the bench, to advise the king (13 February 1636/37) that he might lawfully levy Ship money, and that it belonged to the crown to decide when such levy ought to be made. Sir John's son informs us that his father was in favour of modifying this opinion in at least one essential particular: that he would have allowed the levy "during necessity only", and that he was only induced to subscribe to the opinion as it stood by the representation made "by the ancient judges that it was ever the use for all to subscribe to what was agreed by the majority".

In July of the same year, Bramston was a member of the Star Chamber tribunal which tried the Bishop of Lincoln on the charge of tampering with witnesses, and committing other misdemeanours. The bishop was found guilty by a unanimous verdict, and sentenced to be deprived of his office, to pay a fine of £10,000, and to be imprisoned at the king's pleasure. A similar sentence was passed on him at a later date, Bramston being again a member of the court, on a charge of libelling the Archbishop of Canterbury and the late lord treasurer Weston.

In the celebrated Ship money case (Rex v. Hampden), decided in the following year (12 June), Bramston gave his judgment against the king, though on a purely technical ground, viz. that by the record it did not appear to whom the money assessed was due, in that respect agreeing with the lord chief baron, Sir Humphry Davenport, who, with Brooke, Hutton, and Denham, also gave judgment in Hampden's favour; but taking care at the same time to signify his concurrence with the majority of the court upon the main question.

On 16 April 1640, during the indisposition of the lord keeper Finch, Bramston presided in the House of Lords.

On 21 December of the same year proceedings were commenced in the House of Commons to impeach the lord keeper Finch, Bramston, and five other of the judges who had subscribed the opinion on Ship money. The next day it was resolved that the message usual in such cases should be sent to the House of Lords. The message was communicated to the peers the same day, and the judges being present (except the lord keeper) were forthwith severally bound in recognisances of £10,000 to attend parliament from day to day until such time as a trial might be had. The lord keeper was bound to the same effect the following day. Bramston was thus unable to attend the king when required without rendering himself liable to immediate committal, and as no progress was made towards his trial, the king terminated so anomalous a condition of affairs by revoking his patent (10 October 1642), sending him shortly afterwards (10 February 1642–1643) a patent constituting him serjeant-at-law by way of assurance of his unbroken regard. Meanwhile, so far was the parliament from desiring to proceed to extremities with Bramston that in the terms of peace offered the king at Oxford (1 Feb 1642–1643) his reappointment as lord chief justice of the king's bench, not as formerly during the king's pleasure, but during good behaviour (quamdiu se bene gesserit), was included.

== Subsequent career ==
From this time forward until Bramston's death persistent attempts were made to induce him to declare definitely in favour of the parliament, but without success. In 1644, he was consulted by the leaders of the party as to the evidence necessary for the prosecution of Connor Maguire and Hugh Og MacMahon, two prisoners who had made their escape from the Tower of London and been retaken. In 1647, it was proposed to make him one of the commissioners of the great seal, and it was voted that he should sit as an assistant in the House of Lords, "which", says his son, "he did not absolutely deny, but avoided attending by the help of friends". In the same year, a resolution was come to that he should be appointed one of the judges of the Common Pleas. Even in the last year of his life Cromwell, then protector, sent for him privately, and was very urgent that he should again accept office as chief justice. Bramston, however, excused himself on the ground of his advanced age.

== Death ==
He died, after a short illness, in the seventy-eighth year of his age, 22 September 1654, at his manor of Skreens, in the parish of Roxwell, Essex, which he had bought in 1635 from Thomas Weston, the second son of Weston the lord treasurer. He was buried in Roxwell church. In-person he is described as of middle height, in youth slight and active, in later years stout without being corpulent. Fuller characterises him as "one of deep learning, solid judgment, integrity of life, and gravity of behaviour; in a word, accomplished with all the qualities requisite for a person of his place and profession". His son adds that he was "a very patient hearer of cases, free from passion and partiality, very modest in giving his opinion and judgment" (he seems to have shown a little too much of this quality on the occasion of the opinion on Ship money), "which he usually did with such reasons as often convinced those that differed from him and the auditory. Even the learned lawyers learned of him, as I have heard Twisden, Wild, Windham, and the admired Hales, and others acknowledge often".

== Private life ==
Bramston married in 1606 Bridget, daughter of Thomas Moundeford, M.D., son of Sir Edward Moundeford, knight, of Feltwell, Norfolk and his wife Mary Hill, by whom he had a large family, of whom six survived him, viz. three daughters, Dorothy, Mary, and Catherine, and as many sons: John; Moundeford, who was created a master in chancery at the Restoration; and Francis. Sir John, the son, describes his mother as "a beautiful, comely person of middle stature, virtuous and pious, a very observant wife, a careful, tender mother", "very charitable to the poor, kind to her neighbours, and beloved by them", and "much lamented by all that knew her". She died in the thirty-sixth year of her age (whilst John was still at school at Blackmore, Essex) in Phillip Lane, Aldermanbury, and was buried in a vault in St. Mary Magdalen, Milk Street. Sir John continued as a widower for some years, his wife's mother, Mary Moundeford, taking charge of his house.

In 1631 he remarried Elizabeth, daughter of Edward Brabazon, 1st Baron Ardee and Mary Smythe, sister of William Brabazon, 1st Earl of Meath, and relict of Sir John Brereton, King's Serjeant-at-law (Ireland). Brereton was her second husband, her first having been George Montgomery, Bishop of Clogher. Bramston's marriage with her was the revival of an old attachment which he had formed as a very young man, but which Lord Ardee had refused to countenance. The ceremony was performed at the seat of the Earl of Meath at Kilruddery House, near Dublin (Kilruddery is still the Brabazon family home). His son John, who accompanied Bramston to Ireland on this occasion, was by no means prepossessed by the appearance of his stepmother. "When I first saw her", he says, "I confess I wondered at my father's love. She was low, fat, red-faced; her dress, too, was a hat and ruff, which though she never changed to her death. But my father, I believe, seeing me change countenance, told me it was not beauty but virtue he courted. I believe she had been handsome in her youth; she had a delicate fine hand, white and plump, and indeed proved a good wife and mother-in-law too." She died in 1647, and was buried in Roxwell Church.
