= Chambré Brabazon, 5th Earl of Meath =

Irish nobleman and politician

Coat of Arms of the Earls of Meath

Chambré Brabazon, 5th Earl of Meath PC (I) (c. 1645 – 1 April 1715), styled Hon. Chambré Brabazon from 1652 to 1707, was an Irish nobleman and politician.

== Education and offices ==
He was the third son of Edward Brabazon, 2nd Earl of Meath, and Mary Chambré, daughter of Calcot Chambre, MP for Banbury, Oxfordshire, and Carnowe, County Wicklow, and his first wife, Mary Villiers. He was admitted to Trinity College Dublin, on 10 October 1667. He was the captain of a troop of horse in Ireland, and was Paymaster of Ireland in 1675. Between 1692 and 1695, he sat in the Irish House of Commons for County Dublin. He succeeded his brother Edward as Earl of Meath in 1707 and took his seat on 8 August 1709 in the Irish House of Lords. Meath was appointed Custos Rotulorum of Dublin in the same year, and named to the Privy Council of Ireland in 1710.

== Family ==
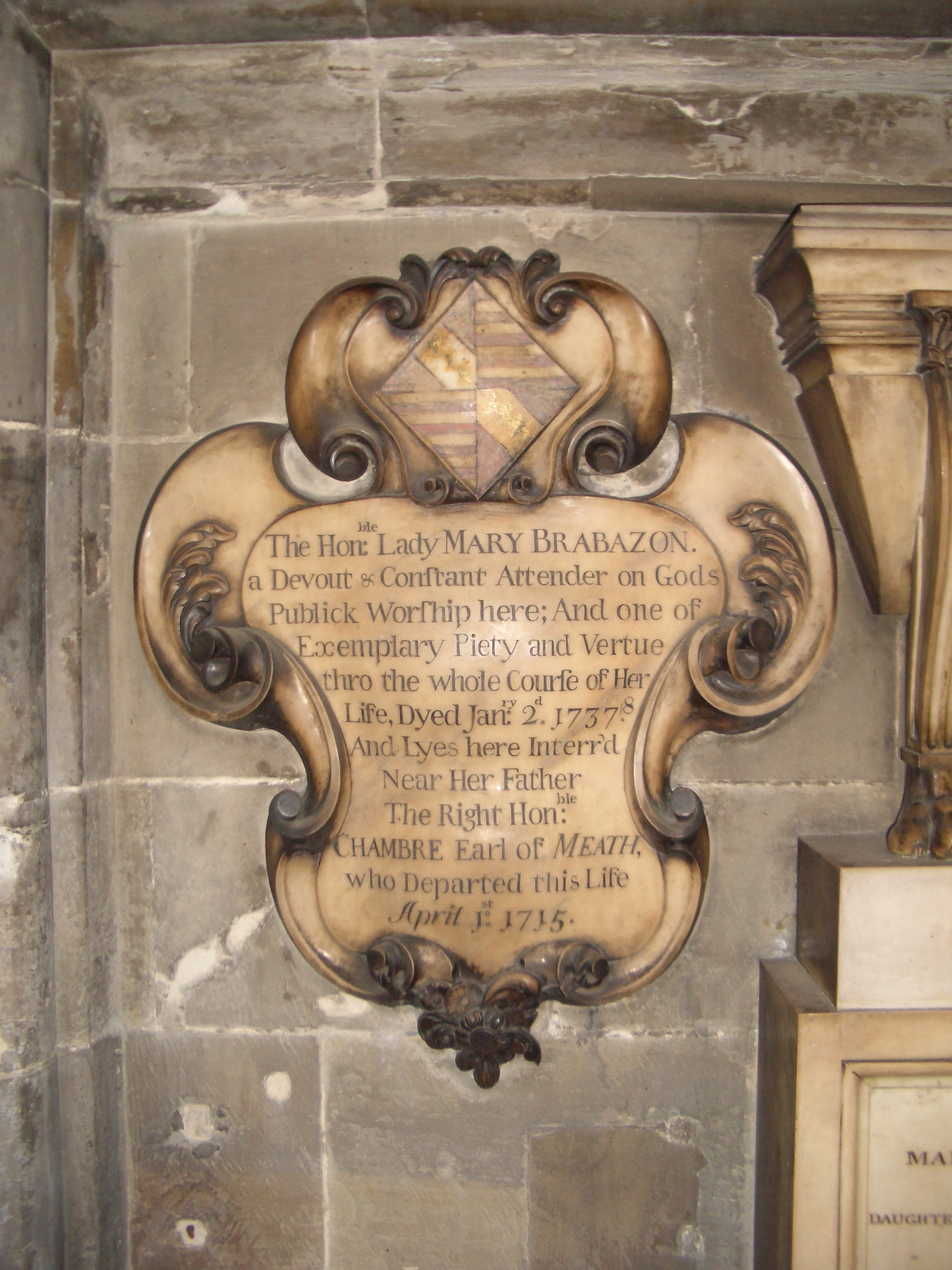
Memorial to Mary Brabazon in St. Mary's Church, Nottingham

In 1682, he married Juliana Chaworth (d. 12 November 1692), only daughter of Patrick Chaworth, 3rd Viscount Chaworth and Grace Manners, daughter of John Manners, 8th Earl of Rutland. They had seven children:

- Lady Mary Brabazon (1683–1738), buried in St. Mary's Church, Nottingham.
- Lady Juliana Brabazon (1684–1692).
- Lady Catharine Brabazon (1686–1742), married Thomas Hallowes of Bolsover and had issue.
- Chaworth Brabazon, 6th Earl of Meath (1687–1763).
- Lady Frances Brabazon (1688–1751), married Maj-Gen. Hon. Henry Ponsonby (d. 1745, at the Battle of Fontenoy) and had issue.
- Hon. Chambré Brabazon (died young, 1691)
- Edward Brabazon, 7th Earl of Meath (1691–1772)

He died in Nottingham and was buried in St. Mary's Church, Nottingham on 2 April 1715.

Parliament of Ireland
Preceded by Simon Luttrell; Patrick Sarsfield	Member of Parliament for County Dublin; 1692–1695; With: John Allen	Succeeded by Robert Molesworth; Edward Deane
Peerage of Ireland
Preceded by Edward Brabazon	Earl of Meath; 1707–1715	Succeeded by Chaworth Brabazon
Preceded by Edward Brabazon	Baron Ardee (descended by acceleration); 1707–1714	Succeeded by Chaworth Brabazon
