= Barbazan =

Barbazan may refer to:

- Arnaud Guillaume de Barbazan, counsellor to Charles VII of France
- Édouard Barbazan (1902–1986), was a French athlete
- Barbazan, Haute-Garonne, France

== See also ==
- Brabazon (disambiguation)
