= Custos Rotulorum of County Dublin =

This is a list of people who have served as Custos Rotulorum of County Dublin. Custos rotulorum (plural: custodes rotulorum; Latin for "keeper of the rolls") is a civic post which is recognised in some English-speaking jurisdictions. The position was later combined with that of Lord Lieutenant of Dublin.

- 1661–1671 William St Lawrence, 12th Baron Howth
- 1671–?1685 William Brabazon, 3rd Earl of Meath (died 1685)
- 1685–? Edward Brabazon, 4th Earl of Meath (died 1707)
- ?1709–1715 Chambre Brabazon, 5th Earl of Meath
- 1789–1821 Henry Lawes Luttrell, 2nd Earl of Carhampton
- 1821–1822 Hans Hamilton
- 1823–1857 Sir Compton Domvile, 1st Baronet
- 1874–1892 Charles Stanley Monck, 4th Viscount Monck

== See also ==
- For later custodes rotulorum, see Lord Lieutenant of Dublin
