= Sir Thomas Domvile, 1st Baronet =

Sir Thomas Domvile, 1st Baronet (c.1655 – 15 April 1721) was an Anglo-Irish politician.

He was the son of Sir William Domville (1609–1689) and Brigid Lake, the daughter of Sir Thomas Lake.

On 21 December 1686, Domvile was created a baronet, of Templeogue in the Baronetage of Ireland. He was granted the forfeited manor of the Jacobite the late James Talbot at Templeogue in 1694. He was the Member of Parliament for Mullingar in the Irish House of Commons between 1692 and 1693. His first wife (and cousin) Elizabeth Lake, was the daughter of Sir Lancelot Lake, their daughter, Bridget, married Henry Barry, 3rd Baron Barry of Santry. He was succeeded in his title by his son, Compton Domvile from his second wife Anna Domville (née Compton), with Anna he also had a daughter Elizabeth Pocklington (Domville), the mother of Charles Pocklington-Domvile.

He married for a third time Frances Cole the daughter of Sir John Cole of Enniskillen.

Parliament of Ireland
Preceded by Garrett Dillon; Edmond Nugent	Member of Parliament for Mullingar; 1692–1693; With: Roger Moore	Succeeded by Roger Moore; Patrick Dun
Baronetage of Ireland
New title	Baronet (of Templeogue); 1686–1721	Succeeded by Compton Domvile
