= George Montgomery (bishop) =

Scottish bishop

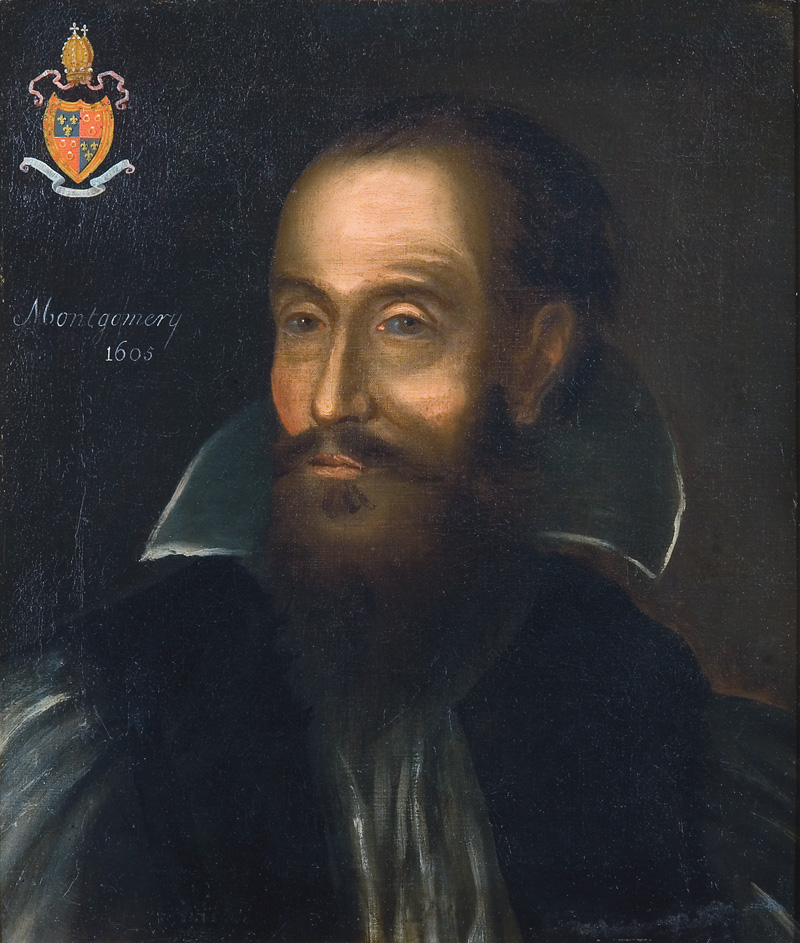
- 1605 portrait of Montgomery
- Church: Church of Ireland

Personal details
- Born: c. 1569 Ayrshire, Scotland
- Died: January 1621 (aged 51) Westminster, England
- Buried: Ardbraccan, County Meath, Ireland

Arms of Montgomerie: Azure, three fleurs-de-lys or

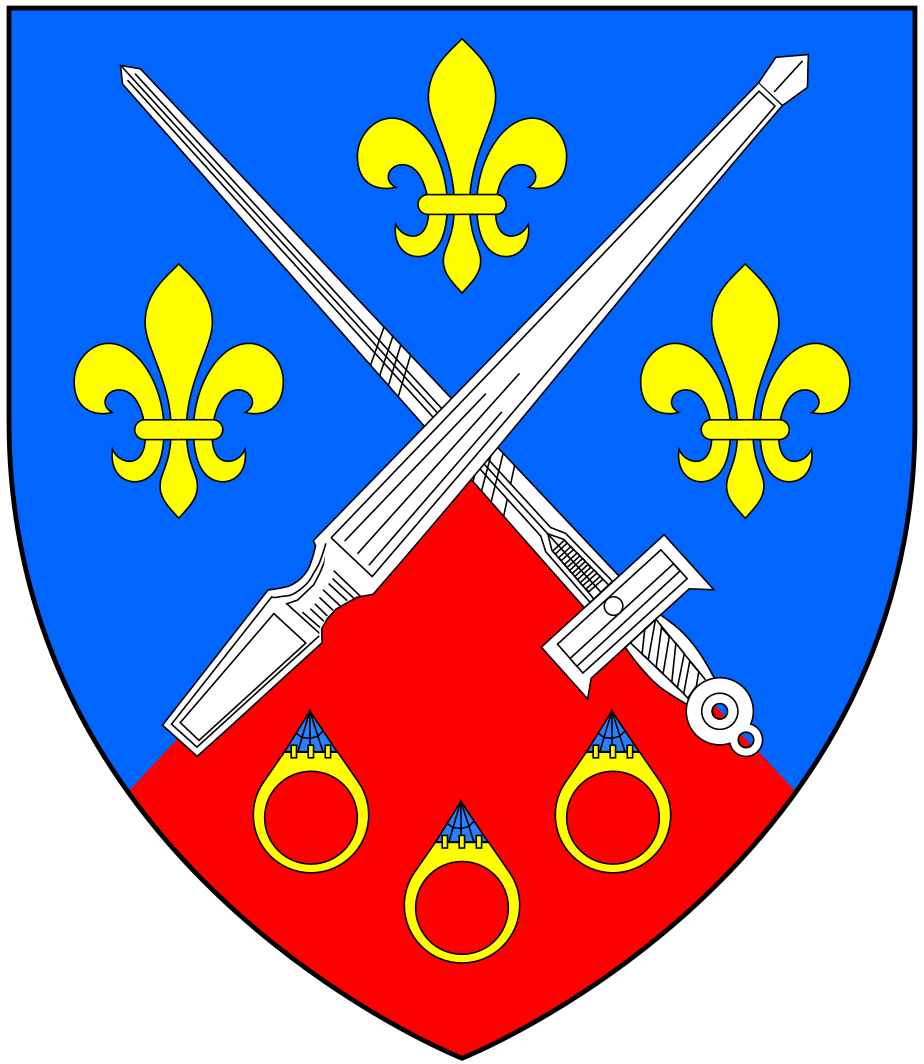
Composite arms of George Montgomery, as shown on the monumental brass mural monument in Washfield Church, Devon, erected by him in memory of his mother-in-law Alice Fry (died 1605).

George Montgomery (alias Montgomerie; c. 1569 – January 1621) was a Scottish Protestant cleric, promoted by King James VI and I to various Irish bishoprics. He held the offices of Rector of Chedzoy, Somerset; Dean of Norwich (1603); Bishop of Raphoe, Bishop of Clogher, Bishop of Derry (1605); and Bishop of Meath (1610).

== Life ==
He was born in North Ayrshire, the second son of Adam Montgomery, 5th Laird of Braidstane, and brother of Hugh Montgomery, 1st Viscount Montgomery, who used his influence on George's behalf. Their mother Margaret Montgomery of Hessilhead was a cousin. After James I had made him Dean of Norwich in 1603, he was appointed the first Protestant Bishop of Raphoe, in 1605. There he began the reconstruction of The Cathedral Church of St. Eunan. At the same time he was made Bishop of Clogher and Bishop of Derry; and in 1607 lobbied Lord Salisbury for the establishment of free schools in Ulster. His translation to these remote Irish sers did not greatly please him, nor his wife, who referred with bewilderment to the King's gift of "three Irish dioceses whose names I cannot remember, they are so strange".

In 1608, when O'Doherty's Rebellion broke out in Ulster, the settlement of Derry was captured and burnt by the rebels led by Sir Cathaoir Ruadh Ó Dochartaigh (Sir Cahir Rua O'Doherty). Although Bishop Montgomery and Ó Dochartaigh had been on good terms before the rising (both had quarrelled with Sir George Paulet, the Governor of Derry, who is often blamed for provoking the rebellion), the rebels burnt the Bishop's house and his library of two thousand books because of their supposedly heretical content. The Bishop's wife and sister were taken as hostages by the rebels, but were eventually freed by Crown forces.

From 1609, he assisted in the plantation of Scots in western Ulster. Though he was frequently accused, even by the Crown itself, of neglecting his pastoral duties, he was a fine administrator and an astute man of business. He did much to strengthen the Church of Ireland in Ulster, and accumulated a comfortable private fortune, which passed by marriage to the St Lawrence family.

From 1610 he was Bishop of Meath, retaining the Norwich deanery to 1614, and the Raphoe bishopric for the rest of his life. Montgomery was also rector of Chedzoy.

After his death in London in 1620/21, his body was taken back to Ireland and buried at Ardbraccan Church, near Navan in County Meath.

== Marriage and children ==
He married twice:

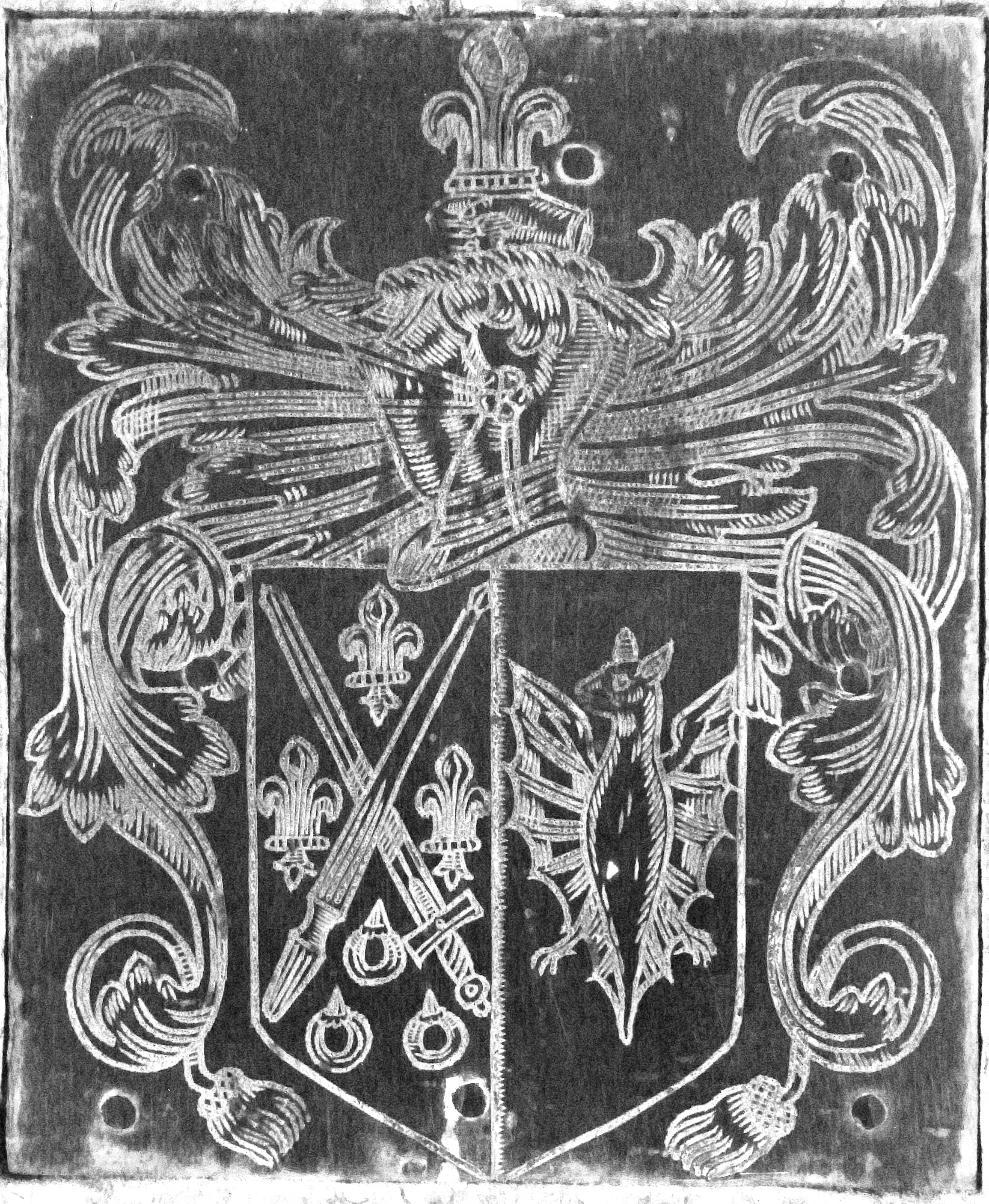
Arms of George Montgomery impaling Steyning, 1605 monumental brass, Washfield Church, Devon. The crest of Montgomery is shown on a helm above: A dexter hand couped holding a fleur-de-lys

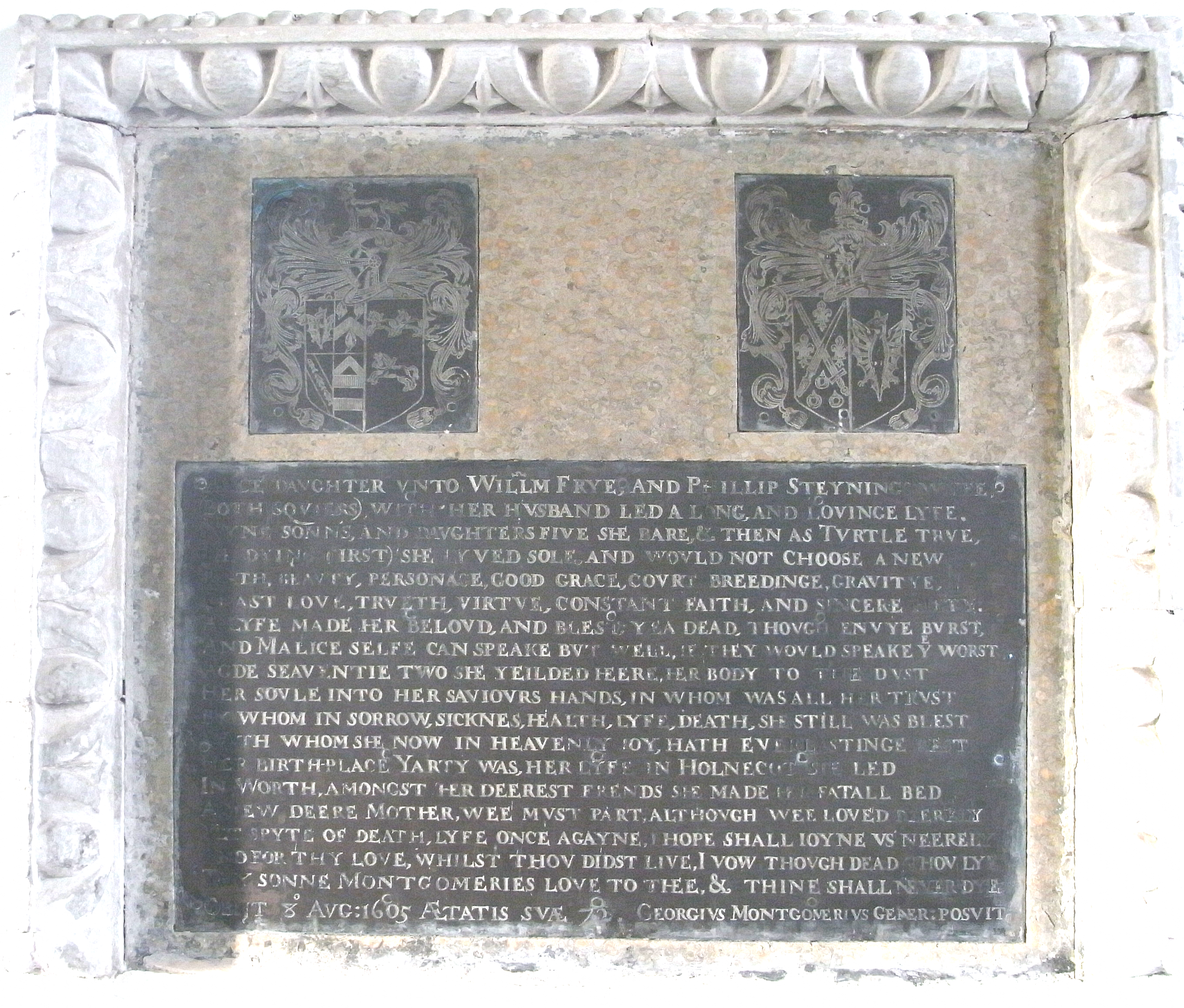
Monumental brass mural monument in Washfield Church, Devon, erected by Montgomery in memory of his mother-in-law Alice Fry (died 1605). His arms are shown on the escutcheon at sinister, impaling Steyning: Argent, a bat displayed sable.

- Firstly to Susan Steyning (died 1614), the eldest daughter of Phillip Steyning (1509–1589), lord of the manor of Holnicote in Somerset, by his wife Alice Fry (1533–1605), a daughter of William Fry, lord of the manor of Yarty in Devon. Montgomery erected a monumental brass tablet in Washfield Church in Devon to his mother-in-law Alice Fry, on which are engraved his arms impaling Steyning. It comprises a lengthy rhyming verse on the lady's good moral character, composed by Montgomery. Susan Steyning's younger sister Margaret Steyning married John Willoughby of Payhembury in Devon, with whom Montgomery frequently corresponded. The correspondence was preserved by Willoughby's granddaughter Mary Willoughby, the wife of George Trevelyan, lord of the manor of Nettlecombe in Somerset, which collection is now known as the Trevelyan Papers. These provide an important source for the biography of Montgomery. By his wife Susan Steyning he had children as follows:
  - Jane Montgomery, their only daughter, who in 1618 married The 11th Baron Howth, whose family her father described as "a noble house, the best of the Pale of Ireland". Montgomery provided her with a dowry of £3,000, a considerable sum at the time. Though not a love marriage it was apparently a happy one. They had seven children, of whom one son and four daughters reached adulthood.
- Secondly he married Elizabeth Brabazon, daughter of The 1st Baron Ardee and Mary Smythe, and sister of The 1st Earl of Meath. After his death, she made two further marriages: to Sir John Brereton, Serjeant-at-law (Ireland), and finally to Sir John Bramston, the Lord Chief Justice. This last marriage was the outcome of a longstanding attachment: her father had forbidden them to marry, but her brother, Lord Meath, made no objection. She died in 1647. Her stepchildren remembered her fondly as a good wife and kindly stepmother, but not as someone for whom they would expect their father to cherish a long romantic attachment, being short, fat, red-faced and badly dressed.

== Character ==
He was praised in his time as "no lazy bishop nor idle patriot" and was called the "darling and chief advocate of the Church of Ireland". He was also noted for his loyalty to his brother, Lord Montgomery, his "best and closest friend".
