= William Brabazon (Lord Justice of Ireland) =

English-born Irish soldier and statesman (died 1552)

Sir William Brabazon (died 1552) was an English-born Irish soldier and statesman. He held office as Vice-Treasurer of Ireland and Lord Justice of Ireland. His descendants still hold the title Earl of Meath.

Brabazon was descended from the family of Roger le Brabazon, and was the son of John Brabazon of Eastwell, Leicestershire; his mother was a Miss Chaworth. His grandfather, John Brabazon the elder, had been killed at the Battle of Bosworth.

== Life ==
After succeeding to his father's estates, he came to Court. He was present at the Field of the Cloth of Gold in 1520, where he gained royal favour through his skill in jousting. He was knighted on 20 August 1534, and appointed Vice-Treasurer and General Receiver of Ireland. He sat in the Irish House of Commons in the Parliament of 1536–7.

In a letter from the Lord Chief Justice of Ireland, Gerald Aylmer to Thomas Cromwell in August 1535 he was described as "the man that prevented the total ruin and desolation of the Kingdom". In 1536, he and John Barnewall, 3rd Baron Trimlestown beat back an assault by the O'Connor clan on Carbury by burning several villages in Offaly and carrying away great spoil. The next year he made so effective a speech in support of establishing the King's authority in opposition to that of the Pope that he persuaded the Parliament of Ireland to pass the two requisite Acts, the Act of Appeals 1537 and the Act Authorising the King, his Heirs and Successors to be Supreme Head of the Church of Ireland 1537.

As a result of this, many religious houses were in 1539 surrendered to King Henry VIII. Brabazon himself was granted the lands of the Abbey of St Thomas, between present-day Thomas Street in Dublin and the River Liffey: here he built his townhouse Thomas Court. The Abbey's lands included Kilruddery, which later became, and remains, the family's principal seat.

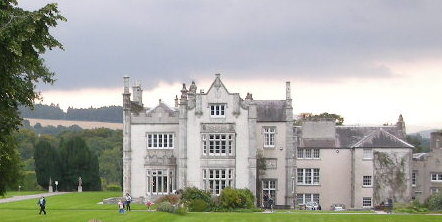
Kilruddery House, home of Brabazon's descendants, the Earls of Meath, present day

For his good services to the Crown he was, on 1 October 1543, constituted Lord Justice of Ireland, and he was again appointed to the same office on 1 April 1546.

In the same year, he drove Patrick O'More and Brian O'Connor from Kildare. In April 1547 he was elected a member of the Privy Council of Ireland. In the spring of 1548 he assisted the Lord Deputy of Ireland in subduing a rebellion raised in Kildare by the sons of Thomas Eustace, 1st Viscount Baltinglass. He was for the third time made Lord Justice on 2 February 1549.

In August 1550, he subdued Cahir mac Art Kavanagh, head of the powerful MacMurrough-Kavanagh dynasty and the dominant Gaelic magnate in Leinster. Cahir, after making submission and renouncing his Irish title The MacMurrough, received a royal pardon, and the new title Baron of Ballyann.

== Death ==
Brabazon died, while on military service, on 9 July 1552 (as is proved by the inquisitions taken in the year of his death), not in 1548 as recorded on his tombstone. His heart was buried with his ancestors at Eastwell, and his body in the chancel of St. Catherine's Church, Dublin.

== Family ==
By his wife Elizabeth Clifford, daughter and co-heiress of Sir Nicholas Clifford of Holme, Kent, and his wife Mary Harper, sister of Sir George Harper, he left two sons and two daughters, Anne, who married Andrew Wise, and Elizabeth, who married Sir Henry Duke of Castlejordan and had two daughters. His eldest son, Edward, was made a Baron in 1616, while his paternal grandson was William Brabazon, 1st Earl of Meath.

His younger son, Anthony, founded another branch of the family whose main seat was at Ballinasloe Castle, County Galway. Elizabeth, despite her apparent lack of Irish connections, chose to remain in Ireland after his death. She outlived William by many years (dying in 1581), and remarried no less than three times. Her children by her later marriages included the distinguished soldier Sir William Warren, and Garret Moore, 1st Viscount Moore.

== Arms ==
Coat of arms of Brabazon of Eastwell
Escutcheon Gules, on a bend Or, three martlets Sable. Supporters Dexter, a lamb murally crowned, in the mouth an olive branch, supporting the banner of Jerusalem; sinister, a tiger guard, navally crowned, in the mouth a palm branch, supporting the Union flag of Great Britain, with the inscription, 'Jerusalem, 1799' upon the cross of St. George.
