= John Brereton (lawyer) =

English-born lawyer in Ireland

Sir John Brereton
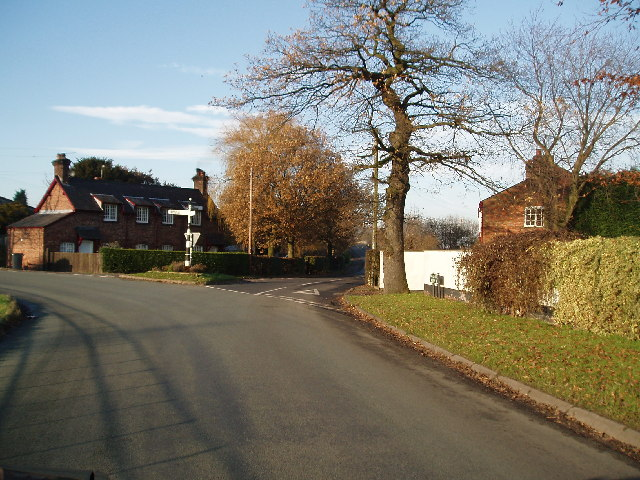
- Ashley, Cheshire, Brereton's birthplace
- Born: 1576; Ashley, Cheshire
- Died: 1629 (aged 52–53)
- Occupation: lawyer
- Known for: Irish Prime Serjeant with a knighthood

Sir John Brereton (1576–1629) was an English-born lawyer who held office in Ireland as serjeant-at-law.

He was born in Ashley, Cheshire, one of the eight sons of George Brereton of Ashley Hall and Sybil Arderne, daughter of William Arderne of Timperley, near Altrincham. The Breretons were descended from Sir William Brereton, who was Earl Marshal of Ireland in the time of Henry VIII. John was baptised at the parish church in Bowdon on 20 June 1576. He attended Sidney Sussex College, Cambridge, of which he was later a generous benefactor. He practised as an attorney for some years and was then called to the Bar at the Inner Temple in 1609. He moved to Ireland and was admitted to the King's Inn in 1613.

He was appointed the Irish Prime Serjeant in 1617, with a knighthood, and served in that office until his death on 1 October 1629. He was the first holder of the office to be called Prime Serjeant, rather than by the older title of King's Serjeant. The reason for the change of title was the creation in 1627 of the new office of Second Serjeant.

In his will he left a generous bequest to Sidney Sussex College, and divided the remainder of his estate between his wife Elizabeth and his brother Randal. Elizabeth was the widow of George Montgomery, Bishop of Meath: she was the daughter of Edward Brabazon, 1st Baron Ardee and his wife Mary Smythe, and sister of William Brabazon, 1st Earl of Meath.In 1631 she remarried Sir John Bramston, the Lord Chief Justice of England.She and Bramston had been in love when they were young, but her father had forbidden the marriage.Her Bramston stepchildren described her appearance unflatteringly in her middle years as small, fat, red-faced and homely. On the other hand, they praised her as a good wife and a kindly stepmother. She died in 1647.
