= Garret Moore, 1st Viscount Moore =

Anglo-Irish politician and peer

Garret Moore, 1st Viscount Moore PC (I) (c.1564 – 9 November 1627) was an Anglo-Irish politician and peer.

== Birth and origins ==
Garret was a son of Sir Edward Moore of Mellifont and his wife Elizabeth Clifford. His father was a knight and owner of the former abbey of Mellifont in County Louth. Garrett's mother was daughter and co-heiress of Nicholas Clifford of Sutton Valence and Bobbing, Kent, and his wife Mary Harper, sister of Sir George Harper. Elizabeth had already been married three times: all her husbands belonged to the Anglo-Irish nobility: her first husband, Sir William Brabazon, had been Lord Justice of Ireland. Through this marriage, Garrett was a half-brother of Edward Brabazon, 1st Baron Ardee. Through his mother's third marriage, which was to Captain Humphrey Warren, he was the half-brother of Sir William Warren.

== Early career ==
In 1599, after his father's death in 1581, Garret was knighted by Elizabeth I. He held the office of Seneschal of Cavan in 1601. He inherited his father's very substantial estates in 1602. Much of these were leasehold, held directly from the English Crown. He was a staunch friend of Hugh O'Neill, Earl of Tyrone, and hosted the negotiations that led to the Treaty of Mellifont in 1603 and the ending of the Nine Years' War.

== Moore and the Earl of Tyrone ==
Despite his friendship with the Earl of Tyrone, his loyalty to the Crown was never seriously in doubt. However, after Tyrone's flight to the Continent in 1607, he was the target of vehement attacks by his enemies, especially the volatile and unreliable Christopher St Lawrence, 10th Baron Howth, with whom he had quarrelled bitterly, despite being related to him by marriage. Lord Howth accused Moore of treasonable dealings with Tyrone, and pressed the charges with such vigour that the Lord Lieutenant of Ireland, Sir Arthur Chichester, who had originally laughed at them as "too absurd even to charge a horse-boy with, let alone a knight", felt obliged to place Moore under house arrest. Moore admitted that on the eve of the Flight of the Earls, Tyrone had visited him at his home, Mellifont, but he firmly denied any imputation of treason. Lord Howth, summoned before the Irish Council, refused to produce any evidence of the alleged treason, on the ground that since Moore was himself a Privy Councillor, that body was clearly guilty of bias, while his bizarre claim that he had seen Moore trying to raise the Devil did nothing to enhance his credibility. The case was transferred to England, and in due course, Moore was cleared of all suspicion. Howth, undaunted, now accused Chichester and Moore of conspiring to murder him: the Council, which by now lost had all patience with Howth, ordered him to retire to his home in disgrace. Moore by contrast was assured that his loyalty to the King was not in question.

== Later career ==
Moore was made a member of the Privy Council of Ireland in 1604 and served in the Irish House of Commons as the Member of Parliament for Dungannon in the Parliament of 1613-15. He held the office of Lord President of Munster in 1615. On 20 July 1616 he was created Baron Moore, of Mellifont in the County of Louth in the Peerage of Ireland. He was further honoured when he was created Viscount Moore, of Drogheda, also in the Peerage of Ireland, on 7 February 1621. His principal residence was Mellifont Abbey, near Drogheda, which remained in the Moore family until 1927: it is now a ruin.

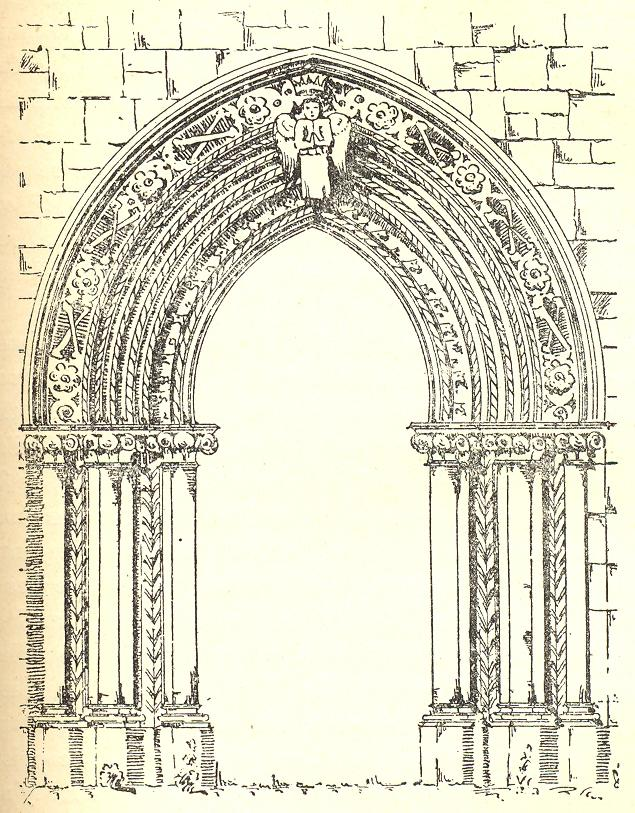
Mellifont Abbey, c.1755

== Marriage and children ==
He married Mary Colley, daughter of Sir Henry Colley and his wife Catherine Cusack, daughter of Sir Thomas Cusack, Lord Chancellor of Ireland, by whom he had twelve children, three sons and nine daughters:

The couple had seven sons:

1. Edward, who predeceased his father;
2. Thomas, who predeceased his father;
3. Charles, who succeeded as the 2nd Viscount;
4. James;
5. Arthur (died 1635), married Dorothy King, daughter of Sir John King of Boyle Abbey, and had issue;
6. Francis;
7. John.

—and five daughters:

1. Ursula, who married Sir Nicholas White of Leixlip in County Kildare;
2. Frances, who married Roger Jones, 1st Viscount Ranelagh;
3. Anne, who married the prominent Royalist commander Sir Faithful Fortescue;
4. Eleanor, who married Sir John Denham, Lord Chief Justice of Ireland, best known to history as one of the Ship Money judges: they were the parents of the distinguished poet Sir John Denham; and
5. Jane, who married Henry Blayney, 2nd Baron Blayney.

Moore's grandson, Henry Moore, was created Earl of Drogheda in 1661.

Moore's widow Mary remarried Charles Wilmot, 1st Viscount Wilmot: she died in 1654, and was buried beside her first husband in St. Peter's Church, Drogheda.

== Sources ==
- Burke, Bernard (1949), A Genealogical and Heraldic Dictionary of the Peerage and Baronetage of the British Empire (99th ed.), London: Burke's Peerage Ltd.
- Cokayne, George Edward (1916), Gibbs, Vicary (ed.), The complete peerage of England, Scotland, Ireland, Great Britain and the United Kingdom, extant, extinct, or dormant, vol. 4 (2nd ed.), London: St Catherine Press - DACRE to DYSART (for Drogheda)
- Dunlop, Robert (1894). "Moore, Garret" . In Lee, Sidney (ed.). Dictionary of National Biography. Vol. 38. London: Smith, Elder & Co.
- Lodge, John (1789), The Peerage of Ireland, vol. 2, Dublin: James Moore - Earls (for Drogheda)
- O'Sullivan, Harold. "Moore, Garret, first Viscount Moore of Drogheda (1565/6–1627)date= 2004". Oxford Dictionary of National Biography (online ed.). Oxford University Press. doi:10.1093/ref:odnb/19110. (Subscription, Wikipedia Library access or UK public library membership required.)

Parliament of Ireland
Preceded by	Member of Parliament for Dungannon; 1613–1615; With: Sir Hugh Pollerde	Succeeded by Sir Faithful Fortescue; John Perkins
Peerage of Ireland
New creation	Viscount Moore; 1621–1627	Succeeded by Charles Moore
New creation	Baron Moore; 1616–1627	Succeeded by Charles Moore
