= Edward Brabazon, 1st Baron Ardee =

Anglo-Irish peer

Edward Brabazon, 1st Baron Ardee (c. 1548 – 7 August 1625) was an Anglo-Irish peer.

Brabazon was the eldest son of Sir William Brabazon (died 1552), the Lord Justice of the Kingdom of Ireland, and Elizabeth Clifford (died 1581). His mother was the daughter and co-heiress of Nicholas Clifford of Holme in Kent and Mary Harper, sister of Sir George Harper. She was a much married lady, and Edward as a result had numerous half-siblings, including the distinguished soldier Sir William Warren, and Garret Moore, 1st Viscount Moore.

A younger son of Sir William, Sir Anthony Brabazon, settled in County Galway and County Roscommon and founded a junior branch of the family. He married Ursula Malby, daughter of Sir Nicholas Malby, governor of Connacht. Ballinasloe Castle, built by a Hiberno-Norman knight in the 13th century, was granted by Queen Elizabeth to Sir Nicholas Malby. Sir Anthony took up residence in the Castle, holding it in fee by knight's service.

Edward grew up at Thomas Court, near present-day Thomas Street in Dublin city, where his father had built a house out of the lands of the former Abbey of St Thomas the Martyr, which were granted to him after the Dissolution of the Monasteries. The Abbey's lands included Killruddery, near Bray, County Wicklow. The building of the original Kilruddery House seems to have begun in Edward's later years: Kilruddery is still the family home, although no trace of the original house survives. He occupied Ballinasloe castle in the 1570s/80s, on land previously held by Seán na Maighe Ó Cellaigh.

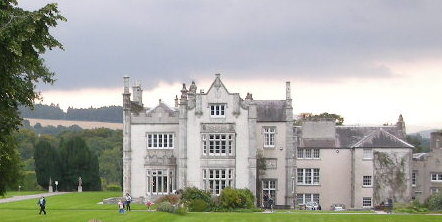
Kilruddery House, present day

He was made a member of the Privy Council of Ireland in 1584. In 1585, he was elected as Member of Parliament for County Wicklow in the Irish House of Commons. He was knighted on 24 August 1595. Brabazon was High Sheriff of Staffordshire in 1606 and served as MP for Bangor between 1613 and 1615. He was a member of the Council of Munster in 1615. On 19 July 1616, he was created Baron Ardee in the Peerage of Ireland and took his seat in the Irish House of Lords.

== Family ==
Edward Brabazon married Mary Smythe, the daughter of Thomas Smythe Esq. of Surrey, Clerk of the Green Cloth to Elizabeth I and his wife Eleanor Hazelrigg, and together they had at least six children. His eldest son predeceased him and his second son, William, was made Earl of Meath in 1627.

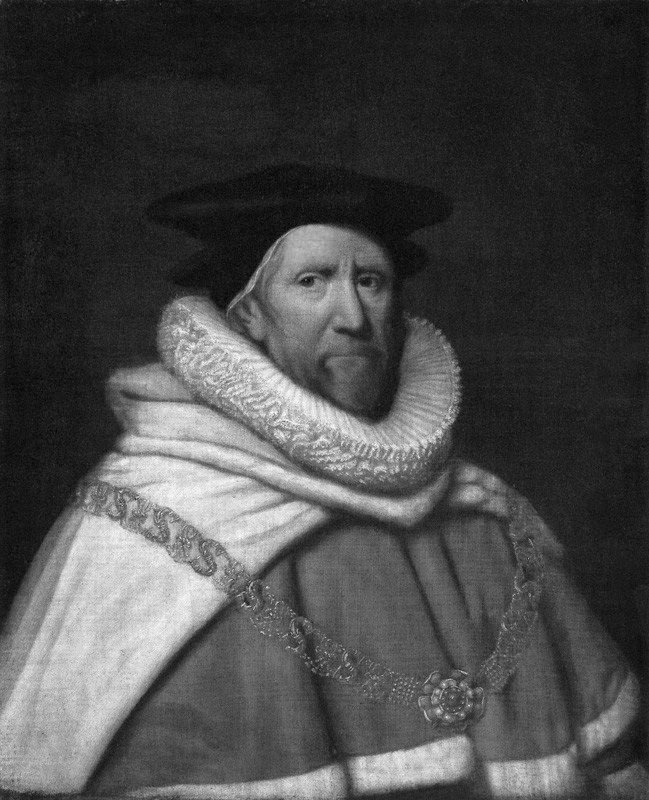
John Bramston the Elder, the third husband of Brabazon's daughter Elizabeth

He had at least three daughters (there are thought to have been others who died young):

- Elizabeth (died 1647) who married as his second wife George Montgomery, Bishop of Meath. After his death she remarried Sir John Brereton, the King's Serjeant-at-law (Ireland). Finally, in 1631 she married her early sweetheart, Sir John Bramston, the Lord Chief Justice. Her father, when they were young, had forbidden them to marry but her brother evidently approved of the match, which was celebrated at Kilruderry. Her stepchildren were rather perturbed to learn that their father had cherished a lifelong romantic attachment to Elizabeth, whom they described as being a small, fat, red-faced, middle-aged woman, but they quickly came to appreciate her many virtues.
- Susannah (died before 1628) who married Luke Plunkett, 1st Earl of Fingall and had issue.
- Ursula (died 1625) who married James Hamilton, 1st Viscount Clandeboye; they divorced c.1615.

Peerage of Ireland
New creation	Baron Ardee; 1616–1625	Succeeded by William Brabazon
