= Edward Brabazon =

Edward Brabazon may refer to:

- Edward Brabazon, 1st Baron Ardee (c.1548–1625), Anglo-Irish peer
- Edward Brabazon, 7th Earl of Meath (1691–1772), Anglo-Irish peer
