= John Brabazon =

John Brabazon may refer to:

- John Brabazon, 15th Earl of Meath (born 1941), Anglo-Irish peer
- John Brabazon, 10th Earl of Meath (1772–1851), Anglo-Irish peer

== See also ==
- John Moore-Brabazon, 1st Baron Brabazon of Tara (1884–1964), English aviation pioneer and politician
