= List of lords lieutenant of County Dublin =

Ceremonial officer in Dublin, Ireland

This is a list of those who have held the post of Lord Lieutenant of County Dublin.

There were lieutenants of counties in Ireland until the reign of James II, when they were renamed governors. The office of Lord Lieutenant was recreated on 23 August 1831. The title is pronounced as 'Lord Lef-tenant'.

== Governors ==
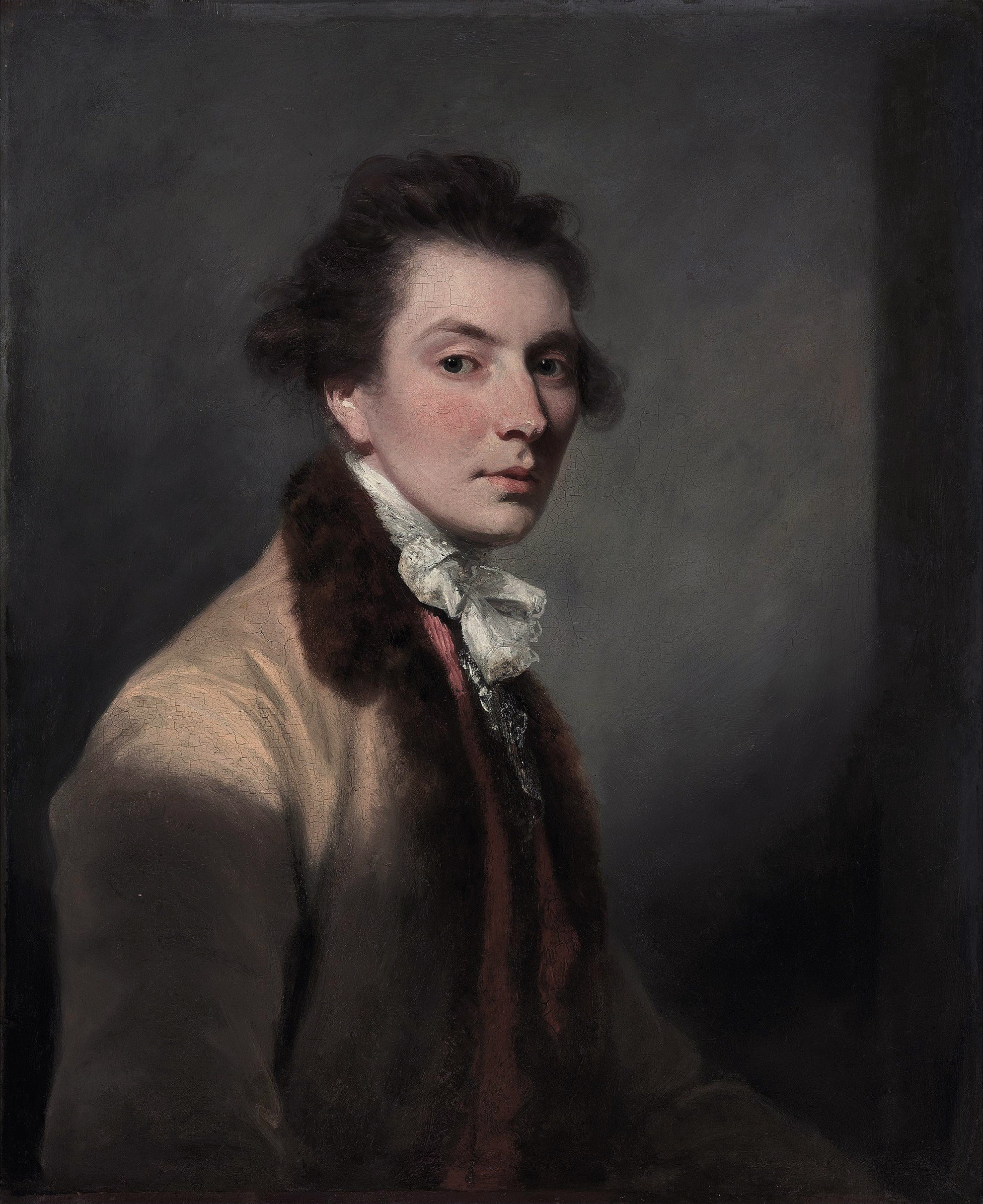
Luke Gardiner, 1st Viscount Mountjoy

- Nicholas Barnewall, 1st Viscount Barnewall: 1641– (died 1663)
- Simon Luttrell: 1687–1690 (1643–1698) (Jacobite)
- Edward Brabazon, 4th Earl of Meath: 1699– (died 1707)
- Chaworth Brabazon, 6th Earl of Meath: (died 1763)
- Luke Gardiner, 1st Viscount Mountjoy: (died 1798)
- Thomas St Lawrence, 1st Earl of Howth: (died 1801)
- Henry Lawes Luttrell, 2nd Earl of Carhampton: 1792–1821
- George Vesey: 1803 –1831
- Hans Hamilton: 1813–1822
- Thomas White –1831:
- Sir Compton Domvile, 1st Baronet: 1822–1831

== Lord Lieutenants ==
- John Brabazon, 10th Earl of Meath: 7 October 1831 – 15 March 1851
- Thomas St Lawrence, 3rd Earl of Howth: 7 April 1851 – 4 February 1874
- Charles Monck, 4th Viscount Monck: 9 March 1874 – August 1892
- Ion Hamilton, 1st Baron HolmPatrick: 11 August 1892 – 6 March 1898
- Reginald Brabazon, 12th Earl of Meath: 12 May 1898 – 1922
