= County Dublin (Parliament of Ireland constituency) =

Pre-1801 Irish constituency

- Former county constituency for the Irish House of Commons
- County: County Dublin

–1801
- Seats: 2
- Replaced by: County Dublin (UKHC)

County Dublin was a constituency represented in the Irish House of Commons until its abolition in 1801.

== History ==
County Dublin was represented by two MPs in the Irish House of Commons. It had a comparatively low electorate of c. 1,200 to 1,500 voters around the time of the Union. The parliamentary boroughs of Dublin City, Newcastle and Swords had separate representation, as did Dublin University, which was located in the city.

The Irish House of Commons was abolished on 1 January 1801 under the Acts of Union 1800. The constituency was succeeded by the Westminster constituency of County Dublin, remaining as a two-seat constituency.

== Members of Parliament ==
=== Parliaments of Henry V ===
- 1420 Stephen Houthe and Richard Tyrelle

=== Parliaments of Henry VIII ===
- 1536 Patrick Barnewall

=== Parliaments of Elizabeth I ===
- 1568 Sir Christopher Barnewall
- 1585 Richard Netterville
- 1585 Henry Burnell
- 1585 Nicholas Ball

=== Parliaments of James I ===
- 1613 Sir Christopher Plunket
- 1613 Thomas Luttrell of Luttrellstown

=== Parliaments of Charles I ===
- 1634 Nicholas Barnewall and Thomas Luttrell (died and replaced by Peter Barnewall)
- 1639 Nicholas Barnewall (ennobled 1647 and replaced by Sir Thomas Armstrong) and Peter Barnewall (expelled for non-attendance - replaced 1642 by Sir John Sherlock)

=== Protectorate Parliament ===
- 1654–55: John Hewson
- 1656–58: John Bysse
- 1659: Sir Theophilus Jones

=== Charles II ===
- 1661 Sir William Domville and Sir William Ussher

=== 1692–1801 ===
Election	First MP		Second MP	
1689	Simon Luttrell		Patrick Sarsfield	
1692	John Allen		Chambre Brabazon	
1695	Robert Molesworth	Whig	Edward Deane	
1703	John Allen		Joseph Deane	
1713	Lord Brabazon		Joseph Deane	
1715	Hon. Edward Brabazon		John Allen	
1717	Hon. Edward Brabazon		William Domvile	
1727	Hon. Edward Brabazon		Sir Compton Domvile, 2nd Bt	
1761	Anthony Brabazon (Note: Styled as Lord Ardee from 1763.)		Sir Compton Domvile, 2nd Bt	
April 1768	Anthony Brabazon		Charles Domvile	
August 1768	Anthony Brabazon		Joseph Deane	
1773	Luke Gardiner		Joseph Deane	
1776	Luke Gardiner		Sir Edward Newenham	Patriot
1789	Lord Ardee		Sir Edward Newenham	Independent
February 1790	John Finlay		Sir Edward Newenham	Independent
May 1790	Richard Wogan Talbot (Note: Declared not duly elected in 1790.)		Sir Edward Newenham	Independent
1791	John Finlay		Sir Edward Newenham	Independent
1798	Hans Hamilton		Frederick John Falkiner	
1801	Succeeded by the Westminster constituency County Dublin			

== Bibliography ==
- Richardson, Henry Gerald; Sayles, George Osborne (1947). Parliaments And Councils Of Mediaeval Ireland (PDF). Vol. 1. Dublin: Stationery Office. p. xxx (38/308).
