= Luke Gardiner, 1st Viscount Mountjoy =

Irish landowner and politician

Luke Gardiner
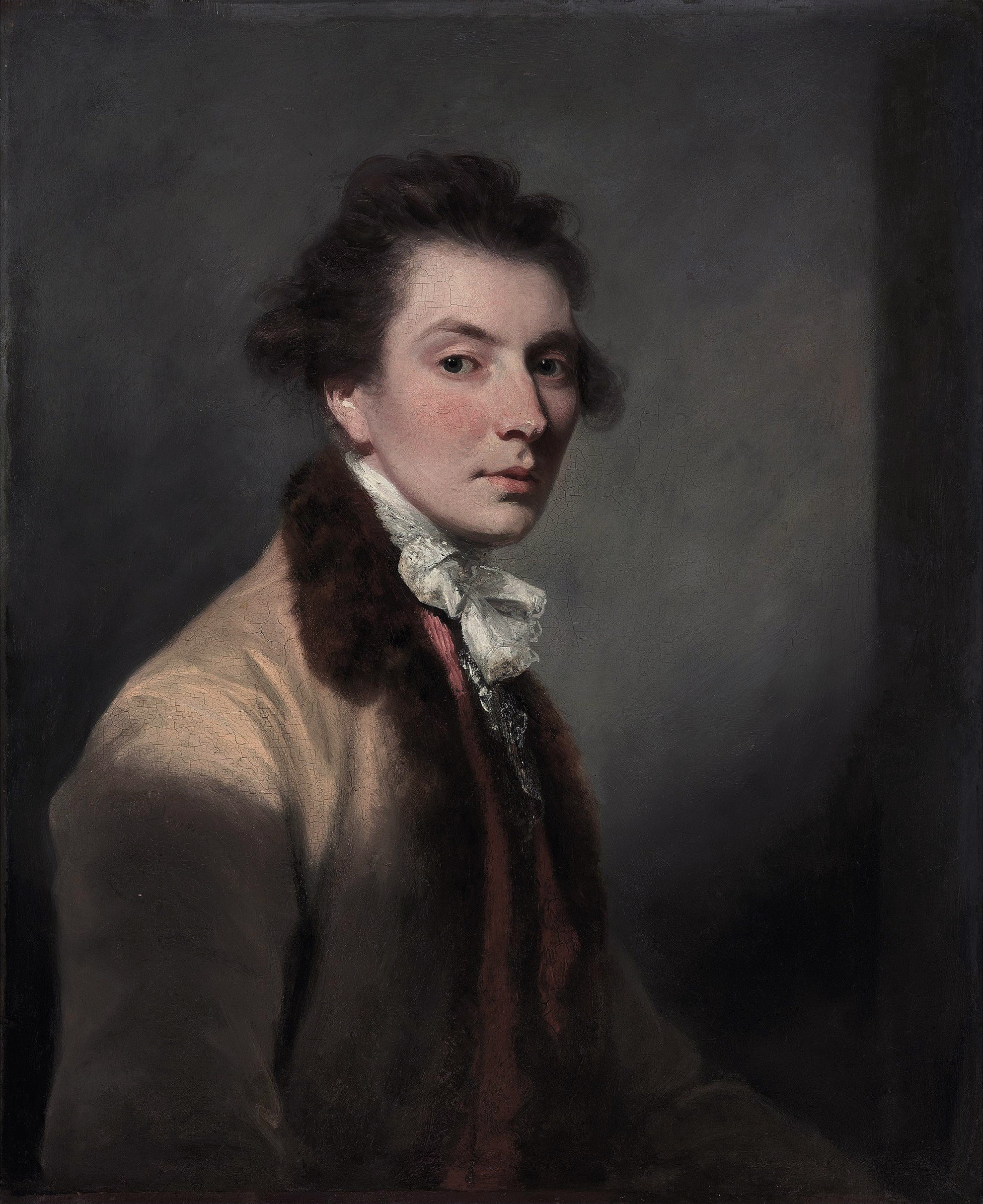
- Portrait by Joshua Reynolds, 1773
- Born: 7 February 1745; Dublin, Ireland
- Died: 5 June 1798 (aged 53); New Ross, County Wexford
- Resting place: Dublin, Ireland
- Occupations: Irish Landowner and Politician
- Known for: Developer of Mountjoy Square and Gardiner Street
- Parent: Charles Gardiner
- Relatives: Luke Gardiner (grandfather)

Luke Gardiner, 1st Viscount Mountjoy PC (Ire) (7 February 1745 – 5 June 1798) was an Irish landowner and politician.

== Biography ==
He was the son of Charles Gardiner by his wife Florinda, daughter of Robert Norman. His sister Anne later became Countess of Clancarty. On 3 July 1773 he married Elizabeth, daughter of William Montgomery, an MP for Ballynakill and later a Baronet. Their children included a son, Charles John, and a daughter Margaret, who later became Countess of Donoughmore. He was educated at St John's College, Cambridge.

From 1773 to 1789 he represented County Dublin in the Irish House of Commons. He was appointed to the Irish Privy Council on 29 December 1780 and created Baron Mountjoy on 19 September 1789 and Viscount Mountjoy on 30 September 1795, both in the Peerage of Ireland.

Lord Mountjoy was killed in action at the age of 53, leading his regiment at the Battle of New Ross.

He was succeeded by his son Charles, who was later created Earl of Blessington.

Parliament of Ireland
Preceded by Anthony Brabazon, Lord Ardee; Joseph Deane	Member of Parliament for County Dublin; 1773–1789; With: Joseph Deane 1773–1776; Sir Edward Newenham 1776–1789	Succeeded by William Brabazon, Lord Ardee; Sir Edward Newenham
Peerage of Ireland
New creation	Viscount Mountjoy; 1795–1798	Succeeded by Charles Gardiner
New creation	Baron Mountjoy; 1789–1798	Succeeded by Charles Gardiner
