= Anthony Brabazon, 8th Earl of Meath =

Anglo-Irish peer

Anthony Brabazon, 8th Earl of Meath (c. 1721 – 4 January 1790), styled Lord Brabazon from 1763 to 1772, was an Anglo-Irish peer.

The elder son of Edward Brabazon, 7th Earl of Meath and Martha Collins, he sat for County Wicklow from 1745 to 1760. He then sat for County Dublin from 1761 until he succeeded his father in the peerage in 1772. He died on 4 January 1790 and was succeeded by his eldest surviving son, William.

He was educated at Trinity College Dublin. On 20 May 1758, he married Grace Leigh (d. 28 October 1812), daughter of John Leigh of Rosegarland, County Wexford. Their children included:

- Chaworth Brabazon, Lord Brabazon (18 August 1760 – December 1779)
- William Brabazon, 9th Earl of Meath (1769–1797), killed in a duel
- Lady Catherine Brabazon (c.1770 – 24 December 1847), married Reverend Francis Brownlow (1779–1847)
- John Brabazon, 10th Earl of Meath (1772–1851), succeeded his brother

Parliament of Ireland
| Preceded by William Hoey; John Allen | Member of Parliament for County Wicklow; 1745–1760; With: William Hoey 1745–1747; Richard Chapel Whaley 1747–1760 | Succeeded by Ralph Howard; Hon. Richard Wingfield |
| Preceded by Hon. Edward Brabazon; Sir Compton Domvile | Member of Parliament for County Dublin; 1761–1772; With: Sir Compton Domvile 1761–1768; Charles Domvile 1768; Joseph Deane 1768–1772 | Succeeded by Joseph Deane; Luke Gardiner |
Honorary titles
| Preceded by The 7th Earl of Meath | Custos Rotulorum of County Wicklow; 1772–1790 | Succeeded by The 9th Earl of Meath |
Peerage of Ireland
| Preceded by Edward Brabazon | Earl of Meath; 1772–1790 | Succeeded by William Brabazon |
