= William Domvile =

William Domvile (1686 – November 1763) was an Anglo-Irish politician.

Domvile was the Member of Parliament for County Dublin in the Irish House of Commons between 1717 and 1727.

Parliament of Ireland
Preceded by Hon. Edward Brabazon; John Allen	Member of Parliament for County Dublin; 1717–1727; With: Hon. Edward Brabazon	Succeeded by Hon. Edward Brabazon; Compton Domvile
