= Inistioge (Parliament of Ireland constituency) =

Pre-1801 Irish constituency

- Former borough constituency for the Irish House of Commons
- County: County Kilkenny
- Borough: Inistioge

–1801
- Replaced by: Disfranchised

Inistioge or Innistiogue was a constituency represented in the Irish House of Commons until 1800.

== History ==
In the Patriot Parliament of 1689 summoned by James II, Inistioge was represented with two members.

== Members of Parliament ==
- 1585 David Power and Robert Archdeacon
- 1613–1615 William Murphy and Crihen Murphy
- 1634–1635 Griffen Murphy and James Dulan (or Neilan)
- 1639–1649 John Wandesford and Robert Loftus (Loftus died and replaced 1640 by John Fitzgerald)
- 1661–1666 Sir William Petty and Joseph Deane

=== 1689–1801 ===
Election	First MP	Second MP
1689	Edward FitzGerald	James Bolger
1692	Edward Deane	Robert Stopford
1695	Thomas Keightley	Robert Stopford
1703	Edward Deane	Benjamin Portlock
1713	Edward Deane	Charles Monck
1715	Edward Deane	Edward Deane
1717	Stephen Deane (Note: Declared not duly elected in 1727)	Edward Deane
1727	Folliot Ponsonby	Edward Deane
November 1727	Henry Ponsonby	Edward Deane
1745	Edward Deane	Edward Deane
1749	Edward Deane	Edward Herbert
1751	Joseph Deane	Edward Herbert
1761	Joseph Deane	John Hobson
1768	Joseph Matthews	Lodge Evans Morres
1776	Edward Tighe (Note: Also elected for Athboy in 1776, for which he chose to sit)	John Lloyd (Note: Also elected for King's County in 1776, for which he chose to sit)
1777	John Flood	John Parnell (Note: Succeeded as 2nd Baronet in 1782)
1783	George Ponsonby	John Ussher
1790	George Ponsonby	John Lloyd
1797	Henry Tighe	John Lloyd
1798	Henry Tighe	William Tighe
1801	Disenfranchised	

== Bibliography ==
- O'Hart, John (2007). The Irish and Anglo-Irish Landed Gentry: When Cromwell came to Ireland. Vol. II. Heritage Books. ISBN 978-0-7884-1927-0.
- Leigh Rayment's historical List of Members of the Irish House of Commons. Cites: Johnston-Liik, Edith Mary (2002). The History of the Irish Parliament 1692-1800 (6 volumes). Ulster Historical Foundation.
