= Simon Luttrell (Irish MP) =

Irish Jacobite politician and soldier

Simon Luttrell (1643 – 28 October 1698) was an Irish Jacobite politician and soldier.

== Biography ==
Luttrell was the eldest son of Thomas Luttrell of Luttrellstown and Barbara Sedgrave. He was the elder brother of Henry Luttrell. Like his brother, he spent much of his early life in France, including at the French court at the Palace of Versailles. On his return to Ireland in 1672, he married Catherine, daughter of Sir Thomas Newcomen, 5th Baronet. In 1674 he succeeded to his father's extensive estates in County Dublin.

In 1687, Luttrell was appointed Lord Lieutenant of County Dublin and made a member of the Privy Council of Ireland by the Earl of Tyrconnell. He remained loyal to James II of England after the Glorious Revolution, and in 1689 he was elected as the Member of Parliament for County Dublin in the short-lived Patriot Parliament. Luttrell was also appointed military governor of Dublin. In this capacity, he raised a regiment of 374 dragoons, prepared Dublin's defences against an awaited assault, and worked with Terence MacDermott to disarm the city's Protestant inhabitants. He was attainted by the Williamite government.

Following the lifting of the first Siege of Limerick in 1690, Luttrell was a member of the delegation which travelled to the Jacobite court at Château de Saint-Germain-en-Laye to call for the removal of Tyrconnell from the viceroyalty. He returned to Ireland on 28 October 1691, shortly after the Jacobite defeat, but Luttrell refused to avail himself of the pardon granted to him under the Articles of Limerick and left again for France. There he was given command of a battalion in the Irish Brigade of the French Royal Army. He served under Nicolas Catinat in Italy and Louis Joseph, Duke of Vendôme in Catalonia during the Nine Years' War. He died at Crest, Drôme in 1698. His confiscated estates had been transferred to his younger brother, Henry.

Parliament of Ireland
Preceded by Sir William Domville; Sir William Ussher	Member of Parliament for County Dublin; 1689; With: Patrick Sarsfield	Succeeded by John Allen; Chambré Brabazon
