= Brabazon =

Brabazon may refer to:

- Brabazon (name), including a list of people with the name
  - Baron Brabazon of Tara, a title in the Peerage of the United Kingdom
  - Brabazon baronets, a title in the Baronetage of Ireland
  - Earl of Meath, a title in the Peerage of Ireland held by the head of the Brabazon family, including a list of Earls with the surname
- Brabazon, Bristol, a place in England
  - Bristol Brabazon railway station, a new station being built to serve the development.
- Brabazon Course, a golf course at the English resort and hotel The Belfry
- Bristol Brabazon, a British large propeller-driven airliner
