= William Brabazon, 3rd Earl of Meath =

Anglo-Irish peer

William Brabazon, 3rd Earl of Meath (c. 1635 – March 1684), styled Lord Brabazon of Ardee between 1665 and 1675, was an Anglo-Irish peer.

Brabazon was the son of Edward Brabazon, 2nd Earl of Meath and Mary Chambré. On 30 October 1665 he was summoned to the Irish House of Lords by writ of acceleration as Baron Ardee. Between 1671 and his death he was Custos Rotulorum of County Dublin. In 1671 he was pardoned for having killed a man in a duel. He was a captain in Sir Arthur Forbes's Regiment of Horse in 1672. In 1674 he was made a member of the Privy Council of Ireland and in 1675 he succeeded to his father's title as Earl of Meath.

Brabazon married The Honorable Elizabeth Lennard, daughter of Francis Lennard, 14th Lord Dacre. Together they had two daughters. He was succeeded in his title by his brother, Edward Brabazon.

Peerage of Ireland
| Preceded by Edward Brabazon | Earl of Meath; 1675–1684 | Succeeded by Edward Brabazon |
