= William Brabazon, 9th Earl of Meath =

Anglo-Irish politician and peer (1769–1797)

- Earl of Meath
- Coat of arms
- Tenure: 1790-1797
- Predecessor: Anthony Brabazon, 8th Earl of Meath
- Successor: John Brabazon, 10th Earl of Meath
- Born: 6 July 1769
- Died: 26 May 1797 (aged 27)
- Cause of death: Died in a duel
- Father: Anthony Brabazon, 8th Earl of Meath
- Mother: Grace Leigh

William Brabazon, 9th Earl of Meath (6 July 1769 – 26 May 1797), styled Lord Brabazon from 1779 to 1790, was an Anglo-Irish peer.

The second son of Anthony Brabazon, 8th Earl of Meath and Grace Leigh, he became the heir apparent after the death of his elder brother Chaworth in 1779. He sat for County Dublin in the Irish House of Commons from 1789 until he succeeded his father in the peerage in 1790.

He was never married. Upon dying in a duel with one Captain Robert Gore on 26 May 1797, he was succeeded by his brother John Brabazon, 10th Earl of Meath.

Parliament of Ireland
Preceded by Luke Gardiner; Sir Edward Newenham	Member of Parliament for County Dublin; 1789–1790; With: Sir Edward Newenham	Succeeded by Sir Edward Newenham; John Finlay
Honorary titles
Preceded by The 8th Earl of Meath	Custos Rotulorum of County Wicklow; 1790–1797	Succeeded by The 10th Earl of Meath
Peerage of Ireland
Preceded by Anthony Brabazon	Earl of Meath; 1790–1797	Succeeded by John Brabazon
