= Custos Rotulorum of County Wicklow =

Civil officer position in County Wicklow, Ireland

The Custos Rotulorum of County Wicklow was the highest civil officer in County Wicklow, Ireland. The position was later combined with that of Lord Lieutenant of Wicklow.

== Incumbents ==
- 1763–1772 Edward Brabazon, 7th Earl of Meath
- 1772–1790 Anthony Brabazon, 8th Earl of Meath
- 1793–1797 William Brabazon, 9th Earl of Meath
- 1797–1851 John Brabazon, 10th Earl of Meath

For later custodes rotulorum, see Lord Lieutenant of Wicklow
