= Sir Compton Domvile, 2nd Baronet =

Anglo-Iriosh politician

Sir Compton Domvile, 2nd Baronet (1696 – 13 March 1768) was an Anglo-Irish politician.

Domvile was the son of Sir Thomas Domvile, 1st Baronet and in 1721 he inherited his father's baronetcy. Between 1721 and 1768 Domvile was Clerk of the Crown and Hanaper in the Irish Chancery. He was the Member of Parliament for County Dublin in the Irish House of Commons from 1727 until his death in 1768. In 1743 Domvile was made a member of the Privy Council of Ireland. He inherited Santry Court from his nephew, Lord Barry of Santry, in 1751 and made unsuccessful attempts to have the barony revived in his honour. Domvile's title became extinct upon his death.

Parliament of Ireland
Preceded by Hon. Edward Brabazon; William Domvile	Member of Parliament for County Dublin; 1727–1768; With: Hon. Edward Brabazon (1727–1758); Lord Brabazon (1761–1768)	Succeeded by Lord Brabazon; Charles Domvile
Baronetage of Ireland
Preceded by Thomas Domvile	Baronet (of Templeogue); 1721–1768	Extinct
