= Stephen Deane =

Irish politician

Stephen Deane was an Irish politician.

Deane was born in Dublin educated at Trinity College, Dublin.

Deane represented Inistioge from 1717 to 1727.
