= Edward Brabazon, 2nd Earl of Meath =

Anglo-Irish Royalist soldier and peer

Edward Brabazon, 2nd Earl of Meath (c. 1610 – 25 March 1675) was an Anglo-Irish Royalist soldier and peer.

Brabazon was the son of William Brabazon, 1st Earl of Meath and Jane Bingley. He was knighted in 1626. Between 1634 and 1635 he was the Member of Parliament for Athlone in the Irish House of Commons.

Brabazon fought for Charles I of England in the Irish Rebellion of 1641 and English Civil War, participating in the Battle of Edgehill in 1642 and commanding a troop of horse in the Royalist army. He was taken prisoner alongside his father in 1644 and imprisoned in the Tower of London by the Roundheads for eleven months. On 16 December 1651 he succeeded his father as Earl of Meath.

After the Stuart Restoration, Brabazon was made a member of the Privy Council of Ireland. He drowned off Holyhead in 1675 while taking a boat from Ireland to England.

He married Mary Chambré, daughter of Calcott Chambré and Mary Villiers, in 1632. Three of his sons succeeded to his title in turn; William in 1675, Edward in 1685 and Chambré in 1707.

Parliament of Ireland
Preceded by Walter Nugent; Richard St John	Member of Parliament for Athlone; 1634–1635; With: John Comyn	Succeeded by Oliver Jones; William Summers
Peerage of Ireland
Preceded by William Brabazon	Earl of Meath; 1651–1675	Succeeded by William Brabazon
