= Killruddery House =

Country house in County Wicklow, Ireland

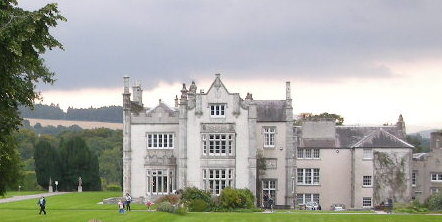
- Killruddery House (east side)
- Interactive map of the Killruddery House area

General information
- Location: Southern Cross, Bray, County Wicklow, Ireland
- Coordinates: 53.1816°N 6.1020°W
- Opened: 1651
- Owner: Earl of Meath

Technical details
- Grounds: 3,237,300 square metres (800.0 acres)

Website
- killruddery.com

Killruddery House (also spelled "Kilruddery") is a large country house on the southern outskirts of Bray in County Wicklow, Ireland, approximately 20 km (12 mi) south of Dublin. The present structure is a south-facing multi-bay mansion, originally dating from the 17th century, but remodelled and extended in 1820 in the Elizabethan style. It is constructed as variously single, two, three and four storeys in the shape of an irregular quadrangle enclosing a courtyard. To the north an office wing incorporates the 17th-century portion, and to the south and west is a large domed conservatory, the orangery, designed by William Burn in about the 1850s. The house sits within a large landscaped demesne which features a pair of 550-foot long parallel reflecting pools on the south lawn.

== History ==
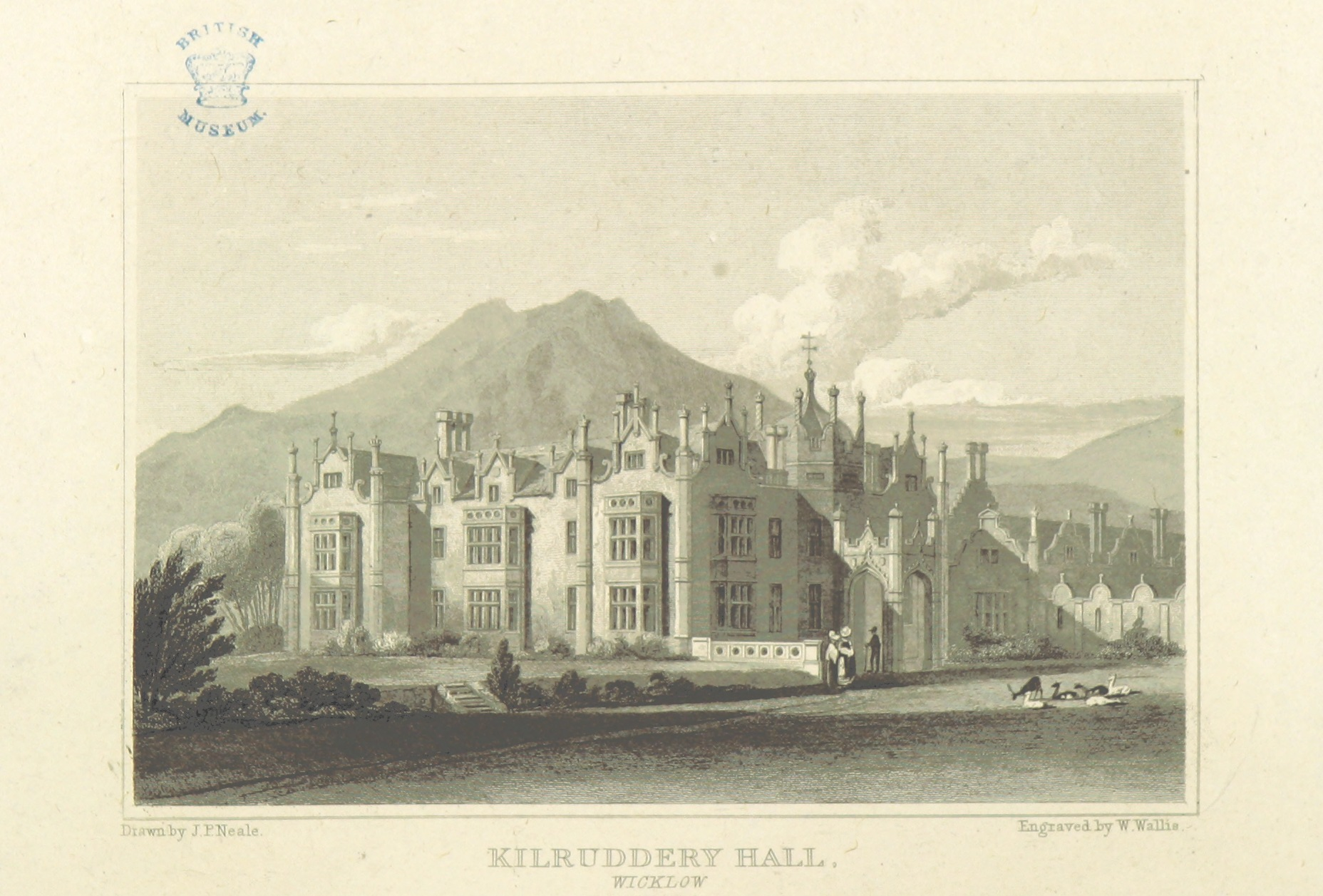
Kilruddery Hall, 1818

In 1534, Sir William Brabazon of Leicestershire was posted to Ireland to serve as Vice-Treasurer. Later, in 1539, after vigorously supporting King Henry VIII's efforts to break with Rome and the Dissolution of the Monasteries, Brabazon secured the ownership of the Abbey of St. Thomas, Dublin, whose lands included Killruddery.

In 1618, the land was granted to his great-grandson, also William Brabazon (c.1580-1651) who was made the 1st Earl of Meath in 1627. The 2nd Earl of Meath (1610–1675) built a new house at Killruddery in 1651 to replace one burned down in the civil war six years earlier. Contemporary pictures show an East-facing building of five bays.

John Brabazon, 10th Earl of Meath, carried out an extensive reconstruction of the house between 1820 and 1830. Architects Sir Richard Morrison and his son William Vitruvius Morrison were commissioned to build a Tudor Revival mansion incorporating the original 17th-century mansion. The result was a large building, featuring a North-facing entrance with a cupola, behind which clustered a number of wings forming an irregular quadrangle around a central courtyard. The interior of the house originally featured elaborate chimney-pieces by Giacinto Micali, crimson silk damask from Spitalfields, stained glass by John Milner, a domed ceiling by Henry Popje and a drawing room ceiling by Simon Gilligan. A clock tower in the forecourt houses a water clock designed and constructed by Reginald Brabazon, 13th Earl of Meath, with a pendulum powered by a jet of water.

Reginald Brabazon, 12th Earl of Meath granted extensive use of the site to the Scout movement for camping, with the Scout Association of Ireland establishing its training base on the estate at Giltspur Lodge. Baden Powell visited the house in 1928.

From 1952 to 1962, the house underwent a reconstruction, due to severe dry rot. Builders carefully demolished the façade, numbering each brick, and rebuilt a new entrance. A few sections of the house, including the original grand entrance and dome were lost, and the house was remodeled by Claud Phillimore (who succeeded, in 1990, as Baron Phillimore).

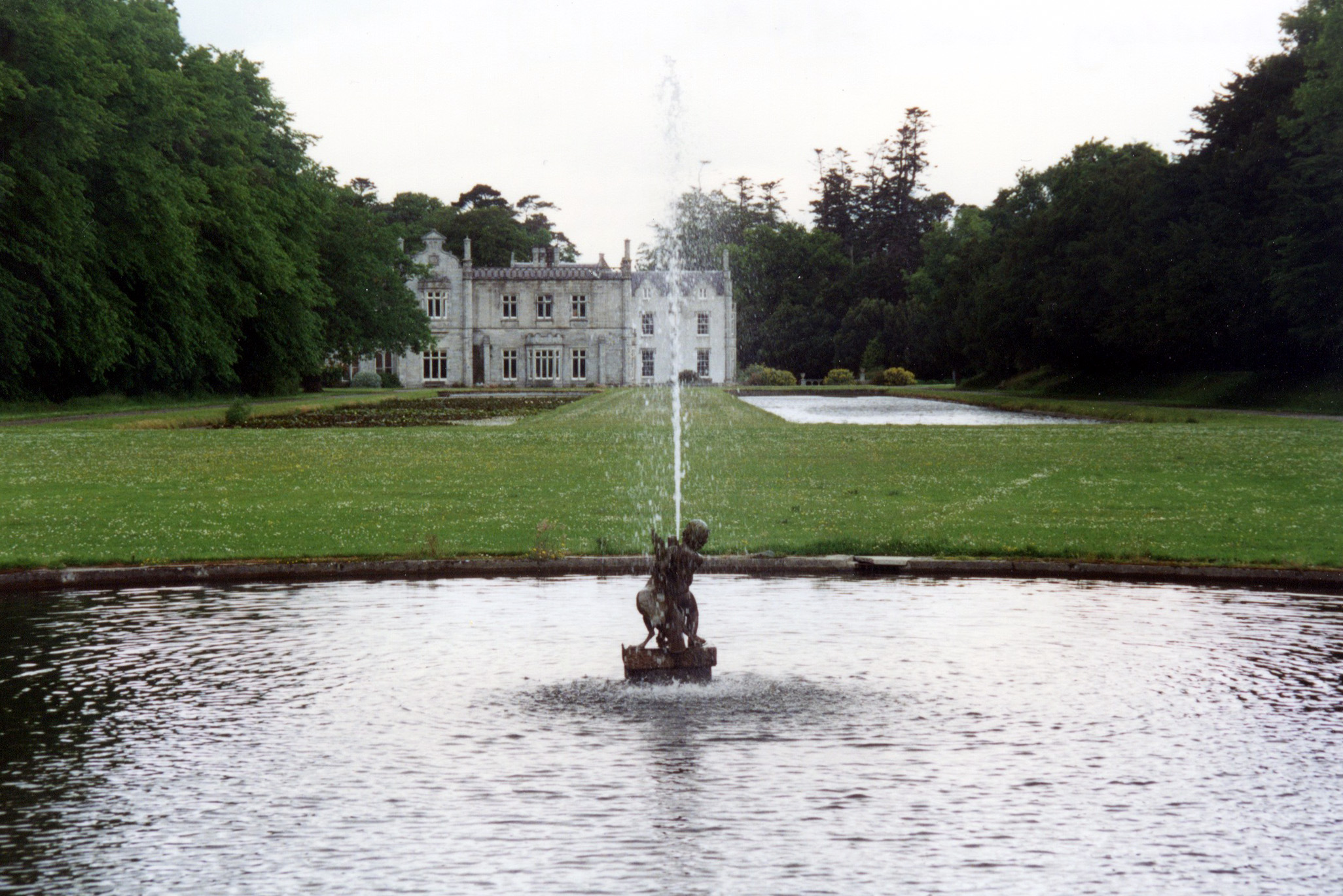
South façade showing the twin Long Ponds and a round pond with fountain (1996)

As of the 21st century, the estate is owned and occupied by John Brabazon, 15th Earl of Meath and his wife Xenia. As of 2016, their son Anthony Brabazon (heir apparent to the Earl of Meath title) and his wife Fionnuala manage the house, gardens and farm, and also live in the house with their own children. The property is managed as a working farm with a number of enterprises used to earn the funds to maintain the estate and provide a living. They operate tours, events, sports, horse riding, festivals, concerts, filming location rentals, farmers market, cafe, and weddings. The working farm produces food for the events and café.

Killruddery's gardens have also been host to the Groove Festival, which launched in 2013.

== Gardens ==
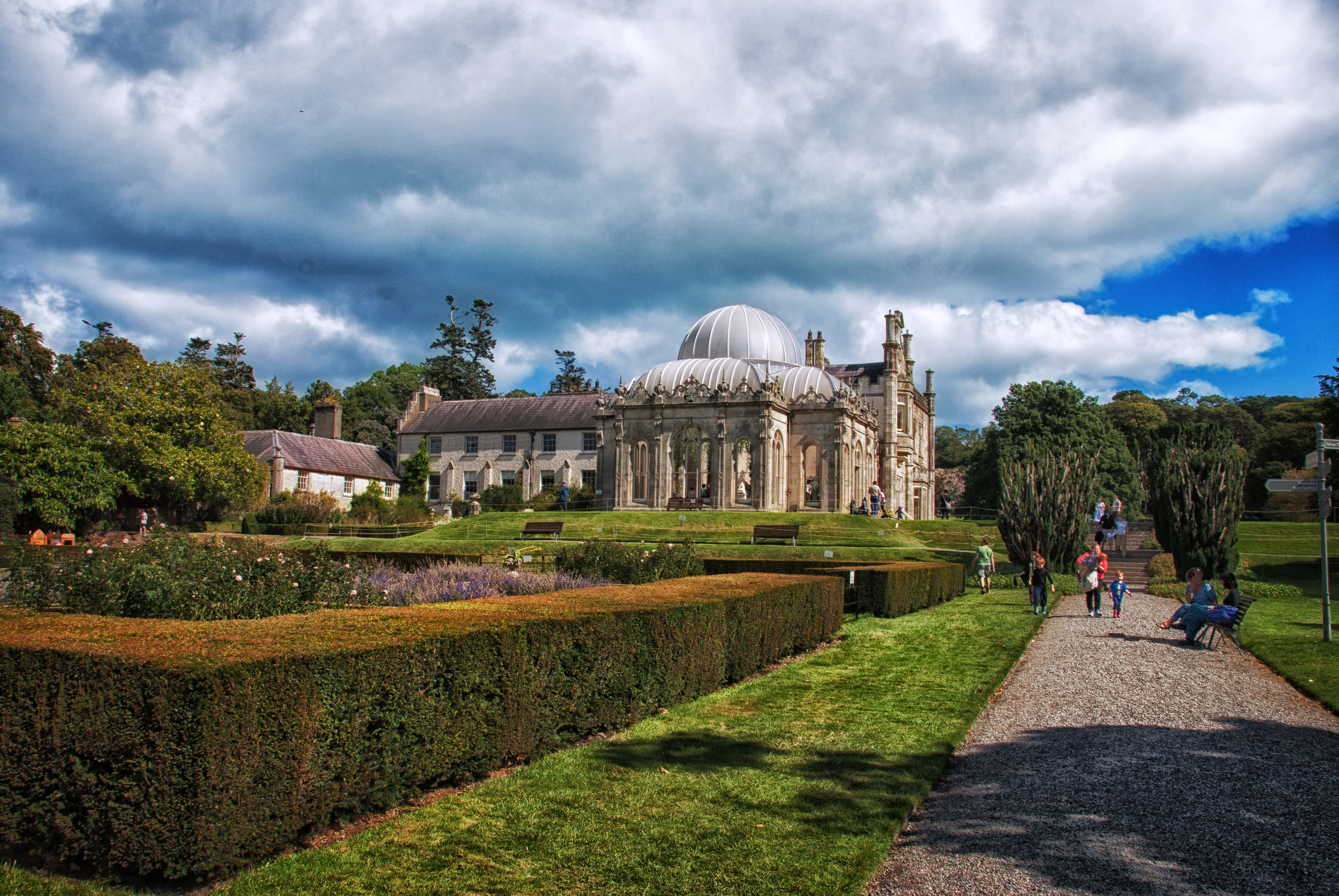
The west side of the house showing the orangery and some of the formal gardens

At the foot of the Little Sugar Loaf mountain, the estate has over 800 acres. In 1684, Monsieur Bonet was hired to build the gardens inspired by the then-popular French Gardens of Versailles. The idea for the two 550-foot long reflecting pools came from the canals at Château de Courances, and stocked fish for the house. Also constructed during the 4th Earl's ownership was a summer house, pleasure garden, cherry garden, kitchen garden, gravel walks, a bowling green, a walled garden with fruit trees, a ha-ha, avenues, ponds, formal hedges, and a deer park.

In 1846, Daniel Robertson restored the gardens for the 11th Earl. A conservatory was built, designed by William Burn in the 1850s.

In 1951, the 14th Earl and Countess of Meath returned to the property and were faced with dry rot on the buildings and overgrown gardens. Without a gardener for many years, they gradually worked to restore the gardens themselves. They opened the house and gardens to the public.

As of 2002, there were over 90 acres of gardens with 3.5 miles of hedging.

== Filming location ==
The following films or television series have been filmed in part on the estate:

- Excalibur (1981)
- My Left Foot (1989)
- Far and Away (1992)
- Angela's Ashes (1999)
- Camelot (2011)
- The Tudors (2007-2010)
- Into the Badlands (2015-2019)
- The Turning (2020)
- Fate: The Winx Saga (2021-2022)
- Irish Wish (2024)
