= Brabazon scheme =

1882 workhouse training programme

The Brabazon scheme was initiated in 1882 by Lady Brabazon, later the Countess of Meath, to provide occupation for the non-able-bodied inmates of workhouses in crafts such as knitting, embroidery and lace making. Training in the various crafts was provided by volunteers, and the costs were initially borne by Lady Brabazon herself. The scheme was slow to take off, until workhouses discovered that the goods being produced could be sold, and thus the project could be self-financing. On a visit to the workhouse in Great Yarmouth in 1903 Queen Alexandra paid £5 – equivalent to about £455 as of 2012 (Note: Comparing relative purchasing power of £5 in 1903 with 2012) – for a bedspread made by two elderly inmates, "to encourage the old people in their work". Christchurch Poor Law Union became involved in the Brabazon scheme to provide occupation for old men, who produced goods such as baskets, rugs, wickerwork and woollen clothing. Proceeds from the sale of these products was used to cover the cost of materials or to provide extras for the wards, such as a gramophone. The men were usually paid for their labour with extra tobacco.

By 1900 there were 177 Poor Law Unions taking part in the scheme. The projects were usually managed locally by members of a ladies committee for the union operating the workhouse.
