= John Brabazon, 15th Earl of Meath =

British and Irish peer and landowner

John Anthony Brabazon, 15th Earl of Meath (born 11 May 1941), previously known as Lord Ardee, is a British and Irish peer and a landowner in County Wicklow. He was a member of the House of Lords from 1998 to 1999, due to his British peerage. Titles in the Peerage of Ireland continue to be recognised in Britain and can be used in Ireland.

== Early life ==
The son of Major Anthony Windham Normand Brabazon and Elizabeth Mary Bowlby, he was known as Lord Ardee from 1949, when his father became 14th Earl of Meath. He was educated at Harrow School and was Page of Honour to Queen Elizabeth II between 1956 and 1958. In 1959, he was commissioned as a subaltern into the Grenadier Guards and served until 1963.

== Career ==
On 19 December 1998, he succeeded to his father's peerages, two in the peerage of Ireland, Earl of Meath (1627) and Baron Ardee (1616), and one in the peerage of the United Kingdom, Baron Chaworth of Eaton Hall (1831), the last of these giving him a seat in the House of Lords. However, this came to an end when the House of Lords Act 1999 came into effect.

In 1997, Meath was reported to be a writer and speaker on national competitiveness and social decay in the last two decades of the 19th century.

== Personal life ==
On 12 May 1973, he married Xenia Goudime-Levkovitsch, daughter of Paul Goudime-Levkovitsch. They have three children:

- Lady Corinna Lettice Brabazon (born 1974)
- Anthony Jacques Brabazon, Lord Ardee (born 1977)
- Lady Serena Alexandra Brabazon (born 1979)

He lives at Killruddery House, Bray, County Wicklow, Ireland. In 2001, he sold a mountain sporting estate of 4,125 acres at Rathdrum, County Wicklow, for £10 million, but continued to own some 800 acres in the same county, estimated to be far more valuable.

== Notes ==
Peerage of Ireland
Preceded by Anthony Windham Normand Brabazon	Earl of Meath; 1998–	Succeeded by Incumbent
Peerage of the United Kingdom
Preceded by Anthony Windham Normand Brabazon	Baron Chaworth; 1998–	Succeeded by Incumbent
