= Brabazon Casement =

Rugby union player from Northern Ireland

- Full name: Brabazon Newcomen Casement
- Born: 19 August 1852 Ballycastle, County Antrim, Ireland
- Died: 24 February 1910 (aged 57) Wollomombi, New South Wales, Australia
- School: Royal School Dungannon
- University: Trinity College Dublin
- Occupation: Doctor

Rugby union career
- Position: Forward
International career
Years	Team	Apps	(Points)
1875–79	Ireland	3	(0)

Brabazon Newcomen Casement (19 August 1852 — 24 February 1910) was an Irish international rugby union player.

Born in Ballycastle, County Antrim, Casement attended the Royal School Dungannon and Trinity College Dublin.

Casement had seven seasons of rugby with Dublin University, which he captained, and was capped three times for Ireland, including their first ever international in 1875 against England at The Oval.

After getting his medical degree, Casement practised in County Antrim until 1882, when he moved to New South Wales and took over a practice in Kempsey. He also worked as a surgeon at Macleay District Hospital.

Casement died of injuries sustained in an accident involving a horse drawn coach in 1910.

== See also ==
- List of Ireland national rugby union players
