= Chaworth Brabazon, 6th Earl of Meath =

Anglo-Irish peer

Chaworth Brabazon, 6th Earl of Meath PC (I) (1686 – 14 May 1763), styled Lord Brabazon from 1707 to 1715, was an Anglo-Irish peer.

The eldest surviving son of Chambré Brabazon, 5th Earl of Meath and Juliana Chaworth, he sat for County Dublin from 1713 to 1714 before being called up to the Irish House of Lords by writ in acceleration as Baron Ardee. In the following year, he succeeded his father as Earl of Meath. He was governor of County Dublin and County Wicklow, and was appointed to the Privy Council of Ireland in 1716.

As Earl, Chaworth presided over the building of the Earl of Meath's townhouse, 'Ardee House', in the Coombe in 1719, and which stood for over 200 years before being demolished in 1943.

On 11 December 1731, he married Juliana (d. 12 December 1758), daughter of Sir Thomas Prendergast, 1st Baronet and Penelope Cadogan. They had no children; when he died at Calais in 1763, he was succeeded by his brother Edward.

Parliament of Ireland
Preceded by John Allen; Joseph Deane	Member of Parliament for County Dublin; 1713–1714; With: Joseph Deane	Succeeded by Hon. Edward Brabazon; John Allen
Peerage of Ireland
Preceded by Chambré Brabazon	Earl of Meath; 1715–1763	Succeeded by Edward Brabazon
Preceded by Chambré Brabazon	Baron Ardee (writ in acceleration); 1714–1763	Succeeded by Edward Brabazon
