= Charles Domvile =

Anglo-Irish politician

Charles Domvile (1740 – 19 April 1810) was an Anglo-Irish politician.

Born Charles Pocklington, the son of Admiral Christopher Pocklington and Elizabeth Pocklington (née Domvile). He assumed the surname of Domvile by Royal Licence on inheriting the estate of his uncle, Sir Compton Domvile, 2nd Baronet. Domvile was the Member of Parliament for County Dublin in the Irish House of Commons between April and June 1768.

He married Margaret Sheppard with whom he had, Henry Barry Domvile who would inherit his estate, and the Santry estate.

Parliament of Ireland
Preceded by Lord Brabazon; Sir Compton Domvile, Bt	Member of Parliament for County Dublin; 1768; With: Lord Brabazon	Succeeded by Lord Brabazon; Joseph Deane
