= Edward Brabazon, 7th Earl of Meath =

Anglo-Irish peer

Edward Brabazon, 7th Earl of Meath (c. 1691 – 24 November 1772) was an Anglo-Irish peer.

The second surviving son of Chambré Brabazon, 5th Earl of Meath and Juliana Chaworth, he sat for County Dublin from 1715, when his elder brother was called up to the Irish House of Lords, to 1758. In 1763, he succeeded his brother as Earl of Meath.

Around 1720, he married Martha (d. 24 April 1762), daughter of Rev. William Collins. Upon his death in 1772, he was succeeded by his eldest son Anthony. He and Martha had a younger son William who married Katherine Gifford of Aghern, County Cork.

Parliament of Ireland
Preceded by Lord Brabazon; Joseph Deane	Member of Parliament for County Dublin; 1715–1758; With: John Allen 1715–1717; William Domvile 1717–1727; Sir Compton Domvile 1727–1758	Succeeded by Sir Compton Domvile; Anthony Brabazon
Honorary titles
Unknown	Custos Rotulorum of County Wicklow; 1763–1772	Succeeded by The 8th Earl of Meath
Peerage of Ireland
Preceded by Chaworth Brabazon	Earl of Meath; 1763–1772	Succeeded by Anthony Brabazon
