= Edward Brabazon, 4th Earl of Meath =

Anglo-Irish politician, peer and soldier

Edward Brabazon, 4th Earl of Meath (c. 1638 – 22 February 1707) was an Anglo-Irish politician, peer and soldier.

Brabazon was the son of Edward Brabazon, 2nd Earl of Meath and Mary Chambré. He was a captain in a regiment of foot in 1661. Between June and August 1666 he was briefly a Member of Parliament for County Wicklow in the Irish House of Commons. In 1675 he was appointed Ranger of all the Royal Parks in Ireland and in 1679 he was made a member of the Privy Council of Ireland.

He succeeded to his brother's title as Earl of Meath in 1684. In 1685, Brabazon was appointed Custos Rotulorum of County Dublin and Kildare. Following the Glorious Revolution, he supported William III of England and became a colonel of a regiment of foot in his army in Ireland in 1689. The same year, he was attainted in absentia by James II's Patriot Parliament in Dublin. He fought in the Siege of Carrickfergus, Battle of the Boyne and the Siege of Limerick, where he was wounded. In 1690 was reaffirmed as a Privy Counsellor.

Brabazon was Governor of the Company of the Royal Fishery of Ireland 1692 and a Commissioner of the Great Seal of Ireland in 1693, 1697 and 1702.

He married twice, but died without issue and was succeeded in his title by his younger brother, Chambré Brabazon.

Parliament of Ireland
Preceded by Folliott Wingfield; Abraham Yarner	Member of Parliament for County Wicklow; 1666; With: Folliott Wingfield	Succeeded by Richard Butler; William Talbot
Peerage of Ireland
Preceded by William Brabazon	Earl of Meath; 1684–1707	Succeeded by Chambré Brabazon
