= Coolmore House =

Georgian House in County Cork, Ireland

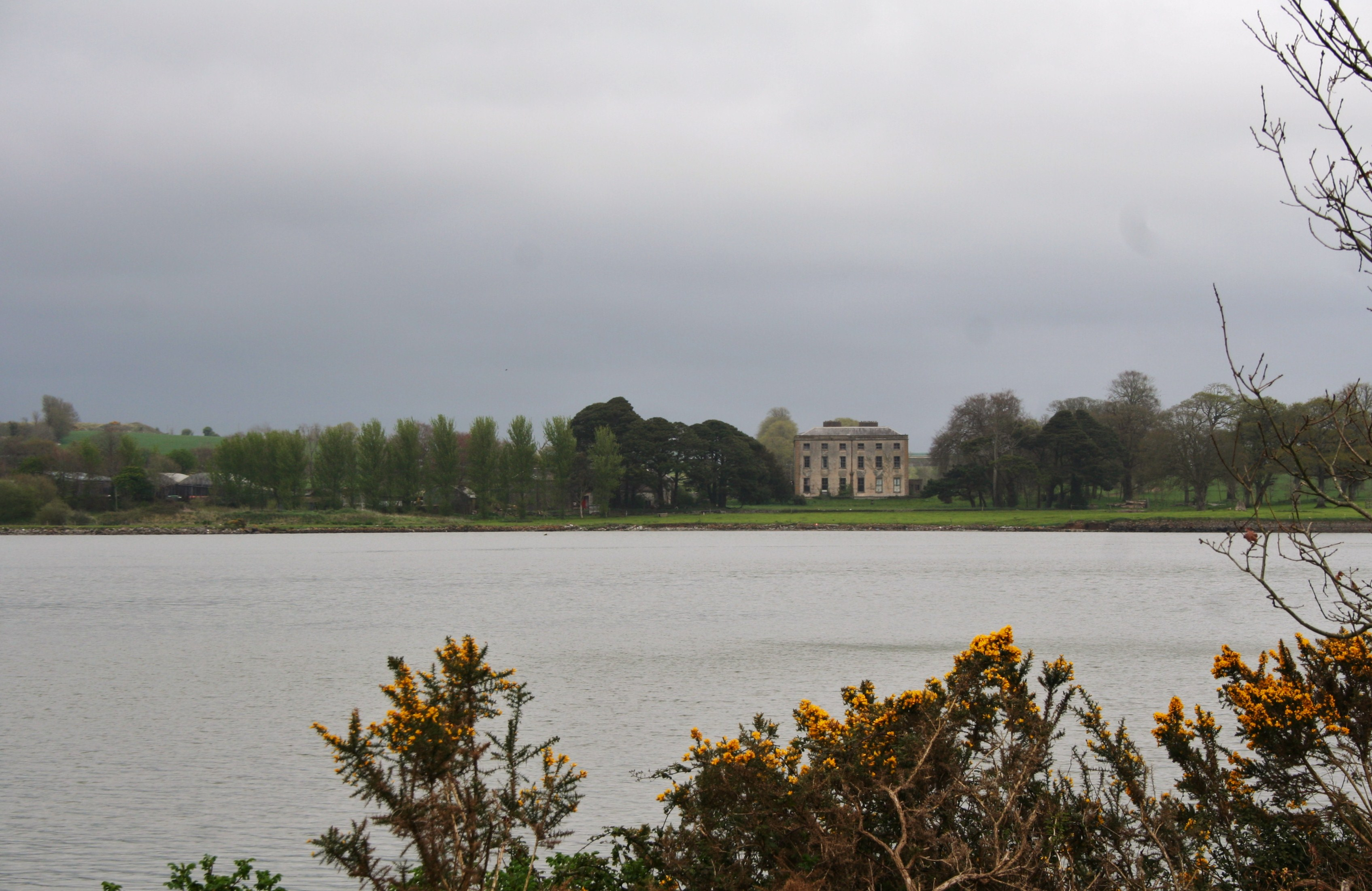
- Interactive map of the Coolmore House area

General information
- Location: Cork, Ireland
- Coordinates: 51.8125°N 8.3417°W
- Completed: 1788

Design and construction
- Architect: Unknown

Coolmore House is a Georgian house located near Carrigaline, County Cork, Ireland.

== History ==
Built in 1788 by William Worth Newenham, Coolmore House is on the site of an older building from the late 1600s. This site has been the ancestral home of the Newenham family since that time. The property was still owned by the Newenham family as of 2014.

As of 2026, the house is in a derelict state.

== Trivia ==
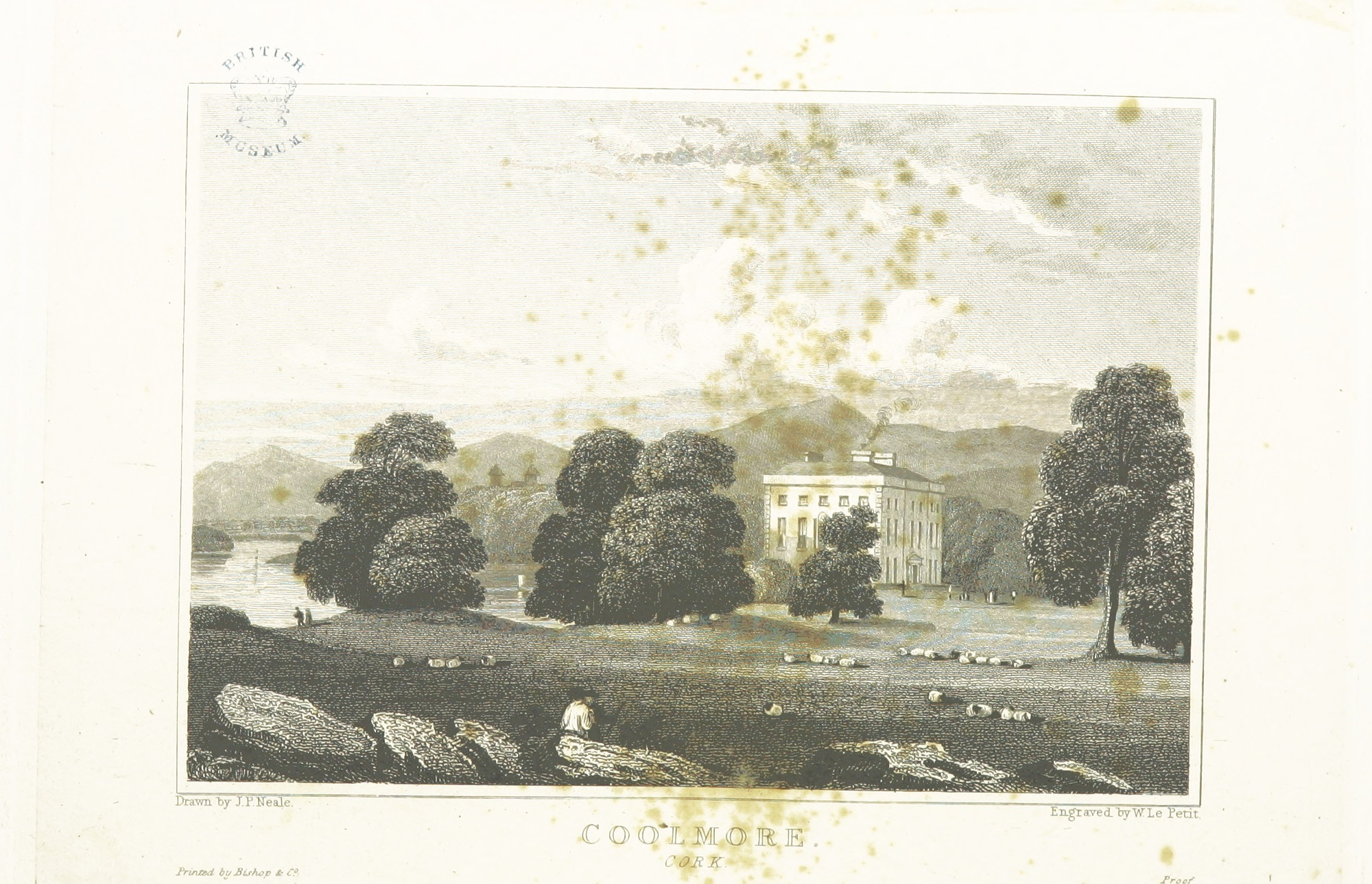
Illustration of the house in 1826.

In the 1983 television adaption of Molly Keane's Good Behaviour, Coolmore House was used as the fictional setting of Temple Alice.

A painting of the house was commissioned by the Newenhams in 1809 by Gaspare Gabrielli. It sold for £156,500 at auction in 2007.
