= Edward Newenham =

Irish politician

Sir Edward Newenham (1734–1814) was an Irish politician.

== Life ==
A younger son of William Newenham, of Coolmore House, County Cork, and Dorothea, daughter and heiress of Edward Worth, he was born on 5 November 1734. He was appointed collector of the excise of Dublin in 1764, but was removed in 1772, apparently for political reasons.

In the Irish Parliament Newenham represented Enniscorthy from 1769 to 1776, and County Dublin from 1776 to 1797. He was a man of moderate political views, but a reformer of Parliament, within the limits of the constitution, and on strictly Protestant lines. He induced Parliament to add a clause to the Catholic Relief Bill of 1778 for the removal of nonconformist disabilities; but it was opposed by the government, and struck out by the British Privy Council.

Also he was a personal and ardent writing friend to George Washington and Benjamin Franklin. He met Franklin, John Jay and the Marquis de Lafayette whilst on a European Tour with his immediate family during the year of 1782. Newenham even constructed a monument to Washington and American independence in the grounds of his home at Belcamp Hall in 1778.

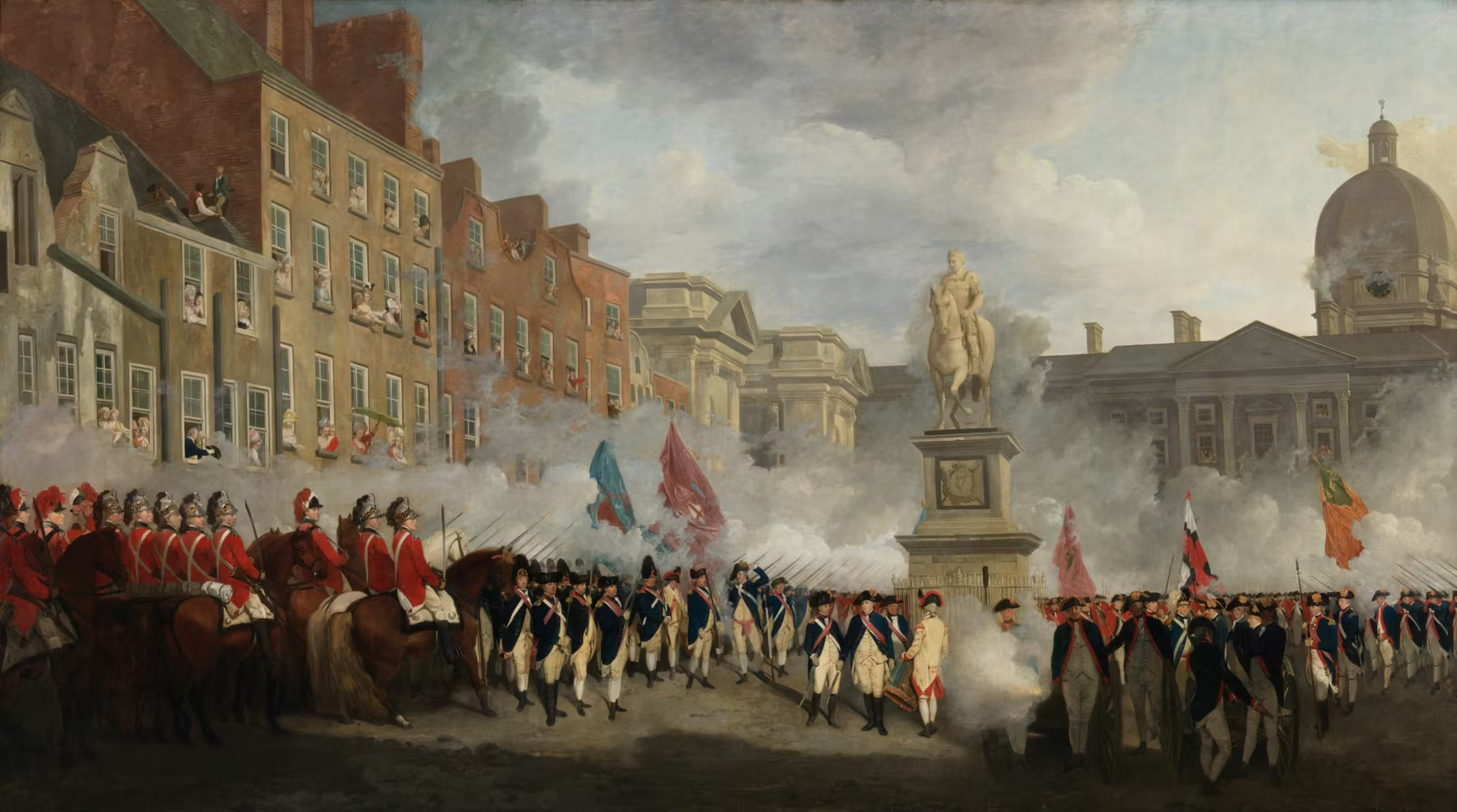
The Dublin Volunteers on College Green by Francis Wheatley depicting the Dublin Volunteers on College Green. Newenham is the figure to the immediate left of the Duke of Leinster, who is positioned centrally, in front of the statue of King William.

A noted "Duelist" 3 times over, one of these duels, was over a dispute in parliament. This duel took place on 20 March 1778 between Newenham and John Beresford, in which, neither was wounded. On the revival of the Catholic emancipation question in 1782 he spoke against further concessions. He disapproved of Henry Flood's renunciation agitation, on the ground that he did not make his amendments at the proper time, and in parliament supported Flood's Reform Bill. He took part in the volunteer convention on College Green in 1779, in charge of his "Liberty Volunteers". This coincided with a painting by Francis Wheatley (right), depicting this epic event. Sir Edward is noted in this painting, along with the "Dublin Volunteers" (Duke of Leinster) and the "Liberty Artillery" headed by one of Sir Edward's allies, the Pre-United Irishman - James Napper Tandy.

Sir Edward's lifestyle and forethought of his wealth, blindsided him. He did not have budgeting skills on the homefront, leaving massive debts in his wake. In order to pay for one debt, he had to borrow money, thus leaving him continually in debt. Part of this was from his children's marriage settlements, but also the misjudged his Aunt's estate that he was to inherit. One of his prized possessions, Belcamp Hall, had to be sold to pay for debts along with his townhouse at Granby Row off Rutland Square. His finances spiralled out of control, when Sir Edward sought exile in England. Eventually Sir Edward was held up by 4 baliff's that carried him back to Ireland, to face a £500 debt, where he had to front up that he couldn't pay it. He was therefore placed in to "debtors prison" under the very jail he sought to be built many years before - that was "Kilmainham Jail". Sir Edward's son, Edward Worth would not come to the aid of his father, rather Sir Edward had to seek "clemency" from Lord Castlereagh to secure a release. He eventually was released.

During 1785 Newenham suffered from ill-health. He continued to advocate moderate reforms; but as time went on he lost much of his old enthusiasm. The constitution, he said in 1792, required some improvement, but the times were unpropitious to the experiment. He did not sit in the last parliament before the Acts of Union 1800, but he was known to support them. He initially rejected the Act of Union, but at the last minute changed his mind to support it, in consequence of the rising Catholic movement. His later ideals seem to also follow John Fitzgibbon, Earl of Clare's viewpoint.

Newenham was elected to the American Philosophical Society in 1787.

Newenham died at Retiero, near Blackrock, Dublin, on 2 October 1814.

== Family ==
Newenham married Grace Anna, daughter of Sir Charles Burton and granddaughter of Alderman Benjamin Burton, on 4 February 1754. They had issue of eighteen children, though only 12 survived infancy. His son, Robert O'Callaghan Newenham, was author of Picturesque Views of the Antiquities of Ireland, London, 1830, 2 vols. Thomas Newenham the political writer was his nephew.

The following children of Sir Edward and Grace Anna:

- Jane Margaretta born 1754 - died young
- William born 1756 - died young
- Sarah Elizabeth born c.1757, married Major Alexander Graydon (born c.1734 - died 12 July 1812) and had issue. Sarah died c.1825
- Dorothea born c.1758, married Thomas Hughes on 3 December 1781 and had issue.
- Margaretta born c.1760, married Francis Philippe Fölsch von Fels and had issue. Margaretta died c.1843
- Charles born c.1761 - died young
- Edward Worth born 6 September 1762, married Elizabeth Persse (daughter of Col. William Persse of Roxborough and Sarah Blakeney), they had issue. Edward died in Boulogne-Sur-Mer, France on 15 March 1832.
- Elizabeth born c.1763, married Rev. John Wallace c.1784.
- Alicia born c.1765
- William Thomas born c.1766, married Barbara Lynam c.1787, they had issue. William died on 23 February 1843. Their son Charles Burton b.1794-d.18th Nov 1887, traveled to Australia and became Sheriff of South Australia for many years, just a few years after Adelaide was formed as a city.
- Lt. Charles Burton born c.1767, fought in the battle of Toulon, France. He gallantly defended a Fort, but died shortly after receiving wounds. His death was reported by Lord Admiral Samuel Hood. He died 24 September 1793.
- Grace Anna born c.1768, married John Browne c.1789.
- Robert O'Callaghan born 7 March 1770, married Susanna Hoare 24 March 1795 and had issue. Died 20 November 1849. He was Inspector General of Barracks and wrote the book "Picturesque Views of the Antiquities of Ireland".
- Catherine Matilda born c.1771 - died young
- Worth born c.1772 - died young
- Alicia born c.1774, married Rev. Walter Shirley on 26 July 1796. Alicia died 8 December 1855.
- Rachael born c.1775, married Rev. John Hoare on 31 August 1795. Died 6 November 1832. Edward Newenham Hoare was their son.
- Burton born c.1776, married Maria Burdett c.1797 Had issue. Died c.1858

== Sources and references ==
Attribution

This article incorporates text from a publication now in the public domain: Lee, Sidney, ed. (1894). "Newenham, Edward". Dictionary of National Biography. Vol. 40. London: Smith, Elder & Co.
