= John Brabazon, 10th Earl of Meath =

Anglo-Irish peer (1772–1851)

The Right Honourable The Earl of Meath KP PC (I)
- Coat of Arms of the Earls of Meath
- Born: Hon. John Chambré Brabazon; 9 April 1772
- Died: 15 March 1851 (aged 78)
- Occupation: Peer
- Spouse: Lady Melosina Meade (m. 1801)
- Children: 6, including William Brabazon, 11th Earl of Meath
- Parent(s): Anthony Brabazon, 8th Earl of Meath; Grace Leigh

John Chambré Brabazon, 10th Earl of Meath KP PC (I) (9 April 1772 – 15 March 1851), was an Anglo-Irish peer.

He was the third son of Anthony Brabazon, 8th Earl of Meath, and Grace Leigh. He became Earl of Meath in 1797 after the death of his brother William Brabazon, 9th Earl of Meath, who was killed in a duel with a Captain Robert Gore. He became Custos Rotulorum of County Wicklow from 1797 to 1851 and, from 1831 to 1851, Lord Lieutenant of County Dublin.

On 10 September 1831, by reason of his descent from the last Viscount Chaworth, he was created Baron Chaworth in the Peerage of the United Kingdom, giving him the automatic right to a seat in the British House of Lords. He was appointed a Knight of the Order of St Patrick on 24 November 1831 and was invested as a member of the Privy Council of Ireland in 1833.

On 31 December 1801, he married Lady Melosina Adelaide Meade, daughter of John Meade, 1st Earl of Clanwilliam and Theodosia Hawkins-Magill, and had six children, including William, who succeeded to the title.

Honorary titles
Preceded by The Earl of Meath	Custos Rotulorum of County Wicklow; 1797–1851	Succeeded by William Howard
New creation	Lord Lieutenant of County Dublin; 1831–1851	Succeeded by The Earl of Howth
Peerage of Ireland
Preceded by William Brabazon	Earl of Meath; 1797–1851	Succeeded by William Brabazon
Peerage of the United Kingdom
New creation	Baron Chaworth; 1831–1851	Succeeded by William Brabazon
