= Earl of Meath =

Title in the Peerage of Ireland

Arms of the Earls of Meath

Earl of Meath is a title in the Peerage of Ireland. It was created in 1627 and is held by the head of the Brabazon family.

== History ==
The Brabazon family descends from Sir Edward Brabazon, who represented County Wicklow in the Irish House of Commons and served as High Sheriff of Staffordshire in 1606. He was raised to the Peerage of Ireland as Baron Ardee in 1616. He was succeeded by his eldest son, the second Baron. He was created Earl of Meath in the Peerage of Ireland in 1627, with remainder to his younger brother, the Hon. Sir Anthony Brabazon. Lord Meath was succeeded by his son, the second Earl. His grandson, the fourth Earl, served as Lord-Lieutenant of Dublin and of Kildare. His wife Dorothy Stopford, daughter of James Stopford and Mary Forth, was a close friend of Jonathan Swift. He died childless and was succeeded by his younger brother, the fifth Earl. He was also Lord-Lieutenant of Dublin. He married the Hon. Juliana Chaworth, daughter of Patrick Chaworth, 3rd and last Viscount Chaworth.

Upon the death of the fifth Earl, the titles passed to his eldest son, the sixth Earl. He served as Lord-Lieutenant of Dublin and County Kildare. He died childless and was succeeded by his younger brother, the seventh Earl. His grandson, the ninth Earl, was killed in a duel in 1797. He was succeeded by his younger brother, the tenth Earl. He served as Lord-Lieutenant of Dublin from 1831 to 1851. The Chaworth title held by his ancestors was revived in 1831 when he was created Baron Chaworth, of Eaton Hall in the County of Hereford, in the Peerage of the United Kingdom. This title gave him and his descendants an automatic seat in the House of Lords. His son, the eleventh Earl, sat as MP for County Dublin from 1830 to 1832, and from 1837 to 1841, and was also Lord-Lieutenant of County Wicklow from 1869 to 1887. He was succeeded by his son, the twelfth Earl. He was a politician and philanthropist. His son, the thirteenth Earl, was a Brigadier-General in the Grenadier Guards and the Irish Guards. As of 2014, the titles are held by the latter's grandson, the fifteenth Earl, who succeeded his father in 1998.

The Hon. William Brabazon, of Tara House in County Meath, younger son of the seventh Earl, was the father of Barbara, who married John Moore. Their grandson John Arthur Henry Moore assumed the additional surname of Brabazon and was the father of the aviation pioneer and Conservative politician John Moore-Brabazon, 1st Baron Brabazon of Tara. (See Baron Brabazon of Tara for more information on this branch of the family.)

The family seat is Kilruddery House, near Bray in County Wicklow.

== Barons Ardee (1616) ==
- Edward Brabazon, 1st Baron Ardee (died 1625)
- William Brabazon, 2nd Baron Ardee (1580–1651) (created Earl of Meath in 1627)

== Earls of Meath (1627) ==
- William Brabazon, 1st Earl of Meath (1580–1651)
- Edward Brabazon, 2nd Earl of Meath (1610–1675)
- William Brabazon, 3rd Earl of Meath (1635–1685)
- Edward Brabazon, 4th Earl of Meath (1638–1707)
- Chambré Brabazon, 5th Earl of Meath (1645–1715)
- Chaworth Brabazon, 6th Earl of Meath (1686–1763)
- Edward Brabazon, 7th Earl of Meath (1691–1772)
- Anthony Brabazon, 8th Earl of Meath (1721–1790)
- William Brabazon, 9th Earl of Meath (1769–1797)
- John Chambre Brabazon, 10th Earl of Meath (1772–1851)
- William Brabazon, 11th Earl of Meath (1803–1887)
- Reginald Brabazon, 12th Earl of Meath (1841–1929)
- Reginald Le Normand Brabazon, 13th Earl of Meath (1869–1949)
- Anthony Windham Normand Brabazon, 14th Earl of Meath (1910–1998)
- John Anthony Brabazon, 15th Earl of Meath (born 1941)

The heir apparent is the present holder's only son, Anthony Jacques Brabazon, Lord Ardee (born 1977).
The heir apparent's heir apparent is his son, the Hon. Aldus Jack Brabazon (born 2010).

== See also ==
- Brabazon baronets
- Killruddery House
- Lordship of Meath
