= Edward Deane =

Irish politician

Edward Deane was an Irish politician.

Deane was born in Lymington and educated at Trinity College, Dublin.

Deane represented Inistioge from 1703 to 1717.
