= William Brabazon, 1st Earl of Meath =

Anglo-Irish peer

William Brabazon, 1st Earl of Meath (c.1580 – 18 December 1651) was an Anglo-Irish peer.

Brabazon was descended from an English family that was seated in Leicestershire from the reign of Henry III, and came to Ireland in the 1530s. He was the second but eldest surviving son of Edward Brabazon and Mary Smythe, daughter of Thomas Smythe, Clerk of the Green Cloth. His father had been created Baron Ardee in 1616. His grandfather, also William Brabazon, had served as Vice-Treasurer of Ireland for 23 years and the family acquired large estates there.

Brabazon was knighted in 1604 by James I. On 7 August 1625 he succeeded his father as Baron Ardee. He was made a member of the Privy Council of Ireland in 1627 and held various appointments in the government of Ireland. He also served as Custos Rotulorum of County Dublin. On 16 April 1627 he was created Earl of Meath in the Peerage of Ireland, with remainder in default of male heirs to his brother Sir Anthony Brabazon and his male heirs. In 1631 at Kilruddery House (which is still the family home) he hosted the marriage of his widowed sister Elizabeth to Sir John Bramston, the Lord Chief Justice of England (a belated love marriage which their father had forbidden many years earlier, but of which her brother evidently approved). In 1644, at the height of the Wars of the Three Kingdoms, Brabazon was sent by the Irish Parliament to the Royalist court at Oxford to consult with Charles I. He was subsequently taken prisoner by the Parliamentarians and imprisoned in the Tower of London for 11 months.

He married Jane Bingley (died 1644), the daughter of Sir John Bingley MP, Comptroller of the Musters and Cheques, and his first wife Anne Henshaw, and together they had one son, Edward. Edward succeeded his father in his titles in 1651.

Peerage of Ireland
New creation	Earl of Meath; 1627–1651	Succeeded by Edward Brabazon
Preceded by Edward Brabazon	Baron Ardee; 1625–1651	Succeeded by Edward Brabazon
