= George Harper (MP) =

16th-century English politician

Sir George Harper, JP (11 March 1503 to December 1558) was an English politician. He was Member of Parliament for Kent.

== Early life ==
Harper was born 11 March 1503. He was the son of Richard Harper of Latton, Harlow, Essex and his wife Constance, the daughter of Sir Robert Chamberlain of Capel and Gedding, Suffolk. He had one sister, Mary, who married Nicholas Clifford of Sutton Valence. In November 1524, George Harper married his first wife, Lucy, the daughter of Thomas Peckham. She died in 1552. By June 1556, Harper had married again, to Audrey Gainsford, widow of George Taylor of Lingfield, Surrey, and daughter of Sir John Gainsford (d.1540) of Crowhurst, Surrey, by his fifth wife, Audrey Shaa, daughter of Sir John Shaa, Lord Mayor of London.

== Political career ==
In February 1547, Harper was knighted. He held several offices. He was Esquire of the body by 1533; Justice of the Peace for Kent from 1539 to 1547; keeper of the manor of Penshurst, Kent 1543; Sheriff of Kent from 1548 to 1549 and held several commissions.

George Harper had been the ward of his grandfather after his father's death. After the death of his grandfather, Harper's stepfather, Alexander Culpeper, purchased his wardship for £180. The Culpepers were a well-known Kentish family during the sixteenth century. At the age of 21, he married his stepfather's great-niece Lucy Peckham. He became a courtier at the court of Henry VIII, and became an esquire of the body. During the Lincolnshire Rising in 1536, Harper was trusted to carry letters between the King and the Duke of Suffolk, who was leading the King's troops against the protesters.

Although the Harpers were from Essex, his stepfather, and his first wife, held most of their lands in Kent. Harper's dispute with Lucy led to legal proceedings; she had appealed to the King's chief minister, Thomas Cromwell, that Harper was refusing to support her because she would not put half her lands in his possession.

In 1540, the King married Catherine Howard, whose mother was Joyce Culpeper, a distant relative of Harper's stepfather. In 1540, Harper secured a private act (32 Hen. 8. c. 72) against his wife, giving him much of what she had inherited from her brother, including the manor of Horne Place in Kent.

Harper's half-brother, Thomas Culpeper, was a prominent courtier and a favourite of the King's, so much so that he was trusted to sleep in, or at the foot of, the King's bed. In 1541, accusations were made that Thomas Culpeper was having an affair with the Queen. Both Queen Catherine and Culpeper were executed in February 1542. Culpeper was attainted and his lands given to the crown, but Harper had remained in favour, and was given some of his half-brother's lands, including the manor of Penshurst, Kent. From his brother-in-law, Nicholas Clifford, he inherited the manor of Sutton Valence, which became his chief residence in Kent.

Harper spent much time in the 1540s overseas, and was involved in the conquest of Boulogne in 1544. After the town had been won by the English, Harper remained, organising transport. He was commended by Thomas Howard, 3rd Duke of Norfolk for his role. He suffered a gunshot wound in Boulogne. On 29 December 1544, Harper was elected knight of the shire for Kent. The Parliament next met in November 1545. Expecting a French invasion, Harper was involved in improving the defences of Kent, the English county nearest France.

He had some association with John Dudley, 1st Duke of Northumberland, and when Mary I of England reclaimed the throne from Jane Grey, she ordered him to come to court and be given a general pardon for any treason he may have been involved in. The next year there was widespread discontent at the Queen's marriage to Philip II of Spain, and Harper joined the rebellion led by Thomas Wyatt the younger. He changed sides several times and was eventually imprisoned in the Tower of London, but pardoned without trial on 6 November 1555.

== Death ==
Harper wrote his will on 8 November 1558, naming his second wife, Audrey, as executrix and residuary legatee. He died in December 1558, at his house in the Blackfriars, London. On 12 December he was buried in St. Martin's church, Ludgate. His widow married George Carleton, and died in January 1560. After her death his lands were inherited by his sister's son-in-law, William Isley, husband of Ursula Clifford. He had no children; the children born to his first wife during their marriage, two sons and three daughters, were recognised as the offspring of Sir Richard Morison.
