= Joseph Deane =

Irish politician and judge

Joseph Deane PC (Ire) (1674–1715) was an Irish politician and judge who became Chief Baron of the Irish Exchequer. His sudden and premature death was popularly believed to be due to a chill caught when watching an eclipse of the sun.

== Background ==
He was born in Crumlin, Dublin, son of Joseph Deane (of Deanehill, County Meath) and his wife Elizabeth Parker, daughter of John Parker, Archbishop of Dublin, and his wife Mary Clarke. His grandfather Major Joseph Deane was a close associate of Oliver Cromwell and a cousin of Richard Deane, the regicide. For his good services to Cromwell, the Major received large grants of land in five counties. On the Restoration of Charles II he managed to retain much of his property, including Crumlin and Terenure in Dublin. While the judge's brother Edward inherited most of the Deane estates including Terenure, Joseph inherited the Crumlin estate. He also owned a manor at Old Leighlin, County Carlow, which he later sold to the local Bishop, Bartholomew Vigors. The Bishop in turn bequeathed it to his successors in perpetuity.

Francis Elrington Ball stated in 1904 that Deane was said to have built Crumlin House likely onto the rear of an earlier manor house. As of 2023, the house is incorporated into the Salesian provincial house. A drawing of the house was also made by Thomas J Westropp in 1904.

== Career ==
Deane matriculated at Trinity College Dublin in 1689 and entered Gray's Inn in 1694.

He was called to the Bar and sat in the Irish House of Commons from 1703 to 1714 as member for County Dublin. He enjoyed the friendship of the powerful William King, Archbishop of Dublin who recommended him to the English Crown as a man of great sense, knowledge of the law, honesty and good temper. Deane was made a Privy Councillor and on the accession of King George I, he became the Irish Chief Baron.

== Death ==
Barely eight months after taking office Deane died suddenly in May 1715, just after returning from his first assize. According to popular belief, as reported by his friend Archbishop King, his death was due to catching a cold while watching the solar eclipse of May 3, 1715, as the weather was exceptionally cold and wet for May. F. Elrington Ball more prosaically states that his death was probably due to gout. He was buried in St. Patrick's Cathedral, Dublin.

== Family ==
Deane married Margaret Boyle, daughter of Colonel Henry Boyle and Lady Mary O'Brien, and sister of Henry Boyle, 1st Earl of Shannon. Their only son died young, and the judge's estates passed to his five daughters, all of whom married into the aristocracy. They were:

- Elizabeth, who married Hayes St. Leger, 4th Viscount Doneraile
- Anne, who married Arthur Hill-Trevor, 1st Viscount Dungannon, but died young, without issue
- Mary, who married John Bourke, 1st Earl of Mayo
- Catherine, who married John Lysaght, 1st Baron Lisle
- Margaret, who married John FitzGerald, 15th Knight of Kerry
