= List of Privy Counsellors of Ireland =

This is a list of privy counsellors of Ireland appointed between the accession of Charles II in 1660 following the Stuart Restoration and the creation of the Irish Free State in 1922, when the council effectively ceased to exist.

== Charles II, 1660–1685 ==
=== 1660 ===
- George Monck, 1st Duke of Albemarle (1608–1670)
- John Bramhall (1594–1663)
- Francis Aungier, 3rd Baron Aungier of Longford later 1st Earl of Longford (c. 1632–1700)
- Sir James Barry (1603–1672)
- John Bysse (d. 1680)
- Richard Boyle, 2nd Earl of Cork (1612–1698)
- Edward Conway, 3rd Viscount Conway later 1st Earl of Conway (c. 1623–1683)
- Michael Boyle (c. 1609–1702)
- William Caulfeild, 5th Baron Caulfeild later 1st Viscount Charlemont (1624–1671)
- James Margetson (1600–1678)
- Arthur Chichester, 1st Earl of Donegall (1606–1675)
- James Donnellan (d. 1665)
- Sir Maurice Eustace (d. 1665)
- Sir Robert Forth (c.1600–c.1663)
- Arthur Hill (c. 1600–1663)
- Sir Theophilus Jones (d. 1685)
- John King, 1st Baron Kingston (d. 1676)
- Edward Brabazon, 2nd Earl of Meath (c. 1610–1675)
- Charles Coote, 1st Earl of Mountrath (c. 1610–1661)
- Henry Moore, 3rd Viscount Moore later 1st Earl of Drogheda (d. 1675)
- Hugh Montgomery, 3rd Viscount Montgomery later 1st Earl of Mount Alexander (c. 1625–1663)
- John Clotworthy, 1st Viscount Massereene (d. 1665)
- Henry Leslie (1580–1661)
- Sir Robert Meredyth (d. 1668)
- Sir Philip Mainwaring (d. 1661)
- James Butler, 1st Marquess of Ormonde later 1st Duke of Ormonde (1610–1688)
- Roger Boyle, 1st Earl of Orrery (1621–1679)
- Earl of Ossory (1634–1680)
- Thomas Pigott
- Arthur Jones, 2nd Viscount Ranelagh (d. 1670)
- Sir Henry Tichborne (d. 1667)
- Sir John Temple (d. 1677)
- Marcus Trevor (1618–1670)
- Arthur Annesley, 2nd Viscount Valentia later 1st Earl of Anglesey (1614–1686)
- Sir James Ware (1594–1666)
- Sir George Wentworth (d. 1666)

=== 1661 ===
- Sir Paul Davys (d. 1672)
- Sir Edward Massey (d. 1675)
- Henry Jones (1605–1682)
- Sir William Flower (d.1682)

=== 1662 ===
- Henry Cary, 4th Viscount Falkland (1634–1663)

=== 1663 ===
- Maurice Berkeley (1628–1690)
- Sir Thomas Clarges (c. 1618–1695)

=== 1664 ===
- Sir Robert Byron (d. 1674)
- Sir George Lane (c. 1620–1683)

=== 1665 ===
- Sir Edward Smith (d. 1681/2)
- Wentworth Dillon, 4th Earl of Roscommon (c. 1630–1685)

=== 1667 ===
- Richard Power, 6th Baron Power later 1st Earl of Tyrone (1630–1690)
- Sir Edward Dering, Bt (1625–1684)
- John Skeffington, 2nd Viscount Massereene (1632–1695)

=== 1668 ===
- Richard Jones, 1st Earl of Ranelagh (1641–1712)

=== 1669 ===
- Edward Herbert, 3rd Baron Herbert of Chirbury (1633–1678)

=== 1670 ===
- Sir Robert Booth (d. 1681)
- Sir Arthur Forbes, Bt (1623–1695)

=== 1671 ===
- Lord O'Brien (c. 1640–1692)
- Henry Hamilton, 2nd Earl of Clanbrassil (1647–1675)
- Sir Maurice Eustace (d. 1693)
- Sir Charles Meredyth (c. 1628–1700)
- Sir Henry Ingoldsby (d. 1701)

=== 1672 ===
- Sir William Stewart, Bt (d. 1692)
- Sir Arthur Chichester (d. 1678)
- Sir William Flower (d. 1683)
- Sir John Stephens (d. 1675)

=== 1673 ===
- Sir Hans Hamilton, Bt (d. 1682)
- Sir John Povey (d. 1679)
- Sir Henry Capel (1638–1696)
- Sir George Rawdon, Bt (1604–1684)
- Lord Ibracken (d. 1678)
- William Harbord (1635–1692)

=== 1674 ===
- Lord Brabazon (c. 1635–1685)
- Carey Dillon (1627–1689)
- Sir Thomas Stanley (d. 1674)

=== 1675 ===
- Sir Richard Gethin, Bt (c. 1615–c. 1685)
- Murrough Boyle, 1st Viscount Blesington (1648–1718)
- Randolph Clayton (d. 1684)
- Sir William Gore, Bt (d. c. 1703)
- Sir John Cole, Bt (d. c. 1691)
- William Hill (d. 1693)

=== 1676 ===
- Thomas Ratcliff
- Sir James Cuffe (d. 1678)
- Sir Thomas Newcomen, Bt (d. 1689)
- Sir Cyril Wyche (c. 1632–1707)

=== 1677 ===
–

=== 1678 ===
- John Vesey (1638–1716)
- Sir Robert Colville (died 1697)

=== 1679 ===
- John Parker (d. 1681)
- John Keatinge (removed 1689)

=== 1680 ===
- Henry Hene (d. 1708)

=== 1681 ===
- Sir Joseph Williamson (1633–1701)
- Sir William Davys (c. 1633–1687)

=== 1682 ===
- William Moreton (1641–1715)
- Anthony Dopping (1643–1697)
- Sir Richard Reynell, Bt (1626–1699)
- Francis Marsh (1627–1693)
- Sir John Davys (d. 1689)

=== Admitted during the reign of Charles II ===
- Sir Oliver St George, Bt (by 1640–1695)

== James II, 1685–1688 ==
=== 1685 ===
- Alexander MacDonnell, 3rd Earl of Antrim (1615–1699)
- Vere Cromwell, 4th Earl of Ardglass (1625–1687)
- Henry Hamilton-Moore, 3rd Earl of Drogheda (d. 1714)
- Sir Charles Feilding (1644–1722)
- Robert FitzGerald (1637–1698)
- Adam Loftus, 1st Viscount Lisburne (d. 1691)
- Lemuel Kingdon (c. 1654–1686)
- Hugh Montgomery, 2nd Earl of Mount Alexander (1651–1717)
- Henry O'Brien, 7th Earl of Thomond (c. 1620–1691)
- Sir Robert Hamilton, Bt (d. 1703)
- John Bellew (d. 1692)

=== 1686 ===
- Sir Charles Porter (1631–1696)
- Jenico Preston, 7th Viscount Gormanston (1643–1691)
- Thomas Nugent (d. 1715) (removed 1690)

=== 1687 ===
- Sir Alexander Fitton (c. 1630–1698)
- Garret Moore (d. 1706)
- Sir Stephen Rice (1637–1715)
- Simon Luttrell (1654–1698)

=== 1688 ===
- Francis Plowden (c.1644–1712)
- Sir John Trevor (1627–1717)

=== Admitted in 1689 by James II ===
- Thomas FitzWilliam, 4th Viscount FitzWilliam (c.1640–1704)
- Nicholas Netterville, 3rd Viscount Netterville (d. 1689)
- Matthew Plunkett, 7th Baron Louth (d. 1689)
- Sir William Talbot, 3rd Baronet (c.1643–1691)
- Sir William Ellis (d. 1732)

== William and Mary, 1689–1694 ==
=== 1689 ===
–

=== 1690 ===
- Sir Henry Fane (c. 1650–1706)
- Edward Brabazon, 4th Earl of Meath (c. 1638–1708)
- John Hely (d. 1701)
- Richard Pyne (d. 1709)
- James Butler, 2nd Duke of Ormonde (1665–1745) (attainted 1715)
- Sir Robert Southwell (d. 1702)
- Sir William Talbot, Bt (c. 1643–1691) (attainted 1691)
- John Skeffington, 2nd Viscount Massereene (d. 1695)

=== 1691 ===
- Edward FitzGerald-Villiers (c. 1652–1693)

=== 1692 ===
- Francis Robartes (1650–1718)
- Thomas Keightley (c. 1650–1719)
- Henry de Massue, 2nd Marquis de Ruvigny later 1st Earl of Galway (1648–1720)
- Robert Smith (1670–1695)

=== 1693 ===
- Thomas Coningsby, 1st Baron Coningsby later 1st Earl Coningsby (1657–1729)

== William III, 1694–1702 ==
=== 1694 ===
- Narcissus Marsh (1638–1713)
- Michael Hill (1672–1699)

=== 1695 ===
- Sir Arthur Rawdon, Bt (1662–1695)
- Sir Robert King, Bt (c. 1625–1707)
- Sir Christopher Wandesford, Bt (1656–1707)
- Robert Doyne (1651–1733)
- Thomas Brodrick (1654–1730) (removed 1711 but restored 1714)
- Sir John Hanmer, Bt (c. 1625–1701)
- Charles Coote, 3rd Earl of Mountrath (c. 1655–1709)
- Richard Aldworth (1646–1707)
- Charles Boyle, 2nd Earl of Burlington (1660–1704)

=== 1696 ===
- William Wolseley (1640–1697)
- William Berkeley, 4th Baron Berkeley of Stratton (d. 1741)
- William Steuart (1652–1726)

=== 1697 ===
- John Methuen (c. 1649–1706)
- Robert Molesworth (1656–1725) (removed 1714 but re-instated 1719)
- Richard Tennison (c. 1640–1705)

=== 1701 ===
- Sir Richard Cox, Bt (1650–1733)
- Henry Petty, 2nd Baron Shelburne later 1st Earl of Shelburne (1675–1751)
- Thomas Erle (c. 1650–1720)
- Francis Gwyn (c. 1648–1734)
- Edward Smyth (1665–1720)

=== Admitted by 1702 ===
- William O'Brien, 3rd Earl of Inchiquin (c. 1662–1719)
- Ambrose Aungier, 2nd Earl of Longford (c. 1649–1705)
- St George Ashe (c. 1658–1718)
- Sir John Hely (d. 1701)
- Philip Savage (1644–1717)
- Richard Coote
- Robert Rochfort (1652–1727)
- Sir Walter Plunket
- Sir Thomas Pakenham (1649–1706)
- William Neve
- John Pulteney (c. 1668–1726)

== Anne II, 1702–1714 ==
=== 1702 ===
- Edward Southwell (1671–1730)
- Richard Freeman (d. 1710)

=== 1703 ===
- Alan Brodrick (1656–1728) (removed 1711 but restored 1714)
- William King (1650–1729)

=== 1704 ===
- Henry Boyle (1669–1725)
- John Perceval (1683–1748)

=== 1705 ===
- John Cutts, 1st Baron Cutts (c. 1661–1707)

=== 1706 ===
- Thomas Bligh (1654–1710)

=== 1707 ===
- George Dodington (c. 1662–1720)

=== 1708 ===
- Joseph Addison (1672–1719)

=== 1709 ===
- Sir Constantine Phipps (1656–1723)

=== 1710 ===
- Christopher Wandesford, 2nd Viscount Castlecomer (1684–1719)
- Gustavus Hamilton (c. 1640–1723)
- Sir Thomas Southwell, Bt (1665–1720)
- Robert Fitzgerald, 19th Earl of Kildare (1675–1744)
- Chambre Brabazon, 5th Earl of Meath (c. 1645–1715)
- William Conolly (1662–1729) (removed in 1711 but restored in 1721)
- William Stewart, 2nd Viscount Mountjoy (d. 1728)

=== Admitted by 1710 ===
- Pierce Butler, 4th Viscount Ikerrin (1679–1711)

=== Admitted by April 1711 ===
- Sir Donough O'Brien, Bt (1642–1717)
- Richard Ingoldsby (by 1651–1712)
- Thomas Fairfax (d. 1713)
- Theophilus Butler (c. 1669–1724)
- Charles Dering (1656–1719)
- Thomas Fitzmaurice (1668–1742)
- James Hamilton, 6th Earl of Abercorn (1661–1734)
- Welbore Ellis (c. 1651–1734)
- Charles Coote, 4th Earl of Mountrath (c. 1680–1715)

=== 1711 ===
- Arthur Annesley, 5th Earl of Anglesey (c. 1678–1737)
- Samuel Dopping (1671–1720)

=== Admitted by 1711 ===
- Sir William Robinson (1645–1712)
- Thomas Blyth
- John Forster (1668–1720)
- William Caulfield (1665–1737)

=== 1712 ===
- Thomas Lindsay (1656–1724)
- Sir Pierce Butler, Bt (1670–1732)
- Charles O'Neill (1676–1716)

=== 1713 ===
- Benjamin Parry (1672–1736)
- Sir John Stanley, Bt (1663–1744)

== George I, 1714–1727 ==
=== 1714 ===
- James Barry, 4th Earl of Barrymore (1667–1748)
- Sir William St Quintin, 3rd Baronet (c. 1662–1723)
- Henry O'Brien, 8th Earl of Thomond (1688–1741)
- John Allen (1661–1726)
- Joseph Deane (1674–1715)
- Oliver St George (1661–1731)
- Sir Henry Tichborne, Bt (1663–1731)
- John Sterne (1660–1745)
- William Whitshed (1679–1727)
- Sir Ralph Gore, Bt (1675–1733)
- Sir Gustavus Hume, Bt (c. 1670–1731)
- Sir Edward Crofton, Bt (c. 1662–1729)
- Henry Barry, 3rd Baron Barry of Santry (1680–1734)
- Charles O'Hara, 1st Baron Tyrawley (c. 1640–1724)

=== 1715 ===
- Thomas Meredyth (b. after 1661–1719)
- Francis Palmes (b. by 1663–1719)
- John Moore (b. by 1676–1725)
- Richard Boyle, 3rd Earl of Burlington (1694–1753)
- Jeffrey Gilbert (d. 1726)
- Richard FitzWilliam, 5th Viscount FitzWilliam (c. 1677–1743)
- Richard FitzPatrick, 1st Baron Gowran (c. 1662–1727)
- Arthur St Leger, 1st Viscount Doneraile (1657–1727)
- Frederick Hamilton (c. 1663–1715)
- Martin Bladen (1682–1746)
- Arthur Cole, 1st Baron Ranelagh (1664–1754)
- William Ponsonby (1659–1724)
- George Evans, 1st Baron Carbery (c. 1680–1749)
- Thomas Knox (d. 1728)
- George St George, 1st Baron St George (c. 1658–1735)
- Richard St George (1657–1726)

=== 1716 ===
- James Tynte (1682–1758)
- Chaworth Brabazon, 6th Earl of Meath (1686–1763)
- John Evans (b. by 1660–1724)
- Edward Synge (1659–1741)

=== By 1716 ===
- Heneage Finch, 1st Earl of Aylesford (c. 1649–1719)

=== 1717 ===
- Edward Webster (b. by 1691–1755)
- George Evans (1655–1720)
- Matthew Moreton (1663–1735)
- Philip Wharton, 2nd Marquess of Wharton later 1st Duke of Wharton (1698–1731) (removed 1726)
- Trevor Hill, 1st Viscount Hillsborough (1693–1742)

=== 1718 ===
- Charles Fane, 1st Viscount Fane (1676–1744)
- Henry Coote, 5th Earl of Mountrath (1684–1720)
- Richard Tighe (1678–1736)

=== 1719 ===
–

=== 1720 ===
–

=== 1721 ===
- Sir Richard Levinge, Bt (1656–1724)
- Viscount Forbes (1685–1765)
- Richard Boyle, 2nd Viscount Shannon (c. 1675–1740)
- Edward Hopkins (1675–1736)
- John Villiers, 5th Viscount Grandison later 1st Earl Grandison (c. 1682–1766)

=== 1722 ===
- Marmaduke Coghill (1673–1739)
- Bernard Hale (1677–1729)

=== 1723 ===
- Algernon Coote, 6th Earl of Mountrath (1689–1744)

=== By 1723 ===
- Charles Lennox, 1st Duke of Richmond (1672–1723)
- Thomas Howard, 6th Baron Howard of Effingham (1682–1725)
- George Cholmondeley, 1st Baron Newborough, later 2nd Earl of Cholmondeley (1666–1733)
- Thomas Pitt, 1st Baron Londonderry later 1st Earl of Londonderry (c. 1688–1729)
- Stephen Stanley

=== 1724 ===
- Henry Downes (d. 1735)
- St John Brodrick (c. 1685–1728)
- James O'Hara, 2nd Baron Tyrawley (1682–1773)
- Theophilus Bolton (d. 1744)
- Thomas Clutterbuck (1697–1742)
- Hugh Boulter (1672–1742)
- Thomas Wyndham (1681–1745)

=== 1725 ===
- Richard West (c. 1691–1726)
- Thomas Dalton (d. 1730)

=== 1726 ===
- Brinsley Butler, 2nd Baron Newtown-Butler later 1st Viscount Lanesborough (1670–1736)
- Sir Thomas Taylor, Bt (1662–1736)
- William Caulfeild, 2nd Viscount Charlemont (d. 1726)
- Thomas Fitzmaurice, 1st Earl of Kerry (1668–1741)
- Thomas Southwell, 2nd Baron Southwell (1698–1766)
- Michael Burke, 10th Earl of Clanricarde (1686–1726)
- Owen Wynne (1665–1737)

== George II, 1727–1760 ==
=== 1727 ===
- Ralph Lambert (d. 1732)
- Brabazon Ponsonby, 2nd Viscount Duncannon later 1st Earl of Bessborough (1679–1758)
- Joshua Allen, 2nd Viscount Allen (1685–1742)
- John Rogerson (1676–1741)
- Henry Maxwell (1669–1730)
- Samuel Molyneux (1689–1728)
- Richard Edgcumbe (1680–1758)

=== 1728 ===
- James Reynolds (1684–1747)
- Francis Seymour-Conway, 1st Baron Conway (1679–1732)
- François de La Rochefoucauld, marquis de Montandre (1672–1739)

=== 1729 ===
- James King, 4th Baron Kingston (1693–1761)
- William St Lawrence, 14th Baron Howth (1688–1748)
- Richard Lambart, 4th Earl of Cavan (d. 1742)

=== 1730 ===
- John Hoadly (1678–1746)
- William James Conolly (1706–1754)
- Thomas Marlay (c. 1678–1756)

=== 1731 ===
- Walter Carey (1685–1757)

=== Admitted by 1731 ===
- Hugh Boscawen, 1st Viscount Falmouth (c. 1680–1734)
- David Creighton
- James Fynle

=== 1732 ===
- Edward Southwell (1705–1755)
- Thomas Carter (c. 1682–1763) (removed 1754 but reinstated 1755)

=== 1733 ===
- Henry Boyle (1682–1764)
- Sir Thomas Prendergast, Bt (c. 1700–1760)
- Sir Edward Crofton, Bt (1687–1739)
- Richard Molesworth, 3rd Viscount Molesworth (1680–1758)
- Sir Henry King, Bt (1680–1741)
- William Graham (1706–1749)
- Francis Burton (1696–1744)

=== 1734 ===
- Arthur Price (d. 1752)
- Charles Cobbe (d. 1765)
- Pattee Byng, 2nd Viscount Torrington (1699–1747)

=== 1735 ===
- Henry Bingham (1688–1743)
- William Flower, 1st Baron Castle Durrow (1685–1746)

=== 1736 ===
- Gustavus Hamilton, 2nd Viscount Boyne (1710–1746)

=== 1737 ===
- Thomas Watson-Wentworth, 1st Earl of Malton later 1st Marquess of Rockingham (1693–1750)
- Luke Gardiner (b. by 1690–1755)
- Edward Walpole (1706–1784)
- Thomas Pearce (b. after 1664–1739)

=== 1738 ===
–

=== 1739 ===
- Robert Napier (c. 1666–1739)
- James Hamilton, 7th Earl of Abercorn (1686–1744)
- Robert Jocelyn (c. 1688–1756)

=== 1740 ===
- Gervais Parker (c. 1679–1750)
- Henry Singleton (1682–1759)

=== 1741 ===
- Viscount Duncannon (1704–1793)

=== 1742 ===
- John Bowes (1691–1767)
- Henry Vane (c. 1705–1758)

=== 1743 ===
- Sir Compton Domvile, Bt (1696–1768)

=== 1744 ===
- Gerald de Courcy, 24th Baron Kingsale (1700–1759)

=== 1745 ===
- Richard Liddell (c. 1694–1746)

=== 1746 ===
- Somerset Butler, 8th Viscount Ikerrin later 1st Earl of Carrick (1719–1774)
- Richard Wingfield, 1st Viscount Powerscourt (1697–1751)
- Clotworthy Skeffington, 5th Viscount Massereene later 1st Earl of Massereene (d. 1757)
- James Hamilton, 1st Viscount of Limerick later 1st Earl of Clanbrassil (c. 1691–1758)
- William FitzMaurice, 2nd Earl of Kerry (1694–1747)
- James FitzGerald, 20th Earl of Kildare later 1st Duke of Leinster (1722–1773)
- William FitzWilliam, 3rd Earl FitzWilliam (1719–1756)
- Wills Hill, 2nd Viscount Hillsborough later 1st Marquess of Downshire (1718–1793)
- Charles Moore, 2nd Baron Moore later 1st Earl of Charleville (1712–1764)

=== 1747 ===
- George Stone (c. 1708–1764)
- Edward Weston (1703–1770)

=== 1748 ===
- Henry Conyngham (1705–1781)
- Josiah Hort (c. 1674–1751)
- Edward Moore, 5th Earl of Drogheda (1701–1758)
- Sir Compton Domvile, Bt (c. 1686–1768)
- Sir Arthur Gore, Bt (1703–1773)
- John Ponsonby (1713–1787) (removed 1770 but restored by 1774)
- William Stewart, 1st Earl of Blessington (1709–1769)

=== 1749 ===
- Humphrey Butler, 2nd Viscount Lanesborough later Earl of Lanesborough (c. 1700–1768)
- Robert Rochfort, 1st Baron Belfield later 1st Earl of Belvedere (1708–1772)

=== 1750 ===
- Francis Seymour-Conway, 2nd Baron Conway later 1st Marquess of Hertford (1718–1794)
- Arthur Hill, 1st Viscount Dungannon (c. 1694–1771)

=== 1751 ===
- Lord George Sackville (1716–1785) (removed 1760)
- Henry Maule (d. 1758)
- St George Caulfeild (1697–1778)
- Hayes St Leger, 4th Viscount Doneraile (1702–1767)

=== 1752 ===
–

=== 1753 ===
- William Bristow
- John Ryder (c. 1697–1775)
- Joseph Damer, 1st Baron Milton later 1st Earl of Dorchester (1718–1798)
- Sir William Yorke (c. 1700–1776)
- Nicholas Loftus, 1st Baron Loftus later 1st Viscount Loftus (1687–1763)
- William O'Brien, 4th Earl of Inchiquin (c. 1700–1777)
- Sir Thomas Taylor, Bt (1686–1757)

=== 1754 ===
- John Petty, 1st Earl of Shelburne (1706–1761)

=== 1755 ===
- Alexander Macdonnell, 5th Earl of Antrim (1713–1775)
- Thomas Bermingham, 15th Baron Athenry later 1st Earl of Louth (1717–1799) (removed 1770 but restored 1783)
- William Bristow (c. 1698–1758)
- Hercules Langford Rowley (1708–1794) (removed 1770 but restored 1782)
- Henry Seymour Conway (1719–1795)
- William Fortescue (1722–1806)
- Michael Cox (d. 1779)

=== 1756 ===
- James Hamilton, 8th Earl of Abercorn (1712–1789)
- John Leslie, 10th Earl of Rothes (c. 1698–1767)

=== 1757 ===
- Nathaniel Clements (1705–1777)
- Edward Willes (d. 1768)
- Richard Rigby (1722–1788)
- Anthony Malone (1700–1776)

=== 1758 ===
- John Proby, 1st Baron Carysfort (1720–1772)
- Robert Jocelyn, 2nd Viscount Jocelyn later 1st Earl of Roden (1731–1797)
- William Carmichael (d. 1765)
- Charles Gardiner (1720–1769)
- Thomas Nugent, 6th Earl of Westmeath (1714–1792) (removed 1771 but restored 1774)

=== 1759 ===
–

== George III, 1760–1820 ==
=== 1760 ===
- Charles Moore, 6th Earl of Drogheda later 1st Marquess of Drogheda (1730–1822)
- Robert Maxwell, 2nd Viscount Farnham later 1st Earl of Farnham (c. 1720–1779)
- Benjamin Burton (1709–1767)

=== 1761 ===
- Francis Andrews (1718–1774)
- Thomas Conolly (1738–1803)
- William Cavendish, 4th Duke of Devonshire (1720–1764)
- Charles Coote, 7th Earl of Mountrath (1725–1802)
- Richard Aston (d. 1778)
- John Smith de Burgh, 11th Earl of Clanricarde (1720–1782) (removed 1761)
- Sir William Fownes, Bt (1709–1778) (removed 1770)
- William Gerard Hamilton (1729–1796)
- Warden Flood (1694–1764)

=== 1762 ===
- Sir James Caldwell, Bt (c. 1722–1784)

=== 1763 ===
- Viscount Boyle (1728–1807) (removed 1770 but restored 1774)
- George Beresford, 2nd Earl of Tyrone later 1st Marquess of Waterford (1735–1800)

=== 1764 ===
- Philip Tisdall (1703–1777)
- Nicholas Hume-Loftus, 2nd Viscount Loftus later 1st Earl of Ely (1714–1766)
- John Gore (1718–1784)
- John Hely-Hutchinson (1724–1794)

=== 1765 ===
- Richard Robinson (c. 1708–1794)
- Richard Clayton (d. 1770)
- Brinsley Butler, 2nd Earl of Lanesborough (1728–1779) (removed 1770 but reinstated 1774)
- Francis Seymour-Conway (1743–1822)
- Anthony Foster (1705–1779)

=== 1766 ===
- William Crosbie, 2nd Baron Brandon later 1st Earl of Glandore (1716–1781)
- Sir William Mayne, Bt (1722–1794) (removed 1770)
- William Brownlow (1726–1794)
- Augustus Hervey (1724–1779)
- Richard Fitzwilliam, 6th Viscount Fitzwilliam (1711–1776)
- Owen Wynne (1723–1789)
- James Hamilton, 2nd Earl of Clanbrassil (1730–1798)
- William Pole (b. by 1727–1781) (removed 1771)

=== 1767 ===
- Theophilus Jones (1729–1811)
- Henry Maxwell (c. 1720–1798)
- Arthur Upton (1715–1768)
- Frederick Hervey (1730–1803)
- Lord Frederick Campbell (1729–1816)
- Arthur Smyth (d. 1771)

=== 1768 ===
- James Hewitt, 1st Baron Lifford later 1st Viscount Lifford (1712–1789)
- Thomas St Lawrence, 1st Earl of Howth (1730–1801)
- John Beresford (1738–1805)
- Sir Henry Cavendish, Bt (1707–1776)
- Sir Robert Deane, Bt (1707–1770)
- Sir Thomas Maude (1726–1777)
- Robert Nugent, 1st Viscount Clare later 1st Earl Nugent (1702–1788)
- Arthur Chichester, 5th Earl of Donegall later 1st Marquess of Donegall (1739–1799)

=== 1769 ===
- George Macartney (1737–1806)

=== 1770 ===
- Sir Archibald Acheson (1718–1790)
- James Fortescue (1725–1782)
- Henry King (1733–1821)
- Joseph Leeson, 1st Earl of Milltown (1711–1783)
- Ralph Howard (c. 1726–1789)
- Edward Cary (c. 1716–1797)
- Sir William Osborne, Bt (c. 1722–1783)
- Sir Arthur Brooke, Bt (1726–1785)
- Marcus Paterson (1712–1787)

=== 1771 ===
- Silver Oliver (1736–1798)
- Edmund Pery (1719–1806)
- Henry Loftus, 4th Viscount Loftus later 1st Earl of Ely (1709–1783)
- Viscount Sudley (1734–1809)

=== 1772 ===
- John Cradock (c. 1708–1778)
- John Blaquiere (1732–1812)
- George Forbes, 5th Earl of Granard (1740–1780)

=== 1773 ===
–

=== 1774 ===
- Charles Coote (1738–1800)

=== 1775 ===
- George Eliott (1717–1790)
- Sir John Irwin (c. 1728–1788)
- James Stopford, 2nd Earl of Courtown (1731–1810)
- Henry Flood (1732–1791) (removed 1782 but restored 1782)

=== 1776 ===
- Jemmett Browne (d. 1782)
- Arthur Annesley, 8th Viscount Valentia later 1st Earl of Mountnorris (1744–1816)
- Sir Capel Molyneux, Bt (1717–1797)
- Agmondisham Vesey (1708–1785)
- Garret Wellesley, 1st Earl of Mornington (1735–1784)
- Joshua Cooper (1732–1800)

=== 1777 ===
- Sir Richard Heron (1726–1805)
- Thomas Waite (1718–1780)
- William FitzGerald, 2nd Duke of Leinster (1749–1804)
- Sir Robert Deane, Bt (1745–1818)
- Edward Pakenham, 2nd Baron Longford (1743–1792)
- John Pomeroy (1724–1790)
- William Burton (1733–1796)
- Henry Theophilus Clements (1734–1795)
- James Dennis (1721–1782)
- Richard Jackson (c. 1729–1789)
- Walter Hussey Burgh (1742–1783)
- John Scott (1739–1798)

=== 1778 ===
–

=== 1779 ===
- Robert Fowler (c. 1726–1801)
- John Foster (1740–1828)
- Sir Henry Cavendish, Bt (1732–1804)
- Charles Agar (1736–1809)

=== 1780 ===
- William Eden (1744–1814)
- Murrough O'Brien, 5th Earl of Inchiquin later 1st Marquess of Thomond (1726–1808)
- Luke Gardiner (1745–1798)

=== 1781 ===
- John O'Neill (1740–1798)
- Denis Daly (1748–1791)

=== 1782 ===
- Richard FitzPatrick (1748–1813)
- John Burgoyne (1723–1792)
- Robert Cuninghame (1726–1801)
- Barry Yelverton (1736–1805)
- William Grenville (1759–1834)
- Joseph Deane Bourke (d. 1794)
- James Cuffe (b. by 1747–1821)

=== 1783 ===
- Henry de Burgh, 12th Earl of Clanricarde later 1st Marquess of Clanricarde (1743–1797)
- William Windham (1750–1810)
- Charles Loftus (1738–1806)
- James Caulfeild, 1st Earl of Charlemont (1728–1799)
- Thomas Pelham (1756–1826)
- Henry Grattan (1746–1820) (expelled 1798 but re-admitted 1806)
- George Ogle (1742–1814)
- Robert Stewart (1739–1821)
- John Fitzgibbon (1748–1802)
- Thomas Kelly (1724–1809)

=== 1784 ===
- Thomas Orde (1740–1807)
- Richard Wellesley, 2nd Earl of Mornington later 1st Marquess Wellesley (1760–1842)
- William Augustus Pitt (1728–1809)
- William Ponsonby (1744–1806)
- James Agar, 1st Viscount Clifden (1735–1788)

=== 1785 ===
- John Crosbie, 2nd Earl of Glandore (1753–1815)
- Thomas Taylour, 1st Earl of Bective (1724–1795)
- David La Touche (1729–1817)
- Sir Skeffington Smyth, Bt (1745–1797)
- George Mason-Villiers, 2nd Earl Grandison (1751–1800)
- Stephen Moore, 1st Earl Mount Cashell (1730–1790)
- John Browne, 3rd Earl of Altamont later 1st Marquess of Sligo (1756–1809)
- John Monck Mason (1726–1809)

=== 1786 ===
- Sir John Parnell, Bt (1744–1801)
- Sir Lucius O'Brien, Bt (1731–1795)
- Charles Dillon-Lee (1745–1813)
- Randal MacDonnell, 6th Earl of Antrim later 1st Marquess of Antrim (1789 creation) (1749–1791)
- Viscount Luttrell (1743–1821)

=== 1787 ===
- Hugh Carleton (1739–1826)
- Alleyne FitzHerbert (1753–1839)

=== 1788 ===
–

=== 1789 ===
- Robert Hobart, 4th Earl of Buckinghamshire (1760–1816)
- Arthur Wolfe (1739–1803)
- John Armstrong (1732–1791)
- George Agar (1754–1815)
- John Proby, 1st Earl of Carysfort (1751–1828)
- James Fitzgerald (1742–1835)

=== 1790 ===
- Richard Longfield (1734–1811)

=== 1791 ===
–

=== 1792 ===
- George Warde (d. 1803)
- Sir Hercules Langrishe, Bt (1729–1811)

=== 1793 ===
- George Nugent, 7th Earl of Westmeath (1760–1814)
- Charles Fitzgerald (1756–1810)
- William Forward-Howard (1761–1818)
- Arthur Acheson, 2nd Viscount Gosford later 1st Earl of Gosford (c. 1745–1807)
- George Lewis Jones (d. 1804)
- Arthur Hill, 2nd Marquess of Downshire (1753–1801) (removed 1800)

=== 1794 ===
- Edward King, 1st Earl of Kingston (1726–1797)
- Denis Browne (c. 1760–1828)
- Sylvester Douglas (1743–1823)
- John Hamilton, 1st Marquess of Abercorn (1756–1818)
- William Beresford (1743–1819)

=== 1795 ===
- Viscount Milton (1746–1808)
- John Dawson, 1st Earl of Portarlington (1744–1798)
- William Newcome (1729–1800)
- Robert Ross (1729–1799)
- Robert Dillon, 1st Baron Clonbrock (1754–1795)
- Isaac Corry (1752–1813)

=== 1796 ===
- Barry Maxwell, 1st Earl of Farnham (1723–1800)
- Sackville Hamilton (1732–1818)
- Lodge de Montmorency (1747–1822)
- Richard Hely-Hutchinson, 2nd Baron Donoughmore later 1st Earl of Donoughmore (1756–1825)

=== 1797 ===
- Edmund Pery, 2nd Baron Glentworth later 1st Earl of Limerick (1758–1844)
- Walter Butler, 18th Earl of Ormonde later 1st Marquess of Ormonde (1770–1820)
- Viscount Castlereagh (1769–1822)
- Robert Jocelyn, 2nd Earl of Roden (1756–1820)

=== 1798 ===
- Sir Ralph Abercromby (1734–1801)
- Richard Annesley (1745–1824)
- John Toler (1745–1831)

=== 1799 ===
- Thomas O'Beirne (c. 1748–1823)

=== 1800 ===
- William Stuart (1755–1822)
- St George Daly (1758–1829)
- John Stewart (1757–1825)
- Charles Coote (1754–1823)
- Viscount Loftus (1770–1845)

=== 1801 ===
- John Ormsby Vandeleur (c. 1765–1828)
- Maurice Fitzgerald (1774–1849)
- William Handcock, 1st Viscount Castlemaine (1761–1839)
- John de Burgh, 13th Earl of Clanricarde (1744–1808)
- John Staples (1736–1820)
- Henry Beresford, 2nd Marquess of Waterford (1772–1826)
- Sir William Medows (1738–1813)
- Sir Michael Smith, Bt (1740–1808)
- Charles Abbot (1757–1829)
- Robert Ward (1754–1831)

=== 1802 ===
- Charles Brodrick (1761–1822)
- Robert Clements, 1st Earl of Leitrim (1732–1804)
- Sir John Mitford (1748–1830)
- William Wickham (1761–1840)

=== 1803 ===
- George Chichester, 2nd Marquess of Donegall (1769–1844)
- Henry Edward Fox (1755–1811)
- Standish O'Grady (1766–1840)
- William Downes (1751–1826)
- William Cathcart, 10th Lord Cathcart later 1st Earl Cathcart (1755–1843)

=== 1804 ===
- Sir Evan Nepean, Bt (1752–1822)
- Charles Lindsay (1760–1846)
- John Creighton, 1st Earl Erne (1731–1828)

=== 1805 ===
- Sir Lawrence Parsons, Bt (1758–1841)
- George Knox (1765–1827)
- Charles Long (1760–1838)
- William Plunket (1764–1854)

=== 1806 ===
- William Elliot (1766–1818)
- George Ponsonby (1755–1817)
- George Forbes, 6th Earl of Granard (1760–1837)
- Denis Bowes Daly (1745–1821)
- Lord Henry FitzGerald (1761–1829)
- Sir John Newport, Bt (1756–1843)
- John Philpot Curran (1750–1817)
- Charles Stanhope, 3rd Earl of Harrington (1753–1829)

=== 1807 ===
- Sir Arthur Wellesley (1769–1852)
- Thomas Manners-Sutton, 1st Baron Manners (1756–1842)
- William Saurin (1757–1839)

=== 1808 ===
- Patrick Duigenan (1735–1816)
- Sir George Hill, Bt (1763–1839)

=== 1809 ===
- William O'Brien, 2nd Marquess of Thomond (c. 1765–1846)
- William Bagwell (1776–1826)
- Charles O'Neill, 1st Earl O'Neill (1779–1841)
- Charles Vereker (1768–1842)
- John Maxwell-Barry (1767–1838)
- Richard Trench, 2nd Earl of Clancarty (1767–1837)
- Robert Dundas (1771–1851)
- Henry Boyle, 3rd Earl of Shannon (1771–1842)
- Thomas Skeffington (1772–1843)
- Euseby Cleaver (1746–1819)
- William Wellesley-Pole (1763–1845)
- Howe Browne, 2nd Marquess of Sligo (1788–1845)

=== 1810 ===
- William FitzGerald (c. 1782–1843)
- John Bourke, 4th Earl of Mayo (1766–1849)

=== 1811 ===
–

=== 1812 ===
- John Hope (1765–1823)
- Robert Peel (1788–1850)

=== 1813 ===
- John Preston, 1st Baron Tara (1764–1821)
- Sir George Hewett, Bt (1750–1840)

=== 1814 ===
- Sir William McMahon, Bt (1776–1837)

=== 1815 ===
–

=== 1816 ===
- Sir George Beckwith (1753–1823)

=== 1817 ===
- Nicholas Vansittart (1766–1851)

=== 1818 ===
- John Radcliff (1765–1843)
- Charles Grant (1778–1866)

=== 1819 ===
–

== George IV, 1820–1830 ==
=== 1820 ===
- Sir David Baird (1757–1829)
- Lord John Beresford (1773–1862)
- Power Le Poer Trench (1770–1839)

=== 1821 ===
- Henry Goulburn (1784–1856)

=== 1822 ===
- Charles Kendal Bushe (1767–1843)
- Sir Samuel Auchmuty (1756–1822)
- William Magee (1766–1831)
- Richard Laurence (1760–1838)
- Stapleton Cotton, 1st Baron Combermere later 1st Viscount Combermere (1773–1865)

=== 1823 ===
- Nathaniel Alexander (1760–1840)

=== 1824 ===
–

=== 1825 ===
- Sir George Murray (1772–1846)

=== 1826 ===
–

=== 1827 ===
- Henry Joy (d. 1838)
- William Lamb (1779–1848)
- Sir Anthony Hart (c. 1754–1831)

=== 1828 ===
- Sir John Byng (1772–1860)
- Lord Francis Leveson-Gower (1800–1857)

=== 1829 ===
–

== William IV, 1830–1837 ==
=== 1830 ===
- Sir Henry Hardinge (1785–1856)
- John Doherty (1783–1850)

=== 1831 ===
- Francis Blackburne (1782–1867)
- Edward Smith-Stanley (1799–1869)
- Thomas Spring Rice (1790–1866)
- Valentine Lawless, 2nd Baron Cloncurry (1773–1853)
- Augustus FitzGerald, 3rd Duke of Leinster (1791–1874)
- Sir Hussey Vivian, Bt (1775–1842)
- Richard Whately (1787–1863)

=== 1832 ===
- Francis Caulfeild, 2nd Earl of Charlemont (1775–1863)

=== 1833 ===
- John Brabazon, 10th Earl of Meath (1772–1851)
- Edward Littleton (1791–1863)

=== 1834 ===
- Lord Killeen (1791–1869)
- Nathaniel Clements, 2nd Earl of Leitrim (1768–1854)
- Dominick Browne (1787–1860)
- Valentine Browne, 2nd Earl of Kenmare (1788–1853)
- John Hely-Hutchinson, 3rd Earl of Donoughmore (1787–1851)

=== 1835 ===
- Sir Edward Sugden (1781–1875)
- Frederick Shaw (1799–1876)
- William Gregory (1762–1840)
- Thomas Langlois Lefroy (1776–1869)
- Louis Perrin (1782–1864)
- Cornelius O'Callaghan, 1st Viscount Lismore (1775–1857)
- Thomas Taylour, 2nd Marquess of Headfort (1787–1870)
- Viscount Morpeth (1802–1864)
- Michael O'Loghlen (1789–1842)

=== 1836 ===
- Sir Edward Blakeney (1778–1868)
- John Richards (1790–1872)
- Richard Talbot, 2nd Baron Talbot de Malahide (1766–1849)
- Anthony Richard Blake (1785–1849)

== Victoria, 1837–1901 ==
=== 1837 ===
- Henry Villiers-Stuart (1803–1874)
- Charles Brownlow (1795–1847)
- Stephen Woulfe (1787–1840)
- Thomas Francis Kennedy (1788–1879)

=== 1838 ===
- Sir Patrick Bellew, Bt (1798–1866)
- Nicholas Ball (1791–1865)

=== 1839 ===
- Arthur Moore (1765–1846)
- Maziere Brady (1796–1871)
- Stephen Sandes (1778–1842)

=== 1840 ===
- David Richard Pigot (c. 1803–1873)

=== 1841 ===
- Charles Dickenson (1795–1842)
- John Campbell, 1st Baron Campbell (1779–1861)
- George Hampden Evans (d. 1842)
- James Grattan (1783–1854)
- Lord Eliot (1798–1877)
- Edward Pennefather (c. 1774–1847)

=== 1842 ===
- Thomas Cusack-Smith (1795–1866)
- Edward Stopford (d. 1850)

=== 1843 ===
- Richard Keatinge (1793–1876)

=== 1844 ===
–

=== 1845 ===
- Sir Thomas Fremantle, Bt (1798–1890)
- Edward Lucas (1787–1871)

=== 1846 ===
- Richard Wilson Greene (d. 1861)
- Earl of Lincoln (1811–1864)
- Richard Moore (d. 1857)
- Henry Labouchere (1798–1869)
- Alexander Macdonnell (1794–1875)
- Thomas Plunket (1792–1866)
- Sir Thomas Esmonde, Bt (1786–1868)
- William Tighe (1794–1878)

=== 1847 ===
- Sir William Somerville, Bt (1802–1873)

=== 1848 ===
- John FitzPatrick (1811–1883)
- James Henry Monahan (1803–1878)

=== 1849 ===
–

=== 1850 ===
- Thomas Stewart Townsend (1801–1852)
- John Hatchell (1788–1870)

=== 1851 ===
–

=== 1852 ===
- Lord Naas (1822–1872)
- Joseph Napier (1804–1882)

=== 1853 ===
- John Wynne (1801–1865)
- Joseph Henderson Singer (1786–1866)
- Sir John Young, Bt (1807–1876)
- Abraham Brewster (1796–1874)

=== 1854 ===
–

=== 1855 ===
- John Colborne, 1st Baron Seaton (1778–1863)
- William Keogh (1817–1878)
- Edward Horsman (1807–1876)

=== 1856 ===
- John FitzGerald (1816–1889)

=== 1857 ===
- Henry Arthur Herbert (d. 1866)

=== 1858 ===
- James Whiteside (1804–1876)
- Robert Jocelyn, 3rd Earl of Roden (1788–1870)
- Philip Cecil Crampton (1782–1862)
- Henry Moore, 3rd Marquess of Drogheda (1825–1892)

=== 1859 ===
- Edward Cardwell (1813–1886)

=== 1860 ===
- Rickard Deasy (1812–1883)
- Sir George Brown (1790–1865)

=== 1861 ===
- Thomas O'Hagan (1812–1885)
- Sir Robert Peel, Bt (1822–1895)

=== 1862 ===
- Marcus Beresford (1801–1885)

=== 1863 ===
–

=== 1864 ===
- Richard Chenevix Trench (1807–1886)

=== 1865 ===
- James Anthony Lawson (1817–1887)
- Sir Hugh Rose (1801–1885)

=== 1866 ===
- Chichester Parkinson-Fortescue (1823–1898)
- Fitzstephen French (1801–1873)
- William H. F. Cogan (1823–1894)
- John Edward Walsh (1816–1869)
- John George (1804–1871)
- Major-General Francis Plunkett Dunne (d. 1874)
- Michael Morris (1826–1901)
- Samuel Butcher (1811–1876)

=== 1867 ===
- Hedges Eyre Chatterton (1819–1910)
- Mountifort Longfield (1802–1884)
- Jonathan Christian (1808–1887)
- Somerset Lowry-Corry, 4th Earl Belmore (1835–1913)
- Robert Warren (1817–1897)

=== 1868 ===
- Albert Edward, Prince of Wales (1841–1910)
- Prince George, 2nd Duke of Cambridge (1819–1904)
- John Wilson-Patten (1802–1892)
- Edward Litton (1787–1870)
- Sir Thomas Larcom, Bt (1801–1879)
- John Thomas Ball (1815–1898)
- Edward Sullivan (1822–1885)

=== 1869 ===
- Sir Walter Crofton (1815–1897)
- Charles Monck, 4th Viscount Monck (1819–1894)

=== 1870 ===
- Charles Robert Barry (1824–1897)
- Sir William Mansfield (1819–1876)
- George Alexander Hamilton (1802–1871)

=== 1871 ===
- Marquess of Hartington (1833–1908)
- William Henry Gregory (1817–1892)

=== 1872 ===
- Richard Dowse (1824–1890)
- Christopher Palles (1831–1920)

=== 1873 ===
–

=== 1874 ===
- Hugh Law (1818–1883)
- Sir Michael Hicks-Beach, Bt (1837–1916)
- William Brooke (1796–1881)

=== 1875 ===
- Henry Ormsby (1812–1887)
- Sir John Michel (1804–1886)
- George Augustus Chichester May (1815–1892)

=== 1876 ===
- Stephen Woulfe Flanagan (1817–1891)

=== 1877 ===
- Edward Gibson (1837–1913)

=== 1878 ===
- James Lowther (1840–1904)

=== 1879 ===
- Gerald FitzGibbon (1837–1909)
- Charles FitzGerald, 4th Duke of Leinster (1819–1887)
- William Brabazon, 11th Earl of Meath (1803–1887)
- John Beresford, 5th Marquess of Waterford (1844–1895)
- Thomas Taylour, 3rd Marquess of Headfort (1822–1894)

=== 1880 ===
- Henry Bruen (1828–1912)
- William Edward Forster (1818–1886)
- Sir Thomas Montagu Steele (1820–1890)

=== 1881 ===
- Charles Owen O'Conor, O'Conor Don (1838–1906)
- William Moore Johnson (1828–1918)

=== 1882 ===
- George Trevelyan (1838–1928 )

=== 1883 ===
- Andrew Porter (1837–1919)

=== 1884 ===
- John Naish (1841–1890)

=== 1885 ===
- Sir Henry Campbell-Bannerman (1836–1908)
- Samuel Walker (1832–1911)
- Sir Patrick Joseph Keenan (1826–1894)
- Hugh Holmes (1840–1916)
- Sir William Hart Dyke, Bt (1837–1931)
- Prince Edward of Saxe-Weimar (1823–1902)

=== 1886 ===
- Arthur MacMurrough Kavanagh (1831–1889)
- W. H. Smith (1825–1891)
- Edward King-Harman (1838–1888)
- John Monroe (1839–1899)
- John Morley (1838–1923)
- Sir John Lentaigne (1803–1886)
- John Young (1826–1915)

=== 1887 ===
- Arthur Balfour (1848–1930)
- John George Gibson (1846–1923)
- Reginald Brabazon, 12th Earl of Meath (1841–1929 )
- Sir Redvers Buller (1839–1908)
- Ion Hamilton (1839–1898)
- James Hamilton, 2nd Duke of Abercorn (1838–1913)

=== 1888 ===
- Peter O'Brien (1842–1914)
- Edward Leeson, 6th Earl of Milltown (1835–1890)
- Gerald FitzGerald, 5th Duke of Leinster (1851–1893)

=== 1889 ===
- Sir Henry Bruce, Bt (1820–1907)
- William Brownlow Forde (1823–1902)
- Sir West Ridgeway (1844–1930)
- Dodgson Hamilton Madden (1840–1928)

=== 1890 ===
- James Murphy (1826–1901)
- William O'Brien (1832–1899)
- William Wentworth FitzWilliam Dick (1805–1892)
- Garnet Wolseley, 1st Viscount Wolseley (1833–1913)

=== 1891 ===
- William Jackson (1840–1917)

=== 1892 ===
- John Atkinson (1844–1932)
- Hugh Hyacinth O'Rorke MacDermot, The MacDermot (1834–1904)
- Arthur Plunkett, 11th Earl of Fingall (1859–1929)
- Charles Vane-Tempest-Stewart, 6th Marquess of Londonderry (1852–1915)

=== 1893 ===
- Thomas Alexander Dickson (1833–1909)
- Joseph Meade (1839–1900)
- Christopher Talbot Redington (1847–1899)

=== 1894 ===
–

=== 1895 ===
- Cecil Rhodes (1853–1902)
- Charles Hemphill (1822–1908)
- Gerald Balfour (1853–1945)
- Frederick Roberts, 1st Baron Roberts later 1st Earl Roberts (1832–1914)

=== 1896 ===
- Sir Richard Martin, Bt (1831–1901)
- Thomas Sinclair (1838–1914)
- Arthur Smith-Barry (1843–1925)
- Edward Carson (1854–1935)

=== 1897 ===
- Frederick Hamilton-Temple-Blackwood, 1st Marquess of Dufferin and Ava (1826–1902)
- Horace Plunkett (1854–1932)
- William Pirrie (1847–1924)
- Mervyn Wingfield, 7th Viscount Powerscourt (1836–1904)
- William Drennan Andrews (1832–1924)
- George, Duke of York, later George V (1865–1936)

=== 1898 ===
- Luke Dillon, 4th Baron Clonbrock (1834–1917)

=== 1899 ===
- Edward Henry Cooper (1827–1902)
- Windham Wyndham-Quin, 4th Earl of Dunraven and Mount-Earl (1841–1926)

=== 1900 ===
- Prince Arthur, 1st Duke of Connaught and Strathearn (1850–1942)
- Sir David Harrel (1841–1939)
- George Wyndham (1863–1913)
- Dermot Bourke, 7th Earl of Mayo (1851–1927)

== Edward VII, 1901–1910 ==
=== 1901 ===
–

=== 1902 ===
- Anthony Nugent, 11th Earl of Westmeath (1870–1933)
- Jonathan Hogg (1847–1930)
- John Crichton, 4th Earl Erne (1839–1914)
- William Kenny (1846–1921)
- Sir Daniel Dixon, Bt (1844–1907)
- James Butler, 3rd Marquess of Ormonde (1844–1919)
- Sir John Ross, Bt (1854–1935)
- Henry Robinson (1857–1927)

=== 1903 ===
- Frederick Stringer Wrench (1849–1926)
- Sir Antony MacDonnell (1844–1925)
- Sir John Colomb (1838–1909)
- Thomas Andrews (1843–1916)

=== 1904 ===
- Francis Grenfell (1841–1925)

=== 1905 ===
- Walter Long (1854–1924)
- Uchter Knox, 5th Earl of Ranfurly (1856–1933)
- Sir Frederick Falkiner (1831–1908)
- James Campbell (1851–1931)
- James Bryce (1838–1922)
- Sir Patrick Coll (1839–1917)
- Richard Cherry (1859–1923)
- Sir Rowland Blennerhasset, Bt (1839–1909)

=== 1906 ===
- Sir Francis Workman-Macnaghten, Bt (1828–1911)

=== 1907 ===
- Augustine Birrell (1850–1933)
- Richard Edmund Meredith (1855–1916)
- Alexander Montgomery Carlisle (1854–1926)
- Robert Young (1822–1917)

=== 1908 ===
- Sir Neville Lyttelton (1845–1931)
- Bernard FitzPatrick, 2nd Baron Castletown (1849–1937)
- Thomas Russell (1841–1920)
- Sir James Brown Dougherty (1844–1934)

=== 1909 ===
- Sir William Butler (1838–1910)
- Michael Finucane (1851–1911)
- William Frederick Bailey (1857–1917)
- James Owens Wylie (1845–1935)
- Redmond Barry (1866–1913)

== George V, 1910–1922 ==
=== 1910 ===
- Sir Robert Matheson (1845–1926)

=== 1911 ===
- Thomas Shillington (1835–1925)
- Michael Francis Cox (1852–1926)
- Robert Glendinning (1844–1928)
- Lawrence Ambrose Waldron (1858–1923)
- Charles O'Connor (1854–1928)

=== 1912 ===
- Thomas O'Shaughnessy (1850–1933)
- Sir Arthur Paget (1851–1928)
- Ignatius O'Brien (1857–1930)
- Ivor Guest, 1st Baron Ashby St Ledgers later 1st Viscount Wimborne (1873–1939)

=== 1913 ===
- William Huston Dodd (1844–1930)
- Edward Archdale (1850–1916)
- Thomas Molony (1865–1949)
- John Moriarty (d. 1915)

=== 1914 ===
- W. J. M. Starkie (1860–1920)
- Jonathan Pim (1858–1949)
- Sir Matthew Nathan (1862–1939)

=== 1915 ===
- Stephen Ronan (1848–1925)
- John Gordon (1849–1922)

=== 1916 ===
- Sir Lovick Friend (1856–1944)
- Walter MacMurrough Kavanagh (1856–1922)
- H. H. Asquith (1852–1928)
- Sir John Maxwell (1859–1929)
- Denis Charles Joseph O'Conor, O'Conor Don (1869–1917)
- Sir Robert Chalmers (1858–1938)
- Henry Duke (1855–1939)
- Sir Walter Boyd, Bt (1833–1918)

=== 1917 ===
- Sir Bryan Mahon (1862–1930)
- James O'Connor (1872–1931)
- Arthur Gore, 6th Earl of Arran (1868–1958)
- Sir William Goulding, Bt (1856–1925)

=== 1918 ===
- Ian Macpherson (1880–1937)
- Edward Shortt (1862–1935)
- Sir Frederick Shaw (1861–1942)
- John Beresford, 5th Baron Decies (1866–1944)
- Arthur Samuels (1852–1925)
- Sir Dunbar Barton, Bt (1853–1937)
- Sir William Byrne (1859–1935)
- Charles Vane-Tempest-Stewart, 7th Marquess of Londonderry (1878–1949)
- Bernard Forbes, 8th Earl of Granard (1874–1948)
- Sir Stanley Harrington (1856–1949)
- Sir Thomas Stafford, Bt (1857–1935)
- Frank Brooke (1851–1920)
- John French, 1st Viscount French later 1st Earl of Ypres (1852–1925)

=== 1919 ===
- Robert Sharman-Crawford (1853–1934)
- Denis Henry (1864–1925)
- John Campbell White (d. 1923)
- Sir James Johnston (1849–1924)
- John Bernard (1860–1927)

=== 1920 ===
- Martin Morris, 2nd Baron Killanin (1867–1927)
- James MacMahon (1865–1954)
- Samuel Cunningham (1862–1946)
- Sir Nevil Macready (1862–1946)
- Sir Hamar Greenwood, Bt (1870–1948)
- Sir John Anderson (1882–1958)
- Hugh T. Barrie (1860–1922)
- John Blake Powell (1870–1923)

=== 1921 ===
- Edward Archdale (1853–1943)
- Sir Andrew Beattie (d. 1923)
- Andrew Jameson (1855–1941)
- Sir James Craig, Bt (1871–1940)
- Hugh Pollock (1852–1937)
- Dawson Bates (1876–1949)
- J. M. Andrews (1871–1956)
- Geoffrey Browne, 3rd Baron Oranmore and Browne (1861–1927)
- William Moore (1864–1944)
- G. F. Stewart (1851–1928)
- Frederick Hamilton-Temple-Blackwood, 3rd Marquess of Dufferin and Ava (1875–1930)
- Hugh O'Neill (1883–1982)
- Thomas Watters Brown (1879–1944)
- Robert Wallace (1860–1929)
- Robert Percival-Maxwell (1870–1932)
- Thomas Hamilton (1842–1925)
- William Robert Young (1856–1933)
- Edmund FitzAlan-Howard, 1st Viscount FitzAlan of Derwent (1855–1947)

=== 1922 ===
- Richard Best (1869–1939)
- Henry Givens Burgess (1859–1937)
- Thomas Kennedy Laidlaw (1864–1943)
- Charles Curtis Craig (1869–1960)
- Sir Henry Arthur Wynne (1867–1943)
- William Henry Holmes Lyons (1843–1924)

== Remaining Members after Appointments Ceased ==
Appointed	Name	Birth	Death
1902	William Kenny	1846	1921
1905	Viscount Bryce	1838	1922
1915	John Gordon	1849	1922
1916	Walter MacMurrough Kavanagh	1856	1922
1920	Hugh T. Barrie	1860	1922
1886	Viscount Morley of Blackburn	1838	1923
1887	John George Gibson	1846	1923
1905	Richard Cherry	1859	1923
1911	Lawrence Ambrose Waldron	1858	1923
1920	John Blake Powell	1870	1923
1897	Viscount Pirrie	1847	1924
1897	William Drennan Andrews	1832	1924
1905	Viscount Long	1854	1924
1919	Sir James Johnston	1849	1924
1922	William Henry Holmes Lyons	1843	1924
1896	Lord Barrymore	1843	1925
1903	Lord MacDonnell	1844	1925
1904	Lord Grenfell	1841	1925
1911	Thomas Shillington	1835	1925
1915	Stephen Ronan	1848	1925
1917	Sir William Goulding, Baronet	1856	1925
1918	Arthur Samuels	1852	1925
1918	The Earl of Ypres	1852	1925
1919	Sir Denis Stanislaus Henry, 1st Baronet	1864	1925
1921	Thomas Hamilton	1842	1925
1899	The Earl of Dunraven and Mount-Earl	1841	1926
1903	Frederick Stringer Wrench	1849	1926
1907	Alexander Montgomery Carlisle	1854	1926
1910	Sir Robert Matheson	1845	1926
1911	Michael Francis Cox	1852	1926
1900	The Earl of Mayo	1851	1927
1902	Sir Henry Augustus Robinson, 1st Baronet	1857	1927
1919	The Lord Archbishop of Dublin and Primate of Ireland	1860	1927
1920	Lord Killanin	1867	1927
1921	Lord Oranmore and Browne and Mereworth	1861	1927
1882	Sir George Otto Trevelyan, 2nd Baronet	1838	1928
1889	Dodgson Hamilton Madden	1840	1928
1911	Robert Glendinning	1844	1928
1911	Charles Andrew O'Connor	1854	1928
1912	Sir Arthur Paget	1851	1928
1916	The Earl of Oxford and Asquith	1852	1928
1921	G. F. Stewart	1851	1928
1887	The Earl of Meath	1841	1929
1892	The Earl of Fingall	1859	1929
1916	Sir John Maxwell	1859	1929
1921	Robert Wallace	1860	1929
1887	The 1st Earl of Balfour	1848	1930
1889	Sir West Ridgeway	1844	1930
1902	Jonathan Hogg	1847	1930
1912	Lord Shandon	1857	1930
1913	William Huston Dodd	1844	1930
1917	Sir Bryan Mahon	1862	1930
1921	The Marquess of Dufferin and Ava	1875	1930
1885	Sir William Hart Dyke, 7th Baronet	1837	1931
1905	Lord Glenavy	1851	1931
1908	The Hon. Sir Heville Lyttelton	1845	1931
1917	Sir James O'Connor	1872	1931
1892	Lord Atkinson	1844	1932
1897	Sir Horace Plunkett	1854	1932
1921	Robert Percival-Maxwell	1870	1932
1902	The Earl of Westmeath	1870	1933
1905	The Earl of Ranfurly	1856	1933
1907	Augustine Birrell	1850	1933
1912	Sir Thomas O'Shaughnessy	1850	1933
1921	William Robert Young	1856	1933
1908	Sir James Brown Dougherty	1844	1934
1919	Robert Sharman-Crawford	1853	1934
1896	Lord Carson	1854	1935
1902	Sir John Ross, 1st Baronet	1854	1935
1909	James Owens Wylie	1845	1935
1918	Edward Shortt	1862	1935
1918	Sir William Byrne	1859	1935
1918	Sir Thomas Stafford, Baronet	1857	1935
1897	King George V	1865	1936
1908	Lord Castletown	1849	1937
1918	Lord Strathcarron	1880	1937
1918	Sir Dunbart Barton, Baronet	1853	1937
1921	Hugh MacDowell Pollock	1852	1937
1922	Henry Givens Burgess	1859	1937
1916	Lord Chalmers	1858	1938
1900	Sir David Harrel	1841	1939
1912	Viscount Wimborne	1873	1939
1914	Sir Matthew Nathan	1862	1939
1916	Lord Merrivale	1855	1939
1922	Richard Best	1869	1939
1921	Viscount Craigavon	1871	1940
1921	Andrew Jameson	1855	1941
1900	Prince Arthur, Duke of Connaught and Strathearn	1850	1942
1918	Sir Frederick Shaw	1861	1942
1921	Sir Edward Archdale, 1st Baronet	1853	1943
1922	Thomas Kennedy Laidlaw	1864	1943
1922	Sir Henry Arthur Wynne	1867	1943
1916	Sir Lovick Friend	1856	1944
1918	Lord Decies	1866	1944
1921	Sir William Moore, 1st Baronet	1864	1944
1921	Thomas Watters Brown	1879	1944
1895	The 2nd Earl of Balfour	1853	1945
1920	Samuel Cunningham	1862	1946
1920	Sir Nevil Macready, 1st Baronet	1862	1946
1921	Viscount FitzAlan of Derwent	1855	1947
1918	The Earl of Granard	1874	1948
1920	Viscount Greenwood	1870	1948
1913	Sir Thomas Molony, 1st Baronet	1856	1949
1914	Jonathan Pim	1858	1949
1918	The Marquess of Londonderry	1878	1949
1918	Sir Stanley Harrington	1856	1949
1921	Sir Dawson Bates, 1st Baronet	1876	1949
1920	James MacMahon	1865	1954
1921	J. M. Andrews	1871	1956
1917	The Earl of Arran	1868	1958
1920	Viscount Waverley	1882	1958
1922	Charles Curtis Craig	1869	1960
1921	Lord Rathcavan	1883	1982
