= Alfred Cope =

British civil servant

Sir Alfred Cope
- Born: Alfred William Cope; 14 January 1877; Lambeth, London
- Died: 13 May 1954 (aged 77); Seaford, Sussex
- Other name: 'Mr Clements'
- Occupation: Civil servant
- Title: Under-Secretary for Ireland
- Term: 1920–22
- Political party: National Liberal Party
- Awards: KCB

Sir Alfred William Cope, KCB (14 January 1877 – 13 May 1954) was a senior British civil servant. As assistant Under-Secretary for Ireland in 1920–22, he is notable for serving as an intermediary between the British government and Sinn Féin before and after the establishment of the Irish Free State. He was knighted in 1922 for his role.

== Early life ==
Cope was raised in Waterloo, Lambeth, London, the eldest of eleven children born to Alfred and Margaret Cope, and nicknamed "Andy". By age 14, he was employed as an office clerk.

== Career ==
By 1901, Cope was working for the Inland Revenue.

Following a career as a detective in H.M. Customs and Excise, Cope became Second Secretary at the Ministry of Pensions (1919–20). He was appointed Assistant Under-Secretary in Ireland during the Irish War of Independence in May 1920, as part of a task force appointed by David Lloyd George to clean up the civil administration of Dublin Castle which was in chaos. Cope was enlisted with Sir John Anderson, the finest permanent secretary of his generation, and General Sir Nevil Macready, the best qualified army general.

Cope's forensic and analytical skills were needed to get on top of the intelligence data being secured from informants about IRA activity, which was increasingly violent. Cope was needed to help collect taxes to stem the tide of civil disobedience, lawless parts of Dublin. "Many of them [British security] became just as aggressive as the Tans or Auxies". Cope and the Inspector-General were deployed at the Castle to interrogate suspects.

The British required police to carry arms provoking a policy of violent reprisals. When RIC rep Tim Brennan had the temerity to suggest an unarmed approach with policy of support for Dominion Home Rule, Cope made it plain what London required. Cope seems to have reported to the Prime Minister that General Tudor like to burn and shoot as Official Reprisals. But Cope was a friend to the ordinary rank and file, who blamed the policy outcomes on poor leadership. Yet in late 1920 the British were winning the war. Although Macready banned reprisals in August 1920, the policemen that surrounded Cope still believed they 'do good'. Ever since he had arrived in Dublin Cope sought to urge upon the church reconciliation: the moment De Valera walked into Portobello Barracks, he had in fact been in negotiations with Bishop Fogarty and another prelate to secure peace. At the same time Cope and James MacMahon were responsible for arranging a meeting between De Valera and James Craig. De Valera resisted treaty moves, when Cope was continually meeting Collins and others. Following the Treaty, Cope assisted Sir Nevil Macready in supervising the withdrawal of British forces from Ireland.

Cope was also Clerk of the Privy Council of Ireland 1920–1922. After his role in Ireland, he served as General Secretary of the National Liberal Party, 1923–25.

Cope entered civilian life in 1925, became managing director of Amalgamated Anthracite Collieries, Ltd. 1926–35, and was Chairman of W. Abbott & Sons Ltd.

When the Second World War began in 1939, Cope took a voluntary role in the office of the Lord Privy Seal under Sir John Anderson. He was also elected chairman of the Seaford Urban Council in 1939.

In 1950 he was asked to assist the Irish "Bureau of Military History", with his recollections of his service in 1920-22. He answered in January 1951 that: "... I regard the period (and also that following the Treaty) to be the most discreditable of your country's history - it is preferable to forget it; to let sleeping dogs lie. It is not possible for this history to be truthful although I am sure Mr. McDunphy will do his utmost to make it so - the job is beyond human skill. The I.R.A. must be shown as national heroes and the British Forces as brutal oppressors. Accordingly, the Truce and Treaty Will have been brought about by the defeat of the British by the valour of small and ill-equipped groups of irregulars. And so on. What a travesty it will be and must be. Read by future generations of Irish children, it will simply perpetuate the long standing hatred of England and continue the miserable work of self-seeking politicians who, for their own aggrandisement, have not permitted the Christian virtues of Forgiveness and Brotherhood to take its place. Ireland has too many histories; she deserves a rest."

== Honours ==
Cope was appointed a Companion of the Order of the Bath (CB) in the 1920 Birthday Honours and knighted in the same order (KCB) in the 1922 Dissolution Honours.
