= David Harrell =

David Harrell may refer to:

- David Harrel (born 1950), computer scientist
- David Edwin Harrell (1930–2021), American historian
