= Robert Perceval-Maxwell =

Robert Perceval-Maxwell may refer to:

- Robert Perceval-Maxwell (politician, born 1870) (1870–1932), Northern Irish politician and British Army officer
- Robert Perceval-Maxwell (politician, born 1896) (1896–1963), Northern Irish politician and British Army officer, son of the above
