= Mark Grant-Sturgis =

British civil servant (1884–1949)

Sir Mark Beresford Russell Grant-Sturgis KCB (born Sturgis; 10 July 1884 – 29 April 1949) was a British civil servant who served as Assistant Under-Secretary for Ireland.

Grant-Sturgis was the son of Julian Sturgis and Mary Maude Beresford, daughter of Colonel Marcus Wylly de la Poer Beresford. Mary Beresford was descendant from William Wylly, the Chief Justice of St. Vincent in the early 19th Century, and Matilda Mathews, the daughter of American Loyalist David Mathews, the Loyalist Mayor of New York City during the American Revolutionary War and descendant of the Dutch American Schuyler family.

He was educated at Eton College before becoming assistant private secretary to then chancellor of the exchequer, H. H. Asquith.

From 1920 to 1922, he was assistant to the joint Under-Secretaries for Ireland, James Macmahon and Sir John Anderson. He subsequently became Presiding Special Commissioner of Income Tax. The 1923 New Year Honours saw him appointed Knight Commander of the Order of the Bath.

On 9 July 1914, he married Lady Ellen Rachel Montagu-Stuart-Wortley-Mackenzie, daughter of Francis Montagu-Stuart-Wortley-Mackenzie, 2nd Earl of Wharncliffe. They had two sons, Patrick John Russell (born 1915) and Robin Julian (born 1920), and a daughter, Pamela Rachael (born 1916). She married first, Allan Alexander Cameron, and secondly Hon. Simon Baring, son of Alexander Baring, 4th Baron Ashburton.

In 1935, he assumed the additional name of Grant by royal licence., under the terms of the will of his friend William "Billy" Grant of Hillersdon House, nephew of William Grant (Master of the Rolls).

He died in London in 1949. His funeral was held at Golders Green Crematorium and attended by Prince Tomislav of Yugoslavia, representing his mother, Queen Maria, as well as several prominent government officials and aristocrats, including the Earl and Countess of Wharncliffe; Violet, Countess of Ypres; Lord Adam Gordon, Sir Neville Anderson, Sir Eric St John Bamford, and Sir Roderick Meiklejohn

In 1999 his diaries detailing his time as a senior Civil Servant in Ireland were published by the Irish Academic Press in Dublin. Namely: 'The Last Days of Dublin Castle: The Diaries of Mark Sturgis'. In these diaries he expressed that "I almost begin to believe that these mean, dishonest, insufferably conceited Irishmen are an inferior race and are only sufferable when they are whipped – like the Jews".
