= Hillersdon House =

Manor House in Devon, England

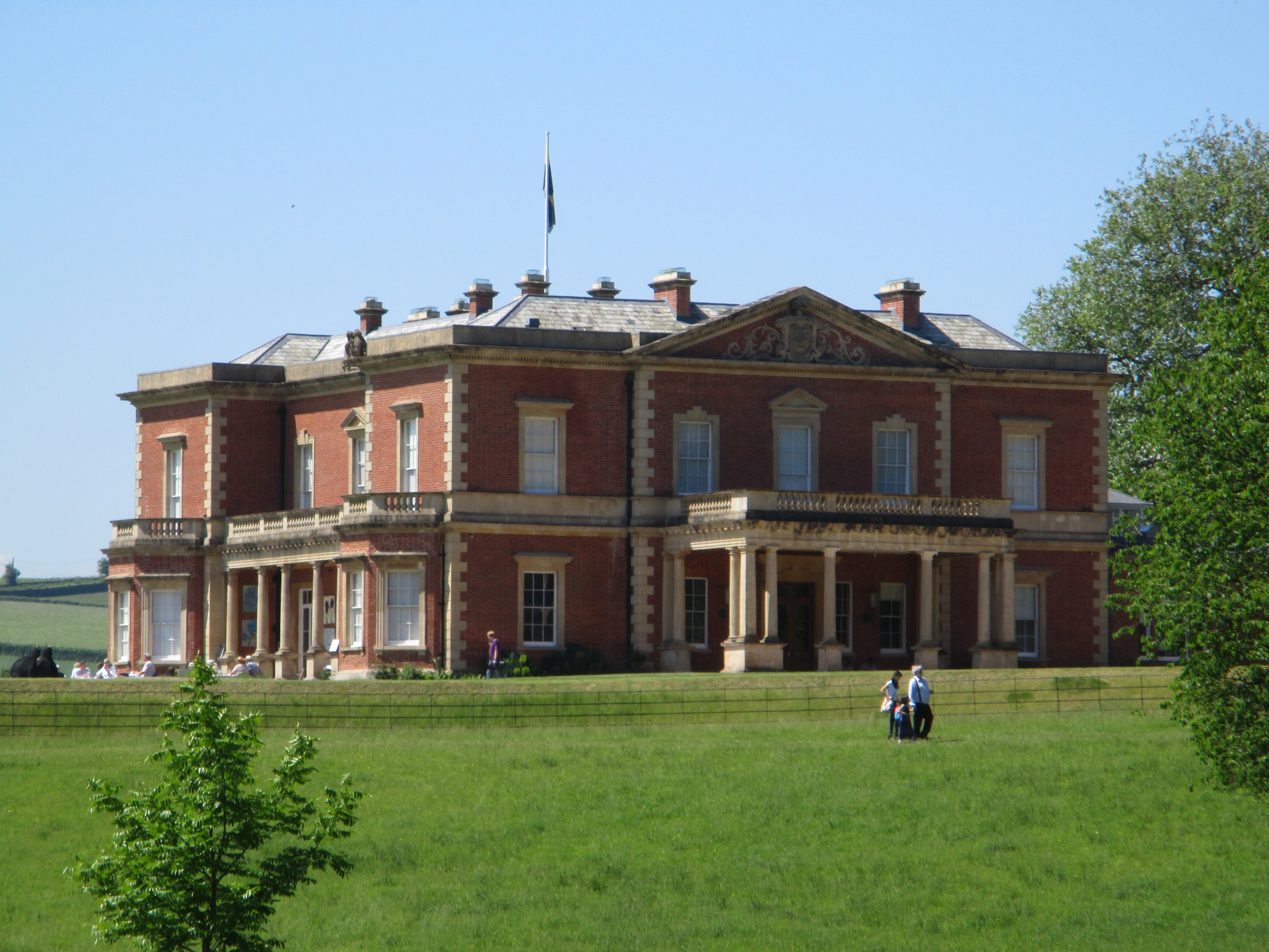
- Hillersdon House

- Location within Devon
- 50°51′45″N 3°25′44″W
- Location: Cullompton, Devon, England

History
- Built: 1848

Site notes
- Architect: Samuel Beazley

Listed Building – Grade II*
- Official name: Hillersdon House
- Designated: 5 April 1966
- Reference no.: 1326145

Listed Building – Grade II
- Official name: Stable block 50 metres north of Hillersdon House
- Designated: 11 June 1986
- Reference no.: 1105931

Listed Building – Grade II
- Official name: Jane's Cottage 150 metres south-south-west of Hillersdon House
- Designated: 11 June 1986
- Reference no.: 1168555

Hillersdon House in the parish of Cullompton in Devon, is a grade II* listed late Georgian style manor house overlooking that town. It was built in 1848 by William Charles Grant (1817–1877), to the design of Samuel Beazley, the notable theatre architect.

== Description ==
The house is a two-storey building arranged around a central hall, built of red brick with Portland stone dressing and a hipped slate roof. The red brick stable block was built at about the same time as the main house along with "Jane's Cottage" within the grounds. The main house is set out on an "H" plan around a central hall. The north-east front is the main entrance with a porte-cochère flanked by Tuscan columns, while the south-west side mirrors the north east but without the porte-cochère. It is surrounded by landscaped gardens with ponds and a deer park.

== History ==
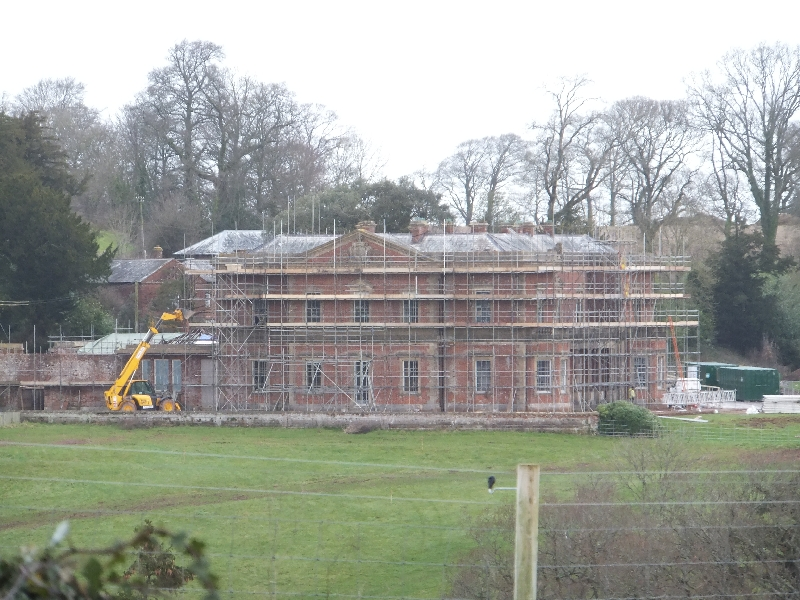
The south-west front of Hillersdon House undergoing restoration in 2012

Hillersdon House was built in 1848 by William Charles Grant, a Lieutenant of the First (Kings) Dragoon Guards and a nephew of Sir William Grant (1752–1832), Member of Parliament, Solicitor General and Master of the Rolls. Grant purchased the estate in about 1847. In 1843 Grant had married Maria May (d.1891), a noted pteridologist. and W.C. Grant built the surviving house to replace the earlier house which was in a dilapidated state, and which had been offered for rent in the early 19th century.

In 1877 W.C. Grant died and Hillersdon passed to his second and eldest surviving son William John Alexander Grant ("Johnny") (1851–1935), a distinguished Arctic photographer who in 1895 married Enid Maud Forster, whom he divorced in 1901. In the 1890s Hillersdon became known for its wild parties. One incident occurred after the Exeter Ball, when four young gentlemen plunged into one of the lakes and were subsequently washed off in baths of champagne. Elinor Glyn, a noted society beauty was part of the house party on this occasion.

After the death of William Grant in 1935 the house was inherited under his will by Sir Mark Beresford Russell Sturgis (1884–1949), KCB, Assistant Under-Secretary for Ireland, who took the additional surname of Grant, as a condition of the will. In the Second World War it housed US Officers and then became a bed and breakfast and later was divided into five flats. It was purchased in 1982 by David and Gale Glynn, who having undertaken some refurbishment work sold it in 2010 for an asking price of £3-£4 million.

In 2010, Hillersdon was purchased by Michael Lloyd and has since undergone a complete refurbishment and is now used as a wedding venue and hotel.

== Sources ==
- Colvin and Moggridge (2011). Hillersdon House, Appendix 4, Archival Review of Landscape History. Archived from the original on 2 April 2017.
