= Thomas Waite =

Thomas Waite may refer to:

- Thomas Waite (regicide) (died 1688), English Member of Parliament and one of the regicides of King Charles I
- Thomas Waite (civil servant) (1718–1780), Irish civil servant
- Tommy Waite (born 1972), Northern Irish boxer
- Dr Thomas Waite, British epidemiologist and UK Government health advisor
