= Robert Chalmers, 1st Baron Chalmers =

British civil servant

The Right Honourable The Lord Chalmers GCB PC (Ire)
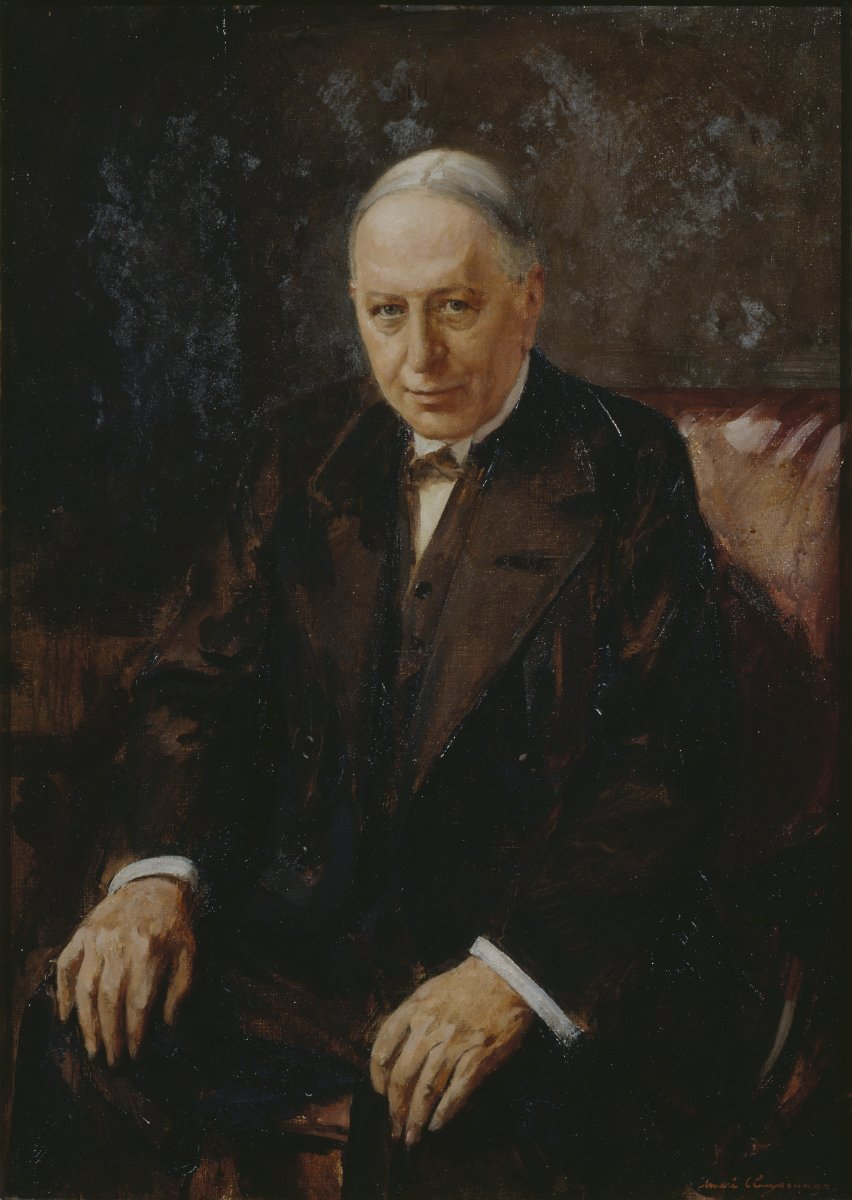
- by André Cluysenaar (1872-1939), 1920. Oil on canvas, 68.5x49 cm. Government Art Collection(GAC).

21st Governor of Ceylon
- In office 18 October 1913 – 4 December 1915
- Monarch: George V
- Preceded by: Reginald Edward Stubbs (Acting governor)
- Succeeded by: Reginald Edward Stubbs (Acting governor)

Permanent Secretary to the Treasury
- In office 1911–1913
- Preceded by: T. L. Heath
- Succeeded by: Warren Fisher

Personal details
- Born: 18 August 1858 Stoke Newington, Middlesex
- Died: 17 November 1938 (aged 80)
- Spouse(s): Maud Piggott; Iris Florence
- Children: 3, including Ralph

Robert Chalmers, 1st Baron Chalmers, GCB, PC (Ire) (18 August 1858 – 17 November 1938) was a British civil servant, and a Pali and Buddhist scholar. In later life, he served as the Master of Peterhouse, Cambridge.

== Background and education ==
Chalmers was born in Stoke Newington, Middlesex, the son of John Chalmers and his wife Julia (née Mackay). He was educated at the City of London School and Oriel College, Oxford with a BA in 1881. He eventually went on to become the Master of Peterhouse, Cambridge.

== Career ==
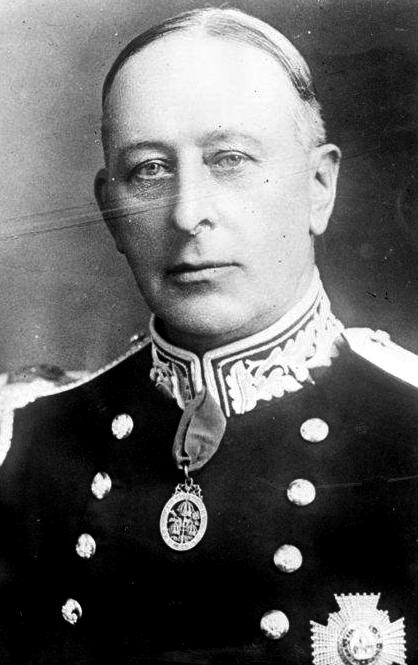
Robert Chalmers, 1st Baron Chalmers. Civil Servant and Pali scholar, in 1919.

=== Civil Servant and Governor of Ceylon ===
He joined the Treasury in 1882 and served as Assistant Secretary to the Treasury from 1903 to 1907. He was then Chairman of the Board of Inland Revenue between 1907 and 1911, and Permanent Secretary to the Treasury from to 1911 to 1913. In June 1913 Chalmers was appointed Governor of Ceylon, a post he held from 18 October 1913 to 4 December 1915.

Chalmers is frequently accused of having been anti-Buddhist. These accusations are unfounded, for before being appointed Governor of Ceylon in 1913, he was a prominent member of the Pali Text Society. As such, he had already translated many Buddhist texts into English from Pali, a language he had mastered. Also, when he arrived in Ceylon, his fame as a scholar was greatly appreciated by dignitaries of Buddhism. One of the first official ceremonies he presided over was the presentation of the Vidyodaya Pirivena Awards, named after a famous Buddhist university in Colombo. He delivered his speech not in English, but in Pali, thus arousing the admiration of the scholars present.

In 1915, a series of riots broke out in British Ceylon between Buddhists and Muslims. In response to the riots, Chalmers declared martial law in Ceylon, and deployed the Ceylon Defence Force, the Ceylon Police Force and the 28th Punjabis alongside Brigadier-General Henry Huntly Leith Malcolm and police chief Herbert Dowbiggin to quell the rioting. Hastily formed units of European auxiliaries modelled after the Colombo Town Guard were formed to assist these efforts. The soldiers, policemen and auxiliaries were authorised by Chalmers, Malcolm and Dowbiggin to summarily execute anyone they deemed to be a rioter. After the riots, Ceylonese barrister E. W. Perera travelled to the United Kingdom to inform the British government of what had occurred in Ceylon. As a result, Chalmers was recalled to England and a Royal Commission of Inquiry was appointed to investigate the riots.

After serving as governor of Ceylon, he was then briefly Under-Secretary to Lord Lieutenant Lord Wimborne in 1916. He was admitted to the Privy Council of Ireland in the same year. Chalmbers then returned to the Treasury and served as Joint Permanent Secretary to the Treasury from 1916 to 1919. In 1919 he was raised to the peerage as Baron Chalmers, of Northiam in the County of Sussex.

=== Pali and Buddhist scholar ===
From the beginning of his schooling at the City of London School from 1870 to 1877, he was very interested in ancient languages, especially Greek, Latin. He was also interested in Sanskrit and philology. He completed his studies at Oriel College, Oxford, where he obtained the Bachelor of Arts (BA) in 1881.

In 1882, when he began his career as a civil servant in Her Majesty's Treasury, he continued to pursue classical studies in the hopes of perfecting his knowledge of ancient languages.

He attended the Pāli classes of Thomas William Rhys Davids, whose enthusiasm won him over, and became a member of the Pali Text Society. From 1891 he published numerous articles in the Journal of the Royal Asiatic Society, including English translations of Pāli texts primarily from the Majjhima Nikaya.

In 1897, he made a presentation dealing with the Pāli term Tathagata, at the Eleventh International Congress of Orientalists held in Paris.

Between 1895 and 1902, under the direction of T.W Rhys Davids, he published the first English translation of the Sutta Pitaka, from the original texts written in Sinhala, Siamese and Burmese. This first version was later revised, expanded and published by the Pali Text Society in 1926-1927 under the title Further Discourses of the Buddha.

From 1922 to 1925 he was president of the Royal Asiatic Society.

In 1924, he was appointed professor at Peterhouse College of the University of Cambridge and taught there until 1931.

At the same time, he produced his ultimate work of scholarship: a translation of the Sutta Nipāta, published in 1932, then considered remarkable for its style and literary accuracy.

Assessment of his dual career

In almost forty years, he translated more than 2,000 Buddhist texts. His erudition has made him a well-known and respected scholar. Unfortunately, his competence in this field was of no use to him in his other career, particularly in managing the riots of 1915, which ironically took place in one of the countries where the ancient texts he studied tirelessly for most of his life were written.

== Family ==
Lord Chalmers married, firstly, Maud Mary Piggott, daughter of John George Forde Piggott, in 1888. After her death in 1923 he married, secondly, Iris Florence, daughter of Sir John Biles and widow of Robert Latta, in 1935. His two sons from his first marriage, Captain Ralph Chalmers and Lieutenant Robert Chalmers, were both killed in the First World War (within the same month). His daughter Mabel lived until the 1960s. Lord Chalmers died in November 1938, aged 80. As he had no surviving male issue the barony died with him. Lady Chalmers died in 1966.

== Death ==
His health began to deteriorate in the summer of 1938. He died on 18 November of the same year, leaving no male heirs. As a result, he is both the 1st and the last Baron Chalmers. He was buried in East Sheen Cemetery, London.

== Selected works ==
R. Chalmers has translated over 2,000 Pali texts. It would be difficult to compile a complete list. Here are some of them, including two writings not related to Buddhism.

=== Articles ===
- "The Parables of Barlaam and Joasaph". Journal of the Royal Asiatic Society: 423–449. 1891.
- "The Lineage of The Proud King". Journal of the Royal Asiatic Society. 1892.
- "Majjhima Nikāya 84. The Madhura Sutta concerning Caste". Journal of the Royal Asiatic Society: 341–366. 1894..
- "Letter from Robert Chalmers". Journal of the Royal Asiatic Society: 386–387. 1894..
- "Majjhima Nikaya 123. "Acchariyabbhuta-suttam",The Nativity of the Buddha". Journal of the Royal Asiatic Society: 751–771. 1895..
- "The Jains". Journal of the Royal Asiatic Society. 1895.
- "The Tathāgata". Journal of the Royal Asiatic Society: 103–115. 1898.. (Note: this is the text referred to above, presented at the International Congress of Orientalists held in Paris in November 1897, published in January 1898).
- "The King of Siam's Edition of the Pāli Tipiṭaka". Journal of the Royal Asiatic Society: 1–10. 1898..

=== Books ===
- Further dialogues of the Buddha, texts of the Majjhima-nikâya, London, H.S. Milford, Oxford University Press, Collection : Sacred books of the Buddhists n°5 and 6, 1926–1927. Reprinted by Sri Satguru Publications, Delhi, 2 volumes, Collection Bibliotheca Indo-Buddhica n°44-45, 1988.
- Buddha's Teachings being the Sutta-nipāta or Discourse-Collection, Delhi, India, Motilal Barnasidass Publishers, 1932 (reprint in 1997), 300 p., ISBN 8120813553, 9788120813557.
- The Jātaka or Stories of the Buddha's Former Births, co-authors: Edward Byles Cowell, H.T Francis, Robert Alexander Neil and W.H.D. Rouse, Bristol, Pali Text Society, original edition in 6 volumes, 1895–1907, reprint in 3 volumes in 1990 ISBN 0 86013 260 9.

=== Writings not related to Buddhism ===
- A history of currency in the British colonies, London, 1893 . Printed for Her Majesty's Stationery Office by Eyre & Spottiswoode, London, 1893.
- Thomas William Rhys Davids 1843-1922, London, From the proceedings of the British Academy. Published by H.S. Milford, Oxford University Press, 1923.

== Honours ==
Chalmers was appointed a Companion (civil division) of the Order of the Bath (CB) in the 1900 New Year Honours list on 1 January 1900 (the order was gazetted on 16 January 1900), and he was invested by Queen Victoria at Windsor Castle on 1 March 1900. He was promoted to Knight Commander (KCB) of the order in the 1908 Birthday Honours, and to Knight Grand Cross (GCB) in the 1916 New Year Honours. He was admitted to the Irish Privy Council in 1916.

== Bibliography ==
- Heath, Thomas Little; Matheson, P. E. (1941). "Lord Chalmers, 1858-1938 [compiled by Sir Thomas Heath and P.E. Matheson]". Proceedings of the British Academy. Vol. XXV. London: Sir Humphrey Milford. OCLC 1048802695.
- Hesilrige, Arthur G. M. (1921). Debrett's Peerage and Titles of courtesy. London: Dean & Son. p. 189.

Government offices
Preceded by Sir Henry Primrose	Chairman, Board of Inland Revenue; 1907–1911	Succeeded by Sir Matthew Nathan
Preceded by Reginald Edward Stubbs acting governor	Governor of Ceylon; 1913–1915	Succeeded by Reginald Edward Stubbs acting governor
Academic offices
Preceded by Adolphus Ward	Master of Peterhouse, Cambridge; 1924–1931	Succeeded by William Birdwood
Peerage of the United Kingdom
New creation	Baron Chalmers; 1919–1938	Extinct
