= Robert Wallace (British Army officer) =

Irish army officer and barrister (1860–1929)

Colonel The Right Honourable Robert Wallace CB CBE
- Born: Robert Hugh Wallace; 14 December 1860; Downpatrick, County Down, Ireland
- Died: 23 December 1929 (aged 69)
- Occupations: Barrister, solicitor, British Army officer

Colonel Robert Hugh Wallace CB CBE PC (Ire) (14 December 1860 – 23 December 1929) was a British soldier and a lawyer and politician in Northern Ireland.

Wallace was born in Downpatrick, County Down. He was educated at Harrow School and Brasenose College, Oxford. He was called to the bar by the Inner Temple in 1886 and admitted a solicitor of the High Court of Justice of Ireland in 1890. He was Grand Master of the Belfast Orangemen for twenty years and a prominent Freemason and member of the Ulster Unionist Council.

In November 1879, he was commissioned into the Royal South Down Militia (later the 5th Battalion, Royal Irish Rifles). He was promoted lieutenant in August 1880, captain in December 1882, major in December 1892, and lieutenant-colonel in January 1898. He commanded the battalion in the Second Boer War, and was promoted honorary colonel in February 1900. The war ended with the Peace of Vereeniging in late May 1902, and the following month Wallace returned home with most of his battalion in the SS Avondale Castle, arriving at Southampton in late July. For his war service, he was mentioned in despatches, and appointed Companion of the Order of the Bath (CB) in the South Africa honours list of 26 June 1902, receiving the actual decoration from King Edward VII after his return, during an investiture at Buckingham Palace on 24 October 1902.

He resigned his commission in January 1913, but returned to command the 19th (Reserve) Battalion of the regiment from 1915 to 1917, when he became camp commandant of Donard Lodge Camp, Newcastle, County Down.

He was appointed Commander of the Order of the British Empire (CBE) in 1920 and was appointed to the Privy Council of Ireland in the honours for the opening of the Parliament of Northern Ireland in July 1921, entitling him to the style "The Right Honourable".
