= Under-Secretary for Ireland =

Head of the pre-1922 Dublin Castle administration in Ireland

The Under-Secretary for Ireland (Permanent Under-Secretary to the Lord Lieutenant of Ireland) was the permanent head (or most senior civil servant) of the British administration in Ireland prior to the establishment of the Irish Free State in 1922.

The Under-Secretary's residence was at Ashtown Lodge in Phoenix Park, also known as the Under Secretary's Lodge.

Among the best-known holders of the office was Thomas Henry Burke, who was assassinated along with the Chief Secretary for Ireland, Lord Frederick Cavendish, in the so-called Phoenix Park Killings on Saturday, 6 May 1882.

In April 1887 Colonel Edward Robert King-Harman was appointed Parliamentary Under-Secretary to the Lord Lieutenant, but he died on 10 June 1888 and no further appointments were made.

== Under-Secretaries for Ireland ==
Under-Secretary to the Chief Secretary

- Arthur Podmore by 1690
- Joshua Dawson 1699
- Eustace Budgell 1714
- Charles Maddockes 1718
- Thomas Tickell 1724
- 1740 John Potter
- Thomas Waite 1747

Under-Secretary (Civil Department)

- Thomas Waite 1777
- Sackville Hamilton 1780–1795
- Lodge Morres 1795
- Sackville Hamilton 1795–1796
- Edward Cooke 1796-1800

Under-Secretary (Military Department)

- Henry Meredyth 1777
- John William Hamilton 1778
- John Lees 1781
- Charles Francis Sheridan 1782
- Edward Cooke 1789
- John Doyle 9 February 1795
- Edward Cooke 1 June 1795
- William Elliot 1796

Under-Secretary

- Alexander Marsden 1801–1806
- James Traill 1806–1808
- Sir Charles Saxton 1808–1812
- William Gregory 1812–1831
- Sir William Gossett 1831–1835
- Thomas Drummond 1835–1840
- Norman Hilton Macdonald 1840–1841
- Edward Lucas 1841–1845
- Richard Pennefather 1845–1846
- Sir Thomas Nicholas Redington 1846–1852
- John Arthur Wynne 1852–1853
- Sir Thomas Aiskew Larcom 1853–1868
- Sir Edward Robert Wetherall 1868–1869
- Thomas Henry Burke 1869–1882
- Sir Robert George Crookshank Hamilton 1882–1886
- Sir Redvers Henry Buller 1886–1887
- Sir Joseph West Ridgeway 1887–1893
- Sir David Harrel 1893–1902
- Sir Antony MacDonnell 1902–1908
- Sir James Brown Dougherty 1908–1914
- Sir Matthew Nathan 1914–1916
- Sir Robert Chalmers 1916
- Sir William Byrne 1916–1918
- James Macmahon 1918–1922 (jointly with Sir John Anderson from 1920)
- Sir John Anderson 1920–1922 (jointly with James Macmahon)

== Assistant Under-Secretaries for Ireland ==
From 1852 to 1876 the Assistant Under-Secretary was called Chief Clerk. After the retirement of Marmion Savage as Clerk of the Privy Council of Ireland in 1853, the Chief Clerk/Assistant Under-Secretary was ex-officio Clerk of the Privy Council of Ireland.

Name	Dates of service	Notes
Robert M. Matheson	1856–1875	His son Sir Robert E. Matheson was Registrar-General for Ireland 1900–1909; his grandson Robert N. Matheson founded the law firm Matheson.
Henry Robinson (1823–1893)	1876–1879	Promoted to vice president of the Local Government Board for Ireland. Father of Sir Henry Robinson, 1st Baronet.
William Kaye (1831–1901)	1878–1895	Afterwards private secretary to the Lord Lieutenant
James Brown Dougherty (1844–1934)	1895–1908	Knighted in 1902
Edward O'Farrell (d.1926)	September 1908–June 1918	Resigned to become one of the three Estates Commissioners in the Irish Land Commission
John James Taylor (1859–1945)	June 1918–1920	When Taylor resigned, John Anderson on 28 May 1920 became "joint under-secretary" with James Macmahon. This marked an escalation of the Black and Tans in the Anglo-Irish War.
Alfred Cope (1877–1954)	28 May 1920–October 1922	Seconded from Whitehall due to the security crisis.: Ernest Clarke was made "additional assistant under-secretary" on 15 September 1921 during the establishment of Northern Ireland. He resigned in late 1921 to become permanent secretary of the NI ministry of finance; Mark Sturgis was given the title "additional assistant under-secretary" on 3 December 1921. He came to Ireland at the same time as Cope and was not given any title at first: Anderson worried "assistant under-secretary" would offend Cope, and Warren Fisher thought "private secretary to the Lord Lieutenant" was too lowly.

== Sources ==
- Chris Cook and Brendan Keith, British Historical Facts 1830–1900 (Macmillan, 1975) p. 149.
- McColgan, John (1983). British policy and the Irish administration, 1920–22. London; Boston: Allen & Unwin. ISBN 978-0-04-941011-4.
- McDowell, R. B. (1976). The Irish administration, 1801–1914. Westport, Conn: Greenwood Press. ISBN 978-0-8371-8561-3.
- Sainty, J. C. (1977). "The Secretariat of the Chief Governors of Ireland, 1690-1800". Proceedings of the Royal Irish Academy. Section C: Archaeology, Celtic Studies, History, Linguistics, Literature. 77: 1–33. ISSN 0035-8991. JSTOR 25506334.
