= Stanley Harrington =

Irish industrialist (1856–1949)

Sir Stanley Harrington, PC (15 May 1856 – 31 July 1949) was an Irish industrialist who played a prominent part in the economic development of Cork. Harrington held interests in banking and shipping in the southwest of Ireland.
