= Ralph Chalmers =

British fencer (1891–1915)

Personal information
- Born: 13 January 1891 Primrose Hill, London, England
- Died: 8 May 1915 (aged 24) Ypres, Belgium

Sport
- Sport: Fencing

Ralph Chalmers (13 January 1891 – 8 May 1915) was a British fencer. He competed in the individual épée event at the 1908 Summer Olympics. He died at the Second Battle of Ypres during World War I while serving as an officer with the Suffolk Regiment.

He was one of the sons of Robert Chalmers, 1st Baron Chalmers, a British civil servant, and a Pali and Buddhist scholar.

== See also ==
- List of Olympians killed in World War I
