= Thomas Stanley of Grangegorman =

17th century politician

Sir Thomas Stanley (1626 – 27 August 1674) was an English politician who sat in the Parliament of Ireland MP for County Tipperary and Waterford and County Louth in the Restoration Parliament, 1661–62. He joined the Privy Council of Ireland in March 1674.

He acquired the manor of Grangegorman, Dublin. Stanley was knighted by Henry Cromwell on 24 January 1659 at Dublin Castle.

Along with another parliamentarian Sir Anthony Morgan, Sir Thomas was implicated in the notorious Blood plot of 1663, in which Thomas Blood had planned to kidnap the Duke of Ormond, the Lord Lieutenant of Ireland, from Dublin Castle. Sir Thomas and Sir Anthony wrote "obsequious letters" to Ormond proclaiming their innocence and devotion to him.

Stanely married Jane Borrowes. They had several children including Thomas Stanley's son and heir Sir John Stanley, 1st Baronet. He was buried at St. Michans, Dublin, 2 September 1674.
