= William Gregory (civil servant) =

Irish politician and senior civil servant

William Gregory PC (I) (February 1762 – 13 April 1840) was an Irish politician and civil servant. He was the most senior permanent official in the Dublin Castle administration between 1812 and 1830, during which time he opposed Catholic emancipation and the liberal agendas of several Lords Lieutenant of Ireland.

== Biography ==
Gregory was the youngest of three sons of Robert Gregory and Marie Auchmuty. Gregory was born in India, where his father worked for the East India Company, but he was educated at Harrow School in England. He then studied at Trinity College, Cambridge, graduating with a Master of Arts in 1787. Gregory entered the Inner Temple in 1788 and was called to the English bar in 1788, although he does not appear to have practised law.

After a period managing his father's estates at Coole Park in County Galway, in 1795 Gregory entered public service as surveyor of Skerries in the Irish administration of Lord Fitzwilliam. In 1799 he was appointed High Sheriff of County Galway. He served briefly in the final Irish parliament as the Member of Parliament for Portarlington between January and August 1800, where he was firm supporter of the Acts of Union 1800. In 1800 he was also appointed secretary to the board of inland navigation. Gregory succeeded to his father's extensive estates and property in 1810 and continued with minor roles in the Irish administration until 1812.

=== Under-Secretary for Ireland ===
On 5 October 1812, Gregory was made Under-Secretary for Ireland by the Duke of Richmond and thereby became the most senior permanent official in Ireland. The new Chief Secretary for Ireland, Sir Robert Peel, soon became accustomed to delegating important decisions to Gregory, who was recognised for both his ability and immaculate manners. As Under-Secretary, Gregory handled much of the business of government. By 1819, he had become known for his ultra-Tory policies, including a ruthless approach to maintaining law and order and virulent anti-Catholicism. Under the early years of Lord Liverpool's premiership, Gregory's influence at Dublin Castle was supreme. He formed a close friendship with Peel, which continued after Peel became Home Secretary in England in 1822, and Gregory assisted Peel's plans for police reform.

Gregory was an uncompromising opponent of Catholic emancipation, which he regarded as a concession which would lead to the disintegration of the British Empire. In 1821, Gregory's strident views caused so much friction with the new lord lieutenant, Lord Wellesley, that Wellesley asked Gregory to resign. Gregory refused and continued as Under-Secretary. When George Canning, who supported emancipation, became Prime Minister in 1827, Gregory offered to resign, but Canning died before a replacement could be found. The following year, another lord lieutenant, Lord Anglesey, also attempted to have Gregory removed from his role, but Gregory remained as Under-Secretary, despite being offered a baronetcy if he left. Gregory fell out with Peel when he allowed the passage of the Roman Catholic Relief Act 1829 and Gregory was finally dismissed from office on 27 December 1830. Daniel O'Connell had called for Gregory's removal since 1828, describing him as "the real ruler of Ireland".

=== Personal life ===
On 1 October 1789, Gregory married Anne Trench, the daughter of William Trench, 1st Earl of Clancarty. They had two sons and one daughter. The elder son, Robert, was the father of Sir William Henry Gregory.

After his dismissal from the Castle in 1830, Gregory retired from public life. In 1835 he was appointed to the Privy Council of Ireland, having twice rejected an hereditary title. He died on 13 April 1840 at his Phoenix Park residence, which he had occupied since 1812 as the Ranger of the Park.

Government offices
Preceded by Sir Charles Saxton, Bt	Under-Secretary for Ireland; 1812–1830	Succeeded by Sir William Gosset
Parliament of Ireland
Preceded by Frederick Trench; Thomas Stannus	Member of Parliament for Portarlington; 1800; With: Frederick Trench	Parliament of the United Kingdom
