= William Drennan Andrews =

Judge of the High Court of Justice in Ireland

- Born: 24 January 1832; Comber, County Down, Ireland
- Died: 3 December 1924 (aged 92)
- Education: Trinity College Dublin
- Occupation: Judge

William Drennan Andrews PC (1832–1924) was an Irish judge who served for many years as the Probate Judge. He was the uncle of Sir James Andrews, 1st Baronet, the Lord Chief Justice of Northern Ireland, (whose career he did much to foster), J. M. Andrews, Prime Minister of Northern Ireland and Thomas Andrews, architect of the Titanic. There is a sympathetic sketch of his character in The Old Munster Circuit by Maurice Healy. He was a grandson of William Drennan, the United Irishman leader, and his wife Sarah Swanwick.

== Biography ==
He was born in Comber, County Down, second son of John Andrews, a wealthy flax spinner, and Sarah, daughter of William and Sarah Drennan; his elder brother Thomas, the father of three eminent sons, inherited the family business. William was educated at Trinity College Dublin and the Middle Temple. He was called to the Irish Bar in 1855, Queen's Counsel in 1872. He married Elizabeth Galloway, daughter of John Galloway of Monkstown, Dublin in 1857; she died in 1901. They had no children.

He practised mainly on the North-Eastern Circuit, where his skill in persuading juries of the merits of his client's case became renowned. Maurice Healy quotes the remark: "Once Andrews has stated his client's case to the jury, the only uncertain thing is how great the award of damages will be".

He was appointed to the High Court of Justice in Ireland in 1882, first to the Exchequer Division, and on its abolition in 1897 to the King's Bench Division. He was the Probate Judge for many years, and Healy praises his efficiency in dealing with probate cases – "dealing out the orders like a pack of cards". In criminal cases he was known for his scrupulous fairness in summing up, but also for his exceptionally severe sentences: it was said that where another judge would think three years imprisonment a sufficient punishment, Andrews would often impose a sentence of ten years. He was made a member of the Privy Council of Ireland in 1897. He retired in 1909 and died in 1924.

== Character ==
Maurice Healy's portrayal of Andrews in The Old Munster Circuit is valuable but largely second-hand, since he apparently only met him once. He describes Andrews as a quiet, precise, modest and courteous man, diligent, upright, and with a great fund of legal knowledge. Despite the severity of the sentences he handed down in criminal cases, he was esteemed by all who knew him. V.T.H Delaney in his biography of Christopher Palles gives a similar view of Andrews's character. Serjeant Sullivan ranked Andrews as a judge as one of the four greatest he had known, whether in Ireland or England, together with Christopher Palles, Sir Andrew Porter and Gerald FitzGibbon "men whose superiors I have yet to meet".

== Arms ==
Coat of arms of William Drennan Andrews
Notes Granted 2 March 1910 by Nevile Wilkinson, Ulster King of Arms. Crest A dove holding in the bill an olive branch Proper charged on the breast with a mullet Azure. Torse Of the colours. Escutcheon Azure on a fess Or three mullets of the field. Motto Always Faithful
