= David Harrel =

Irish police officer and civil servant

The Right Honourable Sir David Harrel GCB GBE KCVO ISO

Permanent Under-Secretary to the Lord Lieutenant of Ireland
- In office 1893–1902
- Preceded by: Sir Joseph West Ridgeway
- Succeeded by: Sir Antony MacDonnell

Chief Commissioner of the Dublin Metropolitan Police
- In office 1883–1893

Personal details
- Born: 25 March 1841 Bangor, County Down, Northern Ireland, United Kingdom
- Died: 12 May 1939 (aged 98) Lansdown Crescent, Bath, Somerset, England, United Kingdom
- Occupation: Police officer

Sir David Harrel (25 March 1841 – 12 May 1939) was an Irish police officer and civil servant.

Harrel was born in Mount Pleasant, County Down, the son of a land agent. He was educated at the Royal Naval School, Gosport, but was too old to join the Royal Navy as a Midshipman when he took the exam and instead joined the Merchant Navy. In 1859, he left to join the Royal Irish Constabulary. In 1879 he became a resident magistrate in County Mayo and in 1883 was appointed Chief Commissioner of the Dublin Metropolitan Police. Although himself a Protestant, he had good relations with the Roman Catholic Church and was a member of several bodies which worked to relieve the poverty of the Irish peasantry.

In 1893, Harrel was appointed Under-Secretary for Ireland, a post he held until 1902, when he retired due to ill-health. He continued to sit on many tribunals and voluntary bodies.

Harrel was appointed Knight Commander of the Order of the Bath (KCB) in 1895, Knight Commander of the Royal Victorian Order (KCVO) in 1900, and Knight Grand Cross of the Order of the British Empire (GBE). He was appointed to the Privy Council of Ireland, entitling him to the style "The Right Honourable". In the 1920 New Year Honours, he was appointed Knight Grand Cross of the Order of the Bath (GCB), having served as chairman of the Interim Court of Arbitration on industrial questions from 1918 to 1919.

Harrel's son, William Vesey Harrel, served as Assistant Commissioner of the Dublin Metropolitan Police from 1902 to 1914.

== Arms ==
Coat of arms of David Harrel
Notes Confirmed by Nevile Wilkinson, Ulster King of Arms, 19 January 1909. Crest A bursting grenade Proper. Escutcheon Or a lion rampant Gules grasping with the sinister forepaw a tilting spear erect Argent. Motto Fuimus

== Footnotes ==
Police appointments
Preceded by George Talbot	Chief Commissioner of the Dublin Metropolitan Police; 1883–1893	Succeeded by John Casimir Jones
Government offices
Preceded by Sir Joseph West Ridgeway	Permanent Under-Secretary to the Lord Lieutenant of Ireland; 1893–1902	Succeeded by Sir Antony MacDonnell
