= Sir John Stanley, 1st Baronet =

Irish politician

Sir John Stanley, 1st Baronet Bt

Chief Secretary for Ireland
- In office 1713–1714
- Preceded by: Edward Southwell Sr.
- Succeeded by: Joseph Addison

Personal details
- Born: 1663 Tickencor, County Waterford, Ireland
- Died: 30 November 1744 (aged 80–81)
- Spouse: Ann Granville
- Education: Trinity College Dublin
- Occupation: Politician, Official
- Awards: Fellow of the Royal Society (1688)

Sir John Stanley, 1st Baronet (1663 – 30 November 1744) of Grangegorman, Co. Dublin was an Irish politician.

== Biography ==
Stanley was born in Tickencor, County Waterford, the son of Sir Thomas Stanley of Grangegorman, Dublin and his wife, Jane Borrowes and educated at Trinity College, Dublin.

Stanley was Secretary to various Lords Chamberlains of the Household (1689–1699), Commissioner of Stamp Duties (1698-1700), the Chief Secretary for Ireland 1713–1714, Teller of the Receipt of the Exchequer and MP for Gorey 1713. He was elected a Fellow of the Royal Society in 1688. From 1700 until 1708 he served as Warden of the Mint under Isaac Newton.

Stanley was made a baronet, of Grange Gorman in the Baronetage of England, in 1699. The baronetcy became extinct on his death on 30 November 1744.

== Marriage ==
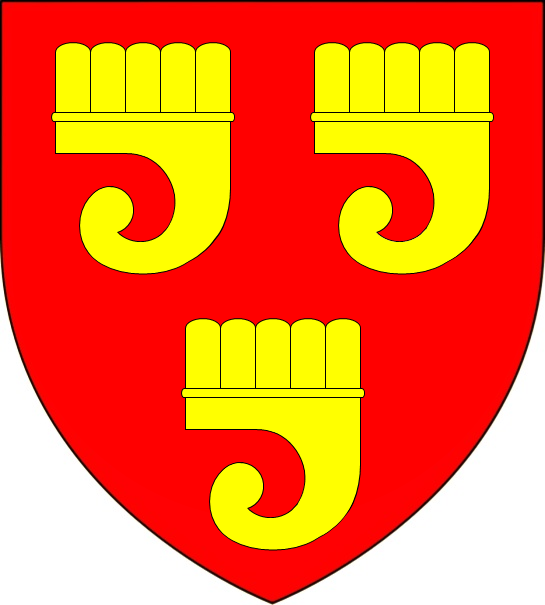
Arms of Granville: Gules, three clarions or

He married Ann Granville (d.1730), a daughter of Bernard Granville (1631-1701) of Birdcage Walk, Westminster, and Apps Court, Walton-on-Thames, Surrey, a courtier, Gentleman of the Horse and Groom of the Bedchamber to King Charles II, and a Member of Parliament for several Cornish constituencies, and younger brother of John Granville, 1st Earl of Bath, who played an important role in effecting the Restoration of the Monarchy. They had no children. Mary Delany was the niece of Ann Granville and lived with them at Whitehall from the ages of 8 to 15.

== Notes ==
Political offices
Preceded by Edward Southwell Sr.	Chief Secretary for Ireland; 1713–1714	Succeeded by Joseph Addison
Baronetage of England
New creation	Baronet (of Grange Gorman); 1699–1744	Extinct
