= Robert Perceval-Maxwell (politician, born 1870) =

British soldier and politician

Colonel The Right Honourable Robert Perceval-Maxwell DSO JP DL

Member, Senate of Northern Ireland
- In office 1921–1925

Personal details
- Born: Robert David Perceval-Maxwell; 1870
- Died: 24 May 1932 (aged 61–62) Belfast, Northern Ireland

Colonel Robert David Perceval-Maxwell DSO JP DL PC (Ire) (1870 – 24 May 1932) was a British soldier and Ulster Unionist Party politician. He was a member of the Senate of Northern Ireland and Down County Council.

Perceval-Maxwell was the only son of John Perceval-Maxwell, eldest son of Robert Perceval-Maxwell DL (1813–1905), of Finnebrogue House, Downpatrick.

Perceval-Maxwell was educated at Eton College. He played a significant part in the raising of the 36th (Ulster) Division on the outbreak of the First World War. He was commissioned Major in the 13th (County Down) Battalion, Royal Irish Rifles, which he had raised, in September 1914 and was appointed second-in-command in December 1914. He was promoted to the temporary rank of Lieutenant-Colonel and commanded a battalion from November 1916 and commanded a battalion of the Royal Munster Fusiliers from May 1918. He was seriously wounded during the war. He resigned his commission in January 1919.

He was appointed to the Privy Council of Ireland in the honours for the opening of the Parliament of Northern Ireland in July 1921, entitling him to the style "The Right Honourable". He served in the Northern Ireland Senate from 1921 to 1925.

In 1895, he married Edith Grace Head. They had five sons: John Robert Perceval-Maxwell (born 1896), Richard Henry (born 1897, killed in action in 1916), Patrick Edward (born 1900), Brian Stephen (born 1908), and David (born 1911).

He died in 1932 in a Belfast nursing home, aged 62.
