= William Robert Young =

Irish linen merchant, politician and philanthropist

The Right Honourable William Robert Young DL
- Born: c. 1856; Galgorm Castle, Ballymena, County Antrim, Ireland
- Died: 12 September 1933 (aged 76–77)
- Occupation(s): Linen merchant, politician, philanthropist

William Robert Young PC (Ire) DL (c.1856 – 12 September 1933) was an Irish linen merchant, politician and philanthropist.

Young was born at Galgorm Castle, Ballymena, County Antrim. He was educated at Harrow School and then joined the family firm of J. & R. Young of Belfast. A prominent Unionist, he was appointed to the Privy Council of Ireland in the honours for the opening of the Parliament of Northern Ireland in July 1921 for his charitable work, entitling him to the style "The Right Honourable".
