= Henry Wynne (solicitor) =

Irish solicitor

Sir Henry Arthur Wynne, PC (14 June 1867 – 21 August 1943) was an Irish solicitor. He was Chief Crown Solicitor for Ireland from 1916 to 1922.

He was knighted in 1919 and sworn of the Privy Council of Ireland in 1922, one of the last three to be appointed.
