= Thomas Waite (civil servant) =

Irish civil servant

Thomas Waite (11 November 1718 – 2 February 1780), was an English civil servant who worked in Ireland. He was born in Richmond in Yorkshire.

A Thomas Waite acted as a Hanovarian spymaster in the aftermath of the Jacobite Rising of 1745-46, receiving reports from agents who had infiltrated Jacobite networks, and reporting to John Sharpe (c.1700 - 1756), the Treasury solicitor.

This was possibly the same Thomas Waite who was Under-Secretary for Ireland to the Chief Secretary for Ireland between 1747 and 1777. He was also Secretary to the Lords Justices of Ireland during the long absences from Ireland of the Lord Lieutenant and Chief Secretary for Ireland in the period up to 1767.

== Sources ==
- PRONI - Wilmot Papers (T3019)
