= William Patrick Byrne =

Sir William Patrick Byrne KCVO CB PC (Ire) (12 February 1859 – 11 June 1935) was a senior member of the British Civil Service.

== Early life and education ==
The fourth son of John Byrne, of Withington, Manchester, he was educated at Ushaw College and then at St Bede's College, Manchester, from 1876 to 1879, during which time he passed his Civil Service Examinations. He proceeded to study law at London University, gaining his degree in 1881 and was called to the bar at Gray's Inn.

== Career ==
In 1908, Byrne was elected a Bencher and served as Principal Clerk in the Home Office 1896–1908, he then served as Assistant Undersecretary of State for the Home Department from 1908 to 1914, and was involved in dealing with the suffragettes protest movement. He served as Secretary of the Baronetage 1908-1913.

Between 1913 and 1921, Byrne served as Chairman of the Board of Control for Lunacy and Mental Deficiency. From 1914 to 1916, he was Chairman of the Civilian Internment Camps Committee, organizing the internment of enemy aliens on the Isle of Man.

From 1915 to 1916, Byrne served two terms as Treasurer of Gray's Inn and as Undersecretary to the Lord Lieutenant of Ireland.

== Honours ==
Byrne was appointed CB in the 1902 Coronation Honours and KCVO in the 1911 Coronation Honours.
