= James Macmahon =

Irish civil servant and businessman

The Right Honourable James Macmahon

Under-Secretary for Ireland
- In office 1918–1922

Personal details
- Born: 20 April 1865 Belfast, Ireland
- Died: 1 May 1954 (aged 89)
- Occupation: Civil servant, businessman

James Macmahon PC (Ire) (20 April 1865 – 1 May 1954) was an Irish civil servant and businessman.

Macmahon was born in Belfast and raised as a Roman Catholic. He was educated at St Patrick's College, Armagh and Blackrock College in Dublin. He joined the Irish Post Office, being promoted to Assistant Secretary in 1913 and Secretary in 1916. In 1918, he became Under-Secretary for Ireland.

There was a need to decode the coded messages sent to the Dublin Castle administration from London. Macmahon appointed GPO worker Nancy O'Brien due to her dedication and purported lack of interest in politics. However, O'Brien was a second cousin of Michael Collins, and each day, between 2:30 and 3:30, she would pass any salient information she acquired to either Joe McGrath, Liam Tobin or Desmond FitzGerald.

Macmahon was appointed to the Privy Council of Ireland in the 1920 New Year Honours, entitling him to the style "The Right Honourable". He remained Under-Secretary until his retirement on the formation of the Irish Free State in 1922. He went into business in Dublin. In 1947, he was elected president of the Royal Dublin Society. He died on 1 May 1954, aged 89.

== Footnotes ==
Government offices
Preceded by Sir William Byrne	Under-Secretary for Ireland; 1918–1922	Office abolished
