= Anthony Richard Blake =

Irish lawyer

Anthony Richard Blake (1786–1849), was an Irish lawyer, administrator and 'backstairs Viceroy of Ireland'.

Blake, the second son of Martin Blake of Holly Park, Athenry, was a member of the Tribes of Galway. A granduncle was Anthony Blake, Archbishop of Armagh. He was admitted to Lincoln's Inn, London, on 13 May 1808. He became a protégé of Charles Butler, collecting data on Irish catholic affairs for him during 1811–12, which led to Butler's recommending him to the catholic committee as press officer. In 1813 he was called to the Bar.

In 1821 Blake travelled to Ireland in the cabinet of Lord Wellesley, being made Chief Remembrancer of the Exchequer of Ireland two years later (which made him the first catholic to hold the post since the reformation). This position enabled him to retain "a unique importance as adviser to British ministers and as their link with catholic interests in Ireland." and, by Act of Parliament, brought him an annual income of £3,000 Irish pounds; In 1843 this sum was reduced by Act of Parliament to £2,000.

On 24 June 1824, he was appointed to the Royal Commission for inquiring into the nature and extent of the Instruction afforded by the several Institutions in Ireland established for the purpose of Education where he served with the other Commissioners: Thomas Frankland Lewis, John Leslie Foster, William Grant and James Glassford.

He was on generally good terms with Daniel O'Connell, though the latter was to accuse the government of using Blake as a token catholic. Blake's catholic enemies portrayed him as an ambitious layman, with interests inimical to the church.

In 1828 he published "Thoughts upon the catholic question, by an Irish Roman Catholic" which analysed the Irish question and made a number of recommendations to the British government:

- - make an agreement with the Vatican
- - conciliate Irish catholic demands
- - provide for the poor
- - extend voter's franchise

In 1831 he was a member of Lord Anglesey's 'inner conclave', and helped develop the scheme of national education, particularly encouraging teacher training. He served on the Poor Law Inquiry of 1833, serving on committees on tithes, education and mortmain. He also played a role in the establishment of the Queen's Colleges in the late 1840s, a deeply divisive issue among Irish Catholics.

Upon his death in January 1849, he left a substantial bequest to the national education system.
