= Privy Council of Ireland =

Government body during British rule

His or Her Majesty's Privy Council in Ireland, commonly called the Privy Council of Ireland, Irish Privy Council, or in earlier centuries the Irish Council, was the institution within the Dublin Castle administration which exercised formal executive power in conjunction with the chief governor of Ireland, who was viceroy of the British monarch. The council evolved in the Lordship of Ireland on the model of the Privy Council of England; as the English council advised the king in person, so the Irish council advised the viceroy, who in medieval times was a powerful Lord Deputy. In the early modern period the council gained more influence at the expense of the viceroy, but in the 18th century lost influence to the Parliament of Ireland. In the post-1800 United Kingdom of Great Britain and Ireland, the Irish Privy Council and viceroy Lord Lieutenant had formal and ceremonial power, while policy formulation rested with a Chief Secretary directly answerable to the British cabinet. The council comprised senior public servants, judges, and parliamentarians, and eminent men appointed for knowledge of public affairs or as a civic honour.

== Role ==
As in England, the medieval unitary king's council evolved into distinct bodies, the smallest being the privy council, of senior advisors to the king (or, in Ireland's case, to the king's representative). Others were the great council, which evolved into the Parliament of Ireland, and the afforced council, an ad-hoc body of intermediate size.

The privy council played a leading role in directing the Tudor conquest of Ireland. It established and delegated to Presidencies in Munster and in Connaught, while directly supervising Leinster. Although the chief governor was appointed by the monarch under the Great Seal of England, a 1542 statute legalised the existing practice of an interim Lord Justice being elected by a meeting of the Irish council summoned by the Lord Chancellor of Ireland, as when William Drury was elected in 1579 between Henry Sidney's recall and Lord Grey's arrival. Charles I ordered the Lord Deputy to reform the "negligent meeting" of the privy council's committees. The Act of Explanation 1665 empowered the viceroy and council to override the royal charters of municipal corporations; the resulting "New Rules", which governed many major towns from 1672 until the Municipal Corporations (Ireland) Act 1840, allowed the council to veto the corporation's choice of mayor. This power was controversially used in Dublin in 1711–1714 to keep out Whigs, and in Cork in 1835 to keep out an Orangeman. The 1665 act also established a commission to resolve doubts over the Act of Settlement 1662; when the commission found further ambiguities in the 1665 act's terms of reference, it applied to the "Lord Lieutenant and Council" to resolve them.

Poynings' Law (1495) gave the Irish Privy Council a leading role in the legislative process. Before the council summoned each new Parliament (with a general election to the Commons) it had to submit the Parliament's bills to the Privy Council of England for approval as "causes and considerations" for the summons. Initially, all bills were by the Irish council, and the Commons and Lords could pass or reject, but not amend them. By the 18th century, a legal fiction arose where Parliament debated "heads of a bill" and petitioned the council to introduce it; the council could still amend or reject these "heads". Private bills were always initiated by the council until the Williamite revolution. The council gradually stopped initiating any bills beyond two "causes and considerations" bills, one of which was always a money bill, to which the Commons objected as violating its control of supply. The Patriot Party defeated the 1768 "Privy Council Money Bill", heralding an increase in parliamentary sovereignty which culminated in the Constitution of 1782, which removed the Irish Privy Council from the legislative process. (The British Privy Council retained the right to veto Irish bills, but not to amend them.)

Orders in Council were issued by the chief governor with the advice and consent of the Privy Council. From Elizabeth to Charles I, the Irish council filled the legislative gap during long intervals between Irish parliaments by passing "Acts of State", justified on grounds similar to those latterly used for Charles' Personal Rule. The governor could issue proclamations without the council on routine matters, but on important policy questions needed the council's agreement. The 1724 defeat of Wood's halfpence came after the Irish privy council sided with the Irish parliament in opposition to the British government and refused to intercede between parliament and the Lord Lieutenant, Lord Carteret.

The Irish council developed a judicial role later than the Privy Council of England, with the Court of Castle Chamber sitting in Dublin Castle from 1571 to 1641.

Privy Councillors had a right of audience with the viceroy, and many men were anxious to become members purely for this access and took little or no part in council business. Charles II's 1679 plan to reduce the number to 20 or 30 was not acted on. By the eighteenth century, there were over 100 councillors, few of whom usually attended meetings. Nevertheless, the viceroy informally consulted an inner circle before the formal council meetings, in order to expedite decision-making. In Great Britain a similar process led to the evolution of this inner circle or "cabinet" into the de facto government while the full privy council became a ceremonial body. Ireland's dependency and lack of responsible government prevented such a definitive division there. The oath of office for senior positions in the administration was taken at a council meeting. Latterly such offices as Vice-Treasurer of Ireland were sinecures whose holders might secure a private act of the British parliament allowing them to take the oath in Britain to save the bother of travelling to Dublin.

Although the Acts of Union 1800 abolished the Kingdom of Ireland and its parliament, its Privy Council (like the Lord Lieutenant) was retained, alternatives —abolishing the Irish council or merging it with the British one— receiving little consideration. In 1801 Lord Pelham, a former Chief Secretary for Ireland, became British Home Secretary and assumed that his office now extended to Ireland, but viceroy Philip Yorke, 3rd Earl of Hardwicke insisted that the silence of the 1800 acts regarding the Irish council implied that its assent remained obligatory for effecting government orders. Ireland under the Union had some government bodies answerable to the viceroy and Council and others which were divisions of Whitehall departments; however, a lack of collegiality prevented the Irish council becoming a rival power centre. In 1850 the First Russell ministry proposed to abolish the Lord Lieutenant and transfer some of his statutory functions to Privy Council of Ireland. Opposing this, Thomas Chisholm Anstey said, "The Privy Council of Ireland, like that of England, though the chief council for purposes of State, he regretted to say, was never summoned unless on holyday occasions, its duties having been usurped by the Cabinet Council, a body unknown to the common law."

In 1852 the Privy Council Office was merged into the Chief Secretary's Office. Latterly the council's executive role was merely formal and ceremonial. Of ten meetings held from August 1886 to January 1887, attendance ranged from four (including three Lords Justices) to ten (including the Lord Lieutenant). There was controversy over the proclamations issued by the council under the Criminal Law and Procedure (Ireland) Act 1887, since among the signatories were senior judges who might hear appeals against sentences handed down under the act. Sir Michael Morris, the Lord Chief Justice of Ireland, stated that in his 20 years attending council meetings, no "matter of policy" was discussed.

In the 19th century, petitions to the Privy Council against decisions of various administrative bodies were referred to committees of councillors with legal experience. Most committees were ad hoc, but there were statutory "judicial committees" (comprising current or former senior judges) relating to the Encumbered Estates' Court (1849–58) and Local Government (Ireland) Act 1898. Other committees heard appeals under the Tramways and Public Companies (Ireland) Act 1883, Educational Endowments (Ireland) Act 1885, Labourers (Ireland) Act 1885, and Irish Education Acts 1892 and 1893. The Veterinary Department of the Irish Privy Council, established 1866–72, was "most peculiarly constituted", having no corresponding committee of the council; it became the Veterinary Branch of the Department of Agriculture and Technical Instruction upon the latter's 1900 establishment. The Privy Council's Irish Universities Committee was established in 1908 to hear petitions relating to the National University of Ireland (NUI) and Queen's University Belfast (QUB).

== Supersession ==
Although the Government of Ireland Act 1920 provided for the partition of Ireland into Northern Ireland and Southern Ireland, it had some all-island institutions, retaining the Privy Council, of which the northern and southern governments would technically be executive committees. Accordingly, the members of the first Executive Committee for Northern Ireland, the Craigavon ministry, were sworn of the Privy Council of Ireland in May 1921 immediately before Lord Lieutenant Viscount FitzAlan appointed them to their ministries. The 64 Southern Senators included eight elected by Privy Councillors from among their membership. If the Southern Commons was inquorate, the Lord Lieutenant could replace the Southern Parliament with a committee of Privy Councillors, a provision dubbed "Crown Colony government". During the Anglo-Irish War the 1921 Southern election was won by abstentionsts of Sinn Féin, and the "Crown Colony" provision seemed likely to be invoked, but a truce was agreed leading to the Anglo-Irish Treaty. The British initially hoped the resulting Provisional Government could be appointed under the "Crown Colony" provision, but realised ministers from Sinn Féin would refuse the Privy Council oath, and instead the Irish Free State (Agreement) Act 1922 replaced much of the 1920 act as regards Southern Ireland.

It was in the Council Chamber on 16 January 1922 that Viscount FitzAlan formally handed over control of the Dublin Castle administration to the Provisional Government of what would on 6 December become the Irish Free State. However, no meeting of the Privy Council of Ireland was held to mark the occasion, the Provisional Government had no dealings with the council, and some of its few remaining meetings were in Northern Ireland. For example, the honours list for the inauguration of the Northern Parliament gave Council membership to William Robert Young, and he was sworn in on 24 October 1922 in Galgorm Castle, Ballymena before a bare quorum of four other Counsellors; a larger council meeting was held later the same day at Stormont Castle, Belfast. The final appointments to the Privy Council were those of Charles Curtis Craig, William Henry Holmes Lyons, and Henry Arthur Wynne on 28 November 1922, on the recommendation of James Craig, the Prime Minister of Northern Ireland. The last Order in Council was made on 5 December 1922. When the Constitution of the Irish Free State came into force the next day, the UK's Irish Free State (Consequential Provisions) Act 1922 created the Governor and Privy Council of Northern Ireland to perform the functions previously performed there by the Lord Lieutenant and Privy Council of Ireland. The first Governor was appointed on 9 December 1922, and on 12 December was sworn in and in turn appointed Craig's cabinet to the Privy Council of Northern Ireland. In the Irish Free State, statutory references to "Order in Council, or by the King (or Queen) in Council, or by Proclamation of the King (or Queen) or of the King (or Queen) in Council" were changed to "Order of the Governor-General upon the advice of the Executive Council".

Although never formally abolished, the Privy Council of Ireland ceased to have any functions and did not meet again. The Chief Secretary's chair was taken from the Council Chamber in Dublin Castle to serve as the chair of the Cathaoirleach of Seanad Éireann. In 1930, the meaning of appeal to "His Majesty in Council" (in the Free State Constitution and Anglo-Irish Treaty) was disputed in a case at the Judicial Committee of the UK Privy Council in London (JCPC). One party claimed that "His Majesty in Council" ought to mean the Privy Council of Ireland, but the JCPC ruled that it meant the JCPC itself. In 1931 The Irish Times reported a rumour that the Free State government was seeking to transfer the JCPC's appellate jurisdiction to a revived Privy Council of Ireland. The Parliamentary Gazette, an unofficial reference work, continued to publish lists of members of the "Privy Council in Ireland" as late as 1934. Official sources after 1922 occasionally retained the style "Rt Hon" for members of the dormant Irish Privy Council; for example in Oireachtas proceedings of Andrew Jameson, Bryan Mahon, and James Macmahon, and in The London Gazette of Henry Givens Burgess. Hugh O'Neill, 1st Baron Rathcavan was the last surviving Irish Privy Councillor; appointed on 16 September 1921, he died on 28 November 1982.

While the Irish Universities Committee was succeeded in relation to QUB by a committee of the Privy Council of Northern Ireland, in the Republic of Ireland in 1973 Seanad Éireann expressed concern that there was no way to process petitions relating to the NUI because "the Privy Council in Ireland is non-existent".

== Members ==
Technically there were no ex officio members of the council, as appointment was by letters patent after swearing a specific oath of office at a council meeting. However, holders of certain offices were "sworn of the council" as a matter of course. Councillors in the time of Elizabeth I included the Chancellor of Ireland, Treasurer of Ireland, Chief Baron of the Irish Exchequer, Master of the Rolls in Ireland, Lord Chief Justice of Ireland, Chief Justice of the Common Pleas for Ireland, a puisne judge, the Vice-Treasurer of Ireland, and the Church of Ireland Archbishop of Dublin and Bishop of Meath. In the 17th century, the Privy Council mostly comprised Irish peers, many of whom were absentees in England, so that only a fraction attended council meetings. In the 18th century more members of the Commons were appointed. The Commander-in-Chief, Ireland was a member. By the 19th century the Attorney-General for Ireland was a member as were many senior judges; Charles Dod contrasted this with the equivalent officers in England and Wales, who received knighthoods. The chief governor attended meetings but was not a member of the council; a former Lord Lieutenant might be sworn in as a member after stepping down. After the Church of Ireland's 1871 disestablishment its archbishops of Dublin and Armagh were no longer appointed.

James II appointed Catholic Richard Talbot, 1st Earl of Tyrconnell as Lord Deputy and appointed Catholics to the council, including judges and Richard Nagle. Tyrconnell objected to Nagle on the ground that he was undignified as a practising barrister. Later penal laws prevented Catholic Privy Councillors until the Roman Catholic Relief Act 1829 changed the oath of office, the next being Anthony Richard Blake in 1836. In 1846 Daniel Murray, the Catholic Archbishop of Dublin, was offered a place on the council.

The role of Secretary of the Council and Keeper of the Privy Seal of Ireland was filled by the Secretary of State [for Ireland] while that office existed (1560–1802) and the Chief Secretary for Ireland thereafter. The office of Clerk of the council was by the 18th century a sinecure, held from 1786 by Henry Agar, later 2nd Viscount Clifden. After Clifden's death in 1836, the Public Offices (Ireland) Act 1817 applied, and the senior deputy clerk became "First Clerk of the Council, Usher, and Keeper of the Council Chamber", positions merged in 1852 with that of Chief Clerk to the Secretary (in 1876 renamed Assistant Under-Secretary).

== Ceremonial ==
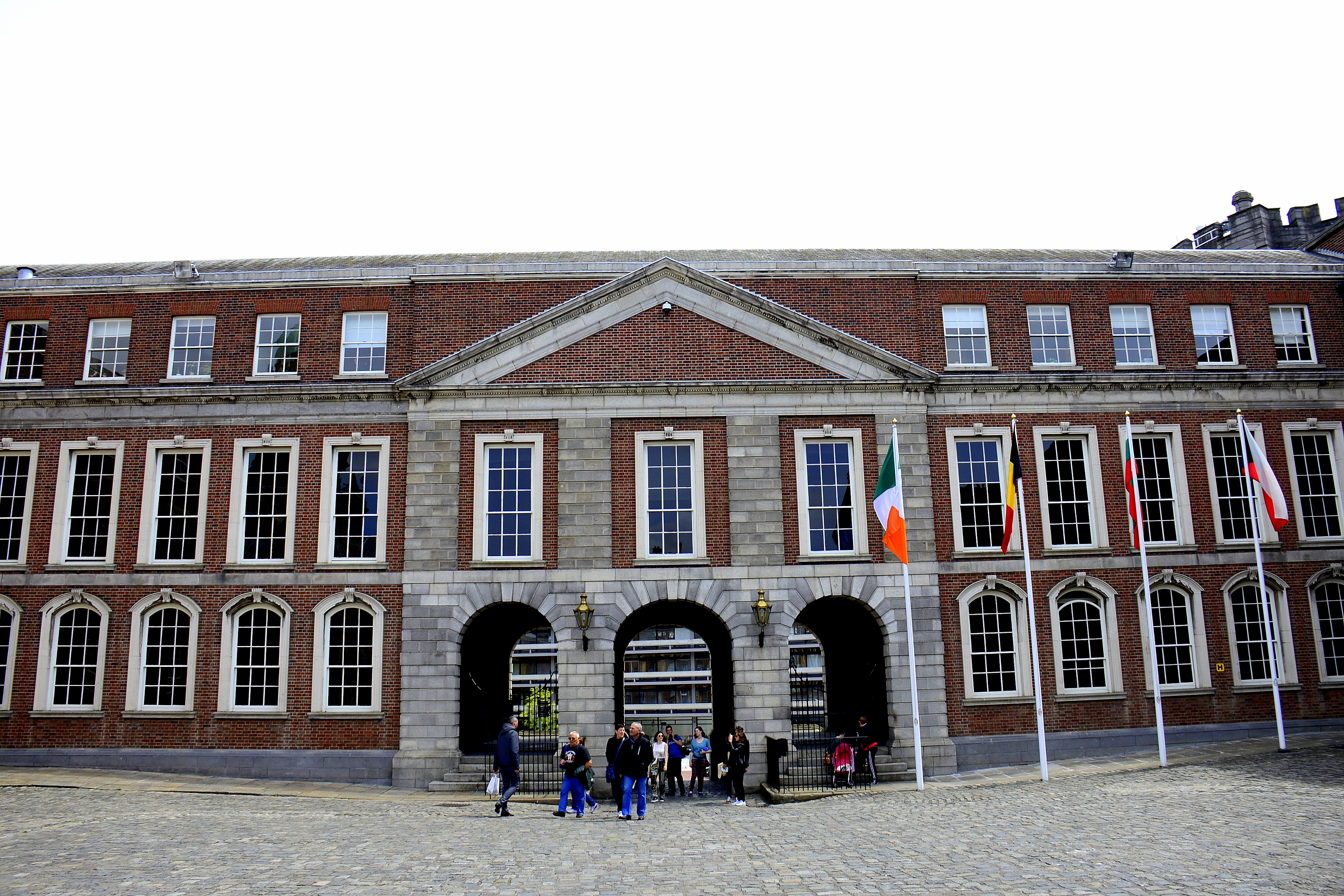
The Council Chamber (1712–1922) was above the archway in Dublin Castle

For most of its existence the council met in the Council Chamber in Dublin Castle, where new councillors took their oath of office and from which Orders in Council were issued. A room over the chapel built by Philip Sidney in 1567 had "a very long table, furnished with stools at both sides and ends [where] sometimes sit in council about 60 or 64 privy councillors". Charles I sent the English Privy Council's rules of order to Ireland with some extra orders including "No man shall speak at the Council Board covered, save only the Deputy." In 1655 during the Protectorate the council moved to the old Custom House on Essex Quay. After a 1711 fire destroyed its chamber and archives, it returned to Dublin Castle to a new Council Chamber above the archway linking the Upper and Lower Yards. By 1907 only members living near Dublin would receive a summons to ordinary meetings of the council. The Council Chamber was obliterated when the wing was reconstructed in the 1950s.

Members of the Privy Council of Ireland were entitled to the style "Right Honourable" (abbreviated "Rt Hon") in the same way as those of the Privy Council of Great Britain. In writing, the post-nominal letters "PC" could be used, or "PC (Ire)" to avoid confusion with any other privy council.

== Records ==
Most of the council's records were lost in either the 1711 fire or the 1922 destruction of the Public Record Office of Ireland. Exceptions include the 1556–1571 council book bequeathed by Charles Haliday to the Royal Irish Academy and published in 1897 by the Historical Manuscripts Commission, and a portion of the 1392–3 proceedings owned by the Marquess of Ormond and published in 1877 in the Rolls Series. A calendar of the 1581–1586 council book made in the 1860s by John P. Prendergast was published in 1967.

== See also ==
- Council of State (Ireland)
- Judicial Committee of the Privy Council and the Irish Free State
- List of Northern Ireland members of the Privy Council of the United Kingdom
- List of Privy Counsellors of Ireland
- Privy Council (Northern Ireland)

== Sources ==
- Costello, Peter (1999). Dublin Castle in the life of the Irish nation. Dublin: Wolfhound. ISBN 978-0-86327-610-1 – via Internet Archive.
- Crawford, Jon G. (1993). Anglicizing the Government of Ireland: The Irish Privy Council and the Expansion of Tudor Rule, 1556–1578. Irish Academic Press. ISBN 978-0-7165-2498-4.
- Hutchinson, Mark A. (2014). "The Emergence of the State in Elizabethan Ireland and England, ca. 1575–99". The Sixteenth Century Journal. 45 (3): 659–682. doi:10.1086/SCJ24245958. ISSN 0361-0160. JSTOR 24245958. S2CID 146831330.
- McDowell, R. B. (1976). The Irish administration, 1801–1914. Westport, Conn: Greenwood Press. ISBN 978-0-8371-8561-3.
- O'Flanagan, James Roderick (1870). The Lives of the Lord Chancellors and Keepers of the Great Seal of Ireland. London: Longmans, Green. Vol. I, Vol. II.
- Quekett, Arthur S. (1933). The Constitution Of Northern Ireland. Vol. II. Belfast: HMSO.
- Richardson, H. G.; Sayles, G. O. (1964). The Irish Parliament in the Middle ages. Philadelphia: University of Pennsylvania Press. Chapters 3 "Secretum Consilium" and 12 "The Privy Council in the Fifteenth Century"
- Steele, Robert (1910). "The Council of Ireland and its Proclamations". Bibliography of royal proclamations of the Tudor and Stuart sovereigns and of others published under authority, 1485–1714; Vol. I. Bibliotheca Lindesiana. Vol. V. Oxford: Clarendon Press. pp. cxvii–cxxxv – via National Library of Scotland.
