= Aitken (surname) =

The surname Aitken /ˈeɪtkɪn/ is derived from the Lowland Scots personal name Aitken, which is in turn a form of the name Adam.

The name Aitken may refer to:

- 8 Ball Aitken (born 1981), Australian musician
- Abbi Aitken-Drummond (born 1991), Scottish cricketer
- A. J. Aitken (1921–1998), Scottish lexicographer
- Alexander Aitken (1895–1967), New Zealand mathematician
- Alexander Aitken (rugby union) (1869–1925), Scotland international rugby union player
- Andy or Andrew Aitken (disambiguation)
- Anne Hopkins Aitken (1911–1994), American Buddhist
- Aubrey Aitken (1911–1985), second Bishop of Lynn
- Ashleigh Aitken, American politician elected mayor of Anaheim, California, in 2022
- Bill Aitken (politician) (born 1947), Scottish politician
- Bill Aitken (traveller) (1934–2025), Scottish-born Indian travel writer
- Brad Aitken (born 1967), Canadian ice-hockey player
- Brian Aitken, 21st century American libertarian activist convicted on gun-related charges and subsequently pardoned
- Charles Aitken (1869–1936), English art administrator
- Charlie Aitken (footballer, born 1932) (1932–2008), Scottish footballer
- Charlie Aitken (footballer, born 1942) (1942–2023), Scottish footballer
- Chris Aitken (born 1979), Scottish footballer and manager
- Chris Aitken (Australian footballer) (born 1948), Australian rugby player
- David D. Aitken (1853–1930), American politician
- David Aitken (minister) (1796–1875), Scottish minister and church historian
- Edith Aitken (1861–1940), British headmistress
- Edward Hamilton Aitken (1851–1909), Anglo-Indian writer
- Ewan Aitken (born 1962), Scottish politician and Church of Scotland minister
- George Aitken (disambiguation)
- Glenn Aitken (footballer), English football player
- Glenn Aitken (singer), London-based New Zealand singer-songwriter and musician
- Glenn Aitken, mayor of the City of Frankston, Australia (2007–2008)
- Harry Aitken (1877–1956), American silent film producer
- Hayley Aitken (born 1986), Australian singer
- Hugh Aitken (composer) (1924–2012), American composer
- Hugh Aitken (curler), Scottish curler
- Hugh G. J. Aitken (1922–1994), American scholar, recipient of the Leonardo da Vinci Medal
- Ian Aitken (journalist) (1927–2018), British journalist and political commentator
- Ian Aitken (footballer) (born 1967), former Australian rules footballer
- Jack Aitken (born 1995), British-Korean racing driver
- Jacqueline Wilson (born 1945), British children's writer born Jacqueline Aitken
- James Aitken (disambiguation)
- Janet Gladys Aitken (1908–1988), Canadian-British socialite
- Janet Macdonald Aitken (1873–1941), Scottish artist
- Jim Aitken (born 1947), Scottish rugby player
- Jimmy Aitken (1872–1944), former Australian rules footballer
- John Aitken (disambiguation)
- Johnny Aitken (1885–1918), American racing driver
- Johnathan Aitken (born 1978), Canadian ice-hockey player
- Jonathan Aitken (born 1942), British former Conservative minister and convict
- Kate Aitken (1891–1971), Canadian radio and television broadcaster
- Kelley Aitken, Canadian writer
- Laurel Aitken (1927–2005), Cuban-Jamaican ska musician
- Margaret Aitken (1906–1980), Canadian author, columnist, journalist and politician
- Margaret Aitken (witch) (died 1597), Scottish confessed witch who implicated many innocent women
- Maria Aitken (born 1945), British actress
- Matt Aitken (born 1956), British songwriter and record producer
- Matt Aitken (special effects artist), 20th-21st century American special effects artist
- Max Aitken, 1st Baron Beaverbrook (1879–1964), Canadian-British business tycoon and politician
- Sir Max Aitken, 2nd Baronet (1910–1985), British press baron and politician
- Maxwell Aitken, 3rd Baron Beaverbrook (born 1951), British politician
- Michael James Aitken (born 1957), Australian economist and entrepreneur
- Nicholas Aitken, (born 1955), aka Wilbur Wilde, Australian saxophonist
- Pauline Aitken (1893–1958), British artist
- Penelope Aitken (1910–2005), British socialite
- Robert Aitken (disambiguation)
- Robin Aitken (born 1952), British journalist
- Roy Aitken (born 1958), Scottish football player and manager
- Russell Aitken (born 1985), Australian rugby league player
- Russell Aitken (RAF officer) (1913–1989), New Zealand Second World War Royal Air Force pilot
- Sally Aitken (academic) (born 1961), Canadian environmentalist
- Sally Aitken (director), 21st century Australian film director
- Samuel Aitken (1878–1930), Scottish footballer
- Violet Aitken (1886–1987), British suffragette who was force-fed
- William Aitken (disambiguation)

== See also ==
- Aiken (surname)
- Aitkens
- Aitken (disambiguation)
- Aitkin (disambiguation)
- Atkin (disambiguation)
