= Atkin =

Atkin is an English surname derived from a pet form of the name Adam. Notable people with the surname include:

- A. O. L. Atkin (1925–2008), British mathematician
- George Atkin (1836–1899), American politician
- Harvey Atkin (1942–2017), Canadian actor
- Isabel Atkin (born 1998), British-American skier
- Jade Atkin (born 2001), British wheelchair basketball player
- Jerry Atkin (born 1949), American businessman
- John Atkin (fl. 1980s), American politician
- Leon Atkin (1902–1976), British minister, human rights activist, and politician
- Paul Atkin (born 1969), English footballer
- Pete Atkin (born 1945), British singer-songwriter
- Polly Atkin, English poet and non-fiction writer
- Ralph Atkin (born 1943), American businessman
- Richard Atkin, Baron Atkin (1867–1944), British judge
- Robert Travers Atkin (1841–1872), Irish-Australian politician
- Tim Atkin, British journalist, broadcaster, and commentator
- Tommy Atkin (1906–1986), English footballer
- Victoria Atkin (born 1986), English actress
- Wendy Atkin (1947–2018), British professor

== See also ==
- Atkin & Low family tree, showing the relationship between some of the above
- Sieve of Atkin, mathematical algorithm
- Atkins (disambiguation)
- Atkins (surname)
- Atkinson (disambiguation)
- Atkinson (surname)
- Aitken (disambiguation)
- Adkins
- Adkinson
