= Adkins =

Adkins is a surname of English origin derived from a diminutive form for Adam. Notable people with the surname include:

- Adele Adkins (born 1988), British singer
- Allen Adkins (1929–1999), American racing driver
- Amanda Adkins (born 1974/1975), American politician and businesswoman
- Amanda Adkins (swimmer) (born 1976), American swimmer
- A. W. H. Adkins (1929–1996), British classical scholar
- Bennie G. Adkins (1934–2020), United States soldier; recipient of the Medal of Honor
- Bertha Adkins (1906–1983), American educator, political activist, public servant, and community leader
- Betty Adkins (1938–2001), American politician
- Betty Viana-Adkins (born 1971), Venezuelan bodybuilder
- Bob Adkins (1917–1997), American football player
- Brad Adkins (born 1973), American artist
- Bradley Adkins (born 1993), American track and field athlete
- Cecelia Adkins (1923–2007), American publisher
- Charles Adkins (politician) (1863–1931), American politician
- Charles Adkins (boxer) (1932–1993), American boxer
- Damien Adkins (born 1981), Australian footballer
- Dan Adkins (1937–2013), American illustrator
- Sinbad (born David Adkins in 1956), American actor/comedian
- David E. Adkins, American businessman, pastor, and politician
- Derrick Adkins (born 1970), American sprinter
- Dewey Adkins (1918–1998), American baseball player
- Dick Adkins (1920–1955), American baseball player
- Doc Adkins (1872–1934) American pitcher in Major League Baseball
- Dorothy Adkins (1912–1975), American psychologist
- Doug Adkins (born 1963), American country musician and songwriter
- Elizabeth W. Adkins (born 1957), American archivist
- George Adkins (1910–1976), New Zealand rugby player
- Grady Adkins (1897–1966), American baseball player
- Greg Adkins (born 1968), American football player and coach
- Hasil Adkins (1937–2005), American musician
- Homer Burton Adkins (1892–1949), American chemist
- Homer Martin Adkins (1890–1964), Governor of Arkansas
- James Adkins (born 1985), American baseball player
- James A. Adkins (born 1954), Adjutant General of Maryland
- James C. Adkins (1915–1994), American politician
- James Edward Adkins (1867–1939), Irish organist and composer
- Janet Adkins (born 1965), American politician
- Jesse C. Adkins (1876–1955), American politician
- Jim Adkins (born 1975), American singer and guitarist for the band Jimmy Eat World
- John Rainey Adkins (1941–1989), American guitarist and songwriter
- John Scudder Adkins (1872–1931), American architect
- Jon Adkins (born 1977), American baseball player
- Joseph Adkins (1815–1869), American politician
- Lesley Adkins (born 1955), English writer and archaeologist
- Margene Adkins (born 1947), American football player
- Mark Adkins, lead vocalist of the band Guttermouth
- Minnie Adkins (born 1934), American folk artist
- Monty Adkins (born 1972), British composer
- Nate Adkins (born 1999), American football player
- Nigel Adkins (born 1965), English footballer
- Patricia Adkins Chiti (died 2018), English singer and musicologist
- Patrick H. Adkins (1948–2015), American fantasy author
- Pete Adkins (born 1924), American football coach
- Robert Adkins (1626–1685), English minister
- Rocky Adkins (born 1959), American politician
- Roy Adkins (born 1951), English writer and archaeologist
- Roy Francis Adkins (1947–1990), English gangster
- Roy Adkins (American football) (1898–1975), American football player
- Rutherford H. Adkins (1924–1996), American soldier
- Ryland Adkins (1862–1925), English barrister, judge and politician
- Sally D. Adkins (born 1950), American judge
- Sam Adkins (born 1955), American football player
- Sam Adkins (born 1965), American mixed martial artist
- Sam Adkins (born 1991), English footballer
- Scott Adkins (born 1976), English actor and martial artist
- Seth Adkins (born 1989), American actor
- Spencer Adkins (born 1987), American football player
- Steve Adkins (born 1964), American baseball player
- Taylor Adkins, American translator (of François Laruelle & Félix Guattari) and Independent Researcher
- Terry Adkins (1953–2014), American artist
- Tommy Adkins (1932–2013), American football player
- Trace Adkins (born 1962), American country singer-songwriter
- W. J. Adkins (1907–1965), American educator
- Walter Knight-Adkin (1880–1957), Anglican priest
- Walter Scott Adkins (1890–1956), American geologist and paleontologist
- William H. Adkins II (1925–2003), justice of the Maryland Court of Appeals
- Winthrop Adkins (1932–2015), Syrian-born American psychologist and educator

== See also ==
- Adkins, Texas, unincorporated community, United States
- Justice Adkins (disambiguation)
- Adkinson
- Aitken (disambiguation)
- Aitkin (disambiguation)
- Atkins (disambiguation)
- Atkinson (disambiguation)
- Elkin (disambiguation)
