= Akins =

Scottish surname and northern Irish family name

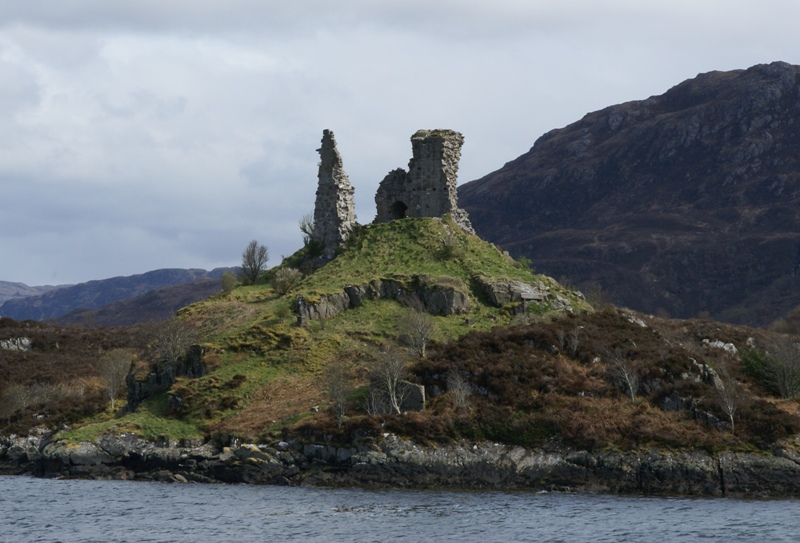
- Kyleakin, Isle of Skye, Scotland: it is said that in some cases the surname Akins may have originated from this location.
- Language: Scots

Origin
- Meaning: 1. variant of Aiken, derived from Adam; 2. derived from the place name Kyleakin, meaning 'Haakon's Sound', 'Haakon's Narrows'; 3. from aik, meaning 'oaken', 'an oak'; 4. from Atty, Arthur; 5. Anglicisation of the Irish Gaelic surname O'hAodhagain; 6. Anglicisation of the Irish surname Ó'hÓgáin
- Region of origin: Scotland

Other names
- Variant forms: Aickin; Aiken; Aikin; Aikins; Akin; Eakins; Hagan; Mac Aodhagáin; McEachin; O'hAodhagain

Akins (/ˈeɪkɪnz/ or locally /ˈɑːkɪnz/) is a Scottish surname and northern Irish family name.

== Origins ==
=== Scotland ===
The name has several possible origins, although it is generally considered to be a variant of Aikens, which is considered to be a patronymic form of the name Aiken. These names are considered to be derived from the Scots personal name Aitken, which is a double diminutive form of the Biblical name Adam. The name is formed in part from Ad, the diminutive of Adam (the d has been sharpened to t), and the diminutive suffix -kin. George Fraser Black stated that the -s in the surnames Atkins, and Aitkins, represents 'son'; and in consequence, that these names equate to Atkinson.

In 1946, Black noted that, according to John Paterson (in 1867), the surname Aiken was an old name in the parish of Ballantrae, Ayrshire; and that "in Orkney it is believed to have replaced the Old Norse name Haakon and its derivative Hakonson". Black also noted that the surname Aiken (and its variations: Aitken, Aitkin, Aitkins, Atkin, Atkins) have been stated by others to be derived from the names Atty ("little Atty"), and Arthur; although Black stated that he himself disagreed with this derivation, in favour of a diminutive of Adam (above).

In 1857, David MacGregor Peter noted a traditional derivation for the surname Aikman. The account states that the name Aikman originated from an officer who, while commanding troops that besieged Macbeth in Dunsinane Castle, told them to attack using oak branches. According to Peter, this officer was said to have been the progenitor of all Aikmans and Aikens in Scotland. Black, however, noted that this story was too silly to believe. In 1908, William Cutter noted the surname Aiken, and stated that antiquarians have derived the name from the word aik, meaning 'an oak', or 'oaken'. Black noted that within the heraldry of the name Aiken (and variations), the use oak is merely an example of canting heraldry.

Another possible derivation of the surname Akins, suggested by H. Amanda Robb and Andrew Chesler, as well as by Elsdon C. Smith, is that "the name was given to those who were from the area near Kyleakin, a strait in Scotland named for King Hakon of Norway". The strait's name is derived from the Scottish Gaelic Caol Acain, which means 'Haakon's Sound', or 'Haakon's Narrows'.

=== Ireland ===
In Ireland, the surname Aiken is considered to be of Scottish and English origin, and is most common in the province of Ulster. According to Robert Bell, Aiken is "the Scottish form of the English name Atkin, which comes from Adkin, a pet form of Adam." In the mid-19th century, the name was found to be the most popular in Ballymena, County Antrim. Michael C. O'Laughlin states that families of the surname Aiken (and variants: Ekin, Aikens, Aikins, Aicken, Aitken) are mostly of Scottish and English descent. O'Laughlin states that these names originate, in most cases, to the English name Aitken. Edward MacLysaght also notes that the Irish surname Aiken is the Scottish form of the English Aitken. According to William and Mary Durning, the names Aiken, Akins, and Eakin came to Ireland from Scotland during the Ulster Plantation of the 17th century where they were transplanted to the Irish counties of Antrim, Monaghan, and Down respectively.

In Ireland, the surname Aiken has also been used as an Anglicised form of an Irish language surname. O'Laughlin, and MacLysaght, note that Aiken as an Anglicised form of the Irish Ó hAodhagáin (frequently Anglicised as O'Hagan). The Irish Ó hAodhagáin means "descendant of Aodhagán". The personal name Aodhagán is a double diminutive of the name Aodh, which means "fire". Historically, the O'Hagans were centred in the County Tyrone; their chief was seated at Tullahogue, and had the hereditary right of inaugurating The O'Neill, as overlord of Ulster.

According to the Durnings, the surname Akin can also be an Anglicisation of the Irish name Ó hÓgáin (O'Eakin). The O'Eakins are stated to descend from the Irish Ui Tuirtre, who were descended from Fiach Tort, son of Colla Uais of the Oirghialla which were the descendants of Eochaid Doimlén, son of Cairbre Lifechair, son of Cormac Ulfhada and his wife Etaine, whose ancestry goes back another forty-nine generations in Ireland to its earliest Gaelic founders, the Milesians. MacLysaght notes that although the surname Aicken is generally of Scottish origin (as diminutive of Adam), it is also possibly an Anglicised form of the Irish Ó h-Aogáin.

== History ==
According to Black, the first recorded appearance of the Scottish surname Aiken (and its variations: Aitken, Aitkin, Aitkins, Atkin, Atkins) occurs in the year 1405, in the court records of a Scottish sea merchant named "John of Akyne", who sought restitution for having been illegally detained for eight weeks by "Laurence Tuttebury of Hulle". According to Black, the "of" in John's name is an error. The first recorded use of the Aiken (and above variants) as a Scottish forename occurs in about the 1340, when "Atkyn de Barr", and "Atkyn Blake", are recorded in Ayr. The surnames and given names have undergone a variety of transformations in spelling over the years, and in consequence there are many variant forms of the name still in use today.

== Distribution ==
A total of 77 Akins appear in the 1881 Census of Great Britain, and was ranked the 3,502nd most common surname. A total of 220 Akins appear in the 1996 Electoral roll of Great Britain, and is ranked 3,835th most common surname. In Griffith's Valuation, a property survey of Ireland from 1848 to 1864, records 3 households of Akins in Ireland; 2 in County Donegal, and 1 in County Monaghan. Variations of the name were said to have been common in the parish of Ballantrae, as well as in the counties of Aberdeen, Fife, Lanark, Perth, Angus, Renfrew, Ayr, Dumbarton, Stirling and the Lothians. In Ireland the name is common only in Ulster, where many Scots colonists settled in the 17th century.

There were 16,860 people with the surname Akins recorded in the 2000 United States census. It ranked as the 1,960th most common surname in the country. The surname was made up 65.59% White Americans, 30.34% Black Americans, 0.26% Asian Americans and Pacific Islander Americans, 0.73% American Indians and Alaska Natives, 1.7% Multiracial Americans, and 1.39% Hispanic Americans.

== List of persons with the surname ==
- Chris Akins (born 1976), American football player
- Claude Akins (1926–1994), American actor
- Ellen Akins American novelist
- Frank Akins (1919–1992), American football player
- James Akins, American classical tubist
- James E. Akins (1926–2010), U.S. Ambassador to Saudi Arabia
- Jordan Akins (born 1992), American football player
- Rhett Akins (born 1969), American singer-songwriter
- Sid Akins (born 1962), American baseball player
- Thomas Beamish Akins (1806–1891) Canadian historian
- Virgil Akins (1928–2011), American boxer
- Zoe Akins (1886–1958), American playwright, poet and author

== See also ==
- Akin (disambiguation)
- Aikins
