= Akin (surname) =

Akin is a surname. Notable people with the surname include:

- Albert J. Akin (1803–1903), American banker and philanthropist who funded the Akin Free Library
- Asım Akin (1940–2024), Turkish physician
- Bernard Michael Akin of Murroes Castle

Laird of this ancient property

- Bob Akin (1936–2002), American sports commentator, executive, and auto racer
- Dan Akin (born 1998), British basketball player
- Daniel L. Akin (born 1957), American theologian and educator
- David Akin, Canadian journalist
- Edward C. Akin (1852–1936), American politician
- Fatih Akin (born 1973), German-Turkish film director
- Harold Akin (1945–2022), American football player
- Harry Akin (1903–1976), American politician and businessman
- Henry Akin (1944–2020), American basketball player
- Ian Akin (born 1959), American comic artist
- James H. Akin (1832–1911), American Confederate veteran, farmer and politician
- James Akin (c. 1773 – 1846), American political cartoonist
- John Aikin (Unitarian) (1713–1780) English Unitarian scholar and theological tutor
- Jon Akin (born 1977), American soccer player
- Keegan Akin (born 1995), American baseball player
- Len Akin (1916–1987), American National Football League player
- Louis Akin (1868–1913), American painter and illustrator
- Philip Akin (born 1950), Canadian actor
- Susan Akin (born 1965), American beauty pageant titleholder
- Theron Akin (1855–1933), U.S. Representative from New York
- Todd Akin (1947–2021), U.S. Republican politician from Missouri
- Warren Akin Sr. (1811–1877), Confederate politician

== See also ==
- Aiken (surname)
- Aikin
- Akins
