= Aiken (surname) =

Aiken is a Scots-Irish surname, used as a variant to the original Scottish name Aitken. Notable people with it include:

- Alastair Aiken (born 1993), British YouTuber known as Ali-A
- Ann Aiken (born 1951), American judge and attorney
- Blair Aiken (born 1956), American stock car racing driver
- Brady Aiken (born 1996), American baseball player
- C. J. Aiken (born 1990), American basketball player
- Carl Aiken (born 1962), English-born reggae singer known as Shinehead
- Caroline Aiken (born 1955), American musician
- Charles Augustus Aiken (1827–1892), American clergyman and academic
- Charles Avery Aiken (1872–1965), American painter
- Charles Edward Howard Aiken (1850–1936), American ornithologist
- Clay Aiken (born 1978), American singer, actor, activist, and television personality
- Conrad Aiken (1889–1973), American writer
- Danny Aiken (born 1988), American football player
- D. Wyatt Aiken (1828–1887), American army officer and politician
- Edmund Aiken (born 1962), English singer and rapper, known as Shinehead
- Frank Aiken (1898–1983), Irish politician
- Frederick Aiken (1832–1878), American lawyer and journalist
- George Aiken (1892–1984), American politician who served as Governor of Vermont
- Howard H. Aiken (1900–1973), American physicist and computer scientist
- James Aiken (disambiguation)
- Jesse B. Aiken (1808–1900), American musician
- Joan Aiken (1924–2004), British novelist
- John Aiken (1921–2005), British Royal Air Force officer
- John Aiken (1932–2021), American ice hockey player
- John Aiken (born 1950), Irish sculptor
- John Aiken (born 1970), New Zealand cricketer
- John Macdonald Aiken (1880–1961), Scottish painter
- John W. Aiken (1896–1968), American furniture finisher and socialist activist
- Josephine Aiken Mackie Corcoran (1894–1967), American politician from Maryland
- Kamar Aiken (born 1989), American football player
- Kimberly Clarice Aiken (born 1974), American winner of Miss America 1994
- Leona S. Aiken, American psychologist
- Liam Aiken (born 1990), American actor
- Linda Aiken (born 1943), American nursing researcher
- Loretta Mary Aiken (1894–1975), American comedian known as Moms Mabley
- Michael Aiken (1932–2025), American sociologist and academic administrator
- Miles Aiken (born 1941), American basketball player
- Montez Aiken, American politician
- Nickie Aiken (born 1969), British politician
- Sam Aiken (born 1980), American football player
- Simon Aiken (born 1962), English-born South African Anglican priest
- Suzy Clarkson, née Aiken, New Zealand TV personality
- Thomas Aiken (born 1983), South African golfer
- Tommy Aiken (born 1946), Northern Irish footballer
- William Aiken (1779–1831), Irish American politician
- William Aiken Jr. (1806–1887), American politician who served as Governor of South Carolina
- William Martin Aiken (1855–1908), American architect

== See also ==
- Aikens
- Aiken (disambiguation)
- Aitken (surname)
- Aitkens
- Akin (disambiguation)
- Aiken Drum
- Icon the Ungodly
- Iken
