= Aikin =

Aikin is an English surname, and may refer to:

- A. M. Aikin Jr. (1905–1981), American politician
- John Aikin (Unitarian) (1713–1780), English Unitarian scholar and theological tutor, closely associated with Warrington Academy, father of Anna and John
  - Anna Aikin (1743–1825), better known as Anna Laetitia Barbauld, a woman of letters who published in many genres
  - John Aikin (1747–1822), English physician, father of Arthur, Edmund and Lucy
    - Arthur Aikin (1773–1854), English chemist, mineralogist and scientific writer
    - Edmund Aikin (1780–1820), English architect
    - Lucy Aikin (1781–1864), English writer, particularly of history
- Jesse B. Aikin (1808–1900), American musician
- Laura Aikin (born 1964), American soprano
- Scott Aikin (born 1971), American philosopher

== See also ==
- Aickin, surname
- Aikinite, sulfide mineral of lead, copper and bismuth with formula PbCuBiS_{3}
- Aiken (disambiguation)
- Akin (disambiguation)
- Aikins, surname
