= James Adkins =

James Adkins may refer to:

- James Adkins (baseball) (born 1985), American baseball pitcher
- James A. Adkins (born 1954), adjutant general of Maryland
- James C. Adkins (1915–1994), justice for the Florida Supreme Court
- James Edward Adkins (1867–1939), Irish organist and composer
