= Aiken =

Aiken may refer to:

== Places ==
- Aiken County, South Carolina
- Aiken, South Carolina, Aiken County's county seat
- The University of South Carolina Aiken
- Aiken, Texas (disambiguation)
  - Aiken, Bell County, Texas
  - Aiken, Floyd County, Texas
  - Aiken, Shelby County, Texas
- Inman, Kansas, once known as Aiken
- Delta, Utah, originally a railroad switch known as Aiken

== Other uses ==
- Aiken (surname)
- Aiken code, a complementary BCD code
- A file format for storing a database of multiple choice questions, used e.g. in the Moodle learning management system
- The Aiken format lets you create multiple-choice or true-false questions using a simple, human-readable format that you can save as a plain text file and import into a Moodle learning management system course.

Aiken (name) Aiken - Male
