= Aitkin (surname) =

Aitkin is a surname. Notable people with the surname include:

- Alexander Aitkin (1771–1799), mathematician and first surveyor general of Upper Canada
- Don Aitkin (1937–2022), Australian political scientist
- John Aitkin (disambiguation)
- Murray Aitkin, Australian statistician
- Yvonne Aitken (1911–2004), Australian agricultural scientist

== See also ==
- Aitken (surname)
- Atkins (surname)
