= Robert Aitken =

Robert Aitken may refer to:

== Science and medicine ==
- Robert Grant Aitken (1864–1951), American astronomer
- Robert Aitken (dermatologist) (1888–1954) Scottish dermatologist
- Sir Robert Aitken (university administrator) (1901–1997), New Zealand physician and university administrator
- John Aitken (biologist) (Robert John Aitken; born 1947), Australian reproductive biologist

== Others ==
- Robert Aitken (publisher) (1734–1802), American publisher
- Robert Aitken (preacher) (1800–1873), Scottish popular preacher
- Robert P. Aitken (1819–1905), American politician
- Robert Hope Moncrieff Aitken (1826–1887), Scottish army officer and recipient of the Victoria Cross
- Robert Ingersoll Aitken (1878–1949), American sculptor
- Robert Thomas Aitken (1890–1977), American anthropologist
- Robert Aitken (soccer) (1904–1962), American soccer player
- Robert Baker Aitken (1917–2010), American teacher of Zen Buddhism
- Robert Aitken (composer) (born 1939), Canadian flautist and composer
- Roy Aitken (Robert Aitken; born 1958), Scottish footballer
- Robert Campbell Aitken (born 1963), Canadian electrical engineer
- Robert Douglas Aitken (1900–1974), South African medical missionary and botanist
