= John Aitken =

John Aitken may refer to:

- John Aitken (music publisher) (c. 1745–1831), Scottish-American music publisher
- John the Painter or John Aitken (1752–1777)
- John Aitken (surgeon) (died 1790), Scottish surgeon
- John Aitken (editor) (1793–1833), Scottish editor
- John Aitken (meteorologist) (1839–1919)
- John Aitken (politician) (1849–1921), mayor of Wellington, New Zealand
- John Aitken (footballer, born 1870), Scottish footballer
- Johnny Aitken (1885–1918), racing driver
- John Aitken (footballer, born 1894) (c. 1894–1917), Scottish footballer
- Jock Aitken (John Gordon Aitken, 1897-1967), Scottish footballer, see List of Bury F.C. players (25–99 appearances)
- John Aitken (biologist) (born 1947), British-born Australian-based reproductive biologist
- John Aitken (bowls) (born 1954), Scottish lawn bowler

== See also ==
- John Aiken (disambiguation)
- Jonathan Aitken (born 1942), British politician
- John Aitkin (disambiguation)
