= Glenn Aitken =

Glenn Aitken may refer to:

- Glenn Aitken (footballer) (born 1952), English former association football player
- Glenn Aitken (singer) (born 1970), London-based New Zealand singer-songwriter and musician
- Glenn Aitken, mayor of the City of Frankston, Australia (2007–2008)
