= James Akins =

James Akins may refer to:

- James E. Akins (1926–2010), U.S. Ambassador to Saudi Arabia
- James Akins (tubist) (1956–2025), American tubist and music academic
