= Aitken =

Aitken may refer to:

- Aitken (surname), a list of people with the surname
- Aitken (crater), a crater on the Moon
- South Pole–Aitken basin, an impact crater on the far side of the Moon
- Aitken Double Star Catalogue, a star catalogue of double stars
- Aitken Lectureship, awarded by the New Zealand Mathematical Society to a research mathematician from New Zealand
- Aitken's delta-squared process, a mathematical method
- Aitken (supercomputer), a supercomputer located at the Ames Research Center

== See also ==
- Aitkens
- Aitkin (disambiguation)
- Atkin (disambiguation)
- Adkins, a surname
