= EISD =

EISD may refer to:

== School districts ==
- Eanes Independent School District
- Early Independent School District
- Eastland Independent School District
- Ector Independent School District
- Edcouch-Elsa Independent School District
- Edgewood Independent School District (Bexar County, Texas)
- Edgewood Independent School District (Van Zandt County, Texas)
- Edna Independent School District
- Electra Independent School District
- Elgin Independent School District
- Elkhart Independent School District
- Ennis Independent School District
- Era Independent School District
- Etoile Independent School District
- Eula Independent School District
- Eustace Independent School District
- Evadale Independent School District
- Evant Independent School District
- Everman Independent School District
- Excelsior Independent School District
- Ezzell Independent School District

== Other ==
- Ecumenical Institute for Study and Dialogue, Colombo, Sri Lanka
