= Atkinson =

Atkinson may refer to:

== Places ==
- Atkinson, Nova Scotia, Canada
- Atkinson, Dominica, a village in Dominica
- Atkinson, Illinois, U.S.
- Atkinson, Indiana, U.S.
- Atkinson, Maine, U.S.
- Atkinson Lake, a lake in Minnesota, U.S.
- Atkinson, Nebraska, U.S.
- Atkinson, New Hampshire, U.S.
- Atkinson, North Carolina, U.S.

== Other uses ==
- Atkinson (band), rock band from Venezuela
- Atkinson (surname)
- Atkinsons, a department store in Sheffield, England, U.K.
- Atkinsons of London, a British perfume house
- Atkinson Candy Company, Texas Candy company
- Atkinson Clock Tower, clock tower in Kota Kinabalu, Sabah, Malaysia
- Atkinson cycle, asymmetrical thermodynamic cycle
- Atkinson Film-Arts, former Canadian animation studio
- Atkinson Graduate School of Management for the Willamette University MBA program
- Atkinson Hyperlegible, a typeface
- Atkinson resistance, characterizing airflow
- Seddon Atkinson, British truck company

== See also ==
- Atkinson (surname)
- Atkinson Point, Northwest Territories, a community in the Northwest Territories, Canada
- Atkinson Township (disambiguation)
- Fort Atkinson, Wisconsin, U.S.
- Justice Atkinson (disambiguation)
