= Aiken, Texas =

Aiken, Texas may refer to the following communities:

- Aiken, Bell County, Texas
- Aiken, Floyd County, Texas
- Aiken, Shelby County, Texas
