= Eileen McLaughlin =

New Zealander biologist

Eileen Anne McLaughlin
- Education: University of Bristol, University of Glasgow, University of Newcastle (Australia)
- Scientific career
- Fields: Assisted reproduction
- Institutions: University of Newcastle, University of Auckland
- Thesis: The effect of cryopreservation on human spermatozoa (1993)

Eileen Anne McLaughlin is a Scottish molecular biology academic working in Australia. As of 2021 she is a professor at the University of Wollongong.

== Academic career ==
After a 1993 PhD titled 'The effect of cryopreservation on human spermatozoa' at the University of Bristol, McLaughlin moved to Australia for a postdoctoral position at the CSIRO working on virally vectored immunocontraceptives in wildlife feral animal control. McLaughlin was recruited to University of Newcastle in 2002, where she remains an honorary professor. In 2017, McLaughlin became Director of the School of Biological Sciences at University of Auckland. She returned to Australia to serve as Dean of science at the University of Canberra in 2018. Following that appointment, McLaughlin became Dean of science at the University of Western Sydney in 2019. As of September 2021, McLaughlin serves as Executive Dean, science, medicine and health at the University of Wollongong.

Much of McLaughlin's research involves in vitro understanding of the principals of assisted reproduction and the maintenance of gamete quality.

== Selected works ==
- Koppers, Adam J., Geoffry N. De Iuliis, Jane M. Finnie, Eileen A. McLaughlin, and R. John Aitken. "Significance of mitochondrial reactive oxygen species in the generation of oxidative stress in spermatozoa." The Journal of Clinical Endocrinology & Metabolism 93, no. 8 (2008): 3199–3207.
- Wardle, P. G., E. A. McLaughlin, A. McDermott, J. D. Mitchell, B. D. Ray, and M. G. R. Hull. "Endometriosis and ovulatory disorder: reduced fertilisation in vitro compared with tubal and unexplained infertility." The Lancet 326, no. 8449 (1985): 236–239.
- Hutt, K. J., E. A. McLaughlin, and M. K. Holland. "Kit ligand and c-Kit have diverse roles during mammalian oogenesis and folliculogenesis." Molecular Human Reproduction 12, no. 2 (2006): 61–69.
- Asquith, Kelly L., Rosa M. Baleato, Eileen A. McLaughlin, Brett Nixon, and R. John Aitken. "Tyrosine phosphorylation activates surface chaperones facilitating sperm-zona recognition." Journal of Cell Science 117, no. 16 (2004): 3645–3657.
- Telfer, Evelyn E., Roger G. Gosden, Anne Grete Byskov, Norah Spears, David Albertini, Claus Yding Andersen, Richard Anderson et al. "On regenerating the ovary and generating controversy." Cell 122, no. 6 (2005): 821–822.
