= 1985 Winston Western 500 =

Auto race held at Riverside International Raceway in 1985

Race details
- Race 28 of 28 in the 1985 NASCAR Winston Cup Series season
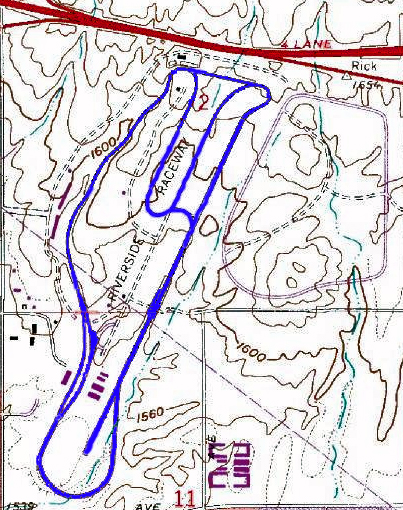
- Layout of Riverside International Raceway (1969-1988 version)
- Date: November 17, 1985
- Official name: Winston Western 500
- Location: Riverside International Raceway, Riverside, California
- Course: Permanent racing facility
- Course length: 2.700 miles (4.345 km)
- Distance: 119 laps, 311.8 mi (501.7 km)
- Weather: Temperatures of 66 °F (19 °C); wind speeds of 12 miles per hour (19 km/h)
- Average speed: 105.065 mph (169.086 km/h)

Pole position
Driver	Terry Labonte	Hagan Enterprises
- Time: 1:20.658

Most laps led
Driver	Terry Labonte	Hagan Enterprises
- Laps: 78

Winner
No. 15	Ricky Rudd	Bud Moore Engineering

Television in the United States
- Network: TBS
- Announcers: Ken Squier; Benny Parsons

The 1985 Winston Western 500 was a NASCAR Winston Cup Series race that took place on November 17, 1985, at Riverside International Raceway in Riverside, California.

With the deletion of the two Nashville races the 1985 Winston Cup season was the first since 1974 with less than 30 races.

== Race report ==
With one race remaining in the championship, Bill Elliott, who won 11 races, trailed Darrell Waltrip by 20 points (between 4-7 positions depending on the order of finish—the equivalent of 4-7 points under the 2011 scoring system). Qualifying was held on Friday and Terry Labonte scored the pole with a time of 1:20.658.

The 500-kilometer race, lasting 119 laps, would have the championship battle come down to the first six laps of the race. The gearshift lever on Elliott's car broke on the sixth lap, necessitating repairs that lasted thirty minutes, or roughly 22 laps of the race and putting him several laps down. Waltrip finished seventh and locked down the championship on Lap 99. On the day his teammate won the title Neil Bonnett ended 1985 on the podium as he led a few laps and brought Junior Johnson's red #12 Budweiser Chevrolet home in third. The 1985 season would be one of career highs for Bonnett as he finished fourth in points on the strength of 11 top-5s and 18 top-10s. This would be the last season where Neil ran every race. This was a combination race with the NASCAR Winston West Series, which had four drivers (Jim Robinson, Hershel McGriff, Glen Steurer, and Ruben Garcia) eligible for the title. Robinson would clinch the title over McGriff with his 12th place finish.

Pit strategy determined the race. On the penultimate pit stop, Labonte's Billy Hagan pit crew changed two tires, while Ricky Rudd's Bud Moore Engineering Ford team changed four tires. On the final round of pit stops, the opposite took place, allowing Rudd to defeat Labonte by almost half a second in front of 40000 spectators. Ruben Garcia, later to gain fame from knocking out a wall in a crash during the last race at Riverside in 1988, scored his career-best finish of 14th place.

Three cautions slowed the race for 11 laps; allowing for 14 lead changes. Bobby Allison came into this race seeking to avoid going winless for the season for the first time since 1977. He qualified well but his chaotic season ended with a 17th-place, two laps down. This was the final race for Rusty Wallace competing for Cliff Stewart Racing.

The race was the final Winston Cup start for Blair Aiken, Clark Dwyer, and John Soares Jr., while Scott Autrey and Bud Hickey would make their only Winston Cup Series appearance at this event. Notable crew chiefs for this race included Junie Donlavey, Robin Pemberton, Joey Arrington, Jake Elder, Travis Carter, Bud Moore, Tim Brewer, Jeff Hammond, Harry Hyde, Kirk Shelmerdine and Darrell Bryant.

=== Qualifying ===
Grid	No.	Driver	Manufacturer	Owner
1	44	Terry Labonte	Chevrolet	Billy Hagan
2	27	Tim Richmond	Pontiac	Raymond Beadle
3	11	Darrell Waltrip	Chevrolet	Junior Johnson
4	15	Ricky Rudd	Ford	Bud Moore
5	9	Bill Elliott	Ford	Harry Melling
6	22	Bobby Allison	Buick	Bobby Allison
7	3	Dale Earnhardt	Chevrolet	Richard Childress
8	33	Harry Gant	Chevrolet	Hal Needham
9	7	Kyle Petty	Ford	Wood Brothers
10	47	Ron Bouchard	Buick	Jack Beebe
11	5	Geoffrey Bodine	Chevrolet	Rick Hendrick
12	75	Lake Speed	Pontiac	RahMoc Enterprises
13	12	Neil Bonnett	Chevrolet	Junior Johnson
14	98	Jim Bown	Chevrolet	Johnny Kieper
15	18	Glen Sturer	Chevrolet	Glen Steurer
16	78	Jim Robinson	Oldsmobile	Lois Williams
17	04	Hershel McGriff	Pontiac	Gary Smith
18	32	Ruben Garcia	Chevrolet	Fred Stoke
19	71	Dave Marcis	Chevrolet	Dave Marcis
20	8	Bobby Hillin Jr.	Chevrolet	Stavola Brothers

== Top 20 finishers ==
Pos	No.	Driver	Manufacturer	Laps	Laps led	Time/Status
1	15	Ricky Rudd	Ford	119	27	2:58:03
2	44	Terry Labonte	Chevrolet	119	78	+0.45 seconds
3	12	Neil Bonnett	Chevrolet	119	3	Led lap under green flag
4	33	Harry Gant	Chevrolet	119	1	Led lap under green flag
5	3	Dale Earnhardt	Chevrolet	119	6	Led lap under green flag
6	5	Geoffrey Bodine	Chevrolet	119	2	Led lap under green flag
7	11	Darrell Waltrip	Chevrolet	119	1	Led lap under green flag
8	43	Richard Petty	Pontiac	119	0	Led lap under green flag
9	75	Lake Speed	Pontiac	118	1	+1 lap
10	47	Ron Bouchard	Buick	118	0	+1 lap
11	11	Glen Steurer	Chevrolet	118	0	+1 lap
12	78	Jim Robinson	Oldsmobile	117	0	+2 laps
13	8	Bobby Hillin Jr.	Chevrolet	117	0	+2 laps
14	32	Ruben Garcia	Chevrolet	117	0	+2 laps
15	73	Bill Schmitt	Chevrolet	117	0	+2 laps
16	98	Jim Bown	Chevrolet	117	0	+2 laps
17	22	Bobby Allison	Buick	117	0	+2 laps
18	71	Dave Marcis	Chevrolet	117	0	+2 laps
19	07	Derrike Cope	Ford	116	0	+3 laps
20	52	Jimmy Means	Pontiac	116	0	+3 laps

== Timeline ==
Section reference:

- Start: Terry Labonte was leading the starting grid as the green flag was waved.
- Lap 10: Darrell Waltrip took over the lead from Terry Labonte.
- Lap 11: Terry Labonte took over the lead from Darrell Waltrip.
- Lap 19: First caution of the event, ended on lap 21.
- Lap 21: Ricky Rudd took over the lead from Terry Labonte.
- Lap 22: Dale Earnhardt took over the lead from Ricky Rudd.
- Lap 26: Terry Labonte took over the lead from Dale Earnhardt.
- Lap 41: Second caution of the event, ended on lap 44.
- Lap 42: Lake Speed took over the lead from Terry Labonte.
- Lap 43: Terry Labonte took over the lead from Lake Speed.
- Lap 48: Third caution of the event, ended on lap 50.
- Lap 71: Harry Gant took over the lead from Terry Labonte.
- Lap 72: Neil Bonnett took over the lead from Harry Gant.
- Lap 75: Ricky Rudd took over the lead from Neil Bonnett.
- Lap 77: Geoffrey Bodine took over the lead from Ricky Rudd.
- Lap 79: Dale Earnhardt took over the lead from Geoffrey Bodine.
- Lap 81: Terry Labonte took over the lead from Dale Earnhardt.
- Lap 96: Ricky Rudd took over the lead from Terry Labonte.
- Lap 116: Greg Sacks' vehicle suddenly developed issues with its transmission.
- Finish: Ricky Rudd was officially declared the winner of the race.

== Standings after the race ==
Pos	Driver	Points	Differential
1	Darrell Waltrip	4292	0
2	Bill Elliott	4191	-101
3	Harry Gant	4028	-264
4	Neil Bonnett	3897	-395
5	Geoffrey Bodine	3862	-430
6	Ricky Rudd	3857	-435
7	Terry Labonte	3683	-609
8 ▲	Dale Earnhardt	3561	-731
9 ▼	Kyle Petty	3532	-769
10	Lake Speed	3507	-785

Preceded by 1985 Atlanta Journal 500	NASCAR Winston Cup Series Season; 1985-6	Succeeded by 1986 Daytona 500
