= John Aiken =

John Aiken may refer to:

- John Macdonald Aiken (1880–1961), Scottish painter
- John Aiken (RAF officer) (1921–2005), British Air Chief Marshal
- John Aiken (ice hockey, born 1932) (1932–2021), American ice hockey player
- John Aiken (basketball), American basketball coach at McNeese State
- John Aiken (cricketer) (born 1970), New Zealand cricketer, psychologist and television personality
- John Aiken (sculptor) (born 1950), Irish sculptor
- John W. Aiken (1896–1968), American furniture finisher and socialist activist

== See also ==
- John Aitken (disambiguation)
- John Aikin (Unitarian) (1713–1780) English Unitarian scholar and theological tutor
