= Alexander Aitken (rugby union) =

Scotland international rugby union player

- Born: Alexander Inglis Aitken; 8 January 1869 Edinburgh, Scotland
- Died: 7 July 1925 (aged 56) Harare, Zimbabwe

Rugby union career
- Position: Forward
Amateur team(s)
Years	Team	Apps	(Points)
-	Edinburgh Institution F.P.		
Provincial / State sides
Years	Team	Apps	(Points)
1888	Edinburgh District		
1889	East of Scotland District		
International career
Years	Team	Apps	(Points)
1889	Scotland	1	(0)

Alexander Aitken (8 January 1869 – 7 July 1925) was a Scotland international rugby union player.

== Rugby Union career ==
=== Amateur career ===
Aitken played club rugby for Edinburgh Institution F.P.

=== Provincial career ===
He played for Edinburgh District against Glasgow District in the 1888 inter-city match.

He played for East of Scotland District in their match against West of Scotland District on 26 January 1889.

=== International career ===
He was capped just the once for Scotland, in 1889. He played in the match against Ireland on 16 February.

== Family ==
His father was Alexander Dunn Aitken (1818–1902) and his mother was Elizabeth Smith McClelland (1832–1915). He was one of their ten children.
