= John Aitkin =

John Aitkin may refer to:

- John the Painter (1752–1777), Scot who committed acts of terror in British naval dockyards in 1776–77
- John Aitkin (surgeon) (fl. 1770–1790), Scottish surgeon

== See also ==
- John Aitken (disambiguation)
