= Aikins =

Aikins is a surname, and may refer to:

- Jack Aikins (born 2002), American swimmer
- James Cox Aikins (1823–1904), Canadian politician, cabinet minister
- James Albert Manning Aikins (1851–1929), Canadian politician in Manitoba
- John Somerset Aikins (1850–1911), financier and politician in Manitoba
- Luke Aikins (born 1973), professional skydiver, BASE jumper, pilot, and aerial photographer
- Matthieu Aikins, a journalist known for reporting on the war in Afghanistan

== See also ==
- Akins
- Aikin
