= Justice Adkins =

Justice Adkins may refer to:

- James C. Adkins (1915–1994), justice of the Supreme Court of Florida
- Sally D. Adkins (born 1950), judge of the Maryland Court of Appeals
- William H. Adkins (1862–1950), judge of the Maryland Court of Appeals
- William H. Adkins II (1925–2003), judge of the Maryland Court of Appeals
