= Aitkin =

Aitkin may refer to:

== Place names ==
In the United States:

- Aitkin County, Minnesota
  - Aitkin, Minnesota, a city in the county
  - Aitkin Township, Aitkin County, Minnesota, a township in the county
  - Aitkin High School, Aitkin, Minnesota

== See also ==
- Aitken (disambiguation), includes "Aitkens"
- Adkins
- Aitkin (surname)
