= Paul McCartney's Glastonbury Groove =

Compilation album by Various Artists
- Released: 12 June 2004
- Recorded: 1958–2003
- Genre: Various
- Length: 67:38
- Label: Uncut
- Producer: Roy Carr; Allan Jones; Lilian Marshall; Paul McCartney
- Compiler: Paul McCartney

Paul McCartney's Glastonbury Groove is a compilation album of some of Paul McCartney's favourite songs. It was released by Uncut in their 2004 issue on McCartney. The album was compiled by Paul himself.

== Track listing ==
1. James Taylor - Mean Old Man (James Taylor)
2. Brian Wilson - God Only Knows [live] (Brian Wilson, Tony Asher)
3. Chinmaya Dunster & Vidroha Jamie - Chance Meeting (Chinmaya Dunster, Vidroha Jamie)
4. Nitin Sawhney - Sunset (Nitin Sawhney)
5. Nat King Cole - The Very Thought of You (Ray Noble)
6. Maria João Pires - Nocturne No. 2 in E Flat Major (Frédéric Chopin)
7. Colin Hay - Going Somewhere (Colin Hay)
8. Paul McCartney - Temporary Secretary [Radioslave mix] (Paul McCartney)
9. Steadman - Carried (Steadman)
10. The Julian Bream Consort - Galliard (Benjamin Britten)
11. George Harrison - Marwa Blues (George Harrison)
12. London Symphony Orchestra - Spiral (Paul McCartney)
13. Glenn Aitken - The Way (Glenn Aitken)
14. Donovan - Sunny Goodge Street (Donovan)
15. Fred Astaire - Cheek to Cheek (Irving Berlin)
16. Frank Sinatra - A Lovely Way to Spend an Evening (Jimmy McHugh, Harold Adamson)
17. Paul McCartney - Calico Skies (Paul McCartney)
