= 1888–89 Scottish Districts season =

Rugby union competition

- Countries: Scotland
- Date: 1888–89
- Matches played: 1

The 1888–89 Scottish Districts season is a record of all the rugby union matches for Scotland's district teams.

It includes the East of Scotland District versus West of Scotland District trial match.

== History ==
North of Scotland District arranged a match with Edinburgh opposition; this time against St. George. However they arrived in Edinburgh with only 14 men. They also planned a match against Glasgow District on 15 December 1888 at the Holburn Ground in Aberdeen.

== Results ==
Date	Try	Conversion	Penalty	Dropped goal	Goal from mark	Notes
1886–1891	1 point	2 points	3 points	3 points	—N/a	Scoring systems after the administration of the game was taken over by the IRFB now known as World Rugby

=== Inter-City ===
1 December 1888

Glasgow District	3 - 0	Edinburgh District
Drop: Fraser	Report

Hamilton Crescent, Glasgow

Glasgow District:
Edinburgh District:

=== Other Scottish matches ===
1 December 1888

Edinburgh St. George	9 - 0	North of Scotland District
Try: Bernards; McIndoe; 3 tries Con: Brown x 2	Report

Drum Park, Edinburgh

Edinburgh St. George:
North of Scotland District:

26 January 1889

East of Scotland District	2 - 0	West of Scotland District
Try: 2 tries	Report; Report

Raeburn Place, Edinburgh
Referee: R. Bruce Young

East:
West:

=== English matches ===
No other District matches played.

=== International matches ===
No touring matches this season.
