= Robert Aitken (dermatologist) =

Scottish physician

Robert Aitken FRSE (1888–1954) was a 20th-century Scottish physician specialising in dermatology and was an expert on lupus vulgaris. He served as president of the Royal Scottish Society of Arts from 1941 to 1944. He was president of the British Association of Dermatologists from 1949 to 1950.

== Life ==
Aitken was born on 6 April 1888 in Edinburgh and was educated at Daniel Stewart's College. He studied medicine at the University of Edinburgh, graduating with an MB ChB in 1911. He then went to work as an assistant to a Dr Crerar in Maryport and before returning to the University to study dermatology under Norman Walker.

In the First World War he served as a physician to the Royal Navy on a hospital ship with the Mediterranean Fleet. During this period he received his doctorate (MD) in 1917. After the war he began working as a dermatologist at Edinburgh Royal Infirmary, where he remained for his entire career. From 1933 he began lecturing in dermatology at the University of Edinburgh. In 1945 he was elected a Fellow of the Royal Society of Edinburgh. His proposers included Douglas Guthrie, Ernest Wedderburn, and William Frederick Harvey.

He retired in July 1953 and died in Edinburgh Royal Infirmary of heart disease on 17 March 1954 following a period of ill-health.

== Publications ==
- Ultra Violet Radiations and Their Uses
- The Problem of Lupus Vulgaris
