= Leon Atkin =

Welsh minister, activist and politician

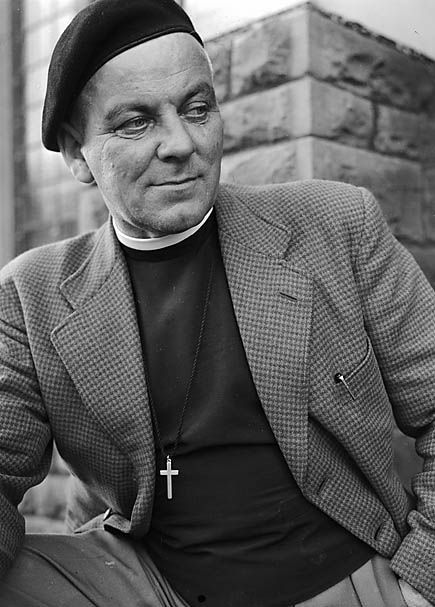
Leon Atkin in 1951

Leon Atkin (1902–1976) was a Welsh Methodist and Congregationalist minister, human rights activist, and politician.

== Early life and education ==
Atkin was born on 26 July 1902 in Spalding, Lincolnshire. His father was a gas manager and his family were Anglicans. He had six siblings. As a boy, he participated in activities at the Methodist chapel that was next door to the family home. In 1914, the family moved to Biddulph. Having become a Methodist, he began preaching as a boy. At 16, he joined the Labour Party. He attended the Handsworth Methodist College, Birmingham.

== Career ==
In 1930, he accepted a position in Risca, Monmouthshire at St John's Church of Probationer Minister. Like Donald Soper, he held open-air meetings on a weekly basis and he drew people to his services, including unbelievers. Atkin embraced the Social Gospel and was an active voice concerning political and social issues affecting the community. He became increasingly involved in social issues two years later when he was moved to Bargoed. At the Methodist Central Hall, he provided a programs to assist unemployed men, including offering free meals, barber and shoe repair services, and lodging, the latter of which circumvented the governmental Means Test of the men's parent's income and angered authorities. He was critical of the church and the Labour Party. Synod leaders then made arrangements for transfer to Cornwall, which Atkin would not accept.

He accepted one of three offers from Congregationalist denominations in Cardiff to lead St Paul's in Swansea. The church was £2,000 in debt and had only 12 members. He began holding open-air ministry meetings, drawing up to 500 people, more so during the summer months. He was not popular within the leadership of the Congregational Union of England and Wales due to his anti-Fascism positions in the Labour Party and reluctance to take direction from church leaders.

He became a representative for Brynmelyn Ward of the Swansea Borough Council in November 1936. He joined the Royal Artillery in 1940, but became an Army Chaplain upon the intervention of the United Chaplains Board. He served in Holland, North Africa, France, and Italy and became a captain.

He was a hero of the poor, and did many great things; He would baptise the children of unmarried mothers, and opened up the church’s crypt during the cold winter of 1946, to let hundreds of people shelter there.

—Ian Bone

Atkin returned to Swansea, where the chapel had been locked and he had lost his ministry. He was able to settle back at St Paul's, without the Congregational Union's formal support, due to the allegiance of members of the community and former soldiers. He formed The People's Party in 1947 to keep his seat on the council, due to complaints he made against the Labour Party. He sat on the council until 1964.

== Personal life ==
He was married with two children. Until World War II, he was a pacifist. While living in Swansea, he visited public houses on Fridays to collect donations for entertainment of poor children. Dylan Thomas was a friend. He died on 27 November 1976 in Swansea.
