= Murray Aitkin =

Australian statistitican

- Education: Sydney University
- Known for: Generalised linear models
- Scientific career
- Fields: Statistics
- Institutions: University of Melbourne

Murray Aitkin is an Australian statistician who specialises in statistical models. He attained his BSc, PhD, and DSc in Sydney University for mathematical statistics in 1961, 1966 and 1997, respectively.

More information coming soon, in the meantime please visit: http://ms.unimelb.edu.au/~maitkin
