= George Aitken =

George Aitken may refer to:

- George Aitken (footballer, born 1925) (1925–2003), Scottish footballer (East Fife, Sunderland and Scotland)
- George Aitken (footballer, born 1928) (1928–2006), Scottish football player (Middlesbrough and Workington) and manager (Workington)
- George Aitken (politician) (1836–1909), merchant and politician in Prince Edward Island, Canada
- George Aitken (rugby union) (1898–1952), rugby union player who represented New Zealand then Scotland
- George Atherton Aitken (1860–1917), British civil servant, author, scholar, and literary biographer
