= Andrew Aitken =

Andrew or Andy Aitken may refer to:

- Andrew Aitken (rugby union) (born 1968), South African international rugby union player
- Andy Aitken (footballer, born 1877) (1877–1955), Scottish footballer for Newcastle United, Middlesbrough, Scotland
- Andy Aitken (footballer, born 1919) (1919–2000), Scottish footballer
- Andy Aitken (footballer, born 1934) (1934–2005), Scottish footballer
- Andy Aitken (footballer, born 1978), Scottish footballer
- Andrew Peebles Aitken (1843–1904), Scottish agricultural chemist
