= John Aitken (footballer, born 1894) =

Scottish footballer (died 1917)

Personal information
- Full name: John A. Aitken
- Date of birth: c. 1894
- Date of death: 13 July 1917 (aged 22–23)
- Place of death: Ypres, Belgium

Senior career*
Years	Team	Apps	(Gls)
- Perth Violet
1913–1915	Hibernian	18	(2)
- Broxburn United
- * Club domestic league appearances and goals

John A. Aitken (c. 1894 – 13 July 1917) was a Scottish professional footballer who played in the Scottish Football League for Hibernian.

== Personal life ==
Aitken served as a lance corporal in the Gordon Highlanders during the First World War. Deployed to the Western Front in February 1915, he was killed in action at Ypres on 13 July 1917. Aitken is buried at Vlamertinge New Military Cemetery.

== Career statistics ==
Appearances and goals by club, season and competition
Club	Season	League			Scottish Cup		Total	
Club	Season	Division	Apps	Goals	Apps	Goals	Apps	Goals
Hibernian	1913–14	Scottish Division One	10	1	0	0	10	1
Hibernian	1914–15	Scottish Division One	8	1	0	0	8	1
Club career total			18	2	0	0	18	2
