= Evelyn Telfer =

British reproductive biologist

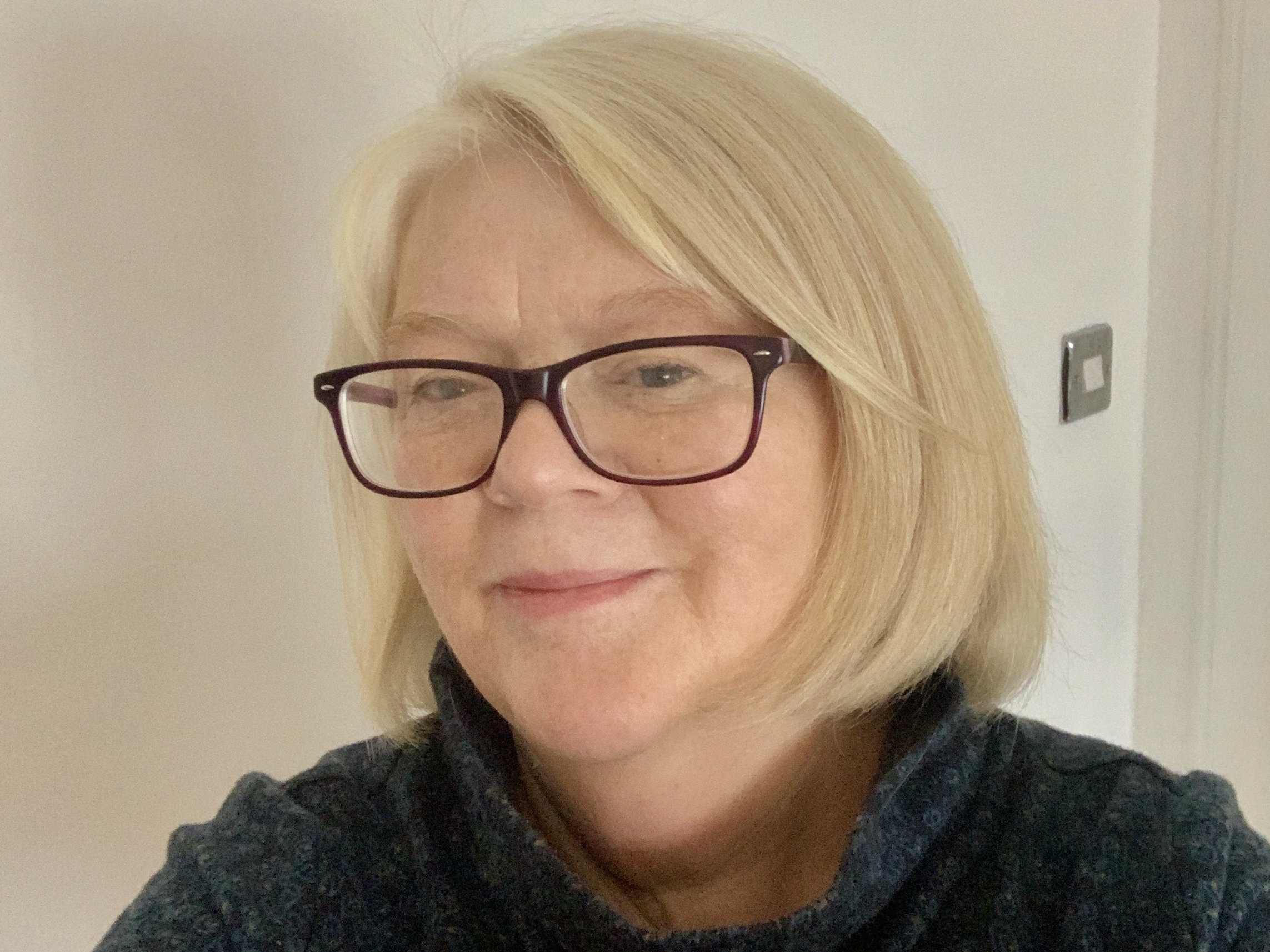
Professor Evelyn E Telfer CBE FRSE FRSB

Evelyn Elizabeth Telfer CBE is a reproductive biologist and professor at the University of Edinburgh. She leads a research team which has successfully grown immature human eggs to maturity in the lab, and discovered that human ovaries are capable of growing new eggs. In 2018, she was named one of Porter magazine's Incredible Women of 2018. In January 2019, she delivered the Anne McLaren Memorial Lecture at the Joint Fertility Societies Meeting in Birmingham: Fertility 2019. The Society of Reproduction and Fertility (SRF) presented her with their Distinguished Scientist award. Professor Telfer was presented with the Marshall Medal by SRF at Fertility 2023 in Belfast in recognition of her world leading contributions to the field of ovarian function and fertility preservation. The Marshall Medal is the Society's premier award established in 1963 to commemorate the life and work of the eminent physiologist FHA Marshall. She was elected as a fellow of the Royal Society of Edinburgh (FRSE) in 2025.

== Early life ==
Evelyn originates from Hurlford and was educated at Saint Joseph's Academy, Kilmarnock. She obtained a First class honours degree (BSc Hons) in Biology and Biometrics from Paisley College of Technology (now the University of the West of Scotland). At PCT, she was named the most distinguished student of the school of science in her graduating year. Following her first degree, she joined the University of Edinburgh to study for a PhD in ovarian development under the supervision of Professor Roger Gosden in the department of Physiology. She obtained her PhD from the University of Edinburgh in 1987. Her thesis investigated factors influencing the development of ovarian follicles in mammals.

== Career ==
Telfer is currently a reproductive biologist and Professor of Reproductive Biology at the University of Edinburgh.

She is a former Associate Editor of Molecular Human Reproduction journal. and a current Associate Editor for the Journal of Assisted Reproduction and Genetics.

From 1987-1989, Telfer worked in the Department of Physiology at the University of Edinburgh. Here, she worked with the physiologist Roger Gosden to develop a culture system to support murine follicle development, one of the first of its kind.

From 1989-1992, Telfer was a postdoctoral fellow in John Eppig's Laboratory at the Jackson Labs in Bar Harbor Maine working on in vitro growth systems and oocyte secreted factors. She was the recipient of a Rockefeller Foundation award.

She returned to the University of Edinburgh in 1992 as a lecturer and established a research group working on ovarian development.

She led research which, in 2016, found evidence that the human ovary may have the capability to grow new eggs in adulthood. However, Telfer warned against premature clinical applications in fertility treatments before the findings have been fully understood. Telfer has established collaborations with clinicians working on ovarian tissue cryopreservation and transplantation for fertility preservation and was part of the team that reported the first pregnancy in the U.K. following ovarian transplantation.

In 2018, she was named as one of Porter magazine's Incredible Women of 2018, recognised for her research growing oocyte cells to maturity in the lab, to the point at which they can be fertilised. The research was the first successful attempt to grow fully mature human eggs, where previously it had only been achieved for mouse eggs. The technique has implications for fertility treatment, in particular in women undergoing in vitro fertilisation and women who had their ovaries removed before cancer treatment. Telfer was the project leader, and co-authored an article publishing the research in the medical journal Molecular Human Reproduction in March 2018.

Telfer was appointed Commander of the Order of the British Empire (CBE) in the 2021 Birthday Honours for services to female reproductive biology.
