= Wendy Atkin =

Professor and epidemiologist

Wendy Atkin OBE FMedSci
- Born: Wendy Sheila Green; 5 April 1947; London, England
- Died: 2 October 2018 (aged 71)
- Education: University of London (BPharm); Columbia University (MPH); University College London (PhD)
- Awards: Bengt Ihre Medal (2012)
- Scientific career
- Fields: Epidemiology
- Workplaces: St Mary's Hospital, London; Imperial College London
- Thesis: Risk of subsequent colon and rectal cancer after removal of adenomas from the rectosigmoid (1991)
- Website: imperial.ac.uk/people/w.atkin

Wendy Sheila Atkin OBE FMedSci (née Green; 5 April 1947 – 2 October 2018) was Professor of Gastrointestinal Epidemiology at Imperial College London.

== Early life and education ==
Atkin was born in London on 5 April 1947 to Gella (née Binder) and David Green. She studied pharmacy at the University of London gaining a bachelor's degree in 1968. She studied public health at Columbia University, which she graduated in 1985 with a Master of Public Health (MPH) degree in 1984. She joined University College London for her graduate studies, where she researched the long-term risk of colorectal cancer following the removal of adenomas and was awarded a PhD in 1991.

== Career and research ==
Atkin joined the Colorectal Cancer Unit at Cancer Research UK in St Mark's Hospital, and was made deputy director in 1997. She was made a senior lecturer at Imperial College London in 1997, reader in 2000 and professor in 2004.

From 1994 she worked with Jane Wardle on a trial of flexible sigmoidoscopy that included endoscopic examination of the colon, reporting that 40% of colorectal cancers could be prevented by this intervention. She compared the screening to a Faecal occult blood (FOB) test. In 2008 she moved to St Mary's Hospital, London, where she established the Cancer Screening and Prevention Research Group. The group researches bowel cancer and, ultimately, aims to reduce the number of people who die from the disease. Their 2010 paper outlining the results of the UK Flexible Sigmoidoscopy Screening Trial was the most frequently cited paper in The Lancet that year. The landmark study was a randomised controlled trial of almost 400,000 adults across 14 areas in the UK. If there were any polyps, people were referred for a colonoscopy. The strategy was rolled out by the UK National Screening Committee in 2011 and was expected to achieved complete population coverage in 2016. This was achieved with a £60 million investment from the UK government. It's estimated to prevent 5,000 cancer diagnoses and 3,000 deaths a year. They found an increased risk in bowel polyps from eating red meat. They examined the incidence and mortality for the following 17 years, finding that people involved in the screening had a 41% lower mortality. The bowel cancer screening test BowelScope can prevent 35% of bowel cancers.

Atkin went on to create a Special Interest Group (SIG) on Gastrointestinal and Abdominal Radiologists 1 (SIGGAR1), which analysed the effectiveness of virtual colonoscopy. They found it was less invasive and more effective at finding precancerous polyps and bowel cancer. She researched the optimum timing of surveillance strategies for people who were at high risk of bowel cancer. Atkin established a patient-friendly process that would invite, screen and follow-up the whole population. She found that patients at risk of developing bowel cancer benefitted significantly from a follow-up colonoscopy.

She served as an expert advisor for the National Institute for Health and Care Excellence (NICE) Guidelines for Colonoscopic Surveillance. She served on several advisory committees and boards. She retired from Imperial College London in August 2018 and was made Emeritus Professor. She died on 2 October 2018.

=== Awards and honours ===
- 2015 Elected a Fellow of the Academy of Medical Sciences (FMedSci)
- 2013 Appointed Order of the British Empire (OBE) for services to Bowel Cancer Prevention in the 2013 Birthday Honours.
- 2012 Awarded the Bengt Ihre Medal by the Swedish Society of Medicine
- 2011 Awarded the President's Medal by the British Society of Gastroenterologists
