= James H. Akin =

American politician

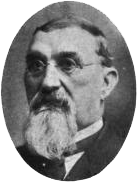
- Born: James Houston Akin; August 12, 1832; Maury County, Tennessee
- Died: January 21, 1911 (aged 78); Williamson County, Tennessee
- Occupations: Farmer, politician
- Political party: Democratic
- Spouses: Marinda Cecil; Sophia Burnett Kernan; Lena Oden
- Children: 6
- Parent(s): Samuel W. Akin; Millie Biffle

Major James H. Akin (August 12, 1832 – January 21, 1911) was an American Confederate veteran, farmer and politician. He served as a Democratic member of the Tennessee House of Representatives in 1899, representing Williamson County, Tennessee.

== Early life ==
Akin was born on August 12, 1832, near Hampshire in Maury County, Tennessee. His father was Samuel W. Akin while his mother was Millie Biffle. He had eight siblings, and he grew up on a farm.

His paternal great-grandfather, William Akin was born in Scotland and immigrated to South Carolina. His paternal grandfather, Reverend John Akin, who was a Methodist minister, served in the American Revolutionary War of 1775–1783 and settled in Maury County in 1808; he emancipated his slaves upon his death in 1821. His maternal grandfather, Jacob Biffle, also served in the American Revolutionary War.

== Career ==
Akin became a farmer and stock raiser in Maury County in 1847. During the American Civil War of 1861–1865, he joined the Confederate States Army and served as the captain of Company E of the 9th Battalion Tennessee Cavalry. He was stationed at Fort Donelson. In 1862, he was promoted to the rank of major. After the war, he returned to farming in Maury County until 1881. From 1882 onward, he became a farmer in Williamson County, where he owned a 420-acre farm.

Akin was a member of the Democratic Party. He served as the tax collector of Maury County from 1870 to 1872. He then served as justice of the peace in Williamson County from 1882 to 1890. He served as a floterial representative for Maury and Williamson counties in 1890 and 1891, as well as Maury, Williamson, Giles and Lewis counties in the Tennessee House of Representatives in 1895. He served as a proper member of the state house from 1899 to 1901, representing Williamson County.

== Personal life and death ==
Akin was married three times. He married his first wife, Marinda Cecil, in 1859; they had three children, but only one daughter, Bettie Jones, survived to adulthood; she died in 1867. He married his second wife, Sophia Burnett Kernan, 1881; they had a son, Andrew Kernan, and two daughters, Ethel Johnson and Jimmie Hatton; she died in 1893. He married his third wife, Lena Oden, in 1900. He was a member of the Methodist Episcopal Church, South, and a Freemason.

Akin died on January 21, 1911, at his home near Thompson's Station in Williamson County. He was interred at Mount Hope Cemetery in Franklin, Tennessee.
