= Pete Adkins =

American football coach)

Biographical details
- Born: September 9, 1924 (age 102); Wellsville, Missouri, U.S.

Coaching career (HC unless noted)
- 1951–1957: Centralia HS (MO)
- 1958-1993: Jefferson City HS (MO)

Head coaching record
- Overall: 392-60-4; 405-60-4

Accomplishments and honors

Awards
- Missouri Sports Hall of Fame (1986, 2013 Legend)

John V. "Pete" Adkins (born September 9, 1924, in Wellsville, Missouri) is a retired American football coach. Adkins served in the U.S. Navy during World War II, between 1943 and 1946. In 2024, Adkins celebrated his 100th birthday in Jefferson City, Missouri, stating that he still exercises and lifts weights five days a week.
