= Excelsior Independent School District =

School district in Texas

Excelsior Independent School District is a public school district located in Aiken, Texas (But the School has a Center Address).

Excelsior ISD has one school that serves students in pre-kindergarten though twelfth grade.

In 2009, the school district was rated "recognized" by the Texas Education Agency.
