= Pauline Aitken =

British artist (1893–1958)

- Born: 30 June 1893; Accrington, England
- Died: 1958 (aged 64–65); Surrey, England
- Education: Manchester School of Art; Chelsea Polytechnic; Royal Academy Schools
- Known for: Painting and sculpture

Pauline Aitken (30 June 1893 –1958) was a British artist and sculptor.

== Biography ==
Aitken was born in Accrington in Lancashire where her father was the town clerk and a solicitor for the Corporation of Accrington. Aitken attended the Manchester School of Art and continued her studies at Chelsea Polytechnic and the Royal Academy Schools in London before establishing a studio in Upper Cheyne Row in Chelsea. From 1925 to 1929 she exhibited a series of bronze statuettes representing women in movement, for example the pieces Dance and Bacchante, at the Salon des Artistes Francais in Paris. She also exhibited at the Royal Academy in London between 1918 and 1932, at the Royal Scottish Academy and with the Society of Women Artists.
