= Samuel Aitken =

Scottish footballer

Sam Aitken
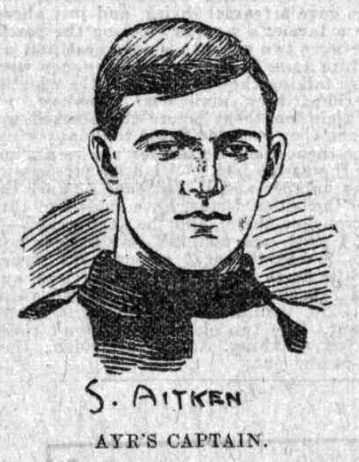
- 1902 sketch from Dundee Evening Post

Personal information
- Full name: Samuel Aitken
- Date of birth: 19 May 1878
- Place of birth: Ayr, Ayrshire, Scotland
- Date of death: 7 March 1930 (aged 51)
- Place of death: Ayr, Ayrshire, Scotland
- Position: Defender

Senior career*
Years	Team	Apps	(Gls)
1897–1903	Ayr	99	(18)
1903–1910	Middlesbrough	227	(6)
1910–1912	Raith Rovers	62	(2)
1912–1913	Ayr United	24	(1)
- * Club domestic league appearances and goals

Samuel Aitken (19 May 1878 – 7 March 1930) was a Scottish footballer who played in the English Football League for Ayr and Middlesbrough before the First World War.

Aitken was born in Ayr, the son of John Aitken, a carter, and Jessie Mitchell Aitken.

Aitken served as captain for the Ayr team through 1903, and was described by the Dundee Evening Telegraph in 1902, "Sam Aitken at centre half-back is of the Anderson, Kilmarnock, type, here, there, and everywhere following up the ball, never seeming to be content unless in close touch with operations."

Aitken transferred to Middlesbrough in mid-1903, but eventually returned to Ayr in 1912. By then into his early 30s, he was still in top form, as was noted by an English newspaper: "Sam Aitken, late of Middlesbrough and Raith Rovers, is playing a great game at centre-half for Ayr United in his native town. He is still fit for First League football, and Raith Rovers have not an abler defender than their old captain." However, he was released from Ayr in 1913. In September 1913, the Dundee Courier bemoaned, "Whatever were Ayr United thinking about when they let Sam Aitken go? His shoes have not been filled."

Aitken then fought in the First World War, serving with the King's Own Scottish Borderers. His eyesight declined and he was nearly completely blind by May 1924, when the Scottish Football Association council voted to give him £10 in aid (equivalent to £1,000 in 2025). His blindness may have been caused by a war injury, as in early 1925, he was admitted to St Dunstan's nursing home, then at Winfield House in Regent's Park. He died five years later. At the first Ayr F.C. match after his death, the players wore black arm bands and the flag at Somerset Park flew at half-mast in his honour.
