= Claus Yding Andersen =

Danish reproductive physiologist

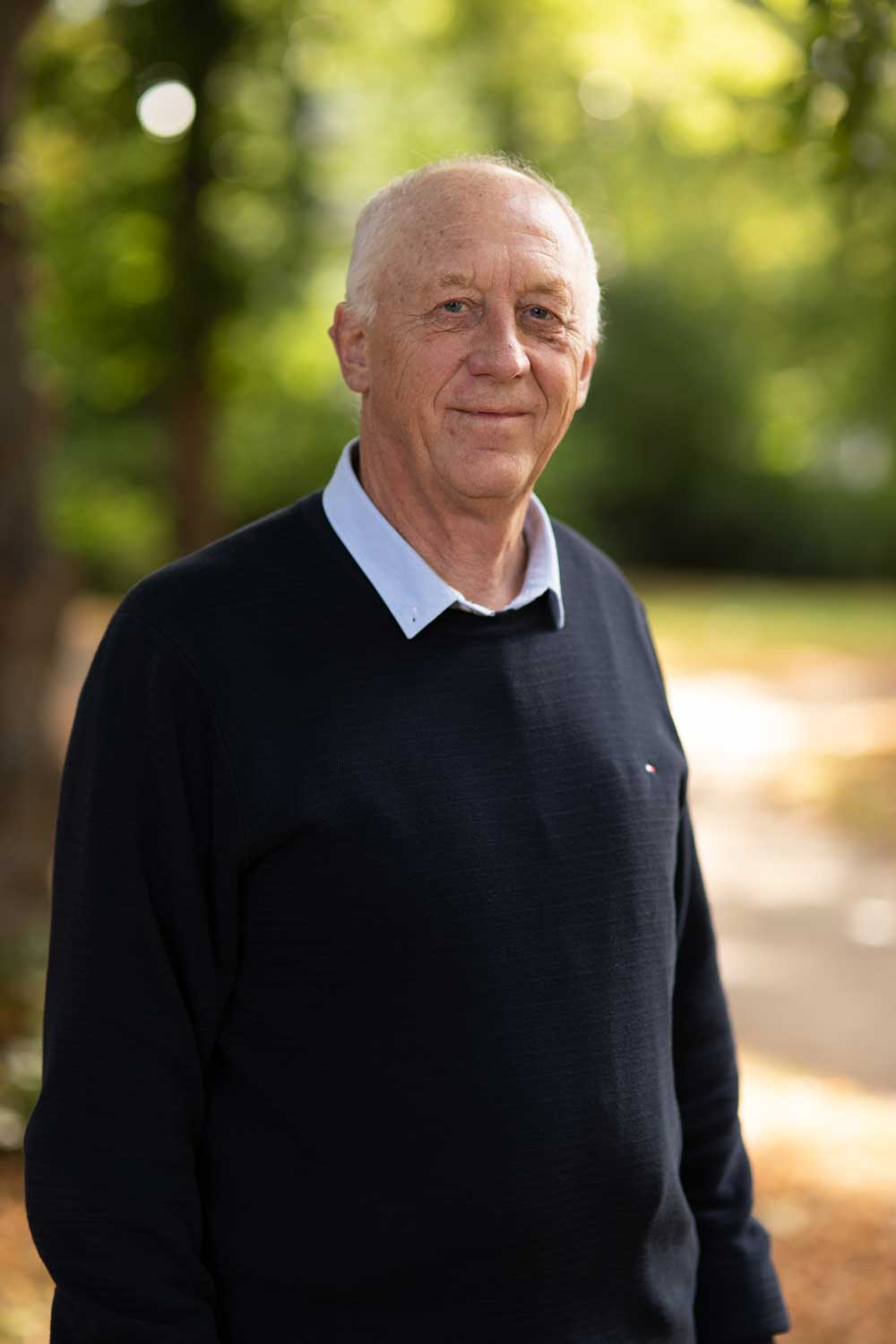
- Born: 31 July 1955 (age 70); Aarhus, Denmark
- Citizenship: Danish
- Education: MSc, Technical University of Denmark; DMSc, University of Copenhagen
- Known for: Fertility preservation; Ovarian tissue cryopreservation; Ovarian and testicular tissue transplantation
- Awards: Carl Gemzell Lectorate (2010)
- Scientific career
- Fields: Reproductive physiology Human fertility Ovarian biology
- Institutions: University of Copenhagen; Copenhagen University Hospital (Rigshospitalet); Herlev University Hospital

Claus Yding Andersen (born 31 July 1955) is a Danish reproductive physiologist and academic specializing in human fertility, ovarian biology, and fertility preservation. He is Professor Emeritus of Human Reproductive Physiology at the Faculty of Health and Medical Sciences, University of Copenhagen, and a senior researcher at Herlev University Hospital (Copenhagen University Hospital). Andersen is regarded as a leading contributor to the development of fertility preservation techniques, particularly the cryopreservation of ovarian and testicular tissue.

== Early life and education ==
Andersen was born in Aarhus, Denmark. He completed a Master of Science degree in engineering at the Technical University of Denmark in 1979. He later earned a Doctor of Medical Science (DMSc) degree from the University of Copenhagen in 1997, with a focus on human reproductive physiology.

== Academic and clinical career ==
Andersen has spent most of his career at Copenhagen University Hospital (Rigshospitalet), where he joined the Laboratory of Reproductive Biology in 1979 and became a senior researcher in 1986. From 2008 to 2023, he served as director of the laboratory, overseeing both research and clinical translation in reproductive medicine.

In 2009, he was appointed professor of human reproductive physiology at the Faculty of Health and Medical Sciences, University of Copenhagen. He was one of only two clinical professors in Denmark without a medical degree (MD). He held this position until 2023, when he became professor emeritus. Since 2023, he has continued his research activities as a senior researcher at both the Fertility Clinic and the Department of Urology at Herlev University Hospital.

Earlier in his career, Andersen served as acting chief and IVF Laboratory Director at Rigshospitalet (1990–1994) and has worked as an IVF consultant at multiple fertility clinics in Denmark and abroad from 1989 onward. He undertook a sabbatical year in New Zealand in 1997–1998. He has also held visiting and honorary professorships, including appointments at Aarhus University and the Second Military Medical University in Shanghai.

== Research ==
Andersen’s research focuses on human ovarian physiology and the translation of basic reproductive science into clinical applications for fertility preservation and restoration. His work spans molecular endocrinology, follicular dynamics, assisted reproductive technologies (ART), and fertility preservation protocols.

He has published approximately 495 scientific papers, including more than 435 peer-reviewed articles. His work has appeared in journals such as Nature, Science, The Lancet, Cell, Nature Cell Biology, Human Reproduction Update, BMJ, and European Urology. According to Google Scholar, his publications have received more than 33,000 citations, with an h-index of 99. He has delivered more than 700 scientific presentations in over 55 countries and is a frequent invited speaker at international conferences.

A central theme of Andersen’s scientific contributions is the cryopreservation and transplantation of ovarian and testicular tissue. He was among the first researchers to advocate and refine ovarian tissue cryopreservation for fertility preservation in girls and young women undergoing gonadotoxic cancer therapies. His research demonstrated that cryopreserved ovarian cortex can restore endocrine function, support follicular growth, and result in successful pregnancies following autotransplantation, including documented live births after orthotopic transplantation.

In cohort studies that he led or co-authored, retrospective analyses of large Danish fertility preservation programs examined how age at tissue cryopreservation, diagnosis, and follow-up duration influence transplantation rates and fertility outcomes. These studies, based on data from more than 1,000 patients, have contributed to international reporting standards and benchmarking for fertility preservation programs.

Andersen has also contributed to research on the oncological safety of ovarian tissue transplantation, including studies addressing the risk of malignant cell reintroduction and strategies to mitigate these risks in survivors of pediatric cancers.

In addition, he was among the first to emphasize the use of ovarian tissue cryopreservation to preserve and extend endocrine function in women. He has made significant contributions to understanding the mechanisms regulating human oocyte maturation and follicular development.

Beyond tissue preservation, Andersen’s work includes investigations into oocyte quality, maturation, and in vitro development. His research on the use of immature oocytes retrieved during ovarian tissue cryopreservation has influenced broader ART practices and expanded fertility treatment options.

== Honors and awards ==
- Carl Gemzell Lectorate (2010), one of Denmark’s most prestigious scientific lectureships in reproductive medicine
- Honorary Visiting Expert, Singapore Ministry of Health (2007)
- Specialty Chief Editor, Reproduction Section, Frontiers in Endocrinology
- In 2017, his laboratory marked the cryopreservation of the 1,000th human ovary for fertility preservation, reflecting long-term clinical implementation of his research

== Selected publications ==
- Byskov AG; Yding Andersen C; Nordholm L; Thøgersen H; Guoliang X; Wassmann O; Andersen JV; Roed T (1995). "Chemical structure of novel meiosis-activating steroids crucial to reproduction". Nature. 374: 559–562.
- Andersen, C. Y., Rosendahl, M., Byskov, A. G., et al. “Two successful pregnancies following autotransplantation of frozen/thawed ovarian tissue.” Human Reproduction, 2008;23:(10):2266–2272.
- Yding Andersen C; Byskov AG (2006). "Is oestradiol an important regulator for secretion of anti-Müllerian hormone, inhibin-A and inhibin-B?". Journal of Clinical Endocrinology & Metabolism. 91: 4064–4069.
- Rosendahl M; Schmidt KT; Ernst E; et al. (2011). "Cryopreservation of ovarian tissue for a decade in Denmark: a view of the technique". Reproductive Biomedicine Online. 22 (2): 162–171.
- Mamsen LS; Ernst EH; Borup R; et al. (2017). "Temporal expression pattern of genes during sex differentiation in human embryonic gonads". Scientific Reports. 7: 15961.
- Andersen CY; Kelsey T; Mamsen LS; Vuong LN (2020). "Shortcomings of an unphysiological triggering of oocyte maturation using human chorionic gonadotropin". Fertility and Sterility. 114: 200–208.
- Cadenas J; Adrados CS; Kumar A; et al. (2025). "Regulating human oocyte maturation in vitro". Journal of Assisted Reproduction and Genetics. 42 (5): 1461–1472.
- Matthews SJ; Picton HM; Ernst E; Andersen CY (2018). "Successful pregnancy following transplantation of ovarian tissue cryopreserved before puberty". Minerva Ginecologica. 70: 432–435.
- Andersen CY (2025). "Integrating impact of FSH isoforms, androgens and inhibin-B on follicular development". Reproductive Biology and Endocrinology. 23 (1): 130.
- Mamsen LS; Charkiewicz K; Anderson RA; et al. (2019). "Characterization of follicles in girls and young women with Turner syndrome". Fertility and Sterility. 111: 1217–1225.
