= Tommy Aiken =

Northern Irish footballer

Personal information
- Full name: Thomas Aiken
- Date of birth: 18 March 1946 (age 80)
- Place of birth: Ballymena, Northern Ireland
- Position: Outside right

Senior career*
Years	Team	Apps	(Gls)
1965–1967	Ballymena United		
1967–1969	Doncaster Rovers	13	(1)
- Chelmsford City

International career
1965	Northern Ireland Amateurs	1	(0)
- * Club domestic league appearances and goals

Thomas Aiken (born 18 March 1946) is a Northern Irish retired footballer who played as an outside right. He played in the Football League for Doncaster Rovers.
