= William Aitken =

William Aitken or Bill Aitken may refer to:

- William Aitken (architect) (1889–1961), Scottish-American architect
- William Aitken (politician) (1903–1964), journalist and politician
- William Alexander Aitken (1785–1851), fur trader with the Ojibwe
- William Aubrey Aitken (1911–1985), second Bishop of Lynn, 1972–1986
- William Aitken (pathologist) (1825–1892), Scottish pathologist
- Bill Aitken (politician) (born 1947), Scottish politician
- Bill Aitken (writer) (1934–2025), Scottish-born writer and traveller, long a citizen and resident of India
- Billy Aitken (footballer) (1894–1973), Scottish football player

== See also ==
- Will Aitken, American-Canadian novelist, journalist and film critic
