= Akin =

pronunciation

Akin may refer to:

== People ==
- Akin (given name), a list of people
- Akin (surname), a list of people
- Akın, a list of people with the Turkish given name or surname

== Places ==
- Akin Island, Antarctica
- Akin, Aksaray, a village in Aksaray Province, Turkey
- Akin, Illinois, a town in the United States
- Akin, Şereflikoçhisar, a village in Ankara Province, Turkey

== Other uses ==
- Akin (band), an Australian band
- aKin (restaurant), Chinese restaurant in Toronto, Canada

== See also ==
- Akins
