= Scott Aikin =

American philosopher (born 1971)

- Born: 1971 (age 54–55)

Philosophical work
- Era: Contemporary philosophy
- Region: Western philosophy
- School: Analytic philosophy
- Main interests: Epistemology; argumentation theory; ancient philosophy; pragmatism

Scott F. Aikin (born 1971) is an American philosopher and associate professor of philosophy at Vanderbilt University in Nashville, Tennessee, where he also holds a joint appointment in Classics. He earned an M.A. in philosophy from the University of Montana in 1999 and a Ph.D. in philosophy from Vanderbilt University in 2006. His principal areas of research are epistemology, argumentation theory, ancient philosophy, and pragmatism.

== Research ==
=== Epistemology ===
Aikin's work in epistemology is devoted to the elaboration and defense of two views: evidentialism and epistemic infinitism. His case for evidentialism is articulated in his Evidentialism and the Will to Believe, in which he defends William Kingdon Clifford's version of evidentialism against William James's critiques. Clifford holds in "The Ethics of Belief" that "It is wrong always, everywhere, and for anyone, to believe anything upon insufficient evidence." James denies this, claiming that cases of faith – particularly those in which belief in a truth can help bring about the truth – are exceptional. Replying on behalf of Clifford, Aikin argues that such cases are not exceptions, because knowledge that one's belief in a proposition makes that proposition more likely to be true amounts to evidence for that proposition. Aikin has also contributed to the public debate about the ethics of belief in religious contexts, in Reasonable Atheism. Aikin's case for epistemic infinitism, developed in Epistemology and the Regress Problem, holds that given the requirement that all reasons must have backing, the only options for rational belief are either skepticism or infinite, non-repeating chains of justifying reasons. In "Prospects for Moral Epistemic Infinitism," Aikin argues that these are also requirements of moral knowledge.

=== Argumentation theory ===
Aikin is a proponent of the epistemic theory of argument, according to which the primary norms of argumentation are those that promote the communication of knowledge. His central argument for this view is that it uniquely precludes an absurdity that arises on the alternatives. Namely, the possibility that one may be convinced by an argument, yet know no more after the argument than before. Aikin further argues that the main competitor theories of argument are either self-refuting or implicitly epistemic. His work in theory of argument has led Aikin to develop a program of expansive fallacy theory. Aikin poses an analysis of ad hominem tu quoque arguments that establishes the conditions for determining relevance of hypocrisy. He has (with Robert Talisse and John Casey) proposed a variety of straw man fallacies: the representational (straw) man, the selectional (weak) man, the hollow man, and the iron man. Additionally, Aikin and Talisse have proposed a fallacy of ridicule they term "modus tonens," which consists in repeating an interlocutor's claim with an incredulous tone of voice. Finally, Aikin also defends, along with Trudy Govier, the minimally adversarial theory of argument. This view acknowledges that, argumentation, as an act of addressing controversy, must have an essential adversarial component, but maintains that this adversariality must not be permitted to escalate. Aikin, in Why We Argue, offers an introduction to argumentation theory for the context of public political debate. As an author, he has been collected by libraries worldwide.

=== Ancient philosophy ===
Aikin's work in ancient philosophy focuses primarily on knowledge and its connection to the good life in the ancient world. Of particular interest are Xenophanes, the Academic Skeptics, and the Stoics. With Xenophanes, Aikin argues that the famous contrary to fact conditional "if horses had had hands and drew their gods, they would look like horses" is an enthymatic argument against self-serving representations of the divine. Aikin's work on the skeptics has focused on the variety of arguments offered for the skeptical viewpoint. In particular, Aikin has argued that the Academics' "Argument from Second Place" is a unique positive epistemic argument for skepticism. Further, Academic epistemology, Aikin has argued, is well-placed to dovetail with republican political views.

=== Pragmatism ===
Aikin is a proponent of the neo-pragmatist movement in American philosophy. This movement is posited on the view that there is a fecund interplay between the methods and language of analytic philosophy, and the aspirations of pragmatism. In Pragmatism: A Guide for the Perplexed, Aikin and Talisse argue that the insights of classical pragmatism can be seen to merge with the analytic program, which gives rise to a number of important research agendas – particularly in epistemology, metaphysics, ethics, and political philosophy. Along with Talisse, Aikin has argued that pragmatism and moral pluralism are in tension, and hence that pragmatists cannot be pluralists.

== Bibliography (authored books) ==
- Epistemology and the Regress Problem,(Routledge, 2011)
- Evidentialism and the Will to Believe, (Bloomsbury, 2014)
- Why We Argue (And How We Should) : a guide to political disagreement, with Robert Talisse, (Routledge, 2014)
- Reasonable Atheism, with Robert Talisse, (Prometheus Books, 2011)
- Pragmatism: A Guide for the Perplexed, with Robert Talisse, (Continuum Books, 2008) According to WorldCat, the book is in 1098 libraries
- Pragmatism, Pluralism, and the Nature of Philosophy, (Routledge, 2017)
