= Aikens =

Aikens is a Scots-Irish surname, used as a variant to the original Scottish name Aitken. People with this name include:

- Asa Aikens (1788–1863) American attorney, politician, and judge
- Amanda L. Aikens (1833–1892), American editor and philanthropist
- Andrew J. Aikens (1828–1909), American newspaper publisher
- Carl Aikens Jr. (born 1962), American footballer
- Delaney Aikens (born 2000), Canadian rugby sevens player
- Diane Geppi-Aikens (1962–2003), lacrosse coach
- Johnnie S. Aikens (1914–1986), American politician
- Richard Aikens (born 1948), British judge
- Tom Aikens (1900–1985), Australian politician
- Tom Aikens (born 1970), English chef
- Vanoye Aikens (1922–2013), American dancer and actor
- Walt Aikens (born 1991), American football player
- Willie Aikens (born 1954), American baseball player

== See also ==
- Aiken (surname)
