= Jerry Atkin =

American businessman

Jerry C. Atkin (born February 27, 1949) is the chairman of SkyWest, Inc., which operates SkyWest Airlines and (until January 2019) ExpressJet Airlines. He helped consolidate the merger between ASA and SkyWest.

Atkin joined the company in July 1974 as a member of the Board of Directors and the company's Director of Finance. He became the President and Chief Executive Officer the next year. He is on the Utah State Board of Regents. He was once regarded as "longest-tenured CEO in airline industry" for Skywest before stepping down in 2016 for Chip Childs to succeed on January 1, 2017.

He and his wife Carolyn have four children. His son Ryan Atkin once worked for Oppenheimer in New York City.
