= Justice Atkinson =

Justice Atkinson may refer to:

- Samuel C. Atkinson (1864–1942), associate justice of the Supreme Court of Georgia
- Spencer Atkinson (judge) (1851–1920), associate justice of the Supreme Court of Georgia
- William D. Atkinson (1861–1945), associate justice of the Kansas Supreme Court
- William King Atkinson (1765–1820), associate justice of the New Hampshire Supreme Court
- William Yates Atkinson Jr. (1887–1953), associate justice of the Supreme Court of Georgia
