= Louis Akin =

American painter

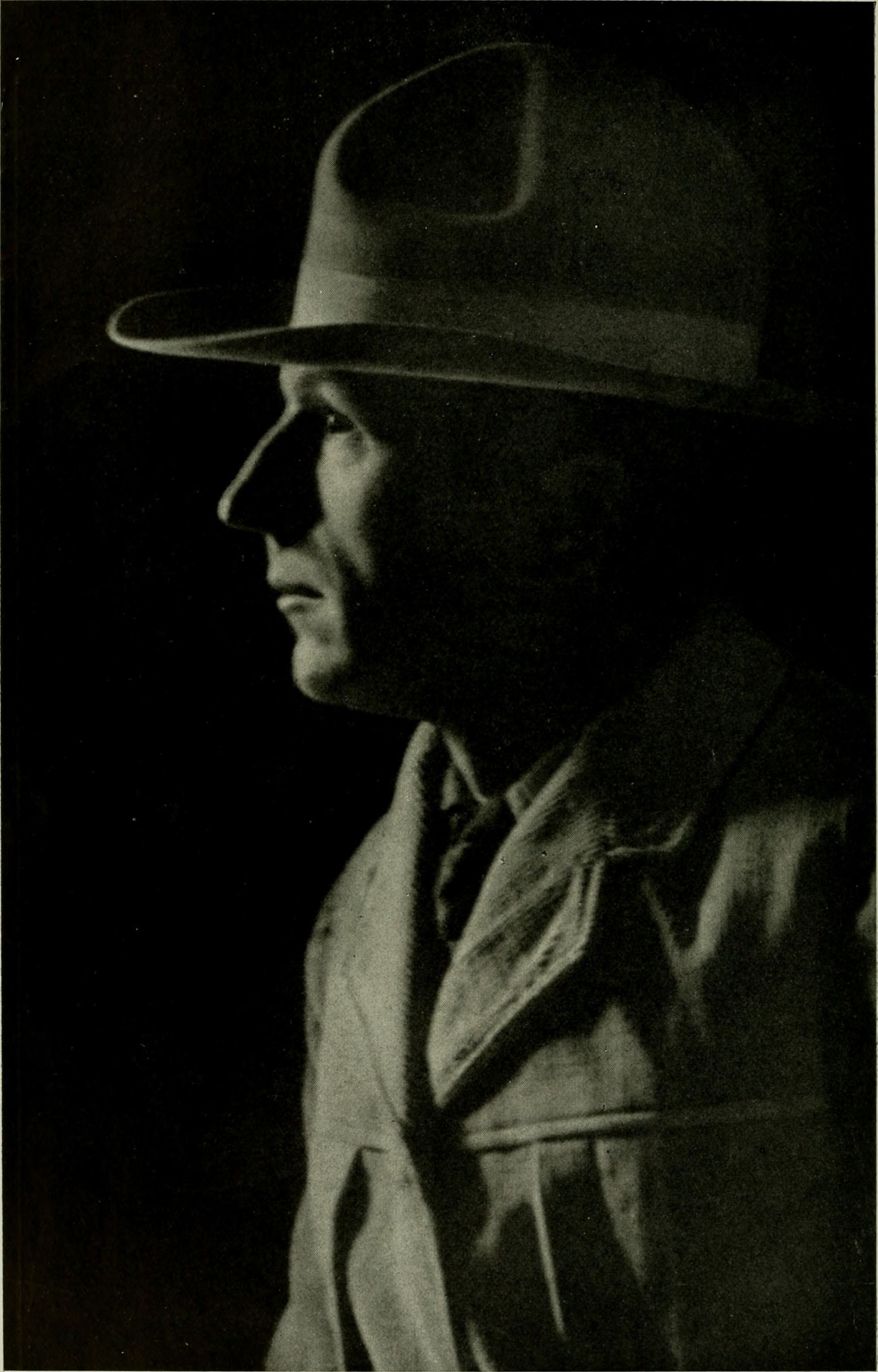
- Born: Louis Benton Akin; June 6, 1868; Portland, Oregon, USA
- Died: January 2, 1913 (aged 44); Flagstaff, Arizona, USA
- Occupations: Painter, Illustrator
- Years active: 1900-1912

Louis Benton Akin (1868–1913) was an American painter and illustrator of the early twentieth century. He is best known for his landscapes of the Grand Canyon and his depictions of Hopi cultural life.

Akin was born in Portland, Oregon, on June 6, 1868. He began his early career there as a sign painter. In 1893, he moved to New York City to attend art school at the Art League of New York. For the following several years he worked as an illustrator for books and magazines. However, an obituary characterized his work during this time as, "not very important."

Around 1903, Akin relocated to the Hopi Reservation in Northern Arizona. He lived with the Hopi for a few years and painted many aspects of their daily life. By 1905 he was showing his works in New York City, Philadelphia, and elsewhere. His work generated general interest, but some critics had reservations about its overall quality.

In the same year, his talent was discovered by Arizona Railways that funded him to portrait a sketch on Indians to highlight significance of the region as a tourist destination. He toured the area to paint his famed paintings Hopi and other life-depicting portraits. His artwork depicting the life of Indians were admiringly adopted by the Railways advertisement printouts.

For the rest of his life, Akin alternated time between New York City and Arizona, with a few trips to North American wilderness areas. Akin became known for numerous landscapes of the Grand Canyon, but also painted the Canadian Rockies and Glacier National Park.

In 1911, the American Museum of Natural History granted Akin a commission to paint murals for the museum's "Southwest Room." The murals were to depict Hopi cultural life and nearby landscapes. Akin died before completing the murals, but his studies were exhibited posthumously in New York and Flagstaff.

Akin died of pneumonia on January 2, 1913, in Flagstaff, Arizona. He was 44.
