= James Aiken =

James Aiken may refer to:

- James Aiken (politician) (1888–1974), politician in Manitoba, Canada
- James E. Aiken (born 1941), American prison consultant and expert witness
- James A. Aiken (born 1967), United States Navy admiral
- Jim Aiken (James Wilson Aiken, 1899–1961), American football player and coach

== See also ==
- Jim Aiken (concert promoter) (1932–2007), Irish concert promoter
