= John Aitken (biologist) =

English reproductive biologist

Robert John Aitken
- Born: 4 September 1947 (age 79); Bath, England
- Education: University of London; University College of North Wales; Cambridge University
- Known for: Research in human reproductive medicine Impact of oxidative stress and male infertility
- Awards: 2012 NSW Scientist of the Year, 2016 Carl G. Hartman Award, 2021 Clarke Medal
- Scientific career
- Fields: Researcher, andrologist/reproductive biologist
- Workplaces: University of Edinburgh; University of Newcastle
- Doctoral advisor: Roger Short

Robert John Aitken (born 4 September 1947) is an Anglo-Australian reproductive biologist, widely known for identifying oxidative stress as a significant contribution to infertility and its actions on human sperm function. He also made substantial contributions to clinical practice translation in male reproductive health, notably the development of new contraceptive vaccine.

He was born in Bath, England but moved to Australia in 1997, where he took Chair of Biological Sciences at the University of Newcastle, then nominated to Pro-Vice-Chancellor of the Faculty of Health and Medicine and Laureate Professor of Biological Sciences at the University of Newcastle since 2013. He is currently Fellow of the Royal Society of Edinburgh, the Australian Academy of Science and the Australian Academy of Health and Medical Sciences, a former president of the International Society of Andrology. Aitken also founded and directed the Priority Research Centre in Reproduction at the University of Newcastle, where he and his colleagues work on a broad spectrum of reproductive issues from conception to parturition.

Aitken has received many honours for his contributions to science throughout his career, including the Carl G. Hartman Award and the 2012 NSW Scientist. Aitken is the most cited author of several biology journals, particularly in the field of Andrology: Reproduction, Molecular Human Reproduction, International Journal of Andrology, Journal of Andrology.

== Early life and education ==
Aitken was born in Bath, in England, on 4 September 1947. Born into a family of real estate agents in Devon, he attended Barnstaple Boys Grammar School, but quit at the age of 16 to follow his parents' footsteps and become an estate agent. After six months of selling houses to the semi-rural residents of Barnstaple, Aitken decided to return to school. He then re-enrolled at his former school to study art, English, and geography, but they were all full, so he had no choice but to study chemistry, botany, and zoology, despite his initial intention to avoid science.

Aitken graduated from the University of London, where he received a Bachelor of Science (Special Honours) in 1967. While at university, he studied zoology, specifically embryology, which made him interested in reproductive biology, prompting him to pursue a Master's degree in Embryology and Mammalian Reproduction from the University College of North Wales in 1969.

He continued his post-graduate studies focusing on wild animal reproduction in Veterinary Clinical Studies at the University of Cambridge under Professor Roger Short's supervision.

=== First scientific papers ===
In 1971, Aitken's first paper, "Ultrastructural changes in the uterine glands of the Roe deer during delayed implantation” was published in the Journal of Physiology. After 4 years working with Dr Roger Short, Aitken completed his thesis, and received a PhD for research on reproductive study in roe deer from the University of Cambridge in 1973.

== Scientific career ==
=== 1973–1976: first start on research career ===
After Cambridge, Aitken started a postdoctoral position at the University of Edinburgh's Institute of Animal Genetics, working collaboratively with Anne McLaren, a graduate from the University of Oxford. However, for the first 12 months at Edinburgh, he had not done any outstanding research due to transformations in study models from descriptive on wild animals to mechanistic approaches using the mouse, as well as changes in laboratories. Despite initial difficulties, he became familiar with new study models of in vitro fertilisation and embryo transfer in the second year. In later years, combining these techniques with electrophoretic analysis of proteins, his publication rate rose dramatically and was being cited by other scientists at that time.

==== WHO mission ====
In late 1975, Aitken was invited to study problems associated with fertility regulation at the World Health Organisation (WHO)'s Human Reproduction Unit in Geneva. As consulting scientists of WHO, he and Mike Harper conducted several reviews on fertility control strategies, which help prevent or disrupt implantation.

Returning from the WHO informative sessions, he worked as a postdoctoral fellow at the University of Bordeaux for 1 year before continuing his research activities at the University of Edinburgh in September 1977.

=== 1977–1981: human reproductive study ===
Despite a short period at WHO, Aitken had the opportunity to consider all the problems that concern human health, particular infertility issue, during his time here, which prompted him to pursue research in human reproductive biology.

In 1977, Aitken had been appointed to the first Medical Research Council Centre for Reproductive Health at University of Edinburgh, where he and his team focused on the biochemistry of implantation. During his early days at the newly founded centre, he found an advanced technique for examining proteins and carbohydrates more precisely during the pre-ovulatory period to study hormonal control of implantation. Despite early achievements, his team had suspended all research activities due to material shortage from gynaecology wards.

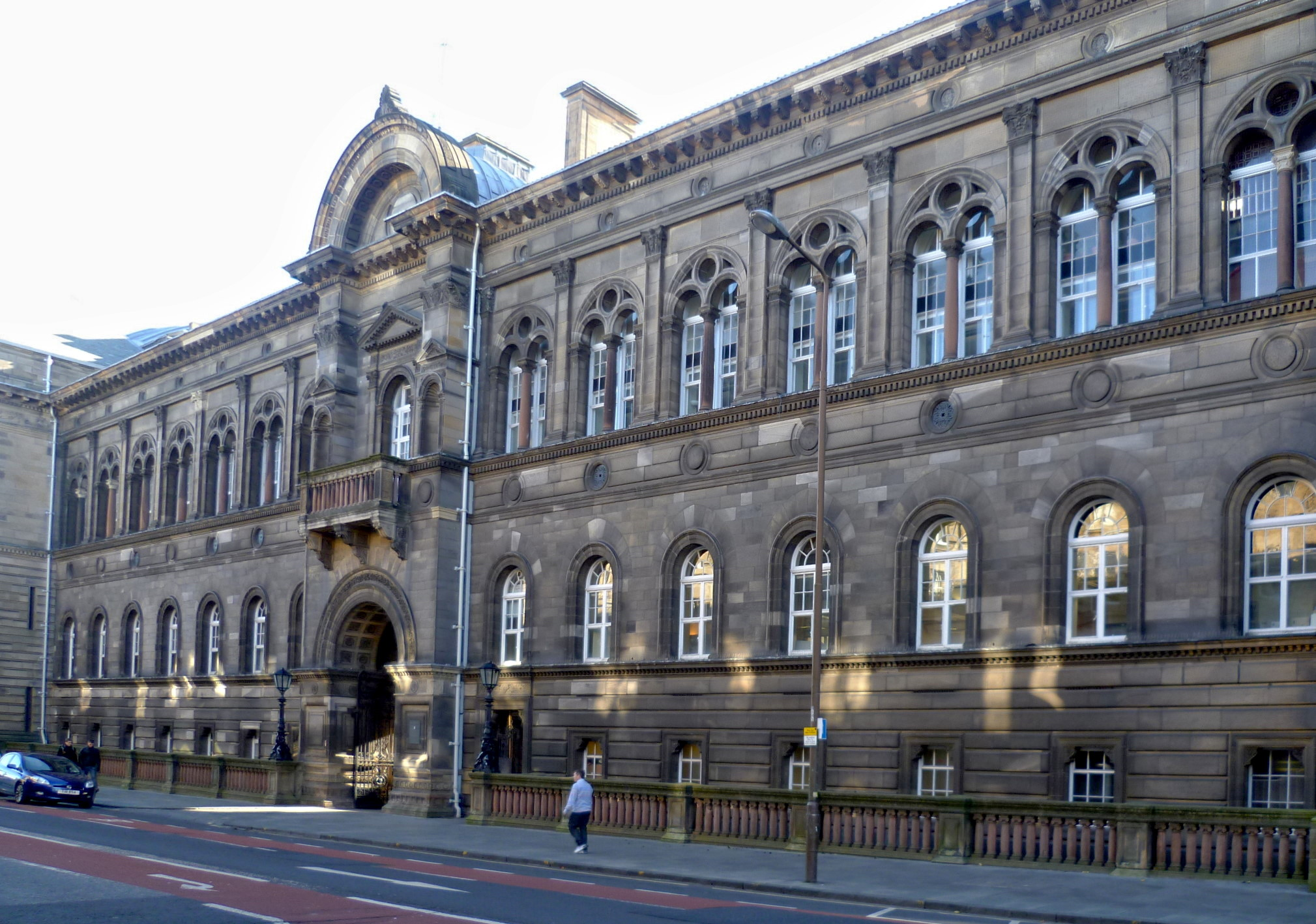
Edinburgh Medical School, where Aitken spent over 25 years doing the reproductive study.

=== 1982–1998: initiative in andrology ===
After months of waiting for clinical supplies, Aitken took the lead in Andrology with Roger Short and David Mortimer's encouragement, despite the fact that the discipline was still in its infancy around the 1950s. With this transition in research styles, he could gain direct access without relying on his clinical colleagues' supply, thus solving the need for clinical materials. In 1982, he was promoted to senior scientist at the Medical Research Council; however, it was initially difficult since he and his team were all obscure about how they could influence this field. After few years with renovated laboratory facilities, Aitken started to focus his future study on clinical research into male contraceptives, androgen physiology, and male infertility, especially molecular mechanisms that regulate sperm function.

Aitken remained at the University of Edinburgh for most of the 1980s to 1990s. It was there that he discovered an abnormally free radical attack in failures of fertilisation and later did research on the relationship between reactive oxygen species and their effects on impaired sperm function. He also proposed new techniques in contraception that had helped prevent sexually transmitted diseases and treat male infertility. These contributions laid the foundation for the reproductive studies done in the latter half of the twentieth century and later.

==== Oxidative stress ====
During the time at the University of Edinburgh, Aitken worked with multiple antibodies to analyse their effects on fertilisation and human sperm function. When he gave the administration of A23187 to spermatozoa from normal fertile and oligospermia, he discovered a decline in fertilisation rates at a higher dose, which reduced sperm motility. In attempt to explain the cellular basis of defective sperm function association in a 1987 paper in the Journal of Reproduction and Fertility, he found a sudden burst of production of reactive oxygen species (ROS) associated with the free radical attack in male infertility. The hyperactive production of ROS causes peroxidative damage to the sperm plasma membrane, which is known as oxidative stress, resulting in loss of sperm function.

The discovery was later acknowledged by thousands of scientists as a foundational concept in studying oxygen species associated pathophysiology. Aitken's paper had expanded on the molecular modifications of oxidants in male infertility and resulted in new therapeutic intervention methods to maintain reproductive function.

==== Contraceptive vaccine ====
Besides discovering oxidative stress, Aitken also improved the male contraceptive vaccine in later years. His paper in the European Journal of Pharmacology in 1990 proposed 3 possible targets, including hCG, zona pellucida and sperm surface for contraception development. This research provided the foundation for designing a long-lasting and reversible form of contraceptives, providing an effective method to help prevent sexually transmitted diseases and control the world's growing population.

=== 1998–2004: emigration to Australia ===
The University of Cambridge awarded Aitken a Doctor of Science (ScD) in 1998 to recognise his achievements in gamete biology. At the same time, he got a phone call from the University of Newcastle, inviting him to take up the Chair of Biological Sciences. He first declined because he mistook Newcastle for Newcastle upon Tyne, but then agreed after learning that the university is in Australia. It was here that he later took part in several important roles such as Head of School, Director of an ARC Centre of Excellence then Pro-Vice-Chancellor of the Faculty of Health and Medicine at the University of Newcastle.

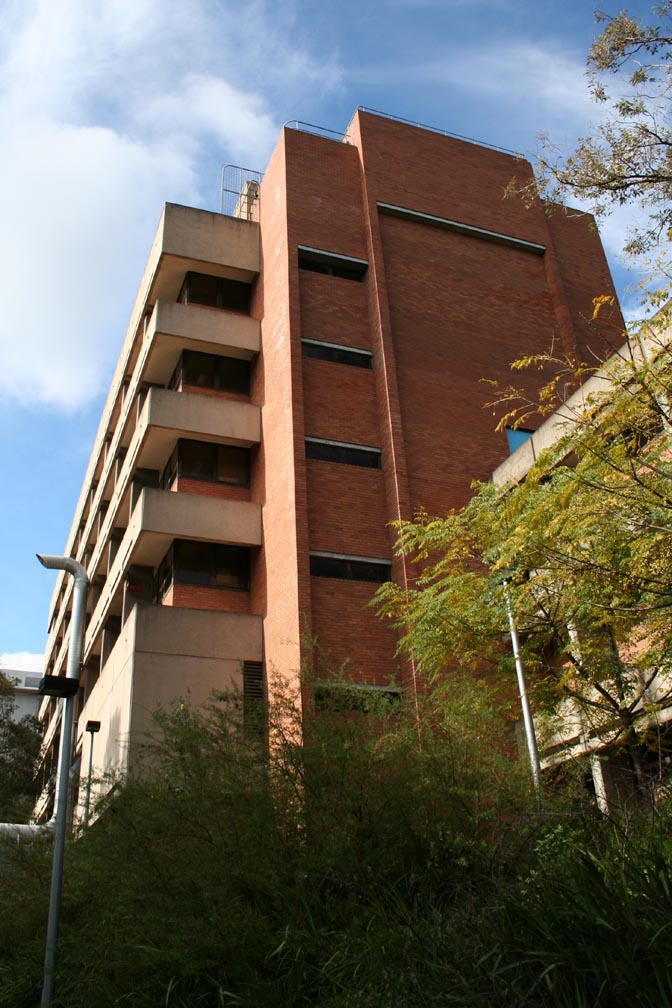
Aitken has been working at University of Newcastle since 1998.

While serving high positions at the University of Newcastle, Aitken continued his research career on the reproductive studies. He and his colleagues conducted further research on the effects of oxidative stress on the physiological and functional integrity of human sperm. They also researched related oxidative stress problems, such as genetic alterations in male infertility, which culminated in gene mutations, discussing the possible health issues of the next generation from couples using assisted reproductive technology.

He and his colleagues continued to research safe and reliable contraception vaccinations for controlling human fertility. Their study included developing the potential contraceptive potential of ZP3 peptides and other chemical compositions of these contraceptive agents, implying the potential effectiveness of the anti-hCG antibodies.

During his early years in Australia, Aitken attempted to diverge his studies from human reproductive science. He released articles that helped identify diseases in various Australian species, including tammar wallaby and brushtail possum. In addition, he discovered Ehrlichia platys in dogs in Australia, which had not previously been found in Australian animals. However, after few years, he decided to return to andrology and the pursuit of understanding the cell biology of spermatozoa.

=== 2005–2018 ===
According to Google Scholar, this is the period where Aitken's papers were receiving an increasing number of citations. During this time, Aitken and his team carried out some studies to identify different causes affecting male reproductive health. They found that environmental conditions such as smoking, toxins, and mobile radiation contribute to various health issues. These not simply affect male fertility by causing oxidative stress, but they also cause DNA damage, increasing the risk of a man's children developing infertility or cancer.

Along with the studies on DNA integrity, the effect of radiofrequency radiation on fertility, contraceptive and fertility preservation in patients, Aitken has been working on molecular markers of oxidative stress and developing sensitive methods to measure reactive oxygen species generation by cells. Their discovery showed the effectiveness of numerous diagnostic techniques, such as chemiluminescence, spectrophotometry, and flow cytometry, as an indicator of oxidative stress, emphasizing the general significance of mitochondrial dysregulation in impaired sperm activity.

Despite not gaining much success in the animal study, his contribution to developing immunocontraception on animals ranging from horses, sub-mammalian organisms to annelid worms, oysters, and fish enabled the development of a nonsurgical sterilization technique. In 2015, he received a patent for his "Method for reducing the Reproductive Potential of an Animal" while working with Eileen McLaughlin. His invention revolutionized Australian horse breeding industry, which provided a new method of controlling the horse population and increase their value.

=== 2018–current ===
In more recent years, Aitken has been focusing on translational research in male contraception and male infertility. Since 2016, he has been working alongside Memphasis to develop "Felix", a device which uses a patented cell separation technology to more gently and effectively separate sperm from semen samples. This project seeks to increase the collection of vital, stable sperm during the crucial early stages of the IVF process.

== Awards and honours ==
=== Awards ===
- 1986–87: Walpole Prize for fertility research, Society for Reproduction and Fertility
- 2006: Faculty Award for Research Excellence, University of Newcastle
- 2011: Excellence in Innovation, University of Newcastle
- 2012: NSW Scientist of the Year
- 2016: Carl G. Hartman Award, Society for the Study of Reproduction, USA
- 2021: Clarke Medal, Royal Society of New South Wales

=== Membership in professional societies ===
- 1995–present: Fellow – Royal Society of Edinburgh
- 2011–present: Fellow – Australian Academy of Science
- 2015–present: Fellow – Australian Academy of Health and Medical Sciences
- 2003–2010: Director – ARC Centre of Excellence in Biotechnology and Development
- 2003–2010: Co-director – Priority Research Centre in Reproductive Science, University of Newcastle
- 2012–2017: President – International Society of Andrology
- 2014 - present: Fellow - Royal Society of New South Wales (Est 1821) promulgated by HE the Governor in the NSW Government Gazette February 2018, Chair of the Hunter Branch (2022-24).

== Other interests ==
Aitken's cultural interests go beyond science.

=== Music ===
Before deciding to pursue a career as a scientist, music was his greatest passion. He played the guitar most of the time during his time at the University of London and joined the university's folk music club. He loved the music of Frank Sinatra, Nelson Riddle Orchestra and especially Bob Dylan.
