= Blair Aiken =

American racing driver (born 1956)

- Born: September 2, 1956 (age 70)

NASCAR Cup Series career
- 2 races run over 1 year
- Best finish: 72nd (1985)
- First race: 1985 Budweiser 400 (Riverside)
- Last race: 1985 Winston Western 500 (Riverside)
Wins	Top tens	Poles
0	0	0

ARCA Menards Series West career
- 25 races run over 4 years
- Best finish: 5th (1985)
- First race: 1985 AC-Delco 200 (Sonoma)
- Last race: 1998 Spears Manufacturing 250 (Mesa Marin)
Wins	Top tens	Poles
0	13	0
- Statistics up to date as of May 23, 2025.

Blair Aiken (born September 2, 1956) is an American former stock car racing driver. He made two NASCAR Winston Cup Series starts in 1985. He also was a factor on the Winston West tour for a number of years.

== Winston West ==
Aiken had a solid first season in the NASCAR Winston West Series in 1985. That year, competing full time for Stoke Racing, Aiken had a best finish of fourth and finished the season fifth in the points standings. After a single start for Stoke in 1986, Aiken did not compete in the series again until 1997, when he only made one start. Aiken's last races came in 1998, when he finished sixteenth in points with three top-fives and thirteen top-tens. That included a career best third at Mesa Marin. After attempting to qualify for the 1999 season opener, he would not compete in the series again.

== Winston Cup ==
Aiken made two NASCAR Winston Cup Series starts, both combination races with the West Series, in 1985. Aiken debuted at Riverside, starting the race in 36th. Due to engine failure, Aiken would fall to 38th in the event, only completing twenty four laps. Later in the year, Aiken would return to Riverside, competing in what served as the finale for both Winston Cup and Winston West. Starting from 34th place, Aiken was able to finish the race and do so in 29th.

== Post-racing career ==
After retiring from racing, Aiken became the manager and promoter at Ukiah Speedway in California.

== Motorsports career results ==
=== NASCAR ===
(key) (Bold – Pole position awarded by qualifying time. Italics – Pole position earned by points standings or practice time. * – Most laps led.)

==== Winston Cup Series ====
NASCAR Winston Cup Series results
Year	Team	No.	Make	1	2	3	4	5	6	7	8	9	10	11	12	13	14	15	16	17	18	19	20	21	22	23	24	25	26	27	28	NWCC	Pts	Ref
1985	Stoke Racing	99	Chevy	DAY	RCH	CAR	ATL	BRI	DAR	NWS	MAR	TAL	DOV	CLT	RSD; 38	POC	MCH	DAY	POC	TAL	MCH	BRI	DAR	RCH	DOV	MAR	NWS	CLT	CAR	ATL	RSD; 29	72nd	125	

==== Winston West Series ====
NASCAR Winston West Series results
Year	Team	No.	Make	1	2	3	4	5	6	7	8	9	10	11	12	13	14	NWWC	Pts	Ref
1985	Stoke Racing	99	Chevy	SON; 7	SHA; 4	RSD; 38	MMR; 7	SIR; 8	POR; 8	STA; 5	YAK; 9	EVG; 7	WSR; 9	MMR; 7	RSD; 29			5th	518	
1986	Stoke Racing	99	Chevy	SON	RSD	EVG	RCS	TAC	PIR; 14	WSR	RSD							39th	37	
1997	BAO Racing	69	Chevy	TUS	AMP; 16	SON	TUS	MMR	LVS	CAL	EVG	POR	PPR	AMP	SON	MMR	LVS	65th	115	
1998	BAO Racing	69	Chevy	TUS; DNQ	LVS; 23	PHO; 26	CAL; 22	HPT; 10	MMR; 3	AMP; 6	POR; 15	CAL; 20	PPR; 26	EVG	SON; 28	MMR; 19	LVS	16th	1291	
1999	BAO Racing	69	Chevy	TUS; DNQ	LVS	PHO	CAL	PPR	MMR	IRW	EVG	POR	IRW	RMR	LVS	MMR	MOT	92nd	55	
