= Atkinson Township =

Atkinson Township may refer to:

- Atkinson Township, Henry County, Illinois
- Atkinson Township, Carlton County, Minnesota
- Atkinson Township, Holt County, Nebraska
