= Walter Scott Adkins =

American paleontologist

Walter Scott Adkins (24 December 1890 – 22 September 1956) was a geologist and paleontologist, known for his books Handbook of Texas Cretaceous Fossils (1928) and "The Mesozoic Systems in Texas" (1933). He is also known for his work on the distribution of shoestring and barrier sands in the subsurface of the Miocene and for his work on the origin and migration of petroleum.

== Biography ==
Adkins earned a B.S. from the University of Tennessee in 1910. He was a graduate student in entomology at the University of Tennessee and then at Columbia University, where he studied Drosophila under Thomas Hunt Morgan. Adkins was a professor from 1913 to 1915 teaching geology at Texas Christian University, from 1916 to 1918 teaching anatomy at the Illinois Medical School, and from 1918 to 1919 teaching anatomy at Baylor Medical School. He worked for the Texas Bureau of Economic Geology from 1919 to 1921 and for the Mexican petroleum company El Águila from 1921 to 1925. In 1925–1926, he went to France and studied at the Sorbonne under Émile Haug. In 1926 Adkins returned to Texas to rejoin the Bureau of Economic Geology, where he remained until 1934 when he started work for the Shell Development Company. As chief stratigrapher and head of special problems research, Adkins worked for Shell until he retired in 1950.

Adkins's first marriage ended in divorce; his first marriage produced a son, Jack Scott Adkins (1922–1944), who was killed in the Anzio invasion. The second marriage of W. S. Adkins was to a former student, Mary Grace Muse.

Adkins was chosen as the first paleontologist to hold a Guggenheim Fellowship, which was for the academic year 1931–1932.

== Selected works ==
- Adkins, W. S. (1918). The Weno and Pawpaw formations of the Texas Comanchean & On a new ammonite fauna of the lower Turonian of Mexico. University of Texas at Austin. hdl:2152/53802.
- Adkins, W. S.; Winton, W. M. (1919). Paleontological correlation of the Fredericksburg and Washita formations in North Texas. University of Texas at Austin. hdl:2152/78081.
- Adkins, W. S.; Winton, W. M. (1919). Geology of Tarrant County. University of Texas at Austin.
- Adkins, W. S. (1923). Geology and mineral resources of McLennan County. University of Texas at Austin. hdl:2152/77818.
- Adkins, W. S. (1927). The geology and mineral resources of the Fort Stockton quadrangle. University of Texas at Austin. hdl:2152/23719.
- Adkins, W. S. (1928). Handbook of Texas Cretaceous fossils. University of Texas at Austin. hdl:2152/77961.
- Adkins, W. S.; Arick, M. B. (1930). Geology of Bell county, Texas. University of Texas at Austin. hdl:2152/23721.
- Adkins, W. S. (1932). "The Mesozoic systems in Texas". The geology of Texas. Vol. 1: Stratigraphy. University of Texas at Austin. hdl:2152/24040.
