= James Aitken =

James Aitken may refer to:

- James Aitken (bishop) (1612/3–1687), Scottish Episcopal bishop
- James Aitken (footballer) (1882–1915), Australian rules footballer
- James Aitken (priest) (1829–1908), Church of England priest and multi-sports player
- James Alfred Aitken (1846–1897), Scottish painter
- James Macrae Aitken (1908–1983), Scottish chess player
- James Smith Aitken (1881–1964), politician in Saskatchewan, Canada
- Jim Aitken (born 1947), British businessman and former Scotland international rugby union player
- Jimmy Aitken (1872–1944), former Australian rules footballer
- John the Painter (1752–1777), also known as James Aitken, Scot who committed acts of terror in British naval dockyards in 1776–77
