= Atkinson, Nova Scotia =

Community in Nova Scotia, Canada

Coordinates: 45°37′58″N 63°43′47″W

Atkinson in Nova Scotia

Atkinson is a community in the Canadian province of Nova Scotia, located in Cumberland County.
