= George Atkin =

American politician and Mormon missionary

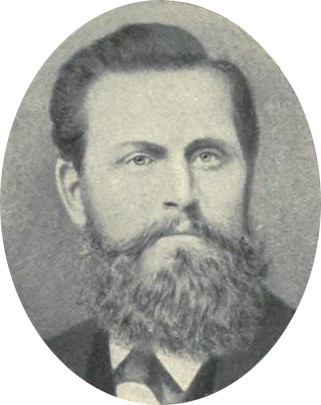

Member of the Utah Assembly from Tooele County
- In office January 10 – February 18, 1876
- Preceded by: John Rowberry
- Succeeded by: George R. Warren

Personal details
- Born: March 12, 1836
- Died: January 3, 1899 (aged 62)
- Party: Utah People Party

George Atkin (1836–1899) was an American politician and Mormon pioneer who served in the Utah Territorial House of Representatives for Tooele County.

== Early life ==
George Atkin was born on 12 March 1836 in Louth, Lincolnshire, England, to Thomas Atkin and Mary Morley. His family were originally members of the Methodist Church, but they converted to the Church of Jesus Christ of Latter-day Saints in 1843 when George was seven years old. He was baptized into the faith on 13 September 1846.

In January 1849, the Atkin family emigrated to the United States to join other Latter-day Saints in Utah. They sailed from Liverpool on the ship Zetland on 29 January 1849 as part of a group led by Orson Spencer. The family arrived in the Salt Lake Valley on 25 September 1849 after a challenging journey across the plains, during which they encountered illness and other hardships.

== Life in Utah ==
In 1850, the Atkin family was called to settle in the Tooele Valley. George's father, Thomas, was a carpenter by trade and contributed significantly to the development of the community. On 20 May 1856, George married Sarah Matilda Utley. They had nine children together. On 22 November 1883, George took a second wife, Emma Johnson, in accordance with the practice of plural marriage.

=== Civic and Church Service ===
In 1857, when President Brigham Young called out the militia to defend against approaching United States troops, George was selected as a captain in the militia. He was also a Sunday School teacher and served as a counselor to Eli Lee, the Sunday School Superintendent. In 1864, George was elected as a director of the Tooele Library, and in 1876, he served a mission to Great Britain.

George also participated in several rescue missions to bring stranded emigrants to the Salt Lake Valley.

== Political career ==
Atkin served in multiple political offices including Mayor of Tooele and a member of the Utah Territorial Legislative Assembly.
