= James Edward Adkins =

British composer

James Edward Adkins FRCO (14 Dec 1867 - 4 January 1939) was an Irish organist and composer.

== Background ==
He was born on 14 December 1867 in Belfast, the son of James Adkins and Emma Ryan. He studied at the Royal College of Music and trained at Ely Cathedral under the organist, Edmund Thomas Chipp.

He married Louisa Day on 29 July 1889 in Richmond Upon Thames. They had four children:

- Edith Grace Adkins b.1890
- Edouardine Adkins b.1892
- James Francis Basil Adkins 1899 - 1917
- Eric Alan Edward Adkins 1904 - 1982

His son James Francis Basil Adkins, a Private in the 2nd Battalion of the Suffolk Regiment, was killed in Flanders on 1 Oct 1917. His other son Eric was also a fine musician. Both Basil and Eric were St Paul's Cathedral choir boys.

Whilst in Preston he was conductor of the Preston Amateur Operatic Society 1895 - 1901, Conductor of Chorley Choral Society, 1890 – 1891, and Conductor of Preston Choral Society, 1905 - 1907.

He died on 4 January 1939 in Amounderness, Lancashire.

== Appointments ==
- Organist at St Anne's Church, Wandsworth
- Organist at All Saints' Church, Grosvenor Road, London
- Organist at St Stephen's Church, East Twickenham
- Organist at St George's Church, Esher
- Organist at Preston Parish Church 1890 – 1912

== Publications ==
- Preston Parish Church: its organists, choir, and organs, 1574-1915.

== Compositions ==
He composed

- Magnificat and nunc dimittis in D 1898
- Tears, idle Tears. Four-Part Song for mixed voices 1908
- Magnificat and nunc dimittis for men's voices 1910
- Magnificat and nunc dimittis in G 1911
- Magnificat for treble voices 1911
- Te Deum for treble voices 1911
- Te Deum in G 1911
- Jubilate in G 1911
- Hibernia (Overture) Adagio & Allegretto from the Brandenburg Concerto No. 1. J. S. Bach. Arrangement 1923
