= Aiken, Bell County, Texas =

Ghost town in Texas, US

- Ghost town
- Location within Texas
- Coordinates: 31.16630500°N 97.46729900°W
- Country: United States
- State: Texas
- County: Bell
- Named for: Herman Aiken

Aiken is a ghost town in Bell County, Texas, United States. The area was settled in 1857, by pioneer Abner Kuykendall, and brought in other residents, including namesake pioneer Herman Aiken. At its peak during the American Civil War, it had a population of 600, and its economy was based on wartime production. A post office operated from 1868 to 1872. Since the 1950s, it has been flooded by Belton Lake.
