= Aiken, Shelby County, Texas =

Unincorporated community in Shelby County, Texas, United States

Coordinates: 31°41′24″N 94°19′56″W

Aiken is an unincorporated community in Shelby County, Texas. It is home to the Excelsior Independent School District. As of 2000, the population is 75.

== History ==
Aiken had a sawmill, a blacksmith, a school, 2 churches, a cotton gin, and a store in 1890s, but the post office closed in 1909 and only the school and churches remained.

== Education ==
Aiken is served by the Excelsior Independent School District.
