= John Aitken (surgeon) =

Scottish surgeon (died 1790)

John Aitken MD, FRCSEd (died 22 September 1790) was a Scottish surgeon, author and the first extramural teacher of medical subjects in Edinburgh since the foundation of the Edinburgh Medical school in 1726.

John Aitken. Engraving by C Knight based on a painting by J Donaldson.

== Early life ==
Little is known about his early life. He is described as "Scotus" on matriculation rolls indicating that he was Scottish. He matriculated at the University of Edinburgh in 1763 to study anatomy, surgery, and chemistry and again in 1769 when he studied the theory and practice of medicine and midwifery. In 1770, he was admitted as a Freeman or Fellow of the Royal College of Surgeons of Edinburgh. He was elected Senior President of the Medical Society of Edinburgh (later the Royal Medical Society) on two occasions: in 1774–75, and again in 1775–76.

== Career ==
Aitken became a surgeon in the Royal Infirmary of Edinburgh. In 1779 he is described as surgeon and lecturer on surgery in Edinburgh. He became teacher of medical students giving lectures in "The Edinburgh Anatomical theatre", where he also gave demonstrations of anatomical dissection. The "Anatomical Theatre" was in Surgeons' Square and Aitken appears to have been the first to give lectures outside the University Medical School and is therefore one of the first, if not the first, extramural teachers of medicine in Edinburgh since the foundation of the university medical school in 1726. His lectures were described as "well attended and he was generally esteemed as a good lecturer". He also wrote several books, chiefly as textbooks for his lectures. They were said to 'contain much valuable information, and show him to be fully conversant with the literature and philosophy as well as the practical department of his profession."

John Aitken made certain practical improvements in surgery. He introduced an alteration in the mode of locking midwifery forceps "to render the matter easier for the practitioner and... more safe for the mother and child." He also invented a flexible blade to the lever. He likewise invented and described in his Essays and Cases in Surgery a pair of "forceps for dividing and diminishing the stone in the bladder, when too large to remove entire by lithotomy."

Aitken also devised a mobile saw used to divide the pubic symphysis where the pelvis was too narrow to allow delivery of the foetus. This saw was made from a clock chain into which serrations had been cut. It remained in widespread use in obstetrics until it was displaced by the wire saw devised for the purpose by the Italian obstetrician Leonardo Gigle.

It is not clear where he graduated MD, which he included as a post-nominal from 1783. His name does not appear on the graduation lists of any of the Scottish universities or Trinity College Dublin, but it is possible that he obtained this qualification in Europe.

His entry in the 1905 Dictionary of National Biography used the spelling "Aitkin", but all of his publications and other biographical sources use the spelling "Aitken".

His portrait forms the frontispiece to Elements of Physic and Surgery, London 1779.

== Works ==
He wrote:

- Essays on several important subjects in surgery, chiefly with regard to the nature and cure of fractures, London, 1771, 8vo.
- 'Essays and Cases in Surgery, London, 1775, 8vo.
- Conspectus Rei Chirurgicæ, Edinburgh. 1777, 8vo.
- Medical Improvement; an Address to the Medical Society of Edinburgh, Edinburgh. 1777, 12mo.
- Elements of the Theory and Practice of Surgery, Edinburgh. 1779, 8vo, republished with the ‘Elements of the Theory and Practice of Physic, thus forming 2 vols. entitled Elements of the Theory and Practice of Physic and Surgery, London, 1783, 8vo (with portrait).
- Outlines of the Theory and Cure of Fever, London, 1781, 12mo.
- Principles of Midwifery or Puerperal Medicine, 1784, 8vo.
- Osteology; or a Treatise on the Bones of the Human Skeleton, London, 1785, 8vo.
- Principles of Anatomy and Physiology, Edinburgh. 1786, 2 vols. 8vo.
- Essays on Fractures and Luxations, London 1790, 8vo.
