= Aickin =

Aickin is a surname, and may refer to:

- A pair of Irish actor brothers:

- Francis Aickin (died 1805)
- James Aickin (died 1803)

- Frank Aickin (1894–1982), New Zealand railway administrator
- George Aickin (1869–1937), Australian priest (born in England)
- Keith Aickin (1916–1982), Australian judge
- Rob Aickin, New Zealand record producer and musician
