= Adkinson =

Adkinson is an English patronymic surname derived from a diminutive form Adkin for Adam. Notable people with the surname include:

- Joseph B. Adkinson (1892–1965), American Medal of Honor recipient
- Mary Osburn Adkinson (1843–1918), American social reformer
