= Glenn Aitken (singer) =

London-based New Zealand singer-songwriter (born 1970)

- Birth name: Glenn Finlay Aitken
- Born: 14 December 1970 (age 54); New Zealand
- Occupation(s): Singer-songwriter, musician, actor
- Instrument(s): guitar, piano, saxophone
- Years active: 1995–present
- Labels: G-String Records; MPL Communications
- Website: glennaitken.com

Glenn Aitken (born in New Zealand on 14 December 1970) also known as Glenn Finlay Aitken, is a London-based New Zealand singer-songwriter and multi-instrumentalist. In 2010, he released his debut studio album entitled Extraordinary Lives.

== Career ==
Glenn Aitken learned piano at an early age and went on to learn guitar and saxophone. He played his music in many countries including China, Malaysia, and Thailand. During one of his tours in the Maldives, he had his big break when Sir Paul McCartney discovered him while holidaying there. Aitken moved to London in 2003 where he is based now.

"The Way", a song composed and performed by Aitken, appeared on a special compilation by Sir Paul McCartney entitled Paul McCartney's Glastonbury Groove. The album contains some of Paul McCartney's favourite songs of 2004 as published in UNCUT magazine and distributed as a free CD with the magazine.

Since coming to England, Aitken has had his music published by MPL Communications, a holding company owned by McCartney. Aitken has also been a finalist in the 2004, 2005, 2006, 2007 and 2010 UK Songwriting Contests. He also won the Roland UK Loopstation Championship in 2008, was runner up in 2009, and finalist in 2010.

Aitken released his début album, Extraordinary Lives, in June 2010. The album produced by John Ravenhall contains 14 tracks, and includes guest artists such as Paul McCartney, Greg Lyons and Strings by the Chicago Symphonic Orchestra.

Platform - the second album was released in July 2013. It contains 15 tracks.

== Discography ==
=== Albums ===
- 2010: Extraordinary Lives
- 2013: Platform

==== Track list: (Extraordinary Lives) ====
1. "Ordinary People" (5:32)
2. "Just No" (3:46)
3. "Don't Say Never" (4:04)
4. "The Way" (3:41)
5. "Little Bird" (3:47)
6. "Never Find the Right Words" (3:54)
7. "Warning Signs" (3:10)
8. "Why Do You Walk on By (Intermission)" (1:23)
9. "Immortalized" (4:14)
10. "Underground" (3:38)
11. "Bundle of Truth" (3:44)
12. "Define Me" (3:38)
13. "Something New" (3:33)
14. "Central Park in Fall" (6:13)

==== Track list: (Platform) ====
1. "Simple Man" (5:16)
2. "Permission To Land" (3:43)
3. "Runaway" (3:38)
4. "Hold On" (4:56)
5. "Fall Down" (3:58)
6. "Woman" (2:55)
7. "I Am The Man" (3:42)
8. "Static" (3:24)
9. "Amaze Me" (3:54)
10. "CC Eyes" (4:33)
11. "Production Line Frankenstein" (4:12)
12. "Same Old Song" (4:29)
13. "Temporary Noose" (3:32)
14. "Overload" (5:22)
15. "All This Time" (3:20)

=== Singles ===
- 2010: "Ordinary People"
- 2011: "Just No" - Playlisted on BBC Radio 2

=== Featured ===
- 2004: "The Way" appears in Paul McCartney's Glastonbury Groove
