= Aitkens =

Aitkens is a surname. Notable people with the surname include:

- Daisy Aitkens (born 1986), English actress, screenwriter and director
- Michael Aitkens (born 1947), British actor and dramatist

== See also ==
- Aikens
