= James Akins (tubist) =

American tubist and music academic (1956–2025)

- Born: James Milton Akins; June 15, 1956; Savannah, Georgia, U.S.
- Died: December 29, 2025 (aged 69) Dublin, Ohio, U.S.
- Education: Ohio State University (BM, MM)
- Genres: Classical
- Occupation: Musician
- Instruments: Tuba, Native American flute
- Years active: 1981–2025
- Spouse: Lori Mae Akins (m. 1978)

James Milton Akins (June 15, 1956 – December 29, 2025) was an American tubist, music professor, and both a player and maker of Native American flutes. He was also best known for his association with the Columbus Symphony Orchestra.

== Early life and education ==
James Milton Akins was born in Savannah, Georgia on June 15, 1956. He studied the tuba with Ronald Bishop of the Cleveland Orchestra, Arnold Jacobs of the Chicago Symphony Orchestra, Robert Ryker of the Montreal Symphony, Fredrick Schaufele Jr. at Lakewood High School, and Robert LeBlanc of Ohio State University. He received his Bachelor of Music in 1978 and Master of Music in 1982 from Ohio State University.

== Career ==
Akins was associate professor of tuba and euphonium at Ohio State University and was principal tuba of the Columbus Symphony Orchestra from 1981 until 2021. He was a member of the Columbus Symphony Orchestra Brass Quintet, and the Ohio Brass Quintet. Akins was also a clinician and consultant for the Tuba Exchange in Durham, North Carolina, and was a design consultant for various tuba companies including the G+P Instrument Company in Milan. As a consultant for the United Musical Instrument Company, he collaborated in the development of professional tubas, developing several new designs. As a clinician for these companies, Akins gave tuba masterclasses and recitals for high schools and colleges throughout the United States. He also presented masterclasses with the Native American flute and was himself a flute maker. He taught several tubists, including Carol Jantsch as a beginner. His studio at Ohio State University was one of the largest in the country.

== Personal life and death ==
Akins and his wife Lori Mae Akins had two daughters together. He died at his Dublin, Ohio, home on December 29, 2025, at the age of 69.
