= James C. Adkins =

American judge

James C. Adkins Jr.
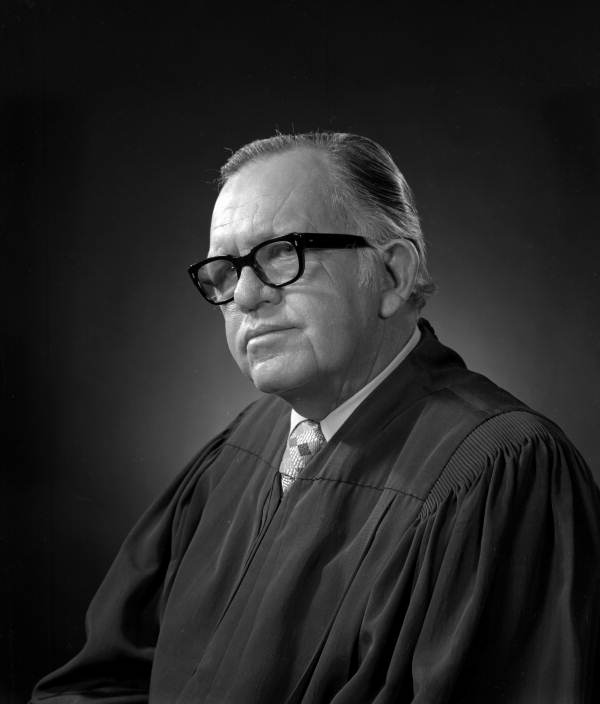

Justice for the Florida Supreme Court
- In office 1969–1987
- Appointed by: Unknown
- In office 1990–1992
- Appointed by: Unknown

Personal details
- Born: James Calhoun Adkins Jr. January 18, 1915 Gainesville, Florida, U.S.
- Died: June 24, 1994 (aged 79) Tallahassee, Florida, U.S.
- Spouse(s): Mildred Frances McInnis; Sue Louise Harris; Ethel May Fox; Elizabeth Ann Carter Lawrence
- Education: University of Florida College of Law

James Calhoun Adkins Jr. (January 18, 1915 – June 24, 1994) was a justice of the Florida Supreme Court.

He was a judge from the U.S. state of Florida. James Adkins served on the Florida Supreme Court from 1969 to 1987. From 1974 to 1976, Adkins served as chief justice.

Adkins graduated from the University of Florida College of Law in 1938 and was a member of Florida Blue Key. While on the Florida Supreme Court, he dealt with student anti-war demonstrations in the 1960s, and reapportionment of the state of Florida in the 1970s.
