= Bellini–Tosi direction finder =

Type of radio direction finder

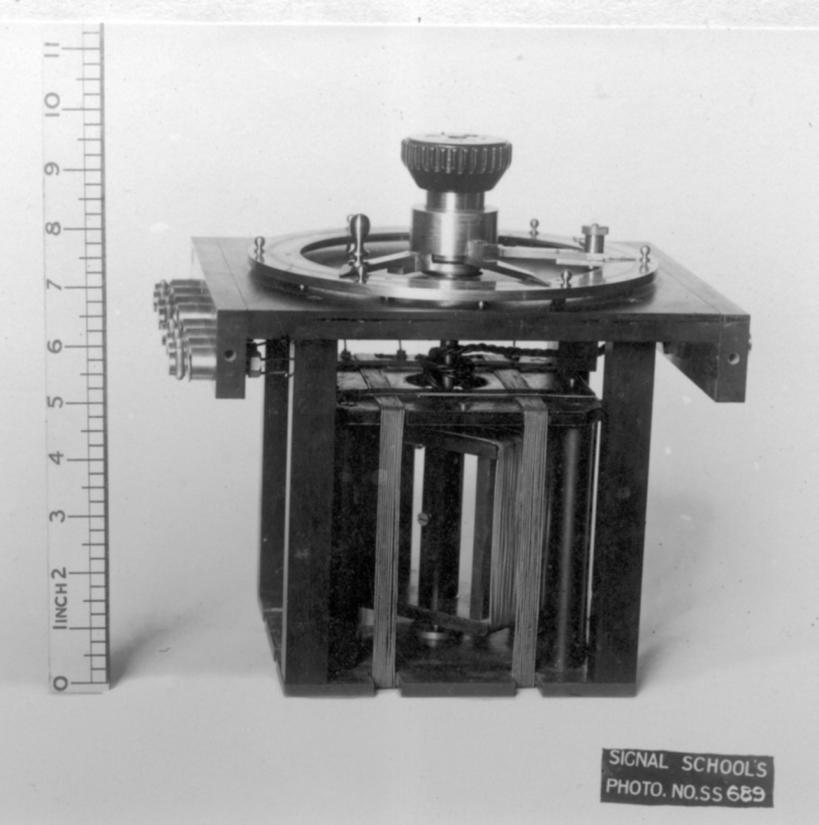
This Royal Navy model is typical of B–T goniometers. The two sets of field coils and the rotating sense coil are visible.

A Bellini–Tosi direction finder (B–T or BTDF) is a type of radio direction finder (RDF), which determines the direction to, or bearing of, a radio transmitter. Earlier RDF systems used very large rotating loop antennas, which the B–T system replaced with two fixed antennae and a small rotating loop, known as a radiogoniometer. This made RDF much more practical, especially on large vehicles like ships or when using very long wavelengths that demand large antennae.

BTDF was invented by a pair of Italian officers in the early 1900s, and is sometimes known as a Marconi–Bellini–Tosi after they joined forces with the Marconi Company in 1912. BTDF was the most prevalent form of naval direction finding from the 1920s to well into the 1980s, and was used as a major part of early long-distance air navigation systems from the 1930s until after World War II. BTDF systems were also widely used for military signals intelligence gathering.

During the war, new techniques like huff-duff began to replace radiogoniometers in the intelligence gathering role, reducing the time needed to take an accurate fix from minutes to seconds. The ability to inexpensively process radio signals using microcontrollers allowed pseudo-Doppler direction finders to take over most of the radiogoniometer's remaining roles from the 1980s. In spite of seeing little use today, the original antennae of BTDF systems can still be seen on many ships and boats.

== History ==
=== Early RDF ===
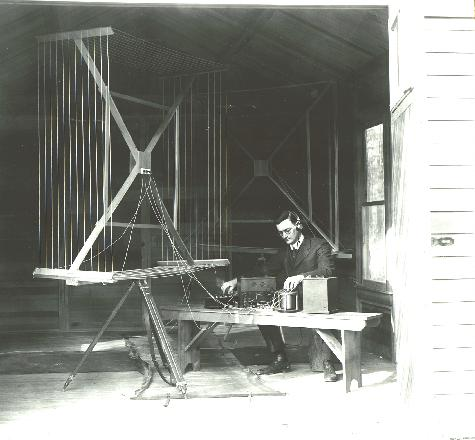
Early RDF systems used large rotating loop antennae built on wooden frames. This 1919 example, from the National Bureau of Standards, is relatively small for the era.

The earliest experiments in RDF were carried out in 1888 when Heinrich Hertz discovered the directionality of an open loop of wire used as an antenna. He noticed that the spark generated at the open gap between the ends of the loop was much stronger when the loop was end-on to the transmitter, and disappeared entirely when it was aligned face-on to the transmitter.

By the early 1900s, many experimenters were looking for ways to use this concept for locating the position of a transmitter. Early radio systems generally used longwave or medium wave signals. Longwave, in particular, had good long-distance transmission characteristics due to their limited interaction with the ground, and thereby provided excellent great circle route ground wave propagation that pointed directly to the transmitter. Methods of performing RDF on longwave signals was a major area of research during the 1900s and 1910s. (Note: Keen lists a number of early experiments where inventors were well on the way to introducing very practical systems, even in advance of those deployed, but then ended development for no obvious reason.)

Antennae are generally sensitive to signals only when they have a length that is a significant portion of the wavelength, or larger. A common example is the half-wave dipole. For longwave use, this resulted in loop antennae tens of feet on a side, often with more than one loop connected together to improve the signal. This presented a significant problem in arranging for the antenna to be rotated. The US Navy overcame this problem, to a point, by mounting long antennae on ships and sailing in circles.

One solution to this problem was developed by the Marconi company in 1905. This consisted of a number of long horizontal wires or rods arranged to point outward from a common center point. A movable switch could connect opposite pairs of these wires to form a dipole, and by rotating the switch the operator could hunt for the strongest signal. All of these systems were unwieldily and impractical for many uses.

=== Bellini–Tosi ===
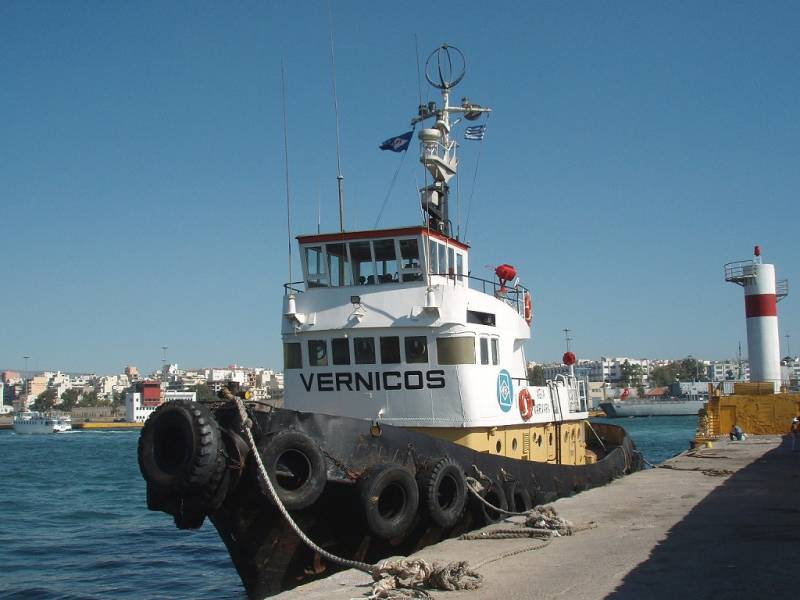
The crossed-loops DF antenna atop the mast of a tug boat. These would be used with a B–T radiogoniometer for navigation by taking measurements against shore-side transmitters.

During experiments in 1907, (Note: The date varies among references, 1906, 1907 and 1909 are all mentioned. The later is the date of the US patent application.) Ettore Bellini and Alessandro Tosi noticed that they could cause the received signal to be re-radiated by forming a loop with multiple winds of wire. Using two loop antennae arranged at right angles and two sets of these small wire coils arranged the same way, the directional properties of the original radio signal were re-created. Direction finding could then be carried out with a conventional loop antenna placed in the center of these two stators (or field coils); the rotating loop was known as the rotor (or sense coil).

Since the field coils were connected to the antennae electrically, they could be placed anywhere, and their size was independent of the wavelength. This meant that RDF could now be performed on longest wavelengths with ease, using antennae of any size. For longwave use, the two crossed antennae could be easily built by running four wires from a single mast to the ground to form triangular shapes. When used with shorter wavelengths, the system of two crossed loop antennae proved to be more mechanically robust than a single rotating one. They had the added advantage that the antennae could be placed almost anywhere; earlier systems often included some sort of remote operation through a mechanical linkage, but this limited the placement of the antenna or receiver room.

The pair sold the patents to the Marconi Company in February 1912, and Bellini joined the company to continue development. This was followed almost immediately with test deployments. However, the total signal sent end-to-end was tiny, and the un-amplified system could only be used with powerful signals. Early experiments carried out aboard Eskimo and Royal George, as well as the RMS Mauretania were successful, but the range was limited to about 15 miles (24 km). In testing on the USS Wyoming, the US Navy found that the ship's own magnetism overwhelmed the signal produced from the sense coils, producing an output that suggested the transmitter was always in front of the ship.

=== Adding amplifiers ===
The B–T system was introduced around the same time as the first triodes, and the Marconi partnership took place in the same year that the triode's ability to amplify signals was first noticed. By 1920, the use of amplifiers in radio was widespread.

Triode amplifiers allowed weak signals to be detected at a greater distance.

=== Adcock antennae ===
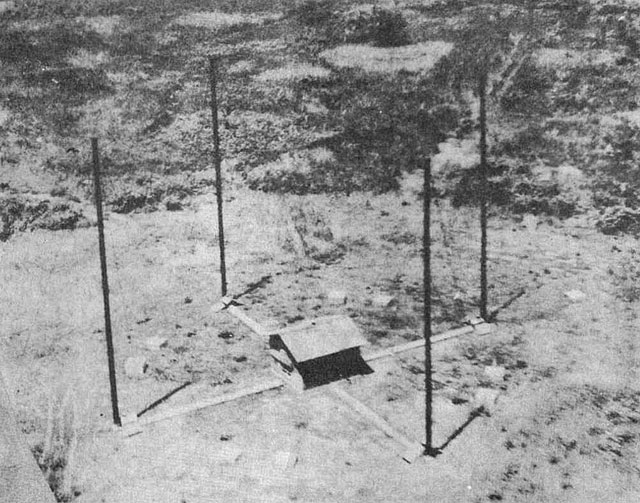
This Japanese BTDF installation at Rabaul was used with signals up to about 2 MHz.The diagonal spacing of the unipoles is 90 feet.

During the 1910s and early 1920s a number of researchers discovered that shorter wavelength signals were reflected off what would later be known as the ionosphere. This allowed the signal to hop over very long distances by reflecting multiple times off the ground and ionosphere. This greatly extended range, allowing lower power transmitters to be used for very long-range communications. By 1923 a number of amateur radio operators (hams) demonstrated excellent performance at 100 m and started routine trans-Atlantic communications the next year. This led to a number of new frequency bands being defined in this shortwave region, as short as 10 m (which is very long by today's standards). By 1930 these frequencies were in widespread use for many purposes.

Shortwave signals presented a problem for RDF because the skywave signal can be simultaneously received from several different hops, making it appear as if the transmitter is at several different bearings. The solution had already been studied, although not in order to solve this specific problem. In 1917 Frank Adcock was trying to solve the problem of making large antennae suitable for use with the radiogoniometer at even the longest wavelengths. He developed a system using four very tall masts, connected together electrically to form two virtual loops. This eliminated the need to connect the tops of the antennae, which were otherwise difficult to connect together for very large antennae. However, it was later found that the underground connections between the antennae shielded them from skywaves, allowing only the direct-line groundwave to reach the goniometer.

=== Aviation use ===
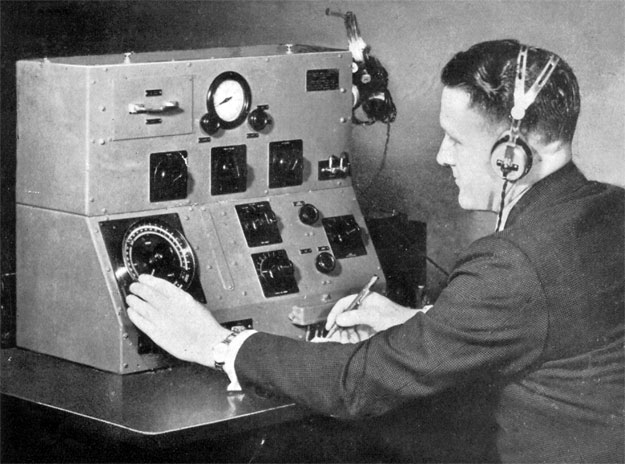
This Marconi B–T receiver was used in Australia for the 1934 MacRobertson Air Race.

Shorter wavelength bands are particularly useful for aviation use. An antenna that broadcast a useful signal at longwave frequencies would be larger than a typical aircraft (although Zeppelins had no problems) and even higher frequencies in the high frequency (HF) and very high frequency (VHF) bands were highly desirable.

The limitations of these frequencies to line-of-sight communications during the day was not a serious issue for air-to-ground use, where the local horizon might be hundreds of miles away for an aircraft flying at even moderate altitudes. A good example of the advantages of shorter wavelengths can be seen on the Supermarine Spitfire, which started WWII with an HF radio that broadcast from a cable antenna stretched from the cockpit to the top of the vertical stabilizer. This provided an average air-to-air range of 5 miles (8.0 km) under ideal conditions. These early TR9D sets were replaced by a VHF set using a small whip antenna offering ranges on the order of 50 miles (80 km), and hundreds miles in the air-to-ground mode.

By the 1930s the use of BTDF for long-range aircraft navigation was common. A good example of such a system was first installed in Australia in 1934 as part of the 11,300 miles (18,200 km) MacRobertson Air Race. Two stations equipped with Marconi BTDF sets and Adcock antennae were set up at Charleville and Melbourne. The success of this system led to additional stations being added to form a network of 17 DF stations for long-distance navigation. By 1945, these had been largely replaced by RDF systems in the aircraft, rather than the ground.

=== Military use ===
The B–T system was also widely used by military forces to determine the location of enemy radio broadcasters. This required some time to perform, often on the order of several minutes for a good fix. This led to various systems to speed the broadcast of messages to make such operations difficult. An example was the German Navy's Kurzsignale code system which condensed messages into short codes, and the fully automated burst encoding Kurier system that sent a Kurzsignale in only ½ a second.

=== Replacement ===
The manual Bellini–Tosi system remained almost universal through WWII except in UK and US service.

In the US, a system originally developed by the French ITT laboratories was widely used. The ITT team fled France in front of the German invasion and destroyed their equipment before leaving. They were able to quickly duplicate their efforts once reaching the US. This system used a motor to quickly spin a radiogoniometer, as well as providing an input to electronics that spun the X and Y inputs of a cathode ray tube (CRT). This caused the signal to trace out a pattern on the display that could be used to determine the direction of the transmission almost instantly.

In the UK, the high-frequency direction finding (HFDF or "huff-duff") system largely had displaced BTDF by about 1943. HFDF used balanced amplifiers that fed directly into a CRT to instantly display the direction directly from the incoming signal, requiring no mechanical movement of any sort. This allowed even the most fleeting signals to be captured and located. The display, in spite of operating on entirely different principles, was very similar to the US mechanical system. HFDF was a closely guarded secret, and did not become well known until after the end of the war.

The replacement of ground-based BTDF systems in the aviation role was due primarily to two factors: One was the move to ever-shorter wavelengths, which so shortened the required antennae that RDF could be carried out on a small receive antenna only a few centimetres in length. Since the older, rotating-loop technique was practical at these frequencies, most aircraft used one. The second advance was the introduction of the automatic direction finder (ADF), which completely automated the RDF procedure. Once an ADF system was tuned to a station, either an airway beacon or an AM radio station, they continually moved a pointer to indicate the relative bearing with no further operator involvement.

B–T, and rotating loops of various sorts, continued to be used in the post-war era by civilians. Improvements continued to be made to both systems throughout this period, especially the introduction of solenoids in place of conventional loops in some roles. However, the introduction of the doppler direction finder, and especially the low-cost electronics to implement it, led to the disappearance of the traditional loop systems by the mid-1990s. Doppler systems use fixed antennae, like BTDF, but handle the direction finding via signal processing alone.

== Description ==
=== Antenna directionality ===
Radio signals consist of constantly varying electric and magnetic fields arranged at right angles. When the magnetic field passes a metal object, it will cause the electrons in the metal to begin moving synchronously with the signal. According to Faraday's law of induction, this effect is maximized when the object and field are at right angles to each other (alternately, one can think of the electric field being in-line with the object). Although radio signals will propagate in any orientation, for the signals considered here the propagation is strongly attenuated if the magnetic field is not perpendicular to the ground. For this reason, radio antennae, both broadcaster and receiver, are normally vertical. Such signals are said to be vertically polarized.

When two or more antennae are placed close together, differences in position of the antennae cause the received radio signal to be seen as differences in phase. For instance, if the two antennae are positioned ½ a wavelength apart, a signal approaching along the line between them will have the opposite phase in the two antennae, causing opposite voltages to be induced. If the signal approaches perpendicular to the line, the phase is the same and the voltages will be equal.

If the tops of the antennae are wired together, the net voltage will be zero when the antenna is face-on to the signal, because the voltages in both vertical sections are opposing each other. When the antenna is rotated, the slight difference in phase, and thus induced voltages, will leave a net voltage in the circuit, and current will flow. This is maximized when the antennae are parallel to the transmitter. If one measures the output at all angles as the antennae are rotated with respect to the signal, a figure-eight reception pattern is produced, with a sharp nul point and an extended area of maximum signal.

The loop antenna uses this principle in a convenient and mechanically robust form. For vertically polarized signals, reception on the top and bottom of the loop is very low, (Note: For longwave signals at least, see the text about various problems at other frequencies.) so it has little contribution or effect on the output. So although the antenna is a complete loop, only the vertical sections have any action on the reception and it acts as two separated antennae. To measure the bearing of a transmitter, the loop is spun about its vertical axis until the signal drops to zero, or nulls, which is a much sharper signal that the maximum.

=== B–T concept ===
The Bellini–Tosi system feeds the output voltage of a loop or Adcock antenna into a small coil of wire, the field coil. The varying voltage induced by the received signal causes the wire to re-radiate the same signal. Although as the coil is typically very much smaller than the wavelength and thus has a small antenna factor, the use of many loops of wire in the coil improves the overall signal strength. The total energy radiated by the coil is less than what is received on the antenna, but it broadcasts this into a much smaller physical area, so the flux may be much higher than the original signal.

Two antennae and two field coils are used, both arranged at right angles to each other. The area between the two field coils is filled with an analog of the original signal from the antennae. The sense coil, another loop antenna, is placed in the area between the field coils. Rotating the sense coil in the field coils has the same output as rotating the entire loop antenna in the original field.

Even slight mis-alignment of the two causes a bias in the output, a false null. Since this was fixed as part of the construction of the radiogoniometer, it was simple enough to correct for this simply by moving the pointer. Slip-rings or nuts were commonly used.

=== Coupling error ===
In fact, the resulting field in the coils is not an exact analog of the original. It would be if the field coils consisted of a single loop of wire, but as they actually consist of multiple windings, these are, in effect, small solenoids. The resulting field is then strongest at the edges of the windings, falling (ideally) to zero in the center.

This causes the output signal to rise and fall around the area in the coils. As the B–T system relies on the comparison of signal volumes, this results in a non-uniform output, rising and falling every 45 degrees, eight times around a full circuit. This was known as coupling error or octantal error.

The solution to this problem is to wind the sense coil in two pairs, each displaced from either side of the centerline by 22.5 degrees. This makes the error in one coil the opposite of the other, a condition that remains true around the entire circle. The correction is never perfect, the precise angles had to be experimented with on every radiogoniometer.

=== Antenna tuning ===
In order to work properly, it is important that both antenna circuits be carefully balanced. To start with the antennae have to be identical, with identical electrical properties in the wiring and the lengths of the leads adjusted to be equal. Since the antennae have inductance and capacitance due to their mechanical layout, additional inductors and capacitors are typically inserted into the circuit so that both antennae have the same totals for both. A common technique to dynamically balance the circuit was to feed an external buzzer signal into the antenna inputs and then tune the capacitors until the signal in both was the same.

Even minor changes in the weather, physical layout or even bumping the chassis containing the tunable capacitors can cause the tuning to vary. For this reason a variety of systems were used to decrease the sensitivity of the radiogoniometer to mis-tuning. Primary among these was the aperiodic aerial concept, which described the mechanical layout of the radiogoniometer's internal wiring. By winding the sense coil wiring around a vertical cylinder, and wiring the field coils in a similar arrangement as close as possible to the sense coil, the entire circuit became capacitively coupled. A single tunable capacitor on the output from the sense coil could then be used to tune the entire system.

=== Sense systems ===
One drawback to any DF system using loop antennae is that the antenna is equally sensitive on both the front and the back, so there is always a 180 degree ambiguity in the measurements - the transmitter might be on either side of the antenna. To address this, many DF systems added an additional antenna, the sense antenna (unrelated to the sense coil).

A sense antenna normally consists of a single vertical antenna positioned some distance from the crossed loops, in line with one of the two loops, at a distance about the same as the distance between the two vertical portions of the loop. The sense antenna's output is mixed with the loop it is in-line with, through a switch that allows it to be turned on or off. When switched on, it produces a voltage that suppresses the output of the rear section of the loop, re-enforcing the forward section. The resulting reception pattern is modified from its original figure-8 to a cardioid.

It is also possible to simulate the sense antenna by tapping a feed off the loop it would have been associated with. This is normally accomplished by placing a center tap in the tuning inductor, and then feeding that signal into the circuit as if it were from another antenna. Since the center-tap causes the signal from both vertical sections to be balanced, it creates a signal similar to a single vertical mast. When used with aperiodic windings, the sense circuit has to be wired into the receiver side, along with the tuning capacitor.

=== Transmission systems ===
The directional qualities of the radiogoniometer work in both directions; it can be used to determine the direction of an incoming signal, or change the direction of a transmission. During early experiments, this capability was used to produce a radio signal that swept the sky like a lighthouse beam, allowing conventional radio receivers to determine their location by timing the passage of the signal. A typical solution was to broadcast a specific start signal, often Morse code, to start the sweep, and the slowly sweep a steady signal after that. The operator timed from the end of the start signal to the maximum in the continuous tone, and then divided by the rotation rate to determine the angle.

The advantage of the B–T system in terms of mechanical simplicity was generally difficult to use in this role due to the normally small amount of energy it could tune. Several competing systems were also developed, including omni-directional antennae with motorized wire-mesh reflectors, as well as a Telefunken system that had multiple dipole antennae periodically switched by a large motorized distributor. In the end none of these systems proved very popular, and the success of B–T systems and small moving-loops suitable for higher frequencies used for aircraft communications allowed DF systems to be carried on the vehicles.
