= Doppler radio direction finding =

Method of radio direction finding

Doppler radio direction finding, also known as Doppler DF, is a radio direction-finding method that generates accurate bearing information with minimal electronics. It is best suited to applications in VHF and UHF frequencies and takes only a short time to indicate a direction. This makes it suitable for measuring the location of the vast majority of commercial, amateur, and automated broadcasts. Doppler DF is one of the most widely used direction-finding techniques. Other direction-finding techniques are generally used only for fleeting signals or for longer or shorter wavelengths.

The Doppler DF system uses the Doppler effect to determine whether a moving receiver antenna is approaching or receding from the source. Early systems used antennas mounted on spinning disks to create this motion. In modern systems, the antennas are not moved physically but are instead oriented electronically, by rapidly switching between a set of several antennas. As long as the switching occurs rapidly, the Doppler effect will be strong enough to determine the direction of the signal. This variation is known as pseudo-Doppler DF, or sometimes sequential phase DF. This newer technique is so widely used that it is often the Doppler DF referred to in most references.

== Direction finding ==
Early radio direction finding (RDF) solutions used highly directional antennas with sharp "nulls" in the reception pattern. The operator rotated the antenna, looking for points where the signal either reached a maximum or, more commonly, suddenly disappeared or 'nulled'. A common RDF antenna design is the loop antenna, which is simply a loop of wire with a small gap in the circle, typically arranged to rotate around the vertical axis with the gap at the bottom. Some systems used dipole antennas instead of loops. Before the 1930s, radio signals were generally in the long wave spectrum. For effective reception of these signals, very large antennas are needed. Direction finding with rotating antennas is difficult at these wavelengths due to the required size of the antennas.

A great advance in RDF technique was introduced in the form of the Bellini-Tosi direction finder (B-T) system, which replaced the rotation of the antenna with the rotation of a small coil of wire connected to two non-moving loop antennas. The loop antennas were similar to those used in earlier systems but fixed in position, set at right angles to each other to form a cross-shaped arrangement. Each antenna produced a different output whose relative strengths depend on how close the signal is to either antenna's null. These signals were sent to two coils of wire, the field coils, also arranged at right angles. These re-created the original signals in a much smaller space, about the size of a soda can. By rotating a small loop antenna, the sense coil, in the space between the two crossed field coils, DF could be performed. In effect, it recreated the traditional technique at a much smaller scale, allowing the main antennas to be built at any size.

Robert Watson-Watt introduced the next major advance in direction finding, the high-frequency direction finding system, or HF/DF, also nicknamed "huff-duff". HF/DF also used crossing antennas, often an Adcock antenna, but sent their output to the two channels of an oscilloscope. The relative strengths and phases of the two signals deflected the X and Y locations of the oscilloscope's electron beam by different amounts, causing an ellipse or figure-8 to appear on the screen, with the long axis indicating the direction of the signal. The readout was essentially instantaneous and was able to easily detect even short transmissions. HF/DF was used in about one-quarter of all successful U-boat sinking.

Both of these systems have drawbacks. The Bellini-Tosi system still has moving parts, albeit small ones, but has the more major limitation that it requires the operator to hunt for the signal, which may take several minutes. HF/DF provides a direct and immediate indication of the signal direction, but only at the cost of requiring an oscilloscope or similar display system with an equally fast response time. Both require two closely matched receivers and amplifiers, and often a third for the "sense" antenna if used.

== Doppler effect ==
If one places an antenna on a moving platform like the roof of a truck, the movement of the truck will cause the Doppler effect to shift the frequency of the signal upward as it moves towards the signal, or downward as it moves away. When the truck is driving at right angles to the signal, or not moving at all, there will be no shift. If the truck is driven around a circular track, there will be times when it approaches the signal, moves away from it, or moves at right angles. This will produce a rising and falling frequency shift of the target signal, producing a frequency modulated (FM) signal known as the Doppler sine wave. The FM signal has the same frequency as the rotational speed of the vehicle.

The magnitude of the shift is a function of the wavelength of the signal and the angular velocity of the antenna:

S = (r W)/λ

Where S is the Doppler shift in frequency (Hz), r is the radius of the circle, W is the angular velocity in radians per second, λ is the target wavelength and c is the speed of light in meters per second. Converting to more common units:

To convert Hz to radians per second, multiply by 6.28 (2π)
To convert MHz to Hz, multiply by one million
Approximate the speed of light to be c = 300 × 10^{6} m/s
Eliminating the constants gives (6.28 × 10^{6})/(300 × 10^{6}) = 1/0.02093... ≈ 48

Such that:

S ≈ (r F_{r} F_{c})/ 48

Where F_{r} is the frequency of rotation in Hz and F_{c} is the target frequency in MHz. (Note: Moell was written in 1978 and uses inches for radius, resulting in a conversion constant of 1880, this has been converted to meters for modern readers by dividing by ~39 in/m.)

Consider the example of a truck hunting an FM radio station at 101.5 MHz, while driving around a 100 metres (330 ft) wide pad (50 metres (160 ft) radius) at 25 kilometres per hour (16 mph). The circumference of the pad is 2π × 50 m or 314 m, and its velocity is 25 km/h = 25 × 1000 m/km / 60 h/min / 60 min/s ≈ 7 m/s, so the truck completes one circuit in 314 / 7 = 45 s. F_{r} is therefore 1/45. Feeding that into the formula above, the frequency shift is:

S = (50 × 0.0222... × 101.8)/ 48 = 2.4 Hz

This amount of frequency shift is too small to be accurately measured. To improve detection odds, r × W must be increased. For this reason, Doppler DF systems normally mount their antennas on a small disk that is spun at a high speed using an electric motor. Performing the same calculation using an antenna mounted to a disk with a diameter of 50 centimetres (20 in) diameter spinning at 1000 Hz results in:

S = (.25 × 1000 × 101.8)/ 48 = 530 Hz

Which is easily detected. Nevertheless, such a rotation speed, 60,000 rpm, demands high-precision systems. Because the antennas have to move at very high speeds, this technique is only really useful for higher frequency signals where the antennas can be shorter (Note: For a variety of reasons, radio antennas have to be about 1/2 the length of the wavelength they are trying to receive.) and the higher F_{c} produces a larger dividend.

Early examples of Doppler DF systems date to at least 1941, and they were used in the United Kingdom for hunting out German early warning radars, which operated at 250 MHz in the 1.25-meter band. By 1943, examples were available that worked in the UHF region, used to find the German Würzburg radars operating at 560 MHz.

A significant advantage of this technique is that it requires only a single receiver, amplifier, and the appropriate FM demodulator. In contrast, HF/DF and B-T systems require two closely matched receivers, one for each antenna pair, and often a third for a sense channel. Widespread civilian use of the technique did not start until the introduction of practical circuits for the quadrature detector and phase-locked loop, both introduced after the war, which greatly simplified the reception of FM signals. Its use roughly follows the spread of FM radio, which also used these techniques.

== Pseudo-Doppler ==
To further simplify the system, it is possible to simulate the movement of the antenna with a small amount of additional electronics. This is the pseudo-Doppler direction finding technique.

Consider a pair of omnidirectional antennas receiving a signal from a target transmitter. As the signal propagates past the receiver, the amplitude of the signal at the antennas rises and falls. At long distances from the transmitter, well into the "far field", the wavefronts can be considered to be parallel. If the two antennas are arranged perpendicularly to the target, the phase difference between them is zero, whereas if they are arranged parallel to the line, the phase difference will be a function of the distance between them and the wavelength of the signal.

For this example, consider the two antennas to be located one quarter of the target wavelength apart and aligned parallel to it. If the two antennas were sampled instantaneously, the difference in phase between them would always be the same, 90°. But if one instead switches the input from one antenna to the other, there will always be some inherent delay, during which time the signal continues to move past the two antennas. In this case, if the original sample was taken when the peak of the wavefront was at the nearer antenna and the system then switched to the farther one, the phase difference would not be 90° but somewhat smaller, because the wavefront approached the second antenna during that time.

Now consider a series of such antennas arranged around the circumference of a circle, and a switch that connects to the antennas in turn in a clockwise fashion. If the target signal is at the midnight position, then the phase shift will be increased when the switching is moving "forward" between the seven and eleven o'clock positions and reduced when moving "away", between one and five. When switching between antennas perpendicular to the line to the signal, eleven to one and five to seven, the shift will be a constant value.

The signal from the antennas is sent into a single receiver, resulting in a series of pulses, whose amplitude depends on the phase at the instant of sampling. That signal is then smoothed to produce a sine wave. That sine wave is modulated exactly as it would be in the case of a single moving antenna. In the case of the moving antenna, the frequency shifts because the antenna is moving through the wavefront as it passes, whereas, in the Pseudo-Doppler case, this is accomplished by timing the samples to simulate the movement of a single antenna. The direction to the target transmitter can then be determined in the same fashion as in the moving-antenna case, by comparing the phase of this signal to a reference signal. In this case, the reference is the clock signal triggering the switch.

Because it has no moving parts and can be built using simple electronics, the pseudo-Doppler technique is very popular. Whilst not quite as fast as measuring the HF/DF system, in modern systems, the measurement is so rapid that there is little practical difference between the two techniques. Pseudo-Doppler has a significant advantage in that the antenna system is much simpler, using monopole antennas, and if the switching system is located on the antenna, only a single wire runs back to the receiver, and thus only one amplifier is required. Because this technique is so widely used, it is often referred to simply as Doppler DF, the "Pseudo" rarely being added.

The main disadvantage of the technique is the requirement for more signal processing. Because the "movement" in Pseudo-Doppler proceeds in steps, the resulting signal is not as smooth as it is in the case of a moving antenna. This results in a signal with considerable number of sidebands that have to be filtered out. The switching system also introduces electronic noise, further confusing the output. Modern signal processing can easily reduce these effects to insignificance.
