= Direction finding =

Measurement of the direction from which a received signal was transmitted

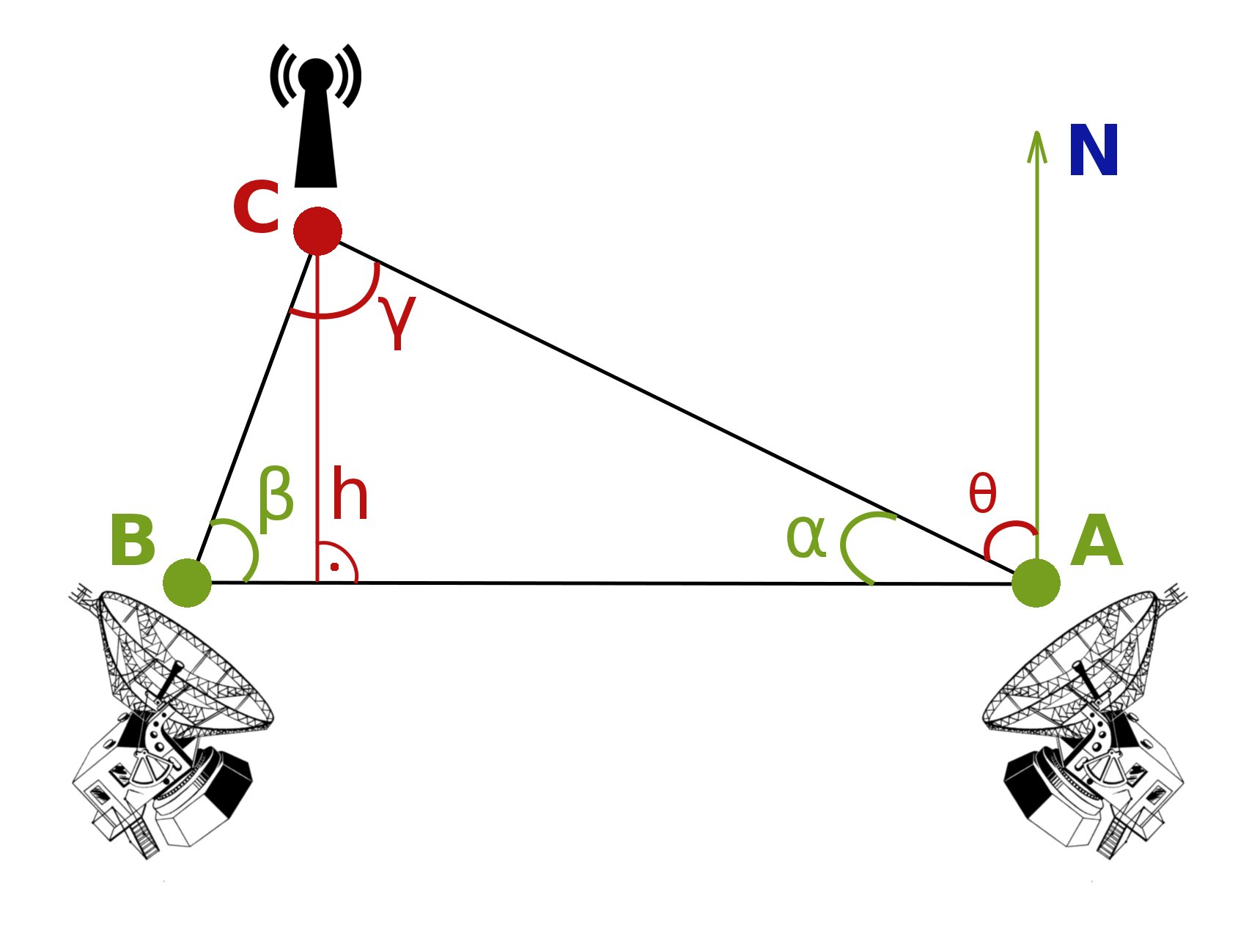
Radiotriangulation scheme using two direction-finding antennas (A and B)

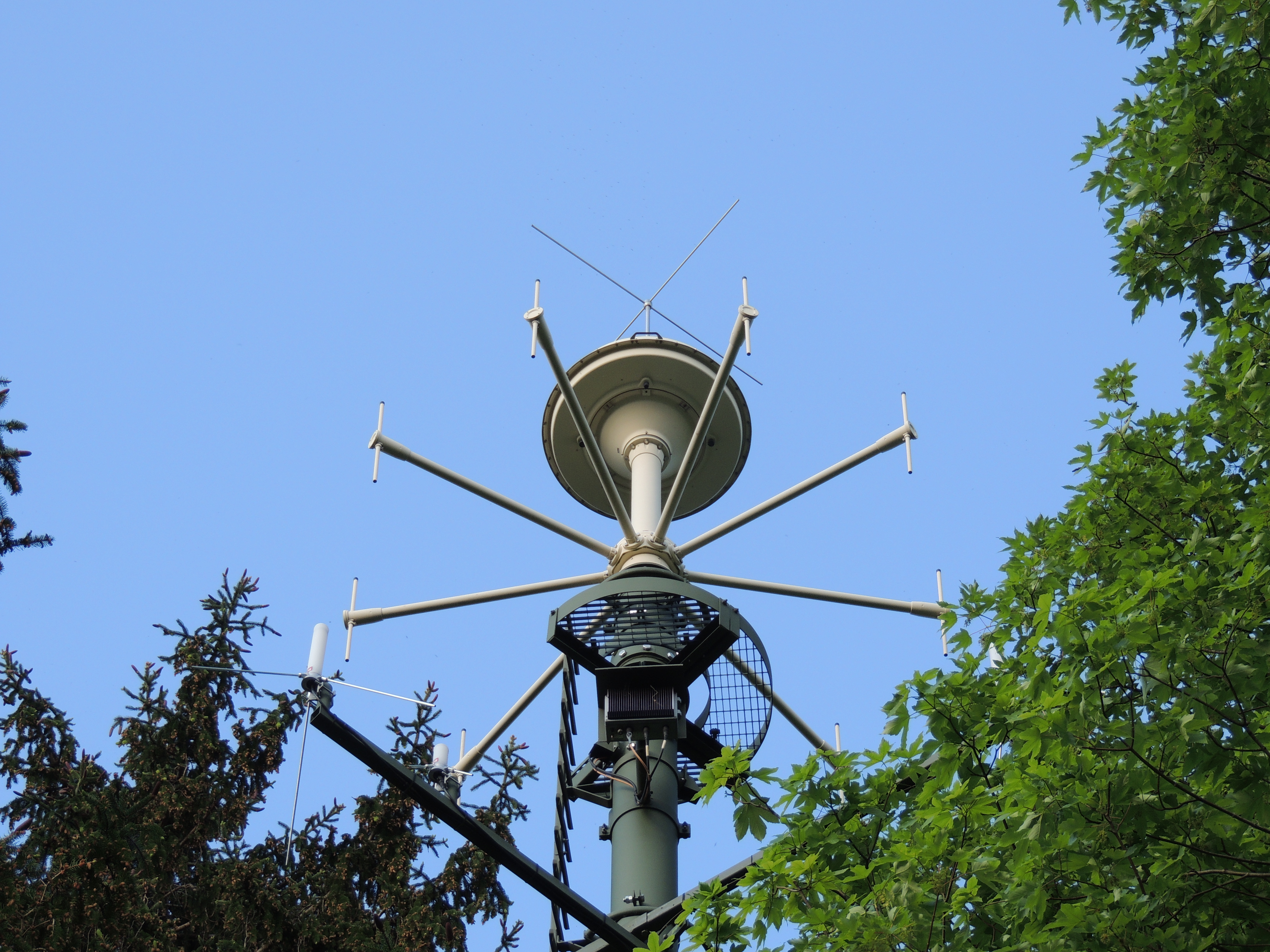
Direction finding antenna near the city of Lucerne, Switzerland

Direction finding (DF), radio direction finding (RDF), or radiogoniometry is the use of radio waves to determine the direction to a radio source. The source may be a cooperating radio transmitter or may be an inadvertent source, a naturally occurring radio source, or an illicit or enemy system. Radio direction finding differs from radar in that only the direction is determined by any one receiver; a radar system usually also gives a distance to the object of interest, as well as direction. By triangulation, the location of a radio source can be determined by measuring its direction from two or more locations. Radio direction finding is used in radio navigation for ships and aircraft, to locate emergency transmitters for search and rescue, for tracking wildlife, and to locate illegal or interfering transmitters. During the Second World War, radio direction finding was used by both sides to locate and direct aircraft, surface ships, and submarines.

RDF systems can be used with any radio source, although very long wavelengths (low frequencies) require very large antennas, and are generally used only on ground-based systems. These wavelengths are nevertheless used for marine radio navigation as they can travel very long distances "over the horizon", which is valuable for ships when the line-of-sight may be only a few tens of kilometres. For aerial use, where the horizon may extend to hundreds of kilometres, higher frequencies can be used, allowing the use of much smaller antennas. An automatic direction finder, which could be tuned to radio beacons called non-directional beacons or commercial AM radio broadcasters, was in the 20th century a feature of most aircraft, but is being phased out.

For the military, RDF is a key tool of signals intelligence. The ability to locate the position of an enemy transmitter has been invaluable since World War I, and played a key role in World War II's Battle of the Atlantic. It is estimated that the UK's advanced "huff-duff" systems were directly or indirectly responsible for 24% of all U-boats sunk during the war. Modern systems often used phased array antennas to allow rapid beamforming for highly accurate results, and are part of a larger electronic warfare suite.

Early radio direction finders used mechanically rotated antennas that compared signal strengths, and several electronic versions of the same concept followed. Modern systems use the comparison of phase or doppler techniques which are generally simpler to automate. Early British radar sets were referred to as RDF, which is often stated was a deception. In fact, the Chain Home systems used large RDF receivers to determine directions. Later radar systems generally used a single antenna for broadcast and reception, and determined direction from the direction the antenna was facing.

== History ==
=== Early mechanical systems ===
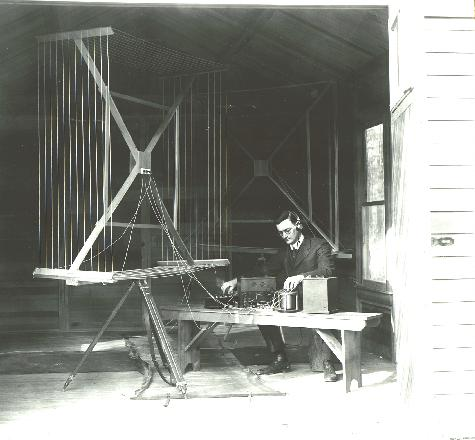
W.G. Wade of the National Bureau of Standards uses a large multi-loop antenna to perform RDF in this 1919 photo. This is a fairly small unit for the era.

The earliest experiments in RDF were carried out in 1888 when Heinrich Hertz discovered the directionality of an open loop of wire used as an antenna. When the antenna was aligned so it pointed at the signal it produced maximum gain, and produced zero signal when face on. This meant there was always an ambiguity in the location of the signal: it would produce the same output if the signal was in front or back of the antenna. Later experimenters also used dipole antennas, which worked in the opposite sense, reaching maximum gain at right angles and zero when aligned. RDF systems using mechanically swung loop or dipole antennas were common by the turn of the 20th century. Prominent examples were patented by John Stone Stone in 1902 (U.S. Patent 716,134) and Lee de Forest in 1904 (U.S. Patent 771,819), among many other examples.

By the early 1900s, many experimenters were looking for ways to use this concept for locating the position of a transmitter. Early radio systems generally used medium wave and longwave signals. Longwave in particular had good long-distance transmission characteristics due to their limited interaction with the ground, and thereby provided excellent great circle route ground wave propagation that pointed directly to the transmitter. Methods of performing RDF on longwave signals was a major area of research during the 1900s and 1910s.

Antennas are generally sensitive to signals only when they have a length that is a significant portion of the wavelength, or larger. Most antennas are at least 1/4 of the wavelength, more commonly 1/2 – the half-wave dipole is a very common design. For longwave use, this resulted in loop antennas tens of feet on a side, often with more than one loop connected together to improve the signal. Another solution to this problem was developed by the Marconi company in 1905. This consisted of a number of horizontal wires or rods arranged to point outward from a common center point. A movable switch could connect opposite pairs of these wires to form a dipole, and by rotating the switch the operator could hunt for the strongest signal. The US Navy overcame this problem, to a point, by mounting antennas on ships and sailing in circles. Such systems were unwieldily and impractical for many uses.

=== Bellini–Tosi ===
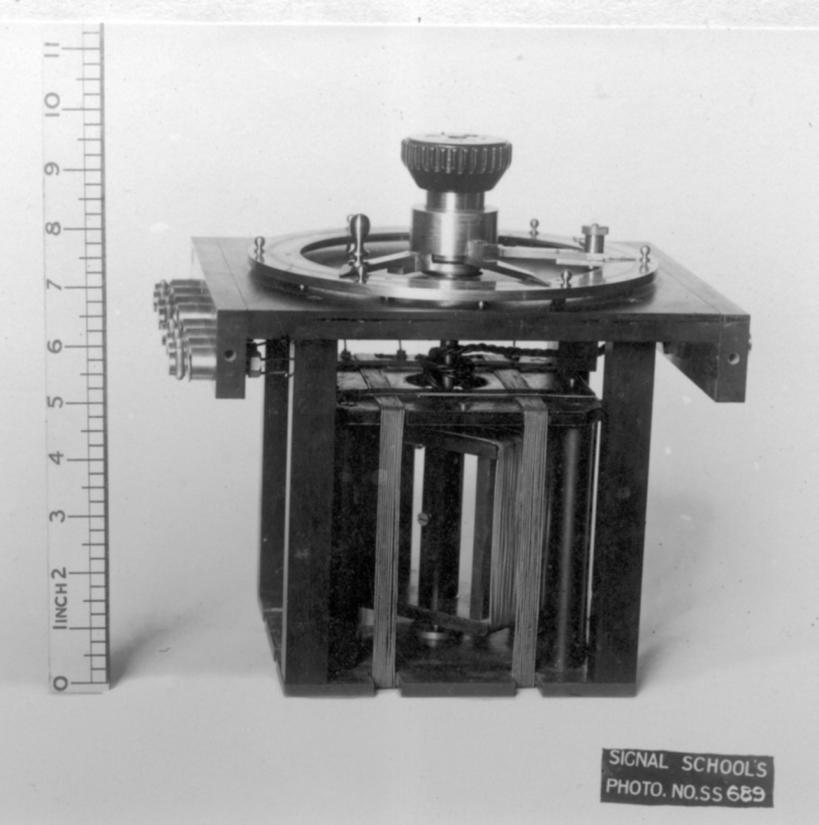
This Royal Navy model is typical of B–T goniometers. The two sets of "field coils" and the rotating "sense coil" are visible.

A key improvement in the RDF concept was introduced by Ettore Bellini and Alessandro Tosi in 1909 (U.S. Patent 943,960). Their system used two such antennas, typically triangular loops, arranged at right angles. The signals from the antennas were sent into coils wrapped around a wooden frame about the size of a drink can, where the signals were re-created in the area between the coils. A separate loop antenna located in this area could then be used to hunt for the direction, without moving the main antennas. This made RDF so much more practical that it was soon being used for navigation on a wide scale, often as the first form of aerial navigation available, with ground stations homing in on the aircraft's radio set. Bellini–Tosi direction finders were widespread from the 1920s into the 1950s.

Early RDF systems were useful largely for long wave signals. These signals are able to travel very long distances, which made them useful for long-range navigation. However, when the same technique was being applied to higher frequencies, unexpected difficulties arose due to the reflection of high frequency signals from the ionosphere. The RDF station might now receive the same signal from two or more locations, especially during the day, which caused serious problems trying to determine the location. This led to the 1919 introduction of the Adcock antenna (UK Patent 130,490), which consisted of four separate monopole antennas instead of two loops, eliminating the horizontal components and thus filtering out the sky waves being reflected down from the ionosphere. Adcock antennas were widely used with Bellini–Tosi detectors from the 1920s on.

The US Army Air Corps in 1931 tested a primitive radio compass that used commercial stations as the beacon.

=== Huff-duff ===
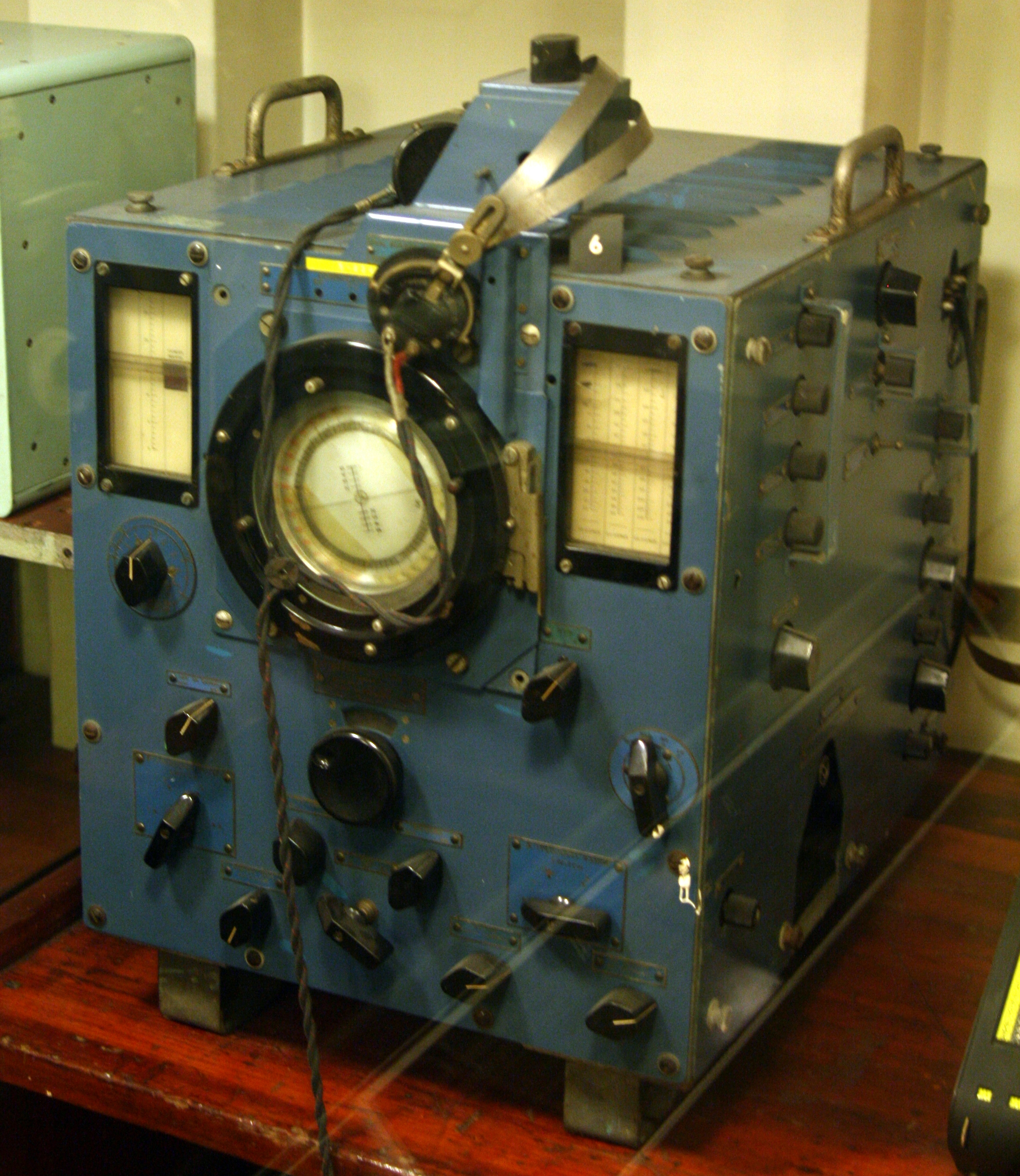
FH4 "Huff-duff" equipment on the museum ship HMS Belfast

A major improvement in the RDF technique was introduced by Robert Watson-Watt as part of his experiments to locate lightning strikes as a method to indicate the direction of thunderstorms for sailors and airmen. He had long worked with conventional RDF systems, but these were difficult to use with the fleeting signals from the lightning. He had early on suggested the use of an oscilloscope to display these near instantly, but was unable to find one while working at the Met Office. When the office was moved, his new location at a radio research station provided him with both an Adcock antenna and a suitable oscilloscope, and he presented his new system in 1926.

In spite of the system being presented publicly, and its measurements widely reported in the UK, its impact on the art of RDF seems to be strangely subdued. Development was limited until the mid-1930s, when the various British forces began widespread development and deployment of these "high-frequency direction finding", or "huff-duff" systems. To avoid RDF, the Germans had developed a method of broadcasting short messages under 30 seconds, less than the 60 seconds that a trained Bellini-Tosi operator would need to determine the direction. However, this was useless against huff-duff systems, which located the signal with reasonable accuracy in seconds. The Germans did not become aware of this problem until the middle of the war, and did not take any serious steps to address it until 1944. By that time huff-duff had helped in about one-quarter of all successful attacks on the U-boat fleet.

=== Post-war systems ===
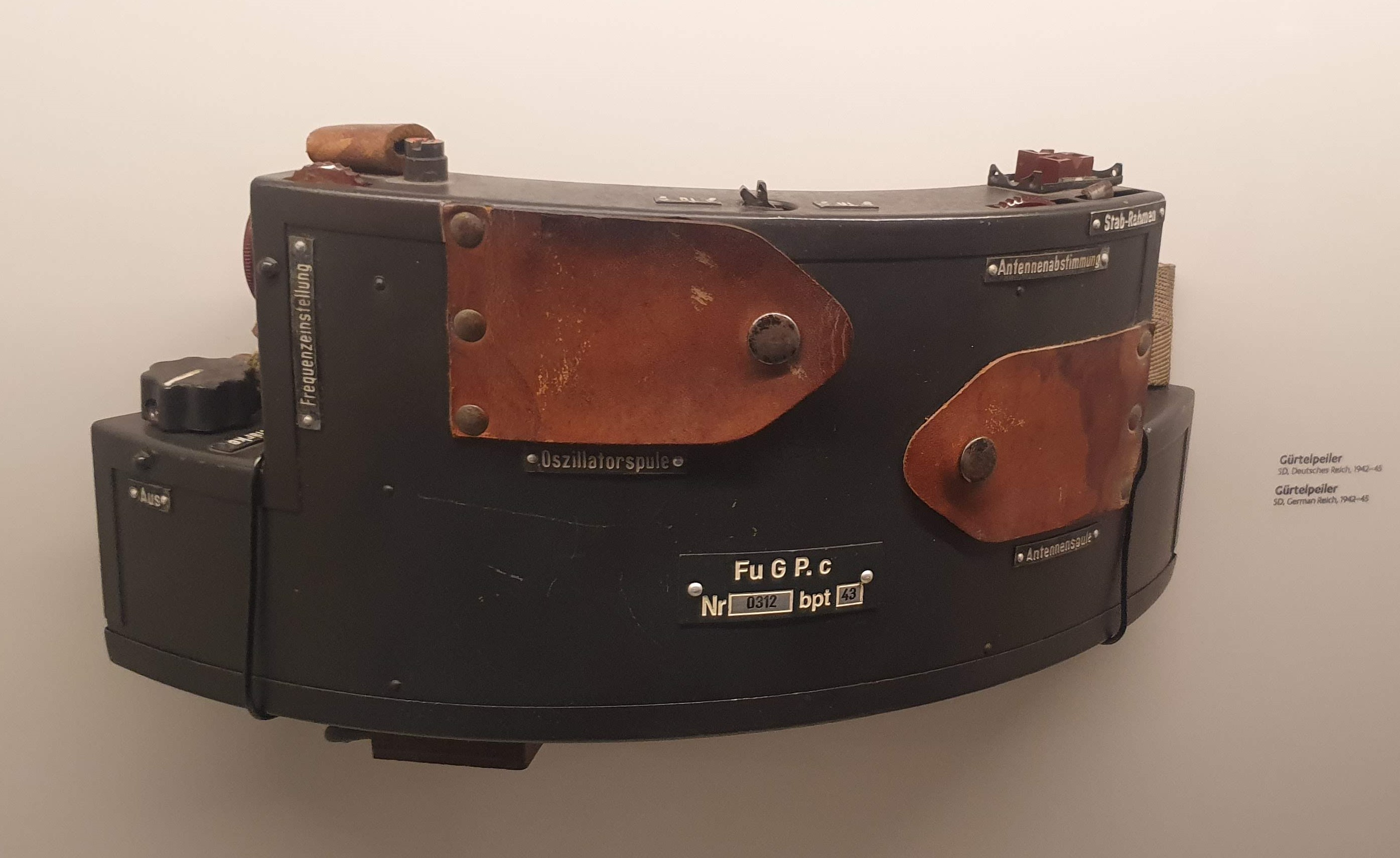
Belt beacon (Serial No .:0312, Production No .:bpt, Year of manufacture: 1943) portable radio direction finder.

Several developments in electronics during and after the Second World War led to greatly improved methods of comparing the phase of signals. In addition, the phase-locked loop (PLL) allowed for easy tuning in of signals, which would not drift. Improved vacuum tubes and the introduction of the transistor allowed much higher frequencies to be used economically, which led to widespread use of VHF and UHF signals. All of these changes led to new methods of RDF, and its much more widespread use.

In particular, the ability to compare the phase of signals led to phase-comparison RDF, which is perhaps the most widely used technique today. In this system the loop antenna is replaced with a single square-shaped ferrite core, with loops wound around two perpendicular sides. Signals from the loops are sent into a phase comparison circuit, whose output phase directly indicates the direction of the signal. By sending this to any manner of display, and locking the signal using PLL, the direction to the broadcaster can be continuously displayed. Operation consists solely of tuning in the station, and is so automatic that these systems are normally referred to as automatic direction finder.

Other systems have been developed where more accuracy is required. Pseudo-doppler radio direction finder systems use a series of small dipole antennas arranged in a ring and use electronic switching to rapidly select dipoles to feed into the receiver. The resulting signal is processed and produces an audio tone. The phase of that audio tone, compared to the antenna rotation, depends on the direction of the signal. Doppler RDF systems have widely replaced the huff-duff system for location of fleeting signals.

=== 21st century ===
The various procedures for radio direction finding to determine position at sea are no longer part of the maritime safety system GMDSS, which has been in force since 1999. The striking cross frame antenna with attached auxiliary antenna can only be found on the signal masts of some older ships because they do not interfere there and dismantling would be too expensive.

Modern positioning methods such as GPS, DGPS, radar and the now-outdated Loran C have radio direction finding methods that are imprecise for today's needs.

Radio direction finding networks also no longer exist. However rescue vessels, such as RNLI lifeboats in the UK, and Search and Rescue helicopters have direction finding receivers for marine VHF signals and the 121.5 MHz homing signals incorporated in EPIRB and PLB beacons, although modern GPS-EPIRBS and AIS beacons are slowly making these redundant.

== Equipment ==
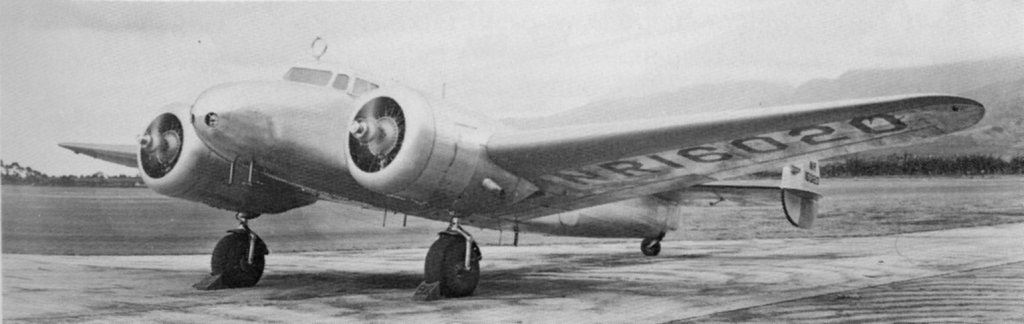
Amelia Earhart's Lockheed Model 10 Electra with the circular RDF aerial visible above the cockpit

A radio direction finder (RDF) is a device for finding the direction, or bearing, to a radio source. The act of measuring the direction is known as radio direction finding or sometimes simply direction finding (DF). Using two or more measurements from different locations, the location of an unknown transmitter can be determined; alternately, using two or more measurements of known transmitters, the location of a vehicle can be determined. RDF is widely used as a radio navigation system, especially with boats and aircraft.

RDF systems can be used with any radio source, although the size of the receiver antennas are a function of the wavelength of the signal; very long wavelengths (low frequencies) require very large antennas, and are generally used only on ground-based systems. These wavelengths are nevertheless very useful for marine navigation as they can travel very long distances and "over the horizon", which is valuable for ships when the line-of-sight may be only a few tens of kilometres. For aircraft, where the horizon at altitude may extend to hundreds of kilometres, higher frequencies can be used, allowing much smaller antennas. An automatic direction finder, often capable of being tuned to commercial AM radio transmitters, is a feature of almost all modern aircraft.

For the military, RDF systems are a key component of signals intelligence systems and methodologies. The ability to locate the position of an enemy transmitter has been invaluable since World War I, and it played a key role in World War II's Battle of the Atlantic. It is estimated that the UK's advanced "huff-duff" systems were directly or indirectly responsible for 24% of all U-boats sunk during the war. Modern systems often use phased array antennas to allow rapid beam forming for highly accurate results. These are generally integrated into a wider electronic warfare suite.

Several distinct generations of RDF systems have been used over time, following new developments in electronics. Early systems used mechanically rotated antennas that compared signal strengths from different directions, and several electronic versions of the same concept followed. Modern systems use the comparison of phase or doppler techniques which are generally simpler to automate. Modern pseudo-Doppler direction finder systems consist of a number of small antennas fixed to a circular card, with all of the processing performed by software.

Early British radar sets were also referred to as RDF, which was a deception tactic. However, the terminology was not inaccurate; the Chain Home systems used separate omnidirectional broadcasters and large RDF receivers to determine the location of the targets.

=== Antennas ===
In one type of direction finding, a directional antenna is used which is more sensitive in certain directions than in others. Many antenna designs exhibit this property. For example, a Yagi antenna has quite pronounced directionality, so the source of a transmission can be determined by pointing it in the direction where the maximum signal level is obtained. Since the directional characteristics can be very broad, large antennas may be used to improve precision, or null techniques used to improve angular resolution.

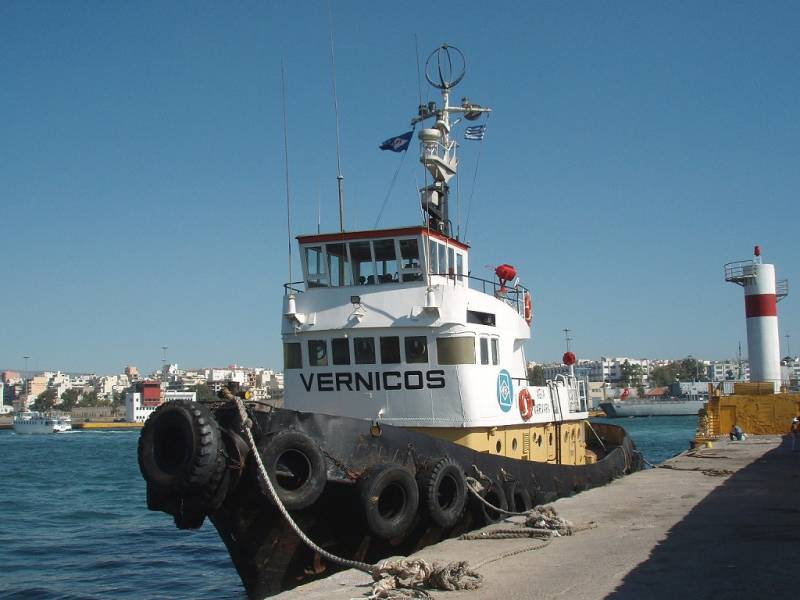
The crossed-loops antenna atop the mast of a tug boat is a direction-finding design.

==== Null finding with loop antennas ====
A simple form of directional antenna is the loop aerial. This consists of an open loop of wire on an insulating frame, or a metal ring that forms the antenna's loop element itself; often the diameter of the loop is a tenth of a wavelength or smaller at the target frequency. Such an antenna will be least sensitive to signals that are perpendicular to its face and most responsive to those arriving edge-on. This is caused by the phase of the received signal: The difference in electrical phase along the rim of the loop at any instant causes a difference in the voltages induced on either side of the loop.

Turning the plane of the loop to "face" the signal so that the arriving phases are identical around the entire rim will not induce any current flow in the loop. So simply turning the antenna to produce a minimum in the desired signal will establish two possible directions (front and back) from which the radio waves could be arriving. This is called a null in the signal, and it is used instead of the strongest signal direction, because small angular deflections of the loop aerial away from its null positions produce much more abrupt changes in received current than similar directional changes around the loop's strongest signal orientation. Since the null direction gives a clearer indication of the signal direction – the null is "sharper" than the max – with loop aerial the null direction is used to locate a signal source.

A "sense antenna" is used to resolve the two direction possibilities; the sense aerial is a non-directional antenna configured to have the same sensitivity as the loop aerial. By adding the steady signal from the sense aerial to the alternating signal from the loop signal as it rotates, there is now only one position as the loop rotates 360° at which there is zero current. This acts as a phase reference point, allowing the correct null point to be identified, removing the 180° ambiguity. A dipole antenna exhibits similar properties, as a small loop, although its null direction is not as "sharp".

==== Yagi antenna for higher frequencies ====
The Yagi-Uda antenna is familiar as the common VHF or UHF television aerial. A Yagi antenna uses multiple dipole elements, which include "reflector" and "director" dipole elements. The "reflector" is the longest dipole element and blocks nearly all the signal coming from behind it, hence a Yagi has no front vs. back directional ambiguity: The maximum signal only occurs when the narrowest end of the Yagi is aimed in the direction from which the radio waves are arriving. With a sufficient number of shorter "director" elements, a Yagi's maximum direction can be made to approach the sharpness of a small loop's null.

==== Parabolic antennas for extremely high frequencies ====
For much higher frequencies still, such as millimeter waves and microwaves, parabolic antennas or "dish" antennas can be used. Dish antennas are highly directional, with the parabolic shape directing received signals from a very narrow angle into a small receiving element mounted at the focus of the parabola.

==== Electronic analysis of two antennas' signals ====
More sophisticated techniques such as phased arrays are generally used for highly accurate direction finding systems. The modern systems are called goniometers by analogy to WW II directional circuits used to measure direction by comparing the differences in two or more matched reference antennas' received signals, used in old signals intelligence (SIGINT). A modern helicopter-mounted direction finding system was designed by ESL Incorporated for the U.S. Government as early as 1972.

Time difference of arrival techniques compare the arrival time of a radio wave at two or more different antennas and deduce the direction of arrival from this timing information. This method can use mechanically simple non-moving omnidirectional antenna elements fed into a multiple channel receiver system.

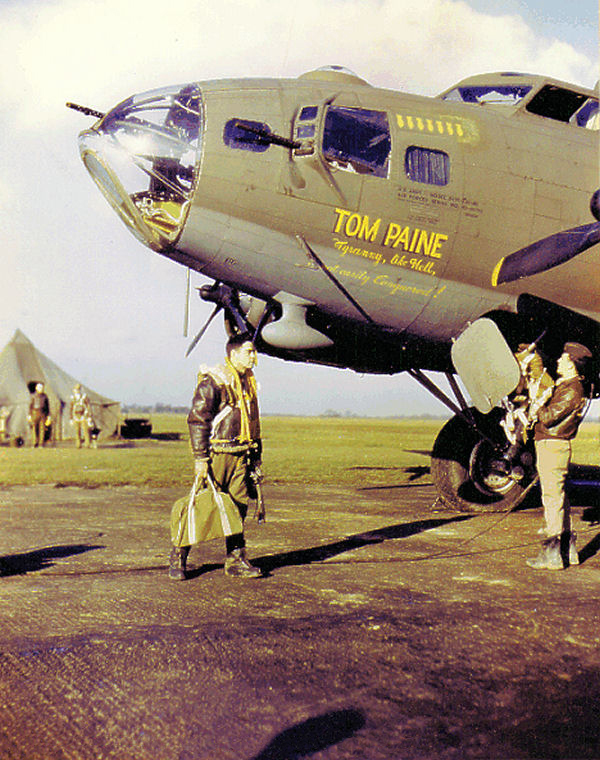
The RDF antenna on this B-17F is located in the prominent teardrop housing under the nose.

=== Operation ===
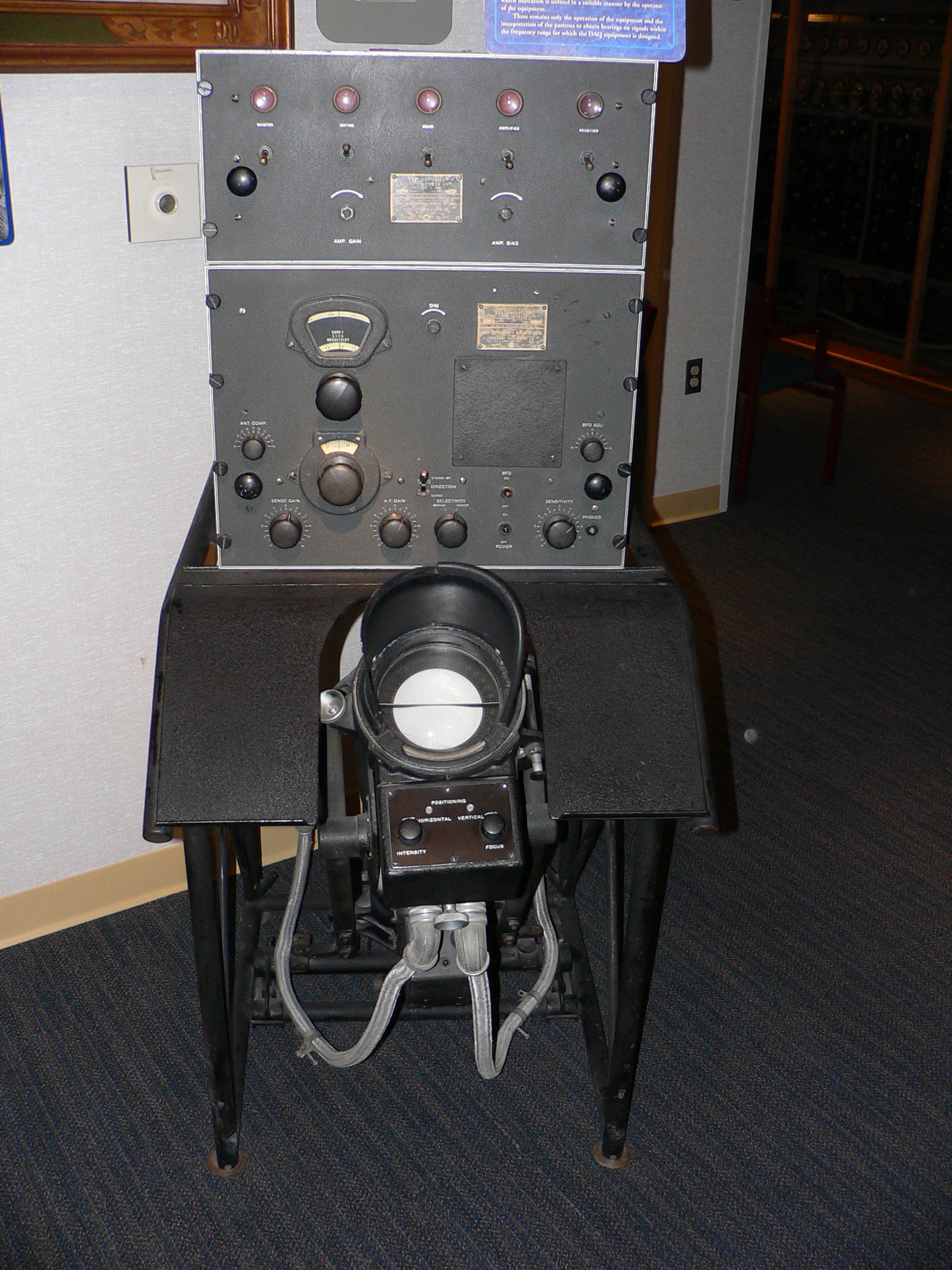
World War II US Navy high frequency radio direction finder

One form of radio direction finding works by comparing the signal strength of a directional antenna pointing in different directions. At first, this system was used by land and marine-based radio operators, using a simple rotatable loop antenna linked to a degree indicator. This system was later adopted for both ships and aircraft, and was widely used in the 1930s and 1940s. On pre-World War II aircraft, RDF antennas are easy to identify as the circular loops mounted above or below the fuselage. Later loop antenna designs were enclosed in an aerodynamic, teardrop-shaped fairing. In ships and small boats, RDF receivers first employed large metal loop antennas, similar to aircraft, but usually mounted atop a portable battery-powered receiver.

In use, the RDF operator would first tune the receiver to the correct frequency, then manually turn the loop, either listening or watching an S meter to determine the direction of the null (the direction at which a given signal is weakest) of a long wave (LW) or medium wave (AM) broadcast beacon or station (listening for the null is easier than listening for a peak signal, and normally produces a more accurate result). This null was symmetrical, and thus identified both the correct degree heading marked on the radio's compass rose as well as its 180-degree opposite. While this information provided a baseline from the station to the ship or aircraft, the navigator still needed to know beforehand if he was to the east or west of the station in order to avoid plotting a course 180-degrees in the wrong direction. By taking bearings to two or more broadcast stations and plotting the intersecting bearings, the navigator could locate the relative position of his ship or aircraft.

Later, RDF sets were equipped with rotatable ferrite loopstick antennas, which made the sets more portable and less bulky. Some were later partially automated by means of a motorized antenna (ADF). A key breakthrough was the introduction of a secondary vertical whip or 'sense' antenna that substantiated the correct bearing and allowed the navigator to avoid plotting a bearing 180 degrees opposite the actual heading. The U.S. Navy RDF model SE 995 which used a sense antenna was in use during World War I. After World War II, there were many small and large firms making direction finding equipment for mariners, including Apelco, Aqua Guide, Bendix, Gladding (and its marine division, Pearce-Simpson), Ray Jefferson, Raytheon, and Sperry. By the 1960s, many of these radios were actually made by Japanese electronics manufacturers, such as Panasonic, Fuji Onkyo, and Koden Electronics Co., Ltd. In aircraft equipment, Bendix and Sperry-Rand were two of the larger manufacturers of RDF radios and navigation instruments.

=== Single-channel DF ===
Single-channel DF uses a multi-antenna array with a single channel radio receiver. This approach to DF offers some advantages and drawbacks. Since it only uses one receiver, mobility and lower power consumption are benefits. Without the ability to look at each antenna simultaneously (which would be the case if one were to use multiple receivers, also known as N-channel DF) more complex operations need to occur at the antenna in order to present the signal to the receiver.

The two main categories that a single channel DF algorithm falls into are amplitude comparison and phase comparison. Some algorithms can be hybrids of the two.

==== Pseudo-doppler DF technique ====
The pseudo-doppler technique is a phase based DF method that produces a bearing estimate on the received signal by measuring the doppler shift induced on the signal by sampling around the elements of a circular array. The original method used a single antenna that physically moved in a circle but the modern approach uses a multi-antenna circular array with each antenna sampled in succession.

==== Watson–Watt, or Adcock-antenna array ====
The Watson-Watt technique uses two antenna pairs to perform an amplitude comparison on the incoming signal. The popular Watson-Watt method uses an array of two orthogonal coils (magnetic dipoles) in the horizontal plane, often completed with an omnidirectional vertically polarized electric dipole to resolve 180° ambiguities.

The Adcock antenna array uses a pair of monopole or dipole antennas that takes the vector difference of the received signal at each antenna so that there is only one output from each pair of antennas. Two of these pairs are co-located but perpendicularly oriented to produce what can be referred to as the N–S (North-South) and E–W (East-West) signals that will then be passed to the receiver. In the receiver, the bearing angle can then be computed by taking the arctangent of the ratio of the N–S to E–W signal.

==== Correlative interferometer ====
The basic principle of the correlative interferometer consists in comparing the measured phase differences with the phase differences obtained for a DF antenna system of known configuration at a known wave angle (reference data set). For this, at least three antenna elements (with omnidirectional reception characteristics) must form a non-collinear basis. The comparison is made for different azimuth and elevation values of the reference data set. The bearing result is obtained from a correlative and stochastic evaluation for which the correlation coefficient is at a maximum. If the direction finding antenna elements have a directional antenna pattern, then the amplitude may be included in the comparison.

Typically, the correlative interferometer DF system consists of more than five antenna elements. These are scanned one after the other via a specific switching matrix. In a multi-channel DF system n antenna elements are combined with m receiver channels to improve the DF-system performance.

== Applications ==
=== Radio navigation ===
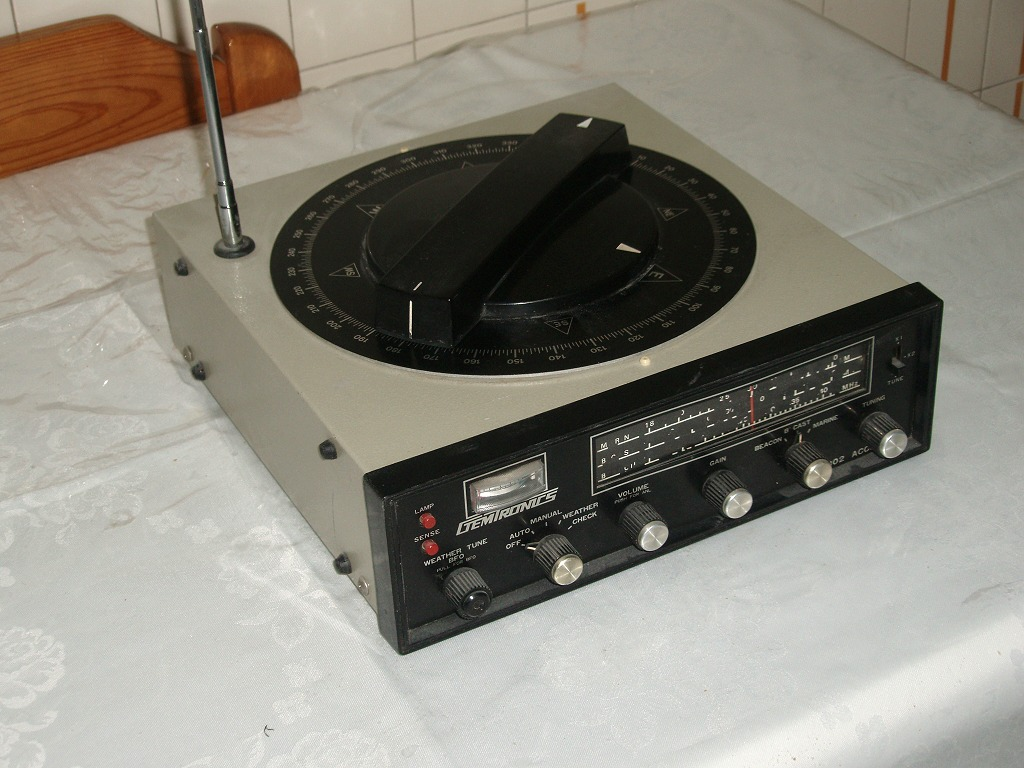
A portable, battery operated GT-302 Accumatic automatic direction finder for marine use

Radio direction finding, radio direction finder, or RDF, was once the primary aviation navigational aid. (Range and Direction Finding was the abbreviation used to describe the predecessor to radar.) Beacons were used to mark "airways" intersections and to define departure and approach procedures. Since the signal transmitted contains no information about bearing or distance, these beacons are referred to as non-directional beacons, or NDB in the aviation world. Starting in the 1950s, these beacons were generally replaced by the VOR system, in which the bearing to the navigational aid is measured from the signal itself; therefore no specialized antenna with moving parts is required. Due to relatively low purchase, maintenance and calibration cost, NDBs are still used to mark locations of smaller aerodromes and important helicopter landing sites.

Similar beacons located in coastal areas are also used for maritime radio navigation, as almost every ship was equipped with a direction finder (Appleyard 1988). Very few maritime radio navigation beacons remain active today (2008) as ships have abandoned navigation via RDF in favor of GPS navigation.

In the United Kingdom a radio direction finding service is available on 121.5 MHz and 243.0 MHz to aircraft pilots who are in distress or are experiencing difficulties. The service is based on a number of radio DF units located at civil and military airports and certain HM Coastguard stations. These stations can obtain a "fix" of the aircraft and transmit it by radio to the pilot.

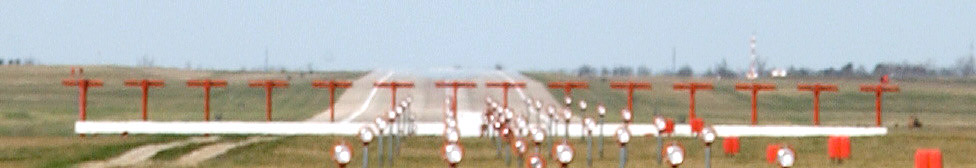
ILS Localizer

==== Maritime and aircraft navigation ====
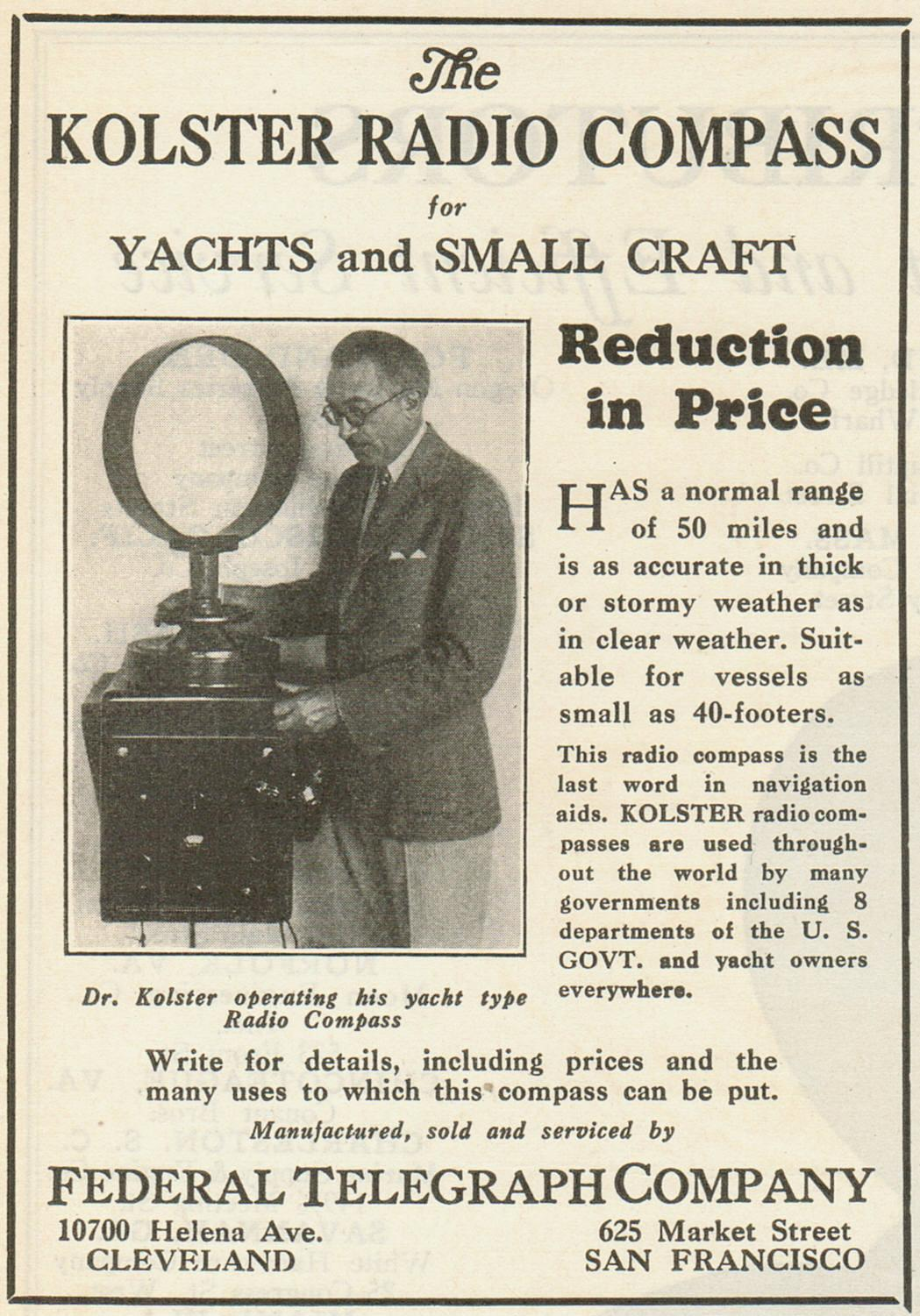
Historic advertisement for Kolster radio compass

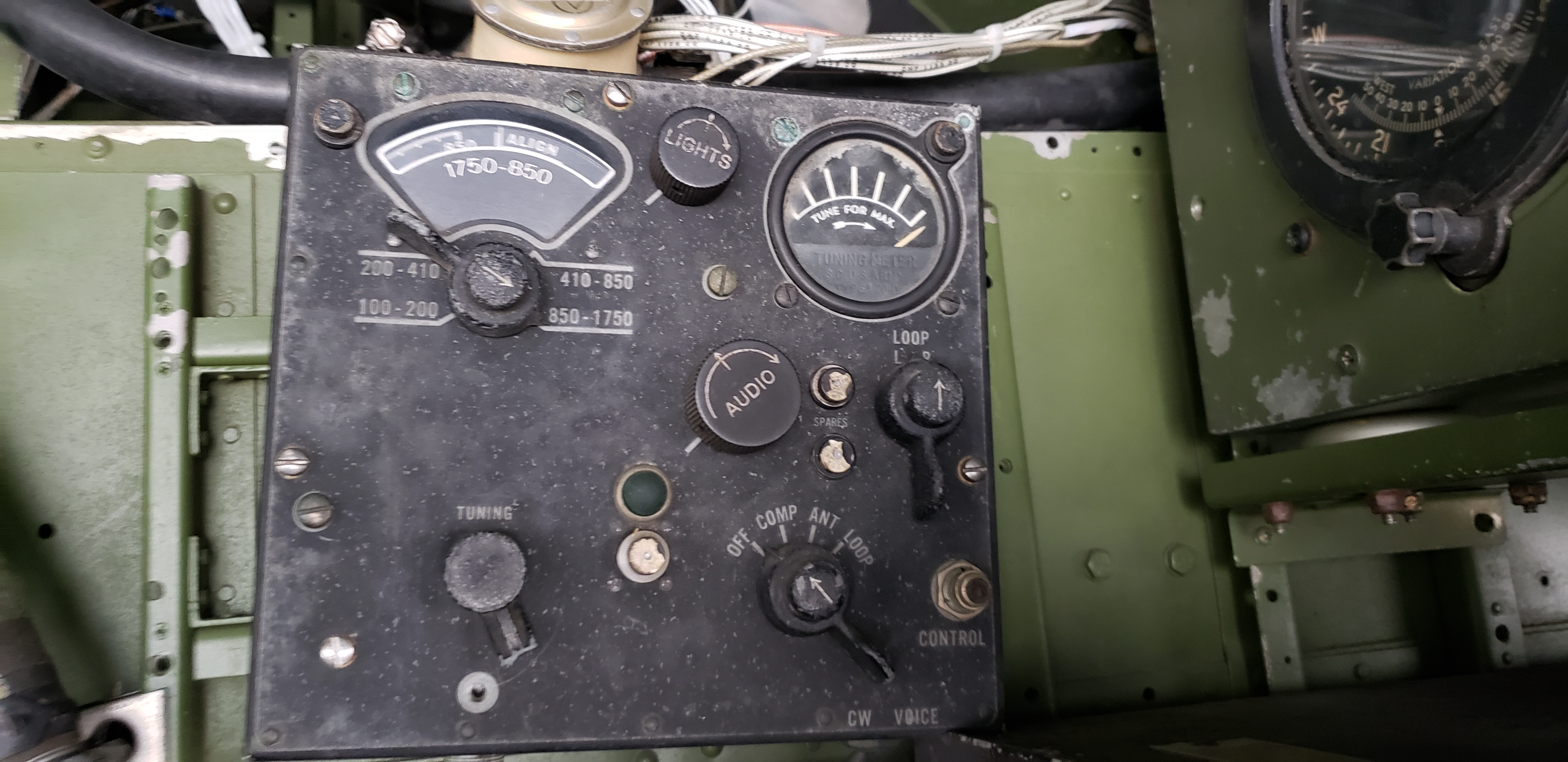
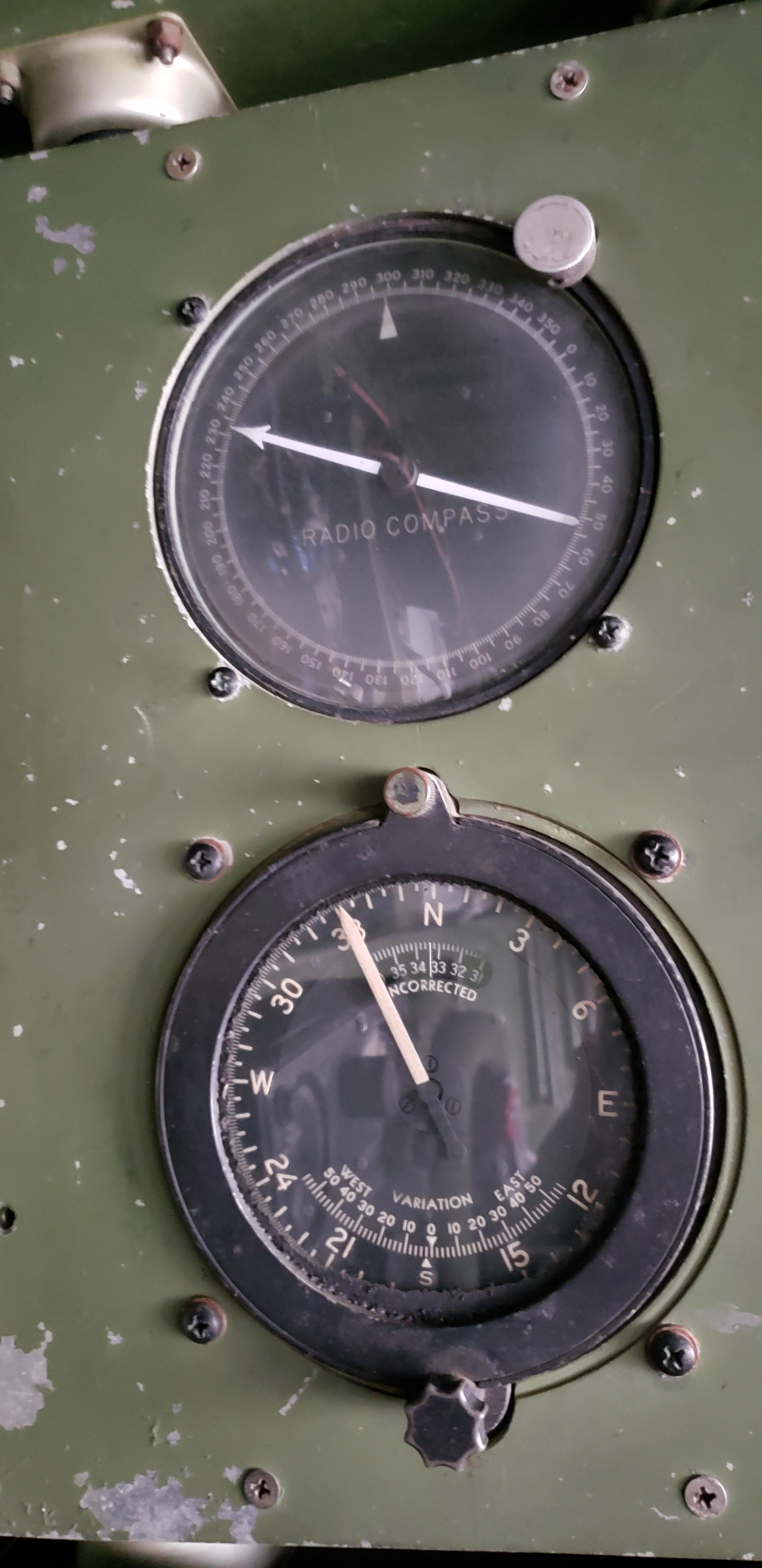
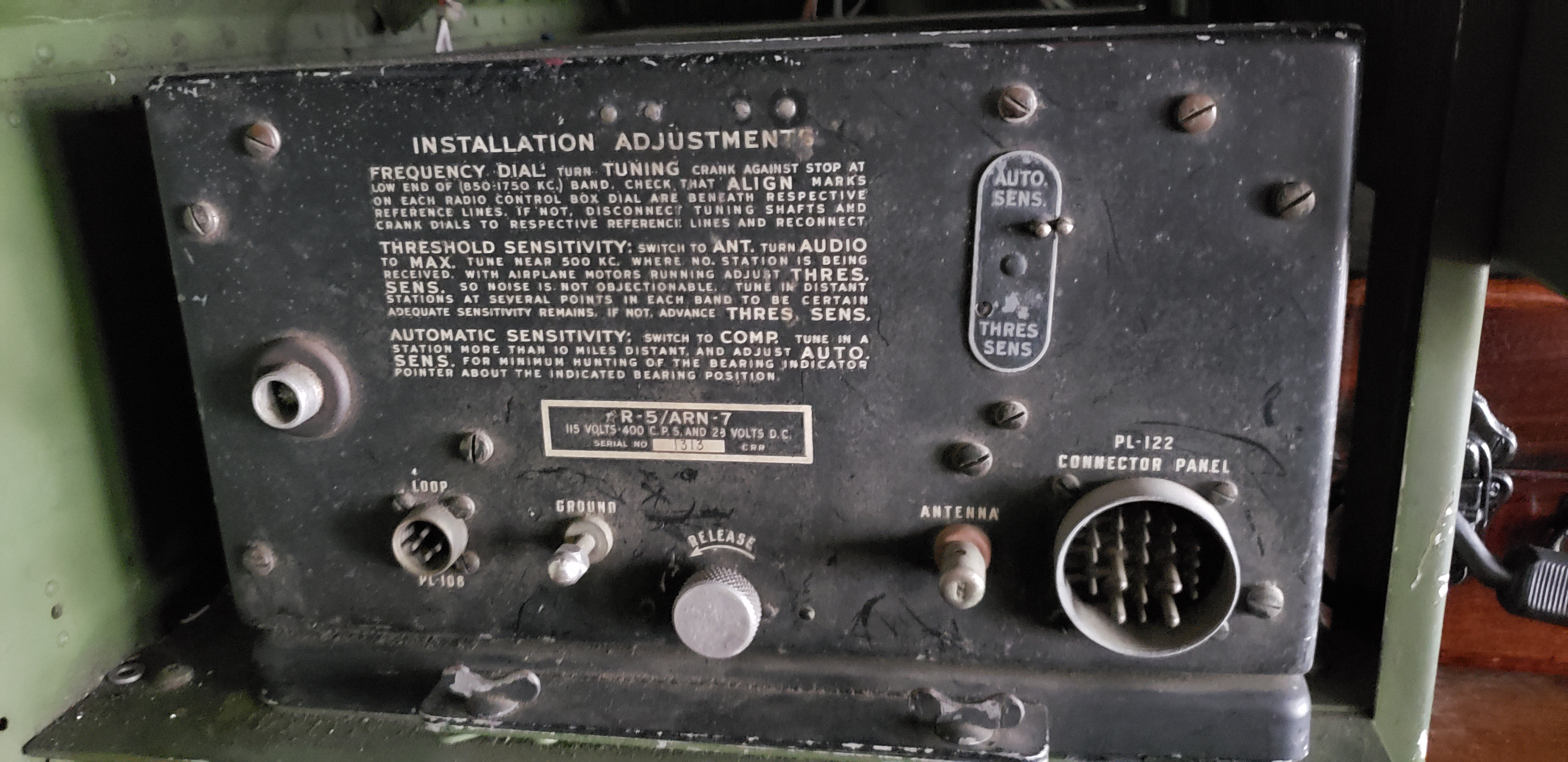
R-5/ARN7 radio compass components, with the radio control box (left), indicator (center), and radio compass unit (right)

Radio transmitters for air and sea navigation are known as beacons and are the radio equivalent to a lighthouse. The transmitter sends a Morse Code transmission on a Long wave (150 – 400 kHz) or Medium wave (520 – 1720 kHz) frequency incorporating the station's identifier that is used to confirm the station and its operational status. Since these radio signals are broadcast in all directions (omnidirectional) during the day, the signal itself does not include direction information, and these beacons are therefore referred to as non-directional beacons, or NDBs.

As the commercial medium wave broadcast band lies within the frequency capability of most RDF units, these stations and their transmitters can also be used for navigational fixes. While these commercial radio stations can be useful due to their high power and location near major cities, there may be several miles between the location of the station and its transmitter, which can reduce the accuracy of the 'fix' when approaching the broadcast city. A second factor is that some AM radio stations are omnidirectional during the day, and switch to a reduced power, directional signal at night.

RDF was once the primary form of aircraft and marine navigation. Strings of beacons formed "airways" from airport to airport, while marine NDBs and commercial AM broadcast stations provided navigational assistance to small watercraft approaching a landfall. In the United States, commercial AM radio stations were required to broadcast their station identifier once per hour for use by pilots and mariners as an aid to navigation. In the 1950s, aviation NDBs were augmented by the VOR system, in which the direction to the beacon can be extracted from the signal itself, hence the distinction with non-directional beacons. Use of marine NDBs was largely supplanted in North America by the development of LORAN in the 1970s.

Today many NDBs have been decommissioned in favor of faster and far more accurate GPS navigational systems. However the low cost of ADF and RDF systems, and the continued existence of AM broadcast stations (as well as navigational beacons in countries outside North America) has allowed these devices to continue to function, primarily for use in small boats, as an adjunct or backup to GPS.

=== Location of illegal, secret or hostile transmitters – SIGINT ===
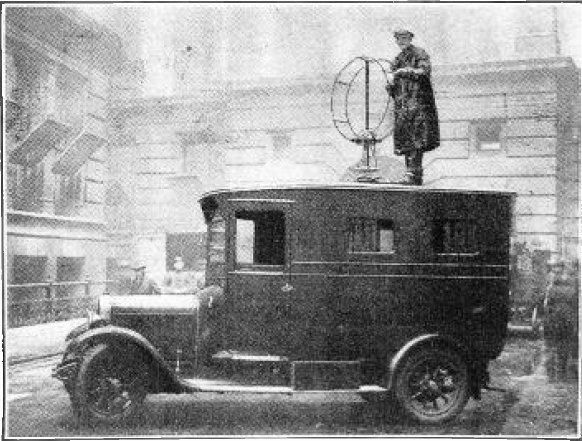
British Post Office RDF lorry from 1927 for finding unlicensed amateur radio transmitters. It was also used to find regenerative receivers which radiated interfering signals due to feedback, a big problem at the time.

In World War II considerable effort was expended on identifying secret transmitters in the United Kingdom (UK) by direction finding. The work was undertaken by the Radio Security Service (RSS also MI8). Initially three U Adcock HF DF stations were set up in 1939 by the General Post Office. With the declaration of war, MI5 and RSS developed this into a larger network. One of the problems with providing coverage of an area the size of the UK was installing sufficient DF stations to cover the entire area to receive skywave signals reflected back from the ionised layers in the upper atmosphere. Even with the expanded network, some areas were not adequately covered and for this reason up to 1700 voluntary interceptors (radio amateurs) were recruited to detect illicit transmissions by ground wave. In addition to the fixed stations, RSS ran a fleet of mobile DF vehicles around the UK. If a transmitter was identified by the fixed DF stations or voluntary interceptors, the mobile units were sent to the area to home in on the source. The mobile units were HF Adcock systems.

By 1941 only a couple of illicit transmitters had been identified in the UK; these were German agents that had been "turned" and were transmitting under MI5 control. Many illicit transmissions had been logged emanating from German agents in occupied and neutral countries in Europe. The traffic became a valuable source of intelligence, so the control of RSS was subsequently passed to MI6 who were responsible for secret intelligence originating from outside the UK. The direction finding and interception operation increased in volume and importance until 1945.

The HF Adcock stations consisted of four 10 m vertical antennas surrounding a small wooden operators hut containing a receiver and a radio-goniometer which was adjusted to obtain the bearing. MF stations were also used which used four guyed 30 m lattice tower antennas. In 1941, RSS began experimenting with spaced loop direction finders, developed by the Marconi company and the UK National Physical Laboratories. These consisted of two parallel loops 1 to 2 m square on the ends of a rotatable 3 to 8 m beam. The angle of the beam was combined with results from a radiogoniometer to provide a bearing. The bearing obtained was considerably sharper than that obtained with the U Adcock system, but there were ambiguities which prevented the installation of 7 proposed S.L DF systems. The operator of an SL system was in a metal underground tank below the antennas. Seven underground tanks were installed, but only two SL systems were installed at Wymondham, Norfolk and Weaverthorp in Yorkshire. Problems were encountered resulting in the remaining five underground tanks being fitted with Adcock systems. The rotating SL antenna was turned by hand which meant successive measurements were a lot slower than turning the dial of a goniometer.

Another experimental spaced loop station was built near Aberdeen in 1942 for the Air Ministry with a semi-underground concrete bunker. This, too, was abandoned because of operating difficulties. By 1944, a mobile version of the spaced loop had been developed and was used by RSS in France following the D-Day invasion of Normandy.

The US military used a shore based version of the spaced loop DF in World War II called "DAB". The loops were placed at the ends of a beam, all of which was located inside a wooden hut with the electronics in a large cabinet with cathode-ray-tube display at the centre of the beam and everything being supported on a central axis. The beam was rotated manually by the operator.

The Royal Navy introduced a variation on the shore based HF DF stations in 1944 to track U-boats in the North Atlantic. They built groups of five DF stations, so that bearings from individual stations in the group could be combined and a mean taken. Four such groups were built in Britain at Ford End, Essex; Goonhavern, Cornwall; and Anstruther and Bowermadden in the Scottish Highlands. Groups were also built in Iceland, Nova Scotia, and Jamaica. The anticipated improvements were not realised but later statistical work improved the system and the Goonhavern and Ford End groups continued to be used during the Cold War. The Royal Navy also deployed direction finding equipment on ships tasked to anti-submarine warfare in order to try to locate German submarines, e.g. Captain class frigates were fitted with a medium frequency direction finding antenna (MF/DF) (the antenna was fitted in front of the bridge) and high frequency direction finding (HF/DF, "Huffduff") Type FH 4 antenna (the antenna was fitted on top of the mainmast).

A comprehensive reference on World War II wireless direction finding was written by Roland Keen, who was head of the engineering department of RSS at Hanslope Park. The DF systems mentioned here are described in detail in his 1947 book Wireless Direction Finding.

At the end of World War II a number of RSS DF stations continued to operate into the Cold War under the control of GCHQ the British SIGINT organisation.

Most direction finding effort within the UK now (2009) is directed towards locating unauthorised "pirate" FM broadcast radio transmissions. A network of remotely operated VHF direction finders are used mainly located around the major cities. The transmissions from mobile telephone handsets are also located by a form of direction finding using the comparative signal strength at the surrounding local "cell" receivers. This technique is often offered as evidence in UK criminal prosecutions and, almost certainly, for SIGINT purposes.

=== Emergency aid ===
Emergency position-indicating rescue beacons are widely deployed on civil aircraft and ships. Historically emergency location transmitters only sent a tone signal and relied on direction finding by search aircraft to locate the beacon. Modern emergency beacons transmit a unique identification signal that can include GPS location data that can aid in finding the exact location of the transmitter.

Avalanche transceivers operate on a standard 457 kHz, and are designed to help locate people and equipment buried by avalanches. Since the power of the beacon is so low the directionality of the radio signal is dominated by small scale field effects and can be quite complicated to locate.

=== Wildlife tracking ===
Location of radio-tagged animals by triangulation is a widely applied research technique for studying the movement of animals. The technique was first used in the early 1960s, when radio transmitters and batteries became small enough to attach to wildlife, and is now widely deployed for a variety of wildlife studies. Most tracking of wild animals that have been affixed with radio transmitter equipment is done by a field researcher using a handheld radio direction finding device. When the researcher wants to locate a particular animal, the location of the animal can be triangulated by determining the direction to the transmitter from several locations.

=== Reconnaissance ===
Phased arrays and other advanced antenna techniques are utilized to track launches of rocket systems and their resulting trajectories. These systems can be used for defensive purposes and also to gain intelligence on operation of missiles belonging to other nations. These same techniques are used for detection and tracking of conventional aircraft.

== Astronomy ==
Earth-based receivers can detect radio signals emanating from distant stars or regions of ionized gas. Receivers in radio telescopes can detect the general direction of such naturally occurring radio sources, sometimes correlating their location with objects visible with optical telescopes. Accurate measurement of the arrival time of radio impulses by two radio telescopes at different places on Earth, or the same telescope at different times in Earth's orbit around the Sun, may also allow estimation of the distance to a radio object.

=== Sport ===
Events hosted by groups and organizations that involve the use of radio direction finding skills to locate transmitters at unknown locations have been popular since the end of World War II. Many of these events were first promoted in order to practice the use of radio direction finding techniques for disaster response and civil defense purposes, or to practice locating the source of radio frequency interference. The most popular form of the sport, worldwide, is known as amateur radio direction finding (ARDF). Another form of the activity, known as "transmitter hunting", "mobile T-hunting" or "fox hunting" takes place in a larger geographic area, such as the metropolitan area of a large city, and most participants travel in motor vehicles while attempting to locate one or more radio transmitters with radio direction-finding techniques.

Selection of radio direction-finding stations
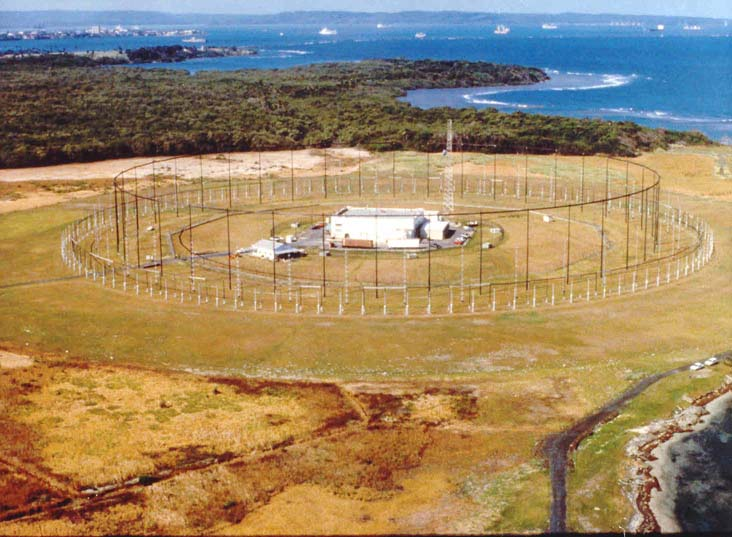
RDF antennas
(Galeta Island)

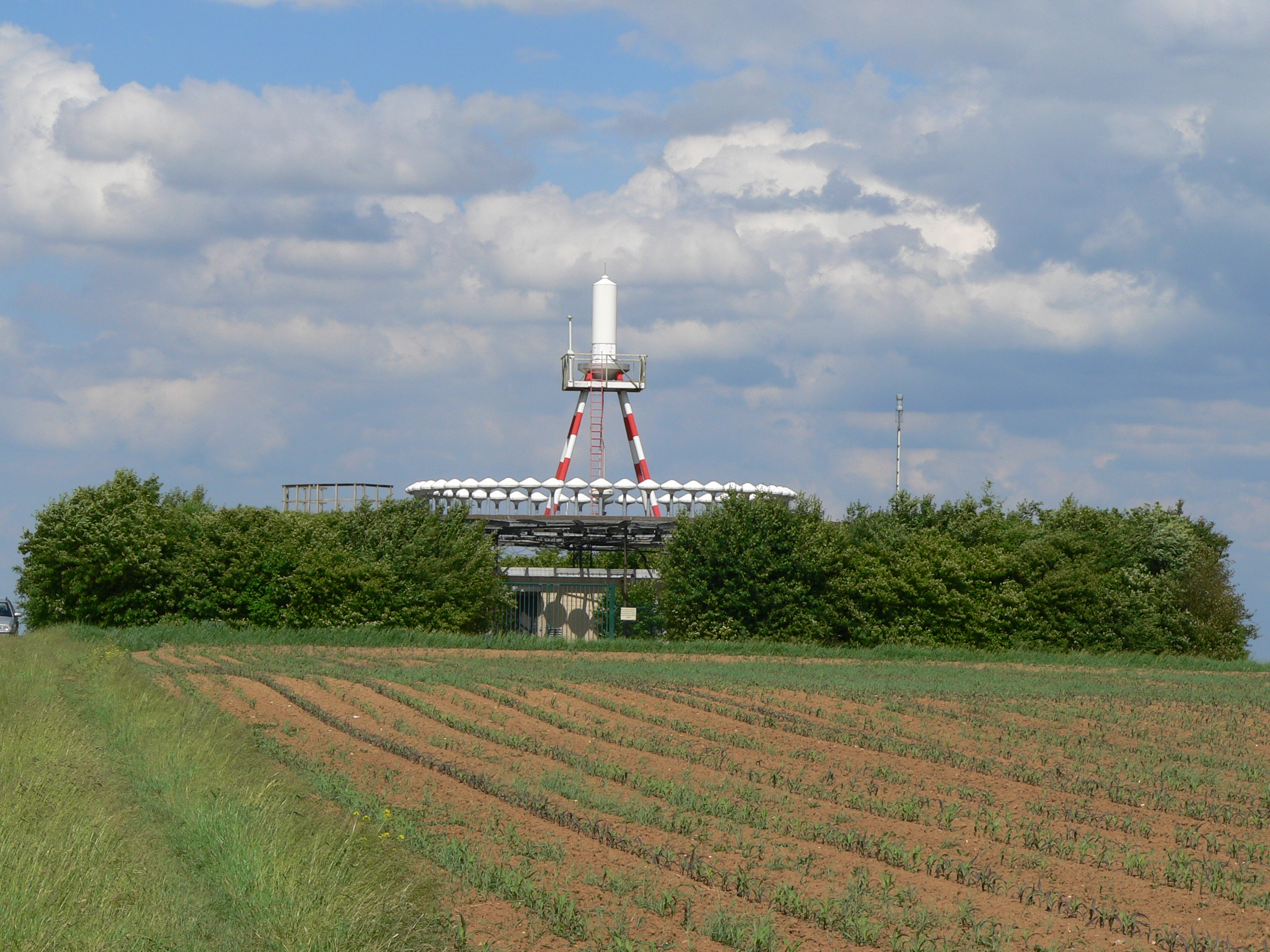
VORTAC
(providing azimuth guidance)

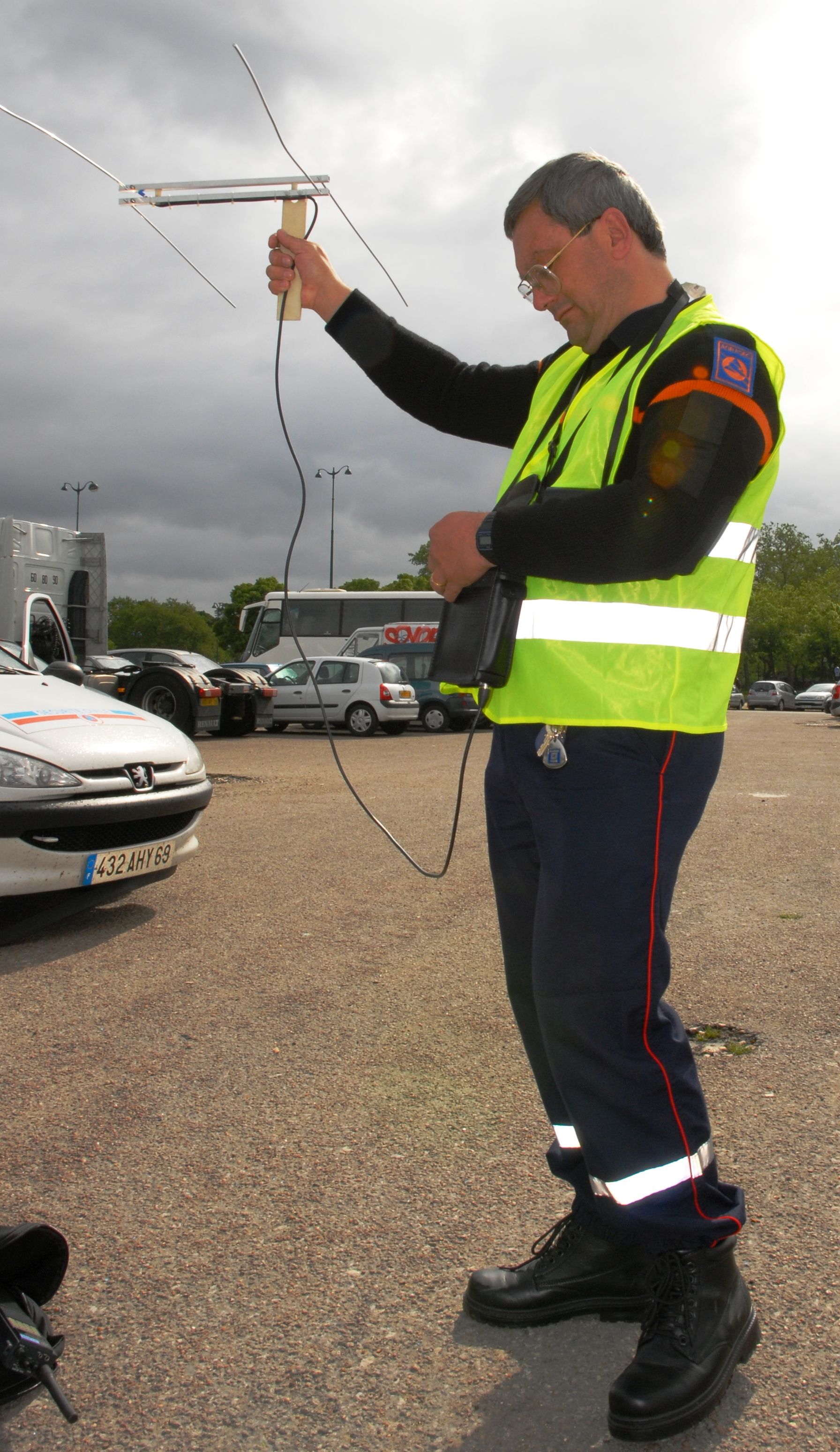
RDF on 121.5 MHz
(Aircraft emergency frequency)

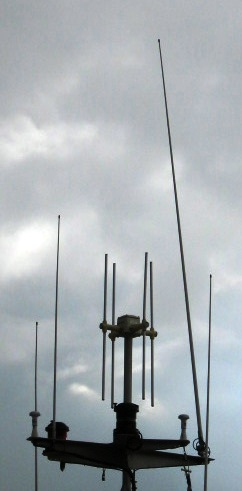
Aerial 121.5/156.8 MHz
(Emergency location beacon aircraft)

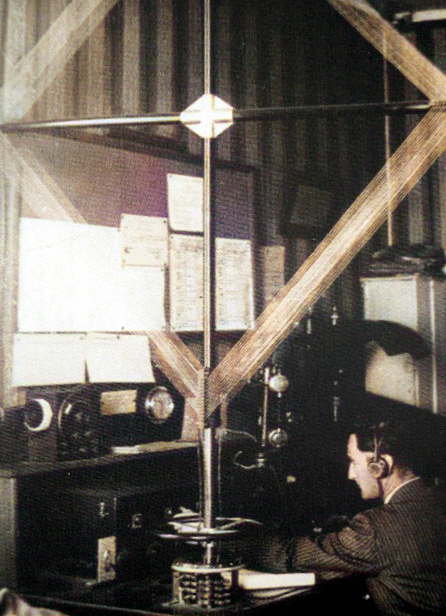
RDF station 410 kHz

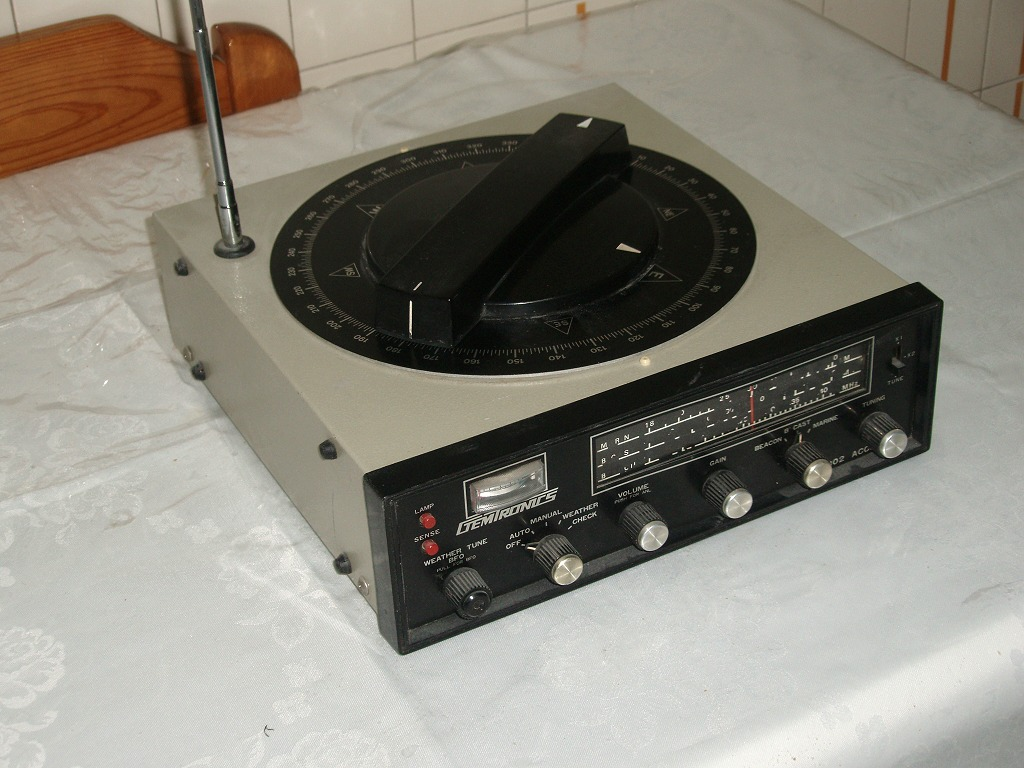
Maritime RDF station (GT-302)

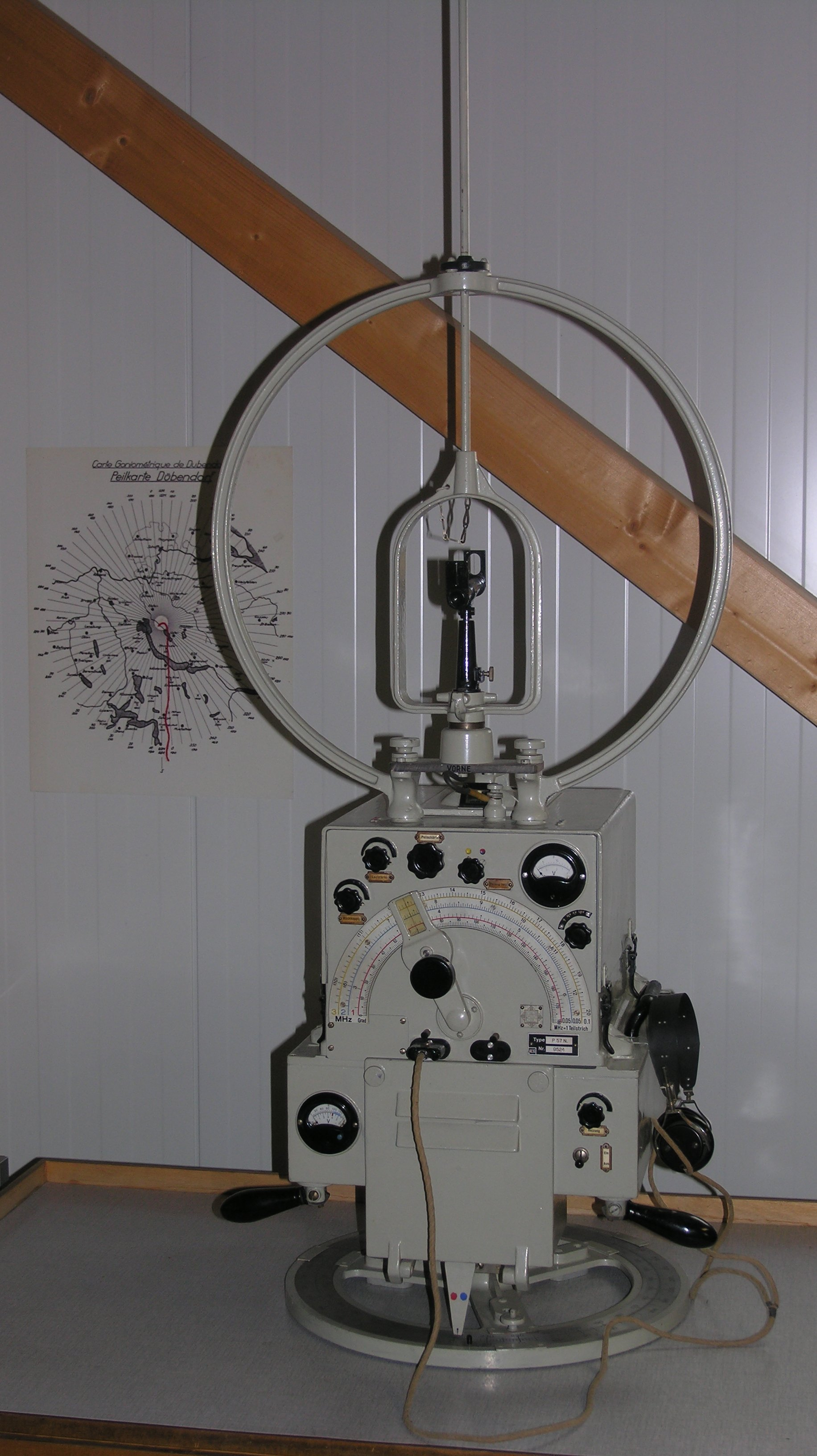
Maritime RDF station
(Pelengator)

== Direction finding at microwave frequencies ==
DF techniques for microwave frequencies were developed in the 1940s, in response to the growing numbers of transmitters operating at these higher frequencies. This required the design of new antennas and receivers for the DF systems.

In Naval systems, the DF capability became part of the Electronic Support Measures suite (ESM), where the directional information obtained augments other signal identification processes. In aircraft, a DF system provides additional information for the Radar Warning Receiver (RWR).

Over time, it became necessary to improve the performance of microwave DF systems in order to counter the evasive tactics being employed by some operators, such as low-probability-of-intercept radars and covert Data links.

=== Brief history of microwave development ===
Earlier in the century, vacuum tubes (thermionic valves) were used extensively in transmitters and receivers, but their high frequency performance was limited by transit time effects. Even with special processes to reduce lead lengths, such as frame grid construction, as used in the EF50, and planar construction, very few tubes could operate above UHF.

Intensive research work was carried out in the 1930s in order to develop transmitting tubes specifically for the microwave band which included, in particular, the klystron the cavity magnetron and the travelling wave tube (TWT). Following the successful development of these tubes, large scale production occurred in the following decade.

=== The advantages of microwave operation ===
Microwave signals have short wavelengths, which results in greatly improved target resolution when compared to RF systems. This permits better identification of multiple targets and, also, gives improved directional accuracy. Also, the antennas are small so they can be assembled into compact arrays and, in addition, they can achieve well defined beam patterns which can provide the narrow beams with high gain favoured by radars and Data links.

Other advantages of the newly available microwave band were the absence of fading (often a problem in the Shortwave radio (SW) band) and great increase in signal spectrum, compared to the congested RF bands already in use. In addition to being able to accommodate many more signals, the ability to use Spread spectrum and frequency hopping techniques now became possible.

Once microwave techniques had become established, there was rapid expansion into the band by both military and commercial users.

=== Antennas for DF ===
Antennas for DF have to meet different requirements from those for a radar or communication link, where an antenna with a narrow beam and high gain is usually an advantage. However, when carrying out direction finding, the bearing of the source may be unknown, so antennas with wide beamwidths are usually chosen, even though they have lower antenna boresight gain. In addition, the antennas are required to cover a wide band of frequencies.

The figure shows the normalized polar plot of a typical antenna gain characteristic, in the horizontal plane. The half-power beamwidth of the main beam is 2 × Ψ_{0}. Preferably, when using amplitude comparison methods for direction finding, the main lobe should approximate to a Gaussian characteristic. Although the figure also shows the presence of sidelobes, these are not a major concern when antennas are used in a DF array.

Typically, the boresight gain of an antenna is related to the beam width. For a rectangular horn,
$$\text{Gain} \approx \frac{30,\!000}{\mathrm{BW}_h \times \mathrm{BW}_v}$$
where BW_{h} and BW_{v} are the horizontal and vertical antenna beamwidths, respectively, in degrees. For a circular aperture, with beamwidth BW_{c}, it is
$$\text{Gain} \approx \frac{30,\!000}{ (\mathrm{BW}_c)^2}$$

Two antenna types, popular for DF, are cavity-backed spirals and horn antennas.

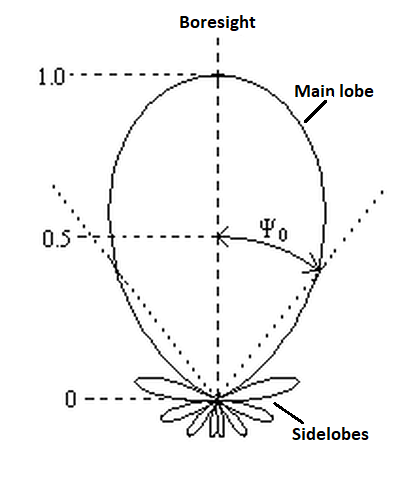
Antenna polar plot

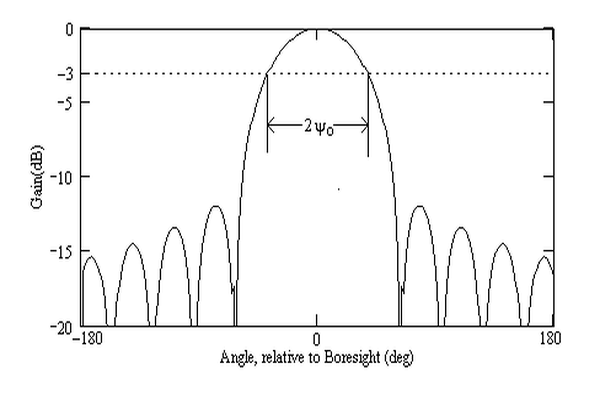
Antenna log plot

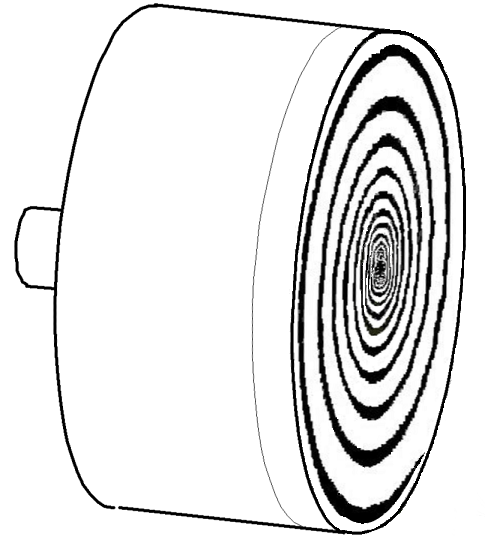
Cavity backed spiral

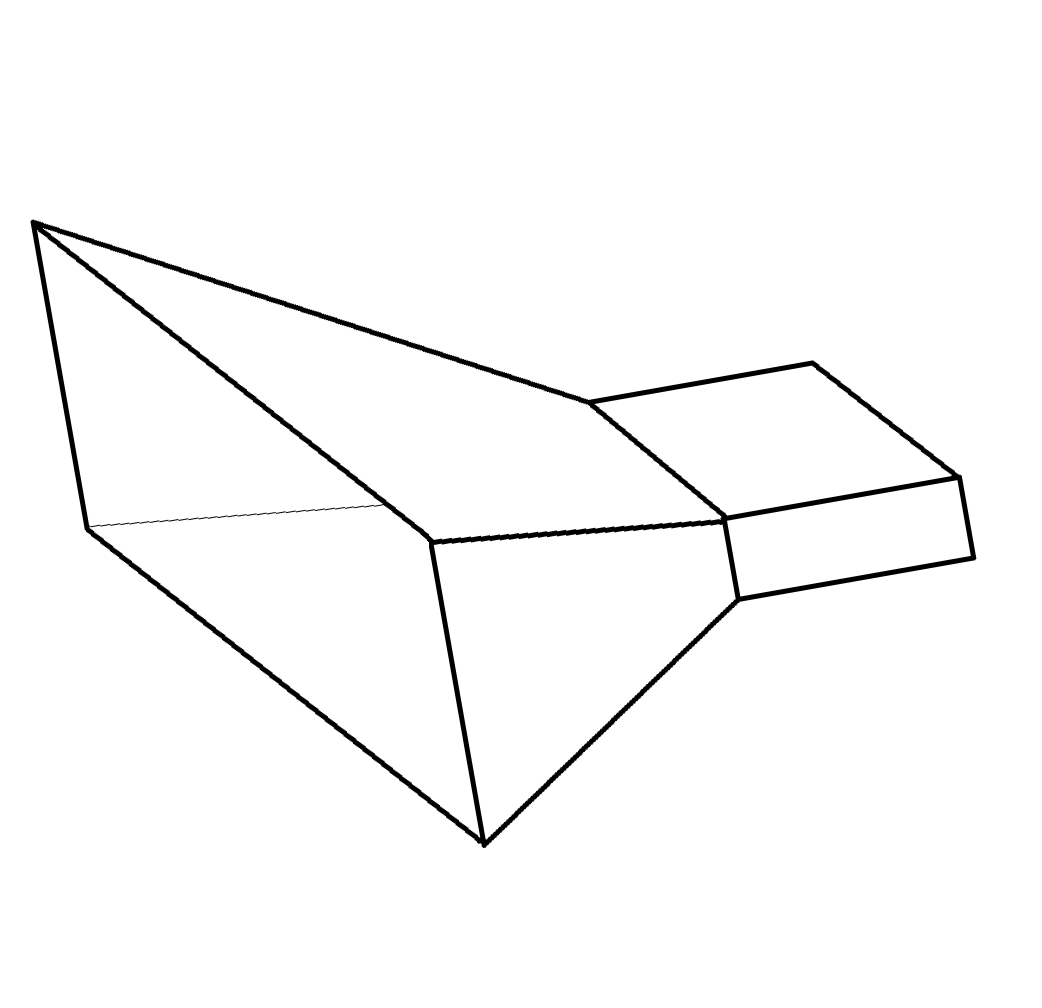
Pyramidal horn

Spiral antennas are capable of very wide bandwidths and have a nominal half-power beamwidth of about 70deg, making them very suitable for antenna arrays containing 4, 5 or 6 antennas.

For larger arrays, needing narrower beamwidths, horns may be used. The bandwidths of horn antennas may be increased by using double-ridged waveguide feeds and by using horns with internal ridges.

=== Microwave receivers ===
==== Early receivers ====
Early microwave receivers were usually simple "crystal-video" receivers, which use a crystal detector followed by a video amplifier with a compressive characteristic to extend the dynamic range. Such a receiver was wideband but not very sensitive. However, this lack of sensitivity could be tolerated because of the "range advantage" enjoyed by the DF receiver (see below).

==== Klystron and TWT preamplifiers ====
The klystron and TWT are linear devices and so, in principle, could be used as receiver preamplifiers. However, the klystron was quite unsuitable as it was a narrow-band device and extremely noisy and the TWT, although potentially more suitable, has poor matching characteristics and large bulk, which made it unsuitable for multi-channel systems using a preamplifier per antenna. However, a system has been demonstrated, in which a single TWT preamplifier selectively selects signals from an antenna array.

==== Transistor preamplifiers ====
Transistors suitable for microwave frequencies became available towards the end of the 1950s. The first of these was the metal oxide semiconductor field effect transistor (MOSFET). Others followed, for example, the metal-semiconductor field-effect transistor and the high electron mobility transistor (HEMT). Initially, discrete transistors were embedded in stripline or microstrip circuits, but microwave integrated circuits followed. With these new devices, low-noise receiver preamplifiers became possible, which greatly increased the sensitivity, and hence the detection range, of DF systems.

==== Range advantage ====
The DF receiver enjoys a detection range advantage over that of the radar receiver. This is because the signal strength at the DF receiver, due to a radar transmission, is proportional to 1/R^{2} whereas that at the radar receiver from the reflected return is proportional to σ/R^{4}, where R is the range and σ is the radar cross-section of the DF system. This results in the signal strength at the radar receiver being very much smaller than that at the DF receiver. Consequently, in spite of its poor sensitivity, a simple crystal-video DF receiver is, usually, able to detect the signal transmission from a radar at a greater range than that at which the Radar's own receiver is able to detect the presence of the DF system.

In practice, the advantage is reduced by the ratio of antenna gains (typically they are 36 dB and 10 dB for the Radar and ESM, respectively) and the use of Spread spectrum techniques, such as Chirp compression, by the Radar, to increase the processing gain of its receiver. On the other hand, the DF system can regain some advantage by using sensitive, low-noise, receivers and by using Stealth practices to reduce its radar cross-section, as with Stealth aircraft and Stealth ships.

=== The new demands on DF systems ===
The move to microwave frequencies meant a reappraisal of the requirements of a DF system. Now, the receiver could no longer rely on a continuous signal stream on which to carry out measurements. Radars with their narrow beams would only illuminate the antennas of the DF system infrequently. Furthermore, some radars wishing to avoid detection (those of smugglers, hostile ships and missiles) would radiate their signals infrequently and often at low power. Such a system is referred to as a low-probability-of-intercept radar. In other applications, such as microwave links, the transmitter's antenna may never point at the DF receiver at all, so reception is only possible by means of the signal leakage from antenna side lobes. In addition, covert Data links may only radiate a high data rate sequence very occasionally.

In general, in order to cater for modern circumstances, a broadband microwave DF system is required to have high sensitivity and have 360° coverage in order to have the ability to detect single pulses (often called amplitude monopulse) and achieve a high "Probability of Intercept" (PoI).

== DF by amplitude comparison ==
Amplitude comparison has been popular as a method for DF because systems are relatively simple to implement, have good sensitivity and, very importantly, a high probability of signal detection. Typically, an array of four, or more, squinted directional antennas is used to give 360 degree coverage. DF by phase comparison methods can give better bearing accuracy, but the processing is more complex. Systems using a single rotating dish antenna are more sensitive, small and relatively easy to implement, but have poor PoI.

Usually, the signal amplitudes in two adjacent channels of the array are compared, to obtain the bearing of an incoming wavefront but, sometimes, three adjacent channels are used to give improved accuracy. Although the gains of the antennas and their amplifying chains have to be closely matched, careful design and construction and effective calibration procedures can compensate for shortfalls in the hardware. Overall bearing accuracies of 2° to 10° (rms) have been reported using the method.

=== Two-channel DF ===
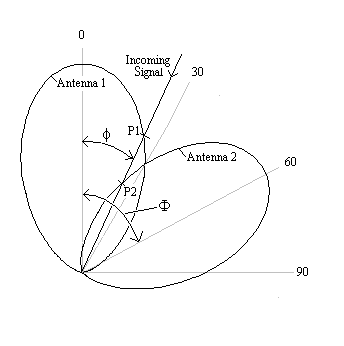
Two-port DF, polar plot (normalized)

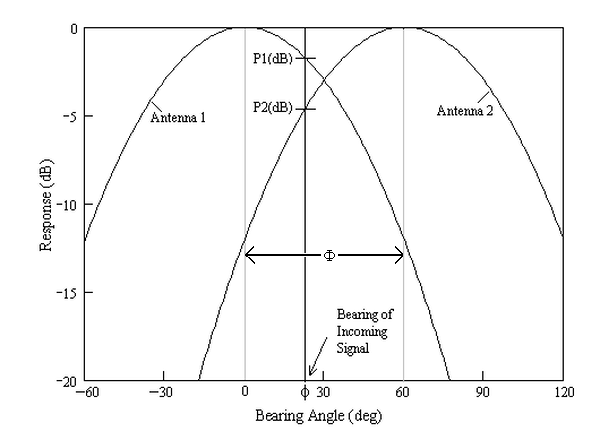
Two-port DF, log scale (normalized)

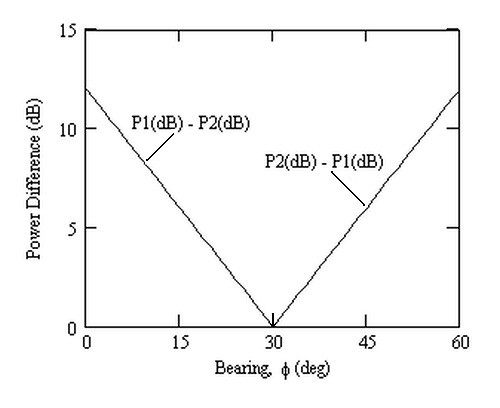
Power Diff. (dB) v. Bearing

Two-channel DF, using two adjacent antennas of a circular array, is achieved by comparing the signal power of the largest signal with that of the second largest signal. The direction of an incoming signal, within the arc described by two antennas with a squint angle of Φ, may be obtained by comparing the relative powers of the signals received. When the signal is on the boresight of one of the antennas, the signal at the other antenna will be about 12 dB lower. When the signal direction is halfway between the two antennas, signal levels will be equal and approximately 3 dB lower than the boresight value. At other bearing angles, φ, some intermediate ratio of the signal levels will give the direction.

If the antenna main lobe patterns have a Gaussian characteristic, and the signal powers are described in logarithmic terms (e.g. decibels (dB) relative to the boresight value), then there is a linear relationship between the bearing angle φ and the power level difference, i.e.:
$$\varphi \propto P_1(\text{dB}) - P_2(\text{dB}),$$
where P_{1}(dB) and P_{2}(dB) are the outputs of two adjacent channels. The thumbnail shows a typical plot.

To give 360° coverage, antennas of a circular array are chosen, in pairs, according to the signal levels received at each antenna. If there are N antennas in the array, at angular spacing (squint angle) Φ, then Φ = 2π/N radians (= 360/N degrees).

==== Basic equations for two-port DF ====
If the main lobes of the antennas have a Gaussian characteristic, then the output P_{1}(φ), as a function of bearing angle φ, is given by

$$P_1(\varphi)= G_0 \exp \left[ -A \left( \frac{\varphi}{\Psi_0} \right)^2 \right]$$

where

G_{0} is the antenna boresight gain (i.e. when φ = 0),
Ψ_{0} is one half the half-power beamwidth
A = –ln(0.5), so that P_{1}(φ)/G_{0} = 0.5 when φ = Ψ_{0}
and angles are in radians.

The second antenna, squinted at Φ and with the same boresight gain G_{0} gives an output

$$P_2 = G_0 \exp \left[ -A \left( \frac{\Phi - \varphi}{\Psi_0} \right)^2 \right]$$

Comparing signal levels,

$$\frac{P_1}{P_2}
= \frac{ G_0 \exp \left[ -A \left( \frac{\varphi}{\Psi_0} \right)^2 \right] }{ G_0 \exp \left[ -A \left( \frac{\Phi - \varphi}{\Psi_0} \right)^2 \right] }
=  \exp \left[ \frac{A}{\Psi_0^2} \left( \Phi^2 - 2\Phi\varphi \right) \right]$$

The natural logarithm of the ratio is

$$\ln \left( \frac{P_1}{P_2} \right) = \ln P_1 - \ln P_2 = \frac{A}{\Psi_0^2} \left( \Phi^2 - 2\Phi\varphi \right)$$

Rearranging:
$$\varphi = \frac{\Psi_0^2}{2A\Phi} \left( \ln P_2 -\ln P_1 \right) + \frac{\Phi}{2}$$

This shows the linear relationship between the output level difference, expressed logarithmically, and the bearing angle φ.

Natural logarithms can be converted to decibels (dBs) (where dBs are referred to boresight gain) by using $\ln(X) = \tfrac{X(\text{dB})}{10\log_{10}(e)},$ so the equation can be written

$$\varphi = \frac{\Psi_0^2}{6.0202 \, \Phi} \bigl( P_2(\text{dB}) - P_1(\text{dB}) \bigr) + \frac{\Phi}{2}$$

=== Three-channel DF ===
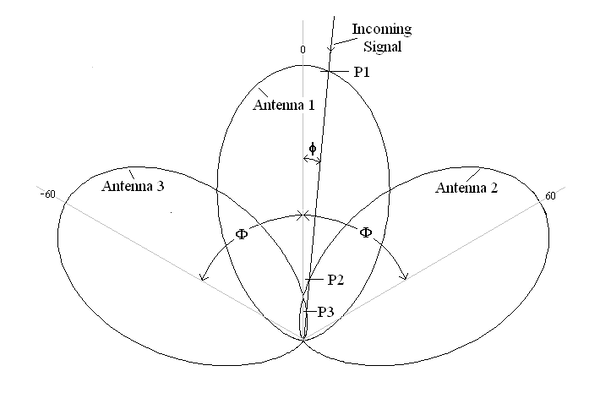
Three-port DF, polar plot (normalized)

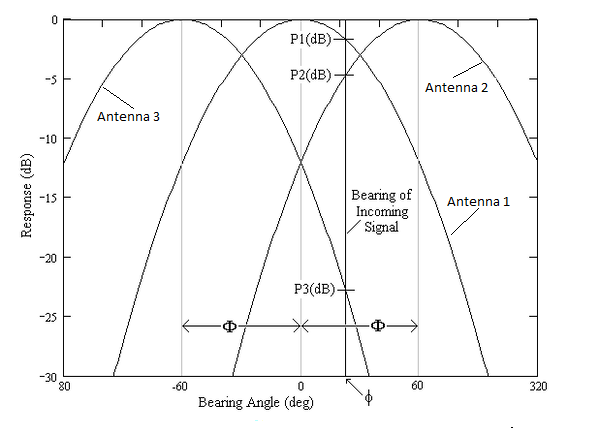
Three-port DF, log scale (normalized)

Improvements in bearing accuracy may be achieved if amplitude data from a third antenna are included in the bearing processing.

For three-channel DF, with three antennas squinted at angles Φ, the direction of the incoming signal is obtained by comparing the signal power of the channel containing the largest signal with the signal powers of the two adjacent channels, situated at each side of it.

For the antennas in a circular array, three antennas are selected according to the signal levels received, with the largest signal present at the central channel.

When the signal is on the boresight of Antenna 1 (φ = 0), the signal from the other two antennas will equal and about 12 dB lower. When the signal direction is halfway between two antennas (φ = 30°), their signal levels will be equal and approximately 3 dB lower than the boresight value, with the third signal now about 24 dB lower. At other bearing angles, φ, some intermediate ratios of the signal levels will give the direction.

==== Basic equations for three-port DF ====
For a signal incoming at a bearing φ, taken here to be to the right of boresight of Antenna 1, the three channel outputs are the following:

$$\begin{align}
P_1 &= G_T \exp \left[ -A \left( \frac{\varphi}{\Psi_0} \right)^2 \right] \\[4pt]
P_2 &= G_T \exp \left[ -A \left( \frac{\Phi - \varphi}{\Psi_0} \right)^2 \right] \\[4pt]
P_3 &= G_T \exp \left[ -A \left( \frac{\Phi + \varphi}{\Psi_0} \right)^2 \right]
\end{align}$$

where G_{T} is the overall gain of each channel, including antenna boresight gain, and is assumed to be the same in all three channels. As before, in these equations, angles are in radians, Φ = 360/N degrees = 2π/N radians and A = –ln(0.5).

As earlier, these can be expanded and combined to give:

$$\begin{align}
\ln P_1 - \ln P_2 &= \frac{A}{\Psi_0^2} (\Phi^2 - 2\Phi\varphi) \\[4pt]
\ln P_1 - \ln P_3 &= \frac{A}{\Psi_0^2} (\Phi^2 + 2\Phi\varphi)
\end{align}$$

Eliminating $\tfrac{A}{\Psi_0^2}$ and rearranging:

$$\varphi = \frac{\Delta_{1,2} - \Delta_{1,3}}{\Delta_{1,2} + \Delta_{1,3}} \frac{\Phi}{2}
= \frac{\Delta_{2,3}}{\Delta_{1,2} + \Delta_{1,3}} \frac{\Phi}{2}$$

where:

$$\begin{align}
\Delta_{1,3} &= \ln P_1 - \ln P_3 \\[2pt]
\Delta_{1,2} &= \ln P_1 - \ln P_2 \\[2pt]
\Delta_{2,3} &= \ln P_2 - \ln P_3
\end{align}$$

The difference values here are in nepers but could be in decibels.

The bearing value, obtained using this equation, is independent of the antenna beamwidth (= 2Ψ_{0}), so this value does not have to be known for accurate bearing results to be obtained. Also, there is a smoothing affect, for bearing values near to the boresight of the middle antenna, so there is no discontinuity in bearing values there, as an incoming signals moves from left to right (or vice versa) through boresight, as can occur with 2-channel processing.

=== Bearing uncertainty due to noise ===
Many of the causes of bearing error, such as mechanical imperfections in the antenna structure, poor gain matching of receiver gains, or non-ideal antenna gain patterns may be compensated by calibration procedures and corrective look-up tables, but thermal noise will always be a degrading factor. As all systems generate thermal noise then, when the level of the incoming signal is low, the signal-to-noise ratios in the receiver channels will be poor, and the accuracy of the bearing prediction will suffer.

In general, a guide to bearing uncertainty is given by

$$\Delta \varphi_\text{RMS} =
0.724 \frac{ 2\Psi_0 }{ \sqrt{\text{SNR}_0} }
\quad \text{[degrees]}$$

for a signal at crossover, but where SNR_{0} is the signal-to-noise ratio that would apply at boresight.

To obtain more precise predictions at a given bearing, the actual S:N ratios of the signals of interest are used. (The results may be derived assuming that noise induced errors are approximated by relating differentials to uncorrelated noise).

For adjacent processing using, say, Channel 1 and Channel 2, the bearing uncertainty (angle noise), Δφ (rms), is given below. In these results, square-law detection is assumed and the SNR figures are for signals at video (baseband), for the bearing angle φ.

$$\Delta \varphi_\text{RMS} =
\frac{\Phi}{2}
\frac{\Psi_0^2}{-\ln(0.5)\Phi}
\sqrt{\frac{1}{\text{SNR}_1} + \frac{1}{\text{SNR}_2}}
\quad \text{[rads]}$$

where SNR_{1} and SNR_{2} are the video (base-band) signal-to-noise values for the channels for Antenna 1 and Antenna 2, when square-law detection is used.

In the case of 3-channel processing, an expression which is applicable when the S:N ratios in all three channels exceeds unity (when ln(1 + 1/SNR) ≈ 1/SNR is true in all three channels), is

$$\Delta \varphi_\text{RMS} =
\frac{1}{-2\ln(0.5)}
\frac{\Psi_0^2}{\Phi^2}
\sqrt{
\left( \varphi + \frac{\Phi}{2} \right)^2 \frac{1}{\text{SNR}_2}
+ \frac{4\varphi^2}{\text{SNR}_1}
+ \left( \varphi - \frac{\Phi}{2} \right)^2 \frac{1}{\text{SNR}_3}
}$$

where SNR_{1}, SNR_{2} and SNR_{3} are the video signal-to-noise values for Channel 1, Channel 2, and Channel 3 respectively, for the bearing angle φ.

=== A typical DF system with six antennas ===
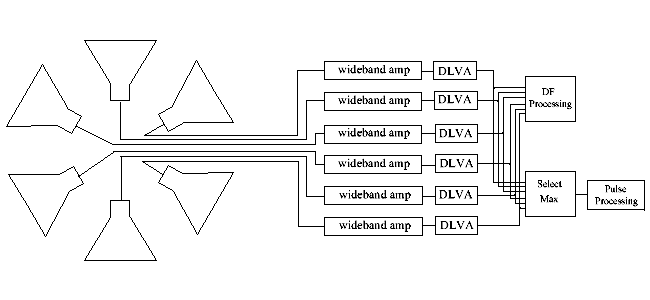
Six-port DF system

A schematic of a possible DF system, employing six antennas, is shown in the figure.

The signals received by the antennas are first amplified by a low-noise preamplifier before detection by detector-log-video-amplifiers (DLVAs). The signal levels from the DLVAs are compared to determine the angle of arrival. By considering the signal levels on a logarithmic scale, as provided by the DLVAs, a large dynamic range is achieved and, in addition, the direction finding calculations are simplified when the main lobes of antenna patterns have a Gaussian characteristic, as shown earlier.

A necessary part of the DF analysis is to identify the channel which contains the largest signal and this is achieved by means of a fast comparator circuit. In addition to the DF process, other properties of the signal may be investigated, such as pulse duration, frequency, pulse repetition frequency (PRF) and modulation characteristics. The comparator operation usually includes hysteresis, to avoid jitter in the selection process when the bearing of the incoming signal is such that two adjacent channels contain signals of similar amplitude.

Often, the wideband amplifiers are protected from local high power sources (as on a ship) by input limiters and/or filters. Similarly the amplifiers might contain notch filters to remove known, but unwanted, signals which could impairs the system's ability to process weaker signals. Some of these issues are covered in RF chain.

== See also ==
- Amplitude monopulse
- AN/FLR-9, a cold war US Air Force HF direction finding system.
- AN/FRD-10, a cold war US Navy HF direction finding system.
- Battle of the Beams
- Electric beacon
- Geolocation
- Indoor positioning system
- Listening station
- MUSIC (algorithm)
- Phase interferometry
- Position fixing
- Radio determination
- Radio fix
- Radio location
- Real-time locating system
- Signals intelligence
- TDOA
- VOR/DME
- Wullenweber

== Bibliography ==
- Baker, W. J. (2013). A History of the Marconi Company 1874-1965. Routledge. ISBN 9781134526079.
- Elliott, Peter (1972). "The Lend-Lease Captains". Warship International (3). International Naval Research Organization: 255.
- Appleyard, S.F.; Linford, R.S.; Yarwood, P.J. (1988). Marine Electronic Navigation (2nd ed.). Routledge & Kegan Paul. pp. 68–69. ISBN 0-7102-1271-2.
- M. Bondarenko and V.I. Slyusar. (August 2011). "Influence of jitter in ADC on precision of direction-finding by digital antenna arrays" (PDF). Radioelectronics and Communications Systems. 54 (8): 436–445. Bibcode:2011RCSys..54..436B. doi:10.3103/S0735272711080061. S2CID 110506568.
- Howeth, Linwood (1963). History of Communications-Electronics in the United States Navy. US Navy. pp. 261–265.
- Yeang, Chen-Pang (2013). Probing the Sky with Radio Waves. University of Chicago Press. ISBN 9780226015194.
- Radio Direction Finding Applications Literature (RDF Products)
- Doppler Systems Application Notes (Doppler Systems)
