= Aitchison =

- Pronunciation: /ˈeɪtʃɪsən/ AY-chiss-ən

Origin
- Language: Scots
- Meaning: Adam ("red earth")
- Region of origin: Scotland

Other names
- Variant forms: Acheson, Atkinson, Aicheson, and Aitcheson, Adcock, Atcock

Aitchison is a Scottish surname of Scots origin. It derives from the pet name Atkin, which is a diminutive of Adam.

Another variant of the name is Acheson. It corresponds to the English name Atkinson, which is particularly common in Northern England. At the time of the British Census of 1881, the relative frequency of the name Aitcheson was highest in Berwickshire (174.6 times the British average), followed by Haddingtonshire, Roxburghshire, Selkirkshire, Peeblesshire, Dumfriesshire, Edinburghshire, Linlithgowshire, Northumberland and Lanarkshire. The Aitchisons are traditionally a mainly Borders and Lowlands family. They are considered to be a sept of Clan Gordon.

In Ireland, the name is common only in Ulster and particularly in counties Antrim and Down. Some Aitchisons are descended from Planters, although the name was recorded in Ireland before that period.

Acheson is a variation of the name in Scotland and the Border region, having been originally spelled Atzinson (with the 'z' being pronounced as 'y', as in yet).

== People ==
- Alexander Aitchison (1850–1905), Canadian fire chief
- Barrie Aitchison (1937–2021), English footballer
- Beatrice Aitchison (1908–1997), American mathematician, statistician, and transportation economist
- Ben Aitchison (born 1999), English cricketer
- Cara Aitchison (born 1965), British human geographer and academic
- Charles Umpherston Aitchison (1832–1896), Scottish politician
- Charlotte Aitchison also known as Charli xcx (born 1992), Singer-songwriter
- Craigie Mason Aitchison, Lord Aitchison (1882–1941), Scottish politician and judge
  - His son Craigie Aitchison (painter) (1926–2009), Scottish painter
- D. Craig Aitchison (born 1968), Canadian army officer
- Danielle Aitchison (born 2001), New Zealand para-athlete
- Dominic Aitchison (born 1976), Scottish bassist and songwriter
- Ern Aitchison (1905–1991), Australian rugby player
- George Aitchison (1825–1910), British architect
- George Aitchison (1864–1895), Scottish rugby player
- Gordon Aitchison (1909–1990), Canadian basketball player
- Guy Aitchison (born 1968), American tattoo artist and painter
- Hannah Aitchison (born 1966), American tattoo artist
- Helen Aitchison (1881–1947), English tennis player
- Holly Aitchison (born 1997), English rugby player
- Ian Aitchison (born 1936), English physicist
- Jack Aitchison (1911–1976), Australian rugby player
- Jack Aitchison (born 2000), Scottish footballer
- James Aitchison (cricketer) (1920–1994), Scottish first class cricketer
- James Edward Tierney Aitchison (1836–1898), Scottish surgeon and botanist
- James H. Aitchison (1908–1994), Canadian academic and politician
- Jean Aitchison (born 1938), British linguist
- Jenny Aitchison, Australian politician
- John Aitchison (1779–1875), British Army officer
- John Aitchison (1926–2016), Scottish statistician
- John Aitchison (1928–2009), English cricketer
- Martin Aitchison (1919–2016), British illustrator for Eagle comic and Ladybird books
- Peter Aitchison (footballer) (1931–2022), English footballer
- Peter Aitchison, New Zealand rower
- Raleigh Aitchison (1887–1958), American baseball player
- Ronald Ernest Aitchison (1921–1996), Australian physicist
- Scott Aitchison (born 1973), Canadian politician
- Suzy Aitchison, English actress
- Tom Aitchison (1907–1977), Scotland rugby player
- W. J. Aitchison (born 1941), Canadian army officer
- Charli XCX, real name Charlotte Aitchison (born 1992), British singer-songwriter

== Other uses ==
- Aitchison College, Pakistan
- Dollond & Aitchison, a British chain of opticians

== See also ==
- Acheson (surname)
- Atchison (disambiguation)
- Atkinson (surname)
