= Arthur Acheson =

Arthur Acheson may refer to:

- Sir Arthur Acheson, 5th Baronet (1688–1748), the son of Nicholas Acheson, 4th Baronet
- Arthur Acheson, 1st Earl of Gosford (1744/45–1807) the grandson of above; the title Earl of Gosford was created for him

== See also ==
- Acheson (surname)
