= Atcheson =

Atcheson is a surname of Anglo-Scottish origin. Notable people with this surname:

- G. Gordon Atcheson (born 1954), American judge
- George Atcheson Jr. (1896–1947), American diplomat to Japan after World War II, Chairman of the Allied Council for Japan
- Nathaniel Atcheson (1772–1825), English ship-owner
- Paul Atcheson (born 1973), English rugby league footballer
- Randall Atcheson (born 1951), American concert pianist
- Sheree Atcheson (born 1991), Sri Lankan-Irish computer scientist
- Tom Atcheson (born 2006), Northern Irish footballer
- William Atcheson Stewart (1915–1990), Canadian politician
- William Atcheson Traill (1844–1933), Irish engineer

== See also ==
- Atchison (disambiguation)
- Acheson (disambiguation)
