= Cone of Silence =

Cone of silence may refer to:

== Fictional devices ==
- Cone of silence (Dune), a fictional device used for privacy in the 1965 novel Dune
- Cone of Silence (Get Smart), a fictional device from the 1960s American television comedy series Get Smart
- Cone of silence, a tool of telepathic isolation created by the Central Computer in Arthur C. Clarke's 1956 novel The City and the Stars

== Literature and film ==
- Cone of Silence, 1959 novel by Arthur David Beaty
  - Cone of Silence (film), a 1960 British aviation drama based on the novel
- The Cone of Silence, a booklet of poetry written by British-Canadian poet Todd Swift (born 1966)

== Science ==
- Cone of silence (navigation), an element of aircraft navigation in the 1930s and 1940s
- Cone of silence (radar), the area unable to be "seen" by a radar antenna

== Other ==
- "The Cone of Silence", a song on the 1986 Yo La Tengo album Ride the Tiger
