= John Aitchison (disambiguation) =

John Aitchison (1926–2016) was a Scottish statistician.

John or Jack Aitchison may also refer to:

- John Aitchison (cricketer) (1928–2009), English cricketer
- John Aitchison (British Army officer) (1779–1875)
- John D. Aitchison, Canadian American molecular cell biologist
- Jack Aitchison (born 2000), Scottish footballer
- Jack Aitchison (Australian footballer) (1911–1976), Australian rules footballer
- Jack Aitchison, candidate in Midlothian Council election, 2007 and 2012

== See also ==
- Craigie Aitchison (painter) (John Ronald Craigie Aitchison, 1926–2009), Scottish painter
