= Acheson (surname) =

- Pronunciation: /ˈætʃɪsən/ ATCH-iss-ən

Origin
- Languages: Anglo-Scottish, Norman
- Meaning: Adam ("red earth")
- Region of origin: England, Scotland, Ulster

Other names
- Variant forms: Atkinson, Aitchison, Aicheson, and Aitcheson, Adcock, Atcock

Acheson is a surname of Anglo-Scots origin with Norman antecedents. It derives from the pet name Atkin, which is a diminutive of Adam.

In Scotland the name is more usually rendered as Acheson, while it is more usually found rendered as Atkinson in England, where it is particularly common in the north. In Ireland the name is common only in Ulster and particularly in counties Antrim and Down. A different spelling emerged in Canada, as Atcheson. Some Atkinsons are descended from Planters, although the name was recorded in Ireland before that period.

Acheson is a variation of the name in Scotland and the Border region, having been originally spelled Atzinson (with the 'z' being pronounced as 'y', as in yet).

== People ==
- Archibald Acheson, 1st Viscount Gosford (1718–1790), Irish peer and politician
- Archibald Acheson, 2nd Earl of Gosford (1776–1849), British politician
- Sir Arthur Acheson, 5th Baronet (1688–1748), Irish politician and baronet
- Carrie Acheson (1934–2023), Irish politician
- David John Acheson (born 1946), British applied mathematician
- Dean Acheson (1893–1971), American statesman and lawyer
- Sir Donald Acheson (1926–2010), British physician
- Edward Goodrich Acheson (1856–1931), American chemist and inventor
- Ernest F. Acheson (1855–1917), American politician and newspaper editor
- Frank Oswald Victor Acheson (1887–1948), New Zealand judge
- James Acheson (born 1946), British costume designer
- John Acheson (goldsmith) (fl. 1560–1581), Scottish goldsmith and mint official
- John Acheson (actor) (died 1998), British actor
- Kenny Acheson (born 1957), British Formula One driver
- Marcus W. Acheson (1828–1906), American judge
- Sir Nicholas Acheson, 4th Baronet (c. 1655–1701), Irish baronet and politician
- Peter Acheson (born 1990), Irish Gaelic football player
- Earl of Gosford, a title held by the Acheson family
