= Adcock =

Origin
- Region of origin: England

Other names
- Variant forms: Atcock, Hadcock: meaning: "Adam's son" or "offspring of Adam"

Adcock is an English surname. Notable people with the surname include:

- Alfred Adcock (1916–2005), English cricketer
- Arthur St. John Adcock (1864–1930), English novelist, journalist and poet
- Betty Adcock, American poet
- Brett Adcock (born 1986), American tech entrepreneur
- C. C. Adcock (born 1971), American musician
- Chris Adcock, English badminton player
- Clarence Lionel Adcock (1895–1967), American Army Officer
- Eddie Adcock, American bluegrass musician
- Fleur Adcock (1934–2024), New Zealand poet
- Frank Adcock, British engineer, inventor of the Adcock antenna
- Gabby Adcock, English badminton player
- Gavin Adcock, American country music singer
- Sir Frank Adcock (1886–1968), English classical historian
- Hugh Adcock (1903–1975), English footballer
- Jamar Adcock (1917–1999), American politician and banker
- Jed Adcock (born 1985), Australian rules footballer
- Joe Adcock (1927–1999), Major League Baseball player
- Joseph Adcock (1864–1914), English cricketer and clergyman
- Levy Adcock, American football player
- Nathan Adcock (baseball), Major League Baseball player
- Neil Adcock (1931–2013), South African cricketer
- Sally Adcock, English actress, known for Tom Grattan's War
- Ty Adcock (born 1997), Major League Baseball player
- William Adcock (businessman) (1846–1931), Australian journalist
- William Adcock (politician) (1850–1926), American politician and farmer
- Willis Adcock (1922–2003), American chemist and electrical engineer

Other topics referred to by the term Adcock include:

- Adcock antenna, antenna arrangement used for direction finding
- An elementary school in the Clark County School District
- Adcock River, river in Western Australia
