= Hadcock =

Hadcock is an English surname, a variant of Adcock. Notable people with this surname include:

- Charles Hadcock (b. 1965), English sculptor
- Richard Neville Hadcock (1895–1980), English historian
- Tim Hadcock-Mackay (1963–2006), English hotelier
