= William Adcock =

William Adcock may refer to:

- William Adcock (businessman)
- William Adcock (politician)
