= Craigie Aitchison =

Craigie Aitchison may refer to:

- Craigie Aitchison, Lord Aitchison (1882–1941), Scottish politician and judge
- Craigie Aitchison (painter) (1926–2009), his son, Scottish painter
- D. Craig Aitchison (born 1968), Canadian Forces officer
