= Edward Leslie =

Edward Leslie may refer to:

- Sir Edward Leslie, 1st Baronet (1744–1818), Anglo-Irish politician
- Brutus Beefcake (Edward Harrison Leslie, born 1957), American professional wrestler

== See also ==
- Eddie Leslie, British actor
