= Earl of Gosford =

Title in the peerage of Ireland

- Arms of Acheson, Earl of Gosford: Argent, a Double-Headed Eagle displayed Sable, beaked and membered Or, on a Chief Vert, two Mullets Or. Crest: A Cock Gules, standing upon a Trumpet Or. Supporters: Dexter: A Leopard proper, collared and chained Or; Sinister: A Leopard reguardant proper, collared and chained Or.
- Creation date: 1 February 1806
- Created by: George III
- Peerage: Peerage of Ireland
- First holder: Arthur Acheson, 2nd Viscount Gosford
- Present holder: Charles Acheson, 7th Earl of Gosford
- Heir presumptive: Nicholas Acheson
- Subsidiary titles: Viscount Gosford; Baron Gosford; Baron Worlingham (United Kingdom); Baron Acheson (United Kingdom); Baronet ‘of Market Hill’ (Nova Scotia)
- Status: Extant
- Former seat: Gosford Castle
- Motto: VIGILANTIBUS (To be watchful)

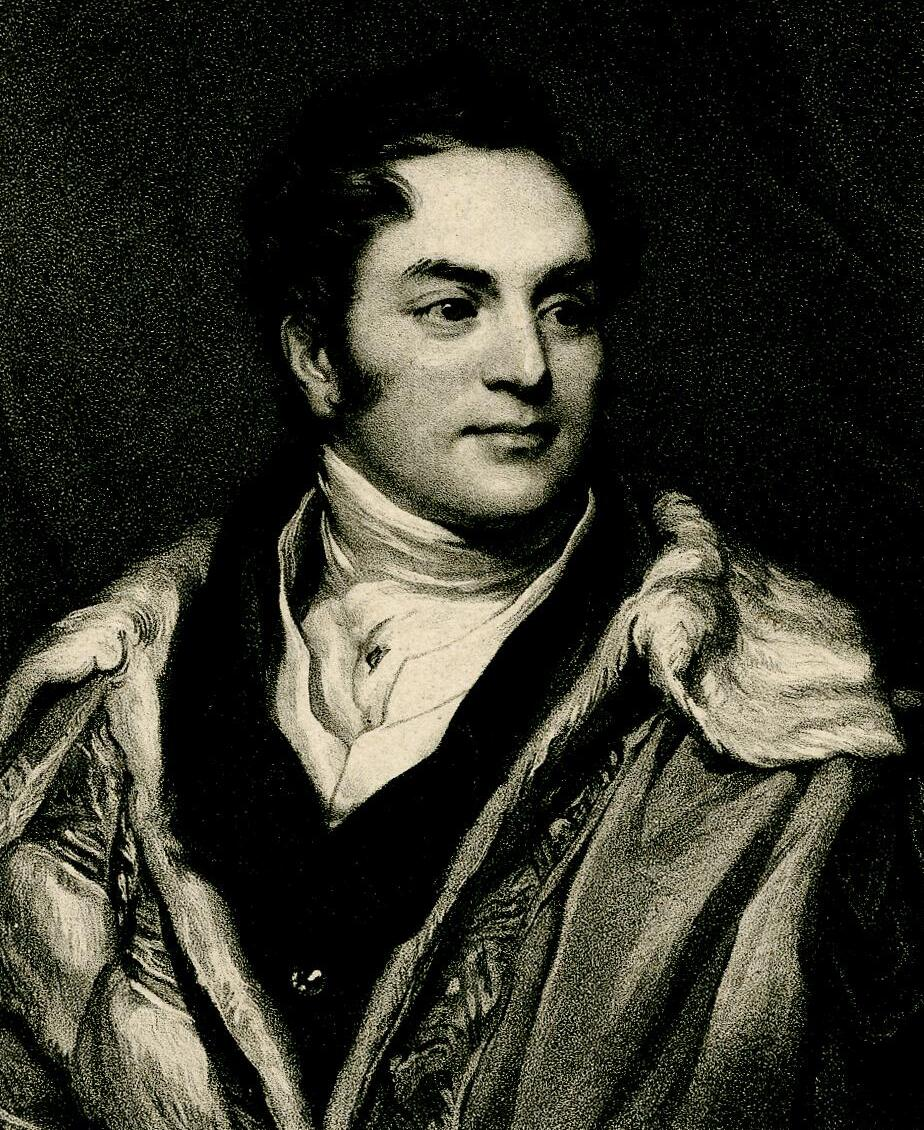
Archibald Acheson, 2nd Earl of Gosford

Earl of Gosford is a title in the Peerage of Ireland. It was created in 1806 for Arthur Acheson, 2nd Viscount Gosford.

The Acheson family descends from the Scottish statesman Sir Archibald Acheson, 1st Baronet of Edinburgh, who later settled in Markethill, County Armagh. He served as Solicitor General for Scotland, as a Senator of Justice (with the title Lord Glencairn), as an Extraordinary Lord of Session as 'Lord Glencairn', and as Secretary of State for Scotland. In 1628 he was created a baronet in the Baronetage of Nova Scotia, with remainder to his heirs male whatsoever. He was succeeded by his son from his first marriage, the 2nd Baronet. He married but died without male issue at a relatively early age and was succeeded by his half-brother, George, the 3rd Baronet, who settled in Ireland and was High Sheriff for Co. Armagh and Tyrone.

His son, the 4th Baronet, represented County Armagh in the Irish House of Commons. On his death the title passed to his son, the fifth Baronet. He sat as Member of the Irish Parliament for Mullingar. His son, the sixth Baronet, represented Dublin University and Enniskillen in the Irish House of Commons. In 1776 he was raised to the Peerage of Ireland as Baron Gosford, of Market Hill in the County of Armagh, and in 1785 he was further honoured when he was made Viscount Gosford, of Market Hill in the County of Armagh, also in the Peerage of Ireland.

He was succeeded by his son, the second Viscount. He sat in the Irish Parliament as the representative for Old Leighlin from 1783 to 1790. In 1806 he was created Earl of Gosford in the Peerage of Ireland. Since then, heirs apparent to the earldom have traditionally used the invented courtesy title of Viscount Acheson. His son, the second Earl, sat on the Whig benches in the House of Lords as an Irish representative peer from 1811 to 1849 and served under Lord Melbourne as Captain of the Yeomen of the Guard in 1834 and 1835. Between 1835 and 1838 he was Governor General of British North America. Lord Gosford married Mary, daughter of Robert Sparrow of Worlingham Hall in Suffolk. In 1835 he was created Baron Worlingham, of Beccles in the County of Suffolk, in the Peerage of the United Kingdom, which gave him and his descendants an automatic seat in the House of Lords.

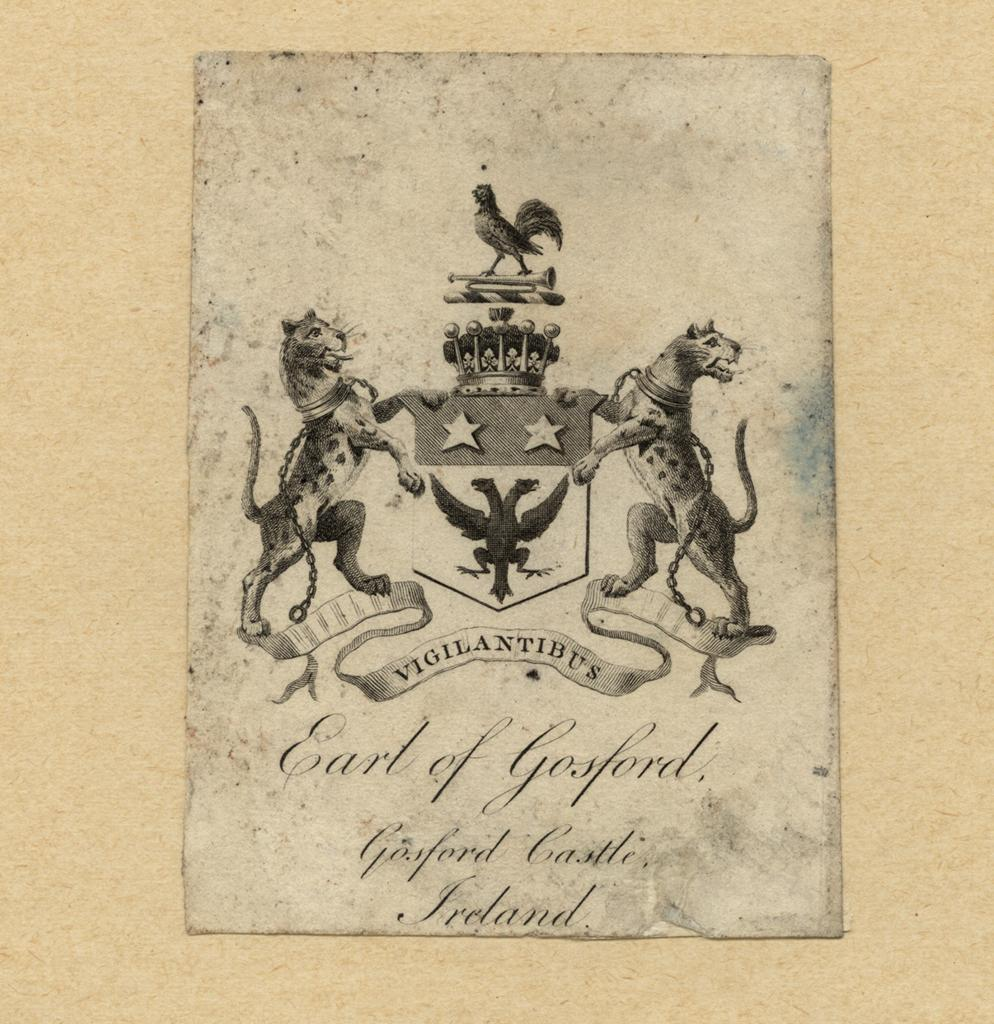
Bookplate showing the coat of arms of Acheson, Earl of Gosford

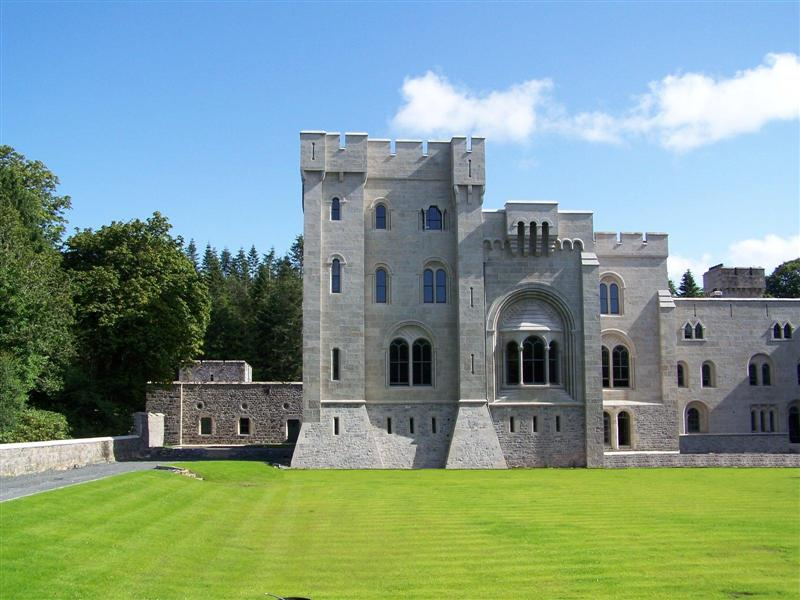
Gosford Castle, County Armagh

He was succeeded by his son, the third Earl. He represented County Armagh in the House of Commons from 1831 to 1847. The latter year, two years before he succeeded his father in the earldom, he was raised to the Peerage of the United Kingdom in his own right as Baron Acheson, of Clancairny in the County of Armagh. His son, the fourth Earl, served as Lord-Lieutenant of County Armagh and was also a Lord of the Bedchamber to the Prince of Wales and Vice-Chamberlain of the Household to Her Majesty Queen Alexandra. He was succeeded by his eldest son, the fifth Earl. He was a colonel in the Coldstream Guards and fought in the Second Boer War and in the First World War. His eldest son, the sixth Earl, sat on the Conservative benches in the House of Lords and served under Harold Macmillan as a Lord-in-waiting (government whip in the House of Lords) from 1958 to 1959. As of 2014 the titles are held by his only son, the seventh Earl, who succeeded in 1966.

The family seat was Gosford Castle, near Markethill, County Armagh.

== Acheson baronets, of Glencairny (1628) ==
- Sir Archibald Acheson, 1st Baronet (died 1634)
- Sir Patrick Acheson, 2nd Baronet (c. 1611–1638)
- Sir George Acheson, 3rd Baronet (1629–1685)
- Sir Nicholas Acheson, 4th Baronet (c. 1656–1701)
- Sir Arthur Acheson, 5th Baronet (1688–1749)
- Sir Archibald Acheson, 6th Baronet (1718–1790) (created Viscount Gosford in 1785)

== Viscounts Gosford (1785) ==
- Archibald Acheson, 1st Viscount Gosford (1718–1790)
- Arthur Acheson, 2nd Viscount Gosford (c. 1745–1807) (created Earl of Gosford in 1806)

== Earls of Gosford (1806) ==
- Arthur Acheson, 1st Earl of Gosford (c. 1745–1807)
- Archibald Acheson, 2nd Earl of Gosford (1776–1849)
- Archibald Acheson, 3rd Earl of Gosford (1806–1864)
- Archibald Acheson, 4th Earl of Gosford (1841–1922)
- Archibald Charles Montagu Brabazon Acheson, 5th Earl of Gosford (1877–1954)
- Archibald Alexander John Stanley Acheson, 6th Earl of Gosford (1911–1966)
- Charles David Alexander John Sparrow Acheson, 7th Earl of Gosford (born 1942).

The heir presumptive is the present holder's first cousin Nicholas Hope Carter Acheson (born 1947).
His father Patrick Acheson was the son of the 5th Earl and brother of the 6th Earl. The heir presumptive's heir apparent is his son Eric James Patrick Acheson (born 1988).

== See also ==
- Peerage of Britain and Ireland by date
- Peerage of Great Britain
- Peerage of the United Kingdom
