= Atchison (surname) =

Atchison is a surname. Notable people with this surname include:

- Bob Atchison (born 1941), Canadian drag racer
- Dave Atchison (born 1979), American drummer and musician
- David Rice Atchison (1807–1886), US senator from Missouri
- Don Atchison (born 1952), Canadian politician
- Doug Atchison, American motion picture director and screenwriter
- Jim Atchison, American business executive of SeaWorld Parks & Entertainment
- John Atchison (1954–2007), Assistant US Attorney and children's sports coach arrested on suspicion of soliciting sex with a 5-year-old girl
- Michael Atchison (1933–2009), Australian cartoonist
- Ron Atchison (1930–2010), Canadian football defensive lineman
- Scott Atchison (born 1976), American former professional baseball pitcher
- Scott Atchison (racing driver) (born 1962), former American racing driver
- Tim Atchison (born 1987), former American football safety
- William Atchison (1996–2017), perpetrator of the 2017 Aztec High School shooting

== See also ==
- Atchison (disambiguation)
