= Richard Boyle (MP, died 1711) =

Irish politician

Richard Boyle (b 1655 Kingsale; d 1711 Dublin ) was an Irish politician.

The son of Richard Boyle, Bishop of Ferns and Leighlin, he was educated at Trinity College, Dublin. From 1695 until 1699, he was MP for Old Leighlin.
