= Acheson =

Acheson may refer to:

- Acheson, Alberta, a locality and industrial area in Alberta, Canada
- Acheson (surname), people with the surname Acheson
- Acheson Irvine (1837–1916), Canadian policeman

== See also ==
- Atchison (disambiguation)
