= Edward Cooke (1755–1820) =

British politician and pamphleteer

Edward Cooke (27 June 1755 – 19 March 1820) was a British politician and pamphleteer.

== Family and early life ==
He was born at Denham, Buckinghamshire, the third but only surviving son of William Cooke (1711–1797), provost of King's College, Cambridge and his wife, Catherine, the daughter of Richard Sleech, a canon of St George's Chapel, Windsor. He was educated at Eton and King's College, Cambridge, graduating with a BA in 1777 and MA in 1785, being a fellow of the college from 1776 to 1786.

== Ireland ==
Cooke entered government service in 1778, as private secretary to Sir Richard Heron, the Chief Secretary for Ireland while John Hobart, 2nd Earl of Buckinghamshire was Lord Lieutenant of Ireland. He served in a series of posts in the Irish administration and parliament, becoming under-secretary for the military department in 1789–1796 and for the civil department from 1796–1801. In this period, he was also Member of Parliament (MP) for the boroughs of Lifford (1789–90) and Old Leighlin (1789–1801). He prospered because he was clever and ready to support British policy. He had an extremely poor opinion of the Irish judiciary, and sent jaundiced letters to London describing nearly all of them as insolent, ignorant or biased.

He published several political pamphlets during the 1790s. However, his position became difficult during the passage of the Irish Act of Union, because he favoured relief to Catholics. This determined him to return to England. While in London in 1801, negotiating the augmentation of the Irish Secret Service Fund, he was in negotiation with Lord Pelham over his future employment and Pelham's under-secretary, but a row broke out over the respective role of the Home Secretary and the Lord Lieutenant. The Lord Lieutenant consented to his retirement, and he received sinecure posts worth £2000 per year, including Keeper of the records of the Irish parliament.

== Politics in Britain ==
Following his return to England, Cooke remained unemployed until 1804, when he was appointed Under-Secretary of State for War and the Colonies under Lord Camden and then Viscount Castlereagh. His career then followed Castlereagh's to the Foreign Office. He went with him to Vienna and to Italy in the winter of 1814–15 to support Castlereagh in peace negotiations and partly to negotiate with the Papal States over the Catholic Question. In 1817, he retired, much to his chief's regret.

== Private life ==
Cooke married, on 10 August 1791, Isabella, the daughter of Hamilton Gorges of Kilbrew, Co. Meath, an Irish MP. There were no children. He died in 1820.

Parliament of Ireland
Preceded by Abraham Creighton; Sir Nicholas Lawless	Member of Parliament for Lifford; 1789–1790; With: Abraham Creighton	Succeeded by Abraham Creighton; Viscount Creighton
Preceded by Sir Edward Leslie; Arthur Acheson	Member of Parliament for Old Leighlin; 1790–1801; With: Arthur Acheson 1790–1791; Patrick Duigenan 1791–1798; Sir Boyle Roche 1798–1801	Succeeded by Parliament of the United Kingdom
Political offices
Preceded by John Sullivan	Under-Secretary of State for War and the Colonies; 1804–1806	Succeeded by Sir George Shee and Sir James Cockburn
Preceded by Sir George Shee and Sir James Cockburn	Under-Secretary of State for War and the Colonies; 1807–1809; With: Charles Stewart	Succeeded by Frederick John Robinson and Charles Jenkinson
Preceded by Culling Charles Smith	Under-Secretary of State for Foreign Affairs; 1812–1817	Succeeded by Joseph Planta
