= Patrick Duigenan =

Irish politician

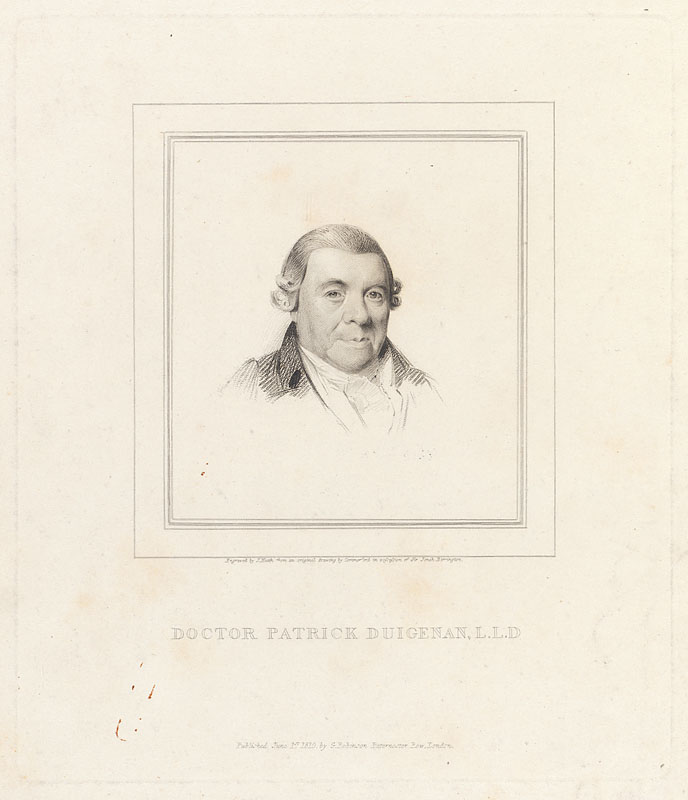
Patrick Duigenan.

Patrick Duigenan, PC (I) KC, FTCD (1735–11 April 1816), Irish lawyer and politician, was the son of a Leitrim Catholic farmer surnamed Ó Duibhgeannáin.

Through the tuition of the local Protestant clergyman, who was interested in the boy, he got a scholarship in 1756 at Trinity College, Dublin, and subsequently became a fellow. At some point he joined the Anglican faith. He studied law at the Middle Temple, was called to the Irish bar in 1767 and obtained a rich practice, mainly in the area of law relating to tithes. At that time tithes were levied from the majority Roman Catholic population for the benefit of the minority Church of Ireland, and were consequently unpopular. In spite of his Anglican convictions, he provided his Catholic wife with a chapel at their home and arranged for a priest to say Mass for her on Sundays. He opposed the Maynooth Grant and was appointed Grand Secretary of the Orange Order in 1801.

He is remembered, however, mainly as a politician, on account of his opposition to Grattan, his support of the Union, and his violent antagonism to Catholic emancipation, both in the Irish House of Commons and in pamphlets. As a Member of Parliament (MP), he represented Old Leighlin one of the Bishop’s boroughs of the Irish Parliament between 1791 and 1798 and subsequently Armagh Borough until 1801. He sat then for Armagh City in the first Parliament of the United Kingdom. He was a member of the Privy Council of Ireland from 1808 and a well-known character at Westminster until he died on 11 April 1816.

He had married twice; firstly around 1782, to Angelina, daughter of Thomas Berry of Eglish Castle, King's County, and secondly, on 2 October 1807, Hester Watson, the widow of George Heppenstall, solicitor to the Dublin police, of Sandymount. He had no children by either marriage.

== See also ==
- Clan O Duibhgeannain

== Notes ==
Parliament of Ireland
Preceded by Edward Cooke; Hon. Arthur Acheson	Member of Parliament for Old Leighlin; 1790–1798; With: Hon. Arthur Acheson; Edward Cooke	Succeeded by Edward Cooke; Sir Boyle Roche, 1st Bt
Preceded by Sackville Hamilton; Robert Hobart, Lord Hobart	Member of Parliament for Armagh Borough; 1798–1801; With: Hon. Thomas Pelham 1798–1799; Gerard Lake 1799–1801	Succeeded by Parliament of the United Kingdom
Parliament of the United Kingdom
New constituency	Member of Parliament for Armagh City; 1801–1816	Succeeded by Daniel Webb Webber
