= Arthur Acheson, 1st Earl of Gosford =

Irish politician (died 1807)

The Right Honourable The Earl of Gosford PC
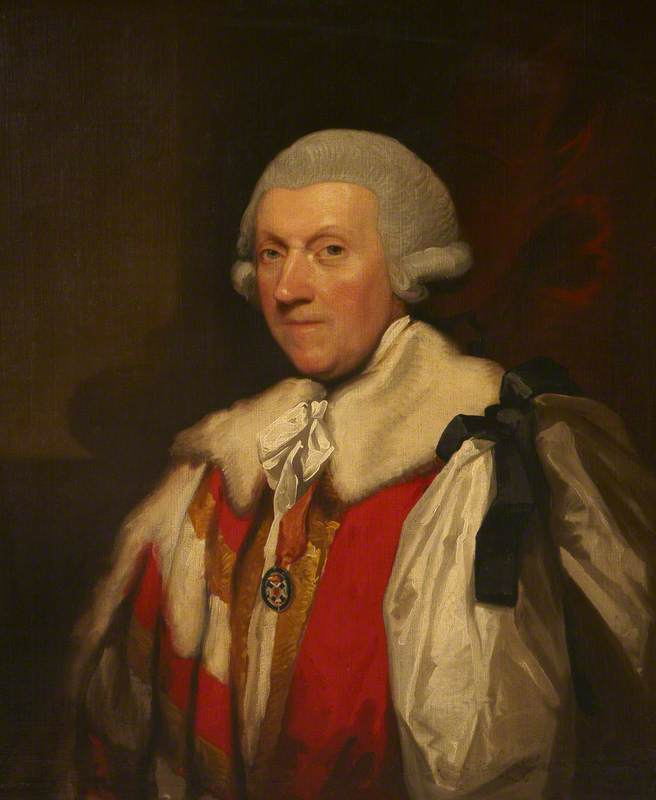
- The Earl of Gosford by Gilbert Stuart

Member of Parliament for Old Leighlin
- In office 1783–1791
- Preceded by: Robert Jephson; Sir John Blaquiere
- Succeeded by: Edward Cooke; Patrick Duigenan

Personal details
- Born: Arthur Acheson c. 1744-5
- Died: 14 January 1807 (aged 61–62) Bath, England
- Spouse: Millicent Pole (m. 1774)
- Relations: Arthur Acheson, 5th Baronet (grandfather)
- Children: Archibald Acheson, 2nd Earl of Gosford
- Parent(s): Archibald Acheson, 1st Viscount Gosford; Mary Richardson

Arthur Acheson, 1st Earl of Gosford PC (c. 1744/5 – 14 January 1807), known as The Viscount Gosford between 1790 and 1806, was an Irish peer of Scottish descent and politician.

== Early life ==
Arthur Acheson was born c. 1744-5. He was the eldest son of Archibald Acheson, 1st Viscount Gosford and his wife, the former Mary Richardson.

His paternal grandfather was Sir Arthur Acheson, 5th Baronet, and his maternal grandfather was John Richardson of Rich Hill. His father succeeded to the baronetcy in 1748 upon the death of his father, and was subsequently created Baron Gosford in 1776 and Viscount Gosford in 1785.

== Career ==
Acheson was a Member of Parliament (MP) for Old Leighlin from 1783 until 1791. He served as governor of County Armagh at the time of the Armagh disturbances of 1795 and denounced the Protestant extremists:

It is no secret that a persecution is now raging in this country ... the only crime is ... profession of the Roman Catholic faith. Lawless banditti have constituted themselves judges ... and the sentence they have denounced ... is nothing less than a confiscation of all property, and an immediate banishment.

Upon the death of his father in 1790, Arthur succeeded to the viscountcy. He was subsequently created Earl of Gosford in February 1806.

== Personal life ==
In 1774, Gosford married Millicent Pole, daughter of Lieutenant-General Edward Pole (who was descended from the Poles of Radbourne Hall in Derbyshire) and Olivia (née Walsh) Pole (a daughter and heiress of John Walsh of Ballykilcavan). Their children were:

- Lady Olivia Acheson (1775–1863), who married Brig. Gen. Robert Bernard Sparrow of Brampton Park in 1797.
- Archibald Acheson, 2nd Earl of Gosford (1776–1849), who married Mary Sparrow, only daughter and heiress of Robert Sparrow of Worlingham Hall.
- Hon. Edward Acheson CB (d. 1828), a captain in the Coldstream Guards and collector at the port of Dublin.
- Lady Mary Acheson (1787–1843), who married Lt. Gen. Lord William Cavendish Bentinck, second son of William Cavendish-Bentinck, 3rd Duke of Portland, in 1803.
- Lady Millicent Acheson, who married the Rev. J. H. Barber, rector of Aston Sandford and perpetual curate of St James's Chapel, Brighton, in 1826.

They were also the parents of two more sons, Arthur Acheson and Arthur Pole Acheson, who both died young. Lord Gosford died on 14 January 1807. His widow, Lady Gosford, died on 1 November 1825.

Parliament of Ireland
Preceded by Robert Jephson; Sir John Blaquiere	Member of Parliament for Old Leighlin; 1783–1791; With: Hon. Henry Luttrell 1783–1787; Sir Edward Leslie, 1st Bt 1787–1790; Edward Cooke 1790–1791	Succeeded by Edward Cooke; Patrick Duigenan
Peerage of Ireland
New creation	Earl of Gosford; 1806–1807	Succeeded by Archibald Acheson
Preceded by Archibald Acheson	Viscount Gosford; 1790–1807	Succeeded by Archibald Acheson
