= Eustace Budgell =

English-born Irish politician

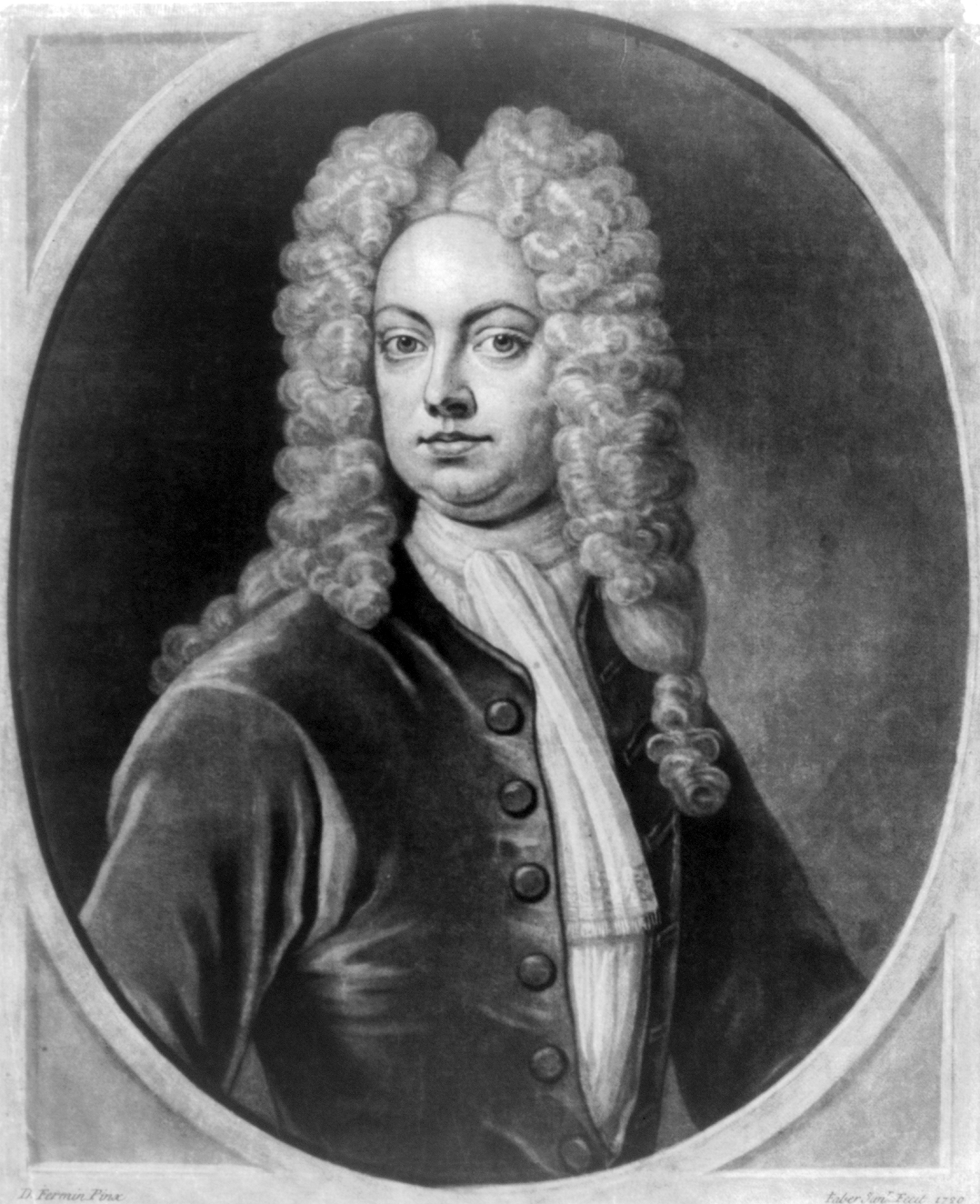
- Portrait of Budgell by John Faber the Younger, 1720
- Born: 19 August 1686; St Thomas, Exeter, Devon, England
- Died: 4 May 1737 (aged 50); London, England

Eustace Budgell (19 August 1686 – 4 May 1737) was an English writer and politician.

== Life and career ==
Born in St Thomas near Exeter, he was the son of Gilbert Budgell, D.D. by his first wife Mary, only daughter of Bishop William Gulston of Bristol, whose sister was wife of Lancelot, and mother of Joseph Addison. He matriculated 31 March 1705 at Trinity College, Oxford. He afterwards entered the Inner Temple, and was called to the bar but under the influence of Addison chose an alternative career.

Addison took him to Ireland and got him appointed to a lucrative office. However, when he lampooned the Viceroy, he lost his position.

Budgell assisted Addison with his magazine, The Spectator, writing 37 numbers signed X. In these he imitates Addison's style with some success. Between 1715 and 1727, he represented Mullingar in the Irish House of Commons.

Budgell, who was vain and vindictive, fell on evil days; he lost a fortune in the South Sea Bubble and was accused of forging the will of Dr Matthew Tindal at the expense of his nephew, Nicolas Tindal. Disliked by many, Budgell was criticized by Alexander Pope in the Epistle to Dr Arbuthnot and in The Dunciad.

He committed suicide by throwing himself out of a boat at London Bridge. His suicide note famously said: "What Cato did, and Addison approved, cannot be wrong."

Parliament of Ireland
Preceded by Thomas Bellew; Charles Melville	Member of Parliament for Mullingar; 1715–1727; With: Thomas Bellew	Succeeded by Sir Arthur Acheson, 5th Bt; John Rochfort
