= Clarence Lionel Adcock =

United States Army general (1895–1967)

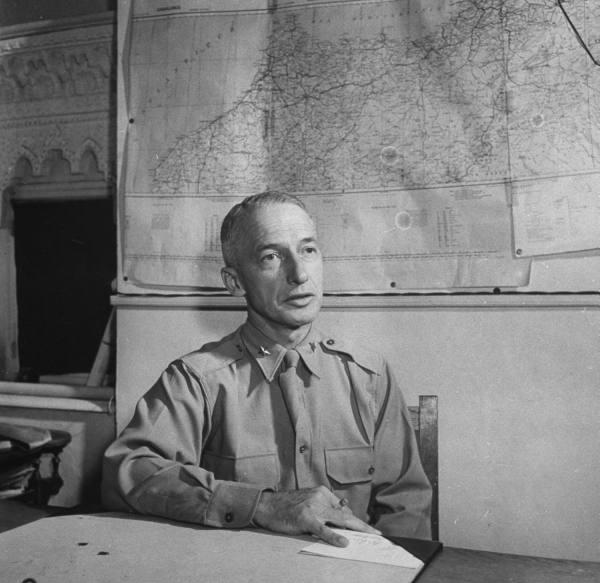
- Brigadier General Adcock in 1943
- Born: October 23, 1895; Waltham, Massachusetts, US
- Died: January 9, 1967 (aged 71); Tucson, Arizona, US
- Military career
- Branch: United States Army
- Service years: 1918–1949
- Rank: Major General
- Conflicts: World War I; World War II; Operation Torch; Operation Dragoon
- Awards: Distinguished Service Medal (3); Legion of Merit (2); Honorary Commander of the Order of the British Empire (United Kingdom); Officer of the Legion of Honor (France); Croix de Guerre avec palmes (France)

Clarence Lionel Adcock (October 23, 1895 – January 9, 1967) was a United States Army officer during World War II.

== Early life ==
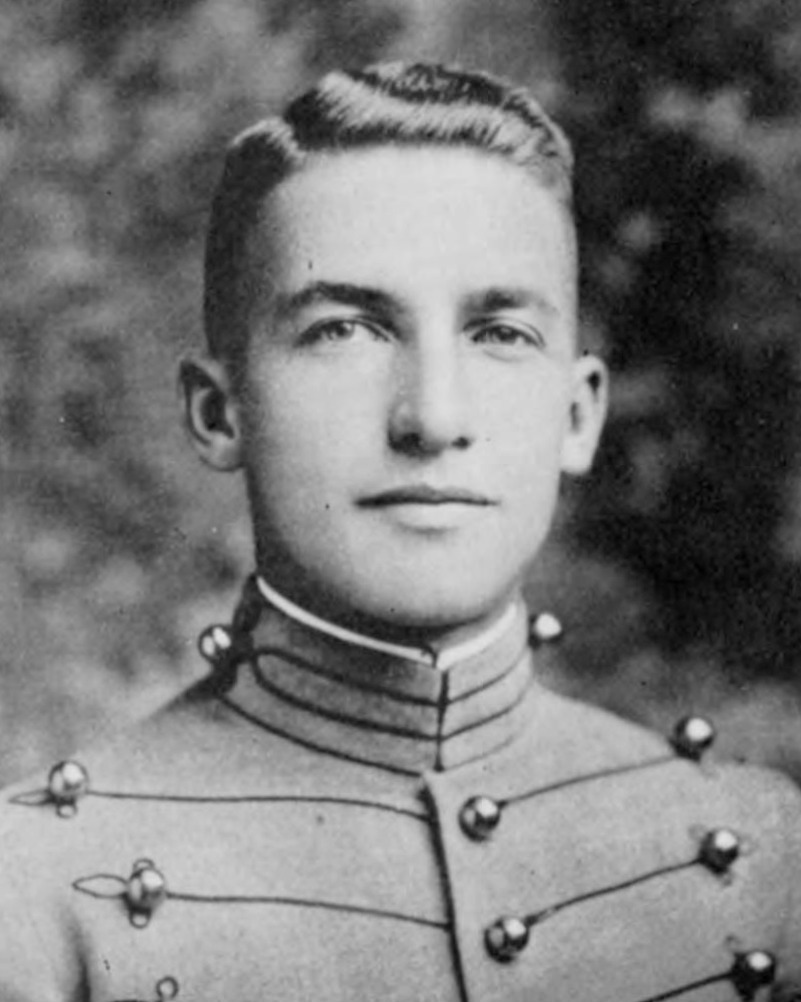
At West Point in 1918

He was born in Waltham, Massachusetts, and attended the United States Military Academy from 1915 - 1918. Lucius D. Clay, William M. Miley, Edwin L. Sibert, James C. Marshall, Hugh John Casey were among his fellow graduates.

== Military career ==
Commissioned into the Corps of Engineers in 1918, Adcock served as G-4 (supplies and logistics) to II Corps in the Mediterranean Theater in 1942, before performing the same duties for the Fifth Army. In 1943, he was on the staff of Allied Forces Headquarters and then with the Sixth Army Group until the end of the war in Europe.

In June 1945, he was appointed Deputy to the Assistant Chief of Staff, Headquarters, U.S. Forces, European Theater (USFET); and then was appointed Assistant Chief of Staff in July 1945. He served as Director of the Office of Military Government for the U.S. Zone in Germany from October 1945 to March 1946, and as Assistant Deputy Military Governor for Operations and Deputy to the Commanding General Lucius D. Clay, Office of Military Government for Germany, from April to October 1946.

Adcock retired from active duty in 1947, but was recalled to serve as the U.S. Chairman of the Bipartite Control Office, part of the Military Government in Germany.

== Awards ==
Adcock received a number of awards for his service, including the Distinguished Service Medal, Legion of Merit with Bronze Oak Leaf Cluster, Honorary Commander of the Order of the British Empire and the Croix de Guerre avec palmes.

== Personal life ==
He married Inez Elise Genrich on March 5, 1947.

== Death and legacy ==
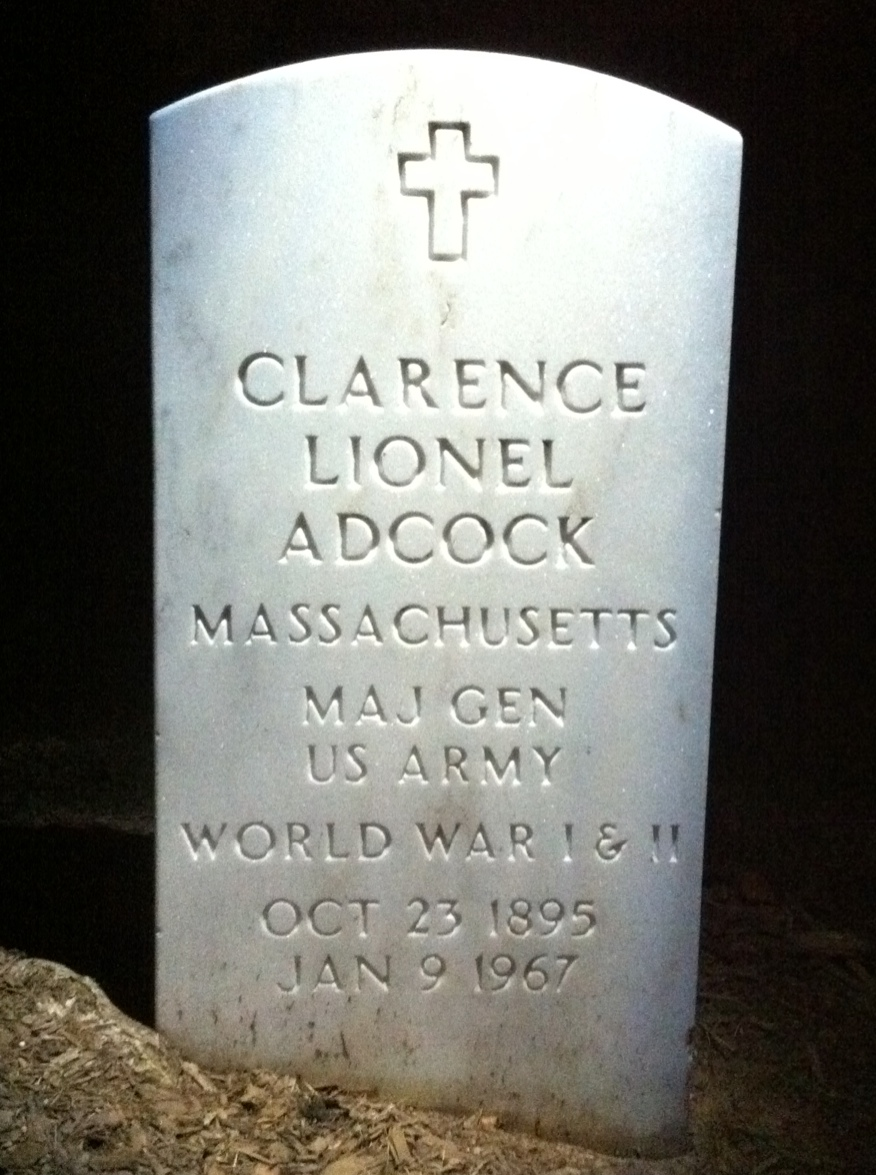
Clarence Lionel Adcock gravestone at Arlington National Cemetery

He retired again in 1949, and died in Tucson, Arizona, on January 9, 1967. He is interred in Arlington National Cemetery, in Virginia.
