= Ern Aitchison =

Australian rules footballer, born 1905

Personal information
- Full name: Ernest Arthur Aitchison
- Born: 10 June 1905; Timor, Victoria
- Died: 25 January 1991 (aged 85); Burwood, Victoria
- Original team: East Hawthorn
- Height: 184 cm (6 ft 0 in)
- Weight: 78 kg (172 lb)

Playing career^{1}
Years	Club	Games (Goals)
1931	Hawthorn	2 (0)
- ^{1} Playing statistics correct to the end of 1931.

Ernest Arthur Aitchison (10 June 1905 – 25 January 1991) was an Australian rules footballer who played with Hawthorn in the Victorian Football League (VFL).
