= Archibald Acheson, 1st Viscount Gosford =

Irish peer and politician (1718-1790)

Archibald Acheson 1st Viscount Gosford PC (Ire) (1 September 1718 – 5 September 1790), known as Sir Archibald Acheson, 6th Bt from 1748 to 1776, was an Irish peer and politician.

== Life ==
The son of Sir Arthur Acheson, Bt, he succeeded to the baronetcy upon the death of his father, and was subsequently created Baron Gosford in 1776 and Viscount Gosford in 1785. Acheson entered the Irish House of Commons for Dublin University in 1741, as a Member of Parliament until 1761. Subsequently, he represented County Armagh until 1776. In 1768, he was also elected for Killyleagh but chose to sit for County Armagh. Between 1776 and 1777, he represented Enniskillen. He was appointed High Sheriff of Armagh in 1751 and High Sheriff of Cavan in 1761. Between 1756 and 1761, he was Deputy Governor of County Armagh and on 7 May he was sworn into the Privy Council of Ireland.

== Family ==
He married Mary Richardson in 1740, with whom he had the following children:

- Hon Nichola Acheson
- Arthur Acheson, 1st Earl of Gosford (c. 1742–1807)

He was the father of Hon. Anna Maria Acheson, whose mother is not mentioned.

Parliament of Ireland
Preceded by Philip Tisdall; John Elwood	Member of Parliament for Dublin University; 1741–1761; With: Philip Tisdall	Succeeded by Philip Tisdall; William Clement
Preceded by William Brownlow; Francis Caulfeild	Member of Parliament for County Armagh; 1761–1776; With: William Brownlow	Succeeded by William Brownlow; Thomas Dawson
Preceded by John Blackwood; John Congreve	Member of Parliament for Killyleagh; 1768–1769; With: Viscount Ikerrin	Succeeded by Viscount Ikerrin; Arthur Johnston
Preceded by Richard Gorges-Meredyth; Hugh Henry Mitchell	Member of Parliament for Enniskillen; 1776–1777; With: John Leigh	Succeeded by John Leigh; Henry Flood
Peerage of Ireland
New creation	Viscount Gosford; 1785–1790	Succeeded by Arthur Acheson
New creation	Baron Gosford; 1776–1790	Succeeded by Arthur Acheson
Baronetage of Nova Scotia
Preceded by Arthur Acheson	Baronet (of Glencairny); 1748–1790	Succeeded by Arthur Acheson
