= Atchison =

Atchison may refer to:

== Places ==
In the United States:

- Atchison, California, a former settlement
- Atchison, Kansas, a city
- Atchison County, Kansas
- Atchison County, Missouri

== Other uses ==
- Atchison (surname), a list of people with this surname
- Atchison, Topeka and Santa Fe Railway, a former railway company from 1859 to 1996 serving the western half of the United States
- "On the Atchison, Topeka and the Santa Fe", an Academy Award-winning song which refers to the railroad

== See also ==
- Acheson (disambiguation)
