= W. Joseph Aitchison =

Canadian officer

Colonel Joe Aitchison OMM, CD

Colonel of the Regiment of the Royal Canadian Regiment
- In office February 25, 2011 – June 18, 2018
- Succeeded by: Ivan Fenton

Personal details
- Born: William Joseph Aitchison; December 5, 1941
- Died: August 21, 2025 (aged 83) Belleville, Ontario, Canada
- Children: 3
- Education: Royal Military College of Canada
- Occupation: Soldier

Military service
- Allegiance: Canada
- Branch/service: Canadian Army
- Years of service: 1959 - 1996; 2011-2015
- Rank: Colonel
- Unit: Royal Canadian Regiment; The Essex and Kent Scottish Regiment

Colonel William Joseph (W.J.) "Joe" Aitchison, OMM, CD (December 5, 1941 - August 21, 2025) was a Canadian military officer, and former Colonel of the Regiment for the Royal Canadian Regiment. He was also a security consultant and member of the board of directors of several organizations. He received the 2008 J.J. Kelso Award from the Hastings Children's Aid Society for his work with the Ontario Association of Children's Aid Societies.

== Life ==
Aitchison attended the Royal Military College of Canada and graduated with the class of 1963. Throughout Aitchison's career he held several command appointments, including being the Commanding Officer of 2nd Battalion of The RCR, Commandant of the Canadian Forces School of Infantry and Base Commander of CFB London, ON.

Aitchison had three sons, retired Master Warrant Officer Alan Aitchison, CD, Major General D. Craig Aitchison, CD, and Daniel, and five grandchildren, Justin, Colin, Kayla, Callie, and Alicia. Son Craig is a currently serving member of the Canadian Forces, while son Alan and grandson Justin are former serving members. Craig is also an officer in The Royal Canadian Regiment and also commanded the Infantry School (2009–11), perhaps the first father-son to command the same unit in the Regiment's, if not Army's, history.

Aitchison became the new Colonel of the Royal Canadian Regiment on February 25, 2011. On June 18, 2015, Aitchison handed over this position to his successor, Major-General (Retired) J.I. Fenton, OMM, CD.

He resided in Southern Ontario.

== Honours and decorations ==
Aitchison received the following orders and decorations during his military career:

Ribbon bars of William Joseph Aitchison
OMM, CD

Ribbon	Description	Notes
	Order of Military Merit (OMM)	Officer 1 June 1995
	Order of Saint John	1992
	Special Service Medal	With Peace Bar
	Canadian Peacekeeping Service Medal	
	United Nations Peacekeeping Force in Cyprus	
	125th Anniversary of the Confederation of Canada Medal	1992
	Queen Elizabeth II Diamond Jubilee Medal	2012; Canadian Version of this Medal
	Canadian Forces' Decoration (CD)	With 3 Clasps
