= Low-frequency radio range =

Navigation system formerly used by aircraft

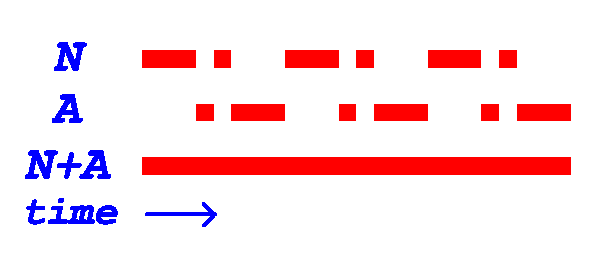
Low-frequency radio range audio signals: N stream, A stream and combined uniform tone (simulated sounds)

The low-frequency radio range, also known as the four-course radio range, LF/MF four-course radio range, A-N radio range, Adcock radio range, or commonly "the range", was the main navigation system used by aircraft for instrument flying in the 1930s and 1940s, until the advent of the VHF omnidirectional range (VOR), beginning in the late 1940s. It was used for en route navigation as well as instrument approaches and holds.

Based on a network of radio towers which transmitted directional radio signals, the radio range defined specific airways in the sky. Pilots navigated using low-frequency radio by listening to a stream of automated "A" and "N" Morse codes. For example, they would turn or slip the aircraft to the right when hearing an "N" stream ("dah-dit, dah-dit, ..."), to the left when hearing an "A" stream ("di-dah, di-dah, ..."), and fly straight ahead when these sounds merged to create a constant tone indicating the airplane was directly tracking the beam.

As the VOR system was phased in around the world, low-frequency radio range was gradually phased out, mostly disappearing by the 1970s. There are no remaining operational facilities today. At its maximum deployment, there were over 400 stations exclusively using low-frequency radio range in the Continental U.S. alone.

== History ==
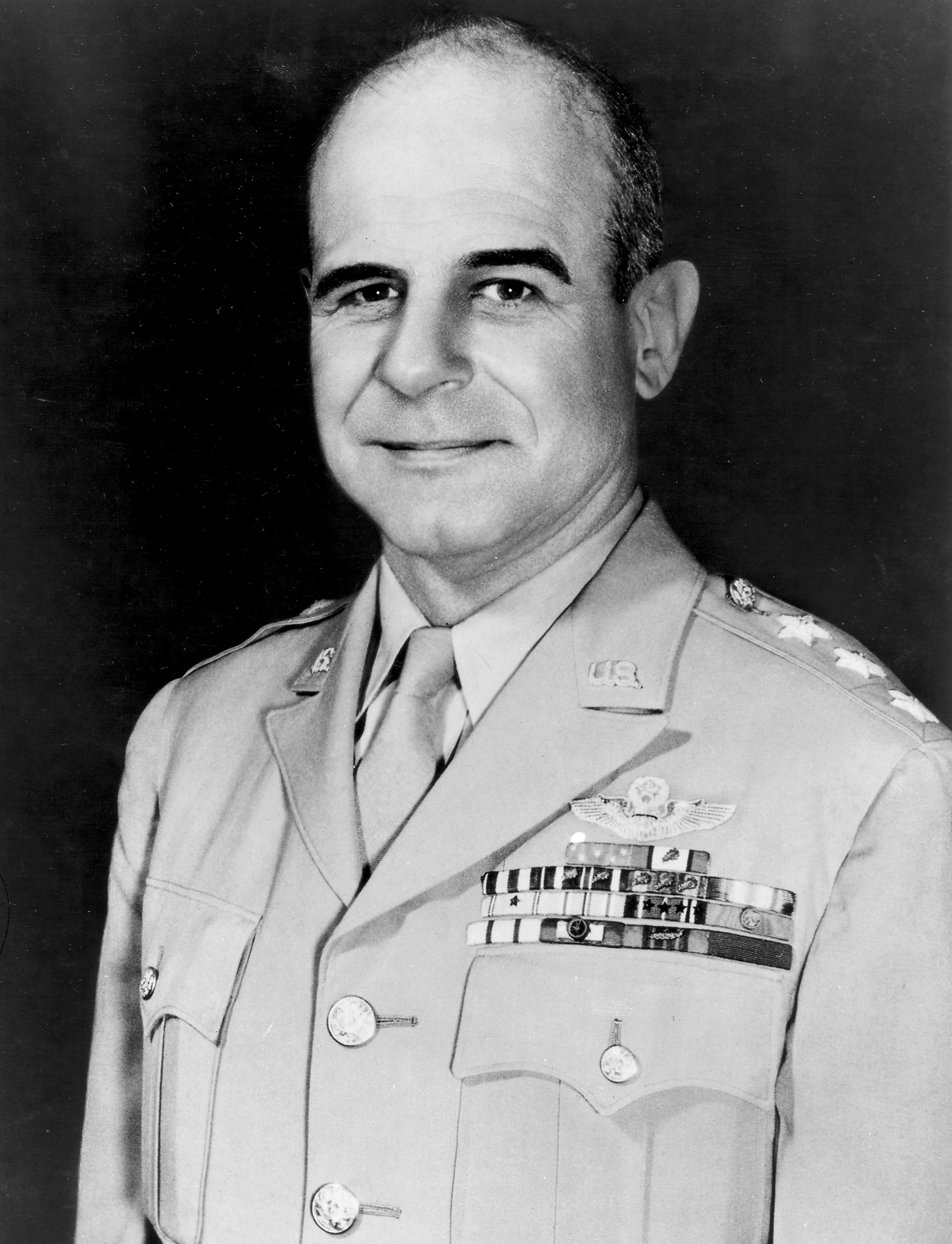
Jimmy Doolittle demonstrated in 1929 that instrument flying is feasible.

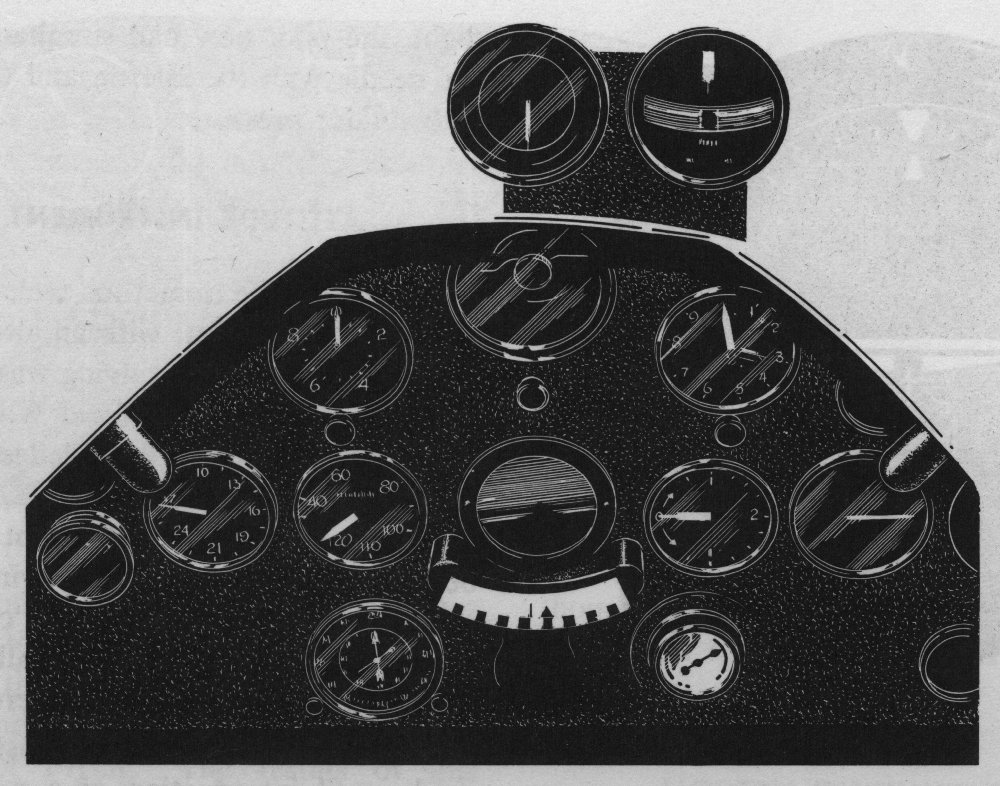
Doolittle's instrument panel

After World War I, aviation began to expand its role into the civilian arena, starting with airmail flights. It soon became apparent that for reliable mail delivery, as well as the passenger flights which were soon to follow, a solution was required for navigation at night and in poor visibility. In the U.S., a network of lighted beacons, similar to maritime lighthouses, was constructed for the airmail pilots. But the beacons were useful mostly at night and in good weather, while in poor visibility conditions they could not be seen. Scientists and engineers realized that a radio based navigation solution would allow pilots to "see" under all flight conditions, and decided a network of directional radio beams was needed.

On September 24, 1929, then-Lieutenant (later General) James H. "Jimmy" Doolittle, U.S. Army, demonstrated the first "blind" flight, performed exclusively by reference to instruments and without outside visibility, and proved that instrument flying was feasible. Doolittle used newly developed gyroscopic instruments—attitude indicator and gyrocompass—to help him maintain his aircraft's attitude and heading, and a specially designed directional radio system to navigate to and from the airport. (Note: Doolittle also used a standard turn and bank instrument which was relatively common by the time of his flight.) Doolittle's experimental equipment was purpose-built for his demonstration flights; for instrument flying to become practical, the technology had to be reliable, mass-produced and widely deployed, both on the ground and in the aircraft fleet.

There were two technological approaches for both the ground and air radio navigation components, which were being evaluated during the late 1920s and early 1930s.

On the ground, to obtain directional radio beams with a well-defined navigable course, crossed loop antennas were used initially. The Ford Motor Company developed the first commercially workable application of a loop-based, low-frequency radio range. They installed it at their Dearborn and Chicago fields in 1926 and filed the patent for it in 1928. Earlier concepts for the system were developed in Germany in 1906 which were later experimented with by the US Bureau of Standards and Army Signal Corps in the early 1920s. The technology was quickly adopted by the U.S. Commerce Department, who set up a demonstration range on June 30, 1928, and the first series of stations entered service later that year. But the loop antenna design generated excessive horizontally polarized skywaves that could interfere with the signals, especially at night. By 1932, the Adcock antenna array eliminated this problem by only having vertical antennae and it became the preferred solution. The U.S. Commerce Department's Aeronautics Branch referred to the Adcock solution as the "T-L Antenna" (for "Transmission Line") and did not initially mention Adcock's name.

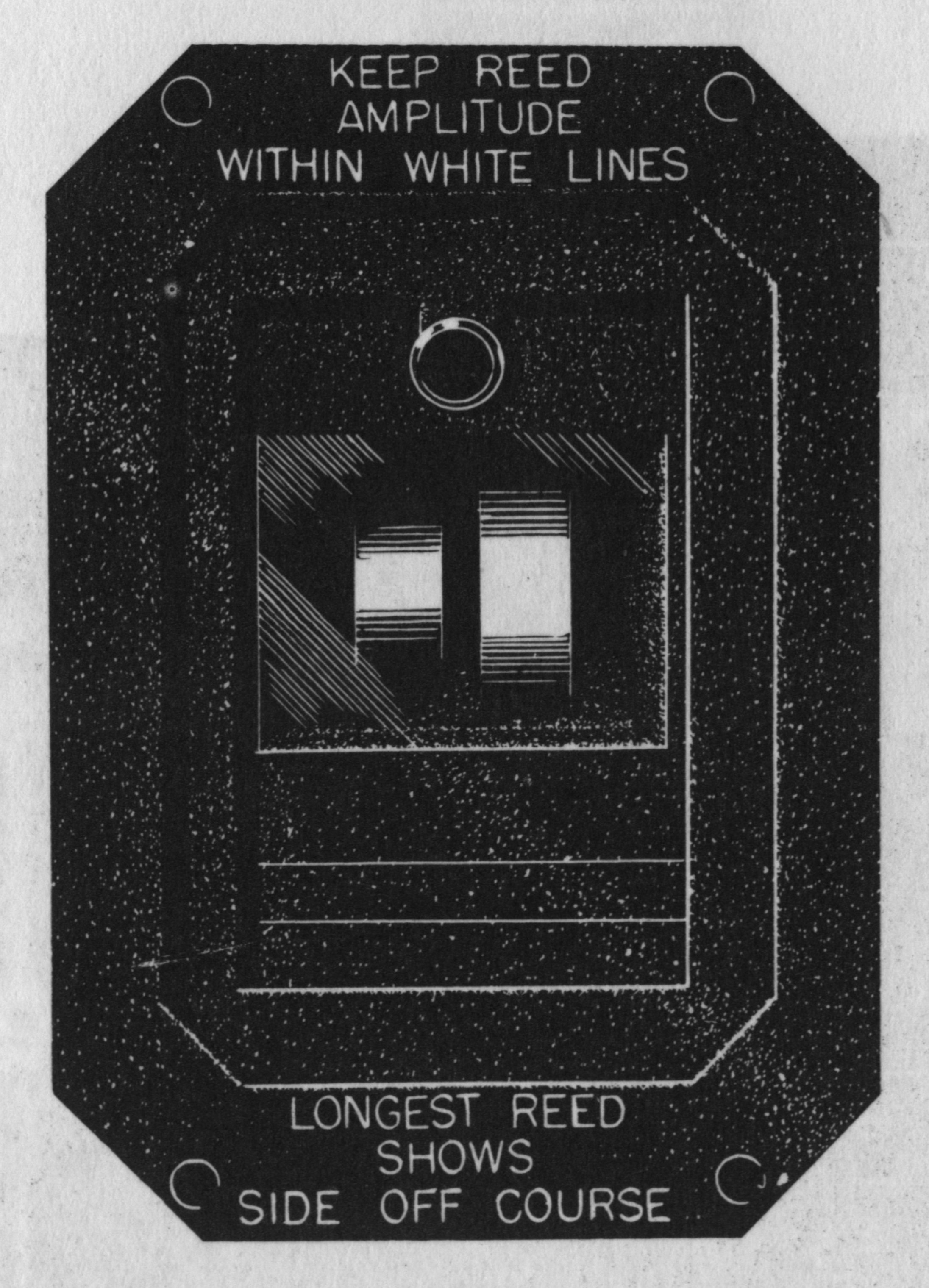
The vibrating reed, developed in the 1920s, was a simple, panel-mounted instrument with "turn left-right" indicator.

In the air, there were also two competing designs, originating from groups of different backgrounds and needs. The Army Signal Corps, representing military aviators, preferred a solution based on a stream of audio navigation signals, constantly fed into the pilots' ears via a headset. Civilian pilots on the other hand, who were mostly airmail pilots flying cross-country to deliver the mail, felt the audio signals would be annoying and difficult to use over long flights, and preferred a visual solution, with an indicator in the instrument panel.

A visual indicator was developed based on vibrating reeds, which provided a simple panel-mounted "turn left-right" indicator. It was reliable, easy to use and more immune to erroneous signals than the competing audio based system. Pilots who had flown with both aural and visual systems strongly preferred the visual type, according to a published report. The reed-based solution was passed over by the U.S. government, however, and the audio signals became standard for decades to come.

By the 1930s, the network of ground-based, low-frequency radio transmitters, coupled with affordable on-board AM radio receivers, became a vital part of instrument flying. Low-frequency radio transmitters provided navigational guidance to aircraft for en route operations and approaches under virtually all weather conditions, helping to make consistent and reliable flight schedules a reality.

The radio range remained as the main radio navigation system in the U.S. and other countries until it was gradually replaced by the much-improved VHF-based VOR technology, starting in the late 1940s. The VOR, still used today, includes a visual left-right indicator.

== Technology ==
=== Ground ===
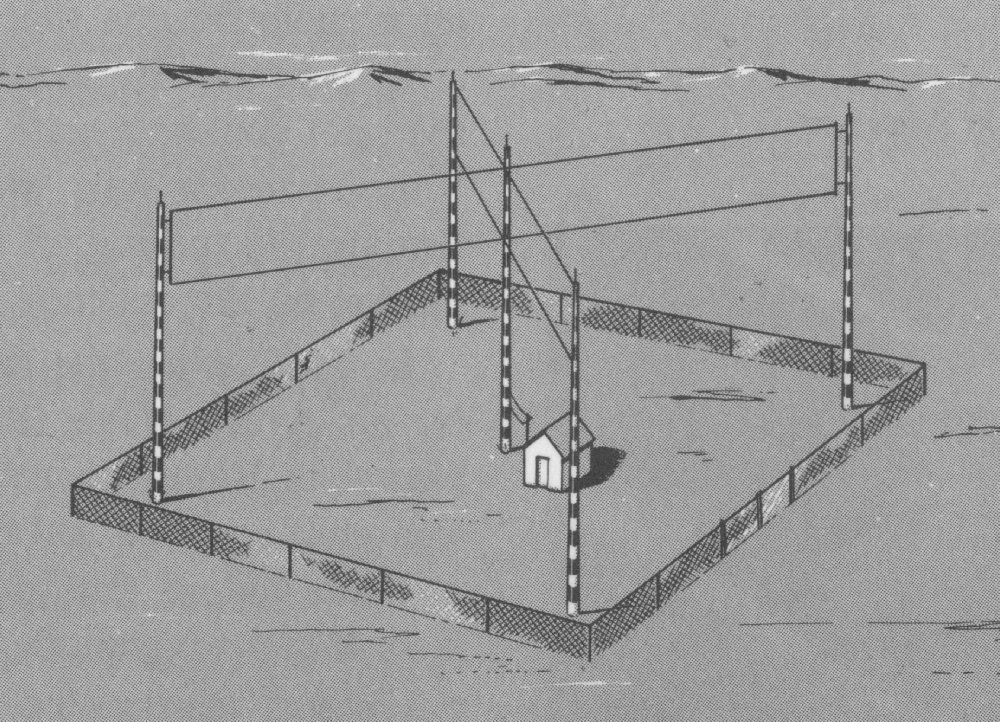
Early low-frequency radio station based on crossed loop antennas; later installations used Adcock antennas for improved performance.

The low-frequency radio ground component consisted of a network of radio transmission stations which were strategically located around the country, often near larger airports, approximately 200 miles apart. Early low-frequency stations used crossed loop antennas, but later designs for many stations used the Adcock vertical antenna array for improved performance, especially at night.

Each Adcock range station had four 134-foot-tall (41 m) antenna towers erected on the corners of a 425 × 425 ft square, with an optional extra tower in the center for voice transmission and homing. The stations emitted directional electromagnetic radiation at 190 to 535 kHz and from 50 to 1,500 watts, into four quadrants. (Note: According to international standards, the frequency band below 300 kHz is "Low Frequency", and above that "Medium Frequency". Since LFR frequencies "straddled" the dividing line between the two bands, they were technically called "Low Frequency/Medium Frequency (LF/MF) Radio Range" stations.) The radiation of one opposing quadrant pair was modulated (at an audio frequency of 1,020 Hz) with a Morse code for the letter A (· —), and the other pair with the letter N (— ·). (Note: In the U.S. the quadrant which included the true north radial was designated as N (if a course leg was exactly on true north, then the northwest quadrant became N); in Canada, N was the quadrant which included the 045° true radial.) The intersections between the quadrants defined four course lines emanating from the transmitting station, along four compass directions, where the A and N signals were of equal intensity, with their combined Morse codes merging into a steady 1,020 Hz audio tone. These course lines (also called "legs"), where only a tone could be heard, defined the airways.

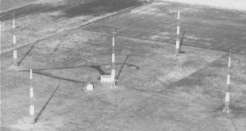
Adcock range station. The central fifth tower was typically used for voice transmissions.

In addition to the repeating A or N modulation signal, each transmitting station would also transmit its Morse code identifier (typically 2 or 3 letters) once every thirty seconds for positive identification. The station identification would be sent twice: first on the N pair of transmitters, then on the A, to ensure coverage in all quadrants. (Note: Since the station identification was transmitted in sequence, first on the N and then the A antenna pairs, it would be heard by the pilot once or twice, possibly with different relative amplitudes, depending on aircraft location. For example, it would be heard twice when on the beam, and only once when inside a quadrant.) Also, in some installations local weather conditions were periodically broadcast in voice over the range frequency, preempting the navigational signals, but eventually this was done on the central fifth tower. (Note: Pilots had to request to stop the weather report if they were using the LFR for an approach.)

The low-frequency radio range was originally accompanied by airway beacons, which were used as a visual backup, especially for night flights. Additional "marker beacons" (low power VHF radio transmitters) were sometimes included as supplementary orientation points.

=== Air ===
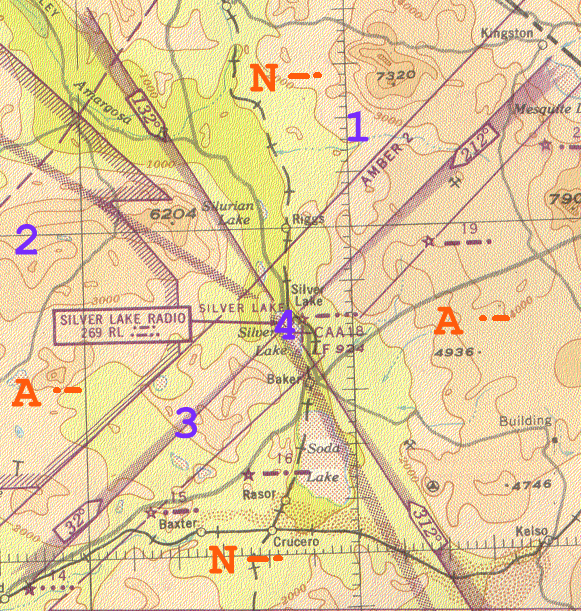
Chart of Silver Lake low-frequency radio (269 kHz). Aircraft at location 1 would hear: "dah-dit, dah-dit, ...", at 2: "di-dah, di-dah, ...", at 3: a steady tone, and at 4: nothing (cone of silence). (Note: Every 30 seconds, Silver Lake station's Morse code identifier, "di-dah-dit di-dah-di-dit" (R-L), would preempt the navigation signals.)

The airborne radio receivers—initially simple amplitude modulation (AM) sets—were tuned to the frequency of the low-frequency radio ground transmitters, and the Morse code audio was detected and amplified into speakers, typically in headsets worn by the pilots. The pilots would constantly listen to the audio signal, and attempt to fly the aircraft along the course lines ("flying the beam"), where a uniform tone would be heard. If the signal of a single letter (A or N) became audibly distinct, the aircraft would be turned as needed so that the modulation of the two letters would overlap again, and the Morse code audio would become a steady tone. The "on course" region, where the A and N audibly merged, was approximately 3° wide, which translated into a course width of ±2.6 miles when 100 miles away from the station.

Pilots had to verify that they were tuned to the correct range station frequency by comparing its Morse code identifier against the one published on their navigation charts. They would also verify they were flying towards or away from the station, by determining if the signal level (i.e., the audible tone volume) was getting stronger or weaker. (Note: The pilot would have to disable the Automatic Gain Control (AGC) when assessing relative signal strength.)

== Approaches and holds ==
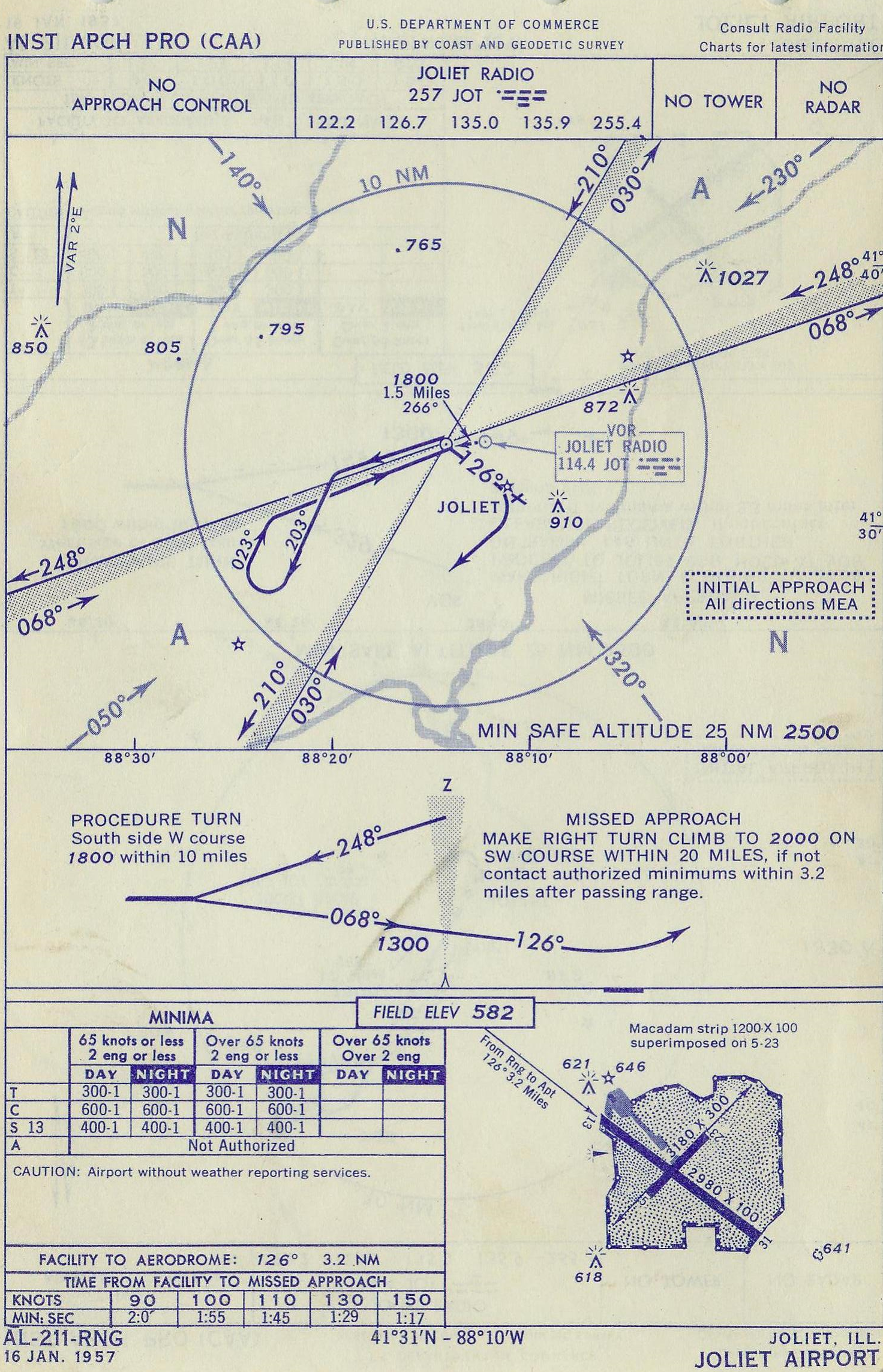
Joliet, IL low-frequency radio instrument approach procedure

Final approach segments of low-frequency radio instrument approaches were normally flown near the range station, which ensured increased accuracy. When the aircraft was over the station, the audio signal disappeared, since there was no modulation signal directly above the transmitting towers. This quiet zone, called the "cone of silence", signified to the pilots that the aircraft was directly overhead the station, serving as a positive ground reference point for the approach procedure.

In a typical low-frequency radio instrument approach procedure, final approach would begin over the range station, with a turn to a specific course. The pilot would descend to a specified minimum descent altitude (MDA), and if the airport was not in sight within a specified time (based on ground speed), a missed approach procedure would be initiated. In the depicted Joliet, IL, low-frequency radio approach procedure, minimum descent altitude could be as low as 300 feet AGL, and required minimum visibility one mile, depending on aircraft type.

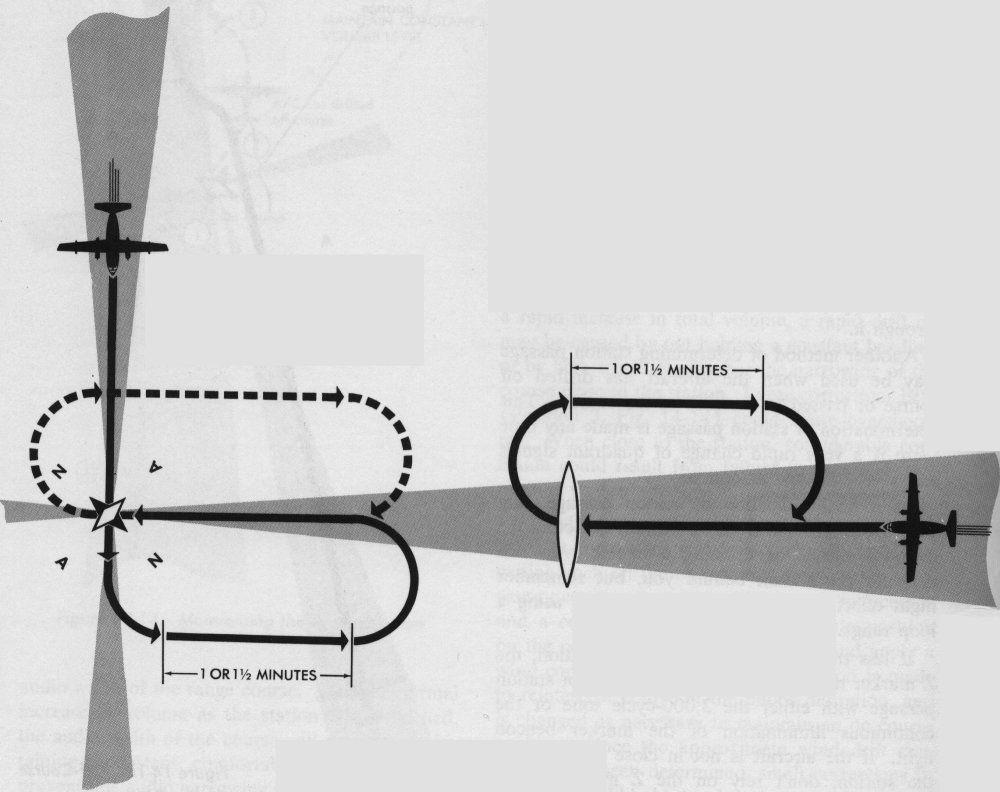
Diagram showing low-frequency radio holding patterns.

The low-frequency radio range also allowed air traffic control to instruct pilots to enter a holding pattern "on the beam", i.e., on one of the low-frequency legs, with the holding fix (key turning point) over the low-frequency radio station, in the cone of silence or over one of the fan markers. The holds were used either during the en route portion of a flight or as part of the approach procedure near the terminal airport. Low-frequency radio holds were more accurate than non-directional beacon (NDB) holds, since NDB holding courses are predicated on the accuracy of the on-board magnetic compass, whereas the low-frequency radio hold was as accurate as the low-frequency radio leg, with an approximate course width of 3°.

== Non-directional beacons ==
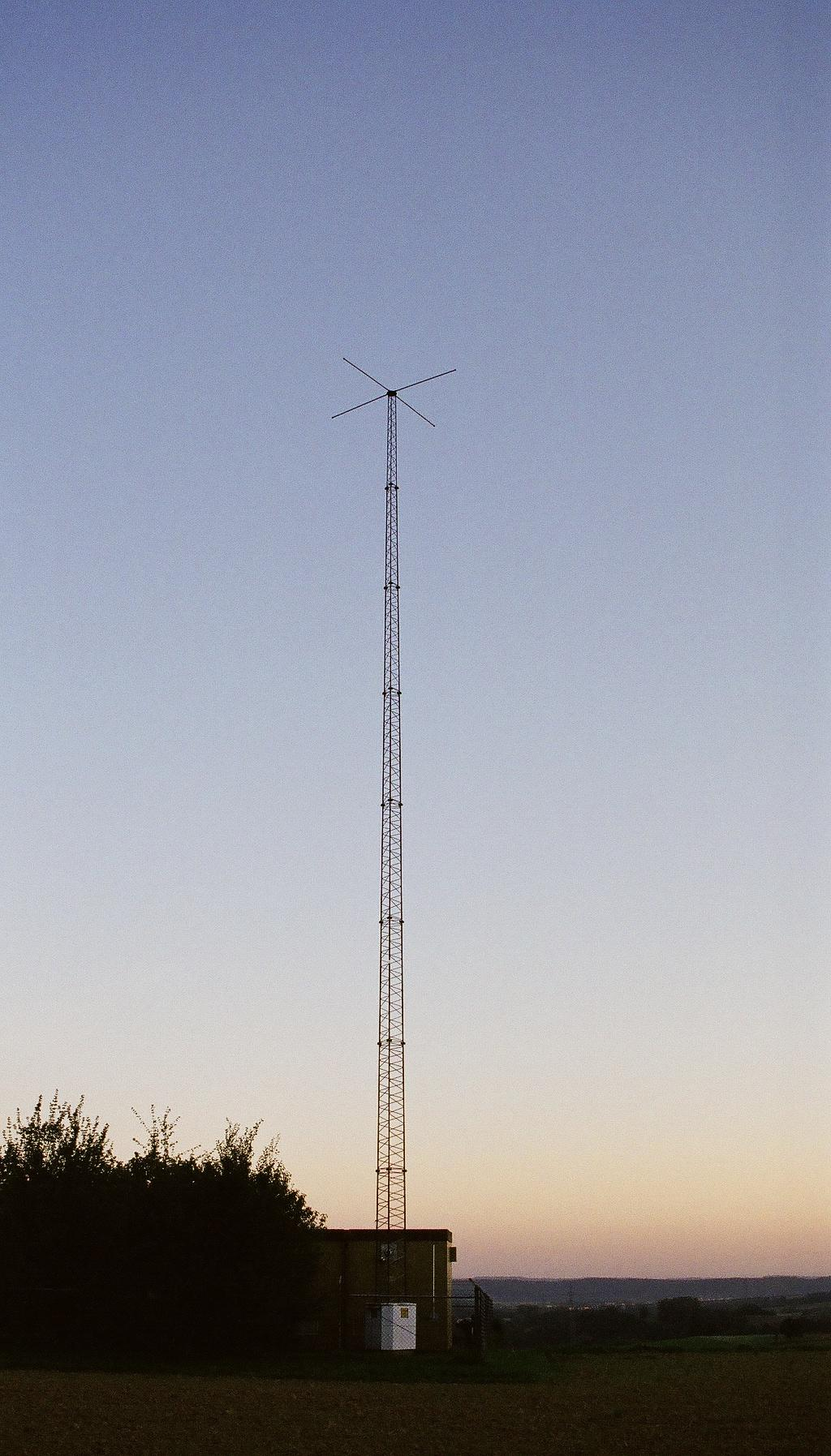
NDB ground installations are simple single tower antennas.

From its beginning in the early 1930s, the low-frequency radio was augmented with low-frequency non-directional beacons (NDBs). While the low-frequency radio required a complex ground installation and only a simple AM receiver on board the aircraft, NDB ground installations were simple single-antenna transmitters requiring somewhat more complex equipment on board the aircraft. The NDB's radio emission pattern was uniform in all directions in the horizontal plane. The NDB's on-board receiver was called a radio direction finder (RDF). The NDB-RDF combination allowed pilots to determine the direction of the NDB ground station relative to the direction the airplane was pointing. When used in conjunction with the on board magnetic compass, the pilot could navigate to or from the station along any chosen course radiating from the station.

Early RDF receivers were costly, bulky and difficult to operate, but the simpler and less expensive ground installation allowed the easy addition of NDB based waypoints and approaches, to supplement the low-frequency radio system. Modern RDF receivers, called "automatic direction finders" (or "ADF") are small, low cost and easy to operate. The NDB-ADF system remains today as a supplement and backup to the newer VOR and GPS navigation systems, although it is gradually being phased out. All questions regarding NDB/ADF operation were removed from FAA pilot certification testing materials prior to October 2017.

== Limitations ==
Although the low-frequency radio system was used for decades as the main aeronautical navigation method during low visibility and night flying, it had some well-known limitations and drawbacks. Pilots had to listen to the signals, often for hours, through the early generation headsets of the day. The course lines, which were a result of a balance between the radiation patterns from different transmitters, would fluctuate depending on weather conditions, vegetation or snow cover near the station, and even the airborne receiver's antenna angle. Under some conditions, the signals from the A quadrant would "skip" into the N quadrant (or vice versa), causing a false "virtual course" away from any real course line. Also, thunderstorms and other atmospheric disturbances would create electromagnetic interference to disrupt the range signals and produce crackling "static" in the pilots' headsets.

== Replacement by VOR ==
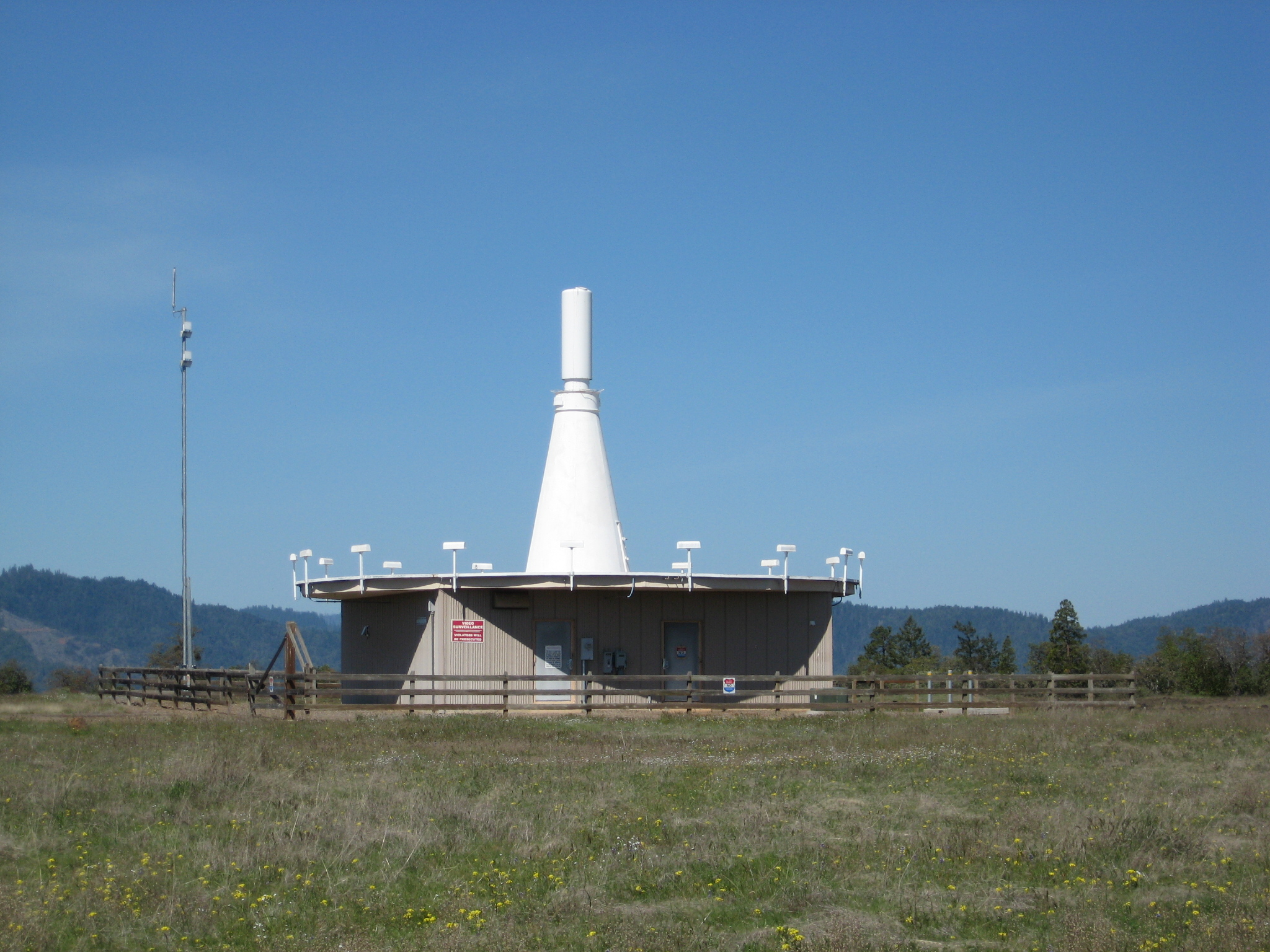
The VHF-based VOR technology superseded low-frequency radio by the 1960s.

The low-frequency radio navigation system required, at a minimum, only a simple AM radio receiver on board the aircraft to accurately navigate the airways under instrument meteorological conditions, and even execute an instrument approach to low minimums. (Note: Basic flight instruments would still be needed.) On the downside, however, it had only four course directions per station, was sensitive to atmospheric and other types of interference and aberrations, and required pilots to listen for hours to an annoying monotonous beep, or a faint stream of Morse codes, often embedded in background "static". Its eventual replacement, the VHF band VOR navigation system, had many advantages. The VOR was virtually immune to interference, had 360 available course directions, had a visual "on course" display (with no listening needed), and was far easier to use. Consequently, when the VOR system became available in the early 1950s its acceptance was rapid, and within a decade the low-frequency radio was mostly phased out. VOR itself is gradually being phased out today in favor of the far superior Global Positioning System (GPS).

== Sounds ==
The following are simulated sounds for the Silver Lake low-frequency radio. The range station—located about 10 miles north of Baker, California—would preempt the navigational signals every 30 seconds to transmit its Morse code identifier ("RL"). The station identification would be heard once or twice, possibly with different relative amplitudes, depending on the aircraft location. Pilots would listen to and navigate by these sounds for hours while flying. Actual sounds contained "static", interference and other distortions, not reproduced by the simulation. Adjusting the volume would affect the effective course width. For example, in the simulated sound for "twilight" A below, where the aircraft is nearly on the beam but slightly inside the A quadrant, a low volume almost obscures the weak A sound, whereas a loud one makes it more distinct.

"Distinct" A
Inside A quadrant

"Distinct" N
Inside N quadrant

"On the beam"
A+N intersection

"Twilight" A
Slightly off beam in A

(See Wikipedia:Media help if you encounter problems playing these sound files.)

== See also ==
- SCR-277
