= Peerage of Britain and Ireland by date =

From the early Middle Ages until early modern times, the nobility was the true basis of power for the English crown. The peerage was where the king would turn for military, judicial and administrative purposes, and the ruler who ignored his nobility, like Edward II, did so at great risk to his position. The peerage can perhaps best be compared to the cabinets of modern-day Prime Ministers or Presidents, though their power and responsibilities were much wider. The emergence of Parliament did not seriously erode the power of the nobility until, at the earliest, the 17th century.

Below can be found lists of the Peerage of England and Ireland during selected years of the Middle Ages. Though this approach naturally will exclude certain important individuals, the lists still work as snap-shots of the elite of the nation at regular intervals during the Middle Ages.

Up until 1340, when the first dukedom was created (1337), the lists only include Earls. From 1390 Marquessates are also included (1385), and from 1450 Viscountcies (1446).
