= Alfred Adcock =

English cricketer

Cricket information
- Batting: Right-handed
- Bowling: Right-arm medium-fast

Career statistics
Competition	First-class
Matches	5
Runs scored	89
Batting average	9.88
100s/50s	0/0
Top score	27
Balls bowled	60
Wickets	1
Bowling average	29
5 wickets in innings	0
10 wickets in match	0
Best bowling	1/29
Catches/stumpings	2/–
- Source: CricketArchive, 6 December 2022

Robert Alfred Adcock (3 November 1916 – 18 March 2005) was an English first-class cricketer. He was a right-handed batsman and a right-arm medium-pace bowler who played first-class cricket for Leicestershire in 1938. He was born in Ibstock and died in Leicester.

Adcock played for just one County Championship season, making his debut against Warwickshire in a rain-interrupted draw. Adcock played four further matches during the 1938 season, and was never on the winning side in a County Championship game. Three of the five first-class games in which Adcock participated were lost by an innings margin. Adcock was a lower-middle order batsman.

Adcock bowled just ten overs in his first-class career, and the following year, played in the Minor Counties Championship for Lincolnshire. He died at the age of 88.
