= Richard Neville Hadcock =

English historian of medieval architecture

Richard Neville Hadcock (1895-1980) FRSA FRHistS, was a historian whose main area of study was ecclesiastical buildings, particularly mediaeval monastic buildings, in the United Kingdom and the Republic of Ireland. His work in this field also included the drawing up of maps of the locations of the various sites.

== Early life ==
Hadcock was born in 1895 in Newcastle upon Tyne. His father, Sir Albert George Hadcock (1861-1936), was a distinguished engineer, who was made a Fellow of the Royal Society and appointed Knight Commander of the British Empire in 1918. Hadcock senior married Sibylla Rideout in 1889, the marriage registered at Marylebone, London.

Hadcock was educated at Marlborough College and, at the end of his time there, he was due to go up to Oxford University. The outbreak of war in 1914 changed his plans and he enlisted in the army and saw fighting on the Western Front. During the war he suffered from the effects of gas and other illnesses. He was Mentioned in Dispatches in 1917 and saw service through to 1918 when he was invalided out of the Army.

In the summer of 1926 Hadcock married Jeanne Josephine La Pajolec, the marriage registered in Hexham, Northumberland. The couple had one daughter, Josephine Belfrage (1927-2014), and three sons, Richard Neville (1928-2005), Michael (1930-2018) and George (1930-2007).

== Working life ==
Engaging in private study after the war Hadcock produced a body of work on ecclesiastical buildings of Great Britain and the Irish Republic. His collaboration with Dom David Knowles and Father Aubrey Gwynne, Society of Jesuits, as well as his own writings and map making, made a considerable contribution to the study of monasticism in the mediaeval period. Hadcock's involvement with Father Gwynne in the writing of 'Mediaeval Houses: Ireland' is revealed in correspondence between the two and suggests that Hadcock's involvement was significant.

Photographs attributed to Hadcock appear in the Conway Library collection at the Courtauld Institute of Art. This collection of glass and film negatives, as well as prints, comprises mainly ecclesiastical and secular architecture. It is in the process of being digitised as part of the wider 'Courtauld Connects' project.

Hadcock died in 1980, his death registered in the Wokingham District, Berkshire.

== Publications ==
=== As author ===
- Hadcock, Richard Neville (2019). "A map of mediaeval Northumberland and Durham". Archaeologia Aeliana. 16. doi:10.5284/1060019.
- Hadcock, R.N. (1950). Map of Monastic Britain (North Sheet). Chessington, Director General of the Ordnance Survey
- Hadcock, R.N. (1950). Map of Monastic Britain (South Sheet). Chessington, Director General of the Ordnance Survey
- Hadcock, R.N. (1936). Tynemouth Castle and Priory, Northumberland. London, H.M. Office of Works, Department of Ancient Buildings and Monuments, Official Guides. British Library General Reference Collection B.S. 46/2. (72.)
- Hadcock, R.N. (1947). Newbury Rural District Guide. London, Century Press. British Library General Reference Collection W.P. 1324/89
- Hadcock, R.N. (1947). The Official Guide to Bradfield Rural District, London, Century Press. British Library General Reference Collection W.P. 1324/53
- Hadcock, R.N., Maps of Scotland Showing Mediaeval Religious Houses in Easson D.E. (1957) Mediaeval Religious Houses: Scotland. The British Library Cartographic Items 4787.bb.9.
- Hadcock, R.N. (1979) The Story of Newbury. Newbury, Countryside Books. British Library General Collection X.700/26262

=== As contributor ===
- Gwynne, A. (1970) Medieval Religious Houses: Ireland: with an appendix to early sites. London, Longman. British Library General Collection X.100/8037
- Cowan, Ian B. (1976) Mediaeval Religious Houses: Scotland: with an appendix on the houses on the Isle of Man. London, Longman. British Library General Reference Collection X.200/20409
- Knowles, David (1953) Mediaeval Religious Houses: England and Wales. London, Longman. British Library General Reference Section X200/6347

== Awards ==
Hadcock was awarded a fellowship of the Royal Society of Arts in 1937 and was a member of the Royal Historical Society.
