= Alexander Aitchison =

- Born: May 20, 1850; Binghamton, New York
- Died: April 5, 1905 (aged 54)
- Occupation: Fire chief
- Known for: First full-time fire chief for the city of Hamilton, Ontario

Alexander Aitchison (May 20, 1850 – April 5, 1905) was the first full-time fire chief for the city of Hamilton, Ontario.

== Early life ==
Alexander Aitchison was born on May 20, 1850, at Binghamton, New York, to parents William and Janet. Although the family moved to Hamilton, Canada West, in 1853, Alexander returned to New York upon leaving school to become an apprentice carpenter. In 1870, Aitchison returned to Hamilton to take up a foreman's position in his father's planing mill and box factory. Soon after, he was taken into partnership with the firm, Aitchison and Company, in charge of the box department. However, in November 1877, Alexander became a volunteer with the Hamilton fire brigade. Despite his inexperience, Aitchison was appointed the city's first full-time engineer in January 1879.

== Fire chief position ==
At the time of Aitchison's appointment to the chief engineer role, the city of Hamilton was investigating the possibility of replacing the volunteer firefighters with a paid fire department. The council perceived the volunteer brigade as too autonomous and independent, and it was thought that creating a paid fire department would be a means of tightening control over the city's fire services. Although there were far more experienced candidates for the role of fire chief within Hamilton, Aitchison was appointed to that position in 1879 because he had not been a member of the fire brigade long enough to assimilate to its autonomous ways.

Many were opposed to Aitchison's appointment to the newly created role. In March 1879, a number of former volunteer firefighters publicly challenged his suitability, describing him as derelict during his time as a volunteer, and stating that he had failed to attend half of all call-outs. In response, a committee was formed to defend Aitchison in the press, and the Hamilton council backed their appointee. Once his position was secure, Aitchison began to address the reasons why the council had dispensed with the volunteer brigade. Membership of political parties was forbidden, as was the possession of alcoholic beverages or gambling in the fire hall. The firemen were prohibited from accepting tips from the public for their good work, and the entire force was required to wear a uniform. In 1881, the part-time firemen were dismissed. The next year, the town's first steam fire engine was purchased. At one point, Aitchison's fire department held the world record for harnessing and leaving the engine house.

Aitchison was a well-loved public figure. In 1889, a group of Hamilton citizens petitioned the council to raise his salary to $2,000, and members of the public were often present during demonstrations of the latest in firefighting technology. In 1904, Aitchison and his men were transported by freight train to Toronto to help fight the fire burning there. On April 5, 1905, Aitchison was killed after being thrown from his firefighting wagon on his way to attend a simple grass fire lit by boys playing with matches. After being thrown from the wagon, Aitchison fractured his head, hitting a statue of John A. Macdonald that he had once proclaimed to be dangerous. After his funeral service, thousands of Hamilton citizens lined the streets of the city on his way to the cemetery. He was succeeded by his wife, Martha, five sons, and three daughters.
