= Atchison, California =

Atchison was a post office in Contra Costa County, California. It was established in 1903, 1 mile (1.6 km) southeast of the Richmond post office. Atchison was named after the Atchison, Topeka, and Santa Fe Railroad which had its western terminus at Point Richmond. The post office was closed in 1911.
