= Cara Aitchison =

Scottish social scientist (born 1965)

Cara Aitchison FAcSS FRGS FHEA FLSW
- Born: Cara Carmichael Aitchison; 1965 (age 60–61); Falkirk, Scotland

Academic background
- Education: University of Edinburgh; Middlesex University; University of Bristol
- Thesis: Leisure Studies: Gender, Power and Knowledge (1999)

Academic work
- Discipline: Geography
- Sub-discipline: Human geography; social geography; cultural geography; sport; tourism; gender
- Institutions: Croydon College; University of Gloucestershire; University of West England; University of Bedfordshire; University of St Mark and St John; Cardiff Metropolitan University

Cara Carmichael Aitchison, FAcSS, FRGS, FHEA, FWLA, FLSW (born 1965) is a British social scientist and university leader. She was president and Vice Chancellor of Cardiff Metropolitan University from 2016 to 2024, and was formerly Vice-Chancellor and Chief Executive or Plymouth Marjon University in England (2013–2016). She was previously Dean of Moray House School of Education and Professor in Social and Environmental Justice at Edinburgh University in Scotland (2010–2013) and has an international research profile in the geography and cultural economy of leisure, sport and tourism and in gender studies, cultural identity and social inclusion.

== Early life and education ==
Aitchison was born on 5 February 1965 in Falkirk, Scotland. She grew up in Larbert and Stirling, attending Stirling High School from 1977 to 1983. She graduated with an undergraduate Master of Arts (MA Hons) in Geography from Edinburgh University in 1987 and went on to study a Postgraduate Diploma (PG Dip) in Recreation and Leisure Practice at the university's Moray House School of Education, graduating with Distinction in 1988 as she commenced her first lecturing position. Aitchison then undertook a teaching qualification with Thames Polytechnic (now Greenwich University) from 1988 to 1990, a Master of Arts (MA) in Gender and Society at Middlesex University from 1990 to 1993 and a PhD in Social Science, with her thesis titled Leisure Studies: Gender, Power and Knowledge, at the University of Bristol from 1996 to 1999, and with all three qualifications undertaken part-time while progressing her full-time academic career.

== Academic career ==
Aitchison taught for a year at Croydon College from 1988 to 1989 before being appointed Lecturer in Leisure Studies at the Polytechnic of North London in 1989 (which became the University of North London in 1991 and then London Metropolitan University in 2002). In 1990 she was promoted to Senior Lecturer in Leisure and Tourism Studies and Programme Director of the UK's largest degree programme in Leisure and Tourism Management, and then to Principal Lecturer and Subject Field Leader in Leisure and Tourism Studies in 1993.

During this period Aitchison became active in research and publishing and, in 1997, moved to the University of Gloucestershire to take up a newly established position of Senior Research Fellow in the Leisure and Sport Research Unit, then headed by the late Professor Celia Brackenridge OBE. Aitchison led the portfolio of postgraduate programmes in sport, leisure and tourism before becoming Reader in Leisure Policy and Cultural Theory in 1999 and then succeeding Professor Brackenridge as Head of the Research Unit in 2001.

In 2003 Aitchison was appointed Professor in Human Geography in the Department of Geography and Environmental Management at the University of the West of England in Bristol where she remained until 2008. Between 1997 and 2007 Aitchison published prolifically and also undertook numerous international research visits including, in 2003, a lecture tour of Iran speaking at international conferences and universities in Tehran, Ahvaz and Esfahan and sponsored by the Iranian Ministry of Culture, Iranian National Olympic Committee, Iranian Tourism Organisation, Iranian Physical Education Association and Iran Women's Sport Federation. Between 2000 and 2005 she also held the post of Visiting Lecturer at World Leisure's International Centre of Excellence at Wageningen University in the Netherlands, teaching on the UN-affiliated World Leisure programme MSc Leisure and Environments.

== Personal life ==
In 2003, Aitchison was diagnosed with ulcerative colitis with the disease progressing so rapidly that she almost retired on ill-health grounds in 2007. She underwent surgery in both 2003 and 2007 and had further surgery in early 2008, spending three months in hospital, after which she opted to change direction from research to senior leadership.

From the outset of her leadership career Aitchison has been open about both her health condition and her same-sex partnership. Although she has lived in Cardiff during her tenure as Vice-Chancellor, her main home is in Stirling in Scotland where she lives with her partner, Professor Gayle McPherson, director of the Centre for Culture, Sport and Events at the University of the West of Scotland.

== Leadership career ==
In 2008 Aitchison was appointed by Les Ebdon, Vice-Chancellor of the University of Bedfordshire, to lead the university's Bedford-based Faculty of Education and Sport. In 2010 she was appointed by Sir Timothy O’Shea as Head of Moray House School of Education and Professor in Social and Environmental Justice at Edinburgh University where she led an extensive programme of modernisation, internationalisation and growth following a significant reduction in Scottish Government funding for initial teacher education in 2010.

In 2013 Aitchison was appointed Vice-Chancellor and chief executive officer of Plymouth Marjon University immediately following the former University College's university designation. She led a programme of transformation, stabilising the university's finances and turning around a 2013 Ofsted judgement of ‘Requires Improvement’ to 'Good with Outstanding Features in Leadership and Management' a year later. The same year, the university was named the top UK university for social mobility (Graduate Social Mobility Index, 2014) and the following year she led the university to become only the fourth in the UK to receive accreditation for The Social Enterprise Mark (Social Enterprise Foundation, 2015), something which she repeated in 2018 at Cardiff Met when the university became the first in Wales to secure the accreditation. In 2016 Aitchison was appointed as the first female President and Vice-Chancellor in the history of Cardiff Metropolitan University, dating back to 1865. The university had only narrowly avoided a Welsh Government merger in 2011 when, in a report commissioned by Welsh Government and written by Steve Smith, then Vice-Chancellor of Exeter University, it was deemed to be in ‘a spiral of decline’. Appointed and supported by Barbara Wilding, chair and subsequently Chancellor of the university, Aitchison delivered a major transformation in the university's fortunes by leading a programme of extensive growth, diversification and improvement that saw the university's enrolments increase from circa 17,000 in 2017 to over 25,000 in 2023, turnover increase by over 50% from under £100m to over £150m, and annual research income double during the same period.

Aitchison's leadership of the transformation of Cardiff Met, including through the Covid pandemic, was recognised with the award of the UK's most prestigious higher education award, The Times Higher Education UK & Ireland University of the Year 2021 together with The Times and Sunday Times Welsh University of the Year 2021 and the ranking as the UK's most sustainable university with the award of ‘No. 1 UK University for Ethical and Environmental Sustainability’ in The People and Planet Green League 2022/23. The university was also deemed the most financially sustainable in Wales by the Wales Centre for Governance (2020).

== Publications ==
Aitchison's research, with a focus on social and environmental justice, has led to new theoretical perspectives in leisure, tourism, gender and disability studies and new policy impacts in rural planning, cultural strategy, tourism development, sport policy and leisure management.

Her research outputs include 10 books and over 200 chapters, journal articles, reports, and keynote papers presented in 25 countries spanning all five continents, with research funding awarded by the Economic and Social Research Council, the British Academy, national and local governments, UK disability charities, professional bodies, and renewable energy companies.

Aitchison's major books include her monograph Gender and Leisure: Social and Cultural Perspectives (Routledge 2003); her sole-edited Gender, Sport and Identity (Routledge 2007); Leisure and Tourism Landscapes: Social and Cultural Geographies (Routledge 2001), co-authored with Dr Nicola Macleod and Dr Stephen Shaw; and Geographies of Muslim Identities: Diaspora, Gender and Belonging (Ashgate 2007); co-edited with Professor Peter Hopkins and Professor Mei Po-Kwan. She has also published widely in the major leisure and tourism journals and served on the Editorial Boards of social science, leisure, sport and tourism journals including: Contemporary Social Science (2011–2015), Annals of Tourism Research (2009–2016), Leisure Studies (2007–2013), Equality, Diversity and Inclusion (2006–2013), Annals of Leisure Research (2004–2013), Research on Sports Science (2003–2005), Culture, Sport, Society (2002–2004), and the Journal of Hospitality, Leisure, Sport and Tourism Education (2001–2004).

== Roles ==
Aitchison's service in national and international education has included: Chair of The Wales-Ukraine Higher Education Group, leading Welsh universities’ response to the crisis in Ukraine (2021-); Chair of Universities UK's Sexual Misconduct Advisory Group, leading UK universities’ response to tackling sexual misconduct (2018–2022), Chair of The South East Wales Centre for Education in Teacher Training, leading initial teacher education across providers and developing a research-led teacher education partnership between Cardiff Metropolitan and the Universities of Cardiff and Oxford (2016–2018); Chair of The Scottish Teacher Education Committee on Career-Long Professional Learning, leading improvement in teacher education in Scottish universities (2011–2013); chair of the joint Funding Councils’ Research Excellence Framework 2014 Panel for Sport and Exercise Sciences, Leisure and Tourism (2010–2014); Chair of the international Leisure Studies Association (2002–2006); and Chair of the UN-sponsored World Leisure Commission on Women and Gender (2002–2008).

She has also undertaken a range of voluntary national and international leadership and ambassadorial roles and currently serves as a member of: the Board of Trustees of the Royal Botanic Gardens Edinburgh as a Scottish Government Public Appointment (2023-); the Council of the All Party Parliamentary (Universities) Group (2022-); the Europe Regional Committee of the Association of Commonwealth Universities (2020-); the Board of Cardiff Capital Region City Deal Economic Growth Partnership (2019); the Universities of Sanctuary Steering Group (2021-); and the Student Opportunity and Achievement Committee of the Higher Education Funding Council for Wales (2016-).

Previously, Aitchison served on the: Board of the Higher Education Statistics Agency (2022–23); Welsh Government Coast Path Review Group (2022); Council of the CBI Wales (2016–23); Board of the Arab European Leadership Education Network (2016–2019); Council of the Academy of Social Sciences (2015–21); Board of The Equality Challenge Unit, one of the organisations that merged to form Advance HE (2015–18); Board of Askel Veur Academies Trust for the Diocese of Truro Trust for 44 Church of England schools in Cornwall and the Isles of Scilly (2015–16); Board of Plymouth Culture (2014–16); Board of Plymouth Area Business Council (2014–16); The Scottish Government Commission on Rural Education (2011–2013); and The Scottish Teacher Education Committee (2010–13).

== Honours and awards ==
Aitchison has been recognised with the awards of Fellow of the Higher Education Academy (2001), Fellow of the Academy of Social Sciences (2003), Fellow of the Royal Geographical Society (2016), and Fellow of the Learned Society of Wales (2018). She has been an Honorary Professor at the University of Bath since 2015.

In January 2023 Aitchison announced that, after a 36-year full-time career in higher education, she would retire from her role as Vice-Chancellor at the end of January 2024 to focus on combining her academic background and leadership experience to contribute to social and environmental justice and international cultural diplomacy in education, sport and tourism. She will retain a fractional research post as professor of geography at Cardiff Metropolitan University.
