= Adcock antenna =

Type of radio antenna array, used mainly for early radio navigation

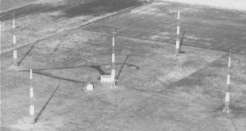
Adcock radio range ground station. Hundreds of these stations were deployed around the U.S. alone.

The Adcock antenna is an antenna array consisting of four equidistant vertical elements which can be used to transmit or receive directional radio waves.

The Adcock array was invented and patented by British engineer Frank Adcock and since his August 1919 British Patent No. 130,490, the 'Adcock Aerial' has been used for a variety of applications, both civilian and military. Although originally conceived for receiving low frequency (LF) waves, it has also been used for transmitting, and has since been adapted for use at much higher frequencies, up to ultra high frequency (UHF).

In the early 1930s, the Adcock antenna (transmitting in the LF/MF bands) became a key feature of the newly created radio navigation system for aviation. The low frequency radio range (LFR) network, which consisted of hundreds of Adcock antenna arrays, defined the airways used by aircraft for instrument flying. The LFR remained as the main aerial navigation technology until it was replaced by the VOR system in the 1950s and 1960s.

The Adcock antenna array has been widely used commercially, and implemented in vertical antenna heights ranging from over 40 m (130 feet) in the LFR network, to as small as 13 cm (5 inches) in tactical direction finding applications (receiving in the UHF band).

== Radio direction finding ==
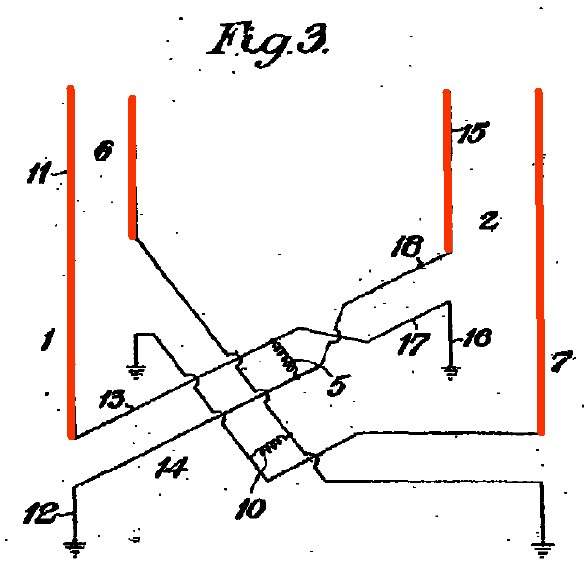
Diagram from Adcock's 1919 patent, depicting a four-element monopole antenna array; active antenna segments are marked in red.

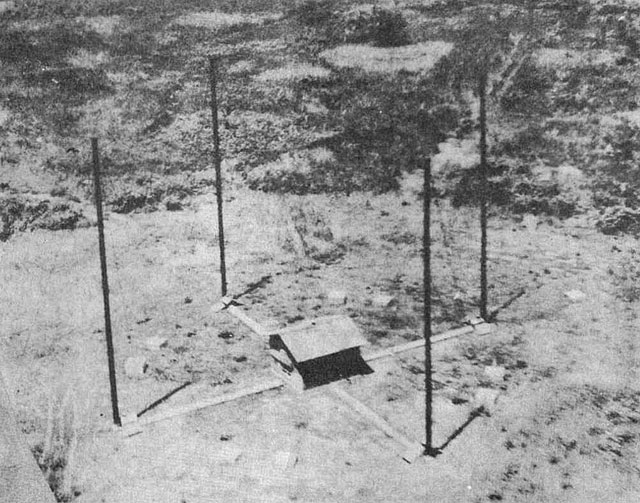
27-meter (90-foot) diagonal spacing Japanese Adcock direction finder installation for 2 MHz in Rabaul

Frank Adcock originally used the antenna as a receiving antenna, to find the azimuthal direction a radio signal was coming from in order to find the location of the radio transmitter; a process called radio direction finding.

Prior to Adcock's invention, engineers had been using loop antennas to achieve directional sensitivity. They discovered that due to atmospheric disturbances and reflections, the detected signals included significant components of electromagnetic interference and distortions: horizontally polarized radiation contaminating the signal of interest and reducing the accuracy of the measurement.

Adcock—who was serving as an Army officer in the British Expeditionary Force in wartime France at the time he filed his invention—solved this problem by replacing the loop antennas with symmetrically inter-connected pairs of vertical monopole or dipole antennas of equal length. This created the equivalent of square loops, but without their horizontal members, thus eliminating sensitivity to much of the horizontally polarized distortion. The same principles remain valid today, and the Adcock antenna array and its variants are still used for radio direction finding.

== Low frequency radio range ==
In the late 1920s, the Adcock antenna was adopted for aerial navigation, in what became known as the low frequency radio range (LFR), or the "Adcock radio range". Hundreds of transmitting stations, each consisting of four or five Adcock antenna towers, (Note: A fifth tower was often added in the center of the square for voice transmissions.) were constructed around the U.S. and elsewhere.

The result was a network of electronic airways, which allowed pilots to navigate at night and in poor visibility, under virtually all weather conditions. The LFR remained as the main aerial navigation system in the U.S. and other countries until the 1950s, when it was replaced by VHF-based VOR technology. By the 1980s all LFR stations were decommissioned.

== See also ==
- Direction finding
- Radio direction finder
- Huff-Duff
