= Old Leighlin (Parliament of Ireland constituency) =

Pre-1801 Irish constituency

Coordinates: 52°44′11″N 7°1′10″W

- Former borough constituency for the Irish House of Commons
- County: County Carlow
- Borough: Old Leighlin

–1801
- Seats: 2
- Replaced by: Disfranchised

Old Leighlin was a constituency represented in the Irish House of Commons, the lower house in the Irish Parliament of the Kingdom of Ireland. It was based in Old Leighlin, near the town of Leighlinbridge in County Carlow. It was a bishop's borough, controlled by the Church of Ireland Bishop of Ferns and Leighlin.

The borough was disfranchised by the Acts of Union 1800, with effect from 1 January 1801. £15,000 was paid to the Commissioners of First Fruits to be used at their discretion.

== Members of Parliament ==
Election	First MP	Second MP
1634	James Cusack	Richard FitzGerald (Note: Sat for Strabane.)
1634	James Cusack	Sir Thomas Meredyth
1639	James Cusack (Note: Sat for Ballyshannon.)	Roger Brereton
1639	Thomas Davills (Note: Expelled for rebellion.)	Roger Brereton
1642	Walter Chambré (died)	Roger Brereton
1646	Peter Wybrants	Roger Brereton
1661	Sir Francis Butler	Charles Meredyth
1689	Darby Long	Daniel Doran
1692	John Dunbar	Edward Jones
1695	Richard Boyle	John Beauchamp
1703	James Agar	John Tench
1713	John Beauchamp	St Leger Gilbert
1727	John Beauchamp	Thomas Trotter
1745	Hon. Robert Jocelyn	Thomas Carter
1757	Richard Rigby	Thomas Carter
May 1761	John Bourke	Francis Andrews (Note: Sat for Londonderry City.)
1761	John Bourke	Edward Nicholson
1768	Sir FitzGerald Aylmer, 6th Bt	Thomas Monck
1773	Sir FitzGerald Aylmer, 6th Bt	John Blaquiere (Note: Sir John Blaquiere from 1774.)
1776	Hugh Massy	John Blaquiere
1777	Robert Jephson	John Blaquiere
1783	Hon. Henry Luttrell (Note: Viscount Luttrell from 1785.)	Hon. Arthur Acheson
1787	Sir Edward Leslie, 1st Bt	Hon. Arthur Acheson
1790	Edward Cooke	Hon. Arthur Acheson
1791	Edward Cooke	Patrick Duigenan
1798	Edward Cooke	Sir Boyle Roche, 1st Bt
1801	Constituency disenfranchised	
