= George Atcheson Jr. =

United States diplomat

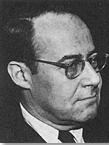
George Atcheson Jr

George C. Atcheson Jr. (1896 – 17 August 1947) was a United States diplomat, China Hand, chargé d'affaires in China, and advisor for Supreme Commander for the Allied Powers. During World War II, he tried to mediate in the conflicts between Kuomintang and Chinese Communist Party for US government but failed.

Atcheson, while serving as General Douglas MacArthur's political adviser and allied council chairman, died after the military flight he was on crashed en route to Washington, DC. He was heading there to discuss plans for a Japanese peace treaty.
