= Sir Edward Leslie, 1st Baronet =

Anglo-Irish politician (1744–1818)

Escutcheon of the Leslie baronets of Tarbert

Sir Edward Leslie, 1st Baronet (1744 – 21 November 1818) was an Anglo-Irish politician.

Leslie was the son of Bishop James Leslie and Joyce Lyster.

He was the Member of Parliament for Old Leighlin in the Irish House of Commons between 1787 and 1790. On 3 September 1787 he was a baronet, of Tarbert in the Baronetage of Ireland. On 27 July 1798 he raised the Loyal Tarbert Regiment of fencibles, of which he became colonel. The regiment was disbanded at Plymouth on 19 June 1802.

In 1773 he married Anne Cane. Leslie had no male issue and on his death his title became extinct. His daughter, Louisa, married Lord Douglas Gordon-Hallyburton.

Parliament of Ireland
Preceded by Hon. Henry Luttrell; Hon. Arthur Acheson	Member of Parliament for Old Leighlin; 1787–1790; With: Hon. Arthur Acheson	Succeeded by Edward Cooke; Hon. Arthur Acheson
Baronetage of Ireland
New creation	Baronet (of Tarbert); 1787–1818	Extinct
