= Tim Atchison =

American football player (born 1987)

No. 36
- Position: Safety

Personal information
- Born: September 27, 1987 (age 39); Houston, Texas, U.S.
- Listed height: 6 ft 1 in (1.85 m)
- Listed weight: 200 lb (91 kg)

Career information
- High school: Copperas Cave (Copperas Cove, Texas)
- College: Baylor
- NFL draft: 2011: undrafted

Career history
- St. Louis Rams (2011)
- Stats at Pro Football Reference

Timothy Drew Atchison (born September 27, 1987) is an American former professional football player who was a safety for the St. Louis Rams of the National Football League (NFL). He played college football for the Baylor Bears. He also played briefly in the Rams in 2011, but was released early in the season after a hamstring injury.

== Early life ==
Atchison was born in 1987 in Houston. He attended Copperas Cove High School in Copperas Cove, Texas. He returned three interceptions for touchdowns, returned a blocked kick for another touchdown, and helped the 2005 Copperas Cove team to a 13-1 record.

== College career ==
In February 2006, after being heavily recruited by multiple schools, Atchison signed a letter of intent to play college football at Baylor University. He played for the Baylor Bears football team from 2006 to 2010. He was true freshman in 2006 and a redshirt freshman in 2007. As a sophomore in 2008, he played in 11 of 12 games, starting in three, and totaled 31 tackles (21 solo) and three pass breakups.

As a junior in 2009, he was moved from safety to cornerback. He started all 12 games at left cornerback. He sustained a broken hand in the fourth game and wore a club-like cast to protect the arm for the remaining games. He continued to start every game and totaled 42 tackles (29 solo), two tackles for loss, one interception and five passes broken up on the season.

As a senior in 2010, he returned to the safety position where he had played prior to the 2009 season. At the time, he noted: "I have been playing safety most of my life. I like the fact that free safety is kind of the leader of the defense. It is my job to make sure everybody is lined up right and to get us in the right defense." Baylor coach Art Briles described free safety as a more natural position for Atchison. Atchison started all 13 games at free safety in 2020, totaling 72 tackles (58 solo) and a team-high nine pass breakups. On October 1, 2010, he returned an interception for a touchdown, helping Baylor to its biggest conference win ever, a 55-7 blowout over Kansas. After the 2010 season, he played in the 2011 Eastham Energy All-Star Game.

== Professional career ==
Atchison was signed by the Rams as an undrafted free agent in September 2011. On September 19, 2011, in the fourth quarter of his first NFL game, a nationally-televised loss to the New York Giants, Atchison suffered a grade 2 strain to his hamstring. He was released on September 26, 2011.
