= William Adcock (politician) =

American politician

William Adcock (July 3, 1850 – July 3, 1926) was an American politician and farmer.

Adcock was born in Warren County, Illinois. In 1871, he graduated from Abingdon College which later merged with Eureka College. Adcock lived in Galesburg, Illinois and was a farmer. He was involved with the Democratic Party and was a delegate to the Democratic National Convention of 1916. Adcock served on the Knox County, Illinois Board of Supervisors. He served in the Illinois House of Representatives from 1925 until his death in 1926. He died in a hospital in Galesburg, Illinois from heart problems.
