= Jack Aitchison (Australian footballer) =

Australian rules footballer

Personal information
- Full name: John Charles Aitchison
- Born: 6 April 1911; Timor, Victoria, Australia
- Died: 3 September 1976 (aged 65); Hawthorn, Victoria, Australia
- Height: 173 cm (5 ft 8 in)
- Weight: 68 kg (150 lb)

Playing career^{1}
Years	Club	Games (Goals)
1935	Hawthorn	1 (0)
- ^{1} Playing statistics correct to the end of 1935.

John Charles Aitchison (6 April 1911 – 3 September 1976) was an Australian rules footballer who played with Hawthorn in the Victorian Football League (VFL).
