= D. Craig Aitchison =

Canadian military officer

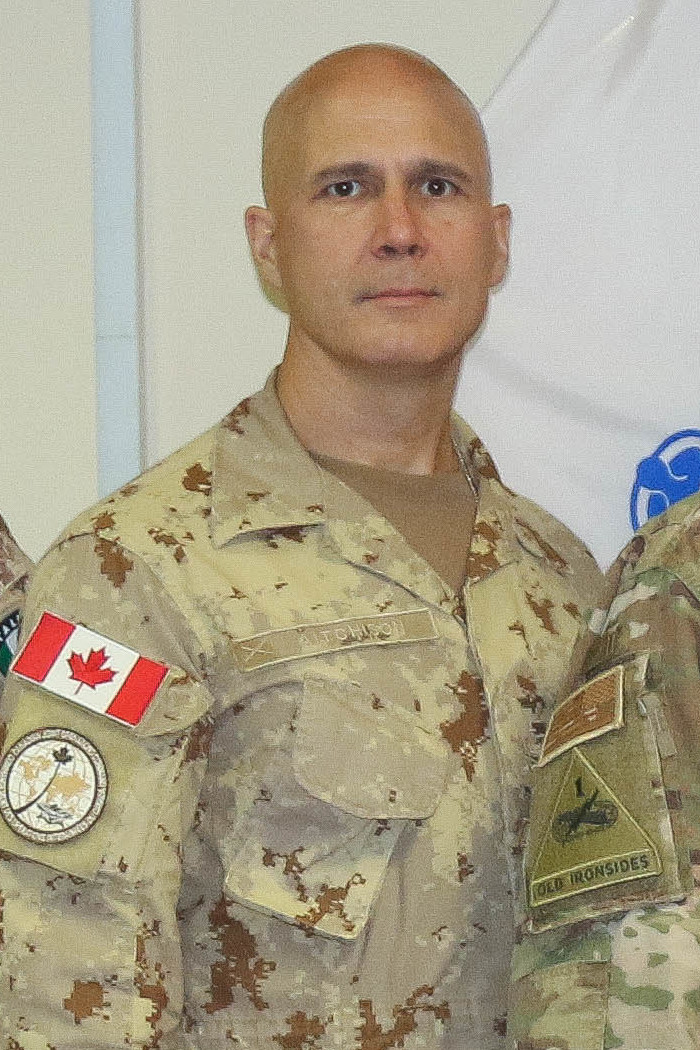
- Aitchison in 2017
- Born: June 4, 1968 (age 58)
- Education: University of New Brunswick; Canadian Forces College; United States Army School of Advanced Military Studies
- Children: 2
- Military career
- Allegiance: Canada
- Branch: Canadian Army
- Service years: 1985 - 2023
- Rank: Major General
- Units: Royal Canadian Regiment 1987-2023; Royal New Brunswick Regiment 1985-1987
- Conflicts: War in Afghanistan; Iraq Intervention
- Awards: Commander of the Order of Military Merit; Canadian Forces' Decoration

Major-General David Craig Aitchison CMM CD (born June 4, 1968) is a former Canadian military officer, who most recently served as the commander of the Canadian Defence Academy. He is the former Director of Army Staff and Director of Infantry for the Canadian Forces, the former Commandant of the Infantry School, the former Commander of the Combat Training Centre, and former Deputy Commanding General for Operations with US Army Alaska. MGen Aitchison holds a Bachelor of Business Administration from the University of New Brunswick. a master's degree in Defence Studies from the Joint Command and Staff Program at the Canadian Forces College, as well as a master's degree in Military Art and Science from the United States Army School of Advanced Military Studies. Aitchison was promoted to Brigadier General, while serving as Chief of Staff for the Combined Joint Forces Land Component Command - Operation INHERENT RESOLVE (CJFLCC-OIR). He was promoted major-general in June 2020 and took command of the Canadian Defense Academy in August 2020.

== Life ==
D. Craig Aitchison was born on June 4, 1968, to William Joseph Aitchison and Elva Aitchison. Aitchison is the second of three sons to Joe and Elva. His father, W.J. Aitchison, is a retired Colonel, and the former Colonel of The Regiment for The Royal Canadian Regiment. His brother Alan is a retired Master Warrant Officer.

Aitchison joined the Canadian Forces Reserves in January 1985 with the Royal New Brunswick Regiment. He transferred into the Regular Force in 1987 through the Regular Officer Training Plan, while attending University of New Brunswick. He retired from the Canadian Armed Forces in 2023.

Aitchison has two adult children and a grand daughter. He is married to Sally, and they currently reside in Kingston, Ontario.

== Military career ==
=== Training and Early Postings ===
Aitchison joined the Canadian Forces (Reserve) in January 1985 and transferred to the Regular Force (ROTP) in 1987. He attended the University of New Brunswick in Fredericton and graduated in 1990 with a Bachelor of Business Administration. On completion of Infantry Phase IV training, he was posted to 2nd Battalion, The Royal Canadian Regiment (2 RCR). He served as a Rifle Platoon Commander, Battalion Intelligence Officer and Assistant Adjutant. He deployed to the Former Republic of Yugoslavia (FRY) as Intelligence Officer on Operation CAVALIER Roto 0.

Aitchison was posted to the Canadian Forces Officer Candidate School in Chilliwack, BC, in 1994 and served two years as a Platoon Commander and Company Second-in-Command. He moved with the School, which had been re-designated the CF Leadership and Recruit School, where he served as a Company Commander.

Posted to 3rd Battalion, The Royal Canadian Regiment in 1997, he filled a variety of posts before leaving as the Adjutant in 2001. While serving with 3 RCR he deployed twice on operations to the FRY in 1998 – 99 (Operation PALLADIUM Roto 3) and 2001 (Operation PALLADIUM Roto 8). He attended the Canadian Land Forces Command and Staff College in 2001, following which he was posted to the Tactics School at CFB Gagetown as the School Operations Officer.

=== Tactics School, Afghanistan Deployment, Further Education, and Command Positions ===
Promoted Major in 2002 while at the Tactics School, he was posted to 2 RCR as the Officer Commanding Golf Company and subsequently as the Operations Officer. He left 2 RCR in 2005 to assume a position as a desk officer in the Directorate of Land Force Development. After two years on the Land Staff, Aitchison was selected for and attended the Joint Command and Staff Program at the Canadian Forces College where he earned a master's degree in Defence Studies.

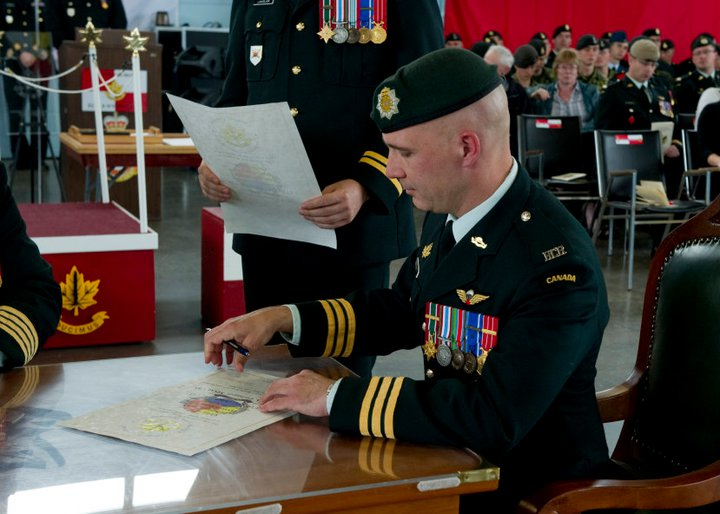
Craig Aitchison in 2011.

Following Staff College, Aitchison was promoted to Lieutenant-Colonel and deployed to Afghanistan (Operation ATHENA Roto 6) for nine months as the CJ3 (Current Operations) at HQ Regional Command (South) in Kandahar. On repatriation, he took command of the Infantry School.

On completing command of the School in 2011, Aitchison was posted to Fort Leavenworth, Kansas to attend the year-long Advance Operational Art Studies Fellowship at the United States Army School of Advanced Military Studies (SAMS) where he earned a master's degree in Military Art and Science. He spent the following year on the faculty of SAMS as a seminar leader helping teach majors operational planning.

Promoted Colonel in May 2013, he was posted to the Army Staff in Ottawa as Director of Army Staff and Director of Infantry.

In July 2015, Aitchison was posted to Gagetown New Brunswick as the Commander, Combat Training Centre.

=== Promotion to General ===
On January 31, 2017, it was announced that BGen Aitchison would be promoted acting while so employed to the rank of Brigadier-General and will be appointed Chief of Staff for the Coalition Forces Land Component Command (CFLCC-I).

Aitchison was promoted to Brigadier-General on April 3, 2017. In August 2017, Aitchison deployed to Iraq to assume the role of Chief of Staff for the Combined/Joint Forces Land Component Command, Operation INHERENT RESOLVE.

In August 2020, following his promotion to Major-General, Aitchison assumed command of the Canadian Defence Academy. He is the former chair of the senate of the Royal Canadian Regiment. Aitchison retired from the Canadian Armed Forces in 2023.

Aitchison was appointed a Commander of the Order of Military Merit on September 23, 2022.
