= John Aitchison (cricketer) =

English cricketer

Personal information
- Full name: John Edward Aitchison
- Born: 27 December 1928; Gillingham, Kent
- Died: 2 April 2009 (aged 80); Sydenham, London
- Batting: Right-handed
- Bowling: Slow left arm orthodox
- Role: Bowler

Domestic team information
- Years: Team
- 1949–1950: Kent
- FC debut: 28 May 1949 Kent v Glamorgan
- Last FC: 5 July 1950 Kent v Leicestershire

Career statistics
Competition	First-class
Matches	3
Runs scored	6
Batting average	2.00
100s/50s	0/0
Top score	4
Balls bowled	147
Wickets	3
Bowling average	29.33
5 wickets in innings	0
10 wickets in match	0
Best bowling	3/33
Catches/stumpings	0/–
- Source: CricInfo, 21 October 2009

John Edward Aitchison (27 December 1928 – 2 April 2009) was an English sportsman who played cricket for Kent County Cricket Club. A left-arm spin bowler, he played in three first-class cricket matches, one in 1949 and two in 1950, and was signed as an association footballer by Queens Park Rangers and by Chelsea FC.

Aitchison was born at Gillingham in Kent in 1928, the son of Gilbert and Margaret Aitchison. His father was a hairdresser and John played cricket for Bexleyheath Cricket Club. After taking 128 wickets during the 1945 season, he was taken on to the ground staff at Kent in 1946, living with an aunt in Whitstable in order to be closer to the county's Canterbury headquarters.

On his debut for the Kent Second XI, Aitchison took nine wickets against Sussex Second XI, but he played little cricket in either 1947 or 1948 whilst undertaking his National Service, spending much of the period posted in Germany. He made his first-class cricket debut just three days after his first Second XI appearance of 1949, playing against Glamorgan at Gravesend with Kent's primary spin bowler Doug Wright unable to play. He took all three of his first-class wickets on debut, taking 3/33 to dismiss the Glamorgan tail in their first innings. On what The Times called a "badly crumbling pitch", he did not bowl in the second innings as Fred Ridgway and Eddie Crush took all ten wickets to dismiss Glamorgan for 114 runs.

Described by Derek Ufton, a contemporary on the Kent ground staff, as "a left-arm bowler with a beautiful action", Aitchison appears to have been less effective following his National Service. He took 24 Second XI wickets in 1949 and was awarded his Second XI county cap in 1950, but played in only two other matches for Kent's First XI, both in July 1950. He failed to take a wicket against either Worcestershire and Leicestershire, conceding 17 runs from one over in the latter match, and was released from the ground staff at the end of the season.

Away from cricket, Aitchison played football for Ramsgate Athletic. He was described in The History of Kent Cricket as a "professional footballer" and was signed by Queens Park Rangers, but never played for the team in a senior match. He worked for Harvey's Sports and played club cricket for the company as well as for Bexleyheath.

Aitchison later moved to work in the metal fabrication industry as a manager. He died at Sydenham in South London in 2009 aged 80.
