= Sir Arthur Acheson, 5th Baronet =

Irish politician and baronet (1688-1748)

Sir Arthur Acheson, 5th Baronet (26 January 1688 – 8 February 1748) was an Irish politician and baronet.

The son of Sir Nicholas Acheson, 4th Baronet, he succeeded to the baronetcy upon the death of his father. In 1728, he was appointed High Sheriff of Armagh. Acheson sat in the Irish House of Commons for Mullingar from 1727 until his death in 1748.

Acheson had a personal library of some significance, which he marked with his characteristic early armorial bookplate.

He married Anne Savage in 1715, with whom he had the following children:

- Nicholas Acheson (b. bef. 1716–1717)
- Philip Acheson (b. bef. 1718–1727)
- Archibald Acheson, 1st Viscount Gosford (1718–1790)
- Nicola Acheson (1725-1761) married Robert Trench
- Ann Acheson (d. 1785) married Walter Cope
- Arthur (d. 1758)

Parliament of Ireland
Preceded by Thomas Bellew; Eustace Budgell	Member of Parliament for Mullingar; 1727–1748; With: John Rochfort	Succeeded by Viscount Forbes; John Rochfort
Baronetage of Nova Scotia
Preceded by Nicholas Acheson	Baronet (of Glencairny); 1701–1748	Succeeded by Archibald Acheson
