= Atkinson (surname) =

- Gender: Unisex
- Language: English

Origin
- Language: Middle English
- Origin: Atkin
- Meaning: son of Atkin

Other names
- See also: Acheson, Aitchison, Aicheson, and Aitcheson, Adcock, Atcock

Atkinson is an English-language surname. The name is derived from a patronymic form of the Middle English Atkin. The personal name Atkin is one of many pet forms of the name Adam.

The name corresponds to the Scottish name Aitchison. The name Atkinson is particularly common in Northern England. At the time of the British Census of 1881, its relative frequency was highest in Westmorland (19.8 times the British average), followed by Cumberland, County Durham, Northumberland, Yorkshire, Lincolnshire, Lancashire, Cheshire and Rutland. In Ireland, the name is common only in Ulster and particularly in counties Antrim and Down. Some Atkinsons are descended from Planters, although the name was recorded in Ireland before that period.

Acheson is a variation of the name in Scotland and the Border region, having been originally spelt Atzinson (with the "z" being pronounced as "y", as in yet).

== People with the surname ==
=== A ===
- Adeline Detroit Wood Atkinson (1841–1916), American hotelier
- Aimie Atkinson (born 1987), British stage actress and singer
- Al Atkinson (born 1943), American football player
- Alan Atkinson (footballer) (born 1951), Australian Rules footballer
- Alan Atkinson (historian) (born 1946), Australian historian
- Alfred Atkinson (1874–1900), British soldier
- Alia Atkinson (born 1988), Jamaican swimmer
- Anthony Barnes Atkinson (1944–2017), British economist
- Arthur Atkinson (disambiguation), multiple people
- Ashlie Atkinson (born 1977), American actress

=== B ===
- Barbara Atkinson (1926–2015), English actress
- Basil Atkinson, (1895–1971) Under-librarian of Cambridge University, writer on theology
- Beau Atkinson (born 2004), American football player
- Bert Atkinson, fictional character from EastEnders
- Bill Atkinson (1951–2025), American creator of Apple Computer's QuickDraw, MacPaint and HyperCard
- Bill Atkinson (baseball) (born 1954), Major League Baseball pitcher
- Bill Atkinson (designer) (1916–1995), American fashion designer
- Bill Atkinson (footballer, born 1944) (1944–2013), English footballer
- Brian Atkinson (1987-Present) Sgt, United States Marine Corps
- Bridget Atkinson (1732–1814), English shell collector.
- Brodie Atkinson (born 1972), Australian rules footballer
- Brooks Atkinson (1894–1984), New York Times theatre critic
- Bruce Atkinson (born 1953), Australian politician

=== C ===
- Cam Atkinson (born 1989), American ice hockey player
- Carl Atkinson (died 1985), Australian diver and salvage expert
- Chloe Atkinson, fictional character from the British soap opera Emmerdale
- Chris Atkinson (born 1979), Australian rally driver
- C. T. Atkinson, (1874–1964), Oxford military historian
- Christopher Atkinson (missionary) (fl 1652–5), early Quaker missionary from Westmorland and one of the Valiant Sixty
- Christopher Atkinson Saville (c. 1738–1819), alter known as Christopher Atkinson until about 1798, English merchant and politician
- Colin Atkinson (1931–1991), British cricketer and teacher

=== D ===
- Dalian Atkinson (1968–2016), British footballer
- Damon Atkinson, American drummer
- Dan Atkinson (born 1961), British journalist and author
- Daniel Atkinson (born 2001), Australian rugby league footballer
- Daniel Atkinson (biochemist) (1921–2024), American biochemist at UCLA
- Denis Atkinson (1926–2001, Barbadian cricketer
- Donald R. Atkinson (born 1940), American psychologist
- Dorothy Atkinson (born 1966), English actress and singer
- Dorothy Atkinson (historian) (1929–2016), American historian

=== E ===
- Edith Atkinson (1890–1983), American juvenile court judge
- Edward Dawson Atkinson (1891–1934), British military officer
- Edward L. Atkinson (1881–1929), British physician and explorer
- Eleanor Stackhouse Atkinson (1863–1942), American writer
- Eric Atkinson (1927–1998), Barbadian cricketer, brother of Denis
- Eugene Atkinson (1927–2016), American politician

=== F ===
- Frank Atkinson (actor) (1893–1963), British actor
- Fred Atkinson (educator), American Director of Education in the Philippines (1900–1902)
- Frederick Atkinson (1919–2018), British civil servant
- Frederick Valentine Atkinson (1916–2002), British mathematician

=== G ===
- Gemma Atkinson (born 1984), British actress and model
- George Atkinson (disambiguation), multiple people
- Graham Atkinson (1943–2017), British footballer
- Gus Atkinson (born 1998), English cricketer

=== H ===
- Harry Atkinson (1943–2017), New Zealand premier
- Harry E. Atkinson (1920–2001), American politician
- Henry Atkinson (disambiguation), multiple people
- Hugh Atkinson (footballer) (born 1960), Irish footballer (Wolves, Exeter)

=== I ===
- Isabel Atkinson (1891–1968), British-Canadian philanthropist and women's rights activist

=== J ===
- James Atkinson (disambiguation), multiple people
- Janelle Atkinson (born 1982), Jamaican freestyle swimmer
- Janette Atkinson, British psychologist and academic
- Janice Atkinson (born 1962), British MEP for the South East England region
- Jerry Atkinson (1921–2006), American politician
- Joanne Atkinson (born 1959), English swimmer and Olympic athlete
- John Atkinson (disambiguation), multiple people
- Jon Atkinson (1968–2025), English cricketer
- Joseph E. Atkinson (1865–1948), Canadian newspaper editor
- Josh Atkinson (1902–1983), English footballer
- Juliette Atkinson (1873–1944), American tennis player
- June Atkinson (born 1948), American politician

=== K ===
- Kate Atkinson (actress) (born 1972), Australian actress
- Kate Atkinson (writer) (born 1951), British writer
- Ken Atkinson (born 1947), Canadian politician

=== L ===
- La'Tangela Atkinson (born 1984), American basketball player
- Lawrence Atkinson (1873–1931), English artist, musician and poet
- Lefty Atkinson (1904–1961), American baseball player
- Leigh Atkinson (born 1958), English swimmer
- Leonard Atkinson (1910– 17 May 1990), British engineer and senior British Army officer
- Leonard A. Atkinson (1906–1998), New Zealand civil servant
- Lily Atkinson (1866–1921), New Zealand temperance campaigner, suffragist and feminist
- Lisle Atkinson (1940–2019), American musician
- Llewellyn Atkinson (1867–1945), Australian politician
- Louis E. Atkinson (1841–1910), American physician, attorney and politician
- Louisa Atkinson (1834–1872), Australian writer, botanist and illustrator
- Lucas Atkinson (born 1981), American politician
- Lucy Atkinson (1817–1893), English explorer and author

=== M ===
- Mark Atkinson (disambiguation), multiple people
- Martin Atkinson (born 1971), English football referee
- Mary Atkinson (suffragette), British suffragette and trade unionist
- Maudie Atkinson, fictional character from Harper Lee's novel To Kill A Mockingbird
- Michael Atkinson (Inspector General) (born 1964), American Inspector General of the Intelligence Community
- Michael Atkinson (politician) (born 1958), Australian politician
- Mike Atkinson (born 1994), footballer
- Molly Atkinson (1909–2008), New Zealand contralto and music teacher

=== N ===
- Nathaniel Atkinson (born 1999), Australian footballer for Heart of Midlothian
- Neville Atkinson (1933–2007), Royal Navy pilot
- Norman Atkinson (1923–2013), British politician

=== P ===
- Paul Atkinson (disambiguation), multiple people
- Peter Atkinson (disambiguation), multiple people

=== R ===
- Rebecca Atkinson (disambiguation), multiple people
- Richard Atkinson (disambiguation), multiple people
- Rick Atkinson (born 1952), American writer and editor
- Robert Atkinson (disambiguation), multiple people
- Ron Atkinson ("Big Ron") (born 1939), British football manager
- Ronald Field Atkinson (1928–2005), British philosopher
- Rowan Atkinson (born 1955), British comedian, known for his role as Mr. Bean
- Rupert Atkinson (disambiguation), multiple people
- Ruth Atkinson (1918–1997), American comics artist

=== S ===
- Sallyanne Atkinson (born 1942), Australian politician
- Samuel C. Atkinson (1864–1942), associate justice of the Supreme Court of Georgia
- Shane Atkinson (disambiguation), multiple people
- Sophie Atkinson (1876–1972), English-Canadian landscape painter
- Stan Atkinson (1932–2025), American news anchor
- Steve Atkinson (1948–2003), Canadian ice hockey player
- Steve Atkinson (cricketer) (born 1952), English cricketer

=== T ===
- Ted Atkinson (1916–2005), Canadian jockey
- Terry Atkinson (born 1939), British artist
- Thomas Dinham Atkinson (1864–1948), English architect and antiquarian with an interest in ecclesiastical architecture
- Thomas Lewis Atkinson (1817–1898), English engraver
- Thomas Witlam Atkinson (1799–1861), English architect, artist and traveller
- Ti-Grace Atkinson (born 1938), American feminist writer
- Tiffany Atkinson (born 1972), British poet
- Todd Atkinson, Canadian Anglican bishop
- Tom Atkinson (1930–1990), English cricketer

=== V ===
- Val Atkinson (1894–1982), Australian theatrical producer
- Vanessa Atkinson (born 1976), Dutch squash player

=== W ===
- Whittier C. Atkinson (1893–1991), American physician
- William Henry Atkinson (1923–2015), Canadian naval aviator
- William J. Atkinson (born c. 1950), American scientist
- William Stephen Atkinson (1820–1876), Indian lepidopterist
- William Walker Atkinson (Yogi Ramacharaka) (1862–1932), American writer
- William Yates Atkinson, 55th Governor of Georgia from 1894 to 1898

== Species named after a person named Atkinson ==
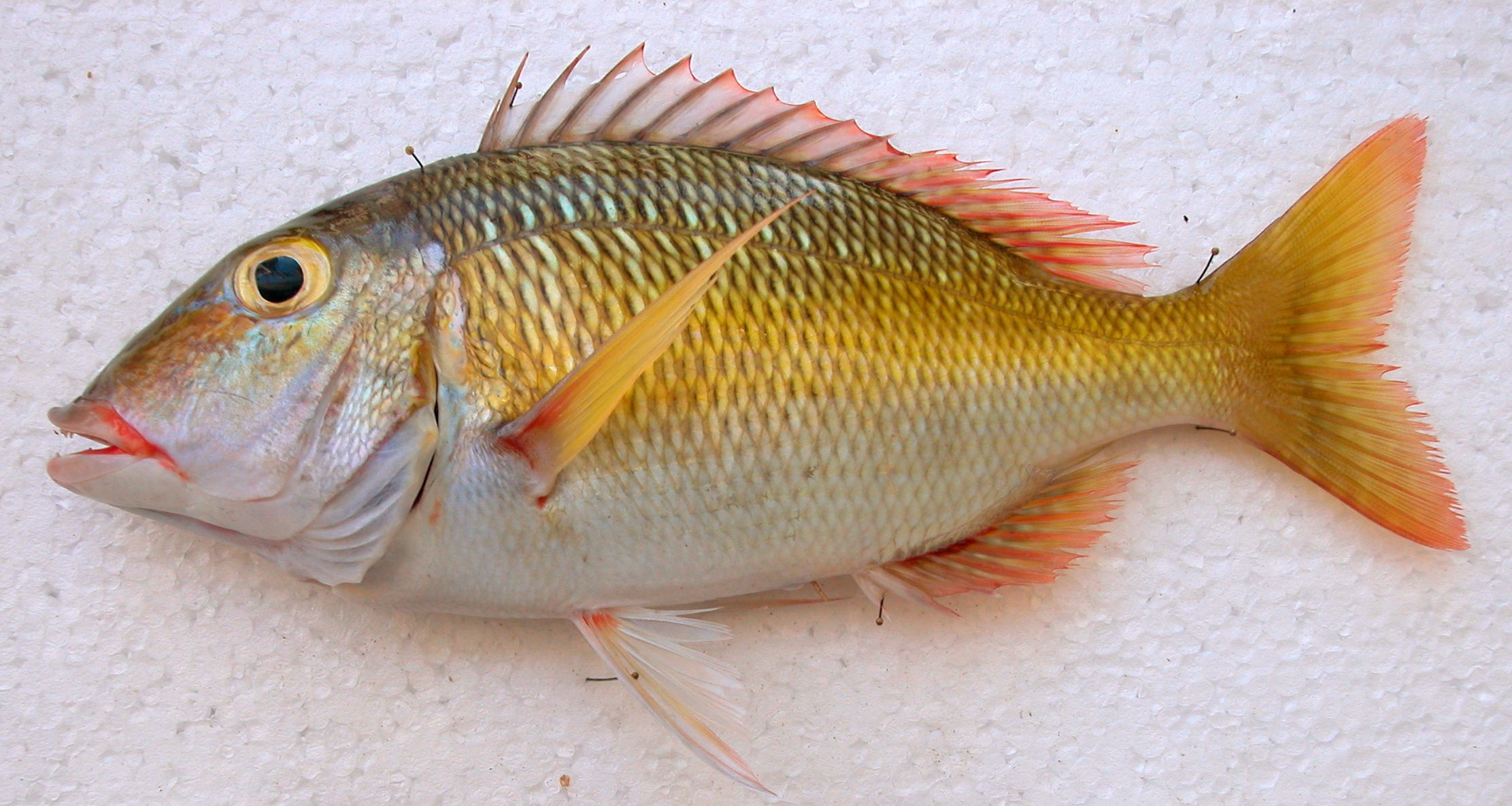
Lethrinus atkinsoni

- Lethrinus atkinsoni, a fish of the family Lethrinidae from the Pacific Ocean, described by Alvin Seale in 1910

== See also ==
- Acheson (surname)
- Atkinson (disambiguation)
