= William Atkinson =

William Atkinson may refer to:

== Politicians ==
- William Atkinson (British Columbia politician) (1868–1939), politician in British Columbia, Canada
- William Yates Atkinson (1854–1899), governor of Georgia, US
- William P. Atkinson (1901–1980), Wisconsin state assemblyman
- William Albert Atkinson (1876–1948), provincial politician from Alberta
- Gordon Atkinson (Australian politician) (William Gordon Atkinson, 1941–1984), Australian farmer and politician
- William D. Atkinson (1861–1945), associate justice of the Kansas Supreme Court

== Sportsmen ==
- Bill Atkinson (baseball) (born 1954), American baseball player
- Bill Atkinson (footballer, born 1944) (1944–2013), English footballer
- Bill Atkinson (Australian footballer) (1876–1966), Australian footballer
- Will Atkinson (born 1988), English footballer

== Writers ==
- William Atkinson (translator) (died 1509), English translator
- William Atkinson (poet) (1757–1846), English poet

== Others ==
- William Atkinson (architect) (1774/5–1839), English architect
- William Atkinson (1811–1886), English architect, son of Peter Atkinson
- William Stephen Atkinson (1820–1876), Indian lepidopterist
- William Edwin Atkinson (1862–1926), Canadian Impressionist painter
- William Walker Atkinson (1862–1932), occultist, American pioneer of the New Thought
- Bill Atkinson (designer) (1916–1995), American architect, fashion designer and photographer
- William Atkinson (teacher) (born 1950), head teacher at Phoenix High School, London
- Bill Atkinson (1951–2025), American computer engineer, computer programmer and photographer
- Will Atkinson (musician) (1908–2003), traditional musician from northern Northumberland
- William Henry Atkinson (1923–2015), Canadian naval fighter ace
- William Atkinson (translator) (died 1509), canon of Windsor
- William J. Atkinson (born c. 1950), American scientist
- William King Atkinson (1765–1820), American lawyer and judge
- William Edward Atkinson (1946–2006), American Augustinian priest and educator
