= Thomas Atkinson =

Thomas Atkinson may refer to:

- Thomas Atkinson (architect) (1729–1798), British architect
- Thomas Witlam Atkinson (1799–1861), British architect
- Thomas Atkinson (bishop) (1807–1881), third Episcopal Bishop of the Diocese of North Carolina
- Thomas Atkinson (priest) (died 1616), English Roman Catholic priest and martyr
- Thomas Atkinson (Royal Navy officer) (1767–1836), Master of HMS Victory at the Battle of Trafalgar
- Thomas Atkinson (divine) (1600–1639), English divine and dramatist
- Thomas Atkinson (Wisconsin politician) (1928–1988), mayor of Green Bay, Wisconsin
- Thomas Atkinson (poet) (1801–1833), Scottish poet and miscellaneous writer
- Thomas E. Atkinson (1824–1868), American sailor and Medal of Honor recipient
- Thomas Lewis Atkinson (1817–1898), English engraver
- Thomas Robert Atkinson (1854–1921), lawyer and politician in Ontario, Canada
- Thomas Atkinson (actor) (born 1998)
- Thomas Atkinson (Australian politician) (1822–1906), politician in South Australia
- Thomas Dinham Atkinson (1864–1948), English architect

== See also ==
- Tom Atkinson, English cricketer
