= James Atkinson =

James Atkinson may refer to:

== Sport ==
- James Atkinson (bobsleigh) (1929–2010), American bobsleigh competitor at the Winter Olympics
- James Atkinson (footballer) (born 1995), English goalkeeper for Gretna 2008
- Jamie Atkinson (born 1990), international cricketer for Hong Kong
- Jim Atkinson (1896–1956), Australian sportsman from Tasmania
- Jimmy Atkinson (1886–after 1910), English footballer for Bolton Wanderers and others

== Other fields ==
- James Atkinson (Australian politician) (c. 1820–1873), New South Wales politician
- James Atkinson (inventor) (1846–1914), inventor of the Single-Stroke combustion engine in 1882
- James Atkinson (JP), first mayor of Crewe, England
- James Atkinson (Persian scholar) (1780–1852), published one of the earliest translations of the Shahnameh in English
- James Atkinson (physicist) (1916–2008), radar pioneer
- James Atkinson (software developer), founder of the phpBB project
- James Atkinson (surgeon) (1759–1839), English surgeon and bibliographic
- James Atkinson (theologian) (1914–2011), Church of England priest and academic
- James Henry Atkinson (1849–1942), British ironmonger who invented the mousetrap

== Fictional ==
- James Atkinson (Neighbours), fictional character from the soap opera Neighbours
