= John Atkinson =

John Atkinson may refer to:

== Arts and entertainment ==
- John Atkinson (actor), Australian actor
- John Augustus Atkinson (c. 1775–1830), English artist engraver and watercolourist
- John Christopher Atkinson (1814–1900), English author, antiquary, and priest
- John Atkinson, editor at Stereophile

== Sports ==
- John Atkinson (athlete) (born 1963), Australian high jumper
- John Atkinson (Australian footballer) (1948–2022), Australian rules footballer
- John Atkinson (cricketer) (1878–1951), English cricketer
- John Atkinson (footballer, born 1884) (1884–1914), Scottish footballer
- John Atkinson (rugby league) (1946–2017), English rugby league footballer

== Other ==
- John Atkinson (Australian politician) (1850–1943), Australian politician
- John Atkinson, Baron Atkinson (1844–1932), Irish lawyer and politician
- John Atkinson (clergyman) (1835–1897), American Methodist clergyman and historian
- John Atkinson (professor) (1938–2022), British classicist
- Torchy Atkinson (John Dunstan Atkinson, 1909–1990), New Zealand horticultural scientist
- John Maxwell Atkinson (1944–2024), British author and academic
- John William Atkinson (1923–2003), American psychologist
- John M. P. Atkinson (1817–1883), president of Hampden–Sydney College

== See also ==
- John Atkinson Grimshaw (1836–1893), British painter usually known as Atkinson Grimshaw
