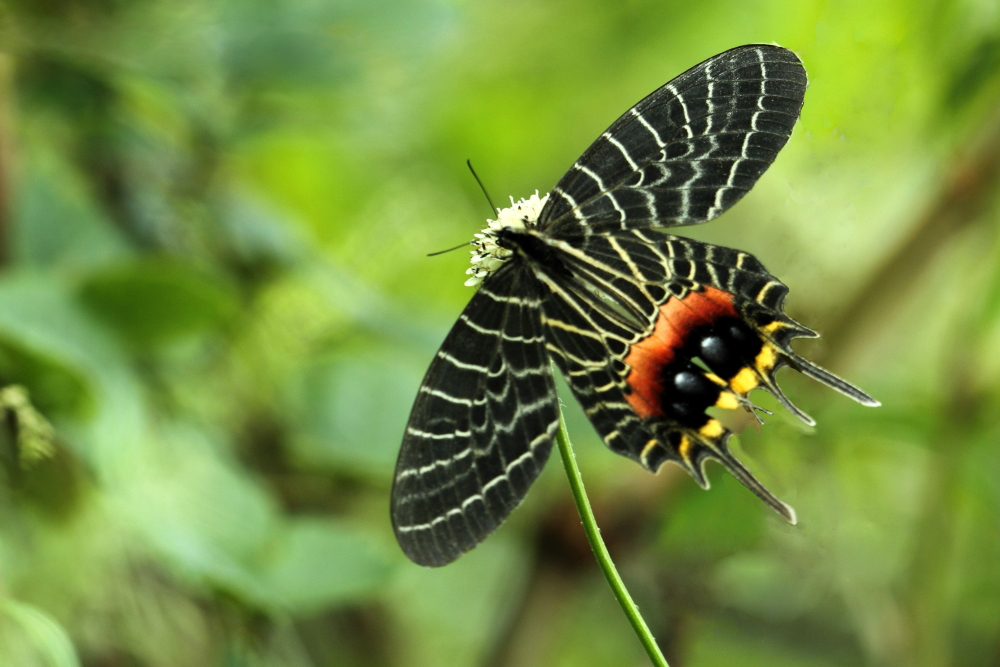

Conservation status
- Least Concern (IUCN 3.1)
- CITES Appendix II

Scientific classification
- Kingdom: Animalia
- Phylum: Arthropoda
- Clade: Pancrustacea
- Class: Insecta
- Order: Lepidoptera
- Family: Papilionidae
- Genus: Bhutanitis
- Species: B. lidderdalii

Binomial name
- Bhutanitis lidderdalii Atkinson, 1873

Synonyms
- Armandia lidderdali

= Bhutanitis lidderdalii =

Bhutan glory

Species of butterfly

Bhutanitis lidderdalii, the Bhutan glory, is a species of swallowtail butterfly (family Papilionidae), which is found in Bhutan, parts of northeastern India and of Southeast Asia. A spectacular insect much sought after by collectors, the species epithet is after Dr R. Lidderdale, from whose collection the butterfly was first described by William Stephen Atkinson in 1873. Listed under CITES Appendix II, the status of the butterfly has been recorded as rare by some authorities but as being of least concern in 2019 by the Red Book of the IUCN.

== Description ==
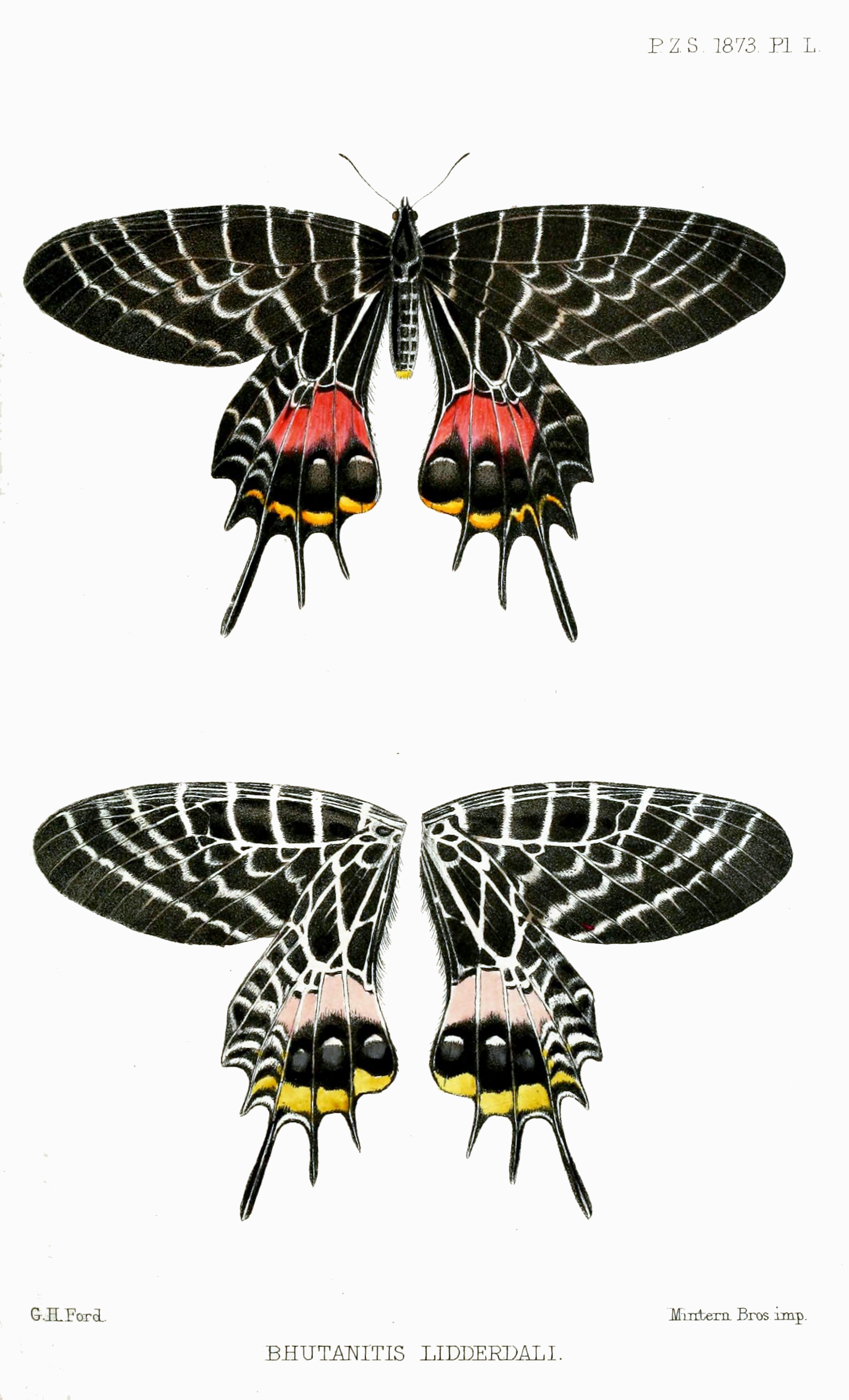
Illustration accompanying the first description of the Bhutan glory by W.S. Atkinson in 1873 - top and bottom views

The sexes of the Bhutan glory are identical in appearance, having long rounded forewings with convex termen and many-tailed hindwings. The butterfly is dull black above with slim, wavy, cream-coloured striations running vertically across the wings. Above, the hindwing has a prominent, large tornal patch with yellow-orange lunules bordering the tails, central bluish-black patches with white ocelli and a crimson post-discal band on the inner edge. Below, the base colour is greyer, the striations are pronounced and the colours subdued or paler.

The detailed description provided by Charles Thomas Bingham (1907) is as follows:

Males and females have the upperside of wings dull black. Forewing with the following ochraceous white slender markings: basal, sub-basal, medial and preapical lines from costa across cell, the first three continued in a series of more or less diffuse curves to the dorsal margin, the preapical terminates on vein 3; beyond apex of cell a somewhat broken transverse line from costa to vein 3 followed by a complete discal transverse line, a short upper postdiscal somewhat ill-defined line that terminates on vein 4 and a subterminal complete line; all the lines except those that cross the cell formed of a series of short curved lines in the interspaces. Hind wing with similar ochraceous white lines more or less in continuation of those on the forewing with the addition of a broad line along vein 1 and the median vein, these two lines do not reach much beyond the base of vein 4; a large lower discal patch, the inward half scarlet, the outer half velvety-black, followed by broad subterminal bright yellow lunules in interspaces 1 to 4; the tails edged very narrowly with ochraceous white; the black on the outer half of the discal patch has in interspaces 1 and 2 very large ill-defined superposed white spots thickly shaded with brownish grey except along their inner margins. Underside similar, all the markings broader, base of cell in hindwing crossed by a short ochraceous-white bar, and the edges of the pre-costal cell with narrow lines of the same colour. Antennae black; head, thorax and abdomen dull black; the thorax greenish grey laterally, the sides of the abdomen with cross-lines of ochreous white.

Wingspan: 90–110 mm.

== Distribution ==
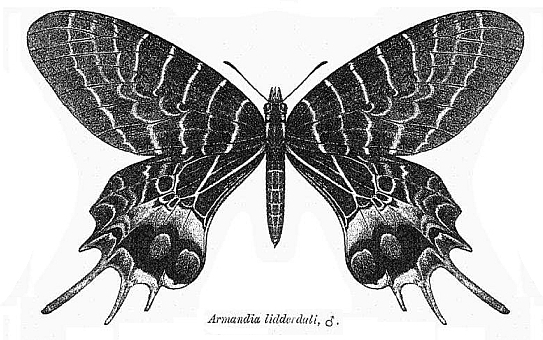
Illustration from Bingham's 1907 Butterflies Vol 2 (The Fauna of British India, Including Ceylon and Burma)

The butterfly was described by William Stephen Atkinson in the Proceedings of the Zoological Society of London in 1873. He writes:

This fine insect was first discovered in May 1868, near Buxa, in the Bhutan Himalayas, at an elevation of 5000 feet, by Dr R. Lidderdale, of the Bengal Army. Dr Lidderdale obtained two specimens from the same locality in 1872; and from one of these, kindly communicated to me, the foregoing description and the accompanying drawing have been prepared.
I am glad to associate Dr Lidderdale's name with this very interesting discovery, which adds a new and remarkable form to the family of Papilionidae.
Other specimens have since been taken by Lt H.M. Rose of the Bengal Staff Corps.

— W.S. Atkinson, M.A., F.L.S., &c.

George Talbot in The Fauna of British India, Including Ceylon and Burma (1939) provides some interesting detail:

[Bhutanitis] lidderdalei was first discovered by Dr. Lidderdale in 1868 in Bhutan, at about 6,000 feet, near Buxa. Between 1886 and 1890 the late H. J. Elwes sent three parties of native collectors from Darjeeling to procure the insect. The first was plundered by the Bhotias, the second was attacked by fever and one of its members died, the third had a man killed by a tiger, and all returned unsuccessful. Specimens were later procured by Mr. A. V. Knyvett, then Inspector of Police, who gave them to Mr. Elwes …

The butterfly is found in Bhutan and northeastern India (Arunacal Pradesh, Assam, Sikkim, Manipur and Nagaland). It is also found in northern Myanmar, Thailand, Vietnam, Laos and the Sichuan and Yunnan provinces of China.

== Taxonomy ==
There are a total of four subspecies of B. lidderdalii. These subspecies (with type localities) are:

- B. lidderdalii lidderdalii Atkinson 1873 - (nominate) Buxa, Bhutan
- B. lidderdalii spinosa Stichel, 1907 - Sichuan, China
- B. lidderdalii ocellatomaculata Igarashi, 1979 - Chiang Mai, northern Thailand
- B. lidderdalii nobucoae Morita, 1997 - north Kachin, Myanmar

== Status ==
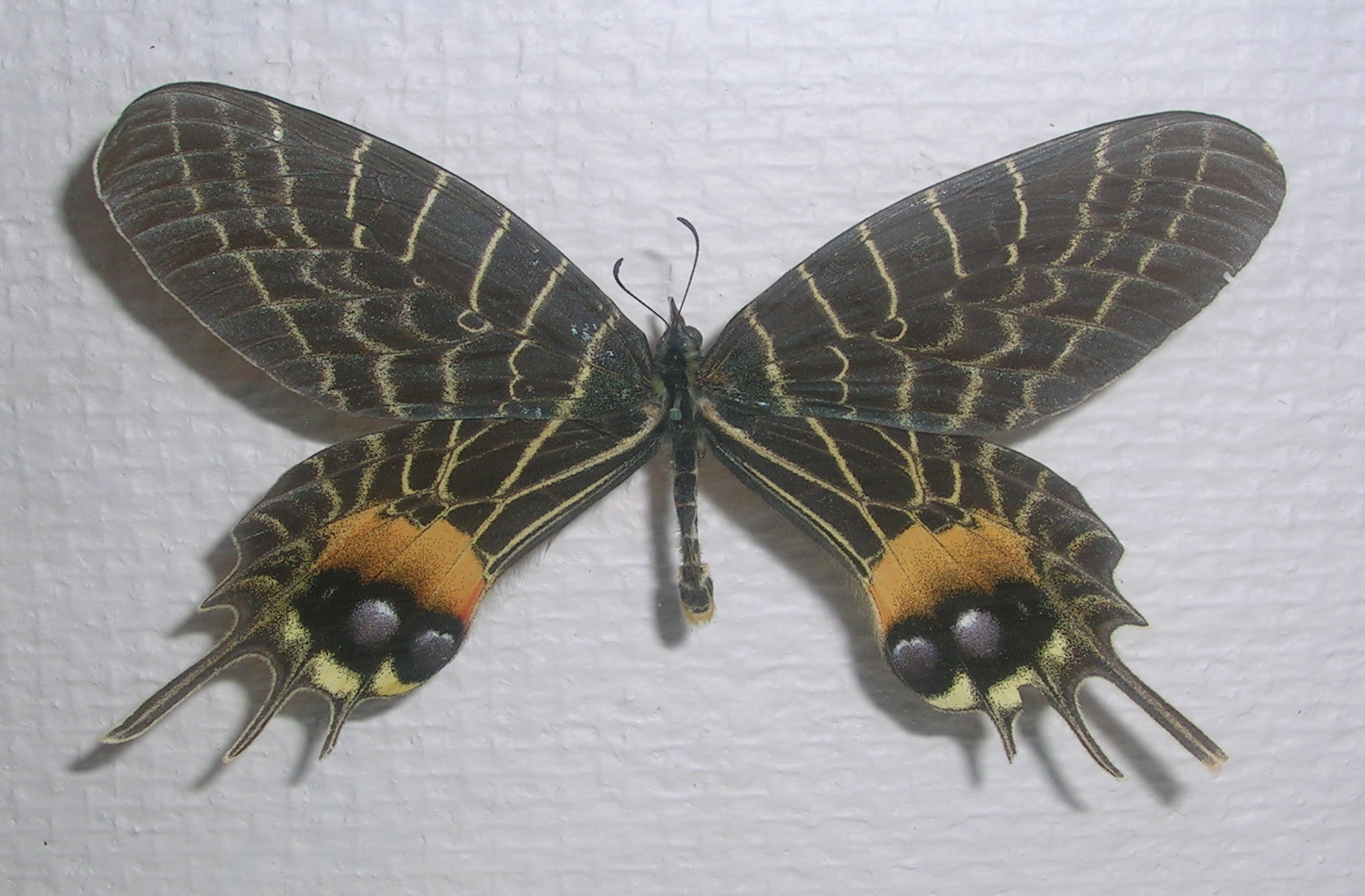
Specimen from the Natural History Museum in Oslo

The Bhutan glory has been considered to be "rare" by Indian authors such as William Harry Evans (1932), Mark Alexander Wynter-Blyth (1957) and Isaac Kehimkar (2009). The nominate subspecies is protected under law in India.

However Collins and Morris (1985) in the IUCN Red Data Book on the threatened swallowtails of the world gives it a status of "insufficiently known" arguing that the Bhutan glory is widely distributed and hence unlikely to be in danger at the moment though more information is needed on this comparatively poorly known species.

In 2019, it was listed as a least concern species in the Red List of the IUCN. International trade in B. lidderdalii is restricted under CITES Appendix II.

Habitat loss due to excessive felling of forests may be a significant threat regionally.

The Thai subspecies, found in northern Thailand around Chiang Mai is considered to be a relict population and hundreds of specimens were collected annually for the specimen. It is now believed to be extinct, probably due to loss of the population and damage to its habitat by forest fire. They are currently an endangered species.

== Habitat ==
Bhutanitis lidderdalii flies from 5,000 to 9,000 feet (1,500 to 2,700 m) in its Indian range. It generally keeps to the ridges rather than the valleys.

== Habits ==
Flies at tree-top level, with a slow, drifting, unpredictable flight akin to that of the tree nymph (Idea lynceus). The butterflies transparent greyish underside makes it difficult to distinguish in the shadows. During rain, it sits on leaves with the forewings drooped over the hindwings, concealing its bright upper colouration. The butterfly has a habit of hill-topping and visits flowers of diverse species.

Mr. Doherty found this beautiful insect in considerable numbers in the Naga hills. Speaking of its habits and the localities in which it occurs, he says: "It generally keeps to the ridges, occasionally descending into the valley, once almost down to 5000 feet. Afterwards I found it on the western side of Japoo at 7000-8000 feet, and between the two places we got one or two every day. At Mas, in Manipur, I have taken worn specimens at 7500-9000 feet. My Lepchas, who collected at Buxa in Bhutan, say there is no chance of another brood.... The butterfly drifts about among the tree tops, rarely descending to the ground; the crimson of the hind wings is not so conspicuous as one might think, and if one loses sight of it for an instant, it is very hard to make out again, its transparent dark grey wings being hardly distinguishable among the shadows, and it is blown about by the wind more like a dead leaf than a living insect. Its flight is much like that of Hestia but less buoyant and circling, as might be expected from its angular wings; nevertheless its resemblance strikes once. Seen from above it must be much more conspicuous and in no doubt a protected insect; at the same time its weak flight may even add to its chance of escape as it certainly does with Hestia, for it is impossible to calculate the direction in which it is making. The whole body and wings give out a delicious odour, which remains for some days after death. In some positions and at some distance Armandia looks like Danais tytia, Gray, which is very common in the same places. Armandia hovers about flowers like other Papilios. During rain it alights on a leaf and droops its forewings over the hindones, thus covering the bright colours." The late Capt. Watson, who recorded this insect from the Chin Hills in Burma states that it is single-brooded. Mr. Doherty however, in the Naga Hills, took several specimens in good condition towards the end of September, so that apparently there is an autumn brood in some localities.

— C. T. Bingham

== Life cycle ==
It is known to have two broods - the first in May and June and the second from August to October. Likely to be unpalatable due to its food plant being Aristolochia species.

== Food plant ==
Larva on Aristolochia species such as A. kaempferii, A. mandshuriensis, A. griffithii, A. shimadai and A. debilis (Igarashi, 1985, 1989).

== See also ==
- Papilionidae
- List of butterflies of India
- List of butterflies of India (Papilionidae)
