= Bob Atkinson (footballer, born 1913) =

Australian rules footballer (1913–2006)

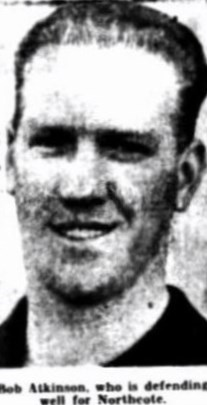
- Atkinson during his Carlton career

Personal information
- Full name: Robert Charles Atkinson
- Born: 29 October 1913; Coburg, Victoria
- Died: 25 December 2006 (aged 93)
- Original team: South Camberwell
- Debut: Round 2, 1942, Carlton vs. South Melbourne, at Princes Park
- Height: 173 cm (5 ft 8 in)
- Weight: 80 kg (176 lb)

Playing career^{1}
Years	Club	Games (Goals)
1942–1944	Carlton	44 (0)
- ^{1} Playing statistics correct to the end of 1944.

Robert Charles Atkinson (29 October 1913 – 25 December 2006) was an Australian rules footballer in the Victorian Football Association (VFA) and Victorian Football League (VFL).

== Family ==
Atkinson's father Percy played for Norwood Football Club in the South Australian competition, while his brother Ted played for North Melbourne Football Club and his son John played with Fitzroy Football Club.

== Football ==
A defender, Atkinson made his senior football debut for the Coburg Football Club in the VFA in 1935. He became a star player at the club over the following seven years, and was a member of the club's losing 1941 grand final team. When the VFA went into recess, Atkinson crossed to the Carlton Football Club on a wartime permit, and played there for three years from 1942 until 1944, stepping up as club interim captain in 1944. After the wartime permits system concluded, Atkinson returned to Coburg as captain in 1945, leading the club for two seasons; he played a total of 116 games for Coburg across his career. He was cleared to Northcote in 1947, and played one season there before switching to country football with St. James in the Benalla Tungamah Football League, playing in their 1948 premiership.

== Honours ==
He was selected in the back-pocket of Coburg's "Team of the Century".

== Sources ==
- Atkinson, G. (1982) Everything you ever wanted to know about Australian rules football but couldn't be bothered asking, The Five Mile Press: Melbourne. ISBN 0 86788 009 0.
