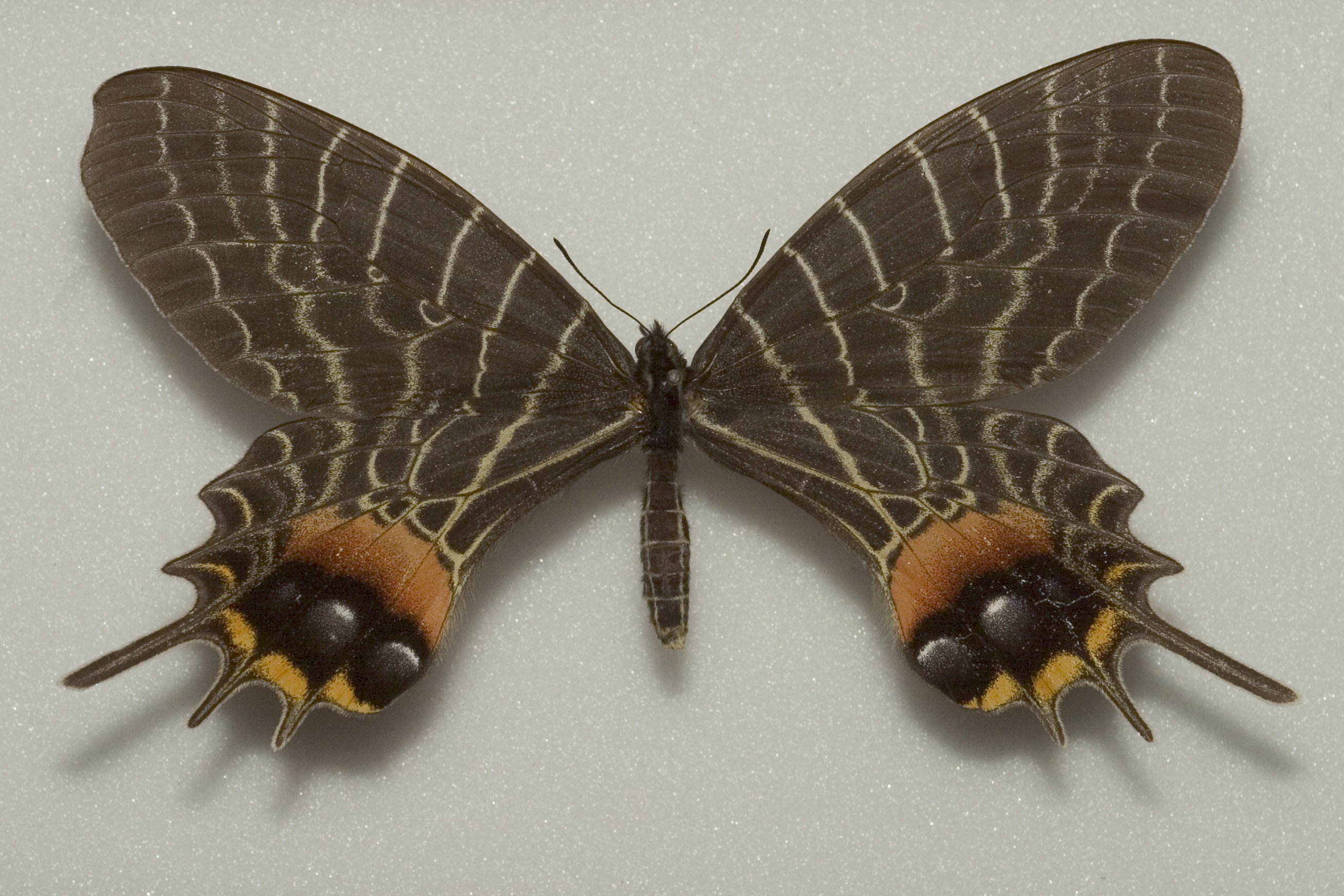
- Bhutan glory, Bhutanitis lidderdalii

Scientific classification
- Kingdom: Animalia
- Phylum: Arthropoda
- Class: Insecta
- Order: Lepidoptera
- Family: Papilionidae
- Tribe: Zerynthiini
- Genus: Bhutanitis; Atkinson, 1873

Species
- See text

= Bhutanitis =

Genus of butterflies

Bhutanitis is a genus of swallowtail butterflies that contains four species.

== Distribution ==
The genus reaches its peak diversity in south-western China, particularly Yunnan and Sichuan (Chou, 2000), and adjacent Bhutan. Bhutanitis lidderdali is the most widespread species, occurring in China, Bhutan, India and Myanmmar (Chou, 2000); it is however locally extinct in Thailand due to habitat destruction. Larval host plants known to date are all Aristolochiaceae.

All Bhutanitis species are listed on CITES Appendix II, which restricts their international trade. Historically, they have been highly desired by butterfly collectors; three species in particular (B. mansfieldi, B. ludlowi and B. thaidina) were known from very few specimens until comparatively recently. However, large numbers of specimens of B. thaidina and B. mansfieldi pulchristriata have recently been available at very low prices, mainly from China, which indicates collector demand may be becoming satisfied.

== Taxonomy ==
Two other taxa named as species of Bhutanitis (B. nigrilima Chou, 1992, B. yulongensis Chou, 1992) have since been synonymised with B. thaidina (Hauser et al. 2005). Another taxon, originally named as B. mansfieldi pulchristriata Saigusa and Lee, 1982, was also regarded as a separate species by Chou (1994) and Chou (2000), but has otherwise been regarded as a subspecies (Hauser et al., 2005).

=== Species ===
Image	Scientific name	Common name	Distribution
	Bhutanitis lidderdalii	Bhutan glory	Bhutan, parts of northeastern India and of Southeast Asia.
	Bhutanitis thaidina	Chinese three tailed swallowtail	China.
	Bhutanitis mansfieldi	Mansfield's three-tailed swallowtail	China.
	Bhutanitis ludlowi	Ludlow's Bhutan swallowtail	Bhutan and India
