= Robert Atkinson =

Robert Atkinson may refer to:

- Robert Atkinson (architect) (1883–1952), English Art Deco architect
- Robert Atkinson (businessman) (1916–2015), British businessman and Royal Navy officer
- Robert Atkinson (footballer, born 1998), English professional footballer
- Robert Atkinson (MP), Member of Parliament for Appleby
- Robert Atkinson (philologist) (1839–1908), English scholar
- Robert D. Atkinson (born 1954), American economist
- Robert d'Escourt Atkinson (1898–1982), British astronomer
- R. Frank Atkinson (1869–1923), British architect
- Robert Jones Atkinson (1820–1871), American politician from the state of Ohio
- Robert P. Atkinson (1927–2012), bishop in the Episcopal Church
- Rob Atkinson (footballer, born 1987), English professional footballer
- Rob Atkinson (surgeon) (born 1947), Australian orthopaedic surgeon
- Bob Atkinson (footballer, born 1913) (1913–2006), Australian rules footballer
- Bob Atkinson (footballer, born 1930) (1930–2017), Australian rules footballer
- Bob Atkinson (police officer), Commissioner of the Queensland Police Service
- J. Robert Atkinson (1887–1964), founder of the Universal Braille Press in 1919
