= Henry Atkinson =

Henry Atkinson may refer to:

- Henry Atkinson (priest) (1874–1960), Anglican priest in Australia
- Henry Atkinson (scientist) (1781–1824), British mathematician and astronomer
- Henry Atkinson (soldier) (1782–1842), U.S. army officer during the Black Hawk War
- Henry Dresser Atkinson (1841–1921), 19th-century Australian naturalist and clergyman
- Henry Farmer-Atkinson (1828–1913), born Henry John Atkinson, English politician
- Henry Wallace Atkinson (1866–1938), architect in Brisbane, Queensland, Australia

== See also ==
- Henry Atkinson manuscript, an early (1694–95) music manuscript in Northumberland
- Harry Atkinson (disambiguation)
