= Harold Atkinson =

Harold Atkinson may refer to:

- Harold M. Atkinson, screenwriter of The Ace of Scotland Yard
- Harold Atkinson (footballer) (1925–2003), English footballer
- Harold Atkinson (RAF officer) (1918–1940), British flying ace of the Second World War
- Harold C. Atkinson (1900–1977), Canadian politician in the Legislative Assembly of New Brunswick

== See also ==
- Harry Atkinson (disambiguation)
