= Harry Atkinson (disambiguation) =

Harry Atkinson (1831–1892) was a New Zealand Premier.

Harry Atkinson may also refer to:

- Harry Atkinson (baseball) (1874–1953), American baseball player
- Harry Atkinson (cricketer) (1881–1959), English cricketer
- Harry Atkinson (physicist) (1929–2018), New Zealand-born British physicist and science administrator
- Harry Atkinson (RAF officer) (born c. 1964), British Royal Air Force officer
- Harry Atkinson (rugby union) (1888–1949), New Zealand rugby union player
- Harry Atkinson (socialist) (1867–1956), New Zealand engineer, socialist and insurance agent
- Harry E. Atkinson (1920–2001), mayor of Newport News, Virginia
- Harry Atkinson (bowls), South African lawn bowler

== See also ==
- Harold Atkinson (disambiguation)
- Henry Atkinson (disambiguation)
