= HMS Lorna =

History

United Kingdom
- Name: SY Beryl
- Owner: Wyndham Francis Cook (1904–1905); John Burns, 1st Baron Inverclyde (1905–1911)
- Builder: Scotts Shipbuilding and Engineering Company, Greenock
- Yard number: 388
- Launched: 31 August 1904
- Fate: Sold, 1911

United Kingdom
- Name: SY Lorna
- Owner: Samuel Morley, 1st Baron Hollenden
- Acquired: 1911
- Fate: Requisitioned by the Admiralty, 1914

United Kingdom
- Name: HMS Lorna (024)
- Acquired: 30 September 1914
- Fate: Returned to owner, 2 February 1919

United Kingdom
- Name: SY Lorna
- Owner: Walter Preston
- Fate: Requisitioned by the Admiralty, 1939

United Kingdom
- Name: HMS Lorna (4.65)
- Acquired: September 1939
- Fate: Returned to owner, 1943

Greece
- Name: Thessalia (1947); Glaros (1960)
- Owner: Kavounides Bros
- Acquired: July 1947
- Fate: Sank at Piraeus, 14 December 1966, raised and scrapped at Perama 1968

General characteristics
- Tonnage: 484 grt 548 grt (1960)
- Length: 168.5 ft 0 in (51.36 m)
- Beam: 25.2 ft 0 in (7.68 m)
- Propulsion: steam; diesel from 1960; 2 screws
- Speed: 13 knots (24 km/h; 15 mph)
- Armament: 2 x QF 6-pounder Hotchkiss (1914); 1 x QF 12 pounder 12 cwt naval gun (1939)

HMS Lorna was a British armed yacht which served in the Royal Navy. Originally built in 1904 as a luxury steam yacht, she served in both the First and Second World Wars and destroyed a German U-boat in 1918. After the war, she became a passenger vessel in Greece, but sank in 1966 and was scrapped two years later.

== History ==
=== Luxury yacht ===
The vessel was completed in October 1904 at Scotts Shipbuilding and Engineering Company, Greenock on the River Clyde in Scotland and was named Beryl. She had been ordered by Wyndham Francis Cook, the son of Francis Cook, 1st Viscount of Monserrate, a wealthy textiles merchant; however, Wyndham died in May 1905. It was purchased in that year by the shipbuilder, John Burns, 1st Baron Inverclyde, and in 1911 to Samuel Morley, 1st Baron Hollenden, a former Governor of the Bank of England, who renamed the yacht Lorna.

=== First World War ===
At the outbreak of war in August 1914, the yacht was requisitioned and hired by the Admiralty as an armed patrol vessel. Equipped with two 6-pounder guns and depth charges. Lorna probably operated as the Group Leader of a unit of the Auxiliary Patrol, both in home waters and in the Mediterranean. On the evening of 26 May 1918, Lorna was escorting a convoy off Portland Bill at the eastern end of Lyme Bay. Sighting a submarine's periscope only thirty yards away, Lorna was able to approach to ten yards before the U-boat spotted her and began to dive. Passing directly over where the periscope had been, (some accounts state that Lorna struck the periscope) Lorna dropped two depth charges resulting in a large patch of turbulence with some debris in it. Returning to recross the area, it was realised that some items in the water were actually four survivors from the U-boat, their calls for help being heard too late to prevent a third charge from being dropped. Three of the men in the water were killed instantly, the fourth was still alive when recovered but died within three hours, although not before revealing that the destroyed submarine had been the SM UB-74. Lorna was returned to her owner in February 1919, she was then sold on to Walter Preston, an engineer and Member of Parliament.

=== Second World War ===
In September 1939, the yacht was again requisitioned as an armed patrol vessel, equipped with a 12-pounder gun. She initially served with the North Atlantic Command at Fort William in Scotland. One of Lorna's captains was Robert Atkinson, who in 1980 became the chairman of British Shipbuilders. At the end of 1940 she was serving at Gibraltar and was later used as an officers' mess. She was returned to her owner in 1943.

=== Post war ===
In 1947, Lorna was sold to Kavounides Brothers of Piraeus in Greece and converted to carry passengers; she was renamed Thessalia. In 1960, she was reconstructed with a single diesel engine and renamed Glaros but sank following a collision at Piraeus on 14 December 1966. The wreck was raised and finally scrapped at Perama in 1968.
