= Peter Anderson (footballer, born 1932) =

English footballer

Personal information
- Full name: Peter Dennis Anderson
- Date of birth: 11 September 1932
- Place of birth: Devonport, England
- Date of death: 2 April 2019 (aged 86)
- Place of death: Torbay, Devon, England
- Position: Outside forward

Senior career*
Years	Team	Apps	(Gls)
	Oak Villa	?	(?)
1950–1962	Plymouth Argyle	241	(41)
1962–1964	Torquay United	77	(18)
1964–1966	Bideford	?	(?)
- * Club domestic league appearances and goals

Peter Dennis Anderson (11 September 1932 – 2 April 2019) was an English professional footballer who made more than 300 appearances in the Football League playing as an outside forward for Plymouth Argyle and Torquay United.

Anderson was born in Devonport, and began his career with local Devon side Oak Villa. He signed for Plymouth Argyle in July 1950, and made his league debut in April 1953 against Brentford in the Second Division at Home Park. He stayed at Plymouth for more than 12 years, clocking up 259 appearances and 46 goals in all competitions. In December 1962, he moved to Torquay United, scoring on his debut in a 2–0 home win against Hartlepools United on 2 February 1963. He made 77 league appearances and scored 18 goals for Torquay. He remained a regular until the 1964–65 season when he lost his place to Bill Atkinson, before moving into non-league football with Bideford, where a broken leg forced him to retire in 1966.
