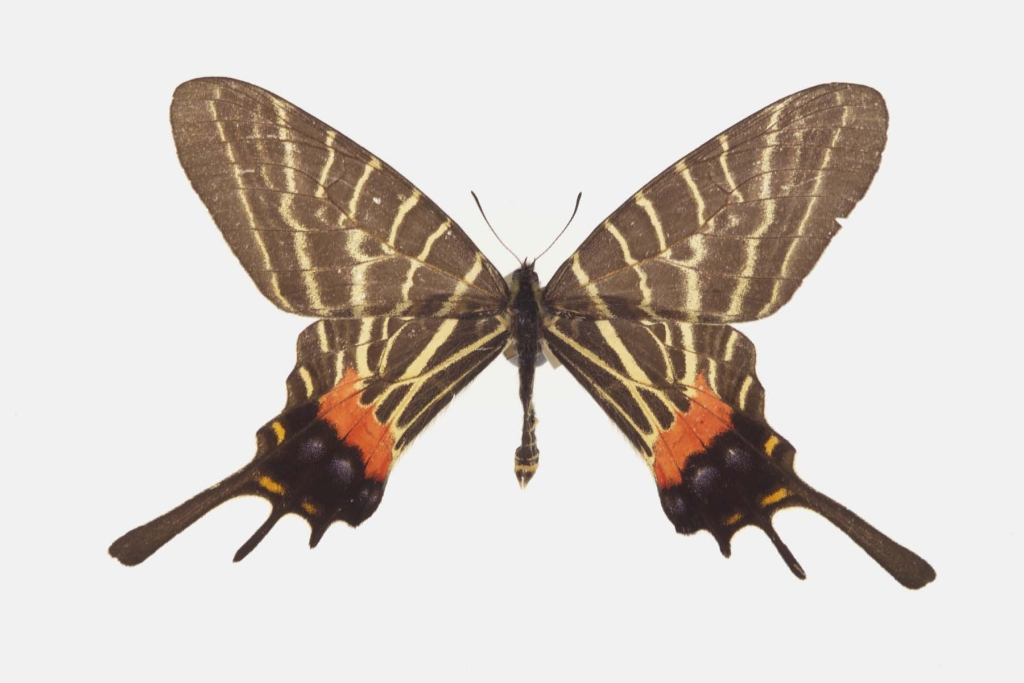

Conservation status
- Near Threatened (IUCN 3.1)
- CITES Appendix II (CITES)

Scientific classification
- Kingdom: Animalia
- Phylum: Arthropoda
- Class: Insecta
- Order: Lepidoptera
- Family: Papilionidae
- Genus: Bhutanitis
- Species: B. thaidina

Binomial name
- Bhutanitis thaidina Blanchard, 1871

Synonyms
- Armandia thaidina

= Bhutanitis thaidina =

Chinese three-tailed swallowtail

Species of butterfly

Bhutanitis thaidina, commonly known as the Chinese three-tailed swallowtail, is a rare species of butterfly in the family Papilionidae.

The butterfly is found in Tibet and China. The larva feeds on Aristolochia Aristolochia moupinensis.

== Subspecies ==
- B. t. thaidina
- B. t. dongchuaensis
