= Bhutanitis mansfieldi =

Mansfield's three-tailed swallowtail

Conservation status
- Vulnerable (IUCN 3.1)
- CITES Appendix II

Scientific classification
- Kingdom: Animalia
- Phylum: Arthropoda
- Class: Insecta
- Order: Lepidoptera
- Family: Papilionidae
- Genus: Bhutanitis
- Species: B. mansfieldi

Binomial name
- Bhutanitis mansfieldi (Riley 1939)

Species of butterfly

Bhutanitis mansfieldi, the Mansfield's three-tailed swallowtail, is a species of butterfly in the family Papilionidae. It is endemic to China.
