= Consumers' Association of Canada =

- Formation: 1947
- Type: Consumer organization
- Legal status: Active
- Purpose: Consumer advocacy
- Headquarters: Ottawa, Ontario, Canada
- Region served: Canada
- Official language: English, French
- National President: Bruce Cran
- Website: www.consumer.ca: account suspended

The Consumers' Association of Canada, founded in 1947, is a Canadian independent, volunteer-based, consumer organization. Based nationally in Ottawa with regional branches in Montreal, Saskatoon, Winnipeg and Vancouver, the organization focuses on the social problems of food distribution and health, trade, standards, and communications and financial services.

Their aim is to raise consumer awareness of marketplace issues, and to facilitate government and industrial coordination to tackle marketplace difficulties.

Isabel Atkinson served as national president from 1956 to 1960.

== Archives ==
There is a Consumers' Association of Canada fond at Library and Archives Canada. The archival reference number is R3572, former archival reference number MG28-I200. The fond covers the date range 1947 to 1983. It consists of 3.15 meters of textual records and holds the following series': Board of Directors, Executive Committee and annual meetings; Consumer's Association of Canada committees; Briefs, reports and submissions; Correspondence; Speeches and notes; Subject files.
