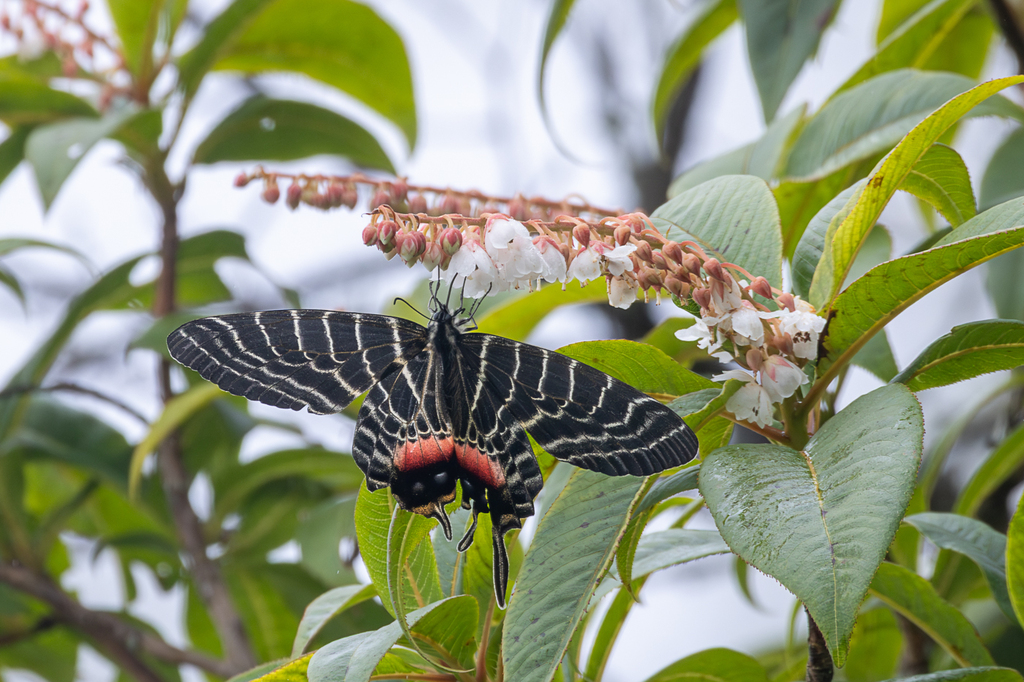

Conservation status
- Endangered (IUCN 3.1)
- CITES Appendix II

Scientific classification
- Kingdom: Animalia
- Phylum: Arthropoda
- Clade: Pancrustacea
- Class: Insecta
- Order: Lepidoptera
- Family: Papilionidae
- Genus: Bhutanitis
- Species: B. ludlowi

Binomial name
- Bhutanitis ludlowi Gabriel, 1942

= Bhutanitis ludlowi =

Species of butterfly

Bhutanitis ludlowi, the Ludlow's Bhutan swallowtail, is a species of butterfly in the family Papilionidae, endemic to Bhutan and recently recorded in India. It belongs to the subfamily Parnassiinae subfamily which also contains the Apollo butterflies.

== History ==
Until recently, Bhutanitis ludlowi was poorly known, and despite recent studies, its biology and distribution are still not entirely known. The taxon was originally known from a series of five specimens collected in Bhutan during 1933–1934 by the botanists Frank Ludlow and George Sheriff. Four of these specimens were referred to in the type description, which contained little information on the species' biology other than they were collected at an altitudinal range of 2000–2200 metres in the forest.

In 1992, Chou claimed that a specimen of B. ludlowi had been collected in Yunnan and had been lodged in a Chinese collection. Although this record was questioned by subsequent authors, a later publication by Chou (2000) did not provide additional information. Although Chou (2000) illustrated a specimen, it was later determined to be a retouched photo of the type specimen in the British Museum (Natural History). As no specimen has demonstrably been collected in China, Bollino and Racheli (2012) argued that the record was a misidentification of Bhutanitis lidderdalii spinosa.

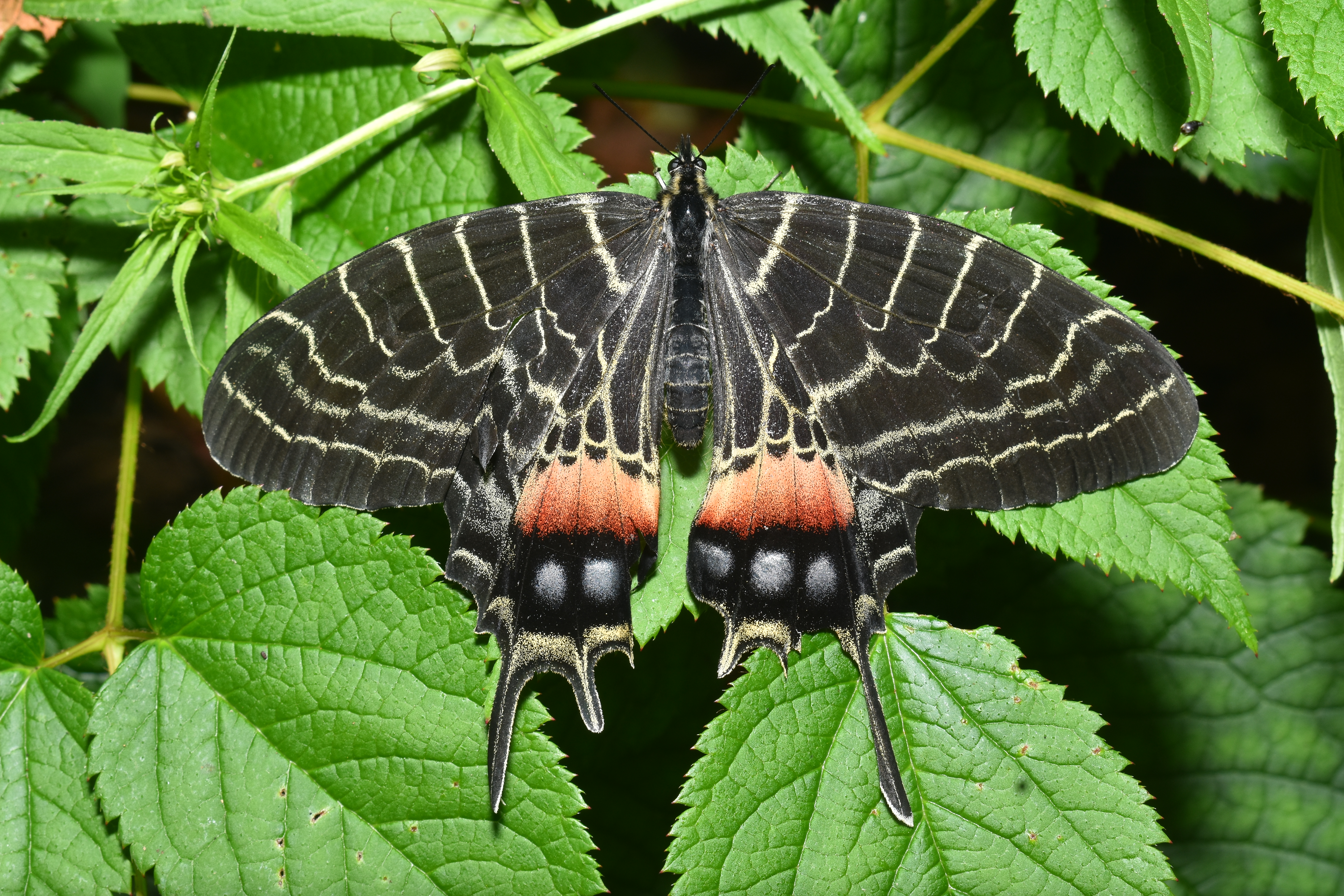
Open wing position of Bhutanitis ludlowi Gabriel, 1942 - Mystical Bhutan Glory

In August 2009, Karma Wangdi, a Bhutanese forestry officer, collected a specimen of B. ludlowi in the Bumdeling Wildlife Sanctuary, located in Bhutan's remote Trashiyangtse Valley. This specimen provided the first unambiguous evidence in some 75 years that the species was extant. In August 2011, some mating [IUCN] pairs of B. ludlowi were sighted and captured at Bumdelling Wildlife Sanctuary in Bhutan by a research team from Bhutan in collaboration with the Butterfly Society of Japan (BSJ) and NHK Japan (Bhutan government official release 2011; Kuenzang 2011). The expedition sighted their first B. ludlowi on August 12, the same date that Ludlow and Sheriff took the first specimen in 1933. Bhutanitis ludlowi subsequently became the national butterfly of Bhutan.

== Biology ==
The 2011 expedition also revealed considerable biological information about B. ludlowi (Choden, 2011). Its host plant is Aristolochia griffithi, which is also utilised as a host plant by other Bhutanitis taxa. Bhutanitis ludlowi eggs are smaller than in other Bhutanitis and are laid on top of each other in a stacked pile arrangement. Video footage of live adults (external links 3 and 4) show that their flight is rapid with a deep wingbeat and frequent gliding. The forewings provide all propulsion, while the hindwings are unpowered during normal flight and trail behind the butterfly. Unlike many swallowtail butterflies, B. ludlowi does not continuously flutter its wings while feeding. Viburnum cylindricum flowers were the most commonly used adult food source.

In 2012, a photograph was taken of a live specimen of B. ludlowi in or adjacent to the Eaglenest Wildlife Sanctuary, Arunachal Pradesh (Padmanabhan, 2012). This record comes from an area where Bhutanitis lidderdalii lidderdalii also occurs, suggesting these taxa are sympatric, or at least nearly so (based on data from photographs of B. lidderdalii shown on the Indian Foundation for Butterflies, Butterflies of India website). Currently, the distribution of the species is known to be restricted to the pocket habitats of Bhutan and the West Kameng district of Arunachal Pradesh, India.

As so few specimens are known, B. ludlowi is rarely illustrated. It is similar in appearance to the allied B. lidderdalii but has broader wings with the transverse bands grey instead of white (Chou, 2000).

Very little work has been done to understand the biology of Bhutanitis ludlowi. Research initiatives undertaken in Bhutan provide some answers to its life (Dendup et al., 2023). The first large-scale effort to study the behaviour and biology of Bhutantis ludlowi was started in 2023 by Sarika Baidya in India.

== Status ==
As with all other members of the genus Bhutanitis, B. ludlowi is listed on Appendix II of CITES, restricting any international trade. As of 2023, it is one of the most expensive swallowtail butterfly in the trade and is highly sought after by collectors (Wang et al., 2023). Its most recent IUCN assessment is endangered(Fernando & Kunte, 2019). Although collecting butterflies in Bhutan is prohibited, the BSJ is building butterfly rearing capacity with the Bhutanese government for B. ludlowi and other species.

== Bhutan Glory Conservation Project ==
The first dedicated conservation initiative for the species in India was launched in 2023 by Nature Mates – Nature Club, led by Sarika Baidya under the Conservation Leadership Programme. This project represents the first structured effort to generate baseline data on the species' population, distribution, and life history in India. This is also the first conservation project in India to focus on a single butterfly species.

Fieldwork under the Bhutan Glory Conservation project has included systematic surveys, habitat mapping, and documentation of larval host and nectar plants, as well as the first detailed observations of the species' life cycle in India. The initiative also aims to generate ecological data and monitoring frameworks for the species, that is largely absent for the species.

Subsequent support has been provided through the Rapid Action Project grant from the Wildlife Trust of India, which has contributed to threat assessment, capacity building, and continued outreach activities. Workshops and training programmes conducted between 2024 and 2026 have further strengthened collaboration between researchers, forest officials, and local communities.

The Bhutan Glory Conservation Project largely focuses on community engagement and empowerment. A major component of the conservation strategy involves community participation. The project has engaged local stakeholders, including members of the local Bugun and Sherdukpen communities and the Arunachal Pradesh Forest Department, through awareness programmes including trainings, workshops and conferences. These efforts have focused on promoting the protection of host and nectar plants, reducing anthropogenic pressures, and integrating butterfly conservation into local stewardship practices. The initiative has also promoted the Ludlow's Bhutan Glory as a flagship species for habitat conservation and sustainable ecotourism. In 2025, the project team, led by Sarika Baidya, collaborated with the Bugun communities to assign names for B. ludlowi and B. lidderdalii in the local Bugun language. The name given for B. ludlowi is Lachhan jiing-khonok and for B. lidderdalii Sharuwa jiingh-khonok, to signify their altitudinal niche (jiing-khonok means 'butterfly' in Bugun; Lachhan and Sharuwa are the local names for their respective habitats in Bugun). This initiative is the first-ever effort in India to name a butterfly in an indigenous language.

Bhutanitis ludlowi is currently facing threats from habitat degradation, unsustainable activities, illegal collection and climate change. The Bhutan Glory Conservation Project is the only known effort to dedicately conserve the endangered Ludlow's Bhutan Glory butterfly.
