= Thomas Atkinson (divine) =

English divine and dramatist

Thomas Atkinson (1600–1639) was an English divine and dramatist.

Atkinson entered Merchant Taylors' School in August 1608. Seven years later he was elected scholar of St John's College, Oxford, during the presidency of Laud, and, graduating in 1619, proceeded to the degree of B.D. in 1630. After filling the office of senior proctor of the university, Atkinson accepted the living of South Warnborough in Hampshire, to which he was inducted 20 Jan. 1637–8. Towards the end of the same year, by virtue of an exchange with Dr. Peter Heylin, he became rector of Islip, near Oxford, and, dying a few weeks later, was buried in St John's College chapel 6 Feb. 1638–9.

Atkinson is not known to have published anything; but he wrote two Latin poems, directed against Andrew Melvin, and styled ‘Andrei Melvini Anti-Tami-Cunicategoria’ and ‘Melvinus delirans’ respectively. A Latin tragedy entitled ‘Homo,’ bearing the signature Thomas Atkinson, may (almost certainly) be ascribed to the same author on these grounds: (1) It was dedicated to Laud in his capacity of president (Præses colendissime), which implies that a member of St John's College wrote it; (2) There was at St John's, during Laud's time, only one Thomas Atkinson of any note as a scholar. The manuscript of ‘Homo’ is preserved in the Harleian collection of the British Library, Harley MS 6925.
