= Richard Atkinson =

Richard Atkinson may refer to:

- Richard Atkinson (bishop) (born 1958), British Anglican bishop
- Richard C. Atkinson (born 1929), American psychologist and former president of the University of California
- Richard J. C. Atkinson (1920–1994), British prehistorian and archaeologist
- Richard Merrill Atkinson (1894–1947), U.S. Representative from Tennessee
- Rick Atkinson (born 1952), American journalist and author
- Ricky Atkinson (born 1965), American footballer

== See also ==
- Dick Atkinson (born 1934), Australian rules footballer
