= Paul Atkinson =

Paul Atkinson may refer to:

- Paul Atkinson (basketball) (born 1999), American basketball player
- Paul Atkinson (confessor) (1655–1729), English Roman Catholic priest
- Paul Atkinson (footballer, born 1961), English football player who played for Oldham, Watford and Burnley
- Paul Atkinson (footballer, born 1966), English football player who played for Sunderland and Port Vale
- Paul Atkinson (guitarist) (1946–2004), pop guitarist in The Zombies
