= Robert Atkinson (businessman) =

British businessman and decorated Royal Navy officer

Sir Robert Atkinson DSC** RD FREng
- Robert Atkinson being interviewed for the BBC/A&E television series Decisive Weapons (1997)

Chairman of British Shipbuilders
- In office 1980–1984
- Preceded by: Sir Anthony Griffin
- Succeeded by: Sir Graham Day

Personal details
- Born: 7 March 1916
- Died: 25 January 2015 (aged 98)
- Citizenship: United Kingdom
- Spouse(s): Joyce Forster (m. 1941–1973) Margaret Hazel Walker (m. 1977–2015)
- Education: University of London
- Civilian awards: Knight Bachelor (1983)

Military service
- Allegiance: United Kingdom
- Branch/service: Royal Navy
- Years of service: 1939?–1946
- Military awards: Distinguished Service Cross (3)

Sir Robert Atkinson, DSC & Two Bars, RD, FREng (7 March 1916 – 25 January 2015) was a British businessman and decorated Royal Navy officer. He served in the Royal Navy during World War II and was awarded the Distinguished Service Cross three times. Later, he was a businessman involved in shipbuilding and served as Chairman of British Shipbuilders from 1980 to 1984.

== Early life ==
Atkinson was born on 7 March 1916 in Tynemouth, England. He was one of three sons born to Nicholas Ridley Atkinson, a civil engineer with the Tynemouth Improvement Commission, and his wife Margaret. He was educated at a grammar school, and then studied engineering at the University of London.

His older brother was The Reverend Canon Professor James Atkinson, who was a Church of England priest and academic specialising in Martin Luther and the Protestant Reformation. His other brother died in March 1943 with the sinking of a merchant ship on which he was serving. It had been torpedoed and Robert was close enough to his brother's vessel to hear its distress signal over his ship's radio but not close enough to reach it before it sank.

== Military career ==
Following the completion of his university degree, Atkinson joined the Royal Naval Reserve. He was promoted from acting sub-lieutenant to sub lieutenant on 13 August 1939. His first command was a requisitioned private yacht, HMS Lorna, which he sailed from the United Kingdom to Gibraltar. From there, he was to conduct irregular operations in the Mediterranean Sea. One such operation was the seizure of an Italian tanker carrying aviation fuel, which he then sailed back to the UK. He later described the act, committed against a country that had yet to enter World War II, as 'pure act of piracy'. On 23 September 1940, he was promoted to lieutenant and granted seniority in that rank from 1 May 1940.

He was awarded his first Distinguished Service Cross in 1941. He was the second-in-command of HMS Rhododendron, a Flower-class corvette, and was involved in the dangerous duty of convoy escort. He took command of another Flower-class corvette, HMS Pink, in 1942 and escorted three crucial convoys, including ONS 5 in spring 1943. He was awarded his second DSC for his actions during this mission, which included a possible sinking of a U-boat. He received his third in 1945 for sinking German submarine U-878 in the Castle-class corvette HMS Tintagel Castle.

Atkinson was demobbed in 1946.

== Business career ==
Following the war, Atkinson studied engineering at London University and McGill University, Montreal. Returning to the UK, he entered business and held managerial positions at William Doxford, Tube Investments, Unicorn Industries and Aurora Steel. In 1980, he was appointed Chairman of British Shipbuilders. He retired from that position in 1984.

== Personal life ==
In 1941, Atkinson married Joyce Forster. Together they had two children; one son and one daughter. His first wife died in 1973. In 1977, he married Margaret Hazel Walker. They did not have any children.

Atkinson died on 25 January 2015, at the age of 98. He was survived by his daughter and his second wife.

== Honours ==
On 4 March 1941, Atkinson was awarded the Distinguished Service Cross (DSC) 'for courage and skill in a successful action against an enemy submarine in heavy seas'. On 19 October 1943, he was awarded a bar to his Distinguished Service Cross (IE awarded the DSC for a second time) "For gallantry and devotion to duty in determined and successful attacks on U-boats while serving in H.M. Ships Duncan, Pink, Sunflower, Vidette, Tay, Loosestrife, Alisma, Spey, Pelican, Jed, Snowflake and Lagan on Convoy Escort duty". He was also mentioned in despatches in 1943, and awarded a second bar to his DSC in 1944.

In 1947, Atkinson was awarded the Decoration for Officers of the Royal Naval Reserve, commonly known as the Reserve Decoration (RD), for long service in the Royal Naval Reserve. He was made a Knight Bachelor in 1983, and therefore granted the title sir. He elected Fellow of the Royal Academy of Engineering (FREng) in 1983.
