= John Augustus Atkinson =

English artist and engraver (c. 1775 – 1830)

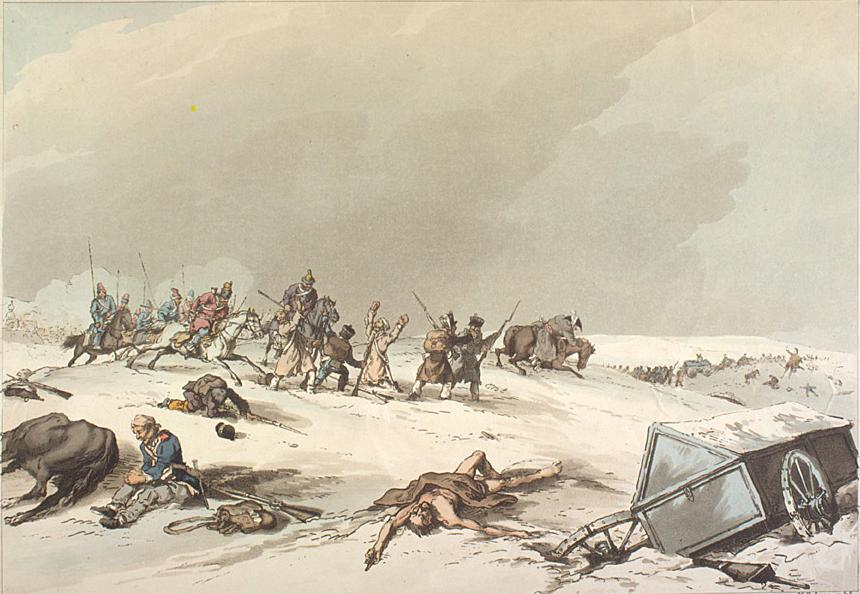
Retreat of the French Grand Army from Moscow, intercepted by Russian Cossack, 1812, published January 1813

John Augustus Atkinson (c. 1775 – 25 March 1830) was an English artist and engraver.

== Life ==
Atkinson was born in London. In 1784, he went to St. Petersburg to his uncle James Walker, engraver to the empress Catherine the Great. There he studied in the picture galleries, encouraged by Catherine and her son Paul I, and was commissioned by Paul to paint large pictures of Russian history.

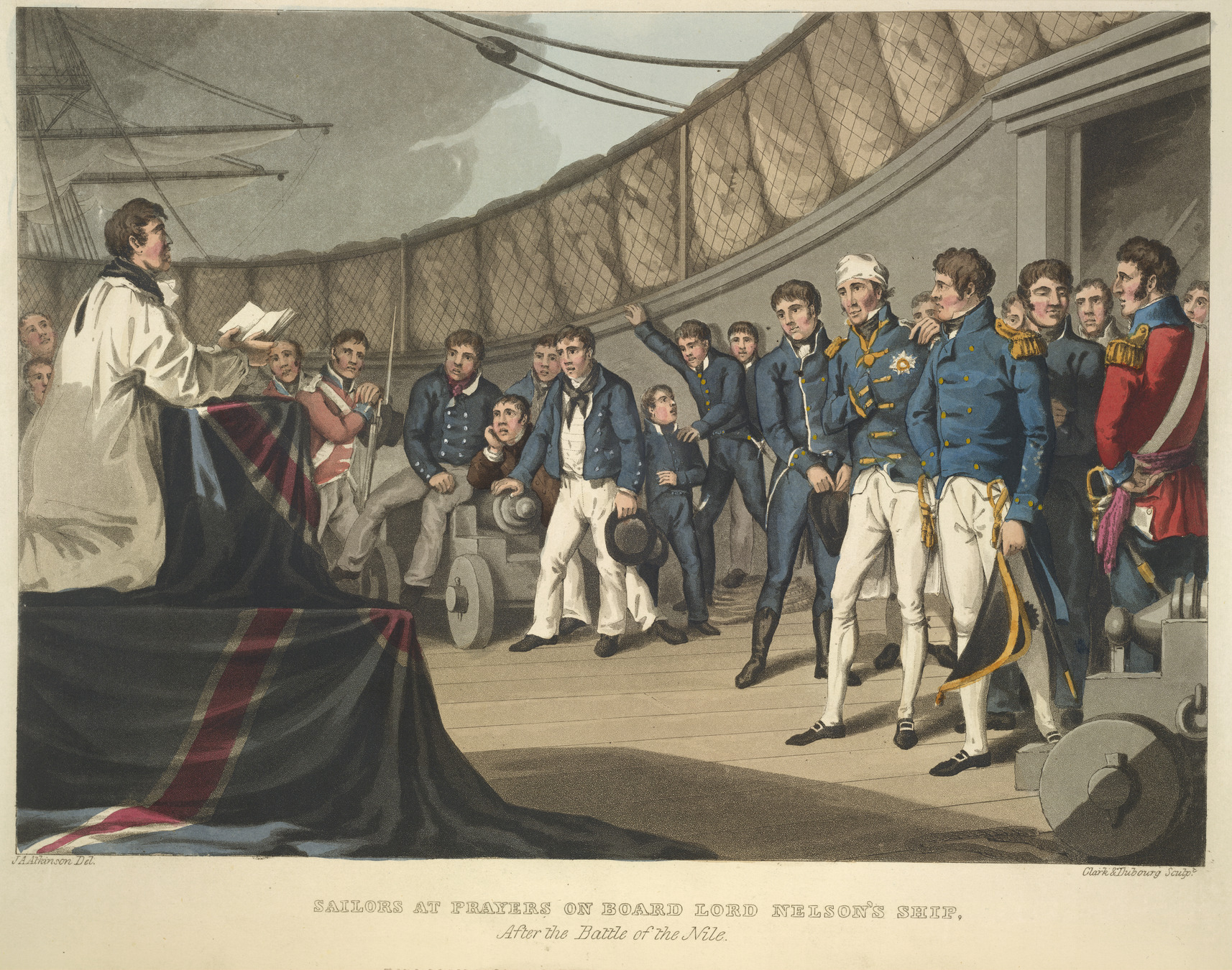
Sailors at Prayer on board Lord Nelson's Ship (after the Battle of the Nile).

In 1801, Atkinson returned to England, and in 1803 published A Picturesque Representation of the Manners, Customs, and Amusements of the Russians, in 100 plates, drawn and etched by himself. He also painted in watercolours and in 1808 was elected to the Society of Painters in Water Colours. Many of his works, during the Napoleonic Wars, were of naval subjects. He painted many battle scenes including a Battle of Waterloo, which was engraved by John Burnet.

His last contribution to the Royal Academy exhibition was in 1829. He died on 25 March 1830 in London. His will was dated 1830.

== Selected works ==
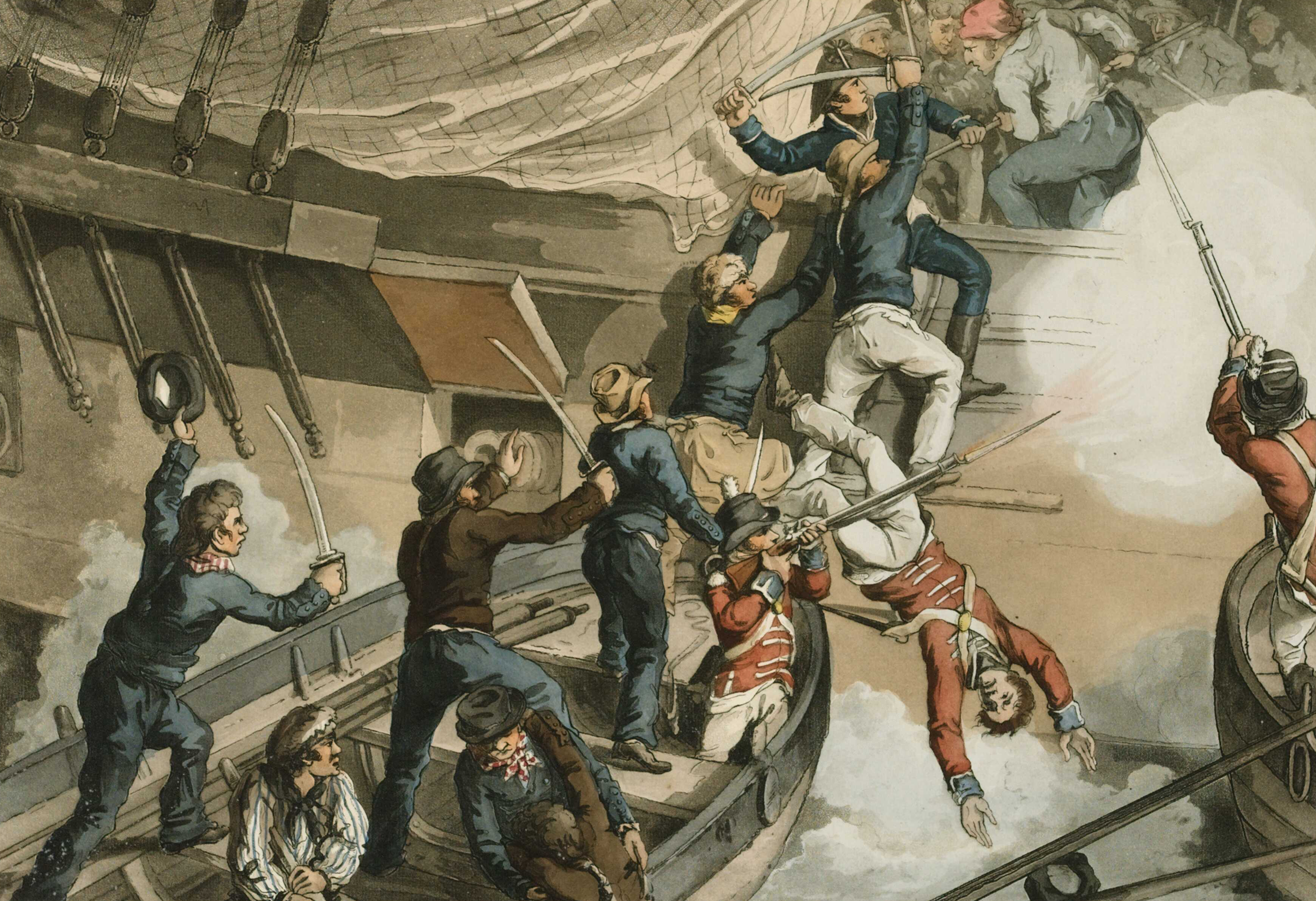
British Sailors Boarding a Man of War - depicting the recapture of HMS Hermione by the crew of HMS Surprise.

- Carriage on Sledges 1803 Art Gallery of Greater Victoria, British Columbia
- A Russian Village 1804 Art Gallery of Greater Victoria, British Columbia
- Golubtza 1804 Art Gallery of Greater Victoria, British Columbia
- Village Amusements 1804 Art Gallery of Greater Victoria, British Columbia
- Scene from Tom Jones Courtauld Institute of Art, London
- The Slack Rope Courtauld Institute of Art, London
- A Belgian Waggon with Four Horses Tate Gallery, London
- Illustrations to Ossian The Huntington Library, California
- Heaving a Lead 1807 National Maritime Museum
- Greenwich Pensioners 1808 National Maritime Museum
- Skating, 1810 Tyne & Wear Museums, England
- Ships of the Reign of King Edward IV 1812 - Fine Arts Museums of San Francisco
- 42nd Highlanders at Waterloo Courtauld Institute of Art, London
- British Sailors Boarding a Man of War 1815 National Maritime Museum
