= Henry Atkinson (priest) =

Henry Brune Atkinson (17 March 1874 – 16 June 1960) was an Anglican Priest in Australia during the Twentieth Century.

== Early life and career ==
He was born in Tasmania and educated at Launceston Church Grammar School and the University of Tasmania. Ordained Deacon in 1847 and Priest in 1848, he served curacies in Deloraine and Hobart and held incumbencies at Evandale, Forth, Devonport, and Hobart. He was Archdeacon of Launceston from 1928 until 1949.
