= Jerry Atkinson =

American politician

Fitzgerald "Jerry" Atkinson Jr. (January 25, 1921 – April 21, 2006) was vice mayor of Nashville, Tennessee from 1966 to 1971.

== Early life and career ==
Atkinson was born to longtime Nashville-area residents Fitzgerald Atkinson Sr. and Catherine Kerr Atkinson. He attended Davidson County public schools, including the former Central High School, from which he graduated. Following high school Atkinson enrolled in the University of the South in Sewanee, Tennessee, but left in June 1942 to serve in the United States armed forces in World War II. He enlisted into the United States Marine Corps, serving primarily with the 1st Tank Battalion, 1st Marine Division. He was wounded in the Battle of Okinawa and was subsequently awarded the Purple Heart and the Navy Cross.

Atkinson was honorably discharged in 1946 and the same year was licensed as an insurance agent. Early in his insurance career, he was a partner in the insurance firm of Stokes, Bandy & Atkinson.

== Politics ==
While with Stokes, Bandy & Atkinson, Atkinson was first elected to the Tennessee House of Representatives. Like almost all members of the Tennessee General Assembly from the western two-thirds of the state in that era, Atkinson was at least nominally a Democrat. However, the party's Southern wing, especially at this time, was not particularly liberal, and Atkinson was in many ways somewhat typical of his era. Atkinson was to serve a total of three terms in the Tennessee House, serving Davidson and Williamson Counties as a "floterial representative", part of an arcane system which was then in use in Tennessee to avoid the constitutionally-mandated redistricting of the House according to population every ten years following the census (and which was eventually invalidated by the United States Supreme Court in its landmark Baker v. Carr ruling). In 1964 Atkinson left Stokes and Bandy to form his own insurance firm. Atkinson's service in the Tennessee General Assembly came at time when there was no actual salary but rather only an expense per diem for the days in which the legislature was actually in session; in no way was politics providing him with a substantial living.

In 1966, Atkinson was elected to an unusual five-year term as vice mayor under the Metropolitan Charter, which had been adopted by voters four years earlier to merge many of the functions of Davidson County and the Nashville municipal government. In one of the charter's many compromise provisions, most of which had been included to overcome the objections which had led to the defeat of an earlier Metropolitan Charter proposed during the 1950s, it was agreed that the second group of office holders elected under the charter would serve for five years rather than the usual four in order to take the metropolitan offices out of the election cycle for statewide offices such as governor and state legislature and holdover county offices such as property assessor, court clerk, and the like. Ostensibly this was in the interest of a shorter ballot and to give these offices the weight of importance that they deserved; to critics this provision meant to move the offices to being elected at a time when only persons with a strong interest in the local government — most notably municipal employees and their families and friends — were likely to vote.

Atkinson's primary role as vice mayor (other than to serve as the mayor's successor in the event of his death, resignation, removal from office, or excessive absence from the city) was to serve as speaker of the Metropolitan Council. Atkinson's low-key leadership style and his desire for everyone, council member and member of the public alike, to be heard on any issue on which they desired to speak, was commended by some, but was harshly condemned by others, particularly some of the council members. Members of the Metropolitan Council, one of the largest U.S. municipal legislative bodies, composed of 40 part-time members, most of whom had other jobs, often found themselves getting home after meetings in the early hours of morning after any meeting involving contentious issues, which were fairly frequent. Nonetheless, Atkinson was encouraged by some to run for mayor in 1971, even after it became apparent that incumbent mayor Beverly Briley was going to seek a third term, permissible under the term limit provision then in the Metropolitan Charter, making him the second consecutive vice mayor to challenge Briley for the top spot.

Unlike his previous races, Atkinson now faced several better-known and better-financed opponents. A total of nine candidates finally entered the race. Besides Briley and Atkinson, two other well-known Nashville political figures, Trustee Glenn Ferguson and Assessor of Property Clifford Allen were in the race. A surprise opponent was movie projectionist Casey Jenkins, who ran a campaign based on the idea of "massive resistance" to forced busing, which had just been ordered in the now-merged metropolitan school district to foster racial desegregation. Briley, Jenkins, Allen, and Ferguson all bought relatively large (for that period) amounts of television air time, which was beyond the financial ability of Atkinson's campaign. Atkinson finished fifth in the race. (Briley eventually defeated Jenkins in a runoff.)

== Later life ==
Although Atkinson never sought elected office again, he was nonetheless active in many civic and charitable activities. He was an active member of Civitan and Kiwanis, as well as the United Methodist Church. He and wife, Ruth, resided in the Otter Creek Rd area of Davidson County, which he had represented years before in the legislature. His death was attributed to congestive heart failure. He is buried at Nashville's Woodlawn Memorial Park.

== See also ==
- Navy Cross
- Battle of Okinawa
