= Mark Atkinson =

Mark Atkinson may refer to:

- Mark Atkinson (actor) (born 1980/1), American actor and filmmaker
- Mark Atkinson (footballer) (born 1970), New Zealand footballer
- Mark Atkinson (rugby union) (born 1990), English rugby union player
- Mark Atkinson (scientist) (born 1961), American scientist
- Mark N. Atkinson (born 1969), Tasmanian cricketer
- Mark P. Atkinson (born 1970), Western Australian cricketer
