= Rebecca Atkinson (disambiguation) =

Rebecca Atkinson (born 1983) is an English actress

Rebecca Atkinson may also refer to:

- Rebecca Atkinson (curler) (born 1982), Canadian curler and lawyer
- Rebecca Atkinson-Lord (fl. 2000s–2010s), British director and writer
