= Harold Atkinson (RAF officer) =

British flying ace of WWII

- Born: 19 August 1918; Wintringham, Yorkshire, England
- Died: 25 August 1940 (aged 22); English Channel
- Cause of death: Killed in action
- Burial place: Market Weighton Cemetery, Yorkshire, England
- Military career
- Allegiance: United Kingdom
- Branch: Royal Air Force
- Service years: 1937–1940
- Rank: Pilot officer
- Unit: No. 213 Squadron
- Conflicts: Second World War: Battle of France; Battle of Britain
- Awards: Distinguished Flying Cross

Harold Atkinson, DFC (19 August 1918 – 25 August 1940) was a British flying ace who served in the Royal Air Force (RAF) during the Second World War. He was credited with having shot down at least twelve aircraft.

Born in Wintringham in Yorkshire, Atkinson was a graduate of the RAF's College Cranwell in 1939 and was posted to No. 213 Squadron. He flew in the Battle of France, providing cover for the evacuation of the British Expeditionary Force from Dunkirk. He achieved a number of aerial victories during this time, which was recognised with an award of the Distinguished Flying Cross in late June 1940. His squadron was heavily engaged in the Battle of Britain, and Atkinson achieved further successes until he was shot down and killed on 25 August.

== Early life ==
Harold Derrick Atkinson was born on 19 August 1918 in Wintringham, Yorkshire, England. His father died the same year and his mother, Adelaide Atkinson, later remarried, to The Reverend David Evans. Atkinson was educated at independent schools, first at Aysgarth School before going onto Shrewsbury School, his final year being 1937. Deciding on a career in the Royal Air Force (RAF), he commenced initial officer training as a flight cadet at the RAF's College Cranwell in September the same year. He graduated from Cranwell in July 1939 and was commissioned as a pilot officer in the RAF.

== Second World War ==
At the time of the outbreak of the Second World War, Atkinson was serving with No. 213 Squadron, having been posted there on 14 August 1939. The squadron was based at the RAF station at Wittering and operated Hawker Hurricane fighters. It was tasked with carrying out patrols along the east coast of England.

=== Battle of France ===
A week after the invasion of France on 10 May 1940, No. 213 Squadron was sent to Merville to reinforce the RAF presence there. It was immediately called upon for defensive patrolling and bomber escort duties. On 19 May, northwest of Lille, Atkinson destroyed a Heinkel He 111 medium bomber. On subsequent sorties the same day he damaged a Dornier Do 17 medium bomber and shared in the destruction of a Henschel Hs 126 reconnaissance aircraft northeast of Arras and Tournai respectively. The next day, he combined with five other pilots to shoot down a Do 17 east of Courtrai and also shared in the destruction of a Hs 126 over Neuville. In an engagement over Arras he shot down a Messerschmitt Bf 110 heavy fighter but this could not be confirmed.

On 21 May the squadron returned to England, with one flight based at Manston and making cross-channel flights to operate over the French coast. Towards the end of the month it helped provide aerial cover over the beaches at Dunkirk during the evacuation of the British Expeditionary Force (BEF). Atkinson destroyed a Messerschmitt Bf 109 southwest of Dunkirk on 27 May. He shot down a second Bf 109 the following day, this time to the southeast of the evacuation beaches. On 29 May, while flying over Nieuport, he claimed the destruction of a He 111 and a share in a damaged Junkers Ju 88 medium bomber, although the former could not be confirmed.

Once the evacuation of the BEF was completed, No. 213 Squadron was briefly based at Biggin Hill. In recognition of his successes in France, Atkinson was awarded the Distinguished Flying Cross (DFC) on 25 June; the citation, published in The London Gazette, read:

During May 1940, Pilot Officer Atkinson shot down two enemy aircraft and assisted in shooting down two others. Later, in the Dunkerque area, this officer shot down another two enemy aircraft and assisted in destroying two more. He has shown a high standard of skill and determination in attacking the enemy, frequently against vastly superior numbers.

— London Gazette, No. 34881, 25 June 1940

=== Battle of Britain ===
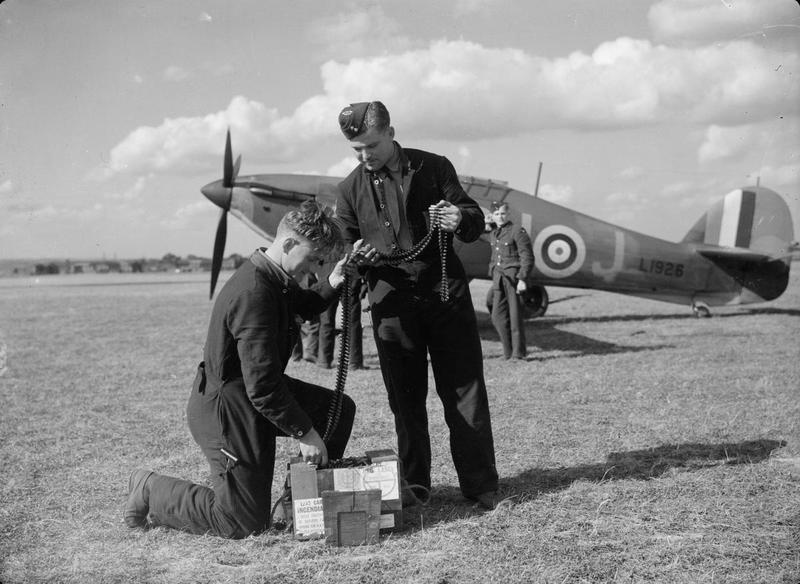
Ammunition belts being prepared for a Hawker Hurricane during the Battle of Britain

No. 213 Squadron shifted to Exeter in Devon, as part of No. 10 Group, in late June and served from here throughout the Battle of Britain on interception duties along the English Channel. On 12 August, Atkinson destroyed a pair of Bf 110s to the south of Portsmouth. He shot down a third Bf 110 the following day south of Portland, and destroyed a He 111 on 14 August, south of Lyme Regis. His Hurricane was damaged and he was lightly wounded during the latter engagement.

Atkinson quickly returned to duty despite his wounds, destroying a Bf 109 near Swanage two days later. On 18 August, on what is now known as The Hardest Day, the squadron was scrambled in the early afternoon to patrol over St Catherine's Point and possibly assist in the interception of a large Luftwaffe bombing raid that had been detected by radar. Arriving as German aircraft, having attacked the airfield at Thorney Island, retreated, Atkinson shot down a Bf 109 about 8 kilometres (5.0 mi) south of Ventnor.

On 25 August Atkinson was scrambled to intercept an incoming Luftwaffe raid over Warmwell. During the resulting engagement he was shot down and killed, his Hurricane crashing into the English Channel. His body was retrieved from the seashore three days later and was subsequently buried at Market Weighton Cemetery in Yorkshire.

At the time of his death, Atkinson was credited with having destroyed twelve aircraft, three of which were shared with other pilots. In addition to two aircraft shot down that were not confirmed, he is also credited with two damaged aircraft, one shared with another pilot.
