= William Atkinson (translator) =

English cleric and translator

William Atkinson, D.D. (died 1509), was an English cleric and translator.

== Biography ==
Atkinson was a native of the diocese of York, was M.A. and fellow of Pembroke Hall, Cambridge, in 1477, B.D. in 1485, and D.D. in 1498. He became a prebendary of Southwell in 1501, canon of Lincoln 7 March 1503–04, and canon of Windsor 25 Feb. 1506–07. He died 8 Aug. 1509, and was buried in St. George's chapel, Windsor. At the command of Margaret, countess of Richmond and Derby, mother of King Henry VII, Dr. Atkinson translated from the French three books of the Imitation of Jesus Christ attributed to Jean Gerson, but now accepted as being by Thomas à Kempis. This translation was published in 1502, and again in 1503 and 1517, under the title of "A full deuoute & gostely treatyse of ye Imytacion & folowynge ye blessyd Lyfe of our most mercifull Sauiour Cryst".
