= Jimmy Atkinson =

English footballer

Personal information
- Full name: James Atkinson
- Date of birth: 1886
- Place of birth: Manchester, England
- Height: 5 ft 10 in (1.78 m)
- Positions: Inside forward; wing half

Senior career*
Years	Team	Apps	(Gls)
- Newton Heath Athletic
190?–1905	Sale Holmefield		
1905–1908	Bolton Wanderers	3	(1)
1908–1909	Brighton & Hove Albion	32	(1)
1909–1910	Exeter City	40	(0)
1910–19??	Barrow		
- * Club domestic league appearances and goals

James Atkinson (1886 – after 1910) was an English professional footballer who played as an inside forward or wing half in the Football League for Bolton Wanderers.

== Life and career ==
Atkinson was born in 1886 in Manchester, and was playing Manchester League football for Newton Heath Athletic by the age of 15. He moved on to Sale Holmefield, had a trial with Manchester United that came to nothing, then signed for Bolton Wanderers in March 1905. He scored on his debut in the First Division a year later, but played only twice more in the league before spending the 1908–09 Southern League season as Brighton & Hove Albion's regular left half. A season with another Southern League club, Exeter City, followed, and he then joined Barrow of the Lancashire Combination.
