= Ted Atkinson (footballer) =

Australian rules footballer

Personal information
- Full name: Edward George Atkinson
- Born: 22 September 1920; Fitzroy, Victoria
- Died: 8 June 2016 (aged 95)
- Original team: Northcote
- Height: 175 cm (5 ft 9 in)
- Weight: 82 kg (181 lb)

Playing career^{1}
Years	Club	Games (Goals)
1946	North Melbourne	3 (0)
- ^{1} Playing statistics correct to the end of 1946.

Edward George Atkinson (22 September 1920 – 8 June 2016) was an Australian rules footballer who played with North Melbourne in the Victorian Football League (VFL).

== Personal life ==
Anderson served as a corporal in the Australian Army during the Second World War.
