= Peter Atkinson =

Peter Atkinson may refer to:

== Architects ==
- Peter Atkinson (architect, born 1735) (1735–1805), English architect
- Peter Atkinson (architect, baptised 1780) (1780–1843), English architect, son of the above

== Religious figures ==
- Peter Atkinson (Archdeacon of Surrey) (1829–1888), 19th century Archdeacon of Surrey
- Peter Atkinson (priest) (born 1952), Dean of Worcester

== Others ==
- Peter Atkinson (cricketer) (born 1949), English cricketer
- Peter Atkinson (hurler), Irish hurler
- Peter Atkinson (politician) (born 1943), British politician
