= John Atkinson (footballer, born 1884) =

Scottish footballer (1884–1914)

Personal information
- Full name: John Atkinson
- Date of birth: 5 December 1884
- Place of birth: Cambuslang, Scotland
- Date of death: 26 November 1914 (aged 29)
- Place of death: Atlantic Ocean
- Position: Outside left

Senior career*
Years	Team	Apps	(Gls)
- Earnock Rovers
–1903	Port Glasgow Athletic Juniors		
1903–1910	Hamilton Academical	97	(27)
1904	→ Queen's Park (loan)	4	(1)
1909	→ Celtic (loan)	1	(2)
1910	→ Partick Thistle (loan)	4	(1)
- * Club domestic league appearances and goals

John Atkinson (5 December 1884 – 26 November 1914) was a Scottish amateur footballer who played in the Scottish League for Hamilton Academical, Queen's Park, Celtic and Partick Thistle as an outside left.

== Personal life ==
Atkinson was a medical student and later qualified as a doctor, moving to County Durham to practice. After the outbreak of the First World War in August 1914, he moved to work in Madagascar. He died in the Atlantic Ocean, off the west coast of Africa, in an accident on 26 November 1914.

== Career statistics ==
Appearances and goals by club, season and competition
Club	Season	League			Scottish Cup		Other		Total	
Club	Season	Division	Apps	Goals	Apps	Goals	Apps	Goals	Apps	Goals
Hamilton Academical	1904–05	Scottish Second Division	0	0	0	0	3 (Note: Appearances in Lanarkshire Cup)	0	3	0
Hamilton Academical	1905–06	Scottish Second Division	17	10	3	1	7 (Note: 3 appearances and 1 goal in Lanarkshire Cup, 2 appearances and 1 goal in Larkhall Charity Cup, 2 appearances in Scottish Qualifying Cup)	2	25	13
Hamilton Academical	1906–07	Scottish First Division	24	4	0	0	1 (Note: Appearance in Scottish Qualifying Cup)	0	25	4
Hamilton Academical	1907–08	Scottish First Division	32	9	1	0	6 (Note: 2 appearances and 2 goals in Scottish Qualifying Cup, 1 appearance in Lanarkshire Cup, 2 appearances in Larkhall Charity Cup)	2	39	11
Hamilton Academical	1908–09	Scottish First Division	3	0	0	0	0	0	3	0
Hamilton Academical	1909–10	Scottish First Division	21	4	2	0	0	0	23	4
Hamilton Academical	Total		97	27	6	1	17	4	120	32
Queen's Park (loan)	1904–05	Scottish First Division	4	1	—		—		4	1
Celtic (loan)	1908–09	Scottish First Division	1	2	—		—		1	2
Partick Thistle (loan)	1909–10	Scottish First Division	4	1	—		—		4	1
Career total			106	31	6	1	17	4	129	36

== Honours ==
Hamilton Academical

- Lanarkshire Cup: 1904–05, 1905–06
