= James Atkinson (theologian) =

The Reverend James Atkinson
- Born: 27 April 1914; Tynemouth, England
- Died: 30 July 2011 (aged 97)
- Spouse: Laura Nutley (m. 1939; died 1967)

Academic background
- Education: St John's College, Durham; University of Münster
- Thesis: Luther and St. John's Gospel (1955)
- Doctoral advisor: Robert Stupperich
- Other advisor: Michael Ramsey

Academic work
- Discipline: Biblical studies; history; theology
- Sub-discipline: Biblical theology; ecclesiastical history; historical theology
- Institutions: University of Hull; University of Sheffield
- Main interests: Martin Luther; Reformation

Ecclesiastical career
- Religion: Christianity (Anglican)
- Church: Church of England
- Ordained: 1937 (deacon); 1938 (priest)
- Offices held: Canon Theologian of Leicester Cathedral (1954–1970); Canon Theologian of Sheffield Cathedral (1970–1993)

James Atkinson (27 April 1914 – 30 July 2011) was an English Anglican priest, biblical scholar, and theologian specialising in Martin Luther and the Protestant Reformation. He was Professor of Biblical Studies at the University of Sheffield from 1967 to 1979, Canon Theologian of Sheffield Cathedral from 1970 to 1993, and Director of the Centre for Reformation Studies in Sheffield from 1983 to 2006.

== Early life ==
Atkinson was born on 27 April 1914 in Tynemouth, Northumberland. He was the eldest of three sons born to Nicholas Ridley Atkinson, a civil engineer with the Tynemouth Improvement Commission, and his wife Margaret. He was educated at Tynemouth High School. He then went to St John's College, Durham, where he studied theology. He became captain of boats at the college's boat club.

One of his brothers was Sir Robert Atkinson, a decorated Royal Navy officer and businessman. The other brother died during the Second World War, in March 1943, when the merchant ship on which he was serving was torpedoed and sank.

== Ecclesiastical career ==
Atkinson was ordained a deacon in the Church of England in 1937 and a priest in 1938. He was a curate at Holy Cross Church, Fenham, Newcastle, from 1937 to 1941. He continued his studies at the University of Durham and completed a Master of Arts (MA) degree in 1939. In 1941, he joined the clergy of Sheffield Cathedral. He was succentor for one year, before serving as precentor from 1942 to 1944.

He died on 30 July 2011.

== Works ==
- Atkinson, James, ed. (1962). Luther: Early Theological Works. London: SCM Press.
- Atkinson, James, ed. (1966). Luther's Works: The Christian in Society I. Philadelphia: Fortress Press. ISBN 0800603443.
- Atkinson, James (1968). Martin Luther and the Birth of Protestantism. London: Pelican.
- Atkinson, James (1968). The Great Light. Exeter, England: Paternoster.
- Atkinson, James, ed. (1987). Daily Readings with Martin Luther. Springfield, Illinois: Templegate Publishers. ISBN 0872431576.

Academic offices
Preceded by I. Howard Marshall	Didsbury Lecturer; 1981	Succeeded by Thomas F. Torrance
Professional and academic associations
Preceded by Allan Galloway	President of the Society for the Study of Theology; 1979–1980	Succeeded by Donald M. MacKinnon
