= Henry Dresser Atkinson =

Australian clergyman and naturalist

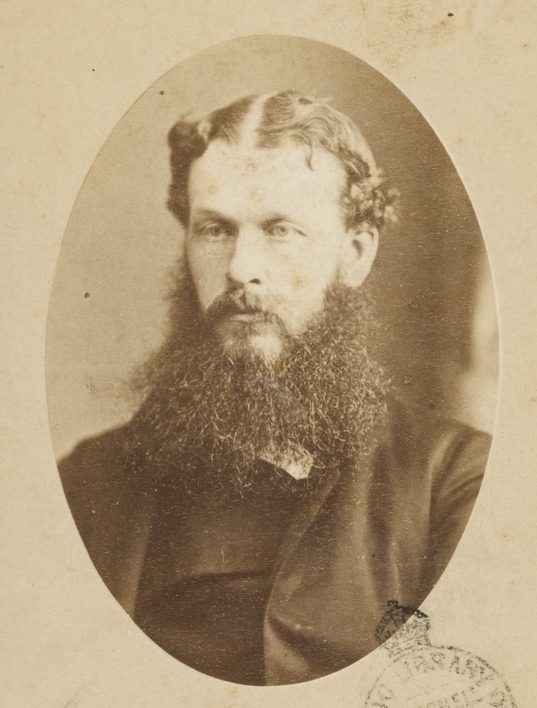
Rev. H. D. Atkinson

Henry Dresser Atkinson (1841–1921, fl. 1860–1890) was an Australian clergyman and amateur naturalist, active in Tasmania around the late nineteenth century.

Atkinson lived at Stanley and Evandale, Tasmania, and made collections of specimens around Circular Head. Atkinson was born in Selby, Yorkshire, England, to Reverend Henry Atkinson, Vicar of Barmby and headmaster at the Read School, Drax. He entered Magdalene College, Cambridge, in 1860, and graduated in 1863. His brother Edwin Dresser Atkinson became a geologist and fossil collector. He was the father of Henry Brune Atkinson (1874–1960), also a clergyman with an interest in natural history, who was borne by his wife Sarah Ann, née Ward, and said to have been wet nursed by Truganini. He produced a short book titled Jottings of Tasmanian bird-life (1888?), which contained commentary from W. V. Legge; the date of the book is inferred from a reference within the text to the earlier work of Philip Sclater.

Atkinson served on the biological consultation committee of the Australasian Association for the Advancement of Science, his works included leading the contributions to the sixth report of the committee, a "List of Vernacular Names for Australian Birds" in 1898. He was elected a Fellow of the Royal Society of Tasmania in 1870. Known as a collector of molluscs, he furnished many shells to Julian Tenison-Woods, who named the species Scissurella atkinsoni after him. He died in Hobart on 26 June 1921, aged 80, and was buried in Cornelian Bay Cemetery.
