= Harry Atkinson (cricketer) =

English cricketer

Harry Atkinson (1 February 1881 – 22 December 1959) was an English cricketer, who played one game of first-class cricket for Yorkshire in 1907. Although almost uniquely undistinguished in bald statistical terms, Atkinson's career had the merit of brevity at least. He is one of the few cricketers in the history of cricket to make a pair in his only first-class appearance. His lack of success makes him notable in the long annals of the game.

Atkinson was born in Hull. His only appearance in the first-class game came against Worcestershire in August 1907 at Bradford's Park Avenue Cricket Ground. Thanks for a half century from G. N. Foster the visitors compiled 155, with Newstead taking 4 for 62, but Atkinson went for 17 runs in three overs. Yorkshire were then routed for 62 in 24.5 overs, Atkinson's duck coming at number 9, courtesy of a catch by Burns from the bowling of Cuffe, who took 4 for 38 in partnership with Arnold (6 for 22). Yorkshire then staged a fightback, bowling Worcestershire out for 28 in 16.2 overs. Newstead was the principal destroyer, taking 7 wickets for just 10 runs. Yorkshire ended the game all out for 91, to lose by thirty runs. Atkinson was stumped by Straw off Cuffe for nought.

Atkinson played for the East Riding of Yorkshire in 1919.
