= James Atkinson (doctor) =

English mayor of Crewe

James Atkinson (1838–1917) was a doctor and the first mayor of Crewe, England.
