= Arthur Atkinson =

Arthur Atkinson may refer to:

- Arthur Atkinson (character), fictional character on the TV show The Fast Show
- Arthur Atkinson (footballer) (1909–1983), British football player for Hull City, Lincoln City, Mansfield Town
- Arthur Atkinson (politician, born 1833) (1833–1902), New Zealand politician representing Omata
- Arthur Atkinson (politician, born 1863) (1863–1935), New Zealand politician representing City of Wellington
- Arthur Atkinson (rugby league) (1906–1963), English rugby league footballer of the 1920s, 1930s and 1940s for Great Britain, England, Yorkshire, and Castleford
- Arthur Atkinson (speedway rider) (1911–1993), English motorcycle speedway rider for the West Ham Hammers
- Arthur K. Atkinson (1892–1964), American railway president
