= Isabel Atkinson =

English born Canadian women's rights activist/sociologist/philanthropist

Isabel Atkinson (1891–1968) was an English born Canadian women's rights activist, sociologist and philanthropist who became president of the Consumers' Association of Canada.

== Biography ==
Atkinson was born in Bramley, England on July 22, 1891. After her father's death, she emigrated with her mother and brother to Waterbury, Connecticut in the United States. Aged 14, she worked in a factory, and the conditions there propelled her to campaign for women's rights. In 1914 she moved to Saskatchewan to live on her brother's farm in Strasbourg, working as a farm hand and in 1919 she relocated to Kerrobert, Saskatchewan, where she lived for some 25 years with her mother. Working as a librarian over this time she acquired an avid interest in social studies, particularly concerned with housing for the poor and the condition of public health. Four years after her mother's death she moved to Saskatoon, where she was able to publish her social concerns, in newspapers such as the Star-Phoenix and the Winnipeg Free Press which went on to print her extracts in pamphlets.

In 1954, there in Saskatoon she became the Saskatchewan president of the Consumers' Association of Canada (CAC), later becoming the Canadian leader from 1956 to 1960.

In the 1960s, she continued to research into social issues and was active in the Saskatoon Council of Women before her death on August 11, 1968.
