= Tom Atkinson =

English cricketer (1930–1990)

Personal information
- Full name: Thomas Atkinson
- Born: 27 September 1930; Millom, Cumberland
- Died: 2 September 1990 (aged 59); Glasgow
- Batting: Right-handed
- Bowling: Right-arm fast-medium
- Role: Bowler

Domestic team information
- Years: Team
- 1955: Cumberland
- 1957–1960: Nottinghamshire
- 1961–1964: Cumberland
- FC debut: 25 May 1957 Notts v West Indians
- Last FC: 31 August 1960 Notts v Glamorgan

Career statistics
Competition	First-class
Matches	64
Runs scored	1,127
Batting average	13.25
100s/50s	0/0
Top score	48
Balls bowled	10,162
Wickets	116
Bowling average	44.45
5 wickets in innings	2
10 wickets in match	1
Best bowling	6/61
Catches/stumpings	30/–
- Source: CricketArchive, 1 March 2024

Thomas Atkinson (27 September 1930 – 2 September 1990) was an English first-class cricketer who played for Nottinghamshire County Cricket Club between 1957 and 1960. He later played as a professional in Scotland and worked as a groundsman for the West of Scotland Cricket Club.

Atkinson was born at Millom in Cumberland in 1930. He is known to have played club cricket in nearby Haverigg from 1948 and first played for Cumberland County Cricket Club in 1952. He went on to play regularly for the county in the Minor Counties Championship in 1955 and between 1961 and 1964, making 25 Championship appearances for the side. Described by Wisden as a "right-arm medium-pace bowler and a useful batsman in the lower order", Atkinson was employed as a member of the ground staff at Trent Bridge in April 1956 after having impressed at a trial. He made his senior debut for Nottinghamshire in May the following season against the touring West Indians, although he did not take a wicket in the match. Initially employed on a three-year contract alongside a number of other young professionals, he took one wicket on his County Championship debut against Sussex at Worthing, and made two further appearances during the season.

Most of Atkinson's 64 first-class matches were played in the three seasons between 1958 and 1960. His 23 wickets taken in 1958 were expensive and he was the lowest ranked bowler in the annual bowling averages table. He remained expensive the following season―he took 38 wickets at an average of 46.42 runs per wicket―but "batted profitably", scoring 348 runs and took his first five-wicket haul, taking five wickets for 91 runs (5/91) against Somerset at Taunton. His final season with Nottinghamshire was his best: in 1960 he took 53 wickets at an average of 36.62, including ten wickets in a match against Derbyshire at Ilkeston, four in the first innings and a career best six for 61 in the second; he also scored 467 runs, according to Wisden "often scoring usefully when others failed".

The 1960 season was Atkinson's last in first-class cricket. Although Wisden reported in his obituary that he was "not retained" by the club, Nottinghamshire's biography of him says that he declined a new contract which was offered to him, deciding instead to take up the offer of employment as a professional at the West of Scotland Cricket Club in Glasgow. After five seasons in Glasgow he moved as professional to Uddingston Cricket Club, south-east of Glasgow, before returning to the West of Scotland Club in 1975 to work as the groundsman at the club's Hamilton Crescent ground.

In total, Atkinson took 116 wickets in first-class matches for Nottinghamshire, at an average of 44.45. He scored 1,127 runs with his highest score of 48 runs coming against Hampshire in 1958. He died at Glasgow in 1990 after having suffered a heart attack. He was aged 59.
