= Thomas Lewis Atkinson =

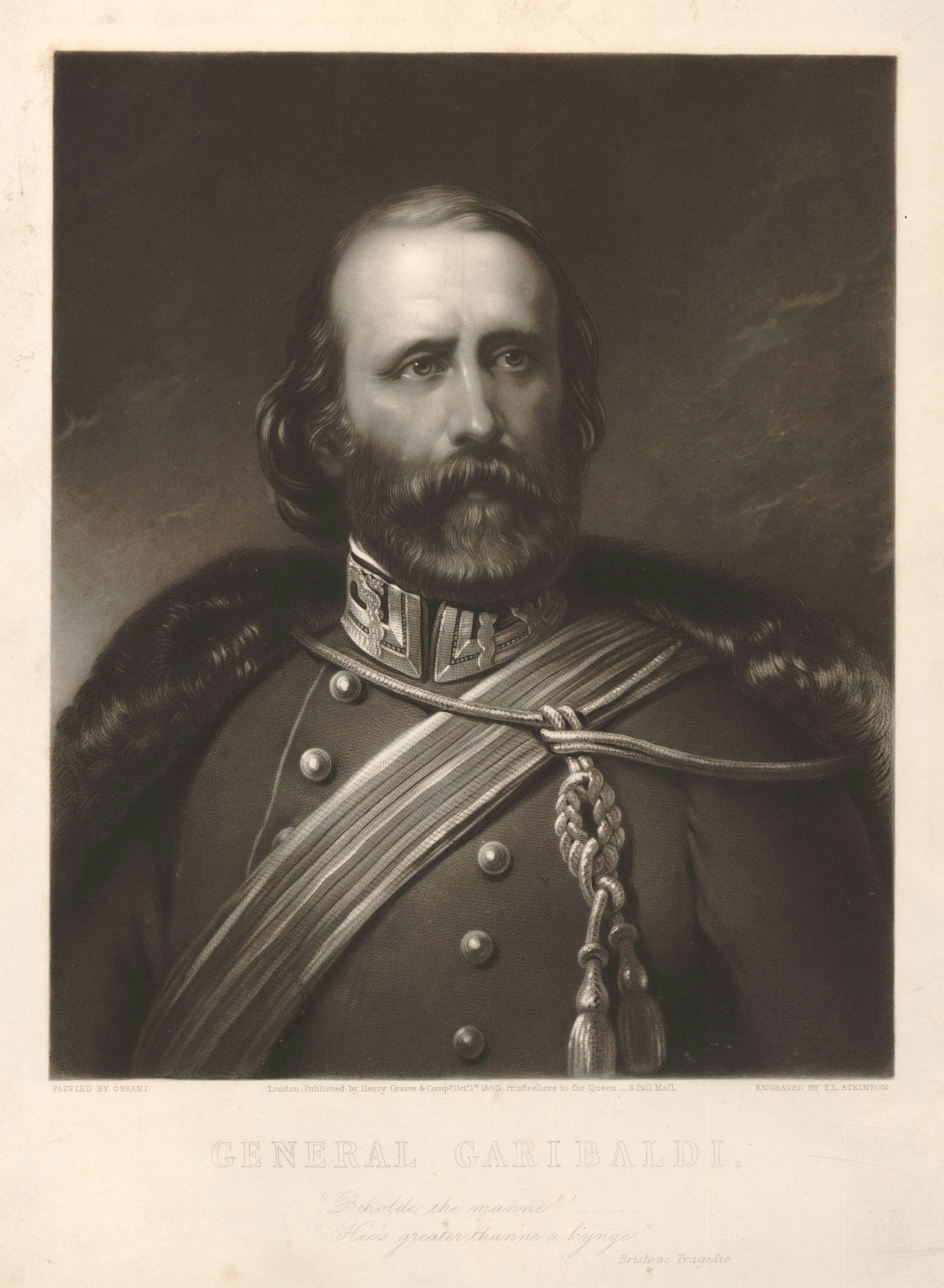
Thomas Lewis Atkinson, Portrait of Giuseppe Garibaldi, 1860. Mezzotint after a painting by Alessandro Ossani.

Thomas Lewis Atkinson (4 April 1817 in Salisbury – 1898) was a British reproductive engraver.
