= William J. Atkinson =

American scientist

- Born: about 1950
- Education: Samford University
- Scientific career
- Fields: Nuclear and space radiation hardening and electro-optics

William J. Atkinson (born about 1950), an American, is a senior scientist at Boeing Satellite Systems who was named a Fellow of the American Physical Society in 2011. An expert in nuclear and space radiation hardening and electro-optics, he was cited for "academic contributions in the areas of nuclear physics and for substantial applications of radiation technology to spaceborne applications in the aerospace community." In 2011, he was also honored as an Associate Fellow of the American Institute of Aeronautics and Astronautics.

IEEE Spectrum reported Atkinson "developed software known as TSAREME (short for Total Space and Atmospheric Radiation Effects on Microelectronics) to account for errors induced by the impact of radiation in near-Earth orbits and inside the atmosphere."

== Selected publications ==
- Atkinson, William J.; Brezovich, Ivan A. (November 22, 2006). "An analytic solution from a spherical gamma emitter". American Journal of Physics. 74 (12): 1112–1114. Bibcode:2006AmJPh..74.1112A. doi:10.1119/1.2348891. ISSN 0002-9505.
- Atkinson, William J.; Seidler, William A. (2007). "Impact of device scaling and material composition on the soft error rates in avionic systems". Proceedings 2007 IEEE SoutheastCon. pp. 601–605. doi:10.1109/SECON.2007.342973. ISBN 978-1-4244-1028-6. S2CID 6477109.
- Atkinson, William J. (September 14, 2007). "Analytic solution for source distributions in brachytherapy to obtain uniform dose rates in spherical tumor models". Physics in Medicine & Biology. 52 (19): 5871–5879. Bibcode:2007PMB....52.5871A. doi:10.1088/0031-9155/52/19/009. PMID 17881805. S2CID 1801951.
- Atkinson, William J.; Hansen, David; Sunderland, David A.; Seidler, William A. (2008). "TSAREME, a comprehensive tool in evaluating radiation hardness of submicron technologies". IEEE SoutheastCon 2008. pp. 409–414. doi:10.1109/SECON.2008.4494329. ISBN 978-1-4244-1883-1. S2CID 34400265.
- Matzkind, Courtney; Seidler, William A.; Atkinson, William J. (July 12, 2009). "Disturbance of Electronics in Low-Earth Orbits by High Energy Electron Plasmas". SAE International Journal of Aerospace. 4 (1): 8–13. doi:10.4271/2009-01-2339. ISSN 1946-3855.
- Atkinson, William; Seidler, William; Matzkind, Courtney (2010), "Model Results on the Radiation-Hardness of Submicron Electronics in Aeronautical Systems", U.S. Air Force T&E Days 2010, American Institute of Aeronautics and Astronautics, doi:10.2514/6.2010-1724, ISBN 978-1-60086-965-5, S2CID 110639752
- Atkinson, William; Collaboration, William J. Atkinson (2015). "Models for Examining Impact of Cosmic Rays on Integrated Circuits". APS. 2015: L1.037. Bibcode:2015APS..APR.L1037A.
- Atkinson, William J. (November 8, 2018). "Impact of Space radiation on Ultra-Sensitive In-Orbit IR Telescopes". Bulletin of the American Physical Society. 63 (19). American Physical Society.
