= John Atkinson (Australian footballer) =

Australian rules footballer (1948–2022)

Personal information
- Full name: John Atkinson
- Born: 3 April 1948
- Died: 7 September 2022 (aged 74)
- Original team: Northcote Park
- Height: 177 cm (5 ft 10 in)
- Weight: 73 kg (161 lb)

Playing career^{1}
Years	Club	Games (Goals)
1968	Fitzroy	3 (1)
- ^{1} Playing statistics correct to the end of 1968.

John Atkinson (3 April 1948 – 7 September 2022) was an Australian rules footballer who played with Fitzroy in the Victorian Football League (VFL).
