= Bill Atkinson (footballer, born 1944) =

English footballer

Personal information
- Full name: William Atkinson
- Date of birth: 21 December 1944
- Place of birth: Sunderland, England
- Date of death: 24 June 2013 (aged 68)
- Place of death: Nuneaton, England
- Position: Right winger

Senior career*
Years	Team	Apps	(Gls)
1962–1964	Birmingham City	0	(0)
1964–1965	Torquay United	19	(7)
1965–1966	Nuneaton Borough	17	(3)
- * Club domestic league appearances and goals

William Atkinson (21 December 1944 – 24 June 2013) was an English professional footballer who played on the right wing. He played in the Football League for Torquay United, was on the books of Birmingham City without appearing for their first team, and played non-league football for Nuneaton Borough.

Atkinson began his professional football career as an apprentice at Birmingham City, turning professional in March 1962. He remained at St Andrew's for a further two years, but failed to make a single first team appearance.

In June 1964 he moved to Torquay United, scoring on his league debut on 12 September 1964 in a 2–2 draw against Stockport County at Plainmoor. Despite this start to his Torquay career he was soon out of the team again, although did have a good run in the first team later in the season after replacing Peter Anderson in the side.

In 1966, after only 19 league appearances, in which he scored 7 goals, Atkinson returned to the Midlands, joining non-league side Nuneaton Borough. He retired from Non League Football in 1974 – the last Club he played for was Redditch.

Atkinson started refereeing throughout the Midlands in 1982 for local clubs, also involved with assessing for the B.C.F.A. of which he was a member for 20 years.

For 20 years, during summer months he played cricket for local club Ambleside and Ansley, and later umpired for local clubs in the Midlands area.

Atkinson started a successful family run industrial cleaning business in 1968, which he ran with his son James.
