= William Stephen Atkinson =

William Stephen Atkinson (September 1820 – 15 January 1876, Rome) was a British lepidopterist who worked for much of his life in India.

William was the eldest son of Rev. Thomas D. Atkinson, of Chesterton, in Suffolk. He became interested in nature at Cannock Chase, when his father became Vicar of Rugeley. He started collecting British Lepidoptera. He went to Trinity College, Cambridge, from 1839 and passed out as 26th wrangler in 1843. He then studied to become a civil engineer, but was offered the position of principal at Martiniere College and went to Calcutta (now Kolkata) in November 1854. He was married to Miss Montford daughter of the Vicar of East Winch.

In Calcutta he joined The Asiatic Society and later became its secretary. He became interested in the Lepidoptera of Bengal and started breeding moths and communicated with Henry Tibbats Stainton. In 1857 he became a member of the Entomological Society. In 1860 he became Director of Public Instruction in Bengal and made visits to Darjeeling where he made extensive collections. He made trips to Sikkim with Dr Thomas Anderson of the Calcutta Botanic Garden. In 1865 he became a trustee of the New Indian Museum. He was in correspondence with Frederic Moore.

Atkinson lived for many years in Calcutta collecting and painting pictures of specimens. His collection was purchased on his death by William Chapman Hewitson and deposited with the Natural History Museum in London. Frederic Moore and Hewitson described and published many of the new species collected by him.
