= William Verner =

William Verner may refer to:

- Frank Verner (William Franklyn Verner, 1883–1966), athlete
- Sir William Verner, 1st Baronet (1782–1871), British soldier and politician
- Sir William Verner, 2nd Baronet (1822–1873), British soldier and politician
- Sir William Verner, 3rd Baronet (1855–1886), British baronet
- Willoughby Verner (William Willoughby Cole Verner, 1852–1922), British ornithologist
