= Barry baronets =

Set index for Barry baronets

There have been two baronetcies created for persons with the surname Barry, one in the Baronetage of Ireland and one in the Baronetage of the United Kingdom. As of 2026 the latter is extant.

- Barry baronets of the City of Dublin (1775)
- Barry baronets of St Leonard's Hill and Keiss Castle (1899)
