= Sir James Stronge, 3rd Baronet =

Sir James Matthew Stronge Bt DL JP
- Predecessor: Sir James Matthew Stronge, 2nd Baronet
- Successor: Sir John Calvert Stronge, 4th Baronet
- Born: James Matthew Stronge; 4 April 1822
- Died: 10 January 1873 (aged 50)
- Spouse: Mary Pakenham
- Father: Sir William Verner, 1st Baronet
- Mother: Harriet Wingfield

Arms of the Stronge Baronets, of Tynan

Sir James Matthew Stronge, 3rd Baronet DL, JP (25 November 1811 – 11 March 1885), succeeded to the baronetcy on the death of his 78-year-old father, Sir James Stronge 2nd baronet, on 2 December 1864. He was a member of the Stronge family and was born in Tynan Abbey, County Armagh. His mother was Isabella Calvert, Lady Stronge, the eldest daughter of Nicholas Calvert M.P., of Hunsdon House, Hertfordshire, and his wife The Hon. Frances Pery, daughter of the Viscount Pery (a Speaker of the Irish House of Commons).

Stronge married, on 17 June 1836, Selina Nugent, daughter of Andrew Nugent of Portaferry, County Down and a niece of John, 3rd Viscount de Vesci. He served as High Sheriff of Armagh for 1843 and High Sheriff of Tyrone for 1844 and deputy lieutenant of County Armagh in 1844 and of County Tyrone in 1845. Stronge was also a Member of Parliament for County Armagh in 1864 and a justice of the peace.

He was commissioned as a Lieutenant in the 21st Foot and served in the 59th Foot, and 5th Dragoon Guards. After retirement from the Regular Army he was appointed Lieutenant-Colonel Commandant of the Royal Tyrone Fusiliers Militia and from 22 April 1862 was Honorary Colonel of the regiment, which became the 4th (Royal Tyrone Militia) Battalion, Royal Inniskilling Fusiliers.

In about 1840, Stronge was responsible for the establishment of the Tynan Harriers, a hunting group, which were regarded as a capable pack.

He died without issue and was succeeded to the baronetcy by his brother, Sir John Stronge.

Parliament of the United Kingdom
Preceded by Maxwell Charles Close; Sir William Verner, 1st Bt	Member of Parliament for County Armagh; 1864 – 1873; With: Sir William Verner, 1st Bt 1864–1868; Sir William Verner, 2nd Bt 1868–1873; Edward Wingfield Verner 1873–1873	Succeeded by Edward Wingfield Verner; Maxwell Charles Close
Baronetage of the United Kingdom
Preceded by James Stronge	Baronet (of Tynan); 1864–1885	Succeeded by John Stronge
