= British ambulances in the Franco-Prussian War =

Humanitarian aid provided by the UK to both sides

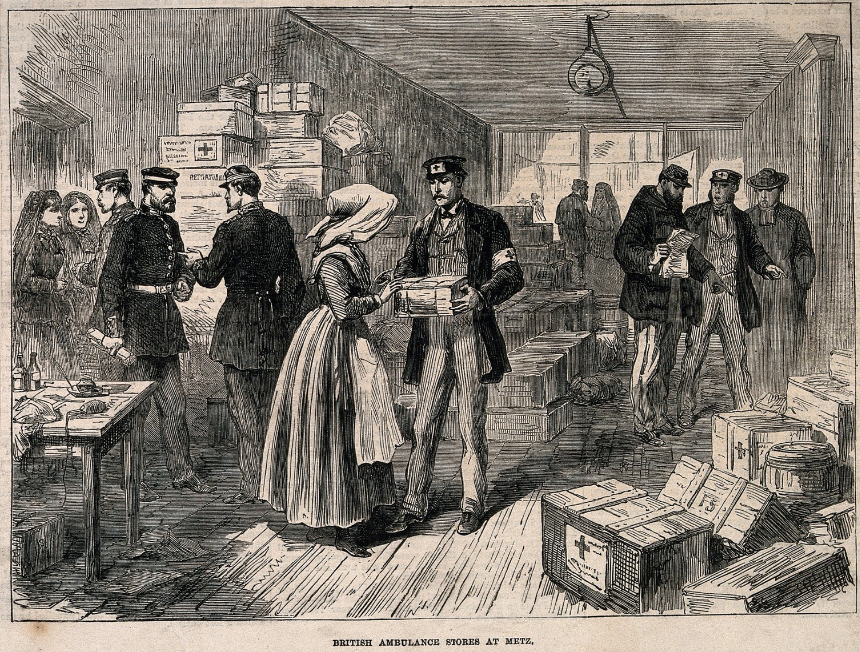
British ambulance stores at Metz during the war

Though the United Kingdom remained neutral during the Franco-Prussian War of 1870–71, it provided ambulances and other medical assistance to both combatants and the civilians affected by the war. The term "ambulance" at this time denoted a medical organisation that provided field hospitals, transport and surgical operations, not the more limited modern use. The British public donated more than £300,000 to provide medical assistance during the war. The ambulances, together with those of other neutral organisations, proved very effective at treating casualties, and following the war all major powers took steps to implement similar arrangements for future wars.

== Background ==
The United Kingdom was neutral during the Franco-Prussian War, but numerous organisations were formed to provide medical assistance to one side or both during the war. More than £300,000 of donations was made by the British public to provide for medical services during the course of the war. Much of the funding went to "ambulances", a term that at the time referred to an organisation providing large-scale medical facilities including transport, field hospitals and surgical facilities rather than the more limited usage of today. Many of the ambulances were staffed by doctors on leave from the British Army with medical students from other nations serving on an ad-hoc basis.

A number of other neutral nations formed their own ambulances to provide medical assistance during the war including the Netherlands, Italy, Austria and Belgium. By the war's end, it had become clear that ambulances and formal medical provision were a key requirement of warfare of the time. All of the major powers subsequently made efforts to establish permanent organised ambulance services for the transport and treatment of their wounded during wartime.

== Individual ambulances ==
=== Ambulance Anglaise ===
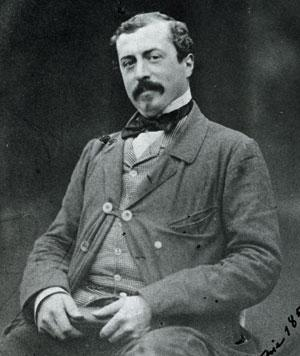
Richard Wallace pictured in 1857

A prominent British resident of Paris, Richard Wallace contributed funds to establish two ambulances during the siege: one for French wounded and one for "sick and destitute" British citizens. He also contributed more than £12,000 of funding for the ambulances as part of the 2.5 million francs he gave to relieve suffering in Paris during the war. Despite having the opportunity to flee, Wallace chose to remain in the city throughout the war. The ambulances, staffed by English surgeons, became known as the Ambulance Anglaise ("English Ambulance"), though Wallace named the field portion of the unit after his father, the Marquess of Hertford. The unit provided a hospital of 50 beds in the city and absorbed some of the staff of the American Ambulance after it was disbanded in March.

After the war, Wallace's ambulances were absorbed into the Hertford British Hospital, established in Paris by Wallace on 15 October 1871. As a result of his work, Wallace was said to be the most popular British resident of the city. He was honoured by having a street named for him and received the Legion of Honour from France and a baronetcy from Queen Victoria.

=== Anglo-American Ambulance ===
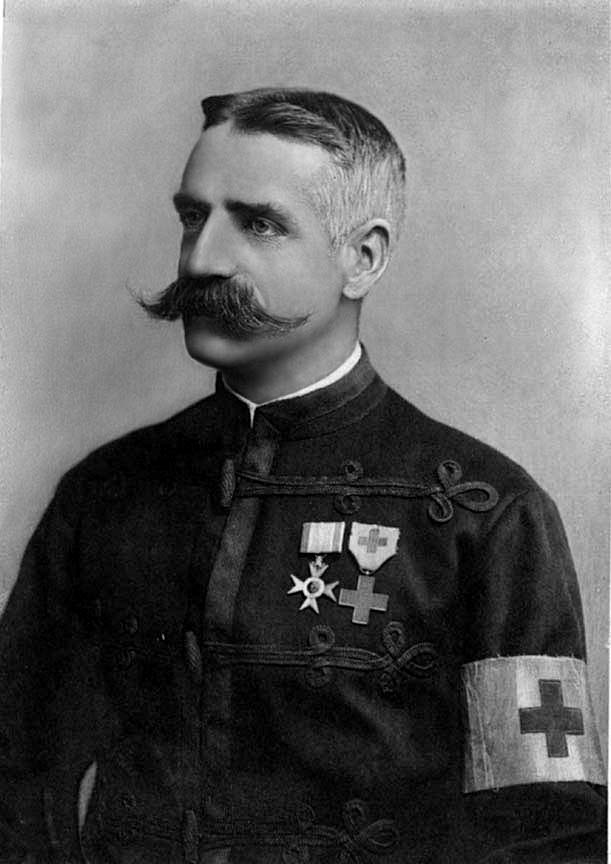
Charles E. Ryan in the uniform of the Anglo-American Ambulance of 1870–71

The Anglo-American Ambulance was formed as a splinter of the American Ambulance, following a dispute between medical staff and the ambulance committee over deployments (the committee wanted to wait for the siege to begin whereas the doctors wanted to immediately head to the front). The Anglo-American Ambulance was led by Confederate American Civil War veteran J. Marion Sims, who was then resident in France, and British surgeon William MacCormac. The new ambulance was partially funded by the British Society for Aid to the Sick and Wounded in War and consisted of 8 American and 8 English medical staff with three ambulance wagons. All bar one of the Americans were former Confederate Army surgeons.

Charles E. Ryan served with the corps as a dresser and assistant surgeon and in 1896 published an account of his time with the unit. The unit left Paris on 28 August by train for the battlefield of Carignan but was delayed as Prussian forces had captured the railway line. The ambulance was held at Sedan railway station where its personnel encountered the French Emperor Napoleon III and the retreating survivors of the Battle of Beaumont. The ambulance attempted to move towards the front by road but found it was caught between the two armies and returned to Sedan. Twelve men of the ambulance treated more than 600 wounded of the subsequent Battle of Sedan (1–2 September) from a hospital that periodically came under shellfire. The remaining four medical staff ran a secondary hospital at Balan which treated the wounded of a battle fought there on 31 August and those of the 1 September Battle of Bazeilles. With the ambulance at Sedan was Marcus Beck who reported that the French army surgeons had not adopted the anti-septic measures advocated by his father's cousin Joseph Lister.

Following the French defeat, the ambulance was re-united at Sedan under Prussian occupation and erected 36 tents to accommodate the large number of wounded from the recent battles and those given to their care by the Prussian forces. The ambulance was granted permission to leave Sedan for Paris on 4 October and travelled via Belgium and Rouen. However, it proved impossible to enter the capital due to the ongoing siege and instead the unit was placed at the disposal of the Prussian Army at Versailles by Robert Loyd-Lindsay of the British National Society for Aid to the Sick and Wounded in War. At around this time the ambulance changed its previously French-inspired uniform for that of the British Army's Royal Artillery undress uniform.

The ambulance arrived at the city of Orléans on 20 October, travelling through the scene of the First Battle of Orléans which was fought on 10 October. The ambulance was ordered to take over the running of a 150-bed hospital in the railway station and to be ready to take to the field as necessary. The Prussians evacuated the city on the night of 8 November and left all of the wounded there in the care of the ambulance. The unit sent a field unit to the 9 November Battle of Coulmiers where the Prussians were defeated. Orléans subsequently came into French control and they cleared the ambulance from the railway station and moved it into overcrowded private houses.

An engagement occurred at nearby Neuville on 24 November and the ambulance sent men into the field to tend to the wounded of this and subsequent skirmishes of 25 and 26 November. The ambulance managed to secure space for a 300-bed hospital at the Church of St. Euverte. The Prussians commenced the Second Battle of Orléans on 3 December and large numbers of wounded were soon brought back to the ambulance. A field unit was sent out on 4 December but the speed of the French retreat meant that a field hospital could not be established. Prussian forces retook Orléans on the night of 4 December, bringing the ambulance under their orders once again. A mobile unit was provided for the Battle of Beaugency on 7 December and returned to the city on 10 December with wagons loaded with wounded men. A number of the ambulance's men were arrested by the Prussian authorities on suspicion of espionage whilst procuring medical supplies at Étampes but were shortly thereafter released. The ambulance remained in Orléans until the armistice was signed and disbanded in early March with its equipment being handed over to the French in Paris.

The Anglo-American Ambulance has been described as a key means of exchanging medical best practice between the volunteers and the French and Prussian surgeons they worked with. In addition to spreading the word of Lister's pioneering work on antiseptics and widening the use of chloroform and morphine on the battlefield the ambulance helped to popularise a standardised method of treating bullet wounds which was based on Surgeon-General Sir Thomas Longmore's 1863 work with Minié rifle bullet wounds. MacCormac claimed that the adoption of this method was the primary reason for the low mortality rates achieved by the ambulance.

=== British Ambulance Corps ===
The British Ambulance Corps was raised to serve with the Prussian forces, but also cared for captured French wounded during the Siege of Paris of September 1870 to January 1871. The unit's B Division was commanded by Surgeon William Manley VC, a British Army veteran of the Crimean and New Zealand Wars, and was attached to the Prussian Army's 22nd Division. The B Division tended to the wounded of the battles of Orléans (3–4 December), Cravant (10 December), Chateauneuf (18 December) and Bretoncelle (21 December). Manley was awarded the Iron Cross 2nd Class for his actions during the war, on the recommendation of Frederick, Crown Prince of Prussia who commanded the III Army (to which the 22nd Division belonged). He is the only man to receive both the Victoria Cross and the Iron Cross.

=== British National Society for Aid to the Sick and Wounded in War ===
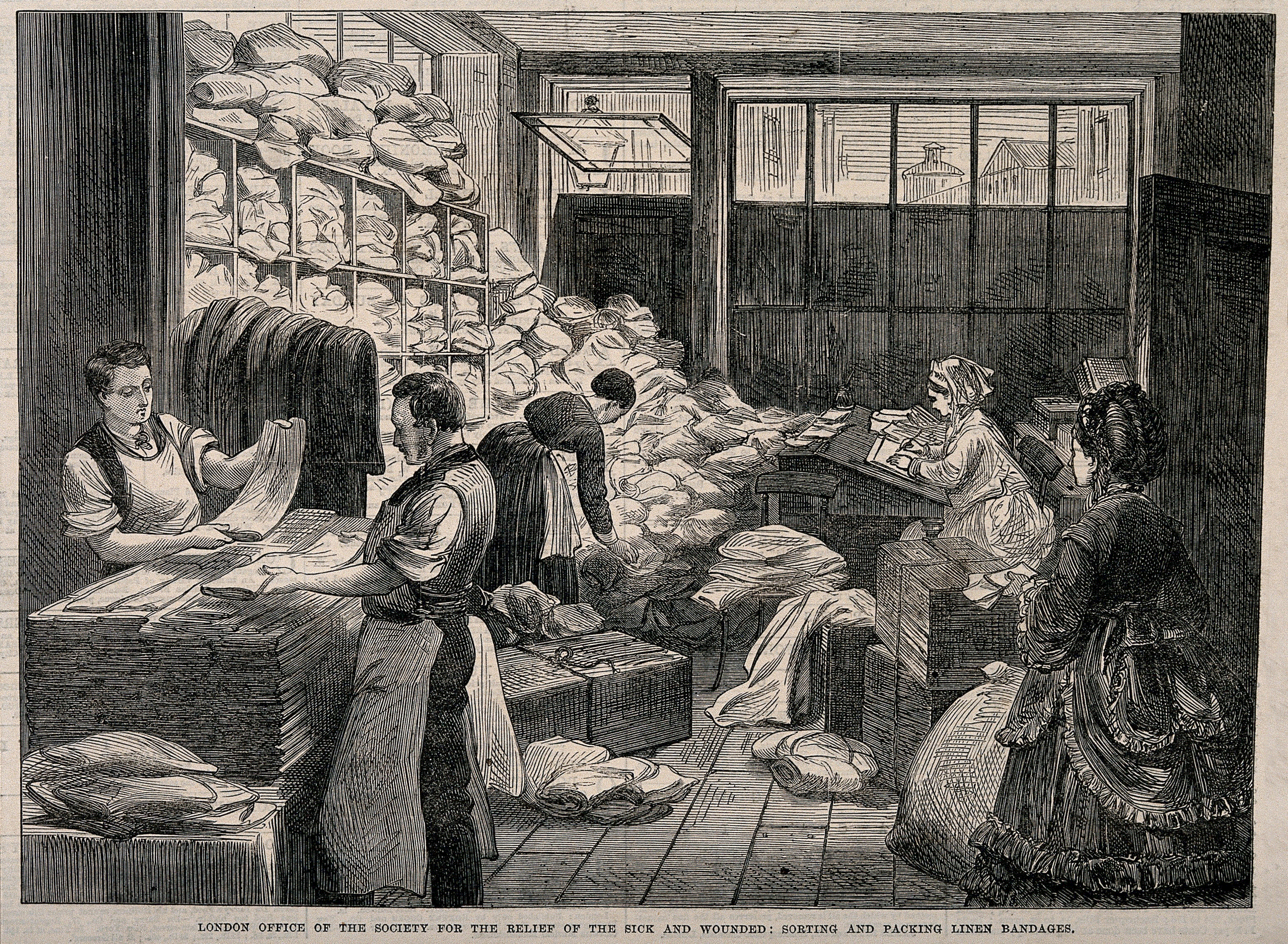
Sorting and packing linen bandages at the London office of the society, September 1870

The British National Society for Aid to the Sick and Wounded in War was founded at a public meeting in the Willis Rooms in London on 4 August 1870. Members paid a single £5 donation or an annual 5 shilling subscription. The organisation was led by Colonel Robert Loyd-Lindsay VC, another decorated Crimean War veteran, and its aims were to provide aid to the sick and wounded in war. It aimed to serve alongside the British Army during wartime but also alongside other neutral armies when Britain was at peace.

The organisation deployed several ambulances during the Franco-Prussian War. One of its major bases was Luxembourg, which was neutral during the war, and was used as a place to treat the wounded of the Battle of Metz. Hospitals were also established in Germany at Bingen am Rhein and at Darmstadt. By 17 September 1870 it had 62 surgeons and 16 nurses working as well as 22 other staff such as logistics officers. By the end of that month £200,000 had been raised to purchase drugs, surgical instruments, waterproof sheeting, fabric and lint. This was sent to the front at the rate of 4 tonnes per day over the 188 days of the war in 12,000 separate parcels. The organisation also acted to distribute supplies for the French Société de Secours which had been much disrupted by the war. The organisation also ran soup kitchens and restaurants for the benefit of the travelling wounded.

During the course of the war, thousands of casualties were treated by the organisations at its own hospitals and in those of the French and Prussian armies. The organisation's surgeons received special permission from William, King of Prussia to cross the German lines to provide aid during the Siege of Paris.

One notable ambulance was known as the Woolwich Ambulance, so called because it was equipped near to the Royal Arsenal under the supervision of the Director-General of the British Army Medical Department. It left for the front on 14 October with equipment and tentage for a hospital of 200 patients. It was commanded by Doctor Guy and consisted of 12 medical officers and 27 hospital corpsmen. The ambulance treated the wounded of the battles of Forcay, Bretoncelle, Bagneux and Beaune-la-Rolande.

The society's ambulance helped to advance good practice in battlefield medical care. One of its surgeons Joshua Henry Porter laid down rules for the safe transport of wounded from the battlefield – advocating a minimum of three stretcher bearers to each wounded man in case one were shot. He also implemented a two tiered system with an advanced treatment station near to the frontline backed up by a larger hospital. He advocated the quick transport of the wounded from the battlefield and helped to evaluate the effectiveness of stretchers and splints designed by his staff and that of the Anglo-American Ambulance.

The society continued its work after the war, serving in various European and British colonial conflicts before becoming the British Red Cross Society in 1905.

=== Franco-Irish Ambulance Brigade ===
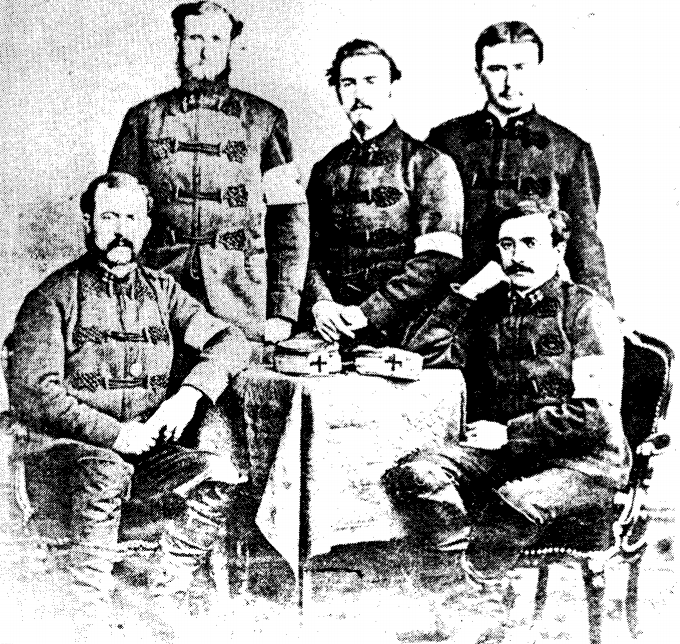
Members of the Franco-Irish Ambulance Brigade

The Franco-Irish Ambulance Brigade was established by the Irish Committee for the Relief of the Sick and Wounded of the French Army and Navy on 7 September 1870. It sent 31 surgeons and 250 men to France though almost immediately the majority of the men were released as surplus to requirements. Many of the released men joined the French Foreign Legion and it has been alleged that the ambulance was used as a means of bypassing the Foreign Enlistment Act 1870 which prevented British subjects from enlisting in foreign armies.

The ambulance treated the wounded from a battle at Pacy-sur-Eure before being split into detachments serving with the Army of the North and the Army of the Loire. The detachments treated the wounded of skirmishes at Châteaudun, Patay and Buchy and the First Battle of Orleans, the Battle of Loigny–Poupry and the Battle of Le Mans. A second Irish ambulance unit was raised in London but was turned away upon arrival at Caen as no arrangements had been made with the French authorities to accept it.

== See also ==
- Belgium and the Franco-Prussian War
- Robert Loyd-Lindsay, 1st Baron Wantage
