= 1873 Lisburn by-election =

UK Parliamentary by-election

The 1873 Lisburn by-election was held on 19 February 1873. The by-election was held due to the resignation in order to contest the County Armagh by-election of the incumbent Conservative MP, Edward Wingfield Verner. It was won by the unopposed Conservative candidate Sir Richard Wallace.
