= Macbeth and the Witches (Corot) =

Painting by Jean-Baptiste-Camille Corot

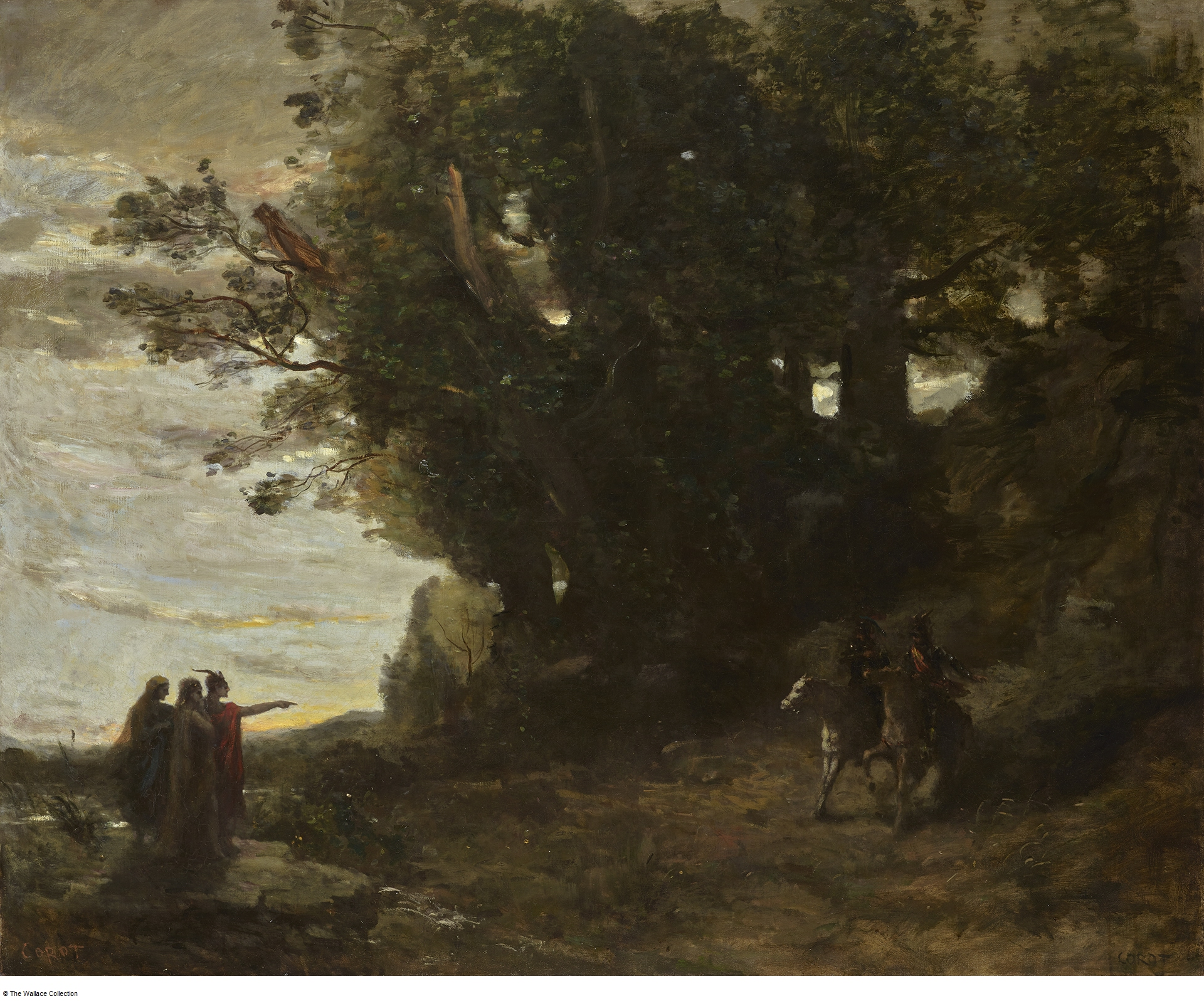
- Artist: Jean-Baptiste-Camille Corot
- Year: 1859
- Type: Oil on canvas, Landscape painting
- Dimensions: 111 cm × 135.7 cm (44 in × 53.4 in)
- Location: Wallace Collection, London

Macbeth and the Witches or simply Macbeth is an 1859 oil painting by the French artist Jean-Baptiste-Camille Corot. It blends landscape and history painting in a scene inspired by William Shakespeare's tragedy Macbeth. It depicts the moment when Macbeth, accompanied by Banquo encounters the Three Witches who prophesise his rise to the throne. Corot sets the scene on the eye of a forest with the three witches sillouhetted against the sky.

The painting was exhibited at the Salon of 1859 held in Paris, where it was admired by the young Claude Monet. It was subsequently acquired by the art collector Sir Richard Wallace and since 1897 has formed part of the Wallace Collection in London.

== Bibliography ==
- Ingamells, John. The Wallace Collection: French Nineteenth Century. Trustees of the Wallace Collection, 1985.
- Tinterow, Gary, Pantazzi, Michael & Pomarède, Vincent. Corot. Metropolitan Museum of Art, 1996
