= Jonathan Joseph Richardson =

Irish politician

Jonathan Richardson was an Irish politician. He was a member of the Quaker Richardson family and a relative of James Nicholson Richardson MP and Jonathan Richardson MP.

He was elected as a Member of Parliament for Lisburn in an 1853 by-election, following the death of the sitting member, Roger Johnson Smyth. He did not seek re-election in the 1857 general election, instead supporting the candidacy of his cousin, Jonathan Richardson

Parliament of the United Kingdom
Preceded by Roger Johnson Smyth	Member of Parliament for Lisburn; 1853–1857	Succeeded by Jonathan Richardson
