= John Murray Scott =

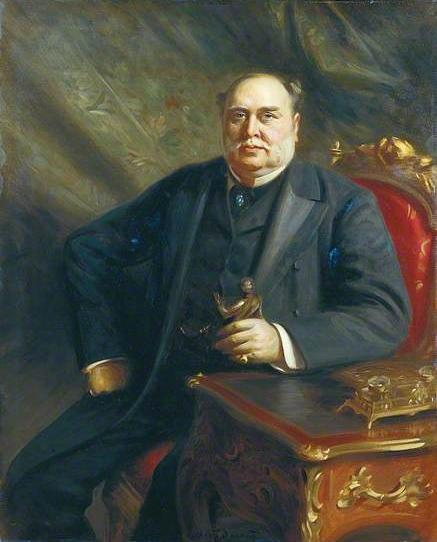
Sir John Murray Scott, 1st Baronet, portrait by Herman Herkomer (1863–1935), Wallace Collection

Sir John Edward Arthur Murray Scott, 1st Baronet of Connaught Place (1847–1912) was a British art historian and collector. He is often referred to as John Murray Scott. He is best known for his role in the formation of the Wallace Collection.

== Early life and family background ==
He was the eldest son of Dr. John Scott, a physician at Boulogne-sur-Seine, France; his mother Alicia Murray was daughter of George St. Vincent Thomas Nelson Murray, and granddaughter of George Murray RN.

Dr Scott moved to Chandos Street, Cavendish Square, London in 1861. He attended Richard Seymour-Conway, 4th Marquess of Hertford in his final illness, and was a friend of Sir Richard Wallace, 1st Baronet, the Marquess's illegitimate son. John Scott entered Lincoln's Inn in 1866, and was called to the bar in 1869. He became Wallace's private secretary in 1871.

Scott's younger brother Edward Maude Scott (1850–1917) began a career in 1869 as a civil servant with the Post Office He studied at Gloucester Theological College, and was ordained deacon in 1874, and priest in 1875. In 1877 he was appointed Rector of Orford Church, in the living of Sudbourne-cum-Orford, Suffolk. It was on Sir Richard Wallace's Sudbourne estate.

== Heir to Sir Richard and Lady Wallace ==
The art collector Sir Richard Wallace married in 1871 Julie Amelie Charlotte Castelnau, who became Lady Wallace, and died in 1890. His widow bequeathed to Scott much of Wallace's huge fortune and art collection, another part of which she donated to the nation as the Wallace Collection, supposedly on Scott's advice. She died in 1897.

== Later life ==
Scott inherited the lease of Hertford House, Wallace's London townhouse, which he sold to the government as a home for the Wallace Collection, and was awarded a baronetcy, on 23 February 1899, for his services in connection with the establishment of the collection: it opened as a museum in 1900. The collection consisted of the works of art in Hertford House in 1897, when Lady Wallace left them to Scott. It included most of the collection of the 4th Marquess of Hertford.

He also inherited: the Château de Bagatelle in Paris, with its 60-acre garden, which he sold to the City of Paris in 1904/5; Wallace's estates in Lisburn, Ulster; and the house at 2 rue Laffitte, Paris, with its valuable art collection ("A vast apartment ... a treasure-house which brought visitors from every part of Europe"). He moved his London residence to 5 Connaught Place, London.

Between 1903 and 1909 Scott built Nether Swell Manor in Gloucestershire as his country house, to the design of the architect Guy Dawber. He served as chairman of the trustees of the Wallace Collection and, from 1897, as a trustee of the National Gallery, London.

== Death ==
Sir John Scott died of a heart attack whilst attending a meeting at Hertford House, unmarried and without issue. He was buried in Orford churchyard.

== Legacy ==
Scott bequeathed to his mistress Victoria Sackville-West (Baroness Sackville) much of his property together with the sum of £150,000. She sold the art collection in the rue Laffitte apartment to the Paris art dealer Jacques Seligmann for £270,000.

It was believed by Scott's relatives that Victoria had exerted undue influence over him, and they challenged the will in court "in a blaze of publicity", but were unsuccessful. Jane Allen (2008) believes that "Lady Wallace had left her fortune to John Murray Scott simply because the family had become supportive friends. 'I don't attribute any evil motives to the Scotts; I don't think they were gold-diggers in the way that Victoria Sackville was'."

== Baronetcy ==
Escutcheon of the Scott baronets of Connaught Place (or Castle House)

The Scott Baronetcy, of Connaught Place in the County of London, was created in the Baronetage of the United Kingdom on 23 February 1899 for Scott. The title became extinct on his death in 1912.

== Notes ==
Baronetage of the United Kingdom
Preceded by Barry baronets	Scott baronets of Connaught; 23 February 1899	Succeeded by Way baronets
