= Sir Edward Wingfield Verner, 5th Baronet =

Sir Edward Wingfield Verner, 5th Baronet (22 November 1865 – 1 November 1936), was a British soldier.

Verner was the son of Sir Edward Wingfield Verner, 4th Baronet, and Selina Florence Nugent. He gained the rank of captain in the service of the Norfolk Regiment, and retired from the army in December 1901.

He married Agnes Dorothy Laming, daughter of Henry Laming, on 23 July 1901. He died on 1 November 1936 at age 70.

== Arms ==
Coat of arms of Sir Edward Wingfield Verner, 5th Baronet

Crest
A boar's head as in the arms.
Escutcheon
Argent on a fess Sable between three boars' heads of the second fretty Or a trefoil slipped of the last.
Motto
Pro Christo Et Patria

Baronetage of the United Kingdom
Preceded by Edward Verner	Baronet (of Verner's Bridge); 1899–1936	Succeeded by Derrick Verner
