= Jonathan Richardson (MP) =

Irish politician

Jonathan Richardson (born 1804) was an Irish politician. He was a member of the Quaker Richardson family and a relative of James Nicholson Richardson MP and Jonathan Joseph Richardson MP.

He was elected as a Member of Parliament for Lisburn in 1857, and again in 1859 as a Conservative, resigning in 1863.

Richardson lived at Kirkcassock House, County Down, which was designed by Alfred Waterhouse, ca. 1865.

== Arms ==
Coat of arms of Jonathan Richardson

Notes
Granted 9 February 1881 by Sir John Bernard Burke, Ulster King of Arms.
Crest
A lion rampant Argent armed and langued Gules holding between the paws a laurel garland Proper.
Escutcheon
Argent on a fess engrailed per saltire Azure and Gules between in chief a bull's head couped of the third and in base a galley Proper four escallops two in fess and two in pale Or.
Motto
Virtute Acquiritur Honos

Parliament of the United Kingdom
Preceded by Jonathan Joseph Richardson	Member of Parliament for Lisburn; 1857–1863	Succeeded by John Doherty Barbour
