= Thompson baronets of Wimpole Street (1899) =

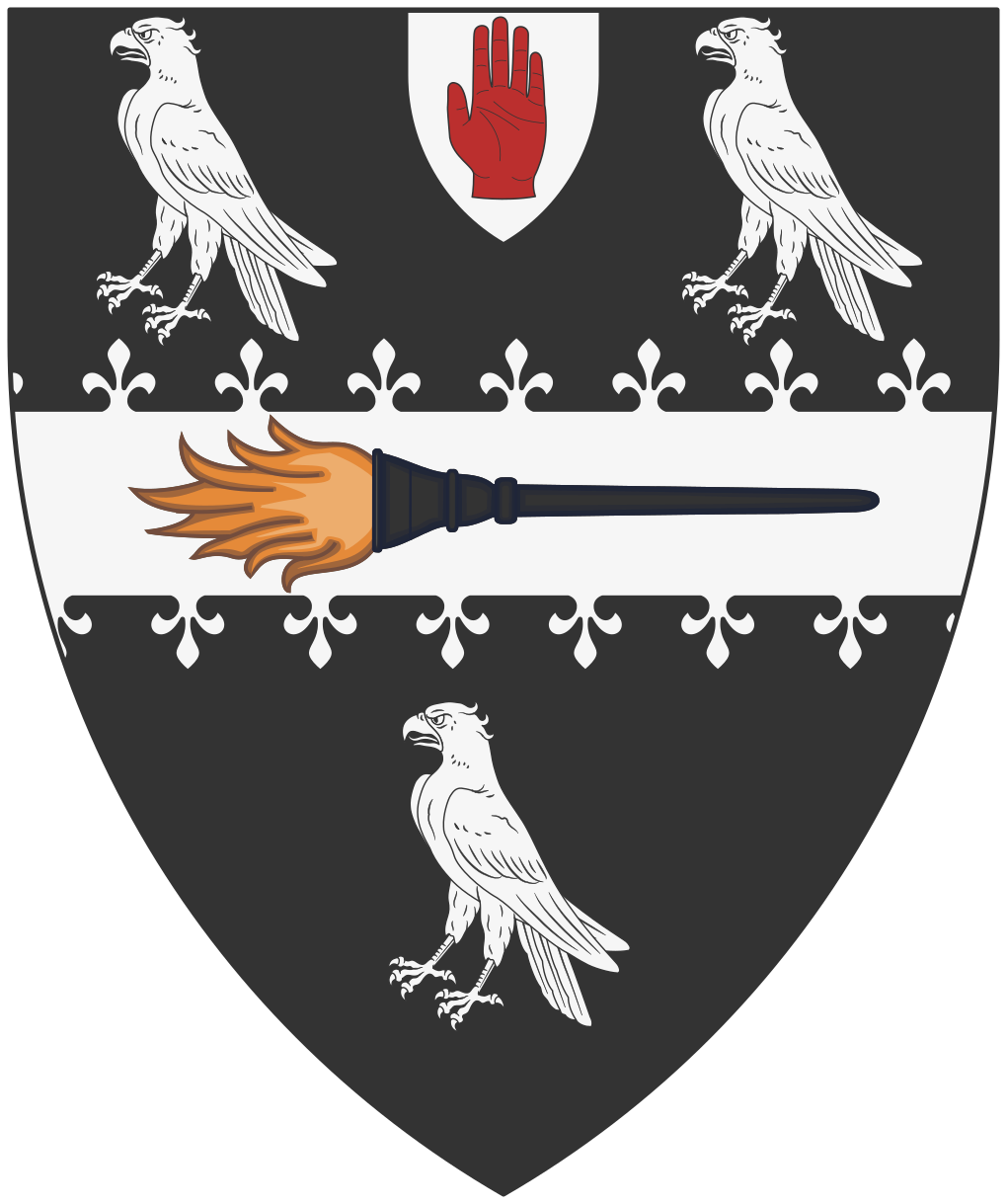
Arms of Thompson of Wimpole Street

The Thompson Baronetcy, of Wimpole Street in the City of London, was created in the Baronetage of the United Kingdom on 20 February 1899 for the surgeon Sir Henry Thompson.

The title became extinct on the death in 1944 of the 2nd Baronet, an Egyptologist, who was unmarried.

== Thompson baronets, of Wimpole Street (1899) ==
- Sir Henry Thompson, 1st Baronet (1820–1904)
- Sir Henry Francis Herbert Thompson, 2nd Baronet (1859–1944)

== Notes ==
Baronetage of the United Kingdom
Preceded by Tate baronets	Thompson baronets of Wimpole Street; 20 February 1899	Succeeded by Hornby baronets
