= John Dougherty Barbour =

Irish industrialist and politician

John Dougherty Barbour JP DL (3 March 1824 – 18 June 1901) was an Irish industrialist and politician. His middle name is sometimes written as "Doherty."

Born in Castle Street, Lisburn, County Antrim, the son of William Barbour, he entered the linen business (William Barbour & Sons) established by his grandfather in Lisburn. His brother, Thomas Barbour, opened a branch of the firm in America.

In 1863, Barbour was elected Member of Parliament for Lisburn as a Liberal. Prior to this, he had moved to his father's home, Hilden House, which he established as a place for entertainment. In the 1863 election, 263 votes were placed in the Lisburn constituency. A petition was presented against Barbour and, by June, he had been unseated as MP.

In 1864, he married the daughter of John Milne of Edinburgh. Amongst Barbour's children were Harold Barbour and Sir Milne Barbour, Bt., and Helen Reilly Barbour, who married Thomas Andrews, designer of the RMS Titanic.

Barbour later lived in Leamington Spa, where he was elected mayor in 1891, and at Hilden House. He died from kidney disease at his home, Conway House, in Dunmurry, aged 78.

Parliament of the United Kingdom
Preceded by Jonathan Richardson	Member of Parliament for Lisburn; February 1863 – June 1863	Succeeded by Edward Wingfield Verner
