= Harold Barbour =

Northern Irish politician

Harold Adrian Milne Barbour (7 July 1874 – 23 December 1938) was a unionist politician in Northern Ireland.

Barbour was born in Lisburn, the son of John Dougherty Barbour and Elizabeth Milne. Sir Milne Barbour was his elder brother. He studied at Harrow School and Brasenose College, Oxford before assuming the directorship of a linen company in Glasgow at some time before 1911. He was elected as an Irish Unionist Party county councillor, then served in the Senate of Northern Ireland from 1921 to 1929.

Barbour was also active in the co-operative movement in Ireland, and his photographs of rural north and west Ireland in the early years of the 20th-century have been widely exhibited.
