= Edward Wingfield Verner =

Irish landowner, British politician

Sir Edward Wingfield Verner, 4th Baronet (1 October 1830 – 21 June 1899) was a Conservative Party politician in Ireland who sat in the House of Commons of the United Kingdom from 1863 to 1880.

Verner was the second son of Sir William Verner, Bt (1782–1871) and his wife Harriet Wingfield. He was educated at Eton College and Christ Church, Oxford. He married Selina Florence, daughter of Thomas Vesey Nugent, on 15 December 1864.

Verner was elected as the Member of Parliament (MP) for Lisburn in 1863. He contested a by-election in February of that year, and was narrowly defeated by the Liberal Party candidate, industrialist John Doherty Barbour. However, that result was overturned on petition and at a second by-election in June he won the seat by 151 votes to Barbour's 90.

Verner held the Lisburn seat until 1873. His father William had been one of the two MPs for County Armagh, and on William's death Edward resigned his seat to stand in the by-election for Armagh. He was elected unopposed, and re-elected with a generous majority in 1874. He stood down at the 1880 general election, when his nephew William Edward was defeated by the Liberal candidate James Nicholson Richardson.

Outside of Parliament, Verner was High Sheriff of County Dublin in 1866. He lived at Corke Abbey, County Wicklow, and died on 21 June 1899.

== Arms ==
Coat of arms of Edward Wingfield Verner

Crest
A boar's head as in the arms.
Escutcheon
Argent on a fess Sable between three boars' heads of the second fretty Or a trefoil slipped of the last.
Motto
Pro Christo Et Patria

Parliament of the United Kingdom
Preceded by John Doherty Barbour	Member of Parliament for Lisburn; 1863 – 1873	Succeeded by Sir Richard Wallace, Bt
Preceded by Sir James Stronge, Bt; Sir William Verner, 2nd Bt	Member of Parliament for County Armagh; 1873 – 1880; With: Sir James Stronge, Bt	Succeeded by Sir James Stronge, Bt; James Nicholson Richardson
Baronetage of the United Kingdom
Preceded by William Verner	Baronet (of Verner's Bridge); 1886–1899	Succeeded by Edward Verner
