= Henry Meynell =

British politician and naval officer

Admiral Henry Meynell
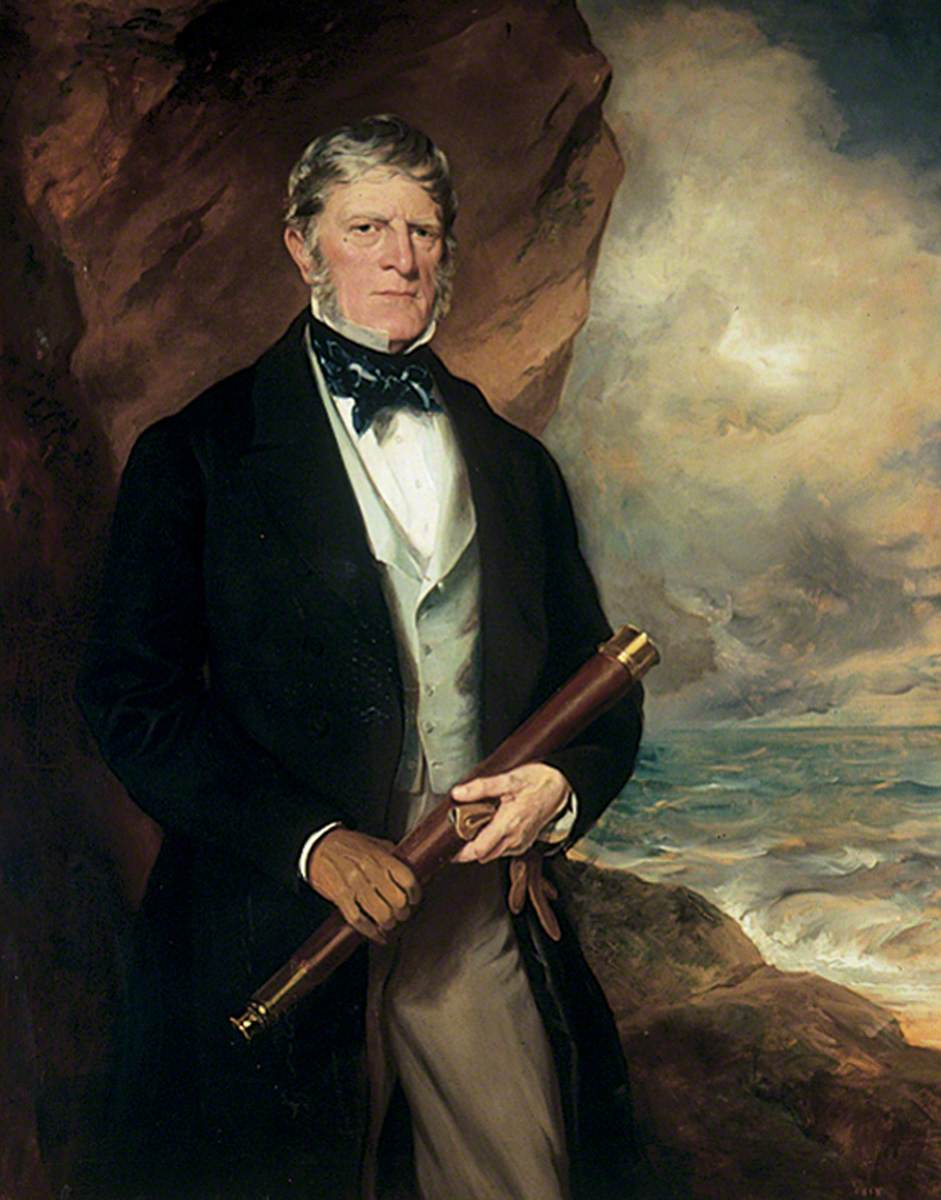

Member of Parliament for Lisburn
- In office 16 June 1826 – 5 August 1847
- Preceded by: Horace Seymour
- Succeeded by: Horace Seymour

Personal details
- Born: 24 August 1789
- Died: 24 March 1865 (aged 75) Grand Hotel du Louvre, Paris, France
- Resting place: Ashley, Staffordshire, England
- Party: Conservative/Tory

Military service
- Allegiance: United Kingdom
- Branch/service: Royal Navy
- Years of service: 1803–1865
- Rank: Admiral
- Commands: HMS Arrogant; HMS Cornwallis; HMS Jupiter; HMS Newcastle
- Battles/wars: Napoleonic Wars; Walcheren campaign

Henry Meynell (24 August 1789 – 24 March 1865) was a British Conservative and Tory politician and naval officer.

== Family and early life ==
Meynell was the second son of Hugo Meynell of Quorndon Hall, Leicestershire—himself son of his namesake, Hugo Meynell—and Elizabeth Ingram née Shepheard, daughter of Charles Ingram, 9th Viscount of Irvine. He was educated at Harrow School from 1797, alongside John Spencer, 3rd Earl Spencer.

== Naval career ==
In 1803, he entered the Royal Navy as a first-class volunteer, initially serving on the Isis in Newfoundland until 1805. He gradually rose up the ranks, first to midshipman in 1805, on the Pomone and Captain at Lisbon and home, as well on the Boreas and Lavinia in British waters and the Mediterranean.

He was then elevated lieutenant in 1809, where he joined the Theban in 1810, assisting with the capture of a French merchant brig near Dieppe in 1811, and then surviving the ship's wreck in 1812 during a storm while it was en route to India. Shortly after, he was nominated acting commander of the Arrogant at Bombay, and then made commander of the Cornwallis in 1813. Later that year, he was made acting captain of the Jupiter, before moving to the Newcastle in 1815, where he was confirmed as captain in 1816. During this latter period, he is said to have attracted the attention of Napoleon, whom Meynell described as having "refined manners and gentlemanly bearing, joined with the frankness and openness of a sailor".

He was seemingly paid off in September 1817, and then never returned to the seas despite expressing an interest to do so in 1821. However, by 1851, he was appointed as a rear-admiral, and then rose further to vice-admiral in 1857, and admiral in 1862.

== Political career ==
The cessation of his naval career led to Meynell being appointed as a gentleman usher quarterly waiter to George IV upon his coronation, with likely thanks due to Francis Ingram-Seymour-Conway, 2nd Marquess of Hertford, the Lord Chamberlain, and his wife, the regent's mistress.

Meynell was then elected Tory MP for Lisburn at the 1826 general election and held the seat until 1847 when he did not seek re-election. During this period, he generally voted against Catholic relief and against the repeal of the Test Acts, and was mistakenly expected to vote for Catholic emancipation, when he in fact cast his vote in the opposite way on at least three occasions.

Upon his retirement, he lived a "quite, unobtrusive life", eventually dying at the Grand Hotel du Louvre, Paris in March 1865, and then buried at the family vault in Ashley, Staffordshire.

Parliament of the United Kingdom
| Preceded by Horace Seymour | Member of Parliament for Lisburn; 1826–1847 | Succeeded by Horace Seymour |
