= Roger Johnson Smyth =

Irish politician (1815–1853)

Member of Parliament for Lisburn
- In office 11 December 1852 – 19 September 1853
- Preceded by: James Emerson Tennent
- Succeeded by: Jonathan Joseph Richardson

Personal details
- Born: 1815
- Died: 19 September 1853 (aged 37–38)
- Party: Peelite/Conservative

Roger Johnson Smyth (1815 – 19 September 1853) was an Irish Conservative and Peelite politician.

Smyth became Peelite MP for Lisburn at a by-election in December 1852—caused by the resignation of James Emerson Tennent—but died less than a year later in 1853.

Parliament of the United Kingdom
Preceded by James Emerson Tennent	Member of Parliament for Lisburn; 1852–1853	Succeeded by Jonathan Joseph Richardson
