= Verner baronets =

Extinct baronetcy in the Baronetage of the United Kingdom

The Verner Baronetcy, of Verner's Bridge in County Armagh, Northern Ireland, was a title in the Baronetage of the United Kingdom. It was created on 22 July 1846 for the soldier and politician William Verner. The second and fourth Baronets both represented County Armagh in Parliament. The title became extinct on the death of the sixth Baronet in 1975.

== Verner baronets of Verner's Bridge (1846) ==
- Sir William Verner, 1st Baronet (1782–1871)
- Sir William Verner, 2nd Baronet (1822–1873)
- Sir William Edward Hercules Verner, 3rd Baronet (1856–1886)
- Sir Edward Wingfield Verner, 4th Baronet (1830–1899)
- Sir Edward Wingfield Verner, 5th Baronet (1865–1936)
- Sir Edward Derrick Wingfield Verner, 6th Baronet (1907–1975)

== Arms ==
Coat of arms of Verner baronets

Crest
A boar's head as in the arms.
Escutcheon
Argent on a fess Sable between three boars' heads of the second fretty Or a trefoil slipped of the last.
Motto
Pro Christo Et Patria
