= Sir William Verner, 1st Baronet =

Irish landowner, British soldier and politician

Sir William Verner Bt KCH
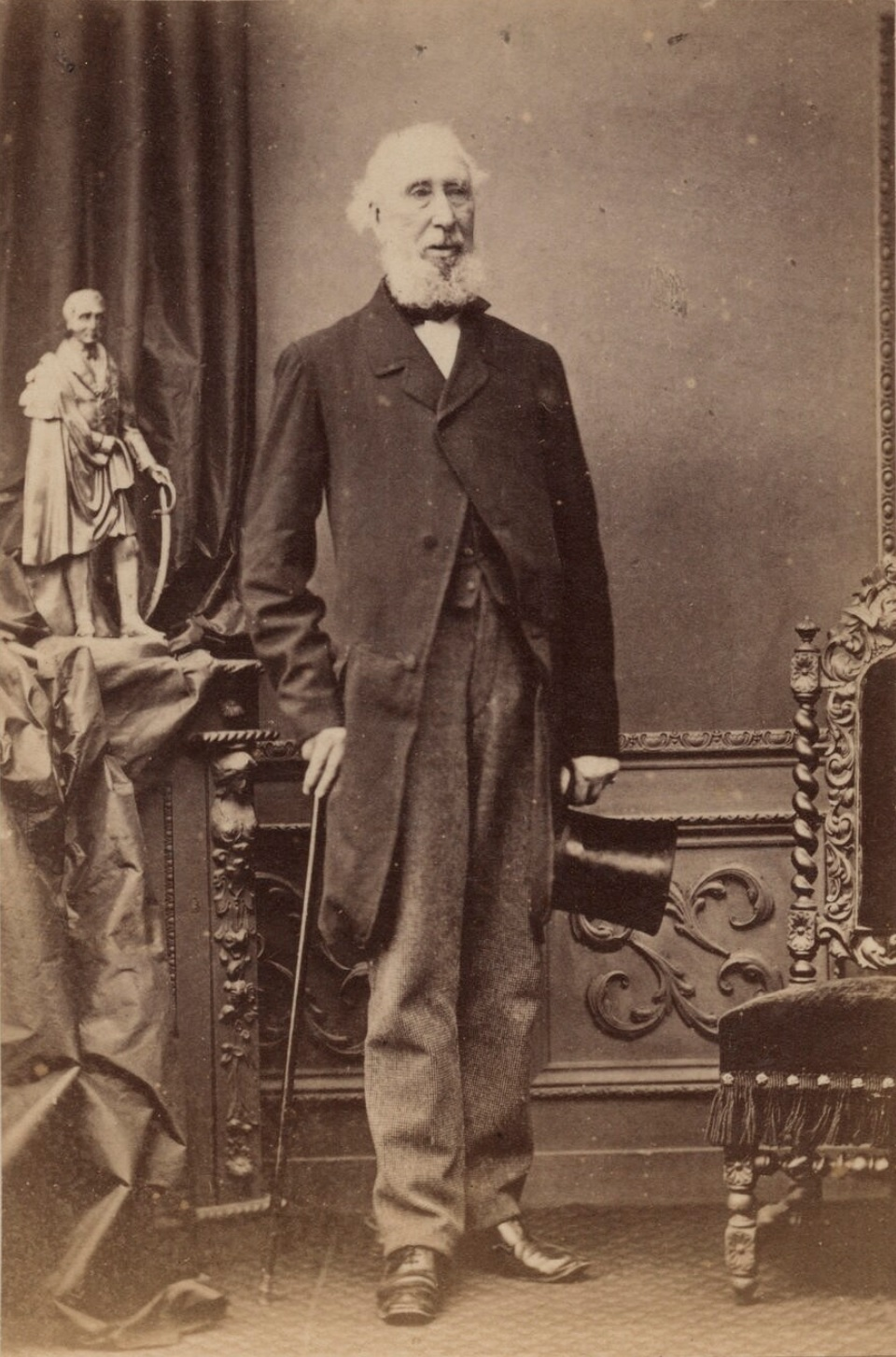
- Sir William Verner on 1860s portrait

Member of Parliament
- In office 1832–1868 Serving with Archibald Acheson to 1847; James Caulfeild 1847–1857; Maxwell Close 1857–1864; James Stronge from 1864
- Preceded by: Charles Brownlow; Archibald Acheson
- Succeeded by: William Verner; James Stronge
- Constituency: Armagh

High Sheriff of Tyrone
- In office 1823

High Sheriff of Armagh
- In office 1821

High Sheriff of Monaghan
- In office 1820

Personal details
- Born: 25 October 1782 County Armagh, Kingdom of Ireland
- Died: 20 January 1871 (aged 88) London, United Kingdom
- Party: Conservative Party (after 1834)
- Other political affiliations: Tory (before 1834)
- Spouse: Harriet Wingfield (m. 1819)
- Parents: James Verner (father); Jane Clarke (mother)
- Awards: Waterloo Medal

Military service
- Branch/service: British Army
- Rank: Colonel; Lieutenant colonel Staff
- Unit: 7th Queen's Own Hussars
- Battles/wars: Napoleonic Wars; Peninsular War; Battle of Corunna; Battle of the Pyrenees; Battle of Orthes; Battle of Toulouse; Waterloo campaign; Battle of Waterloo

Sir William Verner, 1st Baronet, KCH (25 October 1782 – 20 January 1871), was a British soldier who served in the Napoleonic Wars, was wounded at the Battle of Waterloo and resigned as a colonel. He served as a politician, including 36 years as a Member of Parliament. Two of his sons were also members of Parliament. Verner was made Knight Commander of the Hanoverian Order and a Baronet, and was Grand Master of Armagh and Orange Order of Ireland.

== Early life ==
William Verner was the son of Colonel James Verner, a Member of Parliament, and Jane Clarke. As a boy, he studied at Woodville, which overlooked Lucan, Dublin. He had the opportunity to attend Trinity College, Dublin, but preferred a career in the army.

== Military ==
Verner's interest in an army career began when he commanded the Churchill Yeomanry. At first, he was a staff officer under the Lord Lieutenant of Dublin in the 7th Queen's Own Hussars. He fought in the Peninsular War of the Napoleonic Wars at the Battle of Corunna under Sir John Moore in 1808–1809. He also fought at the Battle of the Pyrenees under the Duke of Wellington, in 1814 at the Battle of Orthes and the Battle of Toulouse, and in 1815 the Battle of Waterloo, rising to the rank of lieutenant-colonel in the 7th Queen's Own Hussars, under Lord Henry Paget, 1st Marquess of Anglesey. Verner was wounded by a musket shot to the head at Waterloo and retired from the army with the rank of colonel.

== Public service ==
William held three positions as High Sheriff: first for County Monaghan in 1820, County Armagh in 1821 and last for County Tyrone in 1823. He was also a Justice of the Peace and Deputy Lieutenant of Tyrone. (Note: According to John Kerr, "the Tory party being in opposition, William attended a banquet at which he drank a toast to "The Battle of the Diamond". The Whigs demanded an apology, which was refused, and William was stripped of his office of Deputy Lieutenant. When the Tories returned to power, he would not allow them to restore his office, but the Queen was asked to reward him, which she did by conferring a Baronetcy on him in 1846.") He was a member of the Conservative party and a Member of Parliament for County Armagh between 1832 and 1868.

A supporter of the Protestant Orange Order, he was once struck off the Commission of the Peace by Lord Normanby for toasting the Battle of the Diamond at a public dinner in Ireland.

== Personal life ==
=== Marriage and family ===
He married Harriet Wingfield, daughter of colonel the Hon. Edward Wingfield, younger son of The 3rd Viscount Powerscourt and Harriet Esther Westenra, on 19 October 1819. The couple had 2 sons and 8 daughters, at least 2 of which died in infancy. The children were buried at Powerscourt. He seemed to have good relationships with his children, who called their father "Taffy". They were:

- Sir William Verner, 2nd Baronet (4 Apr 1822 - 10 Jan 1873) became Member of Parliament for the County Armagh
- Sir Edward Wingfield Verner, 4th Baronet (1 Oct 1830 - 21 Jun 1899) 1863 an MP for Lisburn and after his older brother's death, became MP for County Armagh, a position he held until 1880 when he resigned.
- Emily Verner (d. 13 June 1911) married Rev. Hon. Francis Nathanial Clements, son of Nathaniel Clements, 2nd Earl of Leitrim. They had no children.
- Frederica Verner (d. 1909). She married Maj. Henry Guise, son of Sir John Wright Guise, 3rd Baronet. They had two sons.
- Constantia Henrietta Frances Verner (d. 7 Dec 1923). She married William Sandford Pakenham, son of the Very Rev. Hon. Henry Pakenham and Eliza Catherine Sandford. They had six sons and a daughter.
- Amelia
- Cecelia
- Frances Elizabeth
- Harriet Jane Isabella

=== Real estate ===
==== Churchill ====
Following the Battle of Waterloo, and seeing his father in failing health, he took over the running of the family estate, named Churchill, which included the house, a church with a bell inscribed to the Virgin Mary, (Note: According to John Kerr, in "1816, William's father James offered it to the Church of Ireland for their new building at Tartaraghan. The offer was refused because the bell was inscribed to the Virgin Mary.") and graveyard. In 1788, he received the estates following the death of Thomas Verner, Esquire, his paternal great uncle. In addition to Churchill in Armagh, Thomas Verner also had estates in Meath, Monaghan and Tyrone. Since William was only 5 years old in 1788, his parents James and Jane moved into the home with their family and were guardians of the residence until 1807.

During the Great Famine of Ireland (1845–1852), Verner offered work to any of his tenants in need and reduced rents by as much as half.

==== Inismagh ====
Verner also had property at Annahoe in County Tyrone, Ireland.

==== Eaton Square ====
Verner met his wife in London and after they were married they bought a home there at 86 Eaton Square. Harriet also visited her parents often at Corke Abbey.

=== Death ===
Verner had good health until 1870 when he began to decline. He died on 20 January 1871 at his home at Eaton Square. His body was sent to Loughgall, County Armagh, in Ulster for his funeral and burial. The procession was two miles long and was estimated to have included 10,000 people.

== Honours and arms ==
In 1837, he was also made Knight Commander of the Hanoverian Order by Sir Robert Peel or William IV. On 22 July 1846, Verner was created a baronet, of Verner's Bridge in the County of County Armagh. He was a Grand Master for Armagh and a Deputy Grand Master of the Orange Order for Ireland.

Coat of arms of Sir William Verner, 1st Baronet

Crest
A boar's head as in the arms.
Escutcheon
Argent on a fess Sable between three boars' heads of the second fretty Or a trefoil slipped of the last.
Motto
Pro Christo Et Patria

== See also ==
- Verner baronets
- Vernersbridge railway station

== Notes ==
Parliament of the United Kingdom
Preceded by Viscount Acheson; Charles Brownlow	Member of Parliament for County Armagh; 1832 – 1868; With: Viscount Acheson to 1847; James Caulfeild 1847–1857; Maxwell Charles Close 1857–1864; Sir James Stronge, Bt from 1864	Succeeded by Sir James Stronge, Bt; William Verner
Baronetage of the United Kingdom
New creation	Baronet (of Verner's Bridge); 1846–1871	Succeeded by William Verner
