= William Manley =

British army officer

William Manley VC CB
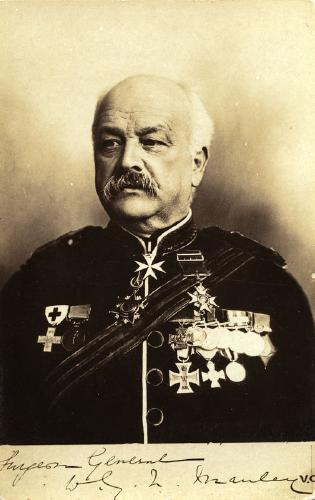
- Born: 17 December 1831; Dublin, Ireland
- Died: 16 November 1901 (aged 69); Cheltenham, Gloucestershire, England
- Military career
- Allegiance: United Kingdom
- Branch: (United Kingdom of Great Britain and Ireland) British Army
- Rank: Surgeon General
- Units: Royal Regiment of Artillery; Royal Army Medical Corps
- Campaigns: Crimean War: Sebastopol; New Zealand Wars; Franco-Prussian War; Second Anglo-Afghan War; Anglo-Egyptian War
- Awards: Victoria Cross; Companion of the Most Honorable Order of the Bath; Order of St John, Knight of Grace; Crimea Medal with Sebastopol clasp New Zealand War Medal; Afghanistan Medal; Egypt Medal with Tel-el-Kebir clasp Royal Humane Society Bronze Medal; Order of Osmanieh; Turkish Crimea Medal; Khedive's Star; Iron Cross, 2nd Class (Prussia); Military Merit Order (Bavaria); War Commemorative Medal of 1870/71; Cross of the "Société française de secours aux blessés militaires"

Surgeon General William George Nicholas Manley, VC CB (17 December 1831 – 16 November 1901) was a British Army officer, surgeon and a recipient of the Victoria Cross, the highest award for gallantry in the face of the enemy that can be awarded to British and Commonwealth forces. He received awards from several other countries and is the only person to have been awarded both the VC and the Iron Cross.

== Early life ==
Manley was born on 17 December 1831 in Dublin, Ireland, the second son of the Reverend William Nicholas Manley; his mother was a daughter of Dr. Brown of the Army Medical Staff. He was educated at the Blackheath Proprietary School and became a member of the Royal College of Surgeons of England in 1851.

== Military career ==
In 1854 Manley joined the army medical staff and was attached to the Royal Regiment of Artillery serving in Crimea. He was present for the Siege of Sevastopol during the Crimean War. He was later posted with his regiment in New Zealand.

=== Victoria Cross ===
Manley was 32 years old, an assistant surgeon in the Royal Regiment of Artillery during the Waikato-Hauhau Maori War, New Zealand, when the following deed took place on 29 April 1864 near Tauranga, New Zealand, during the assault on the rebel pā ("pah") Gate Pā, for which he was awarded the VC.

For his conduct during the assault on the Rebel Pah, near Tauranga, New Zealand, on the 29th of April last, in most nobly risking his own life, according to the testimony of Commodore Sir William Wiseman, Bart., C.B., in his endeavour to save that of the late Commander Hay, of the Royal Navy, and others. Having volunteered to accompany the storming party into the Pah, he attended on that Officer when he was carried away, mortally wounded, and then volunteered to return, in order to see if he could find any more wounded. It is stated that he was one of the last Officers to leave the Pah.

He served in the same war under Sir Trevor Chute and was present at the assault and capture of the Okotukou, Putahi, Otapawe, and Waikohou Pahs. For his services on these occasions he was again mentioned in dispatches and promoted to staff surgeon.

=== Later career ===
When the Franco-Prussian War broke out in 1870, Manley proceeded with the British Ambulance Corps and was attached to the 22nd division of the Prussian Army. He was present for several battles and received a number of decorations including the Iron Cross (second class) on the recommendation of the German Crown Prince:

For services with the British Ambulance Corps caring for the wounded of the 22nd Division in the actions of Chateau-neuf and Bretoncelle, on 18th and 21st December 1870, and the battles of Orleans and Cravant, on 10th December 1870.

In 1878–79 he served with the Quetta Field force in the Second Anglo-Afghan War, and in 1882 he was in Egypt for the Anglo-Egyptian War as Principal Medical officer of the Second Division under Sir Edward Hamley and was present at the Battle of Tel el-Kebir. After this war he was promoted to Deputy Surgeon-General.

== Later life ==
Manley was awarded the honorary rank of surgeon general and retired from the army in 1884 with a distinguished service pension. Upon retirement he was made a Knight of the Venerable Order of Saint John of Jerusalem and a Companion of the Order of the Bath. He died in Cheltenham, Gloucestershire, on 16 November 1901.

== Family ==
He married Miss M. E. Darton, daughter of Thomas Hartwood Darton, of Temple Dinsley, Hertfordshire. They had one daughter and five sons, including Lieutenant G. E. D. Manley, who died while on service in China shortly before his father's death in 1901.

== Honours and awards ==
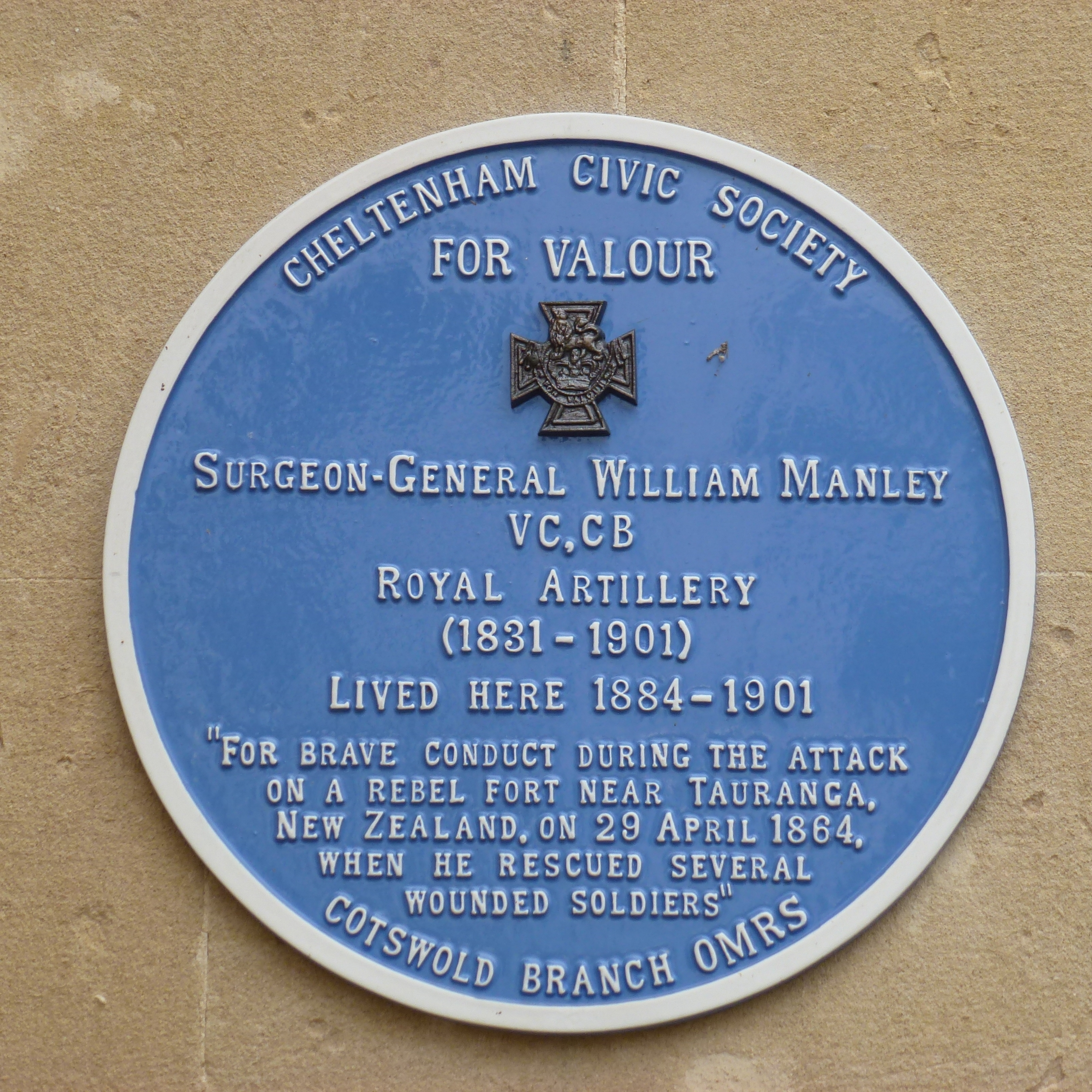
Blue plaque honouring William Manley VC in Cheltenham

Manley was awarded 18 medals by several countries and was the only recipient of both the VC and the Iron Cross, the highest medals of the United Kingdom and Prussia (later part of the German Empire).

Among his awards were:

| Ribbon | Description | Notes |
| | Crimea Medal | Decoration awarded in 1855; Clasp : Sebastopol; (United Kingdom) |
| | Victoria Cross (VC) | Decoration awarded on 23 September 1864; Citation for Victoria Cross (VC); (United Kingdom) |
| | Afghanistan Medal | Decoration awarded in 1879; Bar ??; (United Kingdom) |
| | Egypt Medal | Decoration awarded in 1882; Bar Tel-El-Kebir; (United Kingdom) |
| | Order of the Bath | Decoration awarded in 1894; Companion level (CB); (United Kingdom) |
| | Order of St John (chartered 1888) | Decoration awarded in 1894; Knight of Grace level (KStJ); (United Kingdom) |
| | Iron Cross | Decoration awarded in 1871; 2nd Class for Non-combatants; (Kingdom of Prussia) |
| | War Commemorative Medal of 1870/71 | Decoration awarded in 1871; Made of steel as for Non-combatants; (German Empire) |
| | Military Merit Order (Bavaria) | Decoration awarded in 1871; (Kingdom of Bavaria) |
| | Order of Osmanieh | Decoration awarded in 1880; third class; (Ottoman Empire) |
| | Khedive's Star | Decoration awarded in 1882; (Ottoman Empire) |

During his time in New Zealand he also received the bronze medal of the Royal Humane Society for rescuing a man from drowning, and after the siege of Paris he received the Cross of the Société française de secours aux blessés militaires.

| Ribbon | Description | Notes |
| | Royal Humane Society | Decoration awarded in 1855; (United Kingdom) |
| | Société française de secours aux blessés militaires | Decoration awarded c.1871; (France) |

His medals were on display in the medals gallery of Firepower - The Royal Artillery Museum in Woolwich, south east London until its closure in July, 2016.

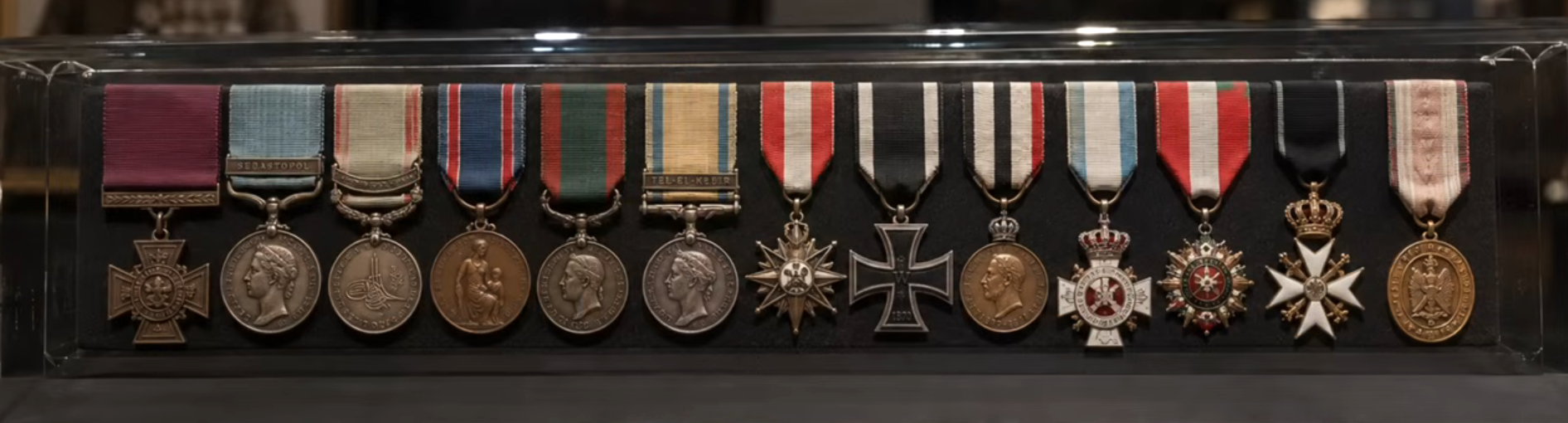
English, Prussian, Egyptian, and Ottoman Medals awarded to William Manley
