= Derrick Verner =

Anglo-Irish soldier (1907–1975)

Sir Edward Derrick Wingfield Verner, 6th Baronet (28 May 1907 – 27 March 1975) was an Anglo-Irish soldier, usually known as Derrick Verner.

The son of Sir Edward Wingfield Verner, 5th Baronet, by his marriage to Agnes Dorothy Laming, Verner was educated at Gresham's School, Holt, in Norfolk, and Magdalen College, Oxford, where he graduated Bachelor of Arts in 1928. Unfortunately for Verner, the family estates in Ireland had been separated from the title in 1886, when the third baronet left them to an adopted son. However, his father had inherited Corke Abbey, and the family lived there until 1922, when Verner's father sold up and settled in England.

Verner gained the rank of Lieutenant in the service of the Rifle Brigade. He married Angèle Becco, daughter of Louis Becco, on 7 February 1948. He died in 1975, without issue. Verner's younger brother, John Wingfield Verner, had married Sybil Leigh-Pemberton in 1934, but he also had no children and died in 1943, so with Verner's death, the title became extinct.

== Arms ==
Coat of arms of Derrick Verner

Crest
A boar's head as in the arms.
Escutcheon
Argent on a fess Sable between three boars' heads of the second fretty Or a trefoil slipped of the last.
Motto
Pro Christo Et Patria

Baronetage of the United Kingdom
Preceded by Edward Verner	Baronet (of Verner's Bridge); 1936–1975	Extinct
