= Julie Amelie Charlotte Castelnau =

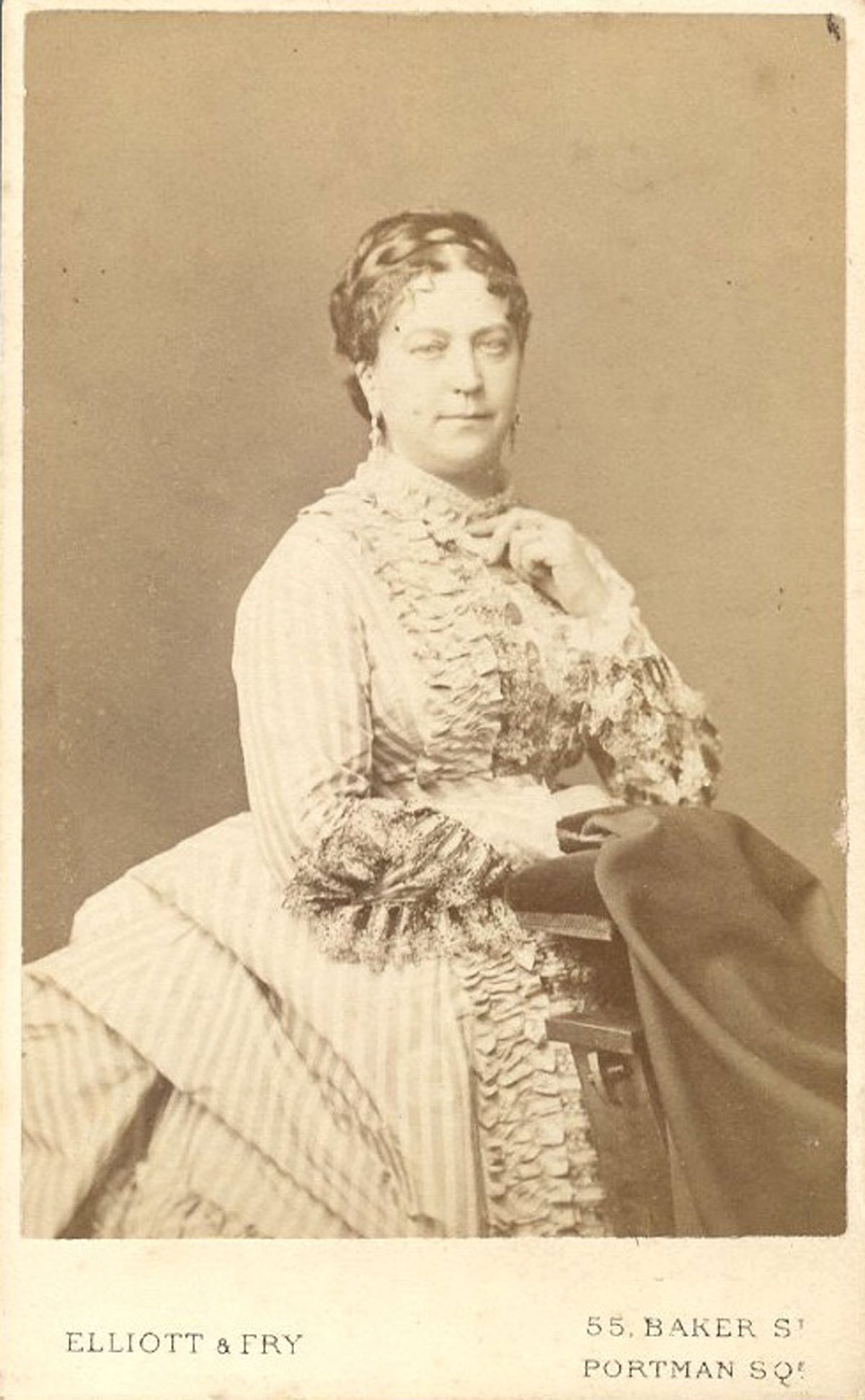
- Born: c. 1819
- Died: 1897

Julie Amelie Charlotte Castelnau, known from 1871 as Lady Wallace (c. 1819 – 1897) is best known today for her "bequest to the Nation" of about 5,500 artworks that resulted in the Wallace Collection, which opened in her marital home 13 years after her death. Her bequest was almost certainly in fulfilment of the wishes of her late husband Sir Richard Wallace, 1st Baronet, who together with his father and grandfather, the 3rd and 4th Marquesses of Hertford, had amassed the majority of the collection.

Julie Amelie met her illegitimately-born husband Richard Jackson in Paris and their illegitimate son Georges Henry Edmond Castelnau was born in 1840, 30 years before they were legally married as M. & Mme. Wallace. Since little of her own correspondence has survived, what few details of her early life are from her husband's correspondence or sources outside the direct family. Richard had been born in London but from age six he was raised in Paris by his grandmother, Maria Fagnani, 3rd Marchioness of Hertford, who was the estranged wife of the 3rd marquess.

Richard Jackson was a companion to her three children and by 1842 he, Julie Amelie, and son Georges were living nearby her together with Maria's youngest, Lord Henry Seymour. Their home was also close to Maria's eldest son, who had become Lord Hertford upon the death of his father, which expanded the family fortunes considerably. 1842 was also the year that Richard Jackson took on the maiden name of his birth mother Mrs. Agnes Jackson (née Wallace), presumably upon learning his true parentage at the inquest of his grandfather. In subsequent decades father and son remained neighbors and were art collectors together, following in the art collecting interests of (grand)mother Maria. After Lord Hertford's death in 1870, Julie Amelie and Richard finally obtained legal recognition of Richard's parentage as the son of Lord Hertford in 1871 and they married. Lord Hertford had never married, and his titles went to a distant cousin but he left his unentailed estates and art collection (which they had often jointly collected) to Richard.

The Wallace couple were well known for charitable works in Paris, especially during the Siege of Paris (1870–71). Richard was awarded a baronetcy 24 December 1871 and the Legion d'Honneur in 1872. The sculptor Charles-Auguste Lebourg made a bust of Lady Wallace that was shown at the Paris Salon in 1872.

Somewhat shaken after the Franco-Prussian War and worried about a home for his large art collection, Sir Richard decided to move to London. His London home was open to visitors and it is unknown if Sir Richard meant it to become a museum. After his death, Lady Wallace continued her charity works and her son having pre-deceased her husband, she left only minor real estate to her grandchildren and left the remainder of her husband's art collection not gifted to the nation, and his mansions and estates in France, Ireland and London, to her private secretary John Murray Scott who had served the couple throughout their marriage. Scott claimed much of the credit for having persuaded her to make the bequest to the Nation, and claimed that she had intended to leave all to him. For Scott's assistance in selling Hertford House (which he had inherited) to the government as a permanent home for the Collection, he was created a baronet.

The bulk of her husband's art collection was left in her "bequest to the Nation", in a gesture that was unprecedented, as it stipulated that admission must be free of charge, which has continued up to the present day. This bequest became an example for many other art collectors, because it was exempt from the recently (16 April 1894) instituted estate duty, and which avoided the tax that would otherwise have impacted Scott’s inheritance, who was not related to Lady Wallace in any way.
