= Lisburn (UK Parliament constituency) =

UK parliamentary constituency in Ireland, 1801–1885

- Former borough constituency for the House of Commons
- County: County Antrim
- Borough: Lisburn

1801–1885
- Seats: 1
- Created from: Lisburn (IHC)
- Replaced by: South Antrim

Lisburn was a United Kingdom parliamentary constituency, in Ireland, returning one MP from 1801 to 1885.

== History ==
It was an original constituency represented in Parliament when the Union of Great Britain and Ireland took effect on 1 January 1801.

It was disfranchised under the Redistribution of Seats Act 1885, which took effect at the 1885 general election.

== Boundaries ==
This constituency was the parliamentary borough of Lisburn in County Antrim. In November 1831, commissioners proposed boundaries for the borough. It was defined by the Parliamentary Boundaries (Ireland) Act 1832 as:

The several Townlands of Lisnagarvy, Tonagh, and Old Warren, in the Parish of Blaris; also that Portion of the Townland of Lambeg that lies to the West of the River Lagan, and is bounded as follows; namely, on the South and West by the Townland of Lisnagary, on the North between the Belsize Road and the old Belfast Road by a small Stream which is the Boundary of the Townland of Maghreleave, and on the East by the old Belfast Road from the Point where the same crosses the above-mentioned small Stream to the Point where it is met by the Lower Road near Lambeg Glebe; thence along the said Lower Road to the Point where the same is met by "Wheelers Ditch"; thence along Wheelers Ditch to the River Lagan.

Also the Space contained between the River Lagan and the following Boundary; (that is to say,)

From the Bridge along the Drumbo Road for about Five hundred Yards to the Point at which the same is met by another Road coming out of the Suburb; thence, Eastward, along a Ditch, on the North Side of which Fir Trees are planted for about Two hundred and sixty Yards, to the Point at which the said Ditch meets a Lane running to the River; thence along that Lane to the River.

Also the small Island on the River Lagan in which are situated the Vitrol Works.

Also that Portion of the Townland of Knockmore which has hitherto formed a Part of the Borough.

== Members of Parliament ==
Election	Member	Party	Note
1 January 1801	George Hatton	Tory	1801: Co-opted
12 July 1802	Earl of Yarmouth	Tory	
20 October 1812	Lord Henry Moore	Tory	
29 June 1818	John Leslie Foster	Tory	Also returned by and elected to sit for Armagh City
22 February 1819	Horace Seymour	Tory	
16 June 1826	Henry Meynell	Tory	
18 December 1834	Henry Meynell	Conservative	
5 August 1847	Horace Seymour	Peelite	Died 23 November 1851
5 January 1852	Sir James Emerson Tennent	Conservative	Resigned
11 December 1852	Roger Johnson Smyth	Peelite	Died 19 September 1853
14 October 1853	Jonathan Joseph Richardson	Radical	Did not seek re-election
2 April 1857	Jonathan Richardson	Whig	
28 April 1859	Jonathan Richardson	Conservative	Resigned
23 February 1863	John Dougherty Barbour	Liberal	Unseated on petition - new writ issued
23 June 1863	Edward Wingfield Verner	Conservative	Resigned
19 February 1873	Sir Richard Wallace, Bt	Conservative	Last MP for the constituency
1885	Constituency abolished		

== Elections ==
=== Elections in the 1830s ===
General election 1830: Lisburn
Party	Candidate	Votes	%
Tory	Henry Meynell	Unopposed	
Registered electors		56	
Tory hold			

General election 1831: Lisburn
Party	Candidate	Votes	%
Tory	Henry Meynell	Unopposed	
Registered electors		56	
Tory hold			

General election 1832: Lisburn
Party	Candidate	Votes	%
Tory	Henry Meynell	Unopposed	
Registered electors		91	
Tory hold			

General election 1835: Lisburn
Party	Candidate	Votes	%
Conservative	Henry Meynell	Unopposed	
Registered electors		134	
Conservative hold			

General election 1837: Lisburn
Party	Candidate	Votes	%
Conservative	Henry Meynell	Unopposed	
Registered electors		156	
Conservative hold			

=== Elections in the 1840s ===
General election 1841: Lisburn
Party	Candidate	Votes	%	±%
Conservative	Henry Meynell	Unopposed		
Registered electors		203		
Conservative hold				

Meynell was appointed a Groom in Waiting to Queen Victoria, requiring a by-election.

By-election, 20 September 1841: Lisburn
Party	Candidate	Votes	%	±%
Conservative	Henry Meynell	Unopposed		
Conservative hold				

General election 1847: Lisburn
Party	Candidate	Votes	%	±%
Peelite	Horace Seymour	Unopposed		
Registered electors		462		
Peelite gain from Conservative				

=== Elections in the 1850s ===
Seymour's death caused a by-election.

By-election, 5 January 1852: Lisburn
Party	Candidate	Votes	%	±%
Conservative	James Emerson Tennent	Unopposed		
Conservative gain from Peelite				

General election 1852: Lisburn
Party	Candidate	Votes	%	±%
Conservative	James Emerson Tennent	Unopposed		
Registered electors		188		
Conservative gain from Peelite				

Tennent resigned by accepting the office of Steward of the Manor of Northstead, causing a by-election.

By-election, 11 December 1852: Lisburn
Party	Candidate	Votes	%	±%
Peelite	Roger Johnson Smyth	99	53.2	N/A
Conservative	John Inglis	87	46.8	N/A
Majority		12	6.4	N/A
Turnout		186	85.7	N/A
Registered electors		217		
Peelite gain from Conservative		Swing	N/A	

Smyth's death caused a by-election.

By-election, 14 October 1853: Lisburn
Party	Candidate	Votes	%	±%
Radical	Jonathan Joseph Richardson	Unopposed		
Registered electors		217		
Radical gain from Conservative				

General election 1857: Lisburn
Party	Candidate	Votes	%	±%
Whig	Jonathan Richardson	138	51.3	N/A
Conservative	James McGarel-Hogg	131	48.7	N/A
Majority		7	2.6	N/A
Turnout		269	90.9	N/A
Registered electors		296		
Whig hold		Swing	N/A	

General election 1859: Lisburn
Party	Candidate	Votes	%	±%
Conservative	Jonathan Richardson	Unopposed		
Registered electors		314		
Conservative gain from Whig				

=== Elections in the 1860s ===
Richardson resigned, causing a by-election.

By-election, 23 February 1863: Lisburn
Party	Candidate	Votes	%	±%
Liberal	John Dougherty Barbour	140	51.1	New
Conservative	Edward Wingfield Verner	134	48.9	N/A
Majority		6	2.2	N/A
Turnout		274	87.5	N/A
Registered electors		313		
Liberal gain from Conservative				

On petition, Barbour was unseated due to his and his agent's bribery and treating, causing a by-election.

By-election, 26 June 1863: Lisburn
Party	Candidate	Votes	%	±%
Conservative	Edward Wingfield Verner	151	62.1	N/A
Liberal	Jonathon Richardson (MP)	90	37.0	N/A
Independent Liberal	Robert Barbour	2	0.8	New
Majority		61	25.1	N/A
Turnout		243	77.6	N/A
Registered electors		313		
Conservative hold				

General election 1865: Lisburn
Party	Candidate	Votes	%	±%
Conservative	Edward Wingfield Verner	134	66.0	N/A
Liberal	John Dougherty Barbour	69	34.0	N/A
Majority		65	32.0	N/A
Turnout		203	64.9	N/A
Registered electors		313		
Conservative hold				

General election 1868: Lisburn
Party	Candidate	Votes	%	±%
Conservative	Edward Wingfield Verner	Unopposed		
Registered electors		469		
Conservative hold				

=== Elections in the 1870s ===
Verner's resigned to contest the 1873 County Armagh by-election.

By-election, 19 Feb 1873: Lisburn
Party	Candidate	Votes	%	±%
Conservative	Richard Wallace	Unopposed		
Registered electors		568		
Conservative hold				

General election 1874: Lisburn
Party	Candidate	Votes	%	±%
Conservative	Richard Wallace	Unopposed		
Registered electors		519		
Conservative hold				

=== Elections in the 1880s ===
General election 1880: Lisburn
Party	Candidate	Votes	%	±%
Conservative	Richard Wallace	Unopposed		
Registered electors		768		
Conservative hold				
