= Hornby baronets =

Extinct baronetcy in the Baronetage of the United Kingdom

Escutcheon of the Hornby baronets

Harry Hornby, 1st Baronet, in an 1895 publication

The Hornby baronetcy, of Brookhouse in the Parish of Saint Michael, Blackburn, in the County Palatine of Lancaster, was a title in the Baronetage of the United Kingdom. It was created on 21 February 1899 for the politician William Hornby, from 1886 to 1910 Member of Parliament for Blackburn. His father, William Henry Hornby (1805–1884), had held a Blackburn seat from 1857 to 1869.

The title became extinct on the death of the 2nd Baronet in 1971.

== Hornby baronets, of Brookhouse (1899) ==
- Sir William Henry Hornby, 1st Baronet (1841–1928)
- Sir Henry Russell Hornby, 2nd Baronet (1888–1971)

Baronetage of the United Kingdom
Preceded by Thompson baronets	Hornby baronets of Brookhouse; 21 February 1899	Succeeded by Barry baronets
