= Barry baronets of St Leonard's Hill and Keiss Castle (1899) =

Escutcheon of the Barry baronets of St Leonard's Hill and Keiss Castle

The Barry baronetcy, of St Leonard's Hill in Clewer in the County of Berkshire and Keiss Castle in the County of Caithness, was created in the Baronetage of the United Kingdom on 22 February 1899 for the businessman and politician Francis Barry. He had made a fortune from business interests in Portugal, including the Sao Domingos Mine in the Alentejo. He had already been created Baron de Barry by King Luís I of Portugal in 1876. He represented Windsor in the House of Commons from 1890 to 1906 and was a benefactor to the town.

He was succeeded by his second but eldest surviving son, the 2nd Baronet. He was a Lieutenant-Colonel in the Berkshire Yeomanry and also served as High Sheriff of Berkshire in 1907 and vice Lord Lieutenant for the county.

== Barry baronets, of St Leonard's Hill and Keiss Castle (1899) ==
- Sir Francis Tress Barry, 1st Baronet (1825–1907)
- Sir Edward Arthur Barry, 2nd Baronet (1858–1949)
- Sir Claude Francis Barry, 3rd Baronet (1883–1970)
- Sir Rupert Rodney Francis Tress Barry, 4th Baronet (1910–1977)
- Sir Lawrence Edward Anthony Tress Barry, 5th Baronet (1939–2026)
- Sir William Rupert Philip Tress Barry, 6th Baronet (born 1973)

The heir apparent is the present holder's son Finnian Joshua Antoni Barry (born 2004).

== Notes ==
Baronetage of the United Kingdom
Preceded by Hornby baronets	Barry baronets of St Leonard's Hill and Keiss Castle; 22 February 1899	Succeeded by Scott baronets
