= Sir William Verner, 3rd Baronet =

Sir William Edward Hercules Verner, 3rd Baronet (11 January 1855 – 8 June 1886) was a British baronet. He studied at Eton. From his father, he inherited Churchill estates in Ireland and a home at Eaton Square in London. He died at the age of 30 of cirrhosis of the liver without issue, although he had a stepson he cared for.

== Early life ==
Verner was born the son of Sir William Verner, 2nd Baronet and his wife Mary Pakenham. He was baptised at home due to illness.

His early education is unknown, but it is theorised that he may have had a tutor as a child. From 1870 to 1872, Verner attended Eton College. His father died in 1873 and William was to inherit his father's estate when he married or turned 21 years of age. In the meantime, William's father's provided for two homes for the boy, who was known as Billy, and his mother: one was the Churchill house or mansion in Northern Ireland and the other was at Eaton Square in London, where his mother liked to live.

His guardian arranged for a "Grand Tour" that included China, Australia and America when he became 18. He was accompanied by a Mr Greenslade.

== Marriage and adult life ==
Billy met a woman and her son, Miss Annie Wilson and Harry, from Melbourne, Australia, and soon after becoming 21, he married her on 29 January 1877. Annie was the daughter of John Wilson, Esquire of Melbourne, Australia. The family, though, "was not pleased" with the marriage. They entertained "lavishly" and travelled between their homes at Churchill and Eaton Square. Within nine years of inheriting his father's estate, William took out a loan for £60,000.

Harry took the surname Verner, received a private education and attended Eton from 1882 to 1884.

He died at 30 years of age on 8 June 1886 of cirrhosis of the liver and was buried at Loughgall in Ireland. William mentioned his stepson in his will. There were no other children. Annie inherited his estate and died 2 years after her husband. They were interred in the same tomb.

== Arms ==
Coat of arms of Sir William Verner, 3rd Baronet

Crest
A boar's head as in the arms.
Escutcheon
Argent on a fess Sable between three boars' heads of the second fretty Or a trefoil slipped of the last.
Motto
Pro Christo Et Patria

== See also ==
- Verner baronets

Baronetage of the United Kingdom
Preceded by William Verner	Baronet (of Verner's Bridge); 1873–1886	Succeeded by Edward Wingfield Verner
