= Sir William Verner, 2nd Baronet =

Irish landowner, British politician

Sir William Verner, 2nd Baronet (4 April 1822 – 10 January 1873), was a British soldier and Conservative Party politician.

Sir William Verner was the son of Sir William Verner, 1st Baronet, and of Harriet Wingfield, daughter of Colonel Edward Wingfield, who was the younger son of The 3rd Viscount Powerscourt.

After serving in the Coldstream Guards in 1841, Verner married on 6 August 1850 Mary Pakenham, daughter of Lieutenant-General the Hon. Sir Hercules Robert Pakenham. Their children included William, Edith and Alice Emily (died 1908). Alice married firstly Christopher Nevile Bagot of Augharne Castle, County Galway, who died in 1877, having by his last will disinherited their son William, a decision which led to the celebrated probate case Bagot v. Bagot, in which Alice successfully defended her son's rights. She married, secondly, Major Reginald Roberts.

The family lived in both London and on the Churchill Estate in the northwest of County Armagh in Ulster. In the early 1860s they moved to Corke Abbey, a Wingfield estate, also in Ulster.

He was Member of Parliament for County Armagh between 1868 and 1873.

He died in 1873, one year after making a will and almost exactly two years following the death of his father. He was buried in Loughgall, County Armagh.

== Arms ==
Coat of arms of Sir William Verner, 2nd Baronet

Crest
A boar's head as in the arms.
Escutcheon
Argent on a fess Sable between three boars' heads of the second fretty Or a trefoil slipped of the last.
Motto
Pro Christo Et Patria

== See also ==
- Verner baronets

Parliament of the United Kingdom
Preceded by Sir James Stronge, Bt; Sir William Verner, Bt	Member of Parliament for County Armagh; 1868 – 1873; With: Sir James Stronge, Bt	Succeeded by Sir James Stronge, Bt; Edward Wingfield Verner
Baronetage of the United Kingdom
Preceded by William Verner	Baronet of Verner's Bridge; 1871–1873	Succeeded by William Edward Hercules Verner
