= Barry baronets of the City of Dublin (1775) =

Extinct baronetcy

The Barry baronetcy, of the City of Dublin, was created in the Baronetage of Ireland on 1 August 1775 for the prominent Irish physician Edward Barry. He was member of the Irish Parliament for Charleville from 1743 to 1760.

The title descended from father to son until the death the 3rd Baronet, who died unmarried. He was succeeded by his younger brother the 4th Baronet, who also died unmarried and was succeeded by his first cousin. The 5th Baronet was the son of the Rev. John Barry, younger son of the 1st Baronet. Three of his sons then succeeded to the title.

The baronetcy became either extinct or dormant on the death of the 8th Baronet, circa 1895.

== Barry baronets, of the City of Dublin (1775) ==
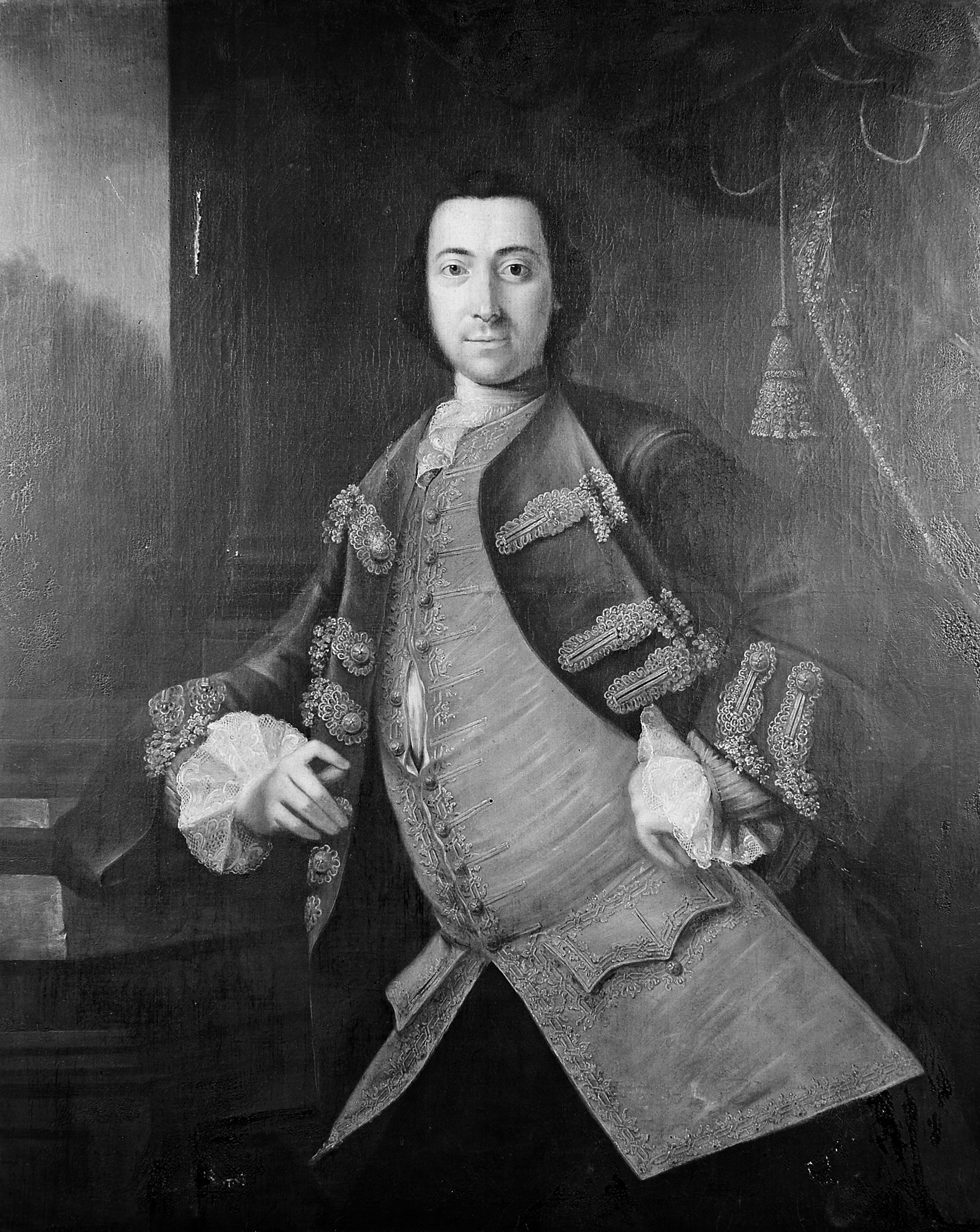
A portrait of Sir Nathaniel Barry, 2nd Baronet

- Sir Edward Barry, 1st Baronet (1698–1776)
- Sir Nathaniel Barry, 2nd Baronet (c. 1725–1785)
- Sir Edward Barry, 3rd Baronet (c. 1760–c. 1820)
- Sir Walter Barry, 4th Baronet (died c. 1827)
- Sir Edward Barry, 5th Baronet (died 1836)
- Sir Edward Barry, 6th Baronet (died c. 1845)
- Sir John Barry, 7th Baronet (died 1891)
- Sir James Barry, 8th Baronet (died c. 1895)
