= Thomas Longmore =

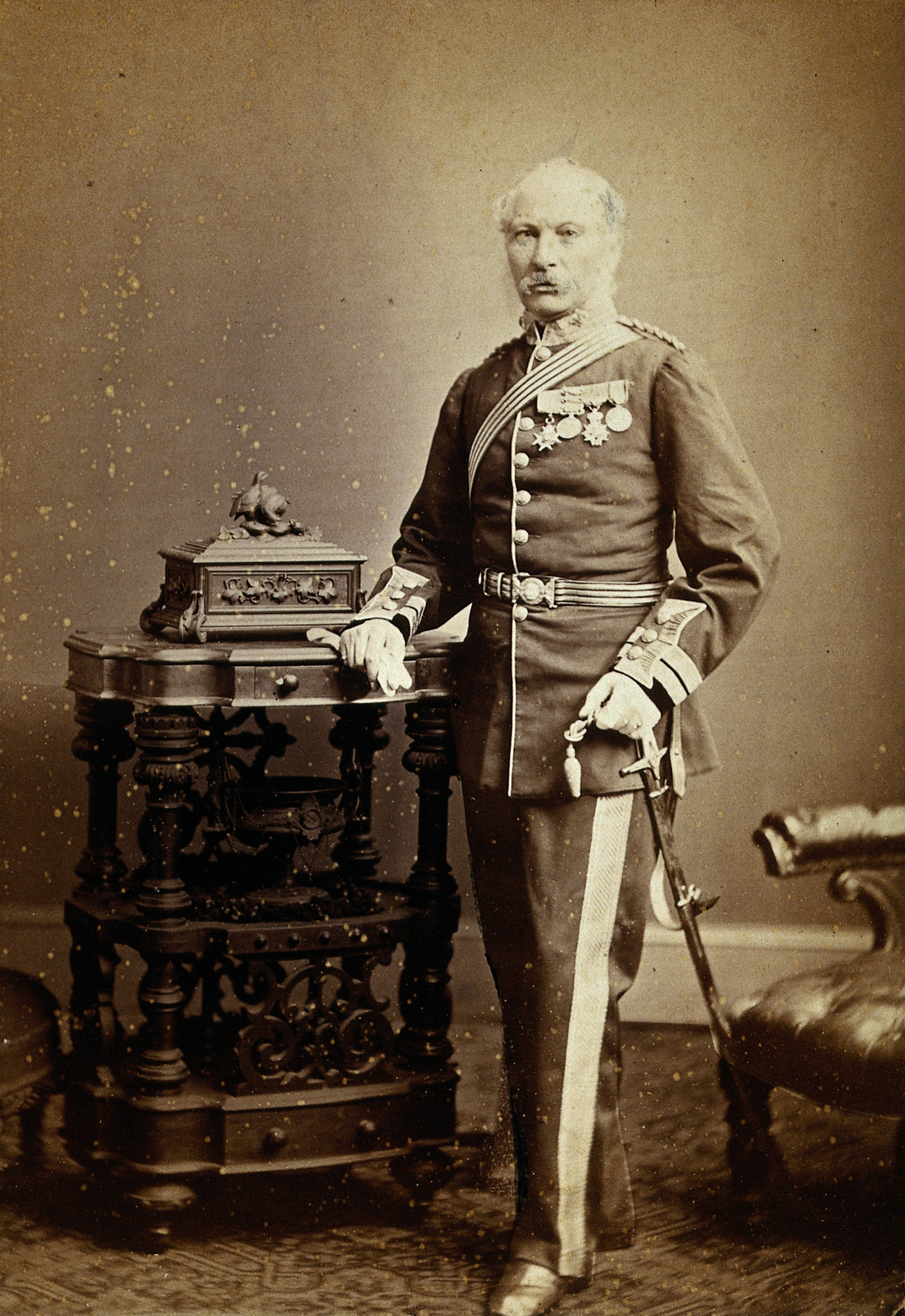
Thomas Longmore, 1877 photograph

Sir Thomas Longmore CB (10 October 1816 – 30 September 1895) was Surgeon-General and professor of military surgery at the Army Medical School at Netley Hospital. Prior to this appointment, he had a long and distinguished career as a military doctor and surgeon, notably serving during every major engagement of the Crimean War, even while suffering from frostbite.

He wrote numerous reports, manuals and treatises on several topics, such as the development of osteomyelitis following gunshot wounds.

He was a Fellow of the Royal College of Surgeons of England.

He was knighted in 1886.

His papers are part of the Wellcome Collection's Royal Army Medical Corps Muniments Collection.
