= Sir Richard Wallace, 1st Baronet =

British art collector (1818–1890)

Sir Richard Wallace
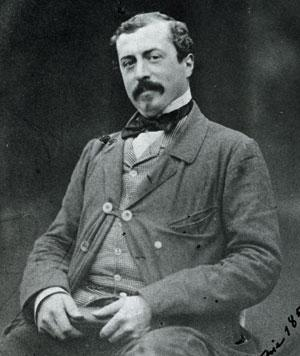

Member of Parliament for Lisburn
- In office 19 February 1873 – 1885
- Preceded by: Edward Wingfield Verner
- Succeeded by: constituency abolished

Personal details
- Born: 21 June 1818 London, United Kingdom of Great Britain and Ireland
- Died: 1 July 1890 (aged 72) Abbeville, France
- Party: Conservative

Sir Richard Wallace, 1st Baronet (21 June 1818 – 20 July 1890) was a British aristocrat, art collector and Francophile. Based on the Return of Owners of Land 1873, he was the 24th richest man in the United Kingdom and the 73rd largest landowner, holding in total 72,307 acres (292.62 km^{2}) in England and Ireland, with a total annual value of £86,737. In addition he had valuable property in Paris and one of the greatest private art collections in the world, part of which, now known as the Wallace Collection, was donated to the UK Government by his widow, in accordance with his wishes.

== Origins and youth ==
Richard is believed to have been the illegitimate son of Richard Seymour-Conway, 4th Marquess of Hertford (1800–1870). He was born in London on 26 July 1818, to a certain Agnes Jackson, who according to Burns (2008) was in reality Mrs Agnes Bickley, the wife of Samuel Bickley, an insurance underwriter and member of Lloyd's of London, and a daughter of Sir Thomas Dunlop Wallace, 5th Baronet (1750–1835), of Craigie Castle, Ayrshire, born "Thomas Dunlop", who had adopted the additional name and style of baronet on inheriting the Craigie estate of his grandfather Sir Thomas Wallace, 4th Baronet. It is unclear why his mother had adopted the surname Jackson, as she remained married to Samuel Bickley at the time of Richard's birth and bore Samuel legitimate children both before and after the birth.

Richard's natural father, the 4th Marquess of Hertford, after whom he supposedly gained his first name, would have been 18 years old at his birth, and is supposed by Burns (2008) to have met Agnes in Brighton whilst serving in the 10th Hussars Regiment. He never married and Richard was his only offspring.

However, it was previously thought possible that he was the uterine half-brother of the 4th Marquess, being a son by father unknown of Maria Emilia Fagnani, Marchioness of Hertford (1771–1856) ("Mie-Mie"), the estranged wife of Francis Charles Seymour-Conway, 3rd Marquess of Hertford (1777–1842) and mother of the 4th Marquess. Later in life, after 1870 during his court case concerning his contested inheritance from the 4th Marquess, Richard declined the opportunity to put his origins on public record, stating merely that "he had been brought from London to Paris in 1825 aged 7 with his nurse". It is however recorded in surviving correspondence that the 4th Marquess had given his second cousin Francis Seymour, 5th Marquess of Hertford "the most solemn assurance that he was not Mr. Wallace's father." It is possible that Wallace himself did not know the truth of the matter. However, he did at some point discover that his mother's maiden name was Wallace, and on 21 April 1842, aged 24, he was baptised in the Anglican Church in the Rue d'Aguesseau in Paris under the surname Wallace, with the certificate of baptism recording simply that the name of his parents was Wallace. Thenceforth he was known as Richard Wallace.

=== Move to France ===
In 1825, aged seven and known as "Richard Jackson", his mother Agnes Jackson left him in Paris under the care and education of "Mie-Mie", the mother of the 4th Marquess, who lived at 1 Rue Taitbout, 50 metres from the house of her son at 2 Rue Laffitte. Richard lived with Mie-Mie for the next 17 years until 1842 (two years after he had fathered his own son by his mistress) and the two developed a close bond. The 4th Marquess mentioned in his will the kindness that Richard had shown to his mother. He referred to her as "Aunt" and she to him as "Dear Nephew". This close relationship may have been sealed by the fact that both were illegitimate, Mie-Mie being the natural daughter of William Douglas, 4th Duke of Queensberry by his Italian mistress. "They both suffered the stigma of illegitimacy, at a time when bloodlines in humans were as important as in horses. They both had to endure whispered gossip the moment they turned their backs, and the trail of scandal wherever they went" (Fairweather, 2021). Long after her death Wallace erected a monument to Mie-Mie in Sudbourne Church (the only one there to a Hertford in 120 years of residence) in the form of the stained-glass east window depicting Mary Magdalene, the prostitute who washed Jesus's feet with oil but was also the first person to witness the Resurrection, which Fairweather (2021) suspected to be "an intentional reference to Mie-Mie's circumstances".

== Career ==
Most of his youth and early manhood were spent in Paris, "where as Monsieur Richard he became a well-known figure in French society and among those who devoted themselves to matters of art". He was appointed by the 4th Marquess as his secretary and agent, on a salary of £500, later raised to £1,000. In this capacity he became expert in assessing, valuing and buying works for the famous collector. Before he was forty he had made his own large collection including objets d'art, bronzes, ivories and miniatures, which he sold profitably in Paris in 1857, in order to pay off debts.

== Inheritance ==
In 1870 his father the 4th Marquess died without legitimate issue, and the titles and entailed estates, including Ragley Hall in Warwickshire and Sudbourne, passed under an entail to his second cousin, Francis Seymour who became the 5th Marquess. However Wallace inherited his father's unentailed estates and extensive collection of European art.

=== Lisburn, County Antrim, Ireland ===
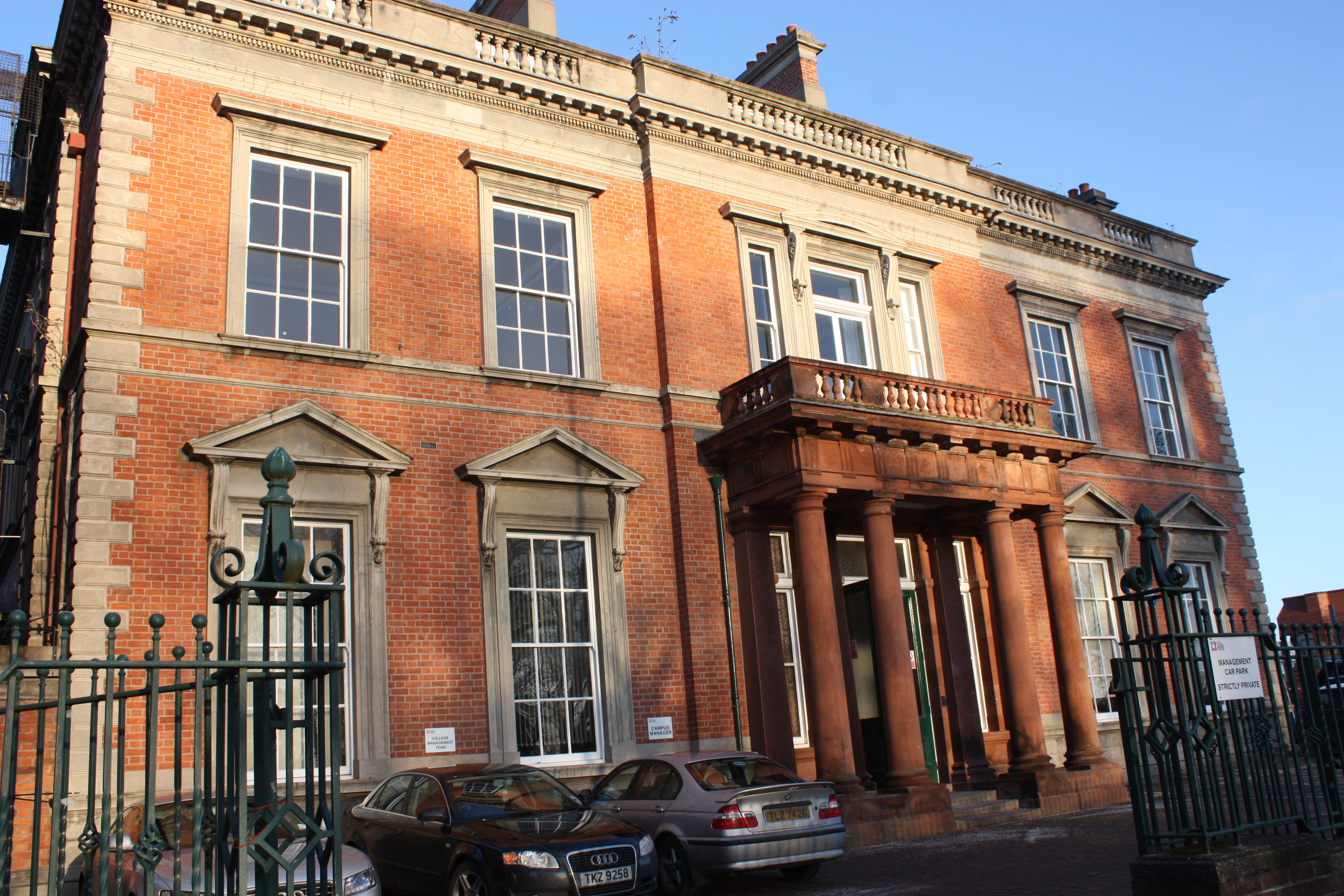
Wallace House, Lisburn, built by Wallace as his residence, and for his son, but little used

His vast estate in Lisburn, Northern Ireland, extending to over 50,000 acres (200 km^{2}), produced an annual income of £50,000 (£7 million in 2022). The area was the centre of the flax and linen industry. When Wallace visited it for the first time after his inheritance, accompanied by his wife and son, he was greeted by a crowd of 20,000 people and was welcomed in an elaborate series of ceremonies by the chief citizens. Even though at that time Lisburn had ceased to be the pocket borough it had been under the Hertford family before the Reform Act 1832, beginning in 1873 Wallace was returned unopposed three times to Westminster as a Conservative Member of Parliament. During his eleven years in the House of Commons, Hansard records but one significant intervention: Wallace spoke in support of an amendment to the Land Law (Ireland) Bill of 1881 defending, in the sale of tenancies, the pre-emptive rights of the landlord.

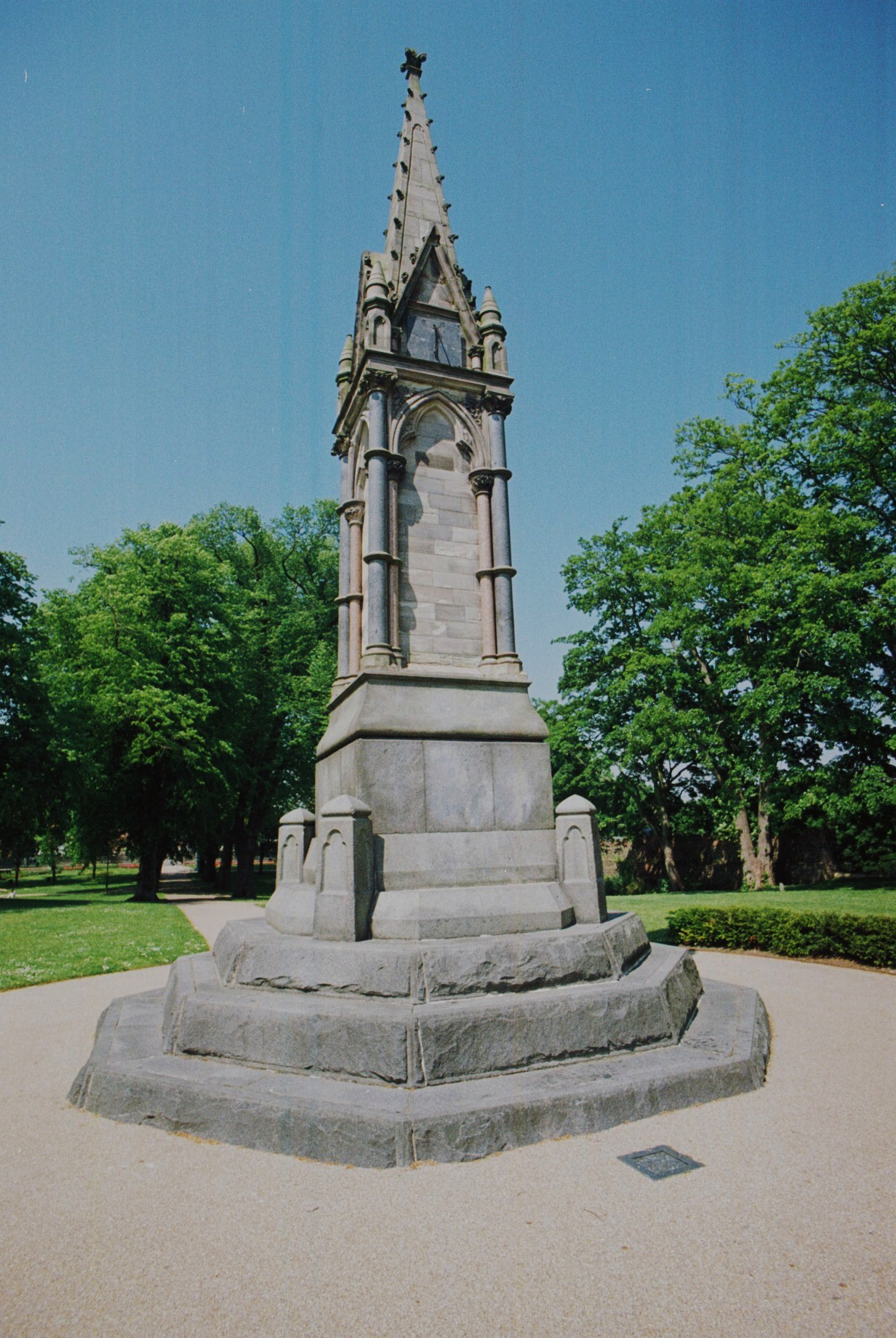
The Wallace Memorial, Castle Park, Lisburn, erected in 1892

Wallace built a grand residence in the Lisburn for himself, called Wallace House, more exactly intended for his son whom he intended to establish there to perform the functions of a great landlord, designed by the same architect who had remodelled Hertford House. He made many large charitable donations to the town, and was reputedly admired by the inhabitants. After his death various monuments were erected in his memory including two stained glass windows in Lisburn Cathedral, on the south wall of the chancel and on the south wall of the nave, one financed by public subscription, the other by Lady Wallace. In "grateful recognition of his generous interest in the prosperity of the town", in 1892 residents of the town erected a memorial in Castle Gardens. The Wallace Memorial comprises a 40 foot high stone and marble "square-plan tower with a steep crocketed spire topped with a poppy head finial, the front gable bearing a date and coat of arms, niches on each façade, one bearing a bust of the subject above an inscribed tablet, and on a three-stepped octagonal base". It is inscribed:

To perpetuate the memory of one whose delight was to do good and in grateful recollection of his generous interest in the prosperity of this town of which it possesses so many proofs this monument is erected to Sir Richard Wallace, Bart., KGI, sometime MP for the Borough of Lisburn, by the inhabitants of the town and neighbourhood Obiit Jul. XX, MDCCCXC.

His bequests to the town included the Wallace Park and the Wallace High School. His town house on Castle Street is now used as offices by the South Eastern Regional College.

=== Sudbourne ===
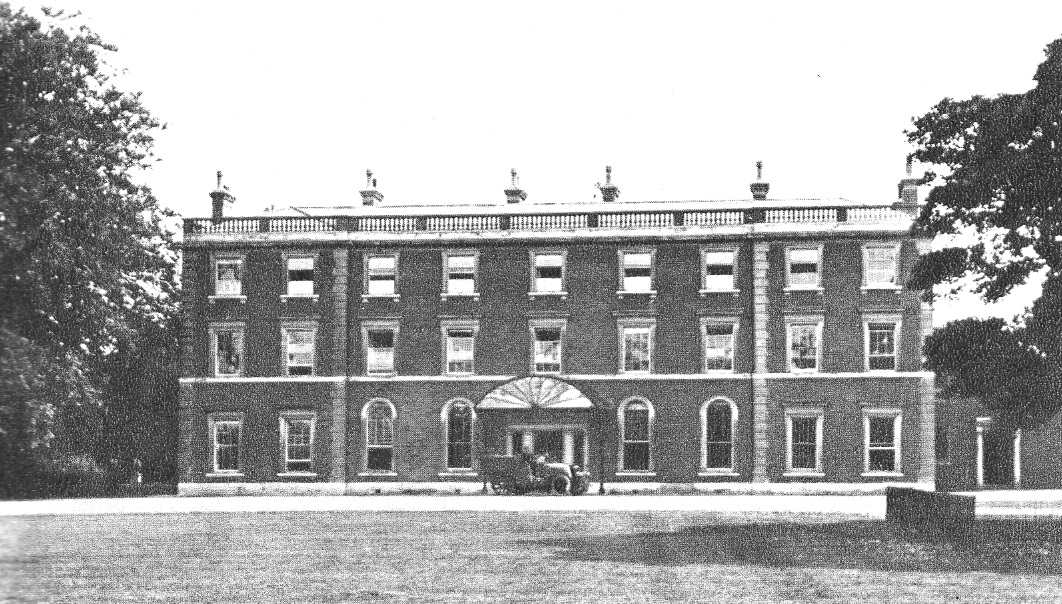
Sudbourne Hall photographed circa 1900, as built in 1784 by Francis Seymour-Conway, 1st Marquess of Hertford, to the design of the architect James Wyatt. Demolished in 1953.

Wallace repurchased Sudbourne from the 5th Marquess, for £298,000. It was a notable sporting estate of about 12,000 acres (49 km^{2}), which became his English country seat and where he held lavish shooting parties, guests at which included the Prince of Wales. He employed 24 liveried gamekeepers and "a small army of domestic servants" to cater for his shooting guests. He commissioned three large oil paintings by the French artist Alfred Charles Ferdinand Decaen, depicting his shooting parties (On Sudbourne Hill (1874); Shooting Luncheon at the Great Wood Sudbourne (1876); Battue de perdreaux dans la comté de Suffolk (1880)), now displayed in Orford Town Hall. He was Honorary President of Ipswich Museum in Suffolk from 1874 until his death. In 1875 he built a model farm at nearby Chillesford Lodge on the estate, which survives today, displaying on some of the buildings his heraldic crest, also visible on several other houses and buildings erected by him on the estate. In 1883 he won a silver medal at the Smithfield Show as breeder of the best "Single Pig" in class LXXXVI. During 1879–82 he restored Sudbourne Church, and presented it with new furnishings.

In 1877 Wallace appointed as Rector of Sudbourne and Orford parish churches Rev. Edward Maude Scott, the brother of his secretary and eventual heir Sir John Murray Scott, 1st Baronet. The latter is buried in Orford Churchyard beneath a tall stone cross within iron railings. Rev. Scott was instrumental in restoring St Bartholomew's Church in Orford between 1894 and 1901. In 1884 Wallace sold Sudbourne to the banker Arthur Heywood, and returned to Paris, having become disappointed in his ambition to found his own aristocratic dynasty due to his son's refusal to live in England and Queen Victoria's refusal to allow the latter to inherit his baronetcy, due to illegitimacy.

=== Château de Bagatelle ===
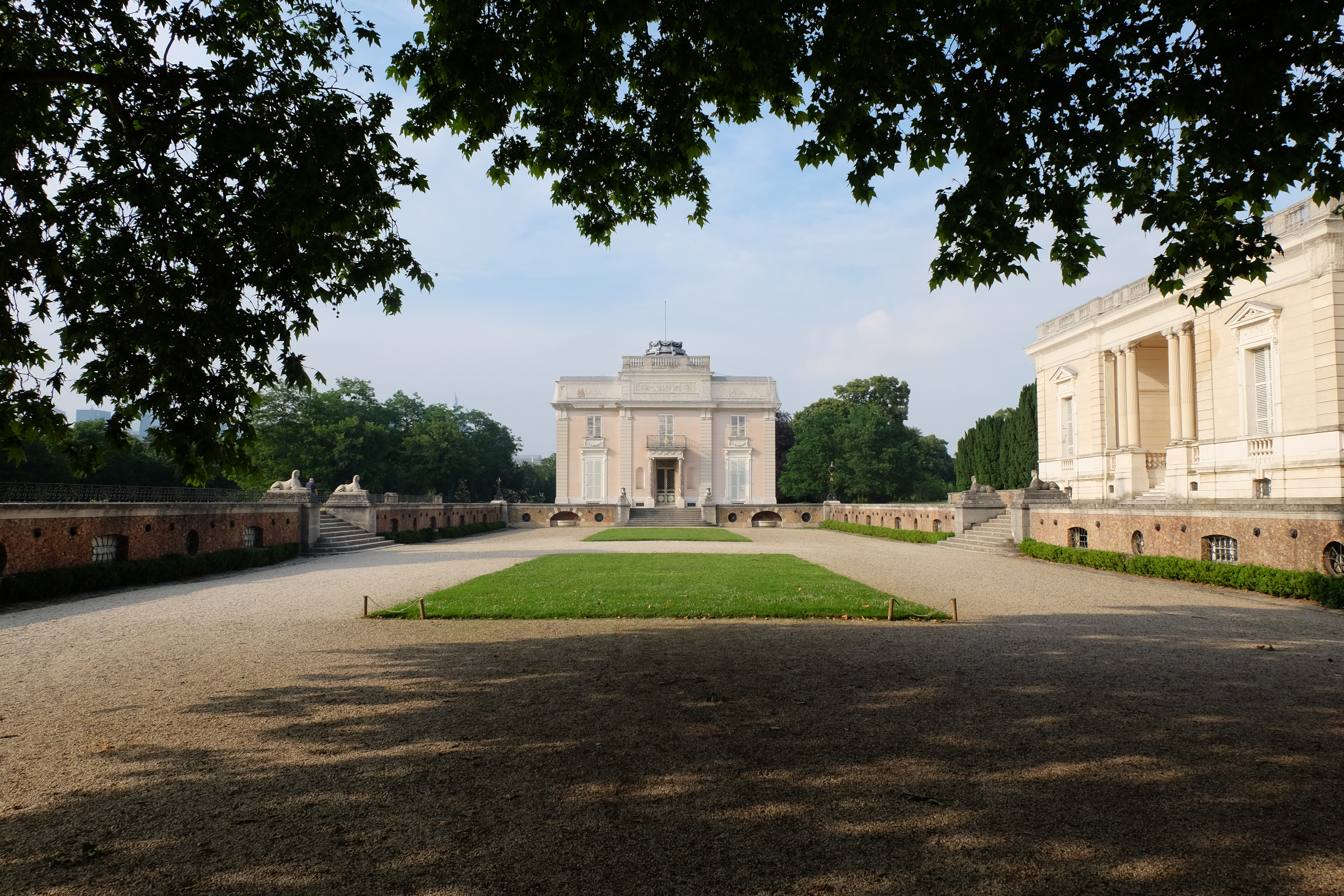
Château de Bagatelle

He also inherited the Château de Bagatelle, Neuilly-sur-Seine, with its 60-acre (0.24 km^{2}) garden in the Bois de Boulogne, Paris, which his widow bequeathed, together with Hertford House in London and 2 Rue Laffitte, to Sir John Edward Arthur Murray Scott, 1st Baronet (1847–1912) "of Connaught Place", London. Scott was the eldest son of Dr. John Scott, a physician at Boulogne-sur-Seine, and had been appointed as Wallace's secretary, in which capacity he had helped with the charity work and with Wallace's return to England, together with his art collection, after the Siege of Paris. Scott remained as the principal advisor to Lady Wallace in her widowhood. In Scott's time it is described by Vita Sackville-West in Pepita (1937).

=== 2 Rue Laffitte, Paris ===
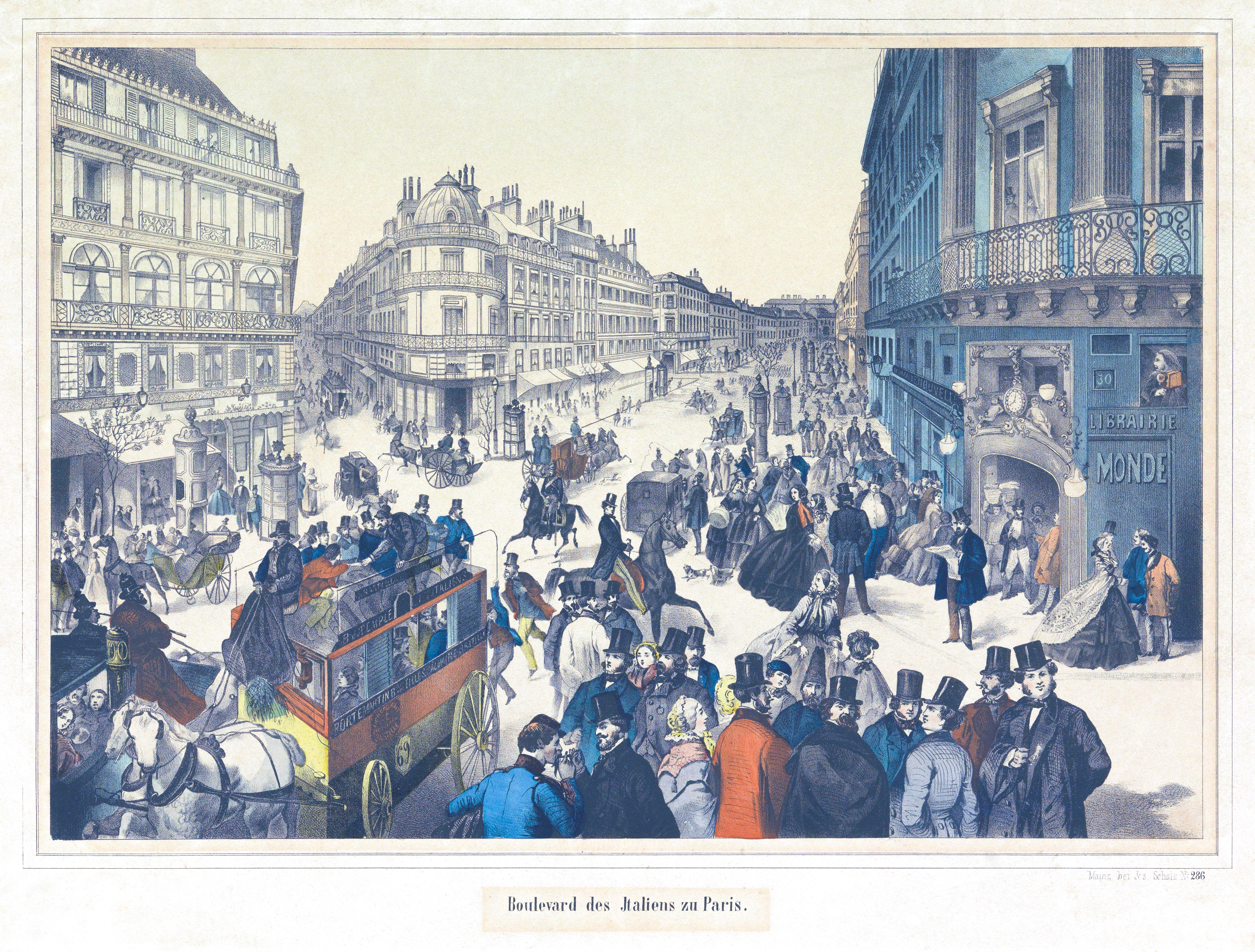
Centre, corner house with full-height bowed-projection at the corner, 2 Rue Laffitte, Paris, residence of the 4th Marquess of Hertford and then of Sir Richard Wallace. Boulevard des Italiens zu Paris, by Jos. Scholz, painted 1829/80. Rijksmuseum.

2 Rue Laffitte, Paris, formerly the hôtel d'Aubeterre or townhouse of the Aubeterre family, with a full-height bowed-projection at the corner, was situated on the corner of Rue Laffitte and the Boulevard des Italiens. It faced on the other side of the Rue Laffitte the famous Restaurant de la Maison-d'Or. The street contained the shops of several art dealers. It was purchased by the 4th Marquess of Hertford, when his mother vacated it to live at 1 rue Taitbout, the next street 50 metres to the west. After Wallace's death it was eventually inherited by his secretary Sir John Murray Scott, during whose ownership the house and contents are described by Vita Sackville-West in Pepita, her biography of her mother Lady Sackville (Scott's mistress), who ultimately inherited the contents, which she sold in 1914 to the dealer Jacques Seligmann for £270,000 (£35 million in 2022) and of which the Wallace Collection was therefore deprived:

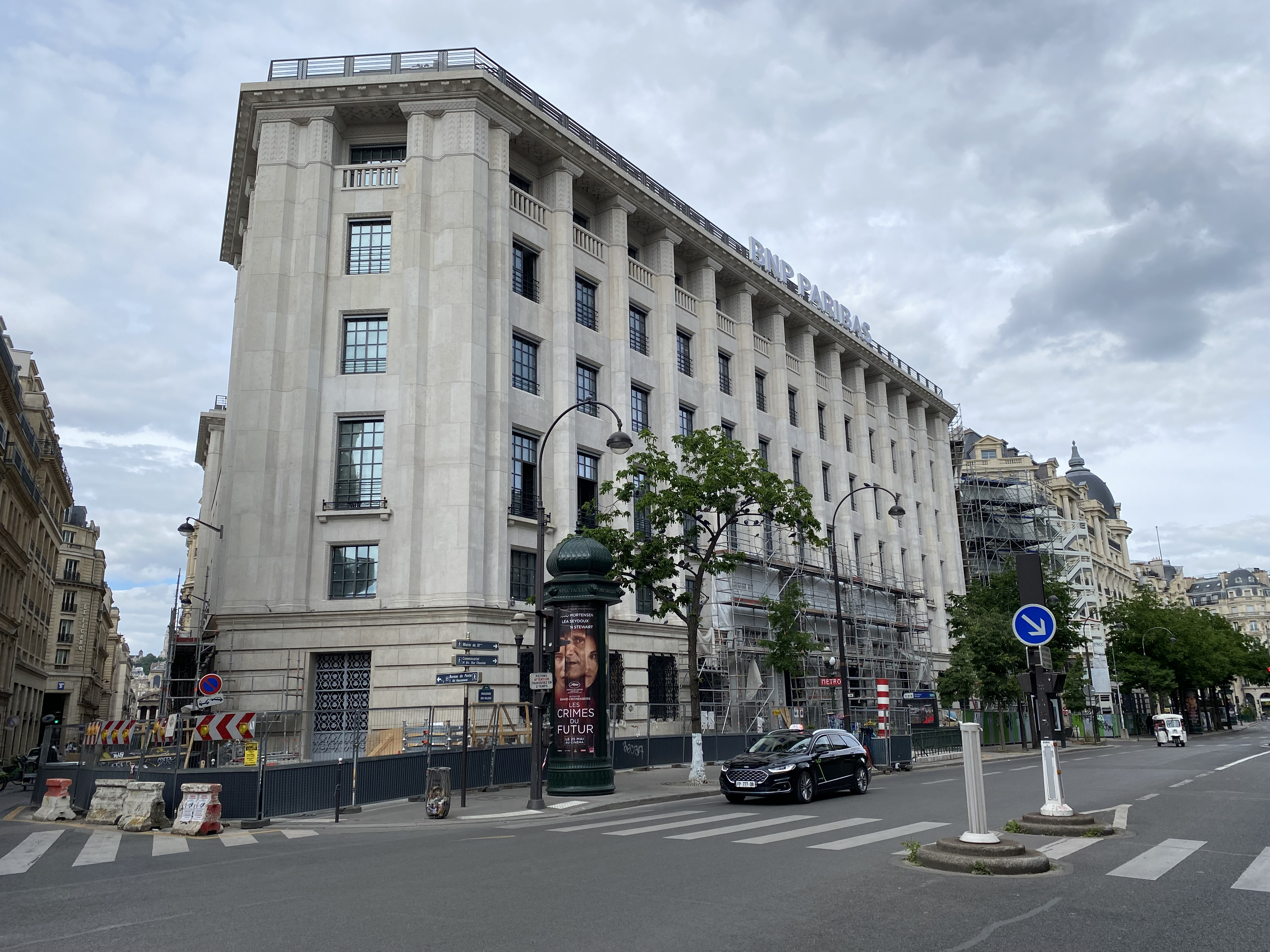
The same view in 2022 of the site of the former Hertford-Wallace-Scott residence, now the site of the headquarters building of BNP Paribas bank, "16 Boulevard des Italiens"

"A vast apartment on the first floor turning the corner of the Boulevard des Italiens and the Rue Laffitte with twenty windows opening on either street was in itself a treasure-house which brought visitors from every part of Europe. I shall never forget the enchantment of that house. From the moment one had pulled the string and the big door had swung open admitting one to the interior courtyard where grooms in wooden clogs seemed perpetually to be washing carriages; the whole house belonged to him though he reserved only the first floor for himself .... the real glory of the house lay in the main apartment—room after room opened one into the other so that standing in the middle one could look down a vista of shining brown parquet floors at ivory-coloured boisieries on either side. Here indeed one had the 18th century illusion at its height. All around silent and sumptuous stood the priceless furniture of the Wallace Collection."

== Siege of Paris and the Wallace fountains ==
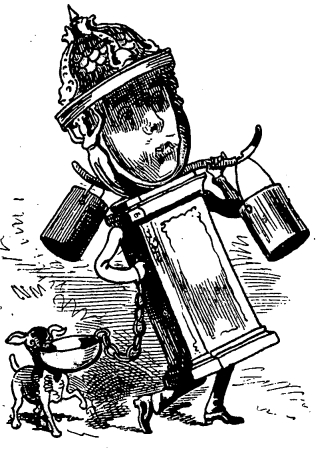
Richard Wallace caricatured as a Parisian Wallace fountain by Georges Lafosse published in Le Trombinoscope

Wallace achieved fame during the Siege of Paris for notable acts of charity. Rather than take refuge on one of his palatial estates, he had remained in his Parisian villa from where, at his own expense, he organized two field hospitals (or ambulances as they were then called); one to serve French wounded, and the second for the benefit of sick and destitute Britons.

By the end of the siege, Wallace is estimated to have privately contributed as much as 2.5 million (1870) francs to the needy of Paris. The last balloon to leave Paris before its capitulation was named in recognition of his services, as was a Paris boulevard, and he was made a chevalier de la Légion d'Honneur.

In 1872, Wallace financed the reconstruction of the war-damaged Protestant Temple in Neuilly-sur-Seine. He also donated a total of 70 drinking fountains to the city. As a result of the siege and of the violent suppression of the Paris Commune that followed, many aqueducts had been destroyed, obliging the poor to draw on the polluted waters of the Seine. The still extant, cast-iron, Wallace fountains are of a renaissance design executed by the sculptor Charles-Auguste Lebourg. Two donated by Wallace are to be found in Lisburn (one in Castle Gardens and one in Wallace Park) and replicas exist at various locations worldwide.

== Marriage ==
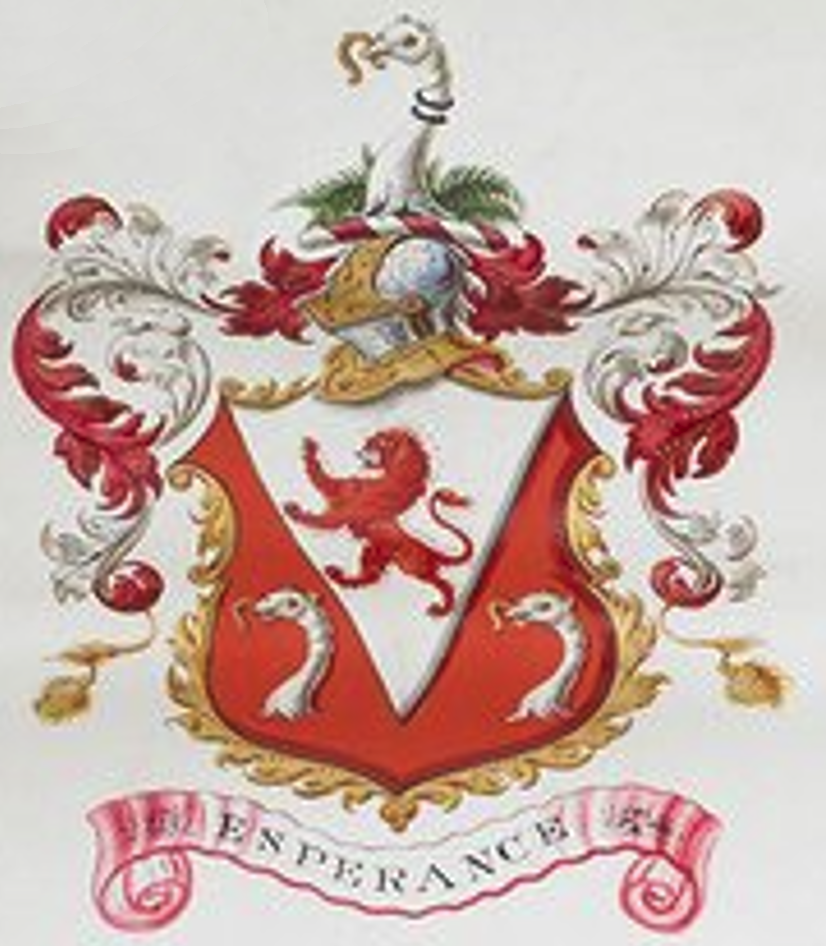
Arms of Sir Richard Wallace, granted 1871.

On 15 February 1871, six months after the death of the 4th Marquess and having received his paternal inheritance, he married his long-term mistress Amélie Julie Charlotte Castelnau (1819–1897). He had met her in his youth when she was working as a dressmaker or sales-assistant in a perfume shop. She was the illegitimate daughter of Bernard Castelnau, said by some sources to have been "a French officer" and by others "a 36-year-old homme de confiance (factotum)" with her mother being an "ouvrière en linge (linen maid)".

On 24 November 1871, six months after the marriage, Wallace was created a baronet, "of Hertford House, London", in recognition of his assistance to English ex-patriots during the Siege of Paris, and the couple moved to the house in London. Amélie, now Lady Wallace, spoke no English, did not enjoy social events and showed little interest in the fine arts. Baron Ferdinand de Rothschild wrote of her that "she dragged [Wallace] down to her level, clogged his whole future, and marred all his prospects".

Via Mie-Mie, wife of the 3rd Marquess and illegitimate daughter of the 4th Duke of Queensberry, in 1881 the Hertfords inherited further property, the Queensbury Estate, at Newmarket, Suffolk.

== Illegitimate Issue ==
Thirty years before their marriage Wallace had an illegitimate son by Amélie, baptised Georges Henry Edmond Castelnau (1840–1887). In 1871, aged 31, Wallace officially recognised him as his son under the name "Edmond Richard Wallace". But permanently illegitimate under English law (but not under French law) he was unable to inherit his father's baronetcy. He served in the French army during the Franco-Prussian War, under General Joseph Vinoy, and was made, like his father, a chevalier de la Légion d'Honneur. Bohemian by nature, he was unwilling to conform to Wallace's wish for him to become an English gentleman and to reside on the Lisburn estate in Ireland. Rather than marrying a suitable English lady, Edmund felt loyalty to his mistress Suzanne Amélie Gall and to his four illegitimate children in France causing a split with Wallace that was unresolved at the time of his early death in 1887, aged 47. The three grandsons were to have distinguished careers in the French military. Under the name Lucy Arbell, the granddaughter, Georgette Wallace (1878–1947), became a celebrated opera singer.

== Return to France ==
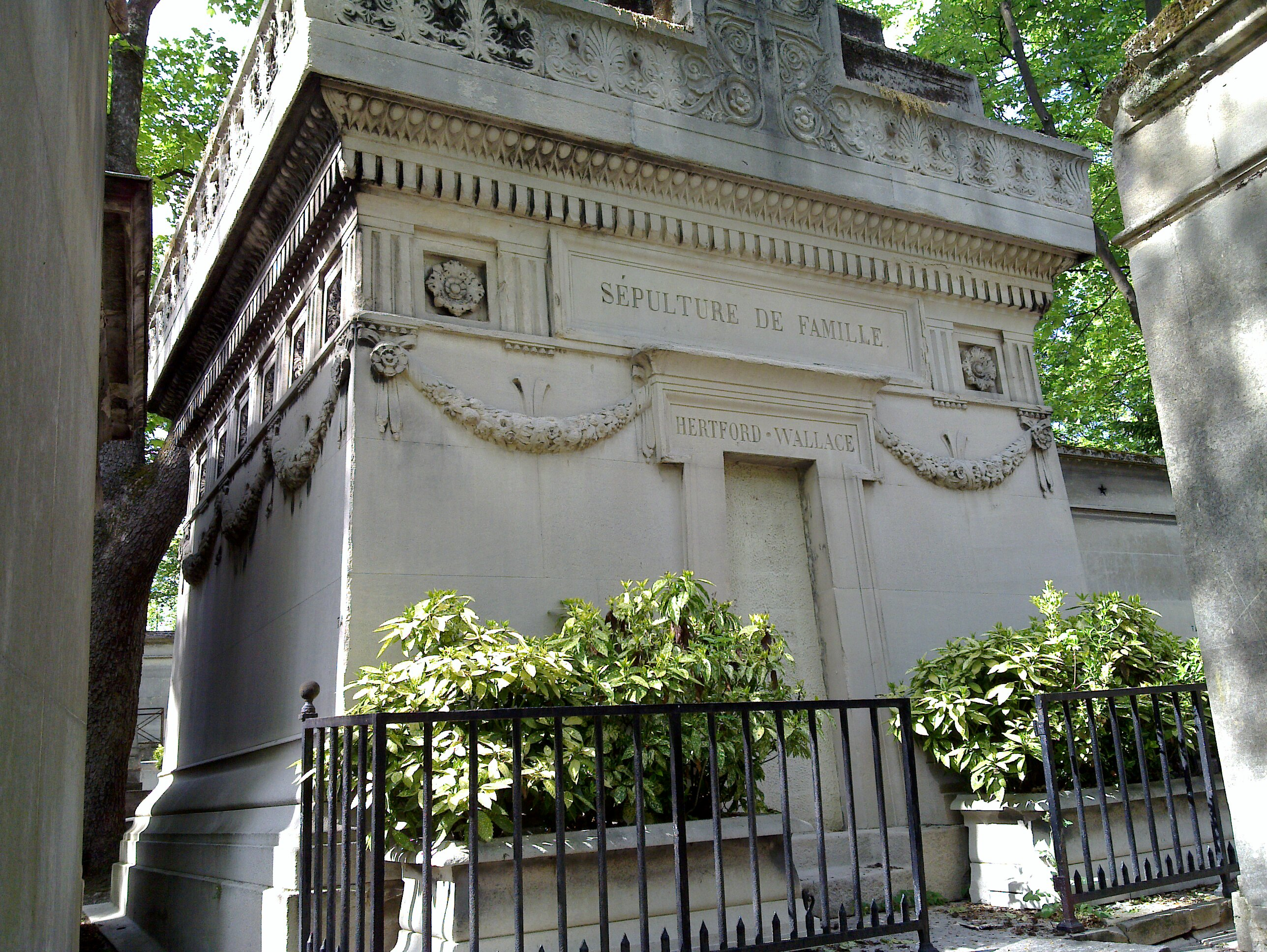
Hertford-Wallace mausoleum in the Père Lachaise Cemetery in Paris

Following the refusal of Queen Victoria to allow him a special remainder for his baronetcy to descend to his illegitimate son, and the estrangement of the latter, Wallace's dream of creating his own English dynasty crumbled, and he returned to France to live in retirement at the Bagatelle. He attempted to plan the donation of his collection to the British government, but his poor health and decreasing interest in business matters led to no progress. His wife remained in England at Hertford House, where she lived with their secretary John Murray Scott, who became to her as an adopted son.

Wallace died at the Château de Bagatelle, at the age of 72, on 20 July 1890. He body was interred in the Hertford family's mausoleum in the Père Lachaise Cemetery in Paris.

== Wallace Collection and archives ==
Wallace expanded the art collection built by his grandfather and father, the 3rd and 4th Marquesses of Hertford, mainly with additions of mediaeval and Renaissance objects and European arms and armour. The Wallace Collection remains today in its essential character the product of the 4th Marquess, "one of the greatest collectors of the nineteenth century", whom Wallace, as his secretary and agent for many years, assisted in its management. Wallace's widow, to whom he bequeathed all his property, in turn bequeathed the Wallace Collection to the nation in 1897, as her husband had wished, and with the encouragement of John Murray Scott. The bequest comprised only the works of art on the ground and first floors of Hertford House, but everything else (the lease of Hertford House, the Rue Laffitte house, the Château de Bagatelle in Paris, and the Lisburn estate in Ireland) was bequeathed by Lady Wallace to John Murray Scott. The Collection is now located in Hertford House in Manchester Square, London, Wallace's townhouse, which the Government purchased from Sir John Murray Scott.

A number of letters written to Wallace by members of the British royal family are held at the Cadbury Research Library (University of Birmingham), along with letters written to his secretary John Murray Scott.

From 20 June 2018 - 6 January 2019, the Wallace Collection exhibited Sir Richard Wallace: The Collector in honor of his 200^{th} birthday; the exhibit "highlighted for the first time Sir Richard’s personal contributions to the Collection we know today, focusing on the diverse and idiosyncratic works of art he acquired and his considerable philanthropic legacy." In connection with the exhibit, a biography titled Sir Richard Wallace: Connoisseur, Collector and Philanthropist was written by Wallace Collection curator Suzanne Higgott (ISBN 978-0-995-48613-3).

Parliament of the United Kingdom
Preceded by Edward Wingfield Verner	Member of Parliament for Lisburn; 1873 – 1885	constituency abolished
Baronetage of the United Kingdom
New creation	Baronet (of Hertford House); 1871–1890	Extinct
