= 1873 County Armagh by-election =

UK Parliamentary by-election

The 1873 Armagh County by-election was held on 15 February 1873. The by-election was held due to the death of the incumbent Conservative MP, Sir William Verner. It was won by the unopposed Conservative candidate Edward Wingfield Verner.
