= List of Ulster Unionist Party MPs =

This is a list of Ulster Unionist Party MPs. It includes all members of Parliament elected to the British House of Commons representing the Ulster Unionist Party or its forerunner, the Irish Unionist Party, since 1918. Members of the European Parliament, the Northern Ireland House of Commons or the Northern Ireland Assembly are not listed.

== MPs elected since 1918 ==
Member	Constituency	Years served
W. E. D. Allen	Belfast West	1929–1931 (Note: Defected to the New Party.)
William Allen	North Armagh; Armagh	1917–1922; 1922–1948
Hugh Anderson	North Londonderry	1918–1919
Edward Archdale	North Fermanagh	1916–1922
C. W. Armstrong	Armagh	1954–1959
Henry Armstrong	Mid Armagh	1921–1922
Hugh T. Barrie	North Londonderry	1919–1922
Charles Beattie	Mid Ulster	1955–1956
Roy Beggs	East Antrim	1983–2005
Robert Bradford	Belfast South	1977–1981 (Note: Elected in 1974 for the Vanguard Unionist Progressive Party.)
Thomas Watters Brown	North Down	1918–1922
Alexander Browne	Belfast West	1931–1943
David Burnside	South Antrim	2001–2005
David Campbell	Belfast South	1952–1963
Edward Carson	Dublin University; Belfast Duncairn	1892–1918; 1918–1921
John Carson	Belfast North	Feb 1974–1979
Robin Vane-Tempest-Stewart	Down	1931–1945
Robert Chichester	South Londonderry	1921–1922
Robin Chichester-Clark	Londonderry	1955–Feb 1974
Henry Clark	North Antrim	1959–1970
Thomas Loftus Cole	Belfast East	1945–1950
William Coote	South Tyrone	1916–1922
James Craig	East Down; Mid Down	1906–1918; 1918–1921
William Craig	Belfast East	1977–1979
Knox Cunningham	South Antrim	1955–1970
George Currie	North Down	1955–1970
Charles Craig	South Antrim	1903–1922
Herbert Dixon	Belfast Pottinger; Belfast East	1918–1922; 1922–1940
Maurice Dockrell	Dublin Rathmines	1918–1922
Jeffrey Donaldson	Lagan Valley	1997–2003 (Note: Defected to the Democratic Unionist Party.)
Tom Elliott	Fermanagh and South Tyrone	2015–2017
Charles Falls	Fermanagh and Tyrone	1924–1929
Patricia Ford	North Down	1953–1955
George Forrest	Mid Ulster	1956–1969 (Note: Elected in 1956 as an Independent Unionist.)
Clifford Forsythe	South Antrim	1983–2000
Conolly Gage	Belfast South	1945–1952
Robert Grosvenor	Fermanagh and South Tyrone	1955–1964
James Hamilton	Fermanagh and South Tyrone	1964–1970
Richard Harden	Armagh	1948–1954
Henry Harland	Belfast East	1940–1945
Hugh Hayes	West Down	1922–1922
Denis Henry	South Londonderry	1916–1921
Sylvia Hermon	North Down	2001–2010 (Note: Left the party on 25 March 2010 to become an Independent Unionist.)
H. Montgomery Hyde	Belfast North	1950–1959
William Jellett	Dublin University	1919–1922
Peter Kerr-Smiley	North Antrim	Jan 1910–1922
James Kilfedder	Belfast West; North Down	1964–1966 (Note: Left the party to become an Independent Unionist before forming the Ulster Popular Unionist Party.); 1970–1977
Danny Kinahan	South Antrim	2015–2017
William Arthur Lindsay	Belfast South; Belfast Cromac	1917–1918; 1918–1922
James Little	Down	1939–1945 (Note: Resigned from the party at the 1945 general election in protest at being subject to a reselection due to the retirement of Viscount Castlereagh, the other Ulster Unionist MP for the two member Down constituency and held his seat as an Independent Ulster Unionist.)
James Lonsdale	Mid Armagh	1918–1921
R. J. Lynn	Belfast Woodvale; Belfast West	1918–1922; 1922–1929
Robert McCalmont	East Antrim	1913–1919
Thomas McConnell	Belfast Duncairn; Belfast North	1921–1922; 1922–1929
Harold McCusker	Armagh; Upper Bann	1974–1983; 1983–1990
Alan McKibbin	Belfast East	1950–1959
Patricia McLaughlin	Belfast West	1955–1964
J. G. MacManaway	Belfast West	1950
Stanley McMaster	Belfast East	1959–1974
Malcolm Macnaghten	North Londonderry; Londonderry	1922; 1922–1929
John Maginnis	Armagh	1959–1974
Ken Maginnis	Fermanagh and South Tyrone	1983–2001
Stratton Mills	Belfast North	1959–1972 (Note: Refused to follow the other Ulster Unionists in resigning the Conservative whip; later joined the Alliance Party of Northern Ireland.)
Thomas Moles	Belfast Ormeau; Belfast South	1918–1922; 1922–1929
James Molyneaux	South Antrim; Lagan Valley	1970–1983; 1983–1997
C. H. Mullan	Down	1946–1950
William Neill	Belfast North	1945–1950
Jim Nicholson	Newry and Armagh	1983–1986
Hugh O'Neill	Mid Antrim; Antrim; North Antrim	1915–1922; 1922–1950; 1950–1952
Phelim O'Neill	North Antrim	1953–1959
Lawrence Orr	South Down	1950–1974
Sir William Pain	South Londonderry	1922
Rafton Pounder	Belfast South	1953–1974
Enoch Powell	South Down	1974–1987 (Note: Previously Conservative MP for Wolverhampton South West 1950–1974.)
James Pringle	Fermanagh and Tyrone	1922–1929
David Reid	East Down; Down	1918–1922; 1922–1939
Ronald Ross	Londonderry	1929–1951
William Ross	Londonderry; East Londonderry	1974–1983; 1983–2001
Arthur Samuels	Dublin University	1917–1919
Douglas Savory	Queen's University of Belfast; South Antrim	1940–1950; 1950–1955
Robert Sharman-Crawford	Mid Down	1921–1922
John Simms	North Down; Down	1922; 1922–1931
Thomas Sinclair	Queen's University of Belfast	1918–1940
Walter Smiles	Down; North Down	1945–1950; 1950–1953
Martin Smyth	Belfast South	1982–2005
Thomas Somerset	Belfast North	1929–1945
William Stewart	Belfast South	1929–1945
John Taylor	Strangford	1983–2001
Thomas Teevan	Belfast West	1950–1951
William Thompson	West Tyrone	1997–2001
David Trimble	Upper Bann	1990–2005
Cecil Walker	Belfast North	1983–2001
Thomas Browne Wallace	West Down	1921–1922
William Wellwood	Londonderry	1951–1955
Harry West	Fermanagh and South Tyrone	Feb–Oct 1974
William Whitla	Queen's University of Belfast	1918–1923
Daniel Martin Wilson	West Down	1918–1921
Henry Wilson	North Down	Feb–July 1922

== Graphical representation ==
Constituency	1922	1923	1924	29	1929	31	1931	1935	38	39	40	43	1945	46	48
Antrim (Two members)	Craig				McConnell							Campbell	Haughton		
Antrim (Two members)	O'Neill														
Armagh	Allen														Harden
Belfast East	Dixon										Harland		Cole		
Belfast North	McConnell				Somerset								Neill		
Londonderry	Macnaghten			Ross											
Queen's University of Belfast	Whitla	Sinclair									Savory				
Down (Two members)	Simms						Vane-Tempest-Stewart						Smiles		
Down (Two members)	Reid									Little				Mullan	
Belfast South	Moles				Stewart								Gage		
Belfast West	Lynn				Allen		Browne								
Fermanagh and Tyrone (Two members)			Pringle												
Fermanagh and Tyrone (Two members)			Falls												
No. of UUP MPs	11	11	13	13	11	10	11	11	10	10	10	9	9	10	10

Constituency	1950	51	1951	52	53	54	1955	57	59	1959	63	1964	1966	69	1970	72	Feb 74	Oct 74	77	78	1979	81
Antrim South	Savory						Cunningham								Molyneaux							
Armagh	Harden					Armstrong				Maginnis							McCusker					
Down South	Orr																	Powell				
Londonderry	Ross	Wellwood					Chichester-Clark										Ross					
Down North	Smiles				Ford		Currie								Kilfedder							
Belfast East	McKibbin								McMaster											Craig		
Belfast South	Gage			Campbell							Pounder								Bradford			Smyth
Belfast North	Hyde									Mills							Carson					
Antrim North	H. O'Neill				P. O'Neill					Clark												
Belfast West	Teevan						McLaughlin					Kilfedder										
Fermanagh and South Tyrone							Grosvenor					Hamilton					West					
Mid Ulster								Forrest														
No. of UUP MPs	10	10	9	9	9	9	11	12	12	12	12	12	11	10	8	7	7	6	6	7	5	5

Constituency	1983	86	1987	90	1992	1997	00	2001	04	2005	10	2010	2015	2017	2019	2024
Antrim East	Beggs															
Upper Bann	McCusker			Trimble												
Belfast South and Mid Down	Smyth															
Lagan Valley	Molyneaux					Donaldson										
Belfast North	Walker															
Fermanagh and South Tyrone	Maginnis												Elliott			
Londonderry East	Ross															
Strangford	Taylor															
Antrim South	Forsythe							Burnside					Kinahan			Swann
Down South	Powell															
Newry and Armagh	Nicholson															
West Tyrone						Thompson										
Down North								Hermon								
Constituency	11	10	9	9	9	10	9	6	5	1	0	0	2	0	0	1
