= William Richardson =

William, Will, Willie, Bill, or Billy Richardson may refer to:

== Government and politics ==
=== Ireland ===
- William Richardson (1656–1727), MP for Armagh and Hillsborough
- William Richardson (died 1755) (1690–1755), MP for Augher
- William Richardson (1710–1758), MP for Armagh
- William Richardson (1749–1822), MP for Armagh
- Sir William Richardson, 1st Baronet (died 1830), MP for Augher and Ballyshannon

=== United States ===
- Bill Richardson (1947–2023), governor of New Mexico, U.S. secretary of energy, congressman; 2008 presidential candidate
- Friend Richardson (William Richardson, 1865–1943), 25th governor of California
- H. L. Richardson (Hubert Leon "Bill" Richardson, 1927–2020), California state senator
- Willy Bo Richardson (born 1974), American artist
- William Richardson (Alabama politician) (1839–1914), U.S. representative from Alabama, 1900–1914
- William Richardson (Maryland politician) (1735–1825), Revolutionary War soldier
- William Richardson (Mississippi politician) (1951–1997), Mississippi politician and teacher
- William Richardson (South Carolina politician) (1743–1786), South Carolina politician
- William Adams Richardson (1821–1896), Treasury secretary
- William Alexander Richardson (1811–1875), U.S. senator from Illinois
- William B. Richardson (1874–1945), Minnesota state senator
- William E. Richardson (1886–1948), U.S. representative from Pennsylvania
- William H. Richardson (1820-1855), General, later in 1853, appointed U.S. Marshal of the Northern District of California by Franklin Pierce
- William Henry Richardson (1808–1878), Connecticut state legislator
- William M. Richardson (1774–1838), U.S. representative from Massachusetts, 1811–1814
- William P. Richardson (Ohio politician) (1824–1886), Republican politician from the state of Ohio, USA
- William P. Richardson (law school dean) (1864–1945), American co-founder and first dean of Brooklyn Law School
- William P. Richardson (New York politician) (1848–1923), New York politician
- William S. Richardson (1919–2010), lieutenant governor of Hawaii
- William O. Richardson (born 1954), American politician
- William U. Richardson, lawyer and member of the Louisiana House of Representatives
- Willie Richardson (anti-racism advocate), American civil rights activist and community advocate

=== Other ===
- Bill Richardson (Australian politician), Lord Mayor of Darwin 1957–1958 and 1969–1971
- William Richardson (colonial administrator) (died 1829), deputy governor of Anguilla, Leeward Islands (UK)
- William Westbrooke Richardson (died 1771), high sheriff of Sussex, England, in 1770
- William Richardson (Ontario politician), Canada

== Sports ==
=== Association football (soccer) ===
- Billy Richardson (footballer, born 1896) (1896–1959), English footballer
- Bill Richardson (footballer, born 1908) (1908–1985), English footballer
- William "Ginger" Richardson, known as W. G. Richardson (1909–1959), English footballer
- Billy Richardson (footballer, born 1920) (1920–2004), Irish soccer player
- Bill Richardson (footballer, born 1943), English footballer

=== Cricket ===
- William Richardson (Cambridge University cricketer) (1861–1933), English cricketer with Cambridge University
- William Richardson (New South Wales cricketer) (1866–1930), Australian cricketer with New South Wales
- William Richardson (Worcestershire cricketer) (1894–1971), English cricketer with Worcestershire
- William Richardson (Derbyshire cricketer) (born 1938), English cricketer with Derbyshire

=== Other sports ===
- Bill Richardson (baseball) (1878–1949), American baseball player
- William Richardson (footballer) (1880–1903), Australian rules footballer
- Bill Richardson (runner) (1903–1969), American Olympic runner
- Willie Richardson (1939–2016), American football wide receiver
- Willie Richardson (wrestler), member of Da Soul Touchaz
- Will Richardson (American football) (born 1996), American football player
- Will Richardson (basketball) (born 1999), American basketball player
- William Ryder Richardson (1861–1920), English rugby union player

== Religion ==
- William Richardson (martyr) (1572–1603), beatified Roman Catholic martyr
- William Richardson (bishop) (1844–1915), Anglican Bishop of Zanzibar, 1895–1901

== Academics ==
- William Richardson (antiquary) (1698–1775), English academic and antiquary
- William Richardson (classicist) (1743–1814), Scottish professor and scholar
- William Richardson (astronomer) (1796–1872), British astronomer
- William J. Richardson (1920–2016), American philosopher
- William C. Richardson (1940–2021), president of Johns Hopkins University, 1990–1995
- William D. Richardson (born 1951), director of the UCL Wolfson Institute since 2012
- William Bebb Richardson (1912–2006), American mammalogist

== Other ==
- William Anthony Richardson (1795–1856), sea captain and early California entrepreneur
- William Blaney Richardson (1868–1927), American-Nicaraguan naturalist
- W. P. Richardson (trade unionist) (William Pallister Richardson, 1873–1930), British trade unionist
- William R. Richardson (1929–2023), U.S. Army general
- William R. Richardson (Medal of Honor) (1842–1873), Union Army soldier and Medal of Honor recipient
- William Richardson (songwriter), Tyneside songwriter
- Will Richardson (educator), author and blogger
- Bill Richardson (journalist) (1909–1986), British newspaper editor
- Bill Richardson (broadcaster) (born 1955), Canadian radio broadcaster and author
- Billy Richardson (Pony Express rider) (1834–1862)
