= William Brownlow (1726–1794) =

Anglo-Irish politician

The Right Honourable William Brownlow PC (I)
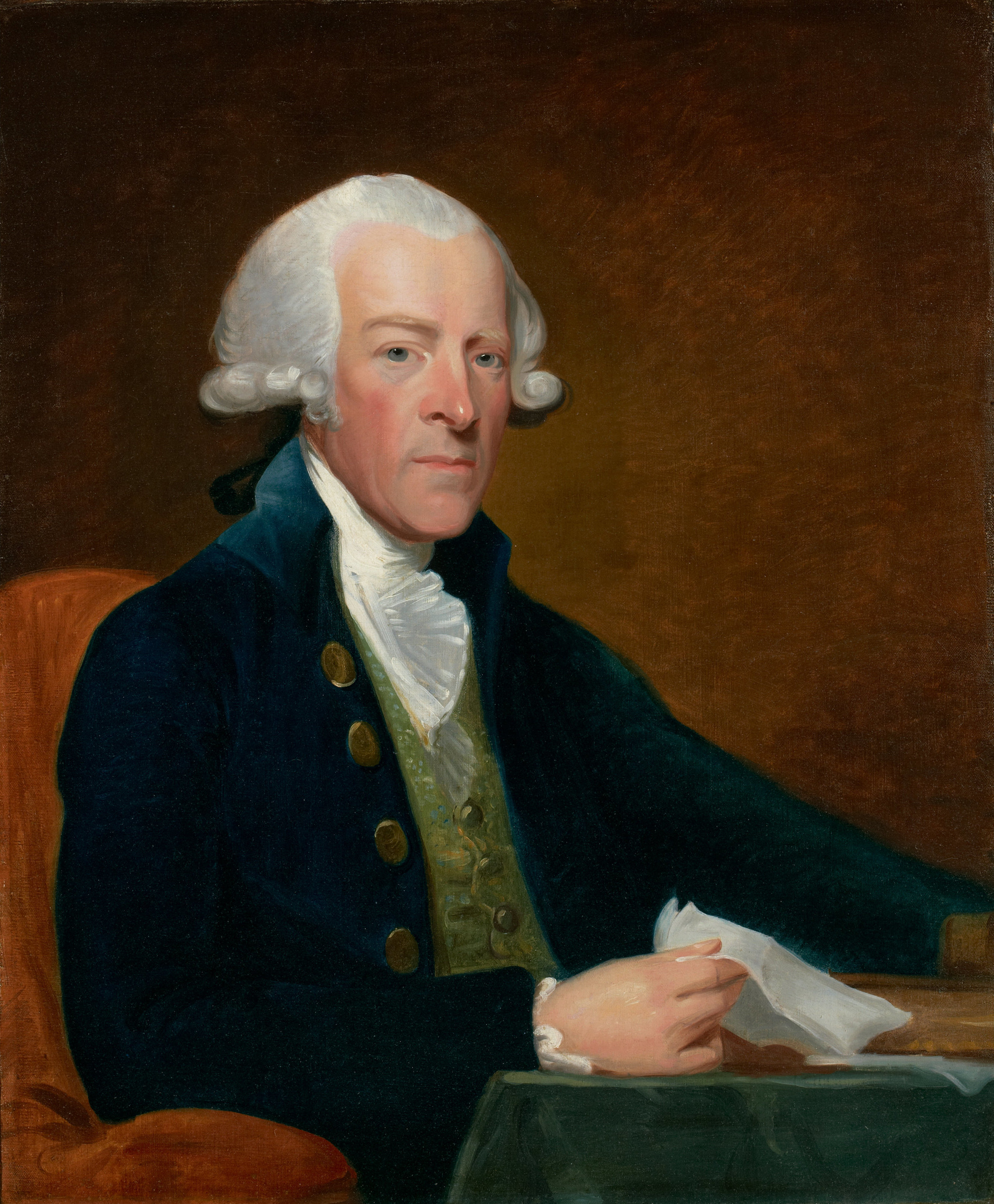
- Portrait of Brownlow, by Gilbert Stuart, c. 1790

Member of the Ireland Parliament for County Armagh
- In office 1753–1794
- Preceded by: William Richardson; Robert Cope
- Succeeded by: William Richardson; William Brownlow

Member of the Ireland Parliament for Strabane
- In office 1768–1769
- Preceded by: George Montgomery; John Stuart Hamilton
- Succeeded by: Claude Hamilton; John Stuart Hamilton

Personal details
- Born: 10 April 1726
- Died: 28 October 1794 (aged 68)
- Spouses: Judith Meredyth; Catherine Hall
- Parents: William Brownlow; Elizabeth Hamilton

William Brownlow PC (I) (10 April 1726 – 28 October 1794) of Lurgan, County Armagh was an Anglo-Irish politician.

== Early life ==
He was the only son of William Brownlow MP and Lady Elizabeth Hamilton, daughter of James Hamilton, 6th Earl of Abercorn and Elizabeth Reading.

== Career ==
Brownlow served as High Sheriff of Armagh for 1750 and was first elected to the Irish House of Commons as the Member of Parliament for County Armagh in 1753, styled The Right Honourable and holding the seat until his death. He was also returned for the Strabane constituency in 1768, but was replaced in 1769. He was an officer of the Irish Volunteers and one of the founding subscribers of the Bank of Ireland in 1783. He was generally seen as a reformer, although there were allegations that he misused public funds to improve his demesne.

== Personal life ==
He married firstly Judith Letitia Meredyth, daughter of the Reverend Charles Meredyth, Dean of Ardfert, and had at least two sons and a daughter, including:

- William Brownlow (1755–1815), MP for County Armagh who married Charity Forde, daughter of Mathew Forde, in 1795.
- Catherine Brownlow (1755–1815), who married Mathew Forde, son of Mathew Forde, in 1782.
- Charles Brownlow (1757–1822), who married Caroline Ashe, daughter of Benjamin Ashe, in 1785.

He married secondly Catherine Hall, daughter of Roger Hall of Mount Hall, County Down, and the former and Catherine Savage. Together, they had at least six further children, including: (Note: Sources vary as to the number of children Brownlow had. The Dictionary of Irish Biography suggests a total of nine: two sons by Judith, and two sons and five daughters by Catherine. Conversely, Linkin indicates that he had three sons and one daughter by Judith, and at least two sons and four daughters (and possibly four additional children) by Catherine.)

- Elizabeth Brownlow (d. 1831), who married John Bligh, 4th Earl of Darnley, in 1791.
- Isabella Brownlow (d. 1848), who married Richard Wingfield, 4th Viscount Powerscourt, son of Richard Wingfield, 3rd Viscount Powerscourt and Lady Amelia Stratford, in 1796.
- Frances Letitia Brownlow (d. 1840), who married John Vesey, 2nd Viscount de Vesci of Abbeyleix, son of Thomas Vesey, 1st Viscount de Vesci, in 1800.
- Rev. Francis Brownlow (1779–1847), who married Lady Catherine Brabazon, daughter of Anthony Brabazon, 8th Earl of Meath, in 1799.

William, his eldest son and heir, also became an MP for County Armagh and founded the bank of William Brownlow Esq.,& Co. Charles became a Lieutenant-Colonel in the 57th Foot and succeeded his childless brother in 1815. Charles's son, also named Charles, became 1st Baron Lurgan.

== Notes ==
Parliament of Ireland
Preceded by William Richardson; Robert Cope	Member of Parliament for County Armagh; 1753–1794; With: William Richardson (1753–1758); Francis Caulfeild (1758–1761); Sir Archibald Acheson, Bt. (1761–1776); Thomas Dawson (1776–1783); William Richardson (1783–1794)	Succeeded by William Richardson; William Brownlow
Preceded by George Montgomery; John Stuart Hamilton	Member of Parliament for Strabane; 1768; With: John Stuart Hamilton	Succeeded by Claude Hamilton; John Stuart Hamilton
