= William Brownlow (1683–1739) =

Anglo-Irish politician

William Brownlow (31 December 1683 – 27 August 1739) was an Anglo-Irish politician.

He was the eldest son of Arthur Chamberlain Brownlow and Jane Hartstonge, daughter of Sir Standish Hartstonge, 1st Baronet of Bruff, County Limerick, a Baron of the Court of Exchequer (Ireland), and his first wife Elizabeth Jermyn of Gunton Hall, Norfolk. His father was the son of Patrick Chamberlain and Letitia Brownlow, and adopted his mother's family name on inheriting the estate of his grandfather, Sir William Brownlow, who married Eleanor O'Doherty, daughter of Sir Cahir O'Doherty.

He was educated at Trinity College Dublin. Brownlow was elected to the Irish House of Commons as the Member of Parliament for County Armagh in 1711, and held the seat at subsequent elections until his death in 1739.

He married Lady Elizabeth Hamilton, daughter of James Hamilton, 6th Earl of Abercorn and Elizabeth Reading; they had four daughters and one son, William, who would also become MP for Armagh.

Parliament of Ireland
Preceded by Arthur Brownlow; Sir Hans Hamilton, Bt.	Member of Parliament for County Armagh; 1711–1739; With: Sir Hans Hamilton, Bt. (1711–1713); Robert Cope (1713–1715); William Richardson (1715–1727); Robert Cope (1727–1739)	Succeeded by William Richardson; Robert Cope
