= Francis Caulfeild, 2nd Earl of Charlemont =

Irish peer and politician

The Right Honourable The Earl of Charlemont KP, PC (Ire)

Member of the House of Lords
- Lord Temporal
- as Irish representative peer 12 December 1806 – 26 December 1863
- Preceded by: The 1st Earl Landaff
- Succeeded by: The 16th Baron of Dunsany
- as Baron Charlemont; 1837 – 26 December 1863
- Preceded by: Peerage created
- Succeeded by: The 3rd Earl of Charlemont

Personal details
- Born: Francis William Caulfeild; 3 January 1775
- Died: 26 December 1863 (aged 88)
- Parent: James Caulfeild, 1st Earl of Charlemont (father)

Francis William Caulfeild, 2nd Earl of Charlemont (3 January 1775 – 26 December 1863), styled Viscount Caulfeild until 1799, was an Irish peer and politician.

He was born the elder son of James Caulfeild, 1st Earl of Charlemont, and his wife Mary Hickman, daughter of Thomas Hickman of County Clare.

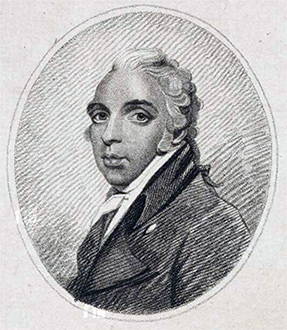

In 1798 Caulfeild stood for Charlemont and County Armagh. He represented the latter constituency in the Irish House of Commons until 1799, when he became Earl of Charlemont on the death of his father. On 12 December 1806, he was elected as an Irish representative peer and assumed his seat in the House of Lords. He was appointed a Knight of the Order of St Patrick on 19 October 1831. In 1837, he was created Baron Charlemont in the Peerage of the United Kingdom, thereby giving him and his descendants an automatic seat in the House of Lords. He was Lord Lieutenant of Tyrone from 1839, and was a member of the Privy Council of Ireland.

He married Anne Bermingham, the daughter and co-heiress of William Bermingham of Ross Hill, County Galway, his wife and Mary Rutledge. He died at his seat, Marino House in Clontarf, Dublin. His four children pre-deceased him and he was consequently succeeded in his estate and title by his nephew, James Molyneux Caulfeild.

Parliament of Ireland
Preceded by Richard Jephson; Sir Annesley Stewart, 6th Bt	Member of Parliament for Charlemont; 1798; With: Richard Jephson 1798; Francis Dobbs 1798–1801	Succeeded by Richard Jephson; William Plunket
Preceded by William Richardson; William Brownlow	Member of Parliament for County Armagh; 1798–1799; With: Hon. Archibald Acheson	Succeeded by Hon. Archibald Acheson; Robert Camden Cope
Political offices
Preceded by The Earl Landaff	Representative peer for Ireland; 1806–1863	Succeeded by The Lord Dunsany
Honorary titles
Preceded by The Earl of Caledon	Lord Lieutenant of Tyrone; 1839–1863	Succeeded by The Earl of Charlemont
Peerage of Ireland
Preceded by James Caulfeild	Earl of Charlemont; 1799–1863	Succeeded by James Caufeild
Preceded by James Caulfeild	Viscount Charlemont; 1799–1863	Succeeded by James Caufeild
Preceded by James Caulfeild	Baron Caulfeild; 1799–1863	Succeeded by James Caufeild
Peerage of the United Kingdom
New creation	Baron Charlemont; 1837–1863; Member of the House of Lords (1837–1863)	Succeeded by James Caufeild
