= Archibald Acheson, 2nd Earl of Gosford =

Irish politician (1776-1849)

The Right Honourable The Earl of Gosford GCB PC
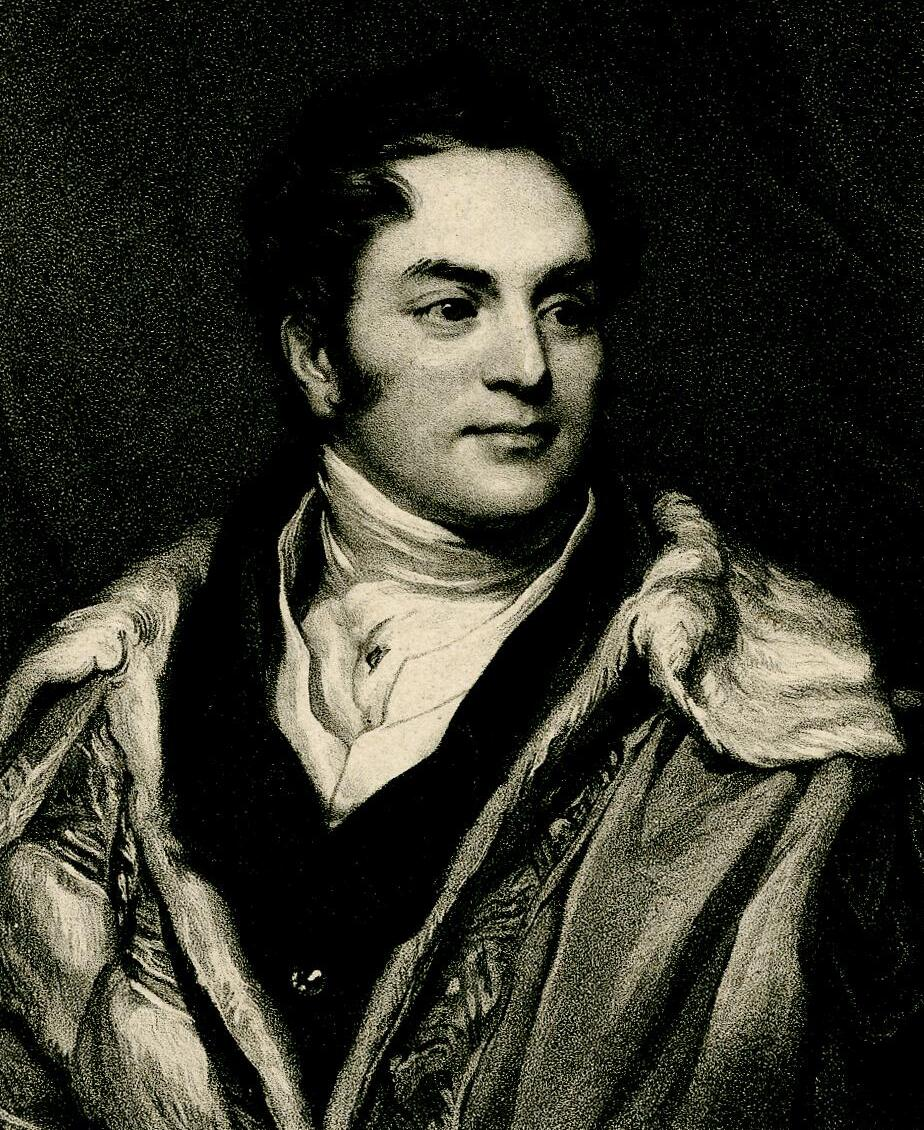
- Engraving by Richard James Lane after a Thomas Phillips portrait, 1828

Member of Parliament for County Armagh
- In office 1801–1807
- Preceded by: New constituency
- Succeeded by: Henry Caulfeild; William Brownlow

Personal details
- Born: Archibald Acheson; 1 August 1776 Markethill, County Armagh
- Died: 27 March 1849 (aged 72)
- Spouse: Mary Sparrow
- Children: Archibald Acheson, 3rd Earl of Gosford; Lady Mary Acheson; Lady Millicent Acheson
- Parents: Arthur Acheson, 1st Earl of Gosford (father); Millicent Pole (mother)

Archibald Acheson, 2nd Earl of Gosford, GCB, PC (1 August 1776 – 27 March 1849), styled The Honourable Archibald Acheson from 1790 to 1806 and Lord Acheson from 1806 to 1807, was a British politician who served as Lieutenant-Governor of Lower Canada and Governor General of British North America in the 19th century.

== Early life ==
Acheson was born on 1 August 1776 at Markethill, County Armagh, Ireland. Gosford was the son of Arthur Acheson, 1st Earl of Gosford, and his wife Millicent (née Pole). He succeeded his father to his titles and estates in 1807.

== Career ==
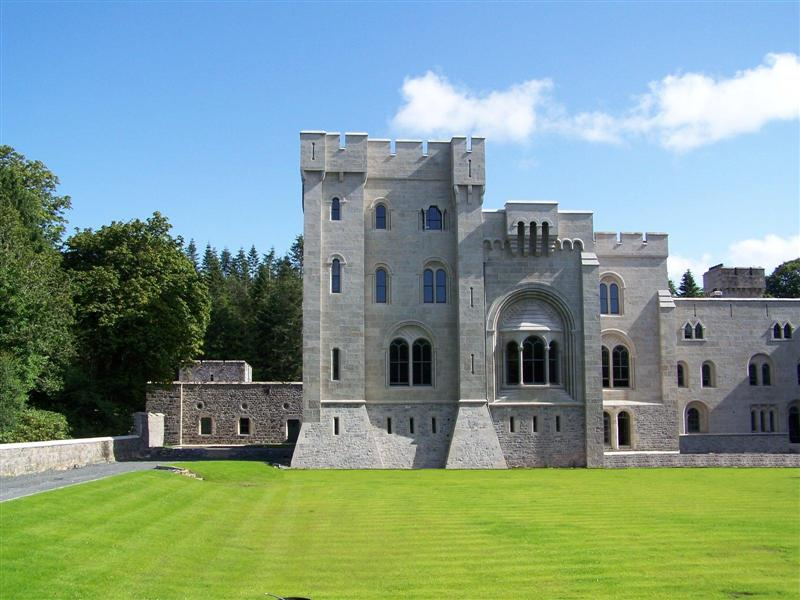
Gosford Castle, County Armagh

Acheson sat in the Irish House of Commons for County Armagh from 1798 until the Act of Union in 1801, when Ireland became part of the United Kingdom. Subsequently, he was a Member of the British House of Commons representing Armagh to 1807, when he succeeded to his father's Irish titles as Earl of Gosford. He entered the British House of Lords in 1811 upon being elected an Irish representative peer.

In 1831 he was appointed the first Lord Lieutenant of Armagh for life, having previously been a Governor of Armagh since 1805. The new position incorporated the post of Custos Rotulorum of County Armagh which he also already held. He was also Colonel of the Armagh Militia from 19 November 1834. He was created Baron Worlingham in the Peerage of the United Kingdom in 1835 and thus became a member of the UK House of Lords in his own right. He commissioned Thomas Hopper (1776–1856) to design a new house, Gosford Castle on his Gosford estate. The house would not be completed until after his death.

In 1835, he became Governor General of British North America (also Lieutenant-Governor of Lower Canada), and commissioner in the Royal Commission for the Investigation of all Grievances Affecting His Majesty's Subjects of Lower Canada. He was instructed to appease the reformists, led by Louis-Joseph Papineau, without giving them any real power. Gosford attempted to distance himself from his predecessor, Lord Aylmer, who had exacerbated the hostility of French-Canadians to the British administration. Gosford officially established the Diocese of Montreal in 1836, though it had been unofficially created a few years before. In August of that year Gosford dissolved the Legislative Assembly when they refused to pass his budget.

In November, Lord Gosford learned of the planned Lower Canada Rebellion and had many of Papineau's followers arrested, although Papineau himself escaped to the United States. The next month, he issued a reward for the capture of Papineau, and declared martial law in Lower Canada.

Lord Gosford resigned in November 1837 and returned to Britain the next year. Lord Durham, was appointed Governor General in 1838. He produced the Durham Report which recommended that Lower Canada and Upper Canada be reunited, with responsible government, which Lord Gosford had unsuccessfully argued against.

== Personal life ==
He married Mary Sparrow, the daughter and heiress of Robert Sparrow of Worlingham Hall, Suffolk, with whom he had a son and four daughters.

- Archibald Acheson, 3rd Earl of Gosford (20 August 1806 – 15 June 1864), he succeeded his father upon his death.
- Lady Mary Acheson (27 June 1809 – 13 March 1850). On 9 July 1835 she married James Hewitt, 4th Viscount Lifford. They had four sons, and four daughters.
- Lady Millicent French Acheson (circa 1812 – 29 August 1887). She married Henry Bence Jones on 28 May 1842. They had three sons, and four daughters. The youngest son, Archibald, married a daughter of Henry Lopes, 1st Baron Ludlow.

Lord Gosford died in 1849.

=== Legacy ===
It is believed the city of Gosford in New South Wales, Australia was named after him, the Governor of New South Wales having served with him in Canada.

== See also ==
- List of Canadian Governors General

Parliament of Ireland
Preceded by William Richardson; William Brownlow	Member of Parliament for County Armagh; 1798 – 1801; With: Viscount Caulfeild 1798–1799; Robert Camden Cope 1799–1801	Succeeded by Parliament of the United Kingdom
Parliament of the United Kingdom
New constituency	Member of Parliament for County Armagh; 1801 – 1807; With: Robert Camden Cope 1801–1802; Henry Caulfeild 1802–1807	Succeeded by Henry Caulfeild; William Brownlow
Political offices
Preceded by The Viscount Longueville	Representative peer for Ireland; 1811–1849	Succeeded by The Lord Kilmaine
Preceded by The Marquess of Clanricarde	Captain of the Yeomen of the Guard; 1834	Succeeded by The Earl of Courtown
Preceded by The Earl of Courtown	Captain of the Yeomen of the Guard; 1835	Succeeded by The Earl of Ilchester
Preceded by The Lord Aylmer	Governor General of British North America; 1835–1837	Succeeded by Sir John Colborne (acting)
Honorary titles
New title	Lord Lieutenant of Armagh; 1831–1849	Succeeded by The Earl of Charlemont
Peerage of Ireland
Preceded by Arthur Acheson	Earl of Gosford; 1807–1849	Succeeded by Archibald Acheson
Peerage of the United Kingdom
New creation	Baron Worlingham; 1835–1849	Succeeded by Archibald Acheson
