= High Sheriff of Armagh =

British judicial representative

The High Sheriff of Armagh is the Sovereign's judicial representative in County Armagh. Initially an office for lifetime, assigned by the Sovereign, the High Sheriff became annually appointed from the Provisions of Oxford in 1258. Besides his/her judicial importance, they have ceremonial and administrative functions and executes High Court Writs.

== History ==
The first (High) Shrivalties were established before the Norman Conquest in 1066 and date back to Saxon times. In 1908, an Order in Council made the Lord-Lieutenant the Sovereign's prime representative in a county and reduced the High Sheriff's precedence. However the office still retained the responsibility for the preservation of law and order in a county.

While the office of High Sheriff ceased to exist in those Irish counties, which had formed the Irish Free State in 1922, it is still present in the counties of Northern Ireland.

== James I, 1603–1625 ==
- 1603: Sir Marmaduke Whitchurch
- 1613: Charles Poyntz
- 1618:
- 1622:
- 1623: Sir William Brownlow

== Charles I, 1625–1649 ==
- 1625:
- 1626:
- 1627:
- 1628:
- 1629:
- 1630:
- 1631:
- 1632:
- 1633:
- 1634:
- 1635:
- 1636:

== English Interregnum, 1649–1660 ==
- 1655: Sir George Acheson, 3rd Bt
- 1656: Sir George Acheson, 3rd Bt
- 1659:

== Charles II, 1660–1685 ==
- 1660:
- 1661:
- 1662:
- 1663:
- 1664:
- 1665: Edward Richardson of Legacorry
- 1666:
- 1667:
- 1668: Arthur Brownlow
- 1669: Arthur Brownlow
- 1670:
- 1671:
- 1672:

- 1673:
- 1674:
- 1675:
- 1676:
- 1677:
- 1678: Godfrey Walker
- 1679:
- 1680:
- 1681:
- 1682:
- 1683:
- 1684: George Blacker

== James II, 1685–1688 ==
- 1685:
- 1686: Marcus Clerk

- 1687:
- 1688: Hamlett Obins

== William III, 1689–1702 ==
- 1689:
- 1690: William Richardson of Legacorry
- 1691:
- 1692:
- 1693:
- 1694:
- 1695: Sir Nicholas Acheson, 4th Bt

- 1696:
- 1697: Arthur Brownlow
- 1698:
- 1699:
- 1700:
- 1701:

== Anne, 1702–1714 ==
- 1702: Roger Hall
- 1703:
- 1704:
- 1705:
- 1706:
- 1707:

- 1708:
- 1709:
- 1710:
- 1711:
- 1712:
- 1713:

== George I, 1714–1727 ==
- 1714: Edward Bond
- 1715: John Richardson
- 1716: James Maison
- 1717: Oliver St John
- 1718: John Maxwell
- 1719: John Bolton
- 1720: Henry Richardson

- 1721: Sir William Johnston
- 1722: Joshua Johnston
- 1723: Thomas Tipping
- 1724: Thomas Clarke
- 1725: Anthony Madden
- 1726: Francis Obre

== George II, 1727–1760 ==
- 1727: William Jones
- 1728: Sir Arthur Acheson, 5th Bt
- 1729: Meredith Workman
- 1730: John Ball
- 1731: Thomas D. Clarke
- 1732: Chapel Dawson
- 1733: Richard Johnston
- 1734: William Blacker of Carrickblacker and Brookend
- 1735: Randal Donaldson
- 1736: Robert Cope
- 1737: William Richardson of Richhill Castle
- 1738: William Graham
- 1739: Roger Hall of Mount Hall
- 1740: Francis Hall
- 1741: Edward Obre
- 1742: Richard Chapel Whaley
- 1743: Richard Graham

- 1744: Sir Capel Molyneux, 3rd Bt
- 1745: Henry Bond
- 1746: Thomas Tipping
- 1747: Middleton Bond
- 1748: Jonathan Seaver
- 1749: Thomas Bond
- 1750: William Brownlow
- 1751: Sir Archibald Acheson, 6th Bt
- 1752: Alexander Stewart
- 1753: Meredith Workman
- 1754: Thomas T. Dawson
- 1755: Huntly Hutcheson
- 1756: Hon. William Moore
- 1757: John Bond
- 1758: Richard Johnston
- 1759: Arthur Irwin

== George III, 1760–1820 ==
- 1760: Richard Jackson
- 1761: Daniel Kelly
- 1762: Richard Magenis
- 1763: Thomas Rowe
- 1764: Michael Obins of Castle Obins
- 1765: Thomas Clarke
- 1766: Arthur Cope
- 1767: John Moore
- 1768: Thomas Obre
- 1769: Henry Cust
- 1770: Thomas Dawson
- 1771: Richard Johnston
- 1772: Thomas Clarke
- 1773: Edward Tipping
- 1774: Arthur Graham
- 1775: Thomas Seaver of Heath Hall (son of Jonathan, HS 1748)
- 1776: Samuel MacGeough of Derrycaw
- 1777: William Richardson of Richhill Castle
- 1778: Arthur Noble
- 1779: Thomas M. Jones
- 1780: Maxwell Close of Elm Park
- 1781: James Alexander, 1st Earl of Caledon
- 1782: Henry Harden
- 1783: Sir Walter Synnot of Ballymoyer House
- 1784: Thomas Verner
- 1785: John Maxwell
- 1786: John Reilly
- 1787: William Brownlow
- 1788: Alexander Thomas Stewart
- 1789: James Verner

- 1790: James Johnston
- 1791: Nicholas Archdall Cope
- 1792: James Harden
- 1793: John Pringle
- 1794: John Ogle
- 1795: Savage Hall of Narrow Water
- 1796: John Ogle
- 1797: Robert Bernard Sparrow
- 1798: Kenrick Cope
- 1799: Robert Camden Cope ‡ / succeeded by Archibald Eyre Obins
- 1800: Thomas Verner
- 1801: Du Pré Alexander, Viscount Alexander
- 1802: John Henry Burges
- 1803: John Moore
- 1804: John O'Donnell
- 1805: Sir Capel Molyneux, 4th Bt
- 1806: George Ensor
- 1807: Jonathan Seaver of Heath Hall (son of Thomas, HS 1775)
- 1808: John Reade
- 1809: Robert Harden
- 1810: Hon. Jerome de Salis
- 1811: William Blacker
- 1812: Nicholas George Johnston
- 1813: Charles Eastwood
- 1814: Robert Macan
- 1815: Roger Hall
- 1816: Joseph Atkinson
- 1817: William Irwin of Mount Irwin
- 1818: Maxwell Close of Drumbanagher
- 1819: Walter MacGeough-Bond of Drumsill, Siver Bridge

== George IV, 1820–1830 ==
- 1820: Thomas J. Thornton
- 1821: Samuel Cope
- 1822: William Verner
- 1823: Sir James Strong
- 1824: James Johnston

- 1825: Thomas Atkinson
- 1826: Acheson St George
- 1827: William Olpherts
- 1828: Barry Fox
- 1829: Hunt Walsh Chambre of Hawthorn Hill

== William IV, 1830–1837 ==
- 1830: Marcus Synnot of Ballymoyer House
- 1831: Hugh Harris
- 1832: Hon. Henry Caulfeild
- 1833: James Eastwood

- 1834: Charles Brownlow
- 1835: Sir Edmund Bacon, 10th Baronet
- 1836: James Alexander, Viscount Alexander

== Victoria, 1837–1901 ==
- 1837: Sir George King Adlercron Molyneux, 6th Bt
- 1838: Leonard Dobbin
- 1839: Thomas Wilson
- 1840: William Jones Armstrong
- 1841: John Whaley
- 1842: James Molyneux Caulfeild
- 1843: Sir James Matthew Stronge, 3rd Baronet
- 1844: John Robert Irwin
- 1845: Thomas Morris Hamilton Jones of Moneyglass House
- 1846: Robert Wright Cope
- 1847: Maxwell Cross of Dartan
- 1848: William Verner
- 1849: Richard Blackson Houston
- 1850: James Harden
- 1851: George Robinson
- 1852: Marcus Synnot of Ballymoyer House
- 1853: Hon. Peter John Fane de Salis
- 1854: Maxwell Charles Close of Drumbanagher House
- 1855: Joseph Atkinson of Crowhill
- 1856: Henry Alexander of Forkhill House
- 1857: George Dunbar
- 1858: Stewart Blacker
- 1859: Edward James Saunderson
- 1860: William Cross of Dartan
- 1861: St John Thomas Blacker-Douglass of Grace Hall
- 1862: John James Bigger
- 1863: William Kirk
- 1864: Sir Capel Molyneux, 7th Baronet of Castle Dillon
- 1865: Hugh Harris of Ashfort
- 1866: H. W. Canefeild
- 1867: Sir Capel Molyneux, 7th Bt
- 1868: John Alexander Mainley Cope of Drumilly

- 1869: Samuel Madden Francis Hall of Narrow water
- 1870: John William Ellison-Macartney of Mountjoy Grange
- 1871: Richard James Harden of Harrybrook
- 1872: Joshua Walter MacGeough Bond of Drumsill
- 1873:
- 1874:
- 1875: Henry Armstrong
- 1876: Mark Seton Synnot of Ballymoyer House
- 1877: Thomas Simpson
- 1878: Patrick George Hamilton Carvill
- 1879: James Henry Todd-Thornton of Westbrook, Co. Donegal
- 1880: William James Hall of Narrow Water
- 1881:
- 1882:
- 1883: Granville Henry Jackson Alexander
- 1884: George Miller Dobbin of Drumulla House, Co. Louth
- 1885: Sir James Henry Stronge, 5th Bt
- 1886: William Arthur Irwin of Carnagh
- 1887: George de la Poer Beresford of Awbawn
- 1888: John Mervyn Archdall Carleton Richardson
- 1889:
- 1890: Henry Barcroft of the Glen
- 1891: James Rolston Lonsdale
- 1892: William Maynard Sinton
- 1893:
- 1894:
- 1895: John Brownlee Lonsdale
- 1896: Harry Felix Verner
- 1897:
- 1898: James Barrington-White
- 1899:
- 1900: Roger Hall of Narrow Water

== Edward VII, 1901–1910 ==
- 1901: Joseph Henry Gray
- 1902:
- 1903: William John Talbot
- 1904:
- 1905: Sir John Milne Barbour

- 1906: Joseph Mansergh Palmer
- 1907:
- 1908: Maxwell Archibald Close of Drumbanagher House
- 1909: William McCrum
- 1910:

== George V, 1910–1936 ==
- 1911:
- 1912:
- 1913:
- 1914: Hunt Walsh Leech
- 1915:
- 1916: William Byers
- 1917:
- 1918:
- 1919:
- 1920:
- 1921:
- 1922: Thomas Bowen Johnston
- 1923: Thomas Trew Maclean

- 1924: James Edward Calvert
- 1925: Thomas Henry White
- 1926: John Charters Boyle
- 1927: Samuel Alexander Bell
- 1928: William M. Clow
- 1929: Charles Barclay Macpherson Chambré
- 1930: Thomas Grevilie Sinton
- 1931: Noel Stephen Smith
- 1932: Gilbert Evelyn Barcroft
- 1933: David Malcomson Barcroft
- 1934: Arthur Dawson Allen
- 1935: Hector Charles Chatterton Deane
- 1936: Richard Henry Stephens Richardson

== George VI, 1936–1952 ==
- 1937: Arthur Delacherois Irwin
- 1938: William Edward Greeves
- 1939: George Valentine Crossley Irwin
- 1940: James Edwards Harden
- 1941: George Scott
- 1942: Thomas Averell Shillington
- 1943: Alfred William Cowdy
- 1944: Bunbury Archer Atkinson

- 1945: John Stephen Wakefield Richardson
- 1946: George Norman Proctor
- 1947: Robert McKean Cowdy
- 1948: Archibald Dunlap Gibson
- 1949: Alexander Reginald Wakefield Richardson
- 1950: George Fitzroy Gillespie
- 1951: Ynyr Alfred Burges

== Elizabeth II, 1952–2022 ==
- 1952: Walter Albert Nevill MacGeough-Bond
- 1953: Cecil Brown
- 1954: William Alexander Mullen
- 1955: Harold Brown
- 1956: James Nicholson Brown
- 1957: Edward Kennedy Walkington
- 1958: Alleyn Cardwell Moore
- 1959: Richard Graves Johnston
- 1960: James Robert Bargrave Armstrong
- 1961: Henry Alwyn White
- 1962: Francis Edward Nangle
- 1963: Acheson Harden Glendinning
- 1964: George Edwin McCaw
- 1965: Michael Henry Armstrong
- 1966: George Dougan
- 1967: James Matthew Stronge
- 1968: Thomas Carter Johnston
- 1969: Alexander Edmond Knight
- 1970: John Fitzroy Gillespie
- 1971: Geoffrey Alastair Nisbet Boyne
- 1972: Kenneth McCleery
- 1973: W. Bernard Cowdy
- 1974: Henry William Francis Reid
- 1975: Henry George Glendinning
- 1976: Alexander Hugh O'Brien Greer
- 1977: Donald Henry Stevenson
- 1978: Ronald McIlroy Wilson
- 1979: Frederick Michael Alexander Torrens-Spence
- 1980: John Reginald Miller
- 1981: Alexander Hugh Courtney
- 1982: Andrew Alwyn White
- 1983: J. H. H. Balmer
- 1984: W. H. Jordan
- 1985: E. B. Wilson
- 1986:

- 1987:
- 1988:
- 1989:
- 1990:
- 1991: John Daniel Thompson
- 1992: James Rochester Nelson
- 1993: J. N. Greenlee
- 1994: J. E. Lamb
- 1995: John C. K. Magowan
- 1996: Margaret Patton
- 1997: John Oliver Woods
- 1998: David Eric Dorman
- 1999: Anne E. Cullen
- 2000: Archibald Thomas Laughlan Gibson
- 2001: Patrick Stephen Kellett
- 2002: Mary Catherine Dixon
- 2003: Barbara Ann Gillespie
- 2004: Caroline Bridget Good
- 2005: Leslie Victor Johnston of Armagh
- 2006: Ralph Edward Cope Cowdy of Loughgall
- 2007: Colin Wallace Mathews
- 2008: Desmond Robert David Mitchell
- 2009: Gerard Patrick Millar
- 2010: John Niall Collen
- 2011: Dr Peter W.B. Colvin of Hockley
- 2012: Dr Edmund Peter Beckett of Armagh
- 2013: James Magowan of Loughgilly
- 2014: Paul Reaney of Armagh
- 2015: Anna Louise Shepherd of Tandragee
- 2016: James Arthur Crummie of Portadown
- 2017: Godfrey William McCartney of Killylea
- 2018: Catherine Mary Adams of Craigavon
- 2019: Ian James Chapman of Craigavon
- 2020: Michael Frederick Dickson of Armagh
- 2021: Dr Alan Manson Turtlem of Richhill
- 2022: Henry Gabriel McMullen of Armagh

== Charles III, 2022–present ==
- 2023: Gary Myles Dickson, of Armagh
- 2024: Michael Alexander Curran, of Armagh
- 2025: John William Thomas Shephard
- 2026: Richard James Victor Emerson

== Notes ==
‡ Stood as Member of Parliament
