= Sir Hans Hamilton, 2nd Baronet =

Sir Hans Hamilton, 2nd Baronet (1643 – 1731) was an Anglo-Irish politician.

Hamilton was the son of Sir Robert Hamilton, 1st Baronet, and in 1703 he inherited his father's baronetcy. Hamilton was the Member of Parliament for County Armagh in the Irish House of Commons between 1703 and 1713, before representing Carlingford between 1713 and 1714. His title became extinct upon his death in 1731.

Parliament of Ireland
Preceded by Arthur Brownlow; Sir Nicholas Acheson, Bt	Member of Parliament for County Armagh; 1703-1713; With: Arthur Brownlow (1703-1711); William Brownlow (1711-1713)	Succeeded by William Brownlow; Robert Cope
Preceded by Charles Dering; William Balfour	Member of Parliament for Carlingford; 1713-1714; With: James Stannus	Succeeded by Blayney Townley; James Stannus
Baronetage of Ireland
Preceded by Robert Hamilton	Baronet (of Mount Hamilton); 1703–1731	Extinct
