= Southern groove-toothed moss mouse =

Conservation status
- Data Deficient (IUCN 3.1)

Scientific classification
- Kingdom: Animalia
- Phylum: Chordata
- Class: Mammalia
- Order: Rodentia
- Family: Muridae
- Genus: Microhydromys
- Species: M. argenteus

Binomial name
- Microhydromys argenteus Helgen, Leary, & Aplin, 2010
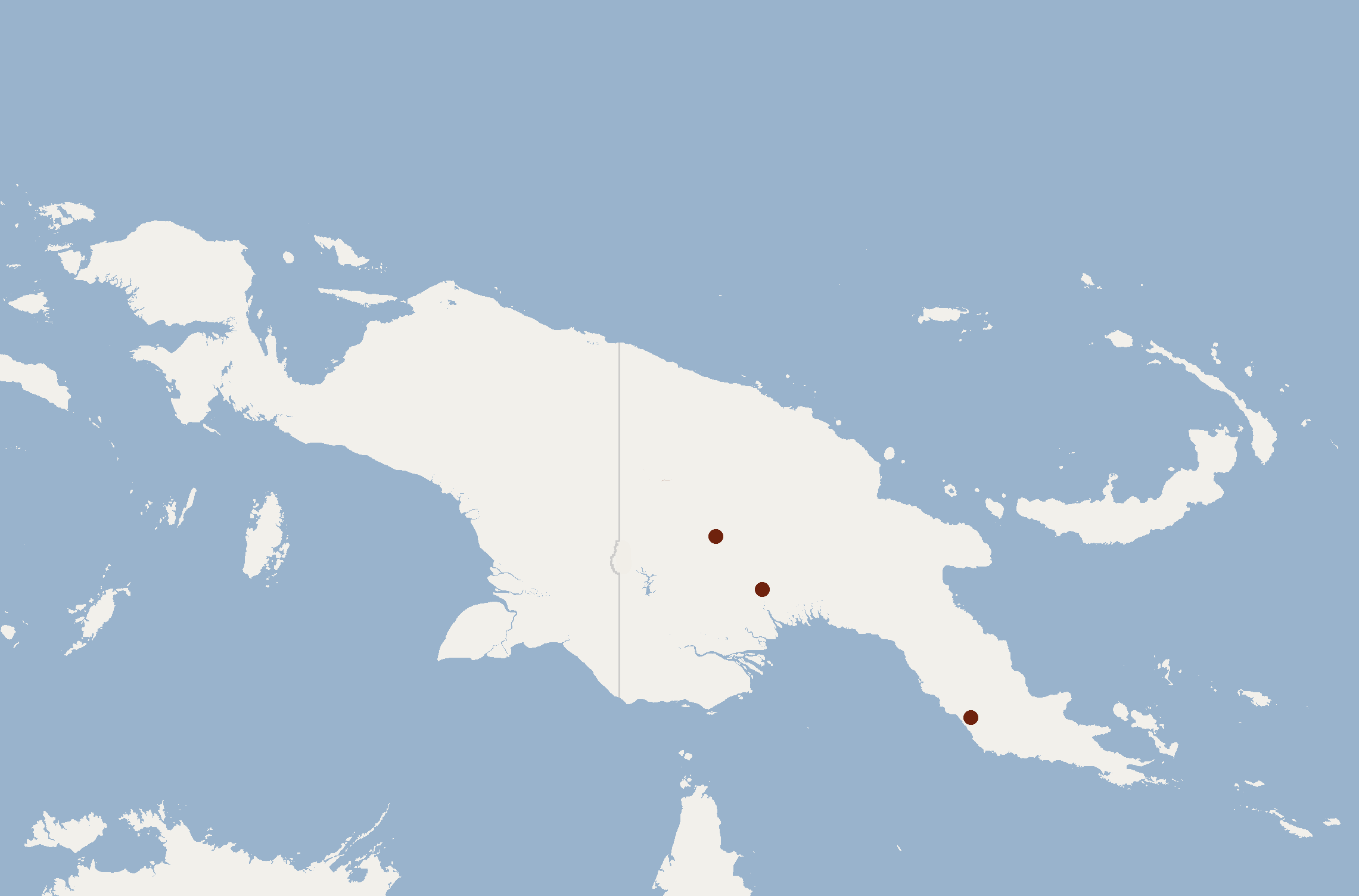
- Distribution of Microhydromys argenteus

Species of rodent

The southern groove-toothed moss mouse (Microhydromys argenteus) is a species of rodent in the family Muridae found in Southern Papua New Guinea. As opposed to M. richardsoni, argenteus sp can be differentiated most prominently by its gray-brown pelage.
