= Sir Nicholas Acheson, 4th Baronet =

Irish baronet and politician

High Sheriff of Armagh
- In office 1695

Personal details
- Born: c. 1655
- Died: 1701
- Spouse: Anne Taylor
- Children: 3

Sir Nicholas Acheson 4th Baronet (c. 1655–1701) was an Irish baronet and politician.

The son of Sir George Acheson, 3rd Baronet, he succeeded to the baronetcy upon the death of his father. Between 1695 and 1699, he represented County Armagh in the Irish House of Commons. In 1695, he was appointed High Sheriff of Armagh.

He married Anne Taylor in 1676, with whom he had the following children:

- Nichola Anne Acheson
- Alexander Acheson (1676–1757)
- Sir Arthur Acheson, 5th Baronet (1688–1748 or 1749)

Parliament of Ireland
| Preceded by Arthur Brownlow; William Richardson | Member of Parliament for County Armagh; 1695–1699; With: Arthur Brownlow | Succeeded by Arthur Brownlow; Sir Hans Hamilton, 2nd Bt |
Baronetage of Nova Scotia
| Preceded by George Acheson | Baronet (of Glencairny); 1685–1701 | Succeeded by Arthur Acheson |
