= Senator Boyle =

Senator Boyle may refer to:

- James Boyle (Maine politician) (born 1958), Maine State Senate
- John Charters Boyle (1869–1950), Senate of Northern Ireland
- Phil Boyle (born 1961), New York State Senate
