= William Brownlow (1755–1815) =

Anglo-Irish politician

William Brownlow (1 September 1755 – 10 July 1815) of Lurgan, County Armagh was an Anglo-Irish Tory politician.

He was the eldest son of William Brownlow (1726–1794) and his wife Judith Letitia Meredith from whom he inherited one of the largest landholdings in Armagh.

He was pricked High Sheriff of Armagh in 1787 and succeeded his father as MP for County Armagh constituency in the Irish House of Commons between 1795 and 1797. In 1807 he was elected as the Tory Member of Parliament for Armagh in the United Kingdom House of Commons, sitting for the seat until his death in 1815.

He founded, with three partners, the private bank of William Brownlow Esq., & Co.

He married in 1803 Charity, the daughter of Matthew Ford of Seaford, but died childless in 1815. He was succeeded by his brother Charles, the father of Charles Brownlow, 1st Baron Lurgan .

Parliament of Ireland
Preceded by William Richardson; William Brownlow	Member of Parliament for County Armagh; 1795 – 1797; With: William Richardson	Succeeded by Hon. Archibald Acheson; Viscount Caulfeild
Parliament of the United Kingdom
Preceded by Hon. Archibald Acheson; Hon. Henry Caulfeild	Member of Parliament for Armagh; 1807 – 1815; With: William Richardson	Succeeded by William Richardson; Hon. Henry Caulfeild
