= Sir Hans Hamilton, 1st Baronet =

Sir Hans Hamilton, 1st Baronet (died 1682) was an Anglo-Irish politician.

Hamilton was the Member of Parliament for County Armagh in the Irish House of Commons between 1661 and 1666. He was knighted in 1661 and on 6 April 1662 he was created a baronet, of Monilla in the Baronetage of Ireland. In 1673 he was made a member of the Privy Council of Ireland. Hamilton was Custos Rotulorum of County Armagh. His title became extinct on his death.

Escutcheon of the Hamilton baronets of Monilla

He married Magdalene, daughter of Sir Edward Trevor, and had one daughter, Sarah, who married Sir Robert Hamilton, 1st Baronet. Hamilton was the nephew of James Hamilton, 1st Viscount Claneboye.

Parliament of Ireland
Preceded by Faithful Fortescue; William Brownlow	Member of Parliament for County Armagh; 1661-1666; With: Edward Richardson	Succeeded by Arthur Brownlow; Walter Hovendon
Baronetage of Ireland
New creation	Baronet (of Monilla); 1662-1682	Extinct
