= Walter Hovendon =

Irish politician and Jacobite

Walter Hovendon (fl. 1689–1691) was an Irish politician and Jacobite.

Hovendon was chosen as a Member of Parliament for County Armagh in the short-lived Patriot Parliament summoned by James II of England in Dublin in 1689. The same year, he was also appointed a deputy lieutenant for Armagh, supporting Sir Neil O'Neill, 2nd Baronet. For his Jacobitism, he lost his public offices and his estates were confiscated following the Williamite War in Ireland.

Parliament of Ireland
Preceded by Hans Hamilton; Edward Richardson	Member of Parliament for County Armagh; 1689; With: Arthur Brownlow	Succeeded by Arthur Brownlow; William Richardson
