= Richhill Castle =

Country house in County Armagh, Northern Ireland

Coordinates: 54.3725°N 6.5489°W

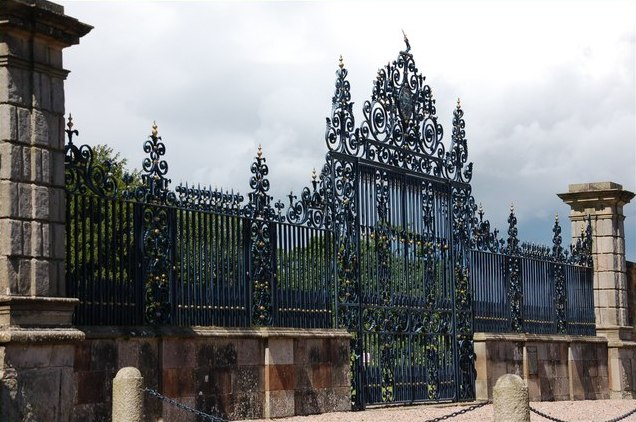
Gates of Richhill Castle now at Hillsborough Castle

Richhill Castle is a 17th-century Grade A listed country house in the large village of Richhill, in the townland of Legacorry, Armagh, Northern Ireland, roughly halfway between Armagh and Portadown.

It is a two-storey building with a gabled attic in the high-pitched roof. It consists of a five-bay central range flanked by two wings, all with Dutch-style gables.

== History ==
The Legacorry estate was acquired in 1610 by Francis Sacherevall, a planter from Leicestershire, who constructed a house on the 1000-acre site. The property passed down to his granddaughter Anne, who had married Major Edward Richardson.

The present house was constructed between 1664 and 1669 for Major Richardson, who served as MP for County Armagh from 1661 to 1689 and was appointed High Sheriff of Armagh for 1665–66. The estate and village then came to be known as Richhill. It was inherited by Edward's son William, twice MP for Co. Armagh (1692–95 and 1715–27) and High Sheriff in 1690, who died without an heir in 1727. The property passed to his brother John and thence to John's grandson William, also MP for Co. Armagh from 1783 to 1798 and High Sheriff for 1777. He commissioned ornate gates and railings eighteen to twenty feet high topped with the Richardson family's coat of arms from the Thornberry Brothers of Armagh. These were removed in 1936 "for safe keeping" to Hillsborough Castle, then the residence of the governor of Northern Ireland.

William married twice and left three daughters, none of whom had children. The estate therefore passed in 1881 to the Richardson's of Rossfad House, Co. Fermanagh, inherited by Colonel John Mervyn Archdall Carleton Richardson, JP and Deputy Lieutenant and High Sheriff in 1888. Since that time there have been various owners, including Major Robert Gordon Berry, the Northern Ireland Education Authority and Sam Hewitt. Sam Hewitt sold it in 1959 to the Lyttle family, the present owners, who have restored much of the house and garden.

There are plans to raise a trust fund and put the building into community use.
