= County Armagh (Parliament of Ireland constituency) =

Pre-1801 Irish constituency

Coordinates: 54.348°N 6.656°W

- Former county constituency for the Irish House of Commons
- County: County Armagh

1585–1801
- Seats: 2
- Replaced by: County Armagh (UKHC)

County Armagh, Ireland, was represented in the Irish House of Commons, the house of representatives of the Kingdom of Ireland, by a county constituency of two MPs until the abolition of the Irish Parliament on 1 January 1801. The parliamentary boroughs of Armagh and Charlemont were separately represented.

Under the Acts of Union 1800, the county was represented by the Westminster constituency of County Armagh with two MPs in the United Kingdom House of Commons. Charlemont lost its separate representation.

== Members of Parliament ==
Election	First MP	Second MP	
1612	Tobias Caulfeild	John Bourchier	
1613	Tobias Caulfeild	Sir Francis Annesley	
1634	Sir Faithful Fortescue	George Radcliffe	
1639	Sir Faithful Fortescue	William Brownlow	
1661	Hans Hamilton	Edward Richardson	
1689	Arthur Brownlow	Walter Hovendon	
1692	Arthur Brownlow	William Richardson	
1695	Arthur Brownlow	Sir Nicholas Acheson, 4th Bt	
1703	Arthur Brownlow	Sir Hans Hamilton, 2nd Bt	
1711	William Brownlow	Sir Hans Hamilton, 2nd Bt	
1713	William Brownlow	Robert Cope	Tory
1715	William Brownlow	William Richardson	
1727	William Brownlow	Robert Cope	Tory
1739	William Richardson	Robert Cope	Tory
1753	William Richardson	William Brownlow	
1758	Francis Caulfeild	William Brownlow	
1761	Sir Archibald Acheson, 6th Bt	William Brownlow	
1776	Thomas Dawson	William Brownlow	
1783	William Richardson	William Brownlow	
1795	William Richardson	William Brownlow	
1798	Hon. Archibald Acheson	Viscount Caulfeild	
1799	Hon. Archibald Acheson	Robert Camden Cope	
1801	Succeeded by the Westminster constituency of County Armagh		

== Bibliography ==
- O'Hart, John (2007). The Irish and Anglo-Irish Landed Gentry: When Cromwell came to Ireland. Vol. II. Heritage Books. ISBN 978-0-7884-1927-0.
- Leigh Rayment's historical List of Members of the Irish House of Commons. Cites: Johnston-Liik, Edith Mary (2002). The History of the Irish Parliament 1692-1800 (6 volumes). Ulster Historical Foundation.
