= Royal Commission for the Investigation of all Grievances Affecting His Majesty's Subjects of Lower Canada =

The Royal Commission for the Investigation of all Grievances Affecting His Majesty's Subjects of Lower Canada was established seven years after the publication of the report of a Select Committee of the House of Commons on the Civil Government of Canada, which had recommended important constitutional changes that were never effected.

Governor Gosford led the royal commission of inquiry as commissioner together with Charles Edward Grey and George Gipps. They received instructions from Charles Grant, 1st Baron Glenelg, Secretary of State for War and the Colonies.

== Report ==
Five reports, in addition to a conclusive general report were prepared by the commission.

The commissioners published a first report on financial matters in January 1836. Drafted by Gipps, the report recommended all crown revenues to be surrendered to the Legislative Assembly with the exception of a modest civil list. A second report was published in March. It recommended the Revenue Act of 1831 to be repealed to place at the disposal of the Executive sufficient funds to carry on the essential services of government. In May, a third report rejected the constitutional change whereby the Executive Council members would be responsible before the elective House of Assembly.

A final report was published on 17 November 1836. Was rejected the idea of modifying the electoral system to increase the representation of British settlers in the colony.

The commission's work became the basis of the ten resolutions which John Russell, then Whig Secretary of State for the Home Department, submitted to the House of Commons on 6 March 1837.

== See also ==
- Lower Canada Rebellion
- Constitutional history of Canada
