= Maxwell Close =

Member of Parliament for County Armagh
- In office 1857–1864 Serving with Sir William Verner, Bt
- Preceded by: James Caulfeild; Sir William Verner, Bt
- Succeeded by: Sir James Stronge, Bt; Sir William Verner, Bt

Member of Parliament for County Armagh
- In office 1874–1885 Serving with Edward Wingfield Verner to 1880; James Nicholson Richardson from 1880

Maxwell Charles Close (25 June 1827 - 25 January 1903) was an Irish Conservative politician who sat in the House of Commons in two periods between 1857 and 1885.

Close was the eldest son of Colonel Maxwell Close of Drumbanagher and his wife Anna Elizabeth Brownlow, sister of Charles Brownlow, 1st Baron Lurgan. His father built Drumbanagher House, which he inherited, along with a large estate in County Armagh. He was educated at Eton College and Christ Church, Oxford. He was a J. P. and a Deputy Lieutenant for County Armagh and was High Sheriff of Armagh in 1854.

At the 1857 general election Close was elected Member of Parliament for Armagh and held the seat until 1864. He was re-elected in 1874 and held the seat until 1885.

Close died of pneumonia at Drumbanagher House on 25 January 1903, at the age of 75.

Close married in 1852 Catherine Deborah Agnes Close, daughter of Henry S. Close of Newtown Park, Dublin. There were five children. His estate was inherited by their son Major Maxwell Archibald Close (1853–1935), an officer in the 13th Hussars, who married Lady Muriel Albany Stuart-Richardson (1869–1928), daughter of the 5th Earl Castle Stewart.

Parliament of the United Kingdom
Preceded by James Caulfeild; Sir William Verner, Bt	Member of Parliament for County Armagh; 1857 – 1864; With: Sir William Verner, Bt	Succeeded by Sir James Stronge, Bt; Sir William Verner, Bt
Preceded by Sir James Stronge, Bt; Edward Wingfield Verner	Member of Parliament for County Armagh; 1874 – 1885; With: Edward Wingfield Verner to 1880; James Nicholson Richardson from 1880	constituency divided
