= Richhill, County Armagh =

Village in County Armagh, Northern Ireland

Coordinates: 54.372°N 6.551°W

Richhill: Irish: Log a' Choire
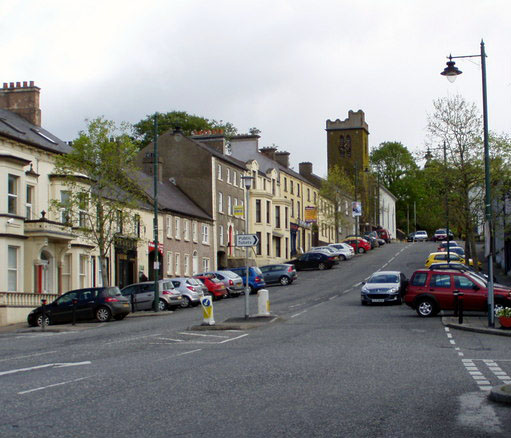

- Location within Northern Ireland
- Population: 2,738 (2021 Census)
  - Belfast: 29 mi (47 km)
- District: Armagh
- County: County Armagh
- Country: Northern Ireland
- Sovereign state: United Kingdom
- Post town: Armagh
- Postcode district: BT61
- Dialling code: 028, +44 28
- UK Parliament: Newry & Armagh
- NI Assembly: Newry & Armagh

Richhill is a large village and townland in County Armagh, Northern Ireland. It lies between Armagh and Portadown. It had a population of 2,738 people in the 2021 Census.

Originally named Legacorry, it takes its name from Edward Richardson, who built the manor house around which the village grew.

== Origins ==
At the beginning of the 1600s, the area of Richhill had long been part of the Irish Gaelic territory of Oneilland. In 1610, as part of the Plantation of Ulster, the land was granted to Englishman Francis Sacherevall. His granddaughter Ann married Edward Richardson, who was an English officer, Member of Parliament for County Armagh from 1655 to 1696, and High Sheriff of Armagh in 1665.

Around 1660, Richardson built a manor house on the site that would become Richhill, and in 1664 it was reported that there were twenty houses there. At this time, the village was named Legacorry, after the townland in which it sprang up. Legacorry comes from Irish Log an Choire, meaning 'hollow of the cauldron'.

In Thomas Molyneux's Journey to the North (1708), the townland appears as "Legacorry, a pretty village belonging to Mr Richardson". It gradually became known as Richardson's Hill and this was shortened to Rich Hill. The original gates to the manor house were wrought by two brothers named Thornberry from Falmouth, Cornwall and were erected in 1745. In 1936 they were moved to the entrance of Hillsborough Castle.

== Village regeneration ==
In 2012, it was announced that work would begin on a £1.5 million regeneration scheme, which will transform the village and involve the restoration of about 20 buildings. The Richhill Partnership began work in 2013 with the concealing of overhead wires and cables on streets within the conservation area, and building restoration work began in early March.

== Transport ==
The Ulster Railway opened Richhill railway station on the line between Belfast and Armagh on 1 March 1848. It was part of the Great Northern Railway from 1876. The Government of Northern Ireland forced the GNR Board to close the line on 1 October 1957.

Portadown is the nearest station run by Northern Ireland Railways with trains to Lanyon Place, Bangor and the Enterprise direct to Belfast Grand Central in the east and south to Newry, Dundalk Clarke and Dublin Connolly. There are proposals to reopen railway lines in Northern Ireland, including a single tracked line Mullingar-Portadown Line via Armagh, Monaghan, Clones, and Cavan and the dual tracked Derry~Londonderry-Portadown Line via Dungannon, Omagh and Strabane.

Ulsterbus operates buses through the village, most of which operate between Belfast and Armagh. These include the 61, 251/a/b, 270/u (Monaghan), 271 and 551a.

== Sport ==
- Broomhill F.C.
- Richhill F.C.
- Richhill Recreation Centre
- Orchard Wheelers Cycling Club
- Armagh and Richhill Beagles
- Lodge Equine Stables and Pony Club Centre
- Intouch Equestrian and Richhill Pony Club Centre
- Richhill Raiders Volleyball Club

== Churches ==
- St Matthew's Church of Ireland
- Richhill Methodist Church
- Richhill Presbyterian Church
- Quakers, The Society of Friends Richhill
- Richhill Elim Church
- Richhill Evangelical Presbyterian Church
- Grace Community Church

== Education ==
- Hardy Memorial Primary School

== Districts ==
- Annareagh
- Ballyleny
- Ballynahinch
- Corcreevy
- Crewcat
- Drumard (Jones)
- Liskyborough
- Maynooth
- Mullaletragh
- Rich Hill Town
- Rich Hill or Legacorry
- Rockmacreeny
- Shewis

== Notable people ==
- Richard Best, judge
- William Richardson, Member of Parliament
- Max Clendinning, architect

== Demographics ==
=== 2021 Census ===
It had a population of 2,738 people in the 2021 Census. Of these:

- 6.57% (180) were from a Catholic background and 83.42% (2,284) were from a Protestant background.

=== 2011 Census ===
It had a population of 2,821 people (1,076 households) in the 2011 Census. Of these:

- 21.1% were aged under 16 years and 78.9% were aged 16 and over
- 49.6% of the population were male and 50.4% were female
- 6.4% were from a Catholic background and 88% were from a Protestant background.
- 3.59% of people aged 16–74 were unemployed

=== 2001 census ===
The NI Statistics and Research Agency (NISRA) classifies Richhill as an intermediate settlement (i.e. with population between 2,250 and 4,500 people). On Census day (29 April 2011) there were 2,818 people living in Richhill. Of these:

- 26.8% were aged under 16 years and 73.2% were aged 16 and over
- 49.8% of the population were male and 50.3% were female
- 3.4% were from a Catholic background and 94.6% were from a Protestant background
- 1.9% of people aged 16–74 were unemployed

== See also ==
- List of towns and villages in Northern Ireland
