= Select Committee of the House of Commons on the Civil Government of Canada =

The Select Committee of the House of Commons on the Civil Government of Canada (also the Canada Committee of 1828) was established by the British House of Commons on May 2, 1828 "to enquire into the state of the civil government of Canada, as established by the Act 31 Geo. III., chap. 31, and to report their observations and opinions thereupon to the house."

== Composition ==
The 21 members of the committee were: William Huskisson, C. Wynn, T. F. Lewis, S. Bourne, N. Tindal, James Mackintosh, Sir Robert Wilmot-Horton, 3rd Baronet, William Vesey-FitzGerald, 2nd Baron FitzGerald and Vesey, Edward Smith-Stanley, 14th Earl of Derby, James Stuart-Wortley, 1st Baron Wharncliffe, F. L. Gower, W. B. Baring, J. E. Denison, Thomas Hyde Villiers, M. Fitzgerald, T. Loch, Archibald Campbell, J. A. Fazakerley, T. Wallace, Dudley Ryder, 2nd Earl of Harrowby and Henry Labouchere, 1st Baron Taunton.

== Enquiry ==
The committee enquired upon four questions:

- Tenures of Land in Lower Canada
- Representative System of Lower Canada
- Constitutional Matters in Lower Canada
- Clergy Reserves in Upper Canada

== Report ==
The committee reported on July 22, 1828.

On the subject of the tenures of land, the committee recommended that:

- "the declaratory enactment in the Tenures Act, respecting lands held in free and common soccage, should be retained"
- lands in the Townships should be granted according to the law of England, and consequently that a system of registration should be established as in Upper Canada.
- "the clause in the Tenures Act which provides for the mutation of tenures" should be rendered operative, the seigneurial rights of the Crown should not be retained.
- the granting of lands following the English system should not interfere with the rights of "the descendants of the original settlers" to settle unoccupied lands according to the seigneurial tenure, "provided that such lands are apart from, and not intermixed with, the Townships."

On the subject of the representative system, the committee recommended that it be reformed to be modelled on that of Upper Canada, which according to them was "founded on the compound basis of territory and population." as opposed to population only.

On the subject of the constitution of Lower Canada, specifically the questions of the public revenue, and the maladministration, it recommended that:

- the Crown should concede the "placing [of] the receipt and expenditure of the whole Public Revenue under the superintendence and control of the House of Assembly".
- the salaries of the Governor, the Members of the Executive Council, and the Judges, should be made independent of the annual votes of the House of Assembly.
- that "steps should be taken, by efficient securities, and by regular audit of the accounts" to prevent the case of fraud involving Receiver-General Mr. Caldwel from recurring.
- that "precautions of the same nature" should be adopted for the Sheriffs

On the specific question of the composition of the Legislative Councils of both Provinces, it recommended:

- that these bodies be given a more independent character;
- that their Members should not in the majority consist of "persons holding offices at the pleasure of the Crown"
- that judges should not sit in their houses, the same for the Executive Councils, the Chief Justice only excepted

It recommended to follow the principle of limiting "as far as possible" the involvement of the British Parliament in any alteration in the constitution of the Canadas.

It recommended against the Union of the two Canadas.

Feeling a lack of information on the question of the estates formerly belonging to the Jesuits, it abstained from recommending anything. However, it expressed the opinion that it would seem desirable "that the proceeds should be applied to the purposes of general education."

On the subject of the clergy reserves in Upper Canada, it recommended:

- that the religious needs of colony's communities be secured by other means than a reserved of 1/7 of the lands of the Province
- that it be considered by the government to alienate these lands "subject to some fixed moderated reserve payment" after the first 10 or 15 years of occupation

== See also ==
- Royal Commission for the Investigation of all Grievances Affecting His Majesty's Subjects of Lower Canada (1835)
- Lower Canada Rebellion
- Constitutional history of Canada
