= Malachy McGurran =

Craigavon Borough Councillor
- In office 1977–1978
- Constituency: Craigavon Area A

Vice-President of Sinn Féin the Workers Party
- In office c. 1978

Personal details
- Born: c. 1938 Lurgan, County Armagh, Northern Ireland
- Died: 27 July 1978 (aged 39–40)
- Party: Sinn Féin the Workers Party (from 1969); Sinn Féin (until 1969)
- Other political affiliations: Northern Ireland Civil Rights Association

Military service
- Allegiance: Irish Republican Army (1955–1969); Official IRA (from 1969)
- Rank: Officer Commanding
- Battles/wars: Border Campaign; The Troubles

Malachy McGurran (1938 – 27 July 1978) was a leading Irish republican and founding member of the Northern Ireland Civil Rights Association, of which he was chairman.

A native of Lurgan, County Armagh, McGurran joined Sinn Féin and the Irish Republican Army in 1955. He was interned in the Curragh military barracks, near Dublin, from 1957 to 1959 during the IRA Border Campaign.

In 1969, at the time of the split in the Republican Movement, he became commander of the IRA in Northern Ireland, in an effort to head off the newly formed Provisional IRA. In 1970 he became chairman of the executive of Republican Clubs (the name adopted by Sinn Féin in Northern Ireland after it was banned in 1964). He represented Official Sinn Féin on a speaking tour of the United States in the early 1970s when the party was trying to promote its case and separate itself in the public mind from the Provisional IRA.

In 1977 McGurran was elected to Craigavon Borough Council for the Craigavon 'A' constituency, which included the northern parts of Lurgan and the Loughside areas. He polled 5,138 votes (8.2% of the total) as a Republican Clubs candidate in Armagh for the October 1974 Westminster election. He unsuccessfully contested the 1975 Constitutional Convention election.

Malachy McGurran was a vice-president of Sinn Féin the Workers Party when he died of bone cancer aged 38 on 27 July 1978.
