= Sir Robert Hamilton, 1st Baronet =

Sir Robert Hamilton, 1st Baronet (died 1703) was an Anglo-Irish official in Ireland.

Hamilton was appointed Custos Rotulorum of County Armagh in 1681. On 19 February 1683 he was created a baronet, of Mount Hamilton in the Baronetage of Ireland, by Charles II of England. In 1685 he was appointed as a member of the Privy Council of Ireland by James II of England.

He married Sarah Hamilton, the only child and heiress of Sir Hans Hamilton, 1st Baronet and Magdalene Trevor. Hamilton was succeeded in his title by his son, Hans Hamilton.

Honorary titles
Preceded by Sir Hans Hamilton, Bt	Custos Rotulorum of County Armagh; 1681–1692	Succeeded by Viscount Charlemont
Baronetage of Ireland
New creation	Baronet (of Mount Hamilton); 1683–1703	Succeeded by Hans Hamilton
