= Glacier rat =

Conservation status
- Vulnerable (IUCN 3.1)

Scientific classification
- Kingdom: Animalia
- Phylum: Chordata
- Class: Mammalia
- Order: Rodentia
- Family: Muridae
- Genus: Rattus
- Species: R. richardsoni

Binomial name
- Rattus richardsoni Tate, 1949

Synonyms
- Stenomys richardsoni (Tate, 1949)

Species of rodent

The glacier rat (Rattus richardsoni) is a species of rodent in the family Muridae. It is endemic to the New Guinea Highlands near Puncak Trikora (=Mt. Wilhelmina) and Puncak Jaya (=Carstensz Pyramid), West Papua, Indonesia. Its altitudinal range is 3,225–4,500 m (10,581–14,764 ft) above sea level.

== See also ==
- William Bebb Richardson
