= Microhydromys =

Scientific classification
- Domain: Eukaryota
- Kingdom: Animalia
- Phylum: Chordata
- Class: Mammalia
- Order: Rodentia
- Family: Muridae
- Subfamily: Murinae
- Tribe: Hydromyini
- Genus: Microhydromys; Tate & Archibold, 1941

Type species
- Microhydromys richardsoni

Species
- Microhydromys argenteus Microhydromys richardsoni

Genus of rodents

Microhydromys is a genus of rodent in the family Muridae. It contains the following species:

- Southern groove-toothed moss mouse (Microhydromys argenteus)
- Northern groove-toothed shrew mouse (Microhydromys richardsoni)
