= James Richardson (Liberal politician) =

Irish businessperson and politician

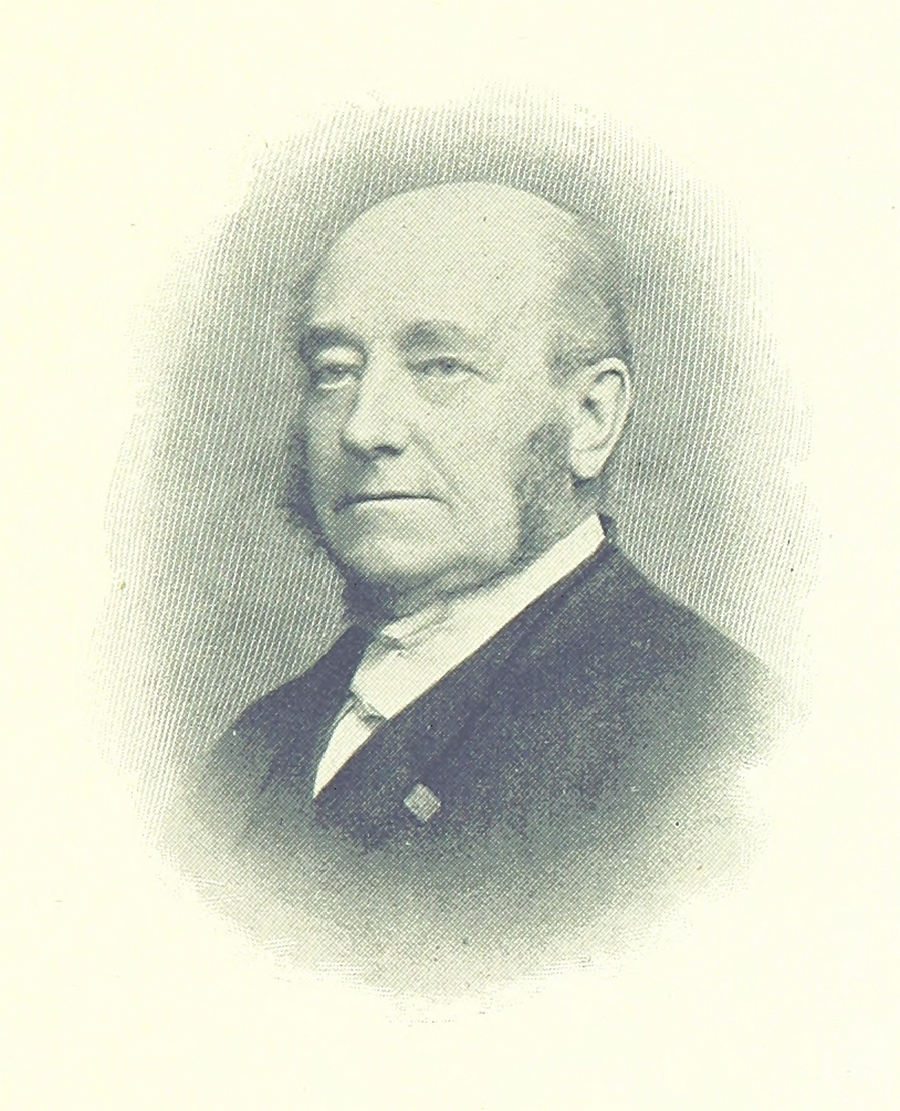
James N. Richardson

James Nicholson Richardson (7 February 1846 – 11 October 1921) was an Irish Liberal politician who sat in the House of Commons from 1880 to 1885.

Richardson was the son of John Grubb Richardson of Lisburn, County Antrim and Bessbrook, County Armagh, and his first wife Helena Grubb, daughter of Richard Grubb of Cahir Abbey, County Tipperary. He was educated at home until 1857 and then at Grove House Academy, a Quaker school in Tottenham. His mother died in 1849 during childbirth and his father remarried Jane Marion Wakefield; through the Wakefield family the Richardsons inherited their estate at Moyallon House, Gilford, County Down.

At the 1880 general election Richardson was elected member of parliament for Armagh and held the seat until 1885. He was a supporter of the interests of the tenant farmers of Ireland and a member of the Religious Society of Friends.

Richardson died at the age of 75 and is buried in the grounds of Bessbrook Friends' Meeting House, close to his home.

Richardson married Sophia Malcolmson, daughter of William Malcolmson of Portlaw in 1867. The couple honeymooned in Palestine and made their home at Mount Caulfield House, Bessbrook. Richardson would go on to sell 5,000 acres of his estate under the Wyndham Acts. He died at Malvern, England.

Parliament of the United Kingdom
Preceded by Edward Wingfield Verner; Maxwell Close	Member of Parliament for Armagh; 1880 – 1885; With: Maxwell Close	Constituency divided
