= Arthur Brownlow =

Anglo-Irish politician

Arthur Chamberlain Brownlow (20 March 1645 – 27 March 1711) was an Anglo-Irish politician.

He was the son of Patrick Chamberlain of County Louth, and Letitia (Lettice) Brownlow, eldest daughter of Sir William Brownlow (1591–1661), a High Sheriff of Armagh and his wife Eleanor O'Doherty (or O'Dougherty), daughter of the Irish rebel leader, Sir Cahir O'Doherty. He took his grandfather's family name as a condition of inheriting his estate.

He was educated at Trinity College Dublin. Like his grandfather, Brownlow was appointed High Sheriff of Armagh for 1668 and 1669, and represented County Armagh in the Irish House of Commons between 1689 and 1711. Brownlow was one of only six Protestant members to sit in the short-lived Patriot Parliament called by James II of England in 1689; he was cleared of any wrongdoing during the Irish Parliament of 1692.

He married Jane Hartstonge, daughter of Sir Standish Hartstonge, 1st Baronet and his first wife Elizabeth Jermyn. They had at least seven children, including William Brownlow, who like his father was MP for Armagh, and a daughter Lettice who married Robert Cope, MP and High Sheriff of Armagh.

Parliament of Ireland
Preceded by Hans Hamilton; Edward Richardson	Member of Parliament for County Armagh; 1689–1711; With: Walter Hovendon (1689); William Richardson (1692–1695); Sir Nicholas Acheson, Bt. (1695–1703); Sir Hans Hamilton, Bt. (1703–1711)	Succeeded by William Brownlow; Sir Hans Hamilton, Bt.
