= Max Clendinning =

Architect and designer from Northern Ireland (1924–2020)

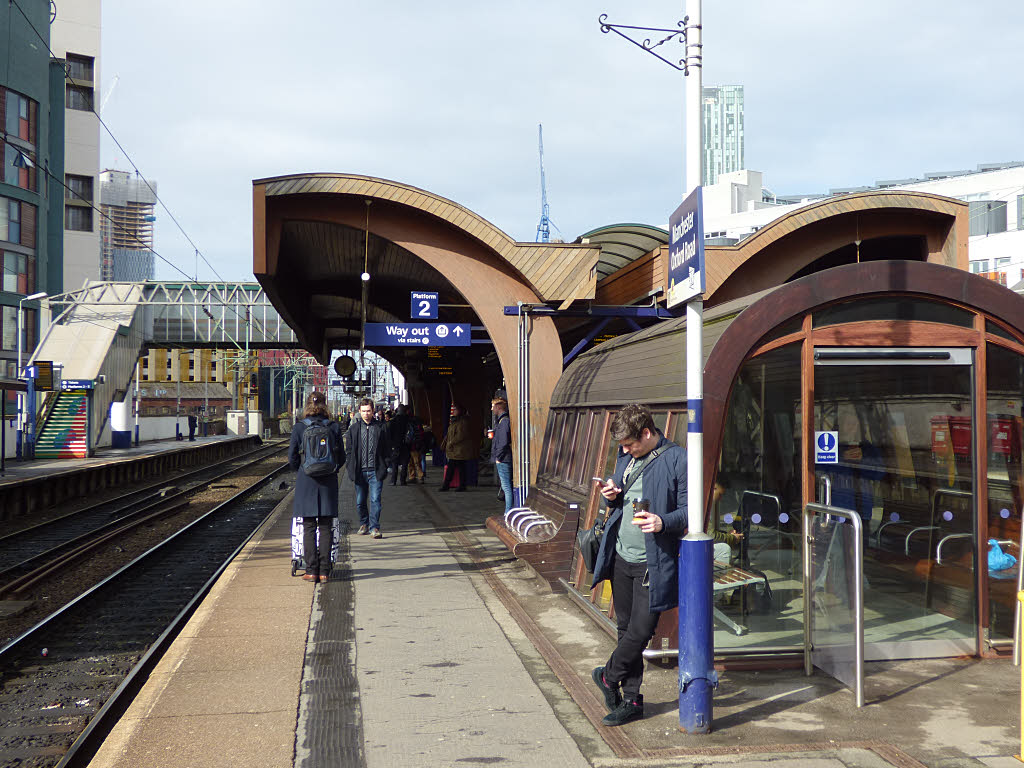
Platform shelters at Manchester Oxford Road station in 2018.

Walter Max Clendinning (26 September 1924 – 4 June 2020) was an architect, interior designer and furniture designer.

== Early life and education ==
Clendinning was born on 26 September 1924 in Richhill, County Armagh in Northern Ireland, the son of a furniture manufacturer. He attended Portadown College, a selective grammar school, where he was taught painting by Crawford Mitchell. He then studied at Belfast College of Art where his work included designing in the Baroque architecture style in the manner of Sir Christopher Wren.

Clendinning showed a aptitude for architecture, for which he was awarded the Sir Charles Lanyon prize.

== Career ==
In 1944 he joined the Belfast architectural practice of Henry Lynch Robinson, which included working on Festival of Britain buildings in Northern Ireland.

From 1951 Clendinning taught architectural design at Belfast College of Art, although at that stage he did not hold an architectural qualification. In 1951 we were awarded a scholarship to study at the Architectural Association in London, where he obtained the association's diploma and the ARIBA qualification in 1953.

Clendinning is best known for his 1965 design of the "slot-together but sturdy looking" Maxima chair, inspired in part by computer lettering. This design was featured in an exhibit at the Victoria & Albert Museum in 2012. He also created designs for Christian Dior and Liberty & Co. His architectural work included Manchester Oxford Road railway station (1960), which has innovative laminated timber roofs. The station was classified as a grade II listed building in 1995.

== Personal life ==
He lived in Islington, London, with the theatrical designer Ralph Adron, who had been his partner for forty years.
