= Ballymoyer House =

Country house in Northern Ireland

Coordinates: 54.2167°N 6.51667°W

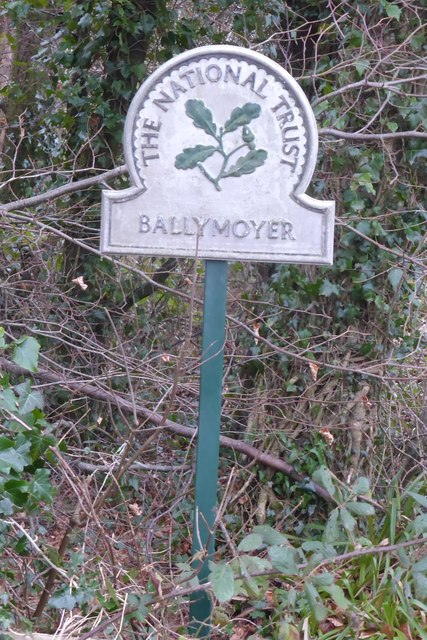
National Trust signage in the car park of Ballymoyer Forest Park

Ballymoyer House, now demolished, was an 18th-century country house in the townland of Ballintemple in the civil parish of Ballymoyer, County Armagh, Northern Ireland. The house stood in a 7000-acre demesne approximately 5 km (3 miles) north east of Newtownhamilton. The house was demolished in 1938. Some of the lands associated with the former estate are managed by the National Trust.

== History ==
The house, built in phases, comprised classical a 7-bay three-storey building with a stucco facade and a colonnaded porch which had been linked by corridors to a previous building. The older part housed a library, a number of smaller bedrooms and servants' quarters, while the newer part (a taller three-storey block) contained the main bedrooms, drawing room and dining room with a balustraded roof parapet.

The newer building was constructed in 1778 for Sir Walter Synnot of a family of linen merchants who had leased the land from the See of Armagh. He and his son Marcus improved the landscape to the extent that it was described in the Parliamentary Gazetter of 1844 as:

"The mansion built by Sir Walter Synnot and the demesne attached to it is laid out and planted in a tasteful style. Three mountain streams after debouching from the glens of their upper course, unite in the lawn and form a scene both beautiful and romantic".

By 1838, the family had bought the land. Sir Walter Synnot was High Sheriff of Armagh for 1783 and married Jane Seton. Marcus Synnot was High Sheriff in 1830 and died in 1835, succeeded by his son, also Marcus (High Sheriff in 1852). Marcus junior died childless in 1874 and the estate passed to his younger brother Mark Seton Synnot (High Sheriff in 1876). Mark Seton's son, also Mark Seton, a captain in the Armagh Light Infantry, died unmarried in 1901, whereby the estate devolved to his eldest sister Mary Susanna.

Mary Susanna had married in 1868 Major-General Arthur FitzRoy Hart, who had then adopted the surname Hart-Synnot. Their son, Brigadier-General Arthur Henry Seton Hart-Synnot inherited the demesne on his father's death in 1910 and sold portions of it to his tenants prior to 1919 under the Land Acts. He demolished part of the house c. 1918 after it had been damaged during requisitioning as military accommodation during World War I. The remaining avenue and glen were donated to the National Trust in 1938, and the remainder of Ballymoyer House was demolished by the Hart-Synnot family around the same time.

The surrounding land and a second house was purchased by a local businessman, Robert Bell, in 1940. As of 2015, the buildings and surrounding land still belonged to the Bell family and was registered with the Land Registry in the Bell name.
