= Harold McCusker =

British politician (1940–1990)

Harold McCusker MP

Member of Parliament for Upper Bann
- In office 9 June 1983 – 12 February 1990
- Preceded by: Seat created
- Succeeded by: David Trimble

Member of Parliament for Armagh
- In office 28 February 1974 – 13 May 1983
- Preceded by: John Maginnis
- Succeeded by: Seat abolished

Personal details
- Born: James Harold McCusker; 7 February 1940 Lurgan, Northern Ireland
- Died: 12 February 1990 (aged 50) Portadown, Northern Ireland
- Citizenship: United Kingdom
- Party: Ulster Unionist
- Spouse: Jennifer McCusker
- Children: 3
- Education: Stranmillis University College
- Occupation: Politician
- Profession: Teacher

James Harold McCusker (7 February 1940 – 12 February 1990) was a Northern Ireland Ulster Unionist Party politician who served as the Deputy Leader of the UUP Assembly Group from 1982 to 1986.

== Early life ==
The younger son of Jim and Lily McCusker (he had one older brother), he was born and raised in the heart of Lurgan. Educated at Lurgan Model Primary School, Lurgan College and Stranmillis University College, before qualifying as a teacher. Before entering politics he worked in industry, latterly with Goodyear, in their Craigavon Plant.

== Political career ==
He represented the Armagh constituency, and was first returned to the British House of Commons at the February 1974 general election. He was returned again in October 1974 and in the 1979 election, having supported the Callaghan government in the vote of no confidence that had toppled it. In 1982 he topped the poll in Armagh in the Assembly election.

At the 1983 general election, McCusker was returned for the new seat of Upper Bann. Alongside other Unionist MPs, he resigned his seat in protest at the Anglo-Irish Agreement in 1985, in order to contest his seat again at the ensuing by-election. He was returned again at the 1987 general election, which was to prove his last – he died of cancer in 1990, causing another by-election, which was won by future Ulster Unionist leader David Trimble.

== Personal life ==
McCusker was an Orangeman and staunch Unionist. He was married, with 3 sons, Moore, James and Colin. His youngest son, Colin (who was 18 at the time of his father's death), ran for the Northern Ireland Assembly in 2011, polling 3,402 first preference votes, but failed to get elected. He served on Craigavon Borough Council from February 2012 to March 2015 as an Ulster Unionist, and was elected the last Mayor of Craigavon in June 2014. Colin was elected to the new Armagh City, Banbridge and Craigavon Borough Council in May 2014.

Prior to his death from cancer in 1990, five days after his 50th birthday, McCusker was expected to rise further in the Ulster Unionist Party and British political scenes, due to his ability and popularity among his peers and the wider public. He was a member of the Lurgan Circuit of the Methodist Church in Ireland.

Parliament of the United Kingdom
Preceded by John Maginnis	Member of Parliament for Armagh; Feb 1974 – 1983	Constituency abolished
New constituency	Member of Parliament for Upper Bann; 1983 – 1990	Succeeded by David Trimble
Northern Ireland Assembly (1982)
New assembly	MPA for Armagh; 1982–1986	Assembly abolished
Party political offices
Vacant	Deputy Leader of the Ulster Unionist Party; 1982–1986	Vacant Office abolished Title next held by John Taylor
