= 1954 Armagh by-election =

UK parliamentary by-election

The 1954 Armagh by-election was held on 20 November 1954, following the resignation of Ulster Unionist Party (UUP) member of parliament Richard Harden. The by-election was won by the UUP's C. W. Armstrong, who was elected unopposed. This was, to date, the last uncontested Westminster election.

== Background ==
Richard Harden had held the seat of Armagh since a by-election in 1948, and had not faced a contest since then. The seat had been held continually by Ulster Unionists since its recreation for the 1922 general election. In 1954, Harden inherited a large estate in Wales and decided to retire from active politics. He vacated his Armagh seat by being appointed as the Crown Steward and Bailiff of the Manor of Northstead.

== Candidates ==
The Ulster Unionists stood C. W. Armstrong, the son of former Mid Armagh MP Henry Armstrong. He had served in the British Army in the Royal Engineers and the 36th (Ulster) Division. He had also been involved in the oil industry in Burma, serving from 1940 to 1942 in that country's House of Representatives.

The two main opposition groups, the Northern Ireland Labour Party and the Nationalist Party, had both fared poorly at the 1953 Northern Ireland general election and with a general feeling of disillusionment, decided not to contest the by-election.

== Result ==
With only one candidate for the seat, Armstrong was declared elected unopposed. This was the last unopposed election in any Westminster seat. Armstrong was sworn in as an MP on 23 November. He held the seat until the 1959 general election, when he stood down.
