= 1917 North Armagh by-election =

UK Parliamentary by-election

The 1917 North Armagh by-election was held on 22 November 1917. The by-election was held due to the incumbent Conservative MP, Sir William Moore, becoming a Judge of the High Court of Justice in Ireland. It was won by the Conservative candidate William Allen, who was unopposed.
