= William Bebb Richardson =

American mammalogist

William Bebb Richardson (29 February 1912, Pasadena, California – 25 January 2006, Lindsay, California) was an American mammalogist.

Richardson received his bachelor's degree in 1935 from the University of California, Berkeley. He participated in the Archbold 1938–1939 expedition to New Guinea.

== Associated eponyms for William Bebb Richardson ==
- Microhydromys richardsoni – Northern groove-toothed shrew mouse (or Richardson's shrew mouse)
- Rattus richardsoni – Glacier rat (or Richardson's mountain rat)
