= North Armagh (UK Parliament constituency) =

Parliamentary constituency in the United Kingdom, 1885–1922

- Former county constituency for the House of Commons

1885–1922
- Seats: 1
- Created from: Armagh
- Replaced by: Armagh

North Armagh was a UK Parliament constituency in Ireland which returned one Member of Parliament from 1885 to 1922, using the first past the post electoral system.

== Boundaries and boundary changes ==
This constituency comprised the northern part of County Armagh.

1885–1922: The barony of Oneilland East, and that part of the barony of Oneilland West contained within the parishes of Clonfeacle, Drumcree, Killyman, Newry and Tartaraghan, the parish of Loughgall excluding the townlands of Drumnasoo and Turcarra, and the townlands of Annaboe, Annahugh, Ballintaggart, Ballyhagan, Ballytrue, Ballywilly, Bottlehill, Castleraw, Clonroot, Creenagh, Derryloughan, Drumard Primate, Kilmacanty, Kilmore, Kincon, Lissheffield, Lurgancot, Money and Tullymore in the parish of Kilmore.

Until 1918 it was bounded to the north-east by South Antrim, to the north-west by East Tyrone, to the west by South Tyrone, to the south by Mid Armagh and to the east by West Down. From 1918 to 1922 the adjoining constituencies were the same, except that North-East Tyrone replaced East Tyrone.

Prior to the 1885 United Kingdom general election and from the dissolution of Parliament in 1922 the area was part of the Armagh constituency.

== Politics ==
The constituency was a predominantly Conservative then Unionist area. There were few contested elections. In 1918 the Unionists defeated Sinn Féin by about 3 to 1. This was the first contested election for the seat since a 1906 by-election.

== The First Dáil ==
Sinn Féin contested the 1918 general election on the platform that instead of taking up any seats they won in the United Kingdom Parliament, they would establish a revolutionary assembly in Dublin. In republican theory every MP elected in Ireland was a potential Deputy to this assembly. In practice only the Sinn Féin members accepted the offer.

The revolutionary First Dáil assembled on 21 January 1919 and last met on 10 May 1921. The First Dáil, according to a resolution passed on 10 May 1921, was formally dissolved on the assembling of the Second Dáil. This took place on 16 August 1921.

In 1921 Sinn Féin decided to use the UK authorised elections for the Northern Ireland House of Commons and the House of Commons of Southern Ireland as a poll for the Irish Republic's Second Dáil. Armagh North, in republican theory, was incorporated in a four-member Dáil constituency of Armagh.

== Members of Parliament ==
Election	Member	Party
1885	Rt Hon. Edward James Saunderson	Conservative
1891	Rt Hon. Edward James Saunderson	Irish Unionist
1906 (b)	William Moore	Irish Unionist
1917 (b)	William Allen	Irish Unionist
May 1921	William Allen	Ulster Unionist
1922	constituency abolished	

== Elections ==
=== Elections in the 1910s ===
1918 general election: North Armagh
Party	Candidate	Votes	%	±%
Irish Unionist	William Allen	10,239	78.2	N/A
Sinn Féin	Ernest Blythe	2,860	21.8	New
Majority		7,379	56.4	N/A
Turnout		13,099	67.1	N/A
Irish Unionist hold		Swing	N/A	

By-Election 22 November 1917: North Armagh
Party	Candidate	Votes	%	±%
Irish Unionist	William Allen	Unopposed		
Irish Unionist hold				

General election 6 December 1910: North Armagh
Party	Candidate	Votes	%	±%
Irish Unionist	William Moore	Unopposed		
Irish Unionist hold				

General election 18 January 1910: North Armagh
Party	Candidate	Votes	%	±%
Irish Unionist	William Moore	Unopposed		
Irish Unionist hold				

=== Elections in the 1900s ===
By-Election 16 November 1906: North Armagh
Party	Candidate	Votes	%	±%
Irish Unionist	William Moore	4,228	74.7	N/A
Ind. Unionist	Lindsay Crawford	1,433	25.3	New
Majority		2,795	49.4	N/A
Turnout		5,661	74.9	N/A
Registered electors		7,555		
Irish Unionist hold		Swing	N/A	

General election 16 January 1906: North Armagh
Party	Candidate	Votes	%	±%
Irish Unionist	Edward James Saunderson	Unopposed		
Irish Unionist hold				

General election 12 October 1900: North Armagh
Party	Candidate	Votes	%	±%
Irish Unionist	Edward James Saunderson	3,579	59.2	N/A
Ind. Unionist	James Orr	2,468	40.8	New
Majority		1,111	18.4	N/A
Turnout		6,047	60.4	N/A
Registered electors		10,014		
Irish Unionist hold		Swing	N/A	

=== Elections in the 1890s ===
General election 16 July 1895: North Armagh
Party	Candidate	Votes	%	±%
Irish Unionist	Edward James Saunderson	Unopposed		
Irish Unionist hold				

General election 6 July 1892: North Armagh
Party	Candidate	Votes	%	±%
Irish Unionist	Edward James Saunderson	Unopposed		
Irish Unionist hold				

=== Elections in the 1880s ===
General election 9 July 1886: North Armagh
Party	Candidate	Votes	%	±%
Irish Conservative	Edward James Saunderson	4,570	73.1	+9.2
Irish Parliamentary	James Williamson	1,677	26.8	New
Majority		2,893	46.3	+18.5
Turnout		6,247	78.6	−4.0
Registered electors		7,947		
Irish Conservative hold		Swing		

General election 30 November 1885: North Armagh
Party	Candidate	Votes	%	±%
Irish Conservative	Edward James Saunderson	4,192	63.9	
Liberal	Thomas Shillington	2,373	36.1	
Majority		1,819	27.8	
Turnout		6,565	82.6	
Registered electors		7,947		
Irish Conservative win (new seat)				

== See also ==
- List of UK Parliament Constituencies in Ireland and Northern Ireland
- List of MPs elected in the 1918 United Kingdom general election
