= Armagh (UK Parliament constituency) =

Parliamentary constituency in the United Kingdom, 1801–1885 and 1922–1983

Coordinates: 54.348°N 6.656°W

- Former county constituency for the House of Commons
- County: County Armagh

1922–1983
- Seats: 1
- Created from: Mid Armagh; North Armagh; South Armagh
- Replaced by: Newry and Armagh; Upper Bann

1801–1885
- Seats: 2
- Created from: County Armagh (IHC)
- Replaced by: Mid Armagh; North Armagh; South Armagh

Armagh or County Armagh is a former county constituency in the House of Commons of the United Kingdom. It was a two-member constituency in Ireland from 1801 to 1885 and a single-member constituency in Northern Ireland from 1922 to 1950. It was replaced in boundary changes in 1983.

== History and boundaries ==
County Armagh had been represented by two seats in the Irish House of Commons. From 1 January 1801, when the Acts of Union 1800 came into effect, it was represented by a county constituency with two MPs in the United Kingdom House of Commons. It consisted of County Armagh, except the parts in the parliamentary borough constituencies of Armagh City and Newry. The borough of Charlemont was disfranchised in 1801. The First Parliament of the United Kingdom in 1801 was composed of all members of the Parliament of Great Britain and members continuing from areas which were enfranchised in Ireland.

Catholics were excluded from taking seats until the enactment of the Roman Catholic Relief Act 1829. Under the Parliamentary Elections (Ireland) Act 1829, the traditional landowning qualification of Forty-shilling freeholders was changed to a £10 qualification, fivefold increase. Before the Representation of the People Act 1884, there was a restrictive property-based franchise. It was not until the householder franchise was introduced for county elections, in the electoral reforms which took effect in 1885, that most (but not all) adult males became voters. In these circumstances, most members of parliament came from a limited number of Protestant aristocratic and gentry families. There were few contested elections.

In the first half-century or so after the union, the constituency was fairly evenly balanced between Whig/Liberal and Tory/Conservative parties. Thereafter the area became more Conservative.

In 1885, under the Redistribution of Seats Act 1885, it was split into Mid Armagh, North Armagh and South Armagh.

In 1922, following the establishment of the Parliament of Northern Ireland, the number of seats in Northern Ireland at Westminster was cut from 30 to 13 under the Government of Ireland Act 1920. The single-seat constituency of Armagh consisted of the entirety of County Armagh. From its inception, Armagh had a unionist majority, though by the 1970s the nationalist vote was in the mid-30s%. In 1951, it was one of the last four seats to be uncontested in a UK general election, and in 1954 it saw the last uncontested by-election in the UK. In 1974 the Ulster Unionist Party repudiated the Sunningdale Agreement and so did not reselect the pro-Sunningdale MP, John Maginnis. Instead, they ran Harold McCusker, who held the seat until 1983. He was then elected for Upper Bann, which contained part of Armagh.

In 1983, when the number of constituencies in Northern Ireland was increased from 12 to 17, most of the constituency became part of Newry and Armagh, with part going to Upper Bann.

== Members of Parliament ==
Election	1st Member	1st Party	2nd Member	2nd Party
1801	Archibald Acheson	Non-partisan/Tory	Robert Camden Cope	Non-partisan
1802	Archibald Acheson	Non-partisan/Tory	Henry Caulfeild	Whig
1807	William Brownlow	Tory	William Richardson	Tory
1815	Henry Caulfeild	Whig	William Richardson	Tory
1818	Charles Brownlow	Whig	William Richardson	Tory
1820	Charles Brownlow	Whig	Henry Caulfeild	Whig
1830	Charles Brownlow	Whig	Archibald Acheson	Whig
1832	William Verner	Tory	Archibald Acheson	Whig
1834	William Verner	Conservative	Archibald Acheson	Whig
1847	William Verner	Conservative	James Caulfeild	Whig
1857	William Verner	Conservative	Maxwell Close	Conservative
1864	William Verner	Conservative	James Stronge	Conservative
1868	William Verner	Conservative	James Stronge	Conservative
1873	Edward Wingfield Verner	Conservative	James Stronge	Conservative
1874	Edward Wingfield Verner	Conservative	Maxwell Close	Conservative
1880	James Richardson	Liberal	Maxwell Close	Conservative
1885	Constituency abolished. See Mid Armagh, North Armagh and South Armagh			

Election	Member	Party
1922	Constituency recreated	
1922	Sir William Allen	Ulster Unionist
1948 by-election	Richard Harden	Ulster Unionist
1954 by-election	C. W. Armstrong	Ulster Unionist
1959	John Maginnis	Ulster Unionist
Feb 1974	Harold McCusker	Ulster Unionist
1983	Constituency abolished	

== Elections ==
In two-member elections, the bloc voting system was used. Voters could cast a vote for one or two candidates, as they chose. The two candidates with the largest number of votes were elected.

In by-elections to fill a single seat, the first past the post system applied.

After 1832, when registration of voters was introduced, a turnout figure is given for contested elections. In two-member elections, when the exact number of participating voters is unknown, this is calculated by dividing the number of votes by two. To the extent that voters did not use both their votes this will be an underestimate of turnout. If the electorate figure is unknown the last known electorate figure is used to provide an estimate of turnout.

Where a party had more than one candidate in one or both of a pair of successive elections change is calculated for each individual candidate, otherwise change is based on the party vote.

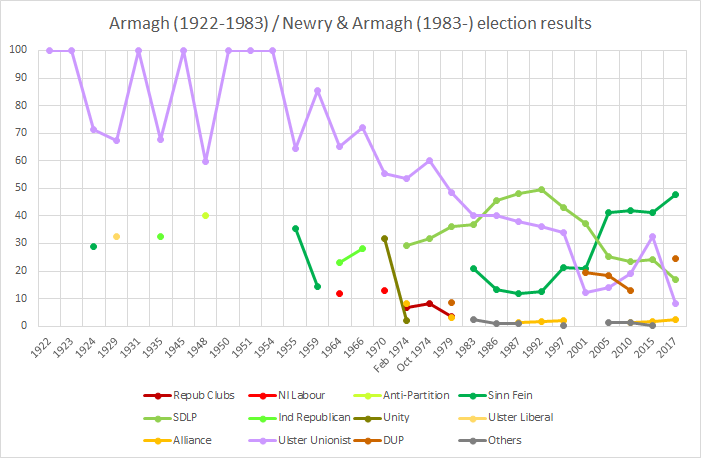
Armagh election results

=== Elections in the 19th century ===
Archibald Acheson and Robert Camden Cope were co-opted as non-partisans in 1801.
At the 1802 and 1806 general elections, Archibald Acheson and Henry Caulfeild were elected unopposed.
At the 1807 County Armagh by-election, Brownlow was elected unopposed.
At the 1807 general election, Richardson and Brownlow were elected unopposed.
At the 1812 general election, Richardson and William Brownlow were elected unopposed.
At the 1815 County Armagh by-election, Henry Caulfeild was elected unopposed.

=== Elections in the 1810s ===
General election 10 July 1818: Armagh (2 seats)
Party	Candidate	Votes	%	±%
Tory	Charles Brownlow	1,839	38.53	N/A
Tory	William Richardson	1,673	35.05	N/A
Whig	Henry Caulfeild	1,261	26.42	New
Majority		412	8.63	N/A
Turnout		4,773		N/A
Tory hold		Swing		
Tory hold		Swing		

=== Elections in the 1820s ===
At the 1820 general election, Charles Brownlow and Henry Caulfeild were elected unopposed.

General election 29 June 1826: Armagh (2 seats)
Party	Candidate	Votes	%	±%
Whig	Henry Caulfeild	2,897	35.84	N/A
Whig	Charles Brownlow	2,563	31.70	N/A
Tory	William Verner	1,894	23.43	New
Tory	John Ynyr Burgess	730	9.03	New
Majority		669	7.27	N/A
Turnout		8,084		N/A
Whig hold		Swing		
Whig hold		Swing		

=== Elections in the 1830s ===
General election 9 August 1830: Armagh (2 seats)
Party	Candidate	Votes	%
Whig	Charles Brownlow	Unopposed	
Whig	Archibald Acheson	Unopposed	
Whig hold			
Whig hold			

General election 11 May 1831: Armagh (2 seats)
Party	Candidate	Votes	%
Whig	Charles Brownlow	Unopposed	
Whig	Archibald Acheson	Unopposed	
Registered electors		1,361	
Whig hold			
Whig hold			

General election 19 December 1832: Armagh (2 seats)
Party	Candidate	Votes	%
Tory	William Verner	Unopposed	
Whig	Archibald Acheson	Unopposed	
Registered electors		3,342	
Tory gain from Whig			
Whig hold			

General election 15 January 1835: Armagh (2 seats)
Party	Candidate	Votes	%
Conservative	William Verner	Unopposed	
Whig	Archibald Acheson	Unopposed	
Registered electors		3,423	
Conservative hold			
Whig hold			

General election 7 August 1837: Armagh (2 seats)
Party	Candidate	Votes	%
Conservative	William Verner	Unopposed	
Whig	Archibald Acheson	Unopposed	
Registered electors		3,574	
Conservative hold			
Whig hold			

=== Elections in the 1840s ===
General election 9 July 1841: Armagh (2 seats)
Party	Candidate	Votes	%	±%
Conservative	William Verner	Unopposed		
Whig	Archibald Acheson	Unopposed		
Registered electors		2,578		
Conservative hold				
Whig hold				

General election 9 August 1847: Armagh (2 seats)
Party	Candidate	Votes	%	±%
Conservative	William Verner	Unopposed		
Whig	James Caulfeild	Unopposed		
Registered electors		3,054		
Conservative hold				
Whig hold				

=== Elections in the 1850s ===
General election 16 July 1852: Armagh (2 seats)
Party	Candidate	Votes	%	±%
Conservative	William Verner	Unopposed		
Whig	James Caulfeild	Unopposed		
Registered electors		4,341		
Conservative hold				
Whig hold				

General election 16 April 1857: Armagh (2 seats)
Party	Candidate	Votes	%	±%
Conservative	Maxwell Close	940	50.2	N/A
Conservative	William Verner	928	49.5	N/A
Whig	James Caulfeild	6	0.3	N/A
Majority		922	49.2	N/A
Turnout		937 (est)	16.7 (est)	N/A
Registered electors		5,596		
Conservative hold		Swing	N/A	
Conservative gain from Whig		Swing	N/A	

General election 7 May 1859: Armagh (2 seats)
Party	Candidate	Votes	%	±%
Conservative	Maxwell Close	Unopposed		
Conservative	William Verner	Unopposed		
Registered electors		5,805		
Conservative hold				
Conservative hold				

=== Elections in the 1860s ===
By-election, 23 March 1863: Armagh
Party	Candidate	Votes	%	±%
Conservative	James Stronge	Unopposed		
Conservative hold				

- Caused by Close's resignation.

General election, 19 July 1865: Armagh
Party	Candidate	Votes	%	±%
Conservative	James Stronge	Unopposed		
Conservative	William Verner	Unopposed		
Registered electors		5,721		
Conservative hold				
Conservative hold				

General election, 21 November 1868: Armagh
Party	Candidate	Votes	%	±%
Conservative	James Stronge	Unopposed		
Conservative	William Verner	Unopposed		
Registered electors		7,443		
Conservative hold				
Conservative hold				

=== Elections in the 1870s ===
By-election, 15 February 1873: Armagh
Party	Candidate	Votes	%	±%
Conservative	Edward Wingfield Verner	Unopposed		
Registered electors				
Conservative hold				

- Caused by Verner's death.

General election 7 February 1874: Armagh (2 seats)
Party	Candidate	Votes	%	±%
Conservative	Edward Wingfield Verner	3,527	40.7	N/A
Conservative	Maxwell Close	3,469	40.0	N/A
Liberal	Frederick William McBlaine	1,673	19.3	New
Majority		1,796	20.7	N/A
Turnout		5,171 (est)	73.4 (est)	N/A
Registered electors		7,044		
Conservative hold				
Conservative hold				

=== Elections in the 1880s ===
General election 9 April 1880: Armagh (2 seats)
Party	Candidate	Votes	%	±%
Liberal	James Richardson	2,738	29.0	+9.7
Conservative	Maxwell Close	2,654	28.1	−11.9
Conservative	St John Thomas Blacker	2,275	24.1	N/A
Conservative	William Verner	1,781	18.9	−21.8
Turnout		4,724 (est)	68.1 (est)	−5.3
Registered electors		6,937		
Majority		957	10.1	N/A
Liberal gain from Conservative		Swing	+10.8	
Conservative hold		Swing		

=== Elections in the 1920s ===
1922 general election: Armagh
Party	Candidate	Votes	%	±%
UUP	William Allen	Unopposed		
UUP hold				

1923 general election: Armagh
Party	Candidate	Votes	%	±%
UUP	William Allen	Unopposed		
UUP hold				

1924 general election: Armagh
Party	Candidate	Votes	%	±%
UUP	William Allen	29,021	71.2	N/A
Sinn Féin	James McKee	11,756	28.8	New
Majority		17,265	42.4	N/A
Turnout		40,777	75.0	N/A
UUP hold		Swing		

1929 general election: Armagh
Party	Candidate	Votes	%	±%
UUP	William Allen	29,966	67.4	−3.8
Ulster Liberal	William Todd	13,052	32.6	New
Majority		13,914	34.8	−7.6
Turnout		40,018	60.2	−14.8
UUP hold		Swing		

=== Elections in the 1930s ===
1931 general election: Armagh
Party	Candidate	Votes	%	±%
UUP	William Allen	Unopposed		
UUP hold				

1935 general election: Armagh
Party	Candidate	Votes	%	±%
UUP	William Allen	34,002	67.6	N/A
Ind. Republican	Charles McGleenan	16,284	32.4	New
Majority		17,718	35.2	N/A
Turnout		50,286	73.3	N/A
UUP hold		Swing		

=== Elections in the 1940s ===
1945 general election: Armagh
Party	Candidate	Votes	%	±%
UUP	William Allen	Unopposed		
UUP hold				

1948 Armagh by-election
Party	Candidate	Votes	%	±%
UUP	Richard Harden	36,200	59.7	N/A
Anti-Partition	James O'Reilly	24,422	40.3	New
Majority		12,314	20.4	N/A
Turnout		60,622		N/A
UUP hold		Swing		

=== Elections in the 1950s ===
1950 general election: Armagh
Party	Candidate	Votes	%	±%
UUP	Richard Harden	Unopposed		
Registered electors				
UUP hold				

1951 general election: Armagh
Party	Candidate	Votes	%	±%
UUP	Richard Harden	Unopposed		
Registered electors				
UUP hold				

1954 Armagh by-election
Party	Candidate	Votes	%	±%
UUP	C. W. Armstrong	Unopposed		
Registered electors				
UUP hold				

1955 general election: Armagh
Party	Candidate	Votes	%	±%
UUP	C. W. Armstrong	38,617	64.4	N/A
Sinn Féin	Tomás Mac Curtain	21,363	35.6	New
Majority		17,254	28.8	N/A
Turnout		59,980	82.7	N/A
UUP hold		Swing		

1959 general election: Armagh
Party	Candidate	Votes	%	±%
UUP	John Maginnis	40,325	85.5	+21.1
Sinn Féin	John Lynch	6,823	14.5	−21.1
Majority		33,502	71.0	+42.2
Turnout		47,148	64.2	−18.5
UUP hold		Swing		

=== Elections in the 1960s ===
1964 general election: Armagh
Party	Candidate	Votes	%	±%
UUP	John Maginnis	35,223	65.0	−20.5
Ind. Republican	John Lynch	12,432	23.0	+8.5
NI Labour	Samuel Ewart	6,523	12.0	New
Majority		22,791	42.0	−29.0
Turnout		54,178	73.0	−8.8
UUP hold		Swing		

1966 general election: Armagh
Party	Candidate	Votes	%	±%
UUP	John Maginnis	34,687	72.0	+7.0
Ind. Republican	Charles McGleenan	13,467	28.0	+5.0
Majority		21,220	44.0	+2.0
Turnout		48,154	63.3	−9.7
UUP hold		Swing		

=== Elections in the 1970s ===
1970 general election: Armagh
Party	Candidate	Votes	%	±%
UUP	John Maginnis	37,667	55.3	−16.7
Unity	Hugh Lewis	21,696	31.9	New
NI Labour	Erskine Holmes	8,781	12.9	New
Majority		15,971	23.4	−20.6
Turnout		68,144	78.4	+15.1
UUP hold		Swing		

February 1974 general election: Armagh
Party	Candidate	Votes	%	±%
UUP	Harold McCusker	33,194	53.7	−1.6
SDLP	Paddy O'Hanlon	18,090	29.3	New
Alliance	Robin Glendinning	4,983	8.1	New
Republican Clubs	Thomas Moore	4,129	6.7	New
Unity	Hugh Lewis	1,364	2.2	−29.7
Majority		15,104	24.4	+1.0
Turnout		61,760	68.4	−10.0
UUP hold		Swing		

October 1974 general election: Armagh
Party	Candidate	Votes	%	±%
UUP	Harold McCusker	37,518	60.0	+6.3
SDLP	Seamus Mallon	19,855	31.8	+2.5
Republican Clubs	Malachy McGurran	5,138	8.2	+1.5
Majority		17,663	28.2	+3.8
Turnout		62,511	68.6	+0.2
UUP hold		Swing		

1979 general election: Armagh
Party	Candidate	Votes	%	±%
UUP	Harold McCusker	31,668	48.5	−11.5
SDLP	Seamus Mallon	23,545	36.1	+4.3
DUP	Davy Calvert	5,634	8.6	New
Republican Clubs	Thomas Moore	2,310	3.5	−4.7
Alliance	William Ramsay	2,074	3.2	New
Majority		8,123	12.4	−15.8
Turnout		65,231	70.1	+1.5
UUP hold		Swing		
