= Drumbanagher House =

Former country house in County Armagh, Northern Ireland

Coordinates: 54.2667°N 6.3833°W

Drumbanagher House (also known as Drumbanagher Castle and Closes Castle), near Poyntzpass, County Armagh, was a large country house in Northern Ireland designed for Maxwell Close by William Notman, working under William Playfair in 1829, being "one of his grandest country houses."

Following occupation by the American and British armies during World War Two, Drumbanagher was demolished by its owner in 1951 due to the expense in up keeping the property; the estate remains in the possession of the Close family. Writing in the Belfast Telegraph in 1962 the then owner said;

"No mortal could have afforded to keep the castle going. So I had it demolished. Death duties, upkeep and financial difficulties meant I just had to get rid of it...It was perfectly sound and in good order when it was demolished...Now it looks like a nuclear bomb hit it."

All that remains of the house is the "vast arched porte-cochere" (Bence-Jones), which Sir Charles Brett described as "resembling a Roman Arc de Triomphe."
