= C. W. Armstrong =

N.Ireland politician (1899–1986)

Christopher Wyborne Armstrong (9 May 1899 – 8 July 1986) was a politician and colonial administrator from Northern Ireland. He was an Ulster Unionist member of parliament (MP) for Armagh from a by-election in 1954 until he stood down at the 1959 general election.

The son of Henry Armstrong MP, of Dean's Hill, Armagh, he married Hilde Kolz, with whom he had a son and daughter. He studied at Winchester College and Trinity College, Cambridge, where he read history. After serving in France during the Great War, he was an employee of the Burmah Oil Company for most of the inter-war period, returning to serve with the British Expeditionary Force during its brief existence at the start of the Second World War. Back in Burma, he became a member of that country's House of Representatives in 1942 and was appointed a controller of the petroleum industry in the same year. From 1945 to 1946 he was Commissioner of the Magwe (Magway) region.

Once his duties in Burma had finished he took over a farm in Kenya. However, in 1954 he was selected to represent Armagh in the House of Commons. During his spell as a parliamentarian he was a member of British delegations to the Council of Europe and the Western European Union. After standing down in 1959 he returned to farm at Gilgil in Kenya.

His son, Simon Armstrong, married a daughter and co-heir of Diana Miller, Countess of Mértola.

== Footnotes ==
Parliament of the United Kingdom
Preceded by Richard Harden	Member of Parliament for Armagh; 1954–1959	Succeeded by John Maginnis
