= James Caulfeild, 3rd Earl of Charlemont =

British politician (1820-92)

James Molyneux Caulfeild, 3rd Earl of Charlemont KP (6 October 1820 – 12 January 1892) was an Irish politician and peer.

He was the son of Hon. Henry Caulfeild, younger son of James Caulfeild, 1st Earl of Charlemont, and Elizabeth Margaret Browne. Charlemont was educated at Trinity College, Cambridge. He was appointed High Sheriff of Armagh for 1842 and held the office of Whig Member of Parliament (MP) for County Armagh between 1847 and 1857. He was Lord Lieutenant of County Armagh between 1849 and 1864.

He succeeded to the title of 3rd Earl of Charlemont, amongst the other peerages, on 26 December 1863 on the death of his uncle Francis. He was Lord Lieutenant of County Tyrone between 1864 and 1892 and was made a Knight of St Patrick on 28 December 1865.

Lord Charlemont married on two occasions;

- Hon. Elizabeth Jane Somerville, daughter of William Meredyth Somerville, 1st Baron Meredyth and Lady Maria Harriet Conyngham, on 18 December 1856.
- Anna Lucy Lambart, daughter of Reverend Charles James Lambart and Marian Smith, on 10 May 1883 at the British Consulate, Pau, France.

He had no issue and the title died with him. He owned almost 27,000 acres, mostly in Armagh and Tryone.

He died in Biarritz, France, and was buried in St Patrick's Cathedral, Armagh.

Parliament of the United Kingdom
Preceded by Viscount Acheson; Sir William Verner, Bt	Member of Parliament for County Armagh; 1847–1857; With: Sir William Verner, Bt	Succeeded by Sir William Verner, Bt; Maxwell Charles Close
Honorary titles
Preceded by The 2nd Earl of Gosford	Lord Lieutenant of Armagh; 1849–1864	Succeeded by The 3rd Earl of Gosford
Preceded by The Earl of Charlemont	Lord Lieutenant of Tyrone; 1864–1892	Succeeded by The Earl Belmore
Peerage of Ireland
Preceded by Francis Caulfeild	Earl of Charlemont; 1863–1892	Extinct
Preceded by Francis Caulfeild	Viscount Charlemont; 1863–1892	Succeeded by James Caulfeild
Peerage of the United Kingdom
Preceded by Francis Caulfeild	Baron Charlemont; 1863–1892	Extinct
