= William Allen (Armagh MP) =

Northern Irish unionist politician

Lieutenant Colonel Sir William Allen KBE DSO
- Allen in 1923

Member of Parliament for Armagh
- In office 1922–1947
- Preceded by: New constituency
- Succeeded by: Richard Harden

Member of Parliament for North Armagh
- In office 1917–1922
- Preceded by: Sir William Moore
- Succeeded by: Constituency abolished

Personal details
- Born: 15 October 1866
- Died: 20 December 1947 (aged 81)
- Spouses: Maria Ross (m. 1892; died 1937); Lillah Irene (m. 1938)
- Children: 2
- Education: Lurgan College

Lt Col Sir William James Allen KBE DSO (15 October 1866 – 20 December 1947) was a Northern Irish unionist politician, soldier and businessman.

== Early life ==
The son of Joseph and Catherine Allen, Allen was educated at Lurgan College. His father Joseph was co-founder in 1868 of Johnston, Allen & Co. linen manufacturers. After his father died in 1890, Allen inherited the partnership. This lasted until 1905, when it was dissolved (the factory retained the name Johnston Allen) as Allen left to set up his own linen business, the Windsor factory.

== Military career ==
He served as Sovereign Grand Master of the Royal Black Institution (RBI) in recognition for his efforts towards the purchase of Brownlow House which became the world headquarters for the institution. An illuminated address was presented to him by his District Lodge which still hangs in the dining room of Brownlow House beside his portrait, painted by Frank McKelvey. Allen, together with Hugh Hayes, John Mehaffey, George Lunn Junior and James Malcolm Junior, were named as its first trustees.

The House was a venue for the signing of the Ulster Covenant, a cause Allen promoted vigorously, against what he viewed as the imposition by the British Government of the Third Home Rule Bill. Brownlow House also subsequently became his military HQ from 14 November 1914 onwards, where Allen helped raise and organise the basic training of the 16th (Pioneer) Battalion Royal Irish Rifles. He later served as its commanding officer. He arrived with them at Boulogne in Northern France from their training camp in Seaford, East Sussex on 1 October 1915.

He was appointed a Companion of the Distinguished Service Order in 1918 and mentioned in despatches four times. He was also appointed chevalier of the Legion of Honour.

== Political career ==
From 1913 to 1914 Allen was a key supporter of Lord Edward Carson of Duncairn and Sir James Craig in their campaign against the third Home Rule Bill. He was also elected Deputy Grand Master of the Orange Order and also held the post of Honorary Secretary of the Ulster Unionist Council from 1907 on.

He was elected to the House of Commons of the United Kingdom at a by-election in 1917, as an Irish Unionist Party Member of Parliament (MP) for North Armagh, and retained his seat at the 1918 general election. The constituency was abolished for the 1922 general election, when he was re-elected as a member of the new Ulster Unionist Party for the new Armagh constituency. On 22 June 1921, he was one of several officers invested as Knight Commander of the Order of the British Empire (KBE) to mark the visit of King George V and Queen Mary of Teck to officially open the new Parliament of Northern Ireland.

== Personal life ==
Allen was twice married, first in 1892 to Maria (eldest daughter of Mr and Mrs John Ross). They had a son and daughter. Maria died in 1937 and in 1938 he was remarried, to Lillah Irene, daughter of the late R.H. Forsythe. Allen died in 1947, two weeks after being knocked down by a motor van while alighting from a tram on the Lisburn Road, Belfast, on 5 December. He was 81 and the second oldest MP in the House of Commons. Allen was buried in Lurgan and was survived by his second wife Lillah Irene, Lady Allen.

Parliament of the United Kingdom
Preceded by Sir William Moore	Member of Parliament for North Armagh; 1917–1922	Succeeded by Himself as MP for Armagh
New constituency made from three existing constituencies	Member of Parliament for Armagh; 1922–1947	Succeeded by Richard Harden
Non-profit organization positions
Preceded by William Lyons	Sovereign Grand Master of the Royal Black Preceptory; 1924–1947	Succeeded by Sir Norman Stronge
