= William Richardson (Cambridge University cricketer) =

English schoolmaster and sportsman

William Percival Richardson (25 February 1861 – 13 June 1933) was an English schoolmaster and a sportsman who played one game of first-class cricket for Cambridge University and also won a Blue for rugby. He was born at Great Barford, Bedfordshire and died at Littlestone-on-Sea, Kent.

Richardson was educated at Clifton College and Christ's College, Cambridge. He was in the cricket team at Clifton, but at Cambridge he was given only a single match: in the game against Lancashire in 1882 he scored 8 and 0 as a lower-order right-handed batsman and held one catch as a wicketkeeper. He was awarded a Blue for rugby football in 1883.

Richardson graduated from Cambridge University with a Bachelor of Arts degree in 1884. He became a schoolmaster, serving as assistant master at Blairlodge School at Polmont, Stirlingshire from 1884 to 1898 and at Warwick School from 1898 to 1905; he then became headmaster of St Chad's Preparatory School at Prestatyn in north Wales from 1905.
