= Richard Harden (politician) =

Northern Irish politician (1916–2000)

Major James Richard Edwards Harden OBE DSO MC (12 December 1916 – 22 October 2000), known as Richard Harden, was a Northern Irish politician. Born in Tandragee, County Armagh and educated at Bedford School and the Royal Military College, Sandhurst. He was an Ulster Unionist Member of Parliament for Armagh from a by-election in 1948 until he resigned his seat on 5 November 1954 by the procedural device of accepting the nominally-paid position of Steward of the Manor of Northstead.

== Notes ==
Parliament of the United Kingdom
Preceded by Sir William Allen	Member of Parliament for Armagh; 1948–1954	Succeeded by C. W. Armstrong
