= 1948 Armagh by-election =

UK parliamentary by-election

The 1948 Armagh by-election was held on 5 March 1948, following the death of Ulster Unionist Party member of parliament William Allen.

Allen had held the seat of Armagh since its recreation for the 1922 UK general election. He had often been elected without a contest; the last election at which he had faced an opponent was in 1935, where he had taken 67.6% of the vote against Charles McGleenan, an independent Irish republican candidate.

== Candidates ==
The Ulster Unionists selected Richard Harden, a former major in the British Army who had acted as senior liaison officer to Montgomery from early 1944. In 1947, he had left the Army to manage his family estate in County Antrim.

The Northern Ireland Labour Party had achieved some strong results in recent years, but had never stood in Armagh, and decided not to put forward a candidate for the by-election.

McGleenan was a founder member of the Irish Anti-Partition League, and the organisation decided to make Armagh its first contest. It stood James O'Reilly, a farmer and a Nationalist Party member of Kilkeel Rural District Council.

== Result ==
Harden won the by-election, taking 59.7% of the votes cast. O'Reilly took 40.3%, the best result for any opposition candidate in the constituency.

Geoffrey Bing stated in Parliament that impersonation took place at one polling station on "a really large scale", and that two election agents who arrived to investigate were attacked by a mob of two hundred people. Harden, in response, noted that O'Reilly had agreed with him that, despite some incidents at the close of polling, the election was fair, and that he had seconded his vote of thanks to the returning officer.

Harden held the seat without facing a further contest. He inherited a further estate in Pwllheli in 1954 and stood down as an MP, leading to the 1954 Armagh by-election.

Armagh by-election, 1948
Party	Candidate	Votes	%	±%
UUP	Richard Harden	36,200	59.7	N/A
Anti-Partition	James O'Reilly	24,422	40.3	New
Majority		12,314	20.4	N/A
Turnout		60,622		N/A
UUP hold		Swing		
