= William Henry Richardson =

American physician

William Henry Richardson (December 5, 1808 – December 14, 1878) was an American medical doctor and politician.

Richardson, only son of Levi and Amelia (Trumbull) Richardson, was born in Chaplin, then a part of Mansfield, Connecticut, December 5, 1808. At an early age he moved with his parents to North Mansfield, Connecticut, where he resided much the greater part of his life. He pursued his medical studies, first with Dr. Archibald Welch of Mansfield, subsequently with Dr. Samuel B. Woodward of Wethersfield and Dr. Silas Fuller of Columbia, and at the medical school of Yale College, from which he graduated in 1834. On graduating, he returned to Mansfield and entered on the practice of his profession, which he followed for more than forty years. After three years of impaired health, he died from disease of the brain, December 14, 1878, aged 70 years.

In 1862, he was a member of the Connecticut State Legislature. For many years he served as School Visitor.

He married in 1853 Abigail, daughter of Edmund Freeman, of Mansfield. Thry became the parents on one child.
