= John Maginnis =

John Edward Maginnis (7 March 1919 – 7 July 2001) was a Northern Irish politician. He was Ulster Unionist Member of Parliament for Armagh from 1959 until he stood down at the February 1974 general election. He stood unsuccessfully for the Unionist Party of Northern Ireland at the 1975 election to the Northern Ireland Constitutional Convention.

Educated at Moyallon School and Portadown Technical College, he lived and farmed at Mandeville Hall, Tandragee.

Parliament of the United Kingdom
Preceded by C. W. Armstrong	Member of Parliament for Armagh; 1959–February 1974	Succeeded by Harold McCusker
