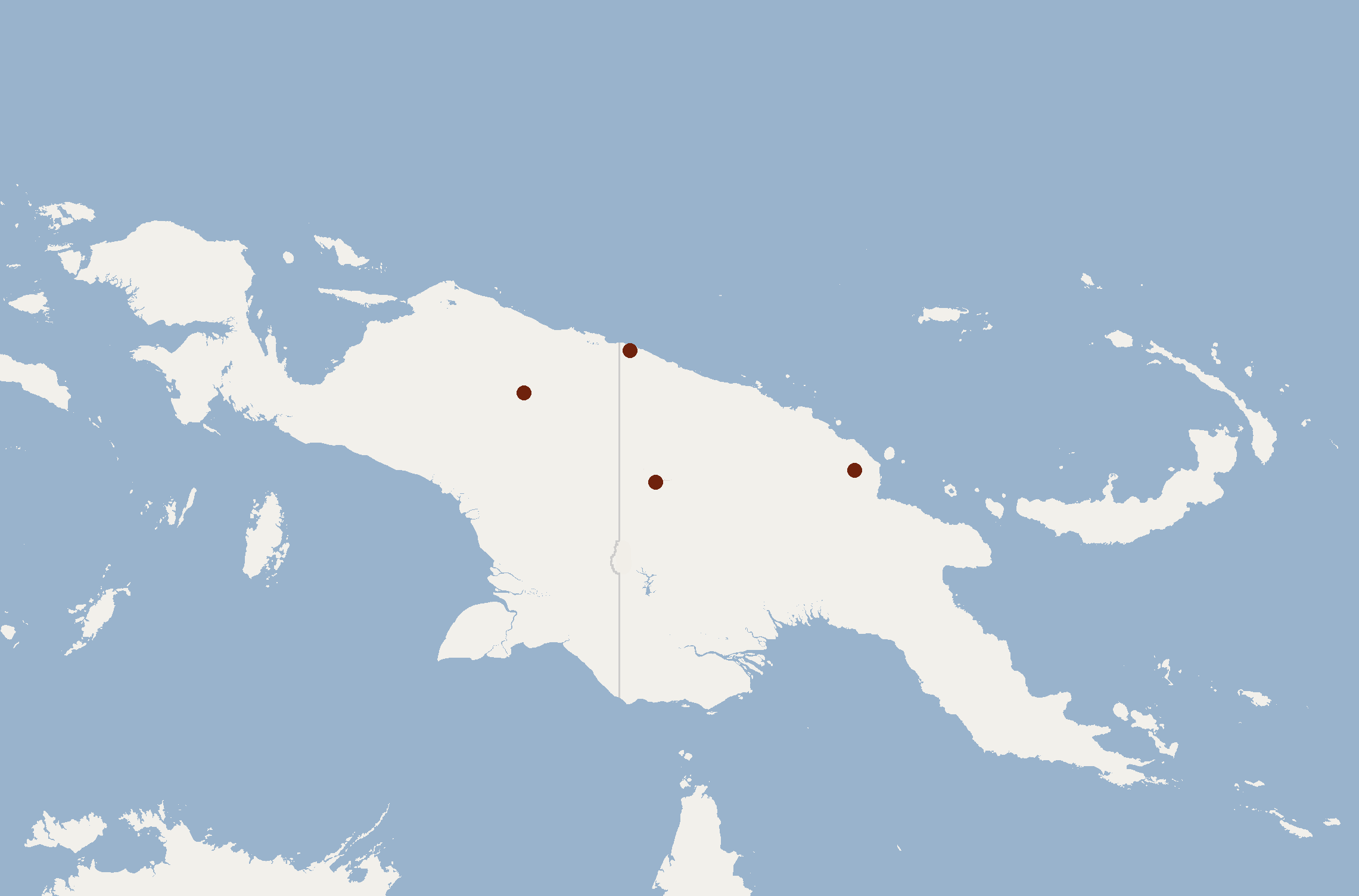

Conservation status
- Data Deficient (IUCN 3.1)

Scientific classification
- Kingdom: Animalia
- Phylum: Chordata
- Class: Mammalia
- Order: Rodentia
- Family: Muridae
- Genus: Microhydromys
- Species: M. richardsoni

Binomial name
- Microhydromys richardsoni Tate & Archbold, 1941

= Northern groove-toothed shrew mouse =

Species of rodent

The northern groove-toothed shrew mouse (Microhydromys richardsoni) is a species of rodent in the family Muridae found in West Papua, Indonesia and Papua New Guinea.

== See also ==
- William Bebb Richardson
