= John Charters Boyle =

Politician from Northern Ireland

Northern Ireland Senator
- In office 1937 – 10 May 1950

High Sheriff of Armagh
- In office 1926
- Preceded by: Thomas Henry White
- Succeeded by: Samuel Alexander Bell

Personal details
- Born: August 5, 1869 Charlemont Place, Armagh, Ireland
- Died: May 10, 1950 (aged 80) Desart, Armagh, County Armagh, Northern Ireland
- Party: Ulster Unionist Party
- Spouse: Dorothea Gertrude Armstrong (1888-1960) (m. 1914)
- Parents: Jane Boomer Charters (Boyle); Hugh Boyle
- Education: Cheltenham College
- Alma mater: Royal Indian Engineering College
- Occupation: Surveyor

Military service
- Allegiance: United Kingdom
- Branch/service: Royal Engineers
- Years of service: ? - ≥1922
- Rank: Major
- Unit: 150th Field Company
- Battles/wars: First World War
- Awards: Mentioned in despatches

John Charters Boyle (5 August 1869 - 10 May 1950) was a unionist politician and surveyor in Northern Ireland.

Boyle studied at Cheltenham College and the Royal Indian Engineering College, before working as a surveyor. During the First World War, he served in the 150th Field Company of the Royal Engineers, and was mentioned in despatches. He remained in the military, and was reportedly still in the military in 1922. In 1926, he was appointed as High Sheriff of Armagh. In 1937, he was elected to the Senate of Northern Ireland as an Ulster Unionist Party representative, despite having no previous political experience. He served until his death in 1950.
