= William Richardson (1710–1758) =

Irish landowner and politician

William Richardson (1710 – 1758) was an Irish landowner from Richhill, County Armagh.

He was High Sheriff of Armagh in 1737 and represented County Armagh in the Irish House of Commons from 1739 to his death.

He was the son of John Richardson, High Sheriff in 1715 and his wife Anne Beckett, daughter of William Beckett, Second Serjeant, and father of William Richardson, High Sheriff in 1773 and MP for Armagh 1783–1797.
