= William Richardson (1749–1822) =

Irish landowner and politician (1749–1822)

William Richardson (1749 – 23 March 1822) was an Irish landowner and Member of Parliament.

He was the son of William Richardson (1710–1758) of Rich Hill, County Armagh, Ireland and succeeded him to the Richhill estate when only a minor. He was the great-nephew of another William Richardson, who was Member of Parliament for County Armagh at the time of the Williamite War in Ireland.

He was elected High Sheriff of Armagh in 1777 and sat in the Irish House of Commons for County Armagh, between 1783 and 1797. In 1807 he was elected to sit for County Armagh in the House of Commons of the United Kingdom, serving until 1820.

In 1775 Richardson married Dorothea ("Dolly") Monroe (b. 1754), a daughter of Henry Monroe of Roes Hall, Tullylish. She was a noted beauty who while staying in Dublin with her aunt Frances, Lady Loftus, had been courted by Henry Grattan, Sir Hercules Langrishe, Francis Andrews, Provost of Trinity College, and the recently widowed Viceroy Lord Townshend. She had also been painted by Angelica Kauffman and alluded to in a poem by Oliver Goldsmith. Richardson and Dorothea had no children. She died in 1793, aged thirty-nine.

The following year Richardson married Louisa Magenis, daughter of Richard Magenis of Waringstown. They had three daughters, Elizabeth, Isabella and Louisa, who jointly inherited Richhill on their father's death. Only the youngest daughter married (to Edward Bacon, sometime High Sheriff of Armagh), and when she died without heirs in 1881 the estate passed to the Richardsons of Rossfad, near Ballinamallard in County Fermanagh.

Parliament of the United Kingdom
Preceded by Henry Caulfeild; William Brownlow	Member of Parliament for County Armagh; 1807 – 1820; With: William Brownlow to 1815; Henry Caulfeild 1815–1818; Charles Brownlow from 1818	Succeeded by Charles Brownlow; Henry Caulfeild
