= Henry Caulfeild =

Irish politician

Henry Caulfeild (1779–1862) was an Irish politician.

Henry Caulfeild was the second and youngest son of James Caulfeild, 1st Earl of Charlemont. He was educated at Trinity College, Dublin and represented Armagh in the Parliament of the United Kingdom from 1802 to 1806, again from 1815 to 1818, and finally from 1820 to 1830.

He married Elizabeth Margaret Browne on 30 August 1819; they were the parents of James Molyneux Caulfeild, 3rd Earl of Charlemont.
