= Robert Camden Cope =

British Member of Parliament

Robert Camden Cope (1771 – 5 December 1818) was a British politician from Loughgall, County Armagh in Ireland. He sat in the First Parliament of the United Kingdom.

== Life ==
Educated at Trinity Hall, Cambridge, Cope was elected in Armagh with Archibald Acheson at the 1801 general election.

He died in 1818 and is buried at St Mary's Church, Weymouth.

== Personal life ==
He was the grandson of former MP Robert Cope. He was the nephew of Anthony Cope, the former Dean of Armagh.

== See also ==
- Cope family
