= Robert Cope (died 1753) =

Irish Member of Parliament

Robert Cope (1679 – 17 March 1753) was an Irish Member of Parliament.

== Biography ==
He was the son of Anthony Cope, Dean of Elphin, by his wife Elizabeth, daughter of Henry Cope of Loughgall. He was educated at Trinity College Dublin.

He sat in the Irish House of Commons for Lisburn from 1711 to 1713 and for County Armagh from 1713 to 1714, and from 1727 until his death. In 1736, he was High Sheriff of Armagh.

Cope was married twice: firstly, in 1707, to Lettice, daughter of Arthur Brownlow, and secondly in 1711 to Elizabeth, daughter of Sir William Fownes. By his second wife he had several children, including Anthony, Dean of Armagh, and Arthur, whose son Robert Camden Cope was also MP for Armagh.

== See also ==
- Cope family
