= William Richardson (1656–1727) =

Irish politician

William Richardson (1656–1727) was an Irish politician.

He was the son of Major Edward Richardson of Legacorry (aka Richhill Castle), County Armagh, MP for County Armagh and his wife Anne Sacheverell, daughter of Francis Sacheverell and Dorothy Blennerhassett. He was educated at Trinity College Dublin.

He was appointed High Sheriff of Armagh for 1690 and elected the MP for County Armagh in 1692 and 1715 and for Hillsborough in 1703.

He married Elizabeth, the daughter of the Rt. Hon. Sir Richard Reynell, 1st Baronet, Lord Chief Justice of the King's Bench for Ireland and his wife Hester Beckett, in 1695. He had no children and was succeeded by his brother John.
