= Caulfield (surname) =

Caulfield is a surname of several separate origins. It may occasionally be of English origin, but in Ireland is often a simplified form of a number of Gaelic surnames, including Mac Cathmhaoil, an Ulster family traditionally descended from Niall of the Nine Hostages. It is also known to be an anglicized form of Ó Gamhna, Ó Gamhnáin and “Mac Congamhna”. A variant Caulfeild, were an Anglo-Irish family (see Earl of Charlemont). Notable people with this surname include:

- Aodh Mac Cathmhaoil, Irish Franciscan theologian and Archbishop of Armagh
- Barbara A. Caulfield, United States District Judge of the United States District Court for the Northern District of California
- Billy Caulfield, English footballer
- Bernard G. Caulfield, U.S. Representative from Illinois
- Bernard Caulfield, British barrister and High Court judge
- Bernadette Caulfield, American television producer
- Brian Caulfield, Irish venture capitalist
- Cole Caufield, Canadian and American ice hockey player
- Elizabeth Jane Caulfeild, Countess of Charlemont, wife of the 3rd Earl of Charlemont
- Emma Caulfield, actress in Buffy the Vampire Slayer
- Francis William Caulfeild, 2nd Earl of Charlemont (1775–1863)
- Frank J. Caufield, founder of venture capital firm Kleiner Perkins Caufield & Byers
- Henry S. Caulfield, former Governor of Missouri
- Holden Caulfield, main character of the novel The Catcher in the Rye
- Jake Caulfield, Professional Baseball Player
- James Caulfeild, 1st Earl of Charlemont (1728–1799)
- James Caulfeild, 3rd Earl of Charlemont (1820–1892)
- Jay Caufield, former NHL right winger
- Jo Caulfield, British comedian
- Joan Caulfield, American post-World War II actress
- John Caulfeild (1661–1707), son of William Caulfeild
- John Caulfield, Irish footballer
- Jack Caulfield, member of the Richard Nixon administration, assistant director of criminal enforcement at the U.S. Bureau of Alcohol, Tobacco, Firearms and Explosives
- Joseph Caulfield James, tutor to Prince Vajiravudh of Thailand
- Judd Caulfield (born 2001), American ice hockey player
- Louisa Caulfield, known as Mrs Caulfield, English music hall singer
- Maxine Caulfield, main character of the video game Life Is Strange
- Maria Caulfield, member of parliament, UK
- Martin Caulfield, Gaelic footballer
- Maxwell Caulfield, actor
- Patrick Caulfield, British artist
- Patrick Caulfield, discoverer of Céide Fields
- Sidney Caulfield (1877–1964), English architect
- Thomas J. Caulfield, American architect
- Thomas Caulfeild (lieutenant governor) or Caulfield, British Lieutenant-Governor of Nova Scotia
- Thomas Caulfield (actor) (1766–1815), a British stage actor
- Timothy Caulfield, Professor in the Faculty of Law and the School of Public Health, University of Alberta
- William Caulfeild, 1st Viscount Charlemont (1624–1671)
- William Caulfeild, 2nd Viscount Charlemont (c. 1655–1726)

== See also ==
- Caulfield (disambiguation)
