= Caulfeild =

Caulfeild is a surname. Notable people with the surname include:

- Elizabeth Jane Caulfeild (1834–1882), wife of James Caulfeild, 3rd Earl of Charlemont
- Francis Caulfeild, 2nd Earl of Charlemont (1775–1863), Irish peer and politician
- James Caulfeild, 1st Earl of Charlemont (1728–1799), Irish statesman
- James Caulfeild, 3rd Earl of Charlemont (1820–1892), Irish politician and peer
- James Caulfeild, 8th Viscount Charlemont (1880–1949), Irish peer, elected to the British House of Lords
- James Caulfeild (soldier) (1782–1852), British soldier and politician
- John Caulfeild (1661–1707), Irish soldier and politician
- John Caulfeild (priest) (1738–1816), Anglican priest in Ireland, Archdeacon of Kilmore, father of the soldier James Caulfeild
- Sophia Frances Anne Caulfeild (1824–1911), writer on religion and needlework
- Toby Caulfeild, 1st Baron Caulfeild (1565–1627), soldier and politician
- Toby Caulfeild, 3rd Baron Caulfeild (1621–1642), Anglo-Irish politician
- William Caulfeild (disambiguation), various people

== See also ==
- Caulfield (disambiguation)
- Caulfeild, a neighbourhood in West Vancouver, Canada
