= Viscount Charlemont =

Title in the Peerage of Ireland

- Quarterly: 1st and 4th, Barry Argent and Gules on a Canton of the second a Lion passant guardant Or (Caulfeild); 2nd and 3rd, Or a Chevron chequy Argent and Azure between three Martlets Sable (Houston)
- Creation date: 8 October 1665
- Created by: Charles II
- Peerage: Peerage of Ireland
- First holder: William Caulfeild, 5th Baron Caulfeild
- Present holder: John Dodd Caulfeild, 15th Viscount Charlemont
- Heir apparent: The Hon. Shane Andrew Caulfeild
- Subsidiary titles: Lord Caulfeild
- Status: Extant
- Former seat: Roxborough Castle
- Motto: DEO DUCE FERRO COMITANTE

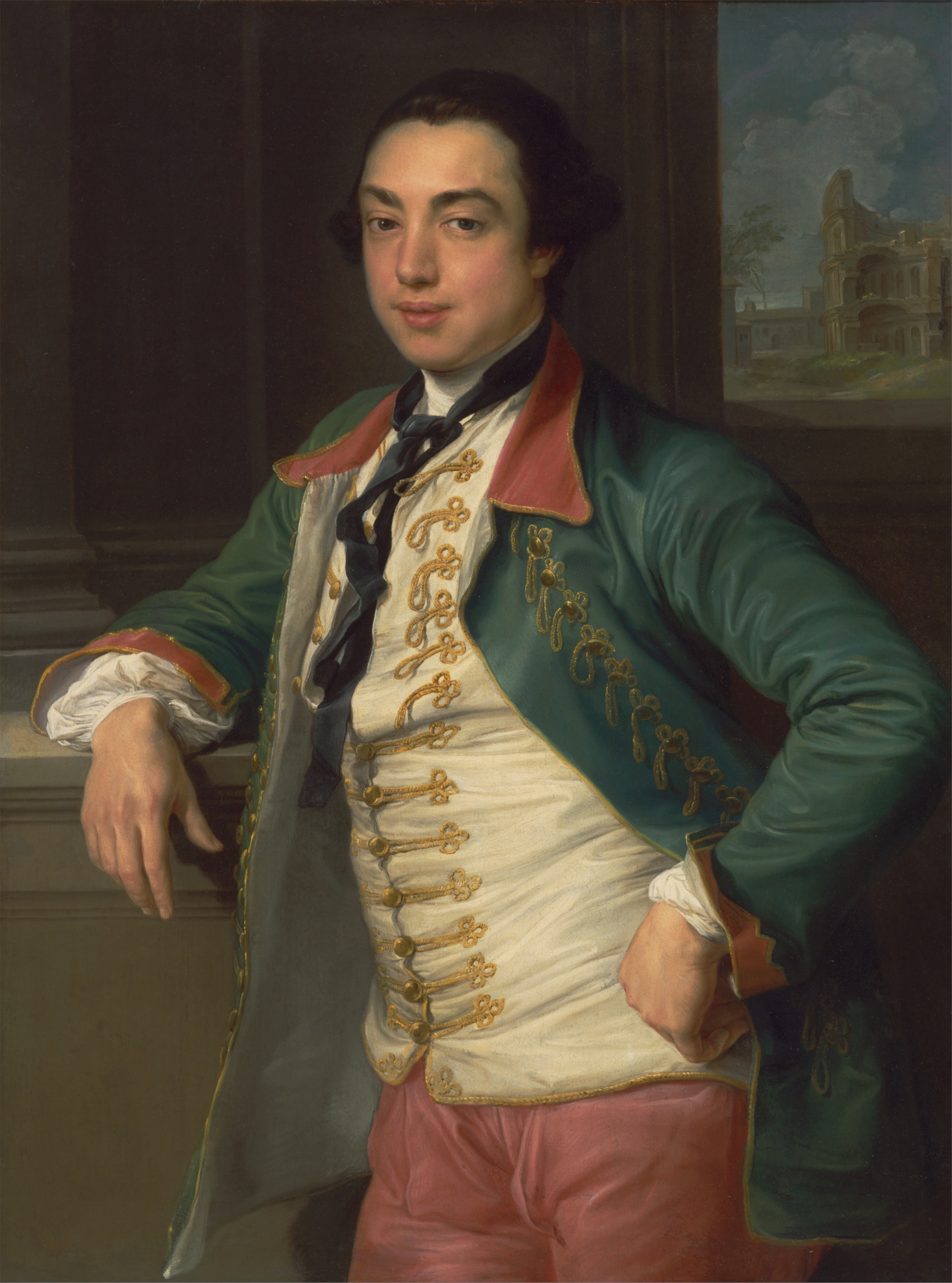
James Caulfeild, 1st Earl of Charlemont, as painted by Pompeo Batoni, c. 1753–1756.

Viscount Charlemont is a title in the Peerage of Ireland. It was created in 1665 for William Caulfeild, 5th Baron Charlemont.

The Caulfeild family descends from Sir Toby Caulfeild, originally of Oxfordshire, England. He was a noted soldier and also represented Armagh in the Irish House of Commons. In 1620 he was created Lord Caulfeild, Baron of Charlemont, in the Peerage of Ireland, with remainder to his nephew Sir William Caulfeild, who succeeded him as second Baron. The latter's son, the third Baron, was shot in 1642 on the orders of Sir Phelim O'Neill, the leader of the Irish Rebellion of 1641. His younger brother, the fifth Baron, had O'Neill apprehended and executed for the murder of his elder brother. In 1665 he was created Viscount Charlemont in the Peerage of Ireland. His son, the second Viscount, was an opponent of King James II and attainted, but was later restored by King William III. His son, the third Viscount, represented Charlemont in the Irish Parliament. He was succeeded by his son, the fourth Viscount. In 1763 he was created Earl of Charlemont in the Peerage of Ireland. His eldest son, the second Earl, sat in the House of Lords as an Irish representative peer from 1806 to 1863. In 1837 he was created Baron Charlemont, of Charlemont in the County of Armagh, in the Peerage of the United Kingdom, with remainder to his younger brother the Hon. Henry Caulfield and the heirs male of his body. Lord Charlemont later served as Lord Lieutenant of County Tyrone from 1839 to 1863. He was succeeded by his nephew (in the barony of 1837 according to the special remainder), the third Earl. He sat as a Liberal Member of Parliament for Armagh from 1847 to 1867 and also served as Lord Lieutenant of County Armagh from 1849 to 1864 and of County Tyrone between 1864 and 1892.

On his death the earldom and barony of 1837 became extinct, while he was succeeded in the other titles by his kinsman, the seventh Viscount. He was the great-great-grandson of Reverend the Hon. Charles Caulfeild, fifth son of the second Viscount. His nephew, the eighth Viscount, was a Member of the Senate of Northern Ireland from 1925 to 1937 and served as Minister of Education and Leader of the Senate from 1926 to 1937. He also sat in the House of Lords as an Irish representative peer from 1918 to 1949. On his death, this line of the family also failed. He was succeeded by his kinsman, the ninth Viscount. He was the grandson of James Caulfield, second son of the Reverend Hans Caulfeild, grandson of the Hon. Charles Caulfeild, fifth son of the second Viscount. On the death of his younger brother, the twelfth Viscount, in 1979, this line also failed, and the titles passed to his kinsman, the thirteenth Viscount. He was the eldest son of the Reverend Wilberforce Caulfeild, fourth son of the aforesaid Reverend Hans Caulfeild. He was succeeded by his nephew, the fourteenth Viscount. As of 2014 the titles are held by the latter's son, the fifteenth Viscount, who succeeded in 2001. He lives in Canada.

Other members of the family include Thomas, son of the second Baron, who was MP for Charlemont. He was the father of William, MP for Tulsk and father of Thomas, Toby, and St George, all of whom were also MPs for Tulsk: St George was also a highly successful lawyer who ended his career as Lord Chief Justice of Ireland. John, son of the first Viscount, was MP for Charlemont, and Francis, son of the third Viscount, was MP for Armagh and Charlemont.

The family seats were Roxborough Castle, near Moy, County Tyrone, and Charlemont Fort, near Charlemont, County Armagh.

== Baron Caulfeild (1620) ==
- Toby Caulfeild, 1st Baron Caulfeild (1565–1627)
- William Caulfeild, 2nd Baron Caulfeild (1587–1640)
- Toby Caulfeild, 3rd Baron Caulfeild (1621–1642)
- Robert Caulfeild, 4th Baron Caulfeild (1622–1642)
- William Caulfeild, 5th Baron Caulfeild (1624–1671) (created Viscount Charlemont in 1665)

=== Viscount Charlemont (1665) ===
- William Caulfeild, 1st Viscount Charlemont (1624–1671)
- William Caulfeild, 2nd Viscount Charlemont (c. 1655 – 1726)
- James Caulfeild, 3rd Viscount Charlemont (1682–1734)
- James Caulfeild, 4th Viscount Charlemont (1728–1799) (created Earl of Charlemont in 1763)

=== Earl of Charlemont (1763) ===
- James Caulfeild, 1st Earl of Charlemont (1728–1799)
- Francis William Caulfeild, 2nd Earl of Charlemont (1775–1863)
- James Molyneux Caulfeild, 3rd Earl of Charlemont (1820–1892)

=== Viscount Charlemont (1665; reverted) ===
- James Caulfeild, 7th Viscount Charlemont (1830–1913)
- James Caulfeild, 8th Viscount Charlemont (1880–1949)
- Charles Caulfeild, 9th Viscount Charlemont (1887–1962)
- Robert Caulfeild, 10th Viscount Charlemont (1881–1967)
- Charles Caulfeild, 11th Viscount Charlemont (1884–1971)
- Richard Caulfeild, 12th Viscount Charlemont (1887–1979)
- Charles Caulfeild, 13th Viscount Charlemont (1899–1985)
- John Caulfeild, 14th Viscount Charlemont (1934–2001)
- John Dodd Caulfeild, 15th Viscount Charlemont (born 1966)

The heir apparent is the present holder's son, the Hon. Shane Andrew Caulfeild (born 1996).

== See also ==
- Castlecaulfield
- Castle Caulfield
