= William Caulfeild =

William Caulfeild or Caulfield may refer to:

- William Caulfeild, 2nd Baron Caulfeild (1587–1640), Baron Caulfeild, Irish Master-General of the Ordnance
- William Caulfeild, 1st Viscount Charlemont (1624–1671), Irish peer, Custos Rotulorum of Armagh and Tyrone
- William Caulfeild (1665–1737), Irish lawyer
- William Caulfeild, 2nd Viscount Charlemont (died 1726), Irish soldier and MP for Charlemont
- William Caulfeild (British Army officer) (died 1767), British soldier responsible for the construction of roads
- Billy Caulfield (1892–1972), English footballer
