= John Caulfeild (1690–1764) =

Anglo-Irish politician (c.1690–1764)

John Caulfeild (c.1690 – 19 October 1764) was an Anglo-Irish politician.

Caulfeild was the Member of Parliament for Charlemont in the Irish House of Commons between 1723 and 1760.

Parliament of Ireland
Preceded by Hon. James Caulfeild; Humphrey May	Member of Parliament for Charlemont; 1723–1760; With: Hon. James Caulfeild (1723–1727); John Moore (1727–1752); Thomas Adderley (1752–1760)	Succeeded by Francis Caulfeild; Henry William Moore
