= Caulfield =

Caulfield may refer to:

== Places ==
- Caulfield, Victoria, suburb in Melbourne, Australia
- Electoral district of Caulfield, a state electoral district in Victoria, Australia
- Caulfield, Missouri, a community in Missouri
- Castlecaulfield, a village in County Tyrone, Northern Ireland
- Castle Caulfield, a ruined house in Castlecaulfield

== People ==
- Caulfield (surname), people with the surname Caulfield

=== Fictional characters ===
- Holden Caulfield, fictional character in The Catcher in the Rye
- Caulfield, eight-year-old character in the comic strip Frazz
- Max Caulfield, the protagonist of the 2015 video game Life Is Strange

== Facilities and structures ==
- Caulfield Racecourse, horse-racing venue
- Caulfield Grammar School, independent school in Victoria, Australia
- Caulfield railway station, Melbourne

== Other ==
- Caulfield Cup, horse race
- The Caulfields, 1990s rock group from the Philadelphia area

== See also ==
- Caulfeild (disambiguation)
- Caufield, a surname
