= James Caulfeild, 3rd Viscount Charlemont =

Anglo-Irish politician and peer

The Right Honourable The Viscount Charlemont

Member of Parliament for Charlemont
- In office 1713–1726 Serving with Andrew Lloyd, Humphrey May, John Caulfeild
- Preceded by: George Dodington; John Davys
- Succeeded by: John Moore; John Caulfeild
- In office 1703–1705 Serving with John Caulfeild
- Preceded by: Stephen Ludlow; Edward Riley
- Succeeded by: John Caulfeild; John Davys

Personal details
- Born: James Caulfeild; 29 July 1682
- Died: 21 April 1734 (aged 51)
- Spouse: Elizabeth Bernard
- Relations: Thomas Caulfeild (brother)
- Children: James Caulfeild, 1st Earl of Charlemont; Francis Caulfeild; Alicia Browne, Baroness Kilmaine
- Parent(s): William Caulfeild, 2nd Viscount Charlemont; Anne Margetson
- Education: Trinity College Dublin

James Caulfeild, 3rd Viscount Charlemont (29 July 1682 – 21 April 1734) was an Anglo-Irish politician and peer.

== Early life ==
Caulfeild was the eldest son, of five sons and seven daughters, born to the former Anne Margetson and William Caulfeild, 2nd Viscount Charlemont. Among his siblings was Thomas Caulfeild, the Lieutenant-Governor of Nova Scotia.

His paternal grandparents were William Caulfeild, 1st Viscount Charlemont and Hon. Sarah Moore (a daughter of the 2nd Viscount Moore). His mother was the only daughter of Anne (née Bennett) Margetson and James Margetson, Archbishop of Armagh.

He was educated at Trinity College Dublin, graduating with a bachelor of arts in 1702 and with a master of arts in 1704.

== Career ==
He was the Member of Parliament for Charlemont in the Irish House of Commons from 1703 to 1705, before representing the seat again from 1713 to 1726. On 21 July 1726 he inherited his father's viscountcy and assumed his seat in the Irish House of Lords.

== Personal life ==
Caulfeild married Elizabeth Bernard, daughter of Alice (née Ludlow) Bernard (a daughter of Stephen Ludlow, Clerk of the Court of Chancery) and Francis Bernard, MP and judge of the Court of Common Pleas. Together they were the parents of three surviving children, including:

- James Caulfeild, 1st Earl of Charlemont (1728–1799), who married Mary Hickman, daughter of Thomas Hickman of Brickhill, in 1768.
- Hon. Francis Caulfeild (c. 1730–1775), MP for County Armagh and Charlemont, who married Hon. Mary Eyre, only daughter of John Eyre, 1st Baron Eyre, in 1760.
- Hon. Alicia Caulfeild (d. 1797), who married John Browne, 1st Baron Kilmaine, in 1764.

Lord Charlemont died on 21 April 1734 and was buried in Armagh Cathedral. He was succeeded in his titles by his eldest son, James, who was made Earl of Charlemont in 1763. The viscountcy of Charlemont was held by the earls of Charlemont until 1892, when on the death of the 3rd Earl of Charlemont, the viscountcy passed to a descendant of the 3rd Viscount's younger brother, Charles Caulfeild, Rector of Donaghenry. After his death, his widow Thomas Adderley, but died in childbirth in 1743 at the age of 40.

=== Descendants ===
Through his second son Francis, he was a grandfather of Eleanor Caulfeild, who married William Howard, 3rd Earl of Wicklow, MP for St Johnstown, in 1787.

Parliament of Ireland
| Preceded by Stephen Ludlow; Edward Riley | Member of Parliament for Charlemont; 1703–1705; With: John Caulfeild | Succeeded by John Caulfeild; John Davys |
| Preceded by George Dodington; John Davys | Member of Parliament for Charlemont; 1713–1726; With: Andrew Lloyd (1713–1715); Humphrey May (1715–1723); John Caulfeild (1723–1726) | Succeeded by John Moore; John Caulfeild |
Peerage of Ireland
| Preceded by William Caulfeild | Viscount Charlemont; 1726–1734 | Succeeded by James Caulfeild |
