= James Caulfeild =

James Caulfeild may refer to:

- James Caulfeild, 3rd Viscount Charlemont (1682–1734), Anglo-Irish politician and peer
- James Caulfeild, 1st Earl of Charlemont (1728–1799), Irish statesman
- James Caulfeild, 3rd Earl of Charlemont (1820–1892), Irish politician and peer
- James Caulfeild, 8th Viscount Charlemont (1880–1949), Irish peer, Northern Ireland politician
- James Caulfeild (soldier) (1782–1852), soldier and MP for Abingdon
