= Sir Annesley Stewart, 6th Baronet =

Anglo-Irish banker and politician

Sir Annesley Stewart, 6th Baronet (1725 – March 1801) was an Anglo-Irish banker and politician.

Stewart was the son of Ezekiel Stewart and Anne Ward. He was the Member of Parliament for Charlemont in the Irish House of Commons between 1763 and 1797. He was a banker in Dublin.

He married Mary Moore, daughter of John Moore, in September 1755. On 14 August 1769 Stewart succeeded the baronetcy of his distant cousin, William Stewart, 1st Earl of Blessington. He was succeeded by his eldest son, James Stewart.

Parliament of Ireland
| Preceded by Francis Caulfeild; Henry William Moore | Member of Parliament for Charlemont; 1767–1797; With: Francis Caulfeild (1767–1775); Henry Grattan (1775–1790); Richard Sheridan (1790–1794); Sir Richard Jephson, Bt (1794–1797) | Succeeded by Sir Richard Jephson, Bt; William Plunket |
Baronetage of Ireland
| Preceded by William Stewart | Baronet (of Ramelton); 1769–1801 | Succeeded by James Stewart |
