= Caufield =

Caufield is an Irish surname, a variation to the name Caulfield. Notable people with the surname include:

- Cole Caufield (born 2001), American ice hockey player
- Frank J. Caufield (1939–2019), American businessman
- James Caufield, American photographer
- Jay Caufield (born 1960), American ice hockey player
- LaNeishea Caufield (born 1980), American basketball player

== See also ==
- Caulfield (disambiguation)
