= Sir Francis Dashwood, 1st Baronet =

British politician

The Right Honourable Sir Francis Dashwood Bt

Member of Parliament for Winchelsea
- In office 1708–1713 Serving with George Dodington, Robert Bristow
- Preceded by: James Hayes; George Dodington
- Succeeded by: Robert Bristow; George Dodington

Personal details
- Born: c. 1658
- Died: 4 November 1724 (aged 65–66)
- Spouses: Mary Jennings (m. 1683; died 1694) Lady Mary Fane (m. 1705; died 1710) Mary King (m. 1712; died 1717) Lady Elizabeth Windsor (m. 1720)
- Relations: Samuel Dashwood (brother); Sir Robert Dashwood, 1st Baronet (cousin); Sir John Dashwood-King, 4th Baronet (grandson)
- Children: Francis Dashwood, 11th Baron le Despencer; Sir John Dashwood-King, 3rd Baronet

Sir Francis Dashwood, 1st Baronet (c. 1658 – 4 November 1724) was a British merchant, landowner, and Whig politician who sat in the House of Commons from 1708 to 1713.

== Early life ==
Francis Dashwood was the third son of Francis Dashwood and his wife Alice Sleigh, daughter of Richard Sleigh of Derbyshire. He was a brother of Sir Samuel Dashwood, Lord Mayor of London, and a cousin of Sir Robert Dashwood, 1st Baronet. His sister Sarah married Fulke Greville, 5th Baron Brooke in 1665. His father was a merchant trading with the country of Turkey, and an Alderman of London.

== Career ==
Dashwood and his brother Samuel joined their father's business early and became leading silk importers. He became a Freeman of the Vintners' Company in 1680. He was able to loan the government £1,000 in March 1690 and to establish a residence at Wanstead Essex. He was an assistant of the Royal African Company for the years 1693 to 1695, 1697 to 1700, 1704, 1706 to 1707 and 1709 to 1712. He was a director of the Old East India Company from 1700 to 1702, 1703 to 1705, and 1707 to 1709, and was a manager of the United Trade Company from 1707 to 1708.

In 1698, the Dashwood brothers were able to invest £15,000 to buy the estate of West Wycombe from their brother-in-law Thomas Lewis. Francis Dashwood eventually bought his brothers' share. Samuel Dashwood was Lord Mayor of London in 1702 and at his inauguration Francis was knighted by Queen Anne. He was created baronet of West Wycombe on 28 June 1707.

In 1712, he was upper warden of the Vintner's Company.

=== Political career ===
Dashwood was returned unopposed as member of parliament for Winchelsea at the 1708 British general election. There was uncertainty about Dashwood's political inclinations, but he acted as a Whig in voting for the naturalization of the Palatines in February 1709, and in supporting the impeachment of Dr Sacheverell in 1710. He also signed an address of the London lieutenancy that censured outrages that were committed by high-church mobs. He was returned for Winchelsea again at the 1710 British general election and voted against the French commerce bill on 18 June 1713. He did not stand at the 1713 British general election.

In about 1720, Dashwood bought the Buckinghamshire manor of Halton, and spent lavishly to beautify its house and to embellish his home at West Wycombe.

== Personal life ==
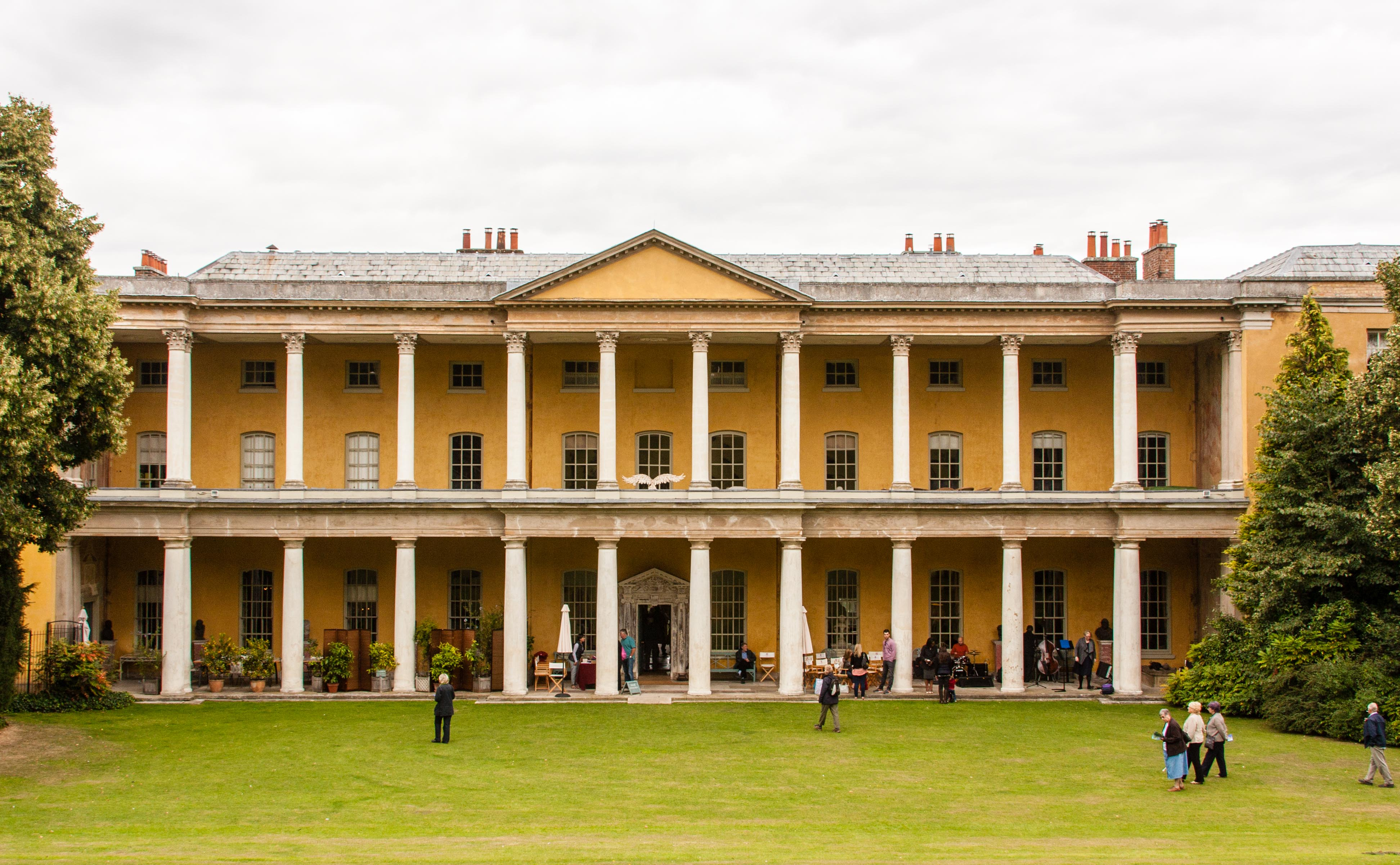
West Wycombe Park

By licence dated 13 April 1683, Dashwood married Mary Jennings, a daughter of John Jennings of St Margaret's, Westminster, which increased his finances. Before her death in 1694, they were the parents of a son, who predeceased him, and two daughters, including:

- Mary Dashwood, who married Sir Fulwar Skipwith, 2nd Baronet in 1703.
- Susanna Dashwood (c. 1685–1747), who married Sir Orlando Bridgeman, 2nd Baronet.

On 30 May 1705, he married as his second wife Lady Mary Fane (1676–1710), daughter of Vere Fane, 4th Earl of Westmorland and the former Rachel Bence (a daughter of John Bence). Before his second wife died in 1710, they were the parents of a son and daughter:

- Rachel Dashwood (c. 1706–1788), who married Sir Robert Austen, 4th Baronet in 1738.
- Francis Dashwood, 11th Baron le Despencer (1708–1781), who married Lady Sarah Ellys, daughter of George Gould of Iver, and widow of Sir Richard Ellis, 3rd Baronet.

After the death of Mary in 1710, he married as his third wife Mary King, sister of Dr. John King, on 17 June 1712. Before her death in 1717, they had two sons and two daughters, one of whom predeceased him, including:

- Henrietta Dashwood, who died unmarried.
- Mary Dashwood, who married John Walcott in 1732.
- Sir John Dashwood-King, 3rd Baronet, who succeeded his half-brother to become the 3rd baronet; he married Sarah Moore and had eight children.
- Charles Dashwood (b. 1717), who died unmarried.

He married on 21 July 1720, his fourth and final wife Lady Elizabeth Windsor (d. 1736), daughter of Thomas Hickman-Windsor, 1st Earl of Plymouth and, his second wife, Ursula Widdrington (a daughter of Sir Thomas Widdrington). He had no children by his fourth wife.

He died at his town-house in Hanover Square on 4 November 1724 and was buried at Wycombe. His personal estate was valued at over £34,000. As his eldest surviving son died without legitimate male issue in 1781, his younger son John, inherited the baronetcy.

Parliament of Great Britain
Preceded by James Hayes; George Dodington	Member of Parliament for Winchelsea; 1708–1713; With: George Dodington 1708; Robert Bristow 1708–1713	Succeeded by Robert Bristow; George Dodington
Baronetage of Great Britain
New creation	Baronet (of West Wycombe); 1707–1724	Succeeded by Francis Dashwood
