= Giles Eyre (priest) =

Anglican priest in Ireland

Giles Eyre (1689–1749) was an Anglican priest in Ireland in the eighteenth century.

His father John Eyre of Eyrecourt Castle (died 1741) was a grandson of John Eyre, the Cromwellian settler in Galway. He was educated at Trinity College, Dublin. He was Archdeacon of Ross from 1716 to 1749; Chancellor of Cork from 1717 to 1730; Dean of Killaloe from 1728 until his death; Prebendary of Clonfert from 1730 to 1750; and Treasurer of Kilmacduagh from 1737 until his death.

His son John Eyre, 1st Baron Eyre, was an Irish politician.
