= James Hayes (died c. 1731) =

English politician

James Hayes (before 2 April 1676 – 1730/1731) was an English politician. He was a Member of Parliament (MP) for Winchelsea from 1702 to 1708.

== Family ==
Hayes was baptised on 2 April 1676. He was the eldest son of Sir James Hayes and his wife Rachel née Hungerford, daughter of Anthony Hungerford. Rachel was the widow of Henry Carey, 4th Viscount Falkland. This Anthony Carey, 5th Viscount Falkland was Hayes' half-brother. Around April 1709, Hayes married Elizabrth Ashburnham, daughter of John Ashburnham, 1st Baron Ashburnham.

== Career ==
Hayes was educated at Lincoln's Inn.

== Death ==
He died aged approximately 55. He died between the end of March 1730, when he made his will, and the beginning of December 1731.

Parliament of England
Preceded by George Clarke; Robert Austen	Member of Parliament for Winchelsea; 1702–1708; With: George Clarke 1702–1705; George Dodington 1705–1708	Succeeded by George Dodington; Sir Francis Dashwood, Bt
