= Robert Dougatt =

Robert Dougatt (1683–1730) was an Anglican priest and librarian in Ireland in the first half of the 18th-century.

Dougatt was the nephew (sister's son) of William King, Archbishop of Dublin. He was born in Castlecaulfield and educated at Trinity College, Dublin. He was Archdeacon of Dublin from 1715 to 1719; and Precentor of St Patrick's Cathedral, Dublin from 1719 until his death. He was also the librarian of Marsh's Library, Dublin, from 1719 to 1730, and compiled the first catalogue of the library.
