= Castlecaulfield =

Coordinates: 54°30′28″N 6°50′10″W

Castlecaulfield: Irish: Baile Uí Dhonnaíle; Scots: Caufle
- Village
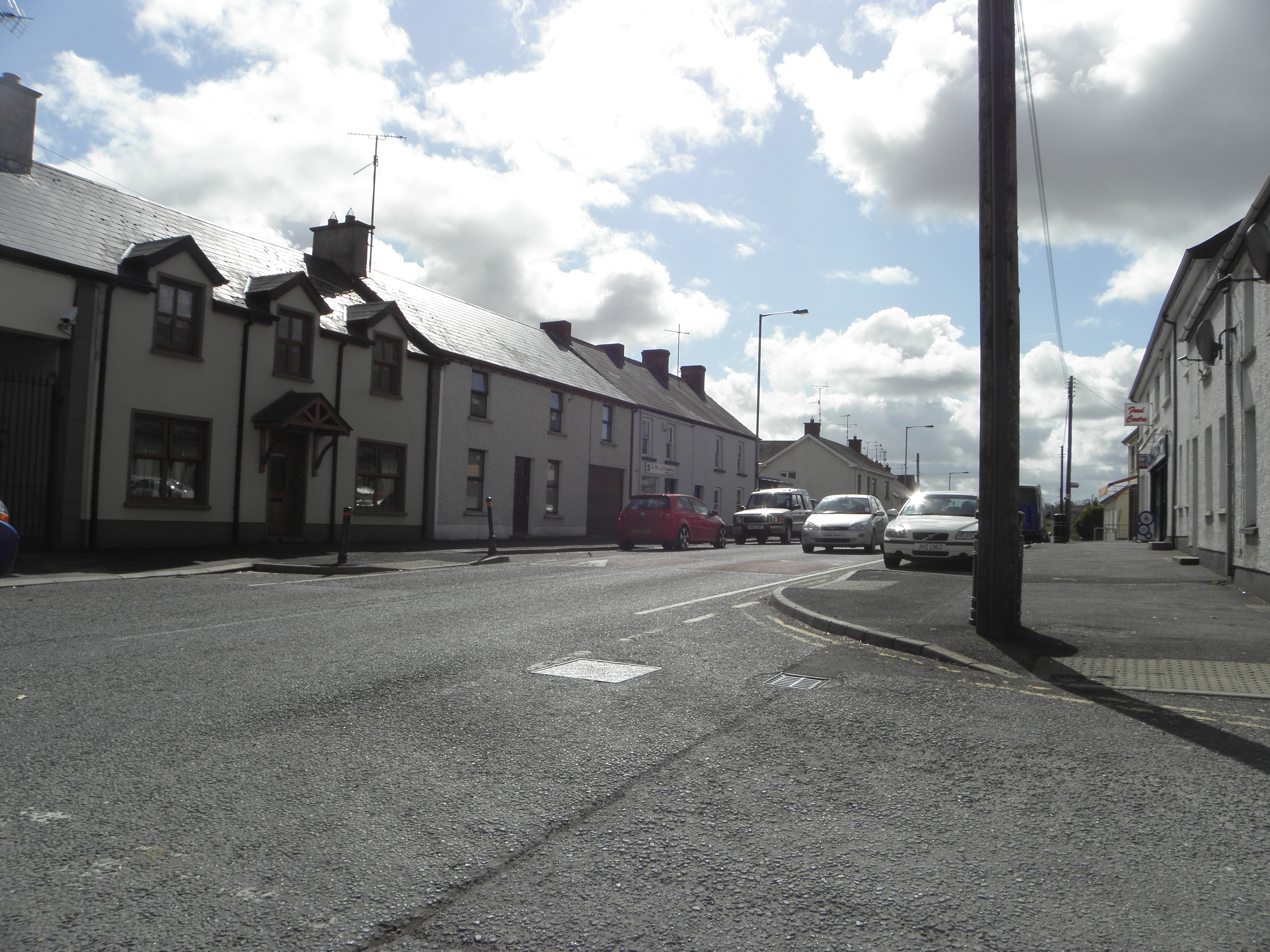
- Main Street, taken on 7 April 2010

- Location within Northern Ireland
- Population: 659 (2011 Census)
- Irish grid reference: H 75422 62736
- District: Mid Ulster
- County: County Tyrone
- Country: Northern Ireland
- Sovereign state: United Kingdom
- Post town: DUNGANNON
- Postcode district: BT70
- Dialling code: 028

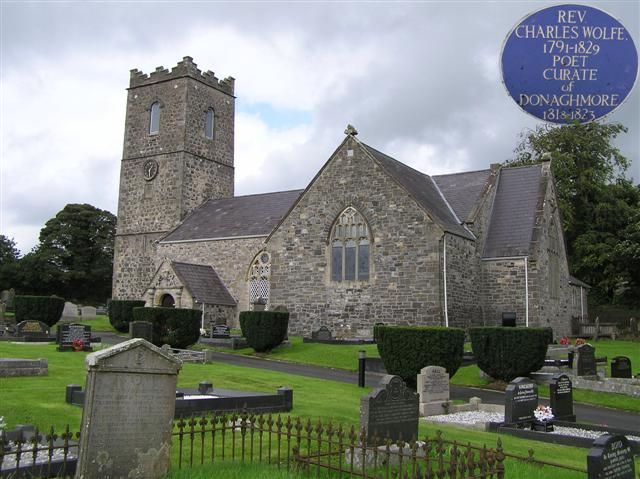
St Michael's Church of Ireland Church

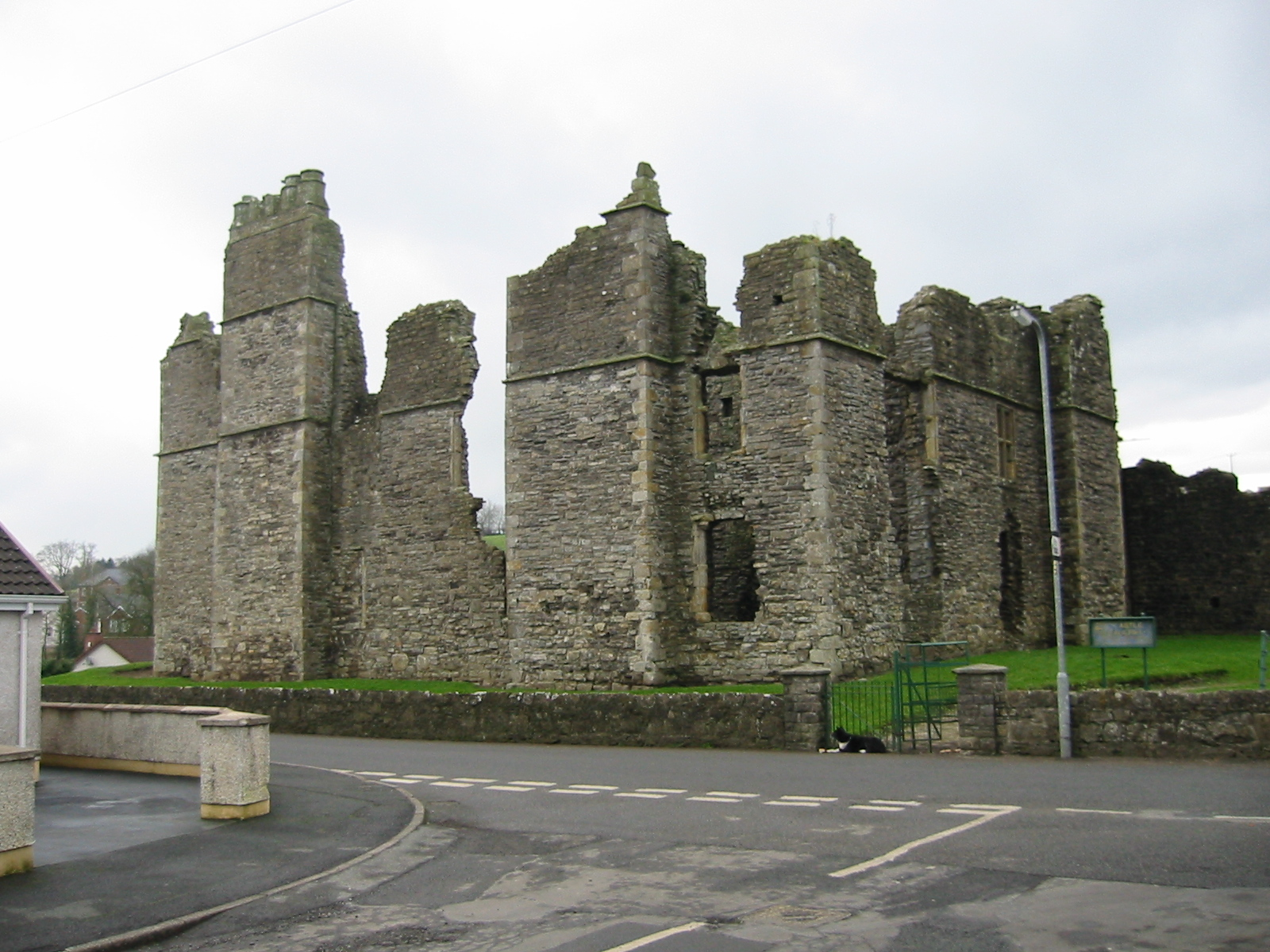
Castle Caulfield, a now ruined fortified house in the village

Castlecaulfield (Irish: Baile Uí Dhonnaíle, meaning 'town or territory of O'Donnelly') is a village in the south-east of County Tyrone in Northern Ireland. It lies about 2 miles west of Dungannon and is part of the Mid Ulster District Council area. The village is mostly within the townland of Drumreany, although part of it extends into Lisnamonaghan. It is situated in the historic Barony of Dungannon Middle and the civil parish of Donaghmore.

The Caulfeild family, from which the village derives its name (although spelt differently for the last few hundred years), were also responsible for founding the settlement of Caulfeild, West Vancouver, Canada in 1898/99.

Through the work of the 'Castlecaulfield Horticultural Society' the village was 'Village Category' winner of 'Ulster In Bloom' in 2015, 2016 and 2017. It was also 'Village Category' winner of 'Britain in Bloom' in 2016 and 2018. In 2017 the village was a category winner of 'Communities in Bloom' receiving the award in Canada. The same year 'Castlecaulfield Horticultural Society' received the Queens Award for Voluntary Service. Castlecaulfield was awarded 'Best Kept Small Village' in 2016 and 2017.

== History ==
The townland the village is in was formerly known as Ballydonnelly (Irish: Baile Uí Dhonnaíle), and was the stronghold of the O'Donnelly (Uí Donnghaile) sept, who had held the role of marshalls to the O'Neills of Tyrone. According to Gaelic Irish tradition, the O'Donnellys were part of the Cenél nEoghain making them kin of the O'Neills. In their role as Marshalls to the O'Neills they were responsible for fostering the children of 'The O'Neill'. The O'Donnellys reached the height of their role during the time of Shane O'Neill when Dean Terrence Danyell (Turlough O'Donnelly) of Armagh played a key role in communications between Shane O'Neill and Elizabeth I. The earliest mention of Ballydonnelly is the Annals of the Four Masters in 1531 when it is said Baile-Ui-Donnghaile was assaulted by Niall Oge, son of Art, son of Con O'Neill. He demolished the castle; and he made a prisoner of the son of O'Neill, who was foster-son of O'Donnelly, and carried him off, together with the horses and the other spoils of the town.” At the start of the Plantation of Ulster, Ballydonnelly was allocated as a 'Servitor' portion and as such was granted to Sir Toby Caulfeild who had served in the Crown forces during the 'Nine Years War'. The 'castle' to which the placename refers is atypical of most Plantation structures, in that it is not the more usual fortified tower house, and was built for Sir Toby Caulfeild in the style of an Oxfordshire manor house. This manor house, called Castle Caulfield, was badly damaged by fire during the 1641 rebellion and was only reused in a limited capacity thereafter by the descendants of the Caulfeild family.

Throughout the 18th and 19th centuries, the village was a centre for the developing linen industry, and many mills and farms located in and around the village were involved in linen production. This culminated in the building of the Acheson & Smith Works (later David Acheson Ltd) in 1874. The factory was in operation until 1978/79 before closure. It was a major employer within the district.

== Places of interest ==
- Castle Caulfield, built by Sir Toby Caulfield between 1611 and 1619 is in the village. The gatehouse has murder-holes and the Caulfeild Arms.
- St Michael's And All Angel's Church of Ireland built c. 1681
- Parkanaur House, a Tudor revival country house, founded c. 1804 by the 'Burges' family who occupied the property until their departure in 1955. It is now known as Parkanaur College and the surrounding estate is a Forest park under the care of the NI Forest Service.
- Castlecaulfield Presbyterian Church

== Sport ==
Castlecaulfield F.C. are the village's football team and play in the Mid-Ulster Football League. They have won the Foster Cup back-to-back and Division 2.

== Events ==
- Castlecaulfield Horticultural Society hold a show every year in August to which people are encouraged to enter horticultural and handicraft items for prizes. The society also holds fundraising events throughout the year to support its yearly show.

== Notable people ==
- Sir Toby Caulfeild (1565–1627) was responsible for the Plantation settlement of Castlecaulfield, or the 'Manor of Aghloske' as it was called in 1610. He also had Castle Caulfield constructed.
- Saint Oliver Plunkett, Archbishop of Armagh, carried out ordinations in the grounds of Castle Caulfield c. 1670 under the invitation and protection of The 1st Viscount Charlemont.
- Rev George Walker Jnr was Rector of Donaghmore Parish (1674–1690) with 'St Michael and All Saints Church' being the Parish Church. He was the Governor of Derry in 1689 and was killed at the Battle of the Boyne in 1690. His remains are buried within St Michael's.
- John Wesley visited Castlecaulfield on a number of occasions between 1767 and 1789 leading to the founding of the local Methodist congregation in 1842.
- Poet Charles Wolfe (1791–1823), author of 'The Burial of Sir John Moore', was Curate of Donaghmore Parish (1818–1823). A Blue Plaque is erected in his memory near the entrance to St Michael's & All Saints Church
- American author Maureen Daly was born in Castlecaulfield on 15 March 1921. She was the author of Seventeenth Summer, which was believed to have sold over a million copies by 2005.
- John Givan (1837–1895). Liberal Member of Parliament (MP) for County Monaghan 1880–1883
- Joseph Johnston (1890–1972), academic, farmer, writer and Member of Seanad Éireann 1938-198 and 1951–1954
- Robert Dougatt (1683–1730), Anglican priest and librarian
- Trevor Ferguson (1964–2012),

Motorbike rider

== Demography ==
=== 19th century population ===
The population of the village increased slightly overall during the 19th century:

Year	1841	1851	1861	1871	1881	1891
Population	167	172	208	185	220	170
Houses	37	45	43	37	38	40
