= Battle of Portlester =

1643 battle

Coordinates: 53.5328°N 6.964751°W

- Part of Irish Confederate Wars
Date	7 August 1643
Location	Portlester, Meath, Ireland
Result	Confederate victory

Belligerents
Irish Royalists	Irish Confederates

Commanders and leaders
Charles Moore †	Owen O'Neill

Strength
c. 3,400	c. 1,500

Casualties and losses
c. 200 killed	Light

Ireland and Portlester

The Battle of Portlester took place on 7 August 1643 near the town of Ballivor, Leinster in Ireland as part of the Irish Confederate Wars. It was fought between Irish Confederates under Owen Roe O'Neill and a Protestant Royalist force from Dublin under Lord Moore. The battle consisted primarily of an exchange of artillery fire in which Moore was killed and his army driven off, giving the Confederates victory.

== Background ==
The Irish Rebellion of 1641 led to the formation of the Catholic Confederation and the 1641 to 1653 Irish Confederate Wars. Charles and his opponents in Parliament approved the recruitment of an army to suppress the rising, led by the Earl of Ormonde, a Protestant Royalist. However, the ongoing tensions between the two sides resulted in the outbreak of the First English Civil War in August 1642;Ormonde could no longer receive reinforcements or money from England, and by early 1643 the Confederacy held most of Ireland, with the exception of Ulster, Dublin and Cork City.

During the summer of 1643, O'Neill's Ulster Army had moved south into Leinster following their defeat at the Battle of Clones. Alongside local Confederate forces they captured a series of Protestant-garrisoned towns notably Ballybeg where they seized a large quantity of supplies and Protestant hostages. O'Neill force was reinforced with troops from County Longford under Richard O'Farrell. The plundering of the area by O'Neill's forces led to intense hostility from local Catholic inhabitants against the Ulster Army which was to become a recurring feature during the war.

Portlester was a small settlement in County Meath, east of Ballivor and southwest of Trim, which was held by royalist Protestant forces. O'Neill's troops besieged Portlester Castle, bringing up artillery to pound the defences. The defenders eventually decided to abandon their position by escaping to safety across the nearby river.

== Battle ==
O'Neill then received intelligence that a Protestant force under Lord Moore was approaching from Athboy. Moore had recently been reinforced and was eager to test the strength of O'Neill's army. Moore wished to prevent the Ulster Army from capturing more of the government's strongholds and stop further damage being done to the countryside.

O'Neill placed his troops in defensive positions near a ford over the river and around a nearby flour mill; he then led some of them forwards until they made contact with the enemy, then withdrew hastily in an effort to draw Moore's army onto unfavourable ground. As they advanced in pursuit, the Protestant troops were raked with crossfire particularly from the mill where O'Neill had stationed musketeers. Faced with heavy fire, Moore's men withdrew. They regrouped and assaulted O'Neill's forces two additional times, but were driven back.

Moore then sent a large force to attack the mill. Heavy hand-to-hand combat took place around the position, while Moore launched further attacks on the ford. O'Neill sent in a relief column to the mill whose defenders accepted fresh ammunition but rejected the need for reinforcements and pledged to hold the position at all costs. While Moore was surveying the nearby fighting at the mill, he was struck by an artillery shot that killed him. Following their commander's death the government forces broke and fled. Some of O'Neill's troops wanted to follow them, but O'Neill rejected this as he feared that the withdrawal was a ruse and wanted to conserve his forces.

== Aftermath ==
The following morning the Protestant army retreated towards Athboy. Although there were other government troops nearby under George Monck, they were short of numbers and marched towards Trim. O'Neill rewarded the mill's defenders with gold coins for their bravery. Although the victory brought an end the series of defeats that the Ulster Army had suffered over the previous two years, the defensive battle at Portlester gave little advantage to the Confederates as they lacked the resources to attempt a further advance eastwards towards Dublin.

Shortly afterwards a cessation of arms was agreed between the Dublin government of Ormond and the Irish Confederates as a first step towards negotiating a peace treaty and alliance against their mutual enemies the Roundhead forces in England.

The death of Moore was likely an inspiration for the part of Tyragnes in the 1645 play Cola's Furie by Henry Burkhead which portrayed contemporary events in Ireland.

== Sources ==
- BCW. "The Cessation of Arms". BCW Project.
- Casway, Jerrold I. Owen Roe O'Neill and the Struggle for Catholic Ireland. University of Pennsylvania Press, 1984.
- Randall, Dale. Winter Fruit: English Drama, 1642-1660. University Press of Kentucky. 1995.
