= George Dodington (died 1720) =

George Dodington (c. 1662 – 28 March 1720) of Eastbury Park, Dorset was a merchant, office holder and Whig politician who sat in the English and British House of Commons from 1705 to 1720, under the patronage of Edward Russell, 1st Earl of Orford.

== Early life and family ==
Dodington was the eldest son of John Dodington of Dodington, Somerset and his wife Hester Temple, daughter of Sir Peter Temple, 2nd Baronet of Stowe, Buckinghamshire. His grandfather Sir Francis Dodington had been granted in trust the profits of a commissionership of appeals in excise which fell to his son. When Dodington's father died in 1673, Sir Francis' second wife tried to claim these but Dodington's mother counter-claimed and as a result Dodington was appointed to a post on the commission.

== Business activities ==
Dodington prospered and by 1688 was part owner of four ships. In 1690 he and his partners secured lucrative contracts for supplying clothing to the army. Also, by 1687 he had started to undertake occasional work for the Treasurer of the Navy - and was finally in the service of Admiral Edward Russell. In 1695, Russell appointed him his paymaster and office manager, as a result of which Russell, who became Earl of Orford in 1697, became a powerful patron throughout his career. Dodington was a commissioner for Greenwich Hospital in 1695, commissioner for taking subscriptions to the land bank in 1696 and was appointed trustee for Exchequer bills in 1697. His increasing wealth allowed him to become a significant subscriber under both posts. He married by licence dated 12 February 1697 Eleanor Bull, daughter of Henry Bull MP.

== Political career ==
In the late 1690s, Dodington became a target of Lord Orford's enemies who smeared him with financial impropriety in his offices, as an indirect attack on his patron. Although he could argue in his own defence and was supported by the Whigs, he lost his offices as paymaster and trustee for exchequer bills, and spent five years sorting out Orford's accounts. At the 1705 general election, he was returned unopposed as Whig Member of Parliament for Winchelsea. Although his father on his death told him to sell the Winchelsea estate, he did not, and so maintained an electoral interest there. In 1706, he was appointed secretary to the English commissioners for the Union with Scotland and became a trustee for a loan to the Emperor. He was Chief Secretary for Ireland from 1707 to 1708 and represented Charlemont in the Irish House of Commons from 1707 to 1713. At the 1708 general election, he was returned again for Winchelsea and also for Bridgwater and chose to sit for Bridgwater. From 1708 to 1710 he was one of the Lords of the Admiralty. He was returned again at Bridgwater in 1710. In 1711 he became a commissioner for taking subscriptions to the South Sea Company. However he was threatened with strong opposition at Bridgwater at the 1713 general election and had himself returned for Winchelsea instead. He became an Irish Privy Councillor in 1714 and Clerk of the Pells for Ireland in 1715.

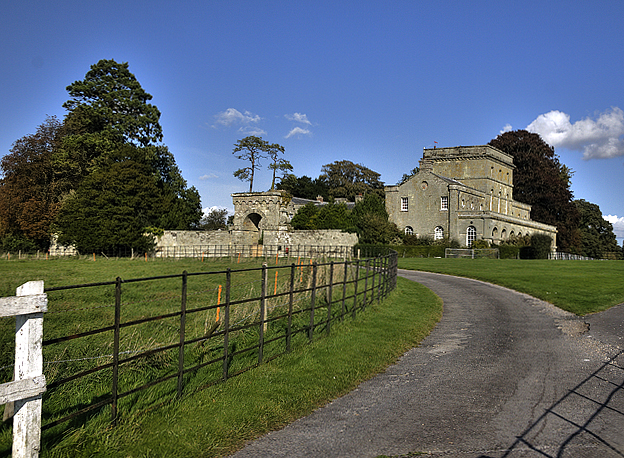
Remaining service wing of Eastbury Park

At the 1715 general election, Dodington was returned unopposed as MP for Bridgwater. Also from 1715 he was Lord Lieutenant of Somerset. He became very rich and commissioned Sir John Vanbrugh to design a large mansion to be built on his estate in Eastbury.

== Death and legacy ==
Dodington died on 28 March 1720 and left his estate to his nephew George Bubb, who assumed the surname of Dodington by a private act of Parliament, Bubb's Name Act 1717 (4 Geo. 1. c. 1 Pr.). He also commissioned the building of Eastbury Park.

Parliament of England
Preceded by George Clarke; James Hayes	Member of Parliament for Winchelsea; 1705–1707; With: James Hayes	Succeeded by Parliament of Great Britain
Parliament of Ireland
Preceded by John Caulfeild; John Davys	Member of Parliament for Charlemont; 1707–1713; With: John Davys	Succeeded by Hon. James Caulfeild; Andrew Lloyd
Parliament of Great Britain
Preceded by Parliament of England	Member of Parliament for Winchelsea; 1707–1708; With: James Hayes 1707–08; Sir Francis Dashwood, Bt 1708	Succeeded by Sir Francis Dashwood, Bt; Robert Bristow
Preceded by George Balch; Sir Thomas Wroth	Member of Parliament for Bridgwater; 1708–1713; With: George Balch 1708–10; Nathaniel Palmer 1710–13	Succeeded by Nathaniel Palmer; John Rolle
Preceded by Sir Francis Dashwood, Bt; Robert Bristow	Member of Parliament for Winchelsea; 1713–1715; With: Robert Bristow	Succeeded by Robert Bristow; George Bubb
Preceded by Nathaniel Palmer; John Rolle	Member of Parliament for Bridgwater; 1715–1720; With: Thomas Palmer	Succeeded by Thomas Palmer; William Pitt
Political offices
Preceded by Edward Southwell	Chief Secretary for Ireland; 1707–1708	Succeeded by Joseph Addison
Honorary titles
Preceded by The Earl of Orrery	Lord Lieutenant of Somerset; 1715–1720	Succeeded by George Bubb Dodington
Preceded by Sir William Wyndham	Vice-Admiral of Somerset; 1715–1720	Succeeded by George Bubb Dodington
