= George Clarke (British politician) =

British politician and architect (1661–1736)

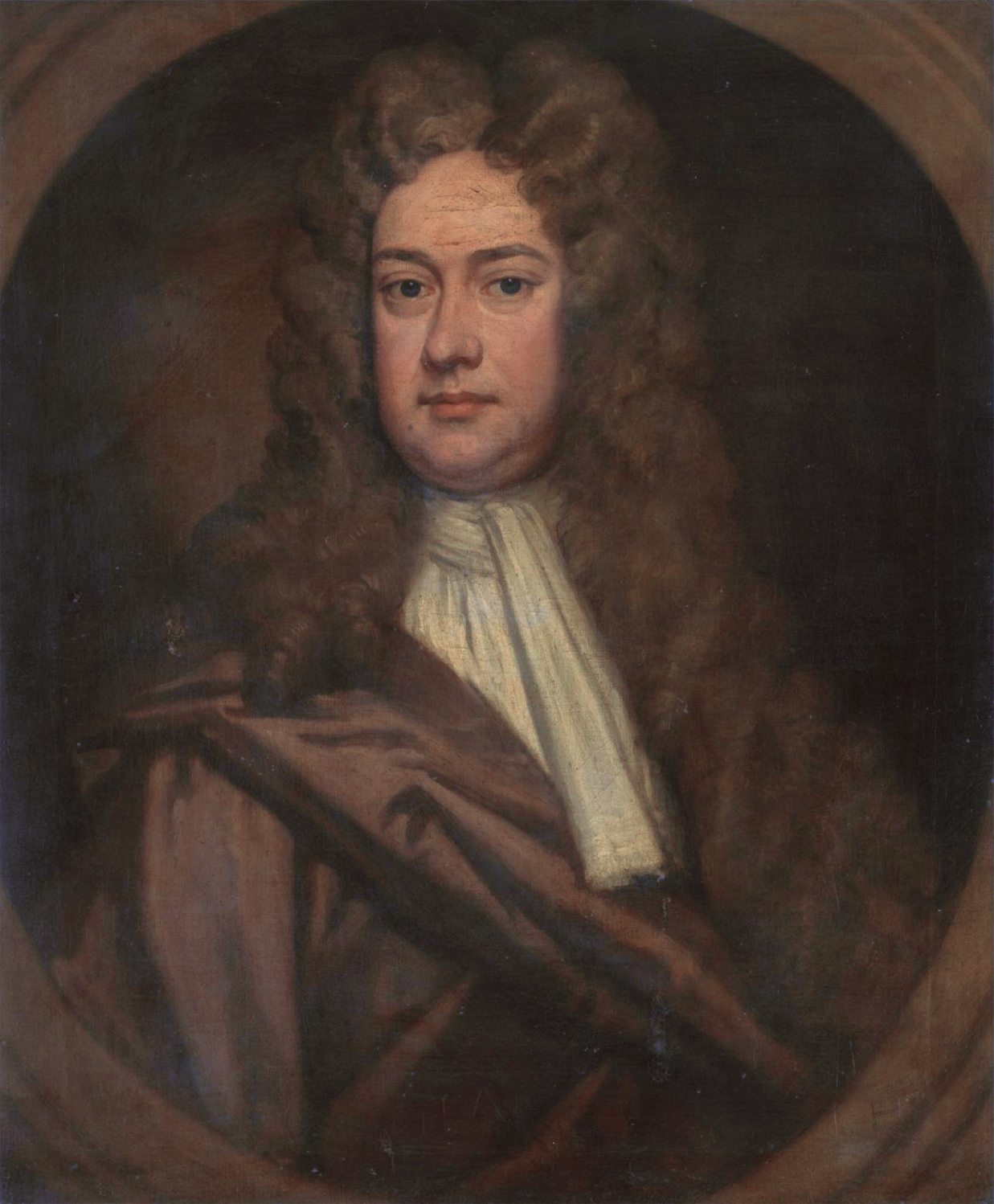
- Portrait of Clarke by the studio of Godfrey Kneller

Member of Parliament
- In office 1717–1736
- Preceded by: William Whitelock
- Succeeded by: William Bromley
- Constituency: Oxford University
- In office 1711–1713
- Preceded by: Henry Hyde
- Succeeded by: Edward Herle
- Constituency: Launceston
- In office 1705–1708
- Preceded by: John Hayes
- Succeeded by: Harry Trelawny
- Constituency: Winchelsea (1702–1705); East Looe (1705–1708)

Secretary at War
- In office 1690–1704
- Monarch: William III
- Preceded by: William Blathwayt
- Succeeded by: Henry St John

Personal details
- Born: 7 May 1661
- Died: 22 October 1736 (aged 75)
- Education: Brasenose College, Oxford

George Clarke (7 May 1661 – 22 October 1736) was a British Tory politician and architect who represented Winchelsea, East Looe, Launceston and Oxford University in the English and British House of Commons between 1702 and 1736.

== Life ==
George Clarke was born on 7 May 1661, the son of the politician Sir William Clarke. He enrolled at Brasenose College, Oxford in 1676, and was elected a fellow of All Souls College, Oxford four years later. Clarke was returned in a contested by-election on 23 November 1685 as Member of Parliament for Oxford University, but never took his seat as Parliament had been prorogued. He became Judge Advocate to the English Army and was Secretary at War in Ireland from 1690 to 1692 and in England from 1693 to 1704 under William III of England and Queen Anne. He served as secretary to Prince George of Denmark, Queen Anne's consort and the Lord High Admiral and Generalissimo of England.

Clarke was returned as Member of Parliament for Winchelsea at the 1702 English general election, coinciding with his office as Joint Secretary of the Admiralty. At the 1705 English general election he was returned as MP for East Looe. He was not nominated for a seat at the 1708 British general election. He was returned in a by-election on 29 May 1711 as MP for Launceston from 1711. He did not stand at the 1713 British general election. Over the latter period he was Lord Commissioner of the Admiralty from 20 December 1710 until 14 October 1714, when he was dismissed following the accession of George I.

Clarke returned to the House of Commons as MP for Oxford University at a by-election on 4 December 1717 following the death of William Whitelock. He was reelected in 1722, 1727, and 1734, by which point he had lost his left eye and was losing sight in the other.

He was also an amateur architect. His known work is largely confined to Oxford, (Clayton's DNB entry for Clarke offers more detail of his architectural endeavours) and he is known to have designed buildings and also to have collaborated with Nicholas Hawksmoor, amongst others.

Timothy Clayton discusses Clarke's print collection, noting "John Vanburgh, Alexander Pope and George Vertue travelled to Oxford to use his library with its unique collection of notes and drawings by [Inigo] Jones" (Clayton 1992, p. 124).

The library of Worcester College, Oxford houses Clarke's collection of books, MSS, prints and drawings. Building work on the library, which was started within a few years of the college's founding in 1714, was completed in 1736. A spat between Clarke and All Souls resulted in the bequest to Worcester.

== List of architectural works ==
The library in the Peckwater Quad, Christ Church, Oxford (1717–38)

Rebuilt The Queen's College, Oxford, with Hawksmoor (1710–21)

The New Buildings, Magdalen College, Oxford (1733)

The Hall, Chapel and Library, Worcester College, Oxford (1733–1753)

The Rectory, Kingston Bagpuize (c.1723)

Cokethorpe House, alterations (c.1710)

== Gallery of architectural work ==
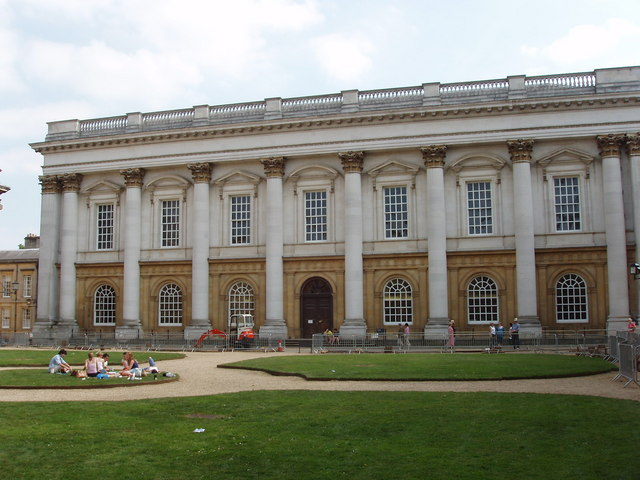
The Library, Christ Church, Oxford

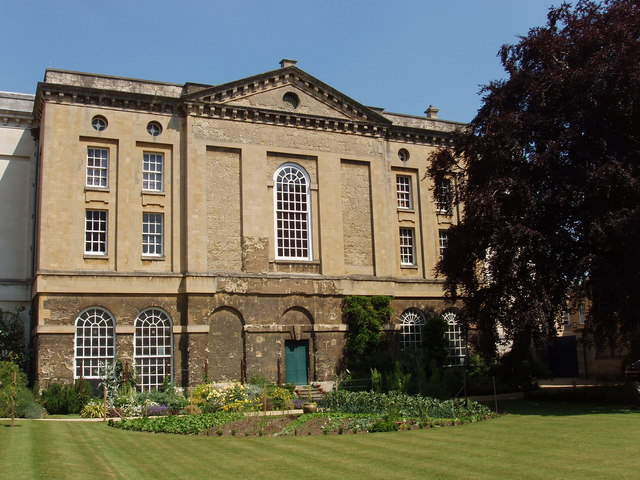
The rear of The Library, Christ Church, Oxford

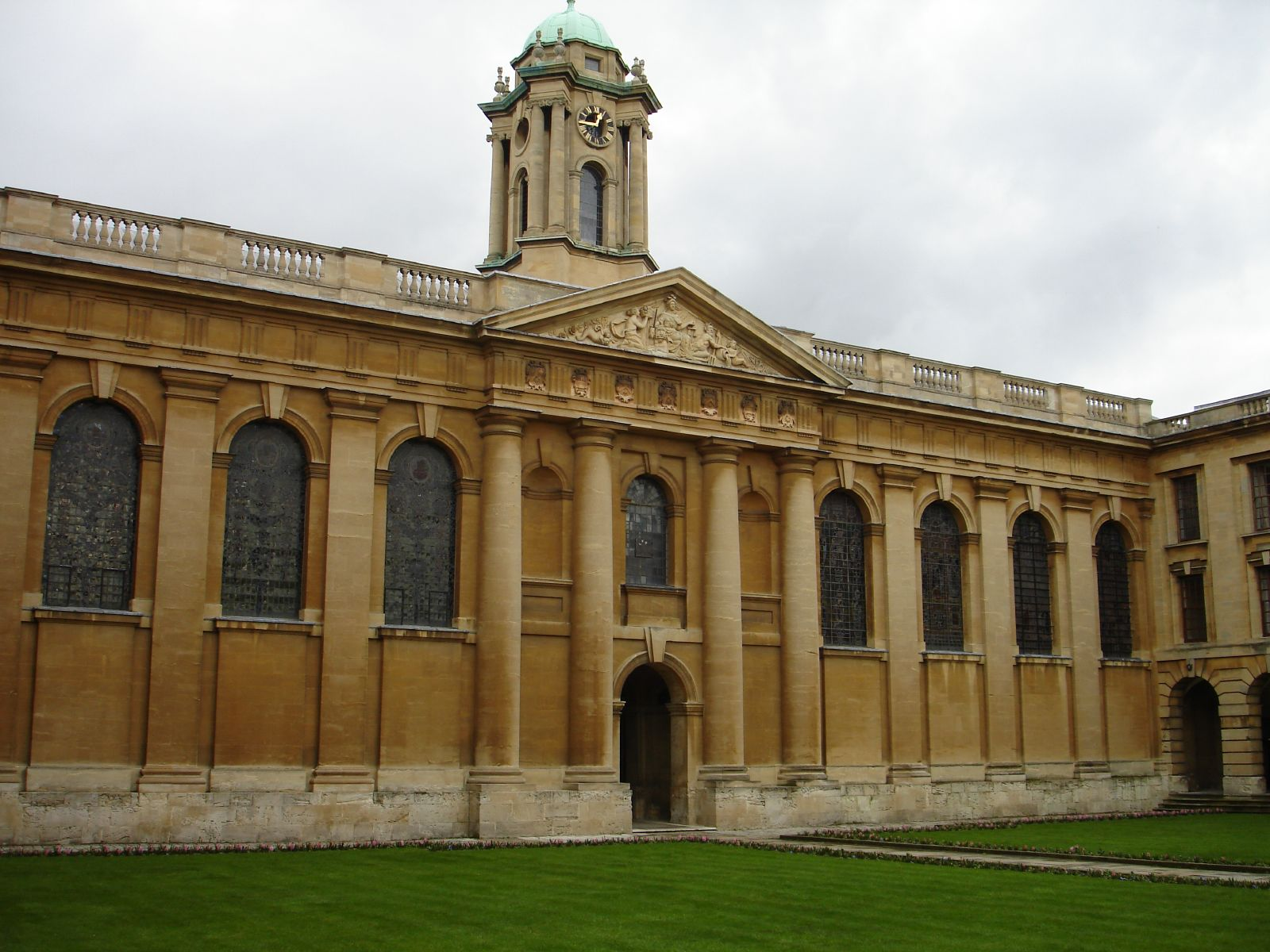
Quad, The Queens' College Oxford

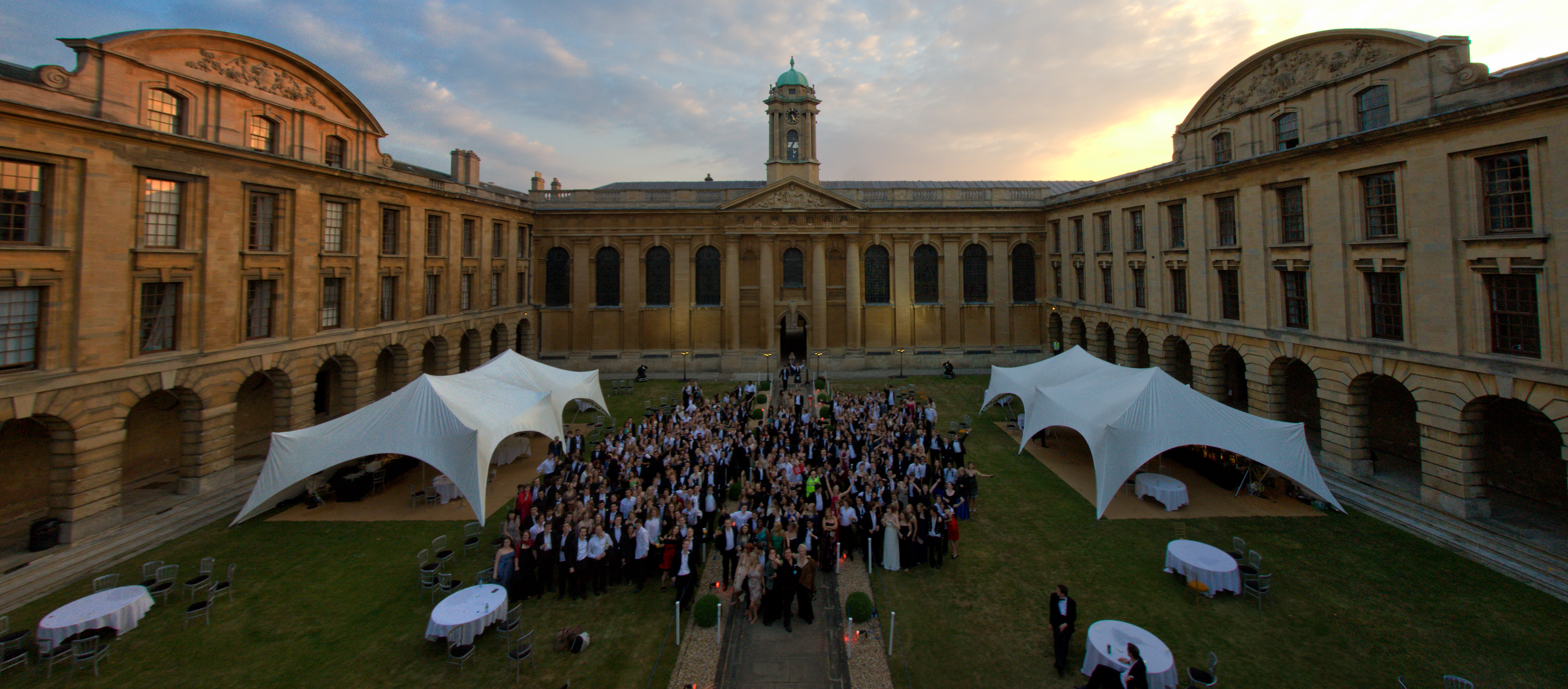
Quad, The Queens' College Oxford

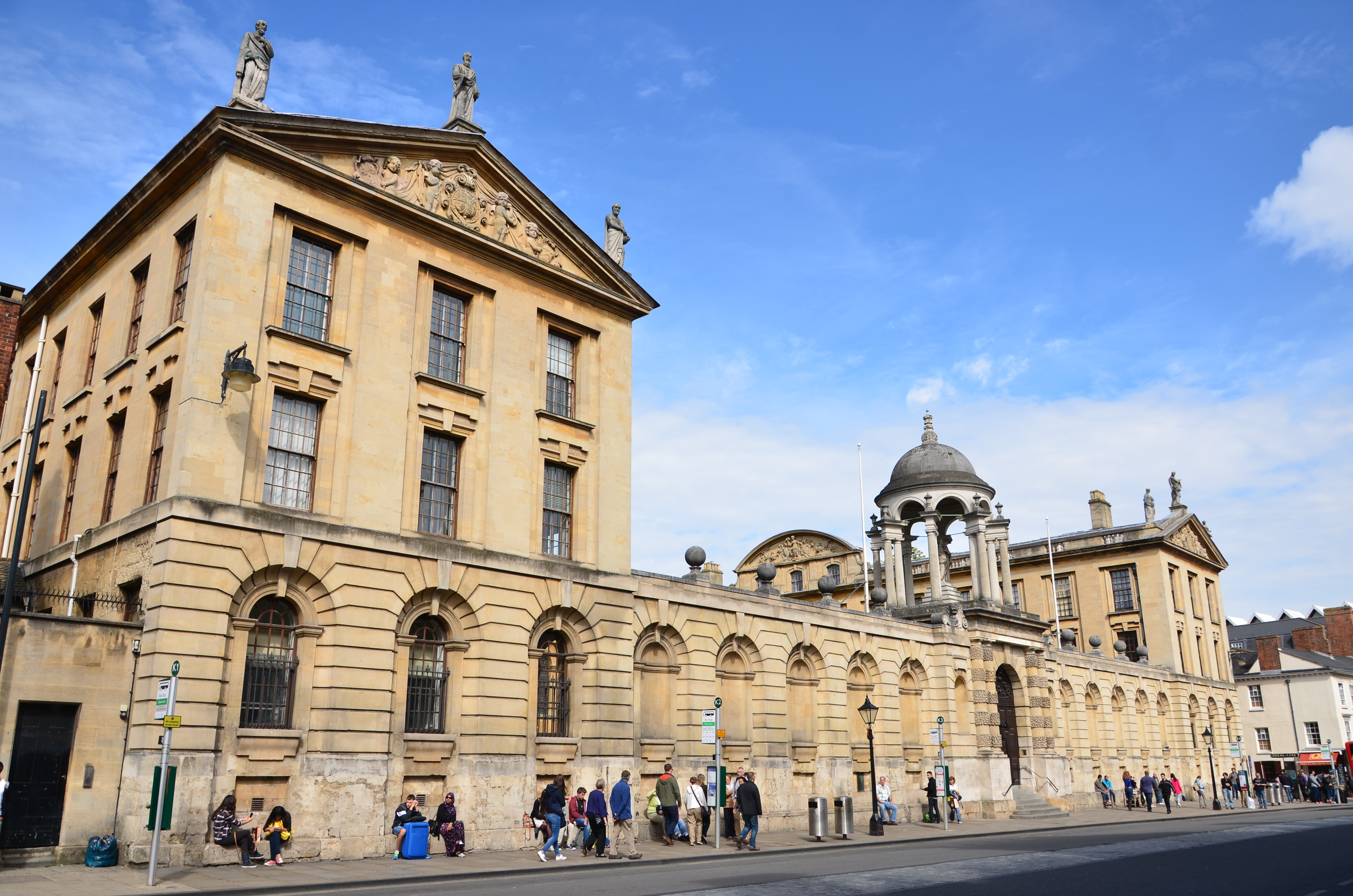
High Street front, The Queens' College Oxford

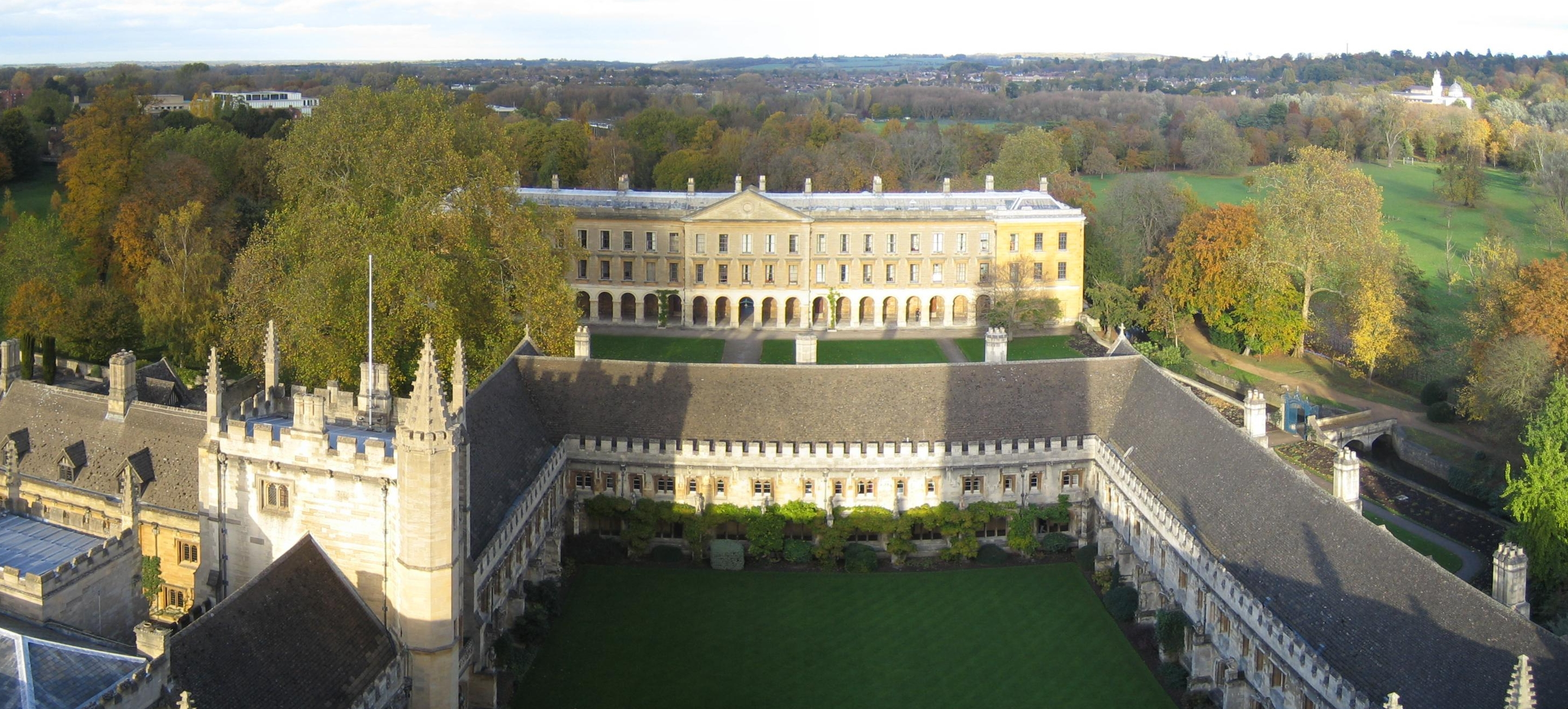
Magdalen College, Oxford, New Buildings in the background

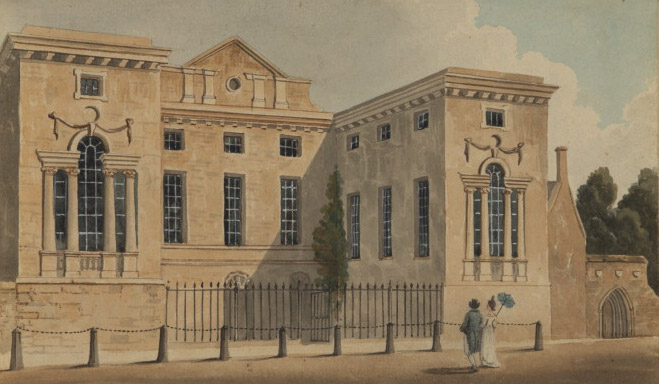
Front, Worcester College, Oxford

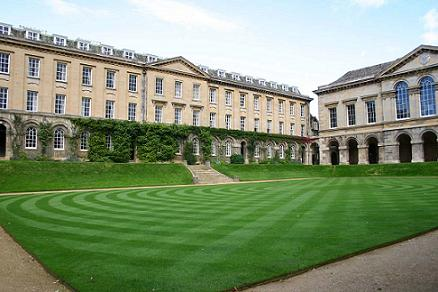
Quad, Worcester College, Oxford

Parliament of England
| Preceded by John Hayes; Robert Austen | Member of Parliament for Winchelsea; 1702–1705; With: James Hayes | Succeeded by George Dodington; James Hayes |
| Preceded by Sir John Pole, Bt; Sir Henry Seymour, Bt | Member of Parliament for East Looe; 1705–1707; With: Sir Henry Seymour, Bt | Succeeded by Parliament of Great Britain |
Parliament of Great Britain
| Preceded by Parliament of England | Member of Parliament for East Looe; 1707–1708; With: Sir Henry Seymour, Bt | Succeeded by Harry Trelawny; Sir Henry Seymour, Bt |
| Preceded by Lord Hyde; Francis Scobell | Member of Parliament for Launceston; 1711–1713; With: Francis Scobell | Succeeded by Edward Herle; John Anstis |
| Preceded by Sir William Whitelock; William Bromley | Member of Parliament for Oxford University; 1717–1736; With: William Bromley 1717–1732; Viscount Cornbury 1732–1736 | Succeeded by Viscount Cornbury; William Bromley |
