= John Eyre, 1st Baron Eyre =

Irish politician

The Right Honourable The Lord Eyre

Member of Parliament for Galway Town
- In office 1748–1768 Serving with Thomas Staunton, Hon. Richard FitzPatrick, Denis Daly
- Preceded by: Thomas Staunton; Hon. Richard FitzPatrick
- Succeeded by: James Daly; Robert French

Personal details
- Born: John Eyre c. 1720
- Died: 30 September 1781 (aged 60–61)
- Spouse: Eleanor Staunton (after 1746)
- Parent(s): Giles Eyre; Mary Cox Eyre
- Education: Trinity College Dublin

John Eyre, 1st Baron Eyre (c. 1720 – 30 September 1781), was an Irish politician.

== Early life ==
Eyre was the son of the Very Reverend Giles Eyre, Dean of Killaloe, by Mary Cox, granddaughter of Sir Richard Cox, 1st Baronet, Lord Chancellor of Ireland. He was the grandson of John Eyre, Member of Parliament for County Galway, and the great-grandson of John Eyre, Mayor of Galway. His uncle John Eyre also represented County Galway in the Irish House of Commons.

He was educated at Trinity College Dublin.

== Career ==
Eyre returned to the Irish House of Commons for Galway Town in 1748, a seat he held until 1768. The latter year he was raised to the Peerage of Ireland as Baron Eyre, of Eyrecourt in the County of Galway.

== Personal life ==
In 1746, Lord Eyre married Eleanor Staunton, daughter of James Staunton. Together, they were the parents of:

- Hon. Mary Eyre (d. 1775), who married Hon. Francis Caulfeild, MP, second son of James Caulfeild, 3rd Viscount Charlemont.
- John Eyre (1747–1747), who died in infancy.

He died in September 1781. Eyre had no surviving sons and the barony died with him.

=== Descendants ===
Through his daughter Mary, he was a grandfather of Eleanor Caulfeild, who married William Howard, 3rd Earl of Wicklow, the former MP for St Johnstown.

Parliament of Ireland
Preceded by Thomas Staunton; Hon. Richard FitzPatrick	Member of Parliament for Galway Town; 1748–1768; With: Thomas Staunton 1748–1760; Hon. Richard FitzPatrick 1761–1767; Denis Daly 1767–1768	Succeeded by James Daly; Robert French
Peerage of Ireland
New creation	Baron Eyre; 1768–1781	Extinct
