= Custos Rotulorum of County Armagh =

Highest civil officer in County Armagh, Ireland

The Custos Rotulorum of County Armagh was the highest civil officer in County Armagh, Ireland. The position was later combined with that of Lord Lieutenant of Armagh.

== Incumbents ==
- 1661–1671 William Caulfeild, 1st Viscount Charlemont (also Custos Rotulorum of Tyrone)
- ? –?1681 Sir Hans Hamilton, 1st Baronet (died 1681)
- ?1681–?1692 Sir Robert Hamilton, 1st Baronet (died 1703)
- 1692–? William Caulfeild, 2nd Viscount Charlemont (died 1726) (also Custos Rotulorum of Tyrone)
- 1760–1799 James Caulfeild, 1st Earl of Charlemont
- 1800–1849 Archibald Acheson, 2nd Earl of Gosford

For later custodes rotulorum, see Lord Lieutenant of Armagh
