= Eastbury Park =

Country estate in Dorset, England

Coordinates: 50°54′49″N 2°05′52″W

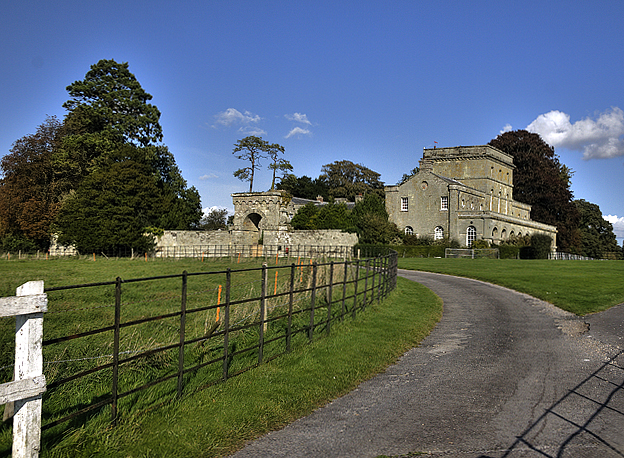
Eastbury House: The former service wing of Eastbury House is all that remains now of John Vanbrugh's once great mansion, his third largest and one of his most important, ranking alongside Blenheim Palace

Eastbury Park was a country estate near Tarrant Gunville in Dorset, England. It contained a large mansion designed by Sir John Vanbrugh. The mansion has not survived, but its former service wing has become a country house known as Eastbury House, a Grade I listed building.

== History ==
The house was designed by Vanbrugh for George Dodington, who was Secretary to the Treasurer of the Navy. Construction started in 1718 and was completed under the stewardship of Dodington's nephew, George Dodington, 1st Baron Melcombe, in 1738 at a final cost £140,000: it had a large garden which was designed by Charles Bridgeman. The house was inherited by Richard Grenville-Temple, 2nd Earl Temple in 1762, who had no use for it, and he had it demolished in 1782.

It was bought by Thomas Wedgwood, son of Josiah Wedgwood and pioneer of early photography in 1800; his brother Josiah Wedgwood II had bought the adjacent Gunville House in Tarrant Gunville in 1799.

The service wing, designed by Vanbrugh and built at the same time as the rest of the mansion, survived the demolition and became known as Eastbury House. It became a Grade I listed building in 1955. The parklands are Grade II* listed in the National Register of Historic Parks and Gardens.
