= Robert Bristow (1688–1737) =

English politician

Robert Bristow (18 October 1688 – 3 November 1737) of Micheldever in Hampshire was an English politician.

His father Robert (1662–1706) and his brother John were both Members of Parliament.

Bristow himself was a director of the Bank of England from 1713 to 1716 and 1718 to 1720 and a director of the East India Company from 1716 to 1717. He was a Member of Parliament (MP) for Winchelsea from 1708 to 1737, and was employed in the royal household as Clerk of the Green Cloth from 1720 until his death.

He married Sarah, the daughter of Sir John Ward, MP. His son Robert (1712–1776) was also an MP.

Parliament of the United Kingdom
Preceded by George Dodington; Sir Francis Dashwood, Bt	Member of Parliament for Winchelsea; 1708–1737; With: Sir Francis Dashwood, Bt to 1713; George Dodington (died 1720) 1713–15; George Bubb 1715–22; Thomas Townshend 1722–27; John Scrope 1727–28; Sir Archer Croft, Bt February–April 1728; Peter Walter April 1728 – 1734; Edmund Hungate Beaghan from 1734	Succeeded by Edmund Hungate Beaghan; Robert Bristow (son)
