= Custos Rotulorum of Tyrone =

The Custos Rotulorum of Tyrone was the highest civil officer in County Tyrone, Ireland. The position was later combined with that of Lord Lieutenant of Tyrone.

== Incumbents ==
- 1661–1671 William Caulfeild, 1st Viscount Charlemont (also Custos Rotulorum of County Armagh)
- 1692–? William Caulfeild, 2nd Viscount Charlemont (died 1726) (also Custos Rotulorum of County Armagh)
- c.1790–1818 Thomas Knox, 1st Viscount Northland
- 1819–1841 Somerset Lowry-Corry, 2nd Earl Belmore

For later custodes rotulorum, see Lord Lieutenant of Tyrone
