= Mrs Caulfield =

Louisa Caulfield (née Matley, 23 April 1817 – 11 September 1870), known as Mrs Caulfield, was an English music hall singer active in the 1850s and 1860s.

She was born in London, and married John Caulfield (1810–1865), an actor. Mrs Caulfield was one of the first female entertainers to appear at Evans's Supper Rooms and at the Canterbury Music Hall, where her husband became the Chairman. She specialised in versions of popular comic songs, with the words often rewritten to give a female perspective. Her most successful songs included "Keemo Kimo, Polly Won't You Try Me, Oh?", a version of a folk song that had been absorbed into the American minstrel tradition; and "The Captain with his Whiskers", again adapted from an earlier tune and popularised in the United States.

She appeared on stage in the 1860s with her husband and their two daughters. One of their daughters, born Louisa Caulfield (1845- after 1907), took the stage name Lennox Grey from that of her first husband, and also became a theatre performer.

Mrs Caulfield died in 1870, in Lambeth, London.
