= Sidney Caulfield =

English architect

Sidney Burgoyne Kitchener Caulfield (1877–1964) was head of architecture at the Central School of Arts and Crafts. He succeeded Halsey Ricardo. He designed a number of buildings at Hampstead Garden Suburb.
