= William Caulfeild, 2nd Viscount Charlemont =

Irish soldier and peer (c.1655–1726)

William Caulfeild, 2nd Viscount Charlemont, PC (c. 1655 – 21 July 1726) was an Irish soldier and peer.

== Life ==
Caulfeild was the son of William Caulfeild, 1st Viscount Charlemont of County Armagh, whom he succeeded in 1671 and Sarah Moore, daughter of Charles Moore, 2nd Viscount Moore of Drogheda. He was educated at Trinity College, Dublin.

He was an avid pro-Williamite in the struggle between William of Orange and King James II of England for the British crown, and was consequently attainted by King James' first Parliament in 1689. He was rewarded by William for his loyalty by being put in command of a regiment of infantry and created Custos Rotulorum of Tyrone and Armagh. After Willams's victory, the regiment was disbanded but in 1701 he was given command of the new 36th Foot Regiment and promoted in 1704 to the rank of Brigadier-General. He took the regiment to Spain, taking part in the Siege of Barcelona and the attack on Fort Montjuïc in 1705. Although contentiously removed from his command of the regiment, he was nevertheless promoted in 1707 to the rank of Major-General and made Governor of Counties Armagh and Tyrone.

On 11 July 1678, he married Anne, the only daughter of James Margetson, Archbishop of Armagh, and they had five sons and seven daughters. His eldest son was James. Another son, Thomas, was an early British Lieutenant-Governor of Nova Scotia. One of Caulfeild's great-granddaughters, Sophia Frances Anne Caulfeild, was an author, poet and encyclopedist.

In May 1726, he was made a Privy Counsellor but died in Dublin shortly afterwards and was buried in the vault of the family in Armagh. He was succeeded by James, his eldest surviving son.

Peerage of the United Kingdom
Preceded by William Caulfeild	Viscount Charlemont; 1671–1726	Succeeded by James Caulfeild
