= Thomas Adderley =

Former MP for Charlemont, County Armagh

Thomas Adderley (1715-91) was an Irish politician.

Adderley was educated at Trinity College, Dublin. From 1752 to 1761, he was MP for Charlemont in County Armagh.

He married his cousin Elizabeth following the death of her husband James Caulfeild, 3rd Viscount Charlemont becoming the step-father of James Caulfeild, 1st Earl of Charlemont. He was his sole guardian following the death of Elizabeth in 1743.

He lived at Donnycarney house which he later left to James Caulfeild and which later became the location of Marino House.
