= Charlemont (Parliament of Ireland constituency) =

Pre-1801 Irish constituency

Coordinates: 54.468°N 6.684°W

- Former borough constituency for the Irish House of Commons
- County: County Armagh
- Borough: Charlemont

1613–1801
- Seats: 2
- Replaced by: Disfranchised

Charlemont was a constituency represented in the Irish House of Commons, the house of representatives of the Kingdom of Ireland, from 1613 to 1800.

It represented Charlemont, County Armagh, an important military post since the founding of Charlemont Fort in 1602.

== History ==
In the Patriot Parliament of 1689 summoned by James II, Charlemont was not represented. It was disenfranchised under the Acts of Union 1800.

== Members of Parliament, 1613–1801 ==
- 1613–1315 Sir Edward Moore and Faithful Fortescue
- 1634–1635 Chichester Fortescue and Hon Arthur Moore
- 1639–1649 John Marten and Henry Brome
- 1661–1666 Thomas Caulfeild and Thomas Howard (died and replaced 1665 by Sir Michael Appelyard)

=== 1689–1801 ===
Election	First MP		Second MP
1689	Charlemont was not represented in the Patriot Parliament		
1692	Richard Gorges		William Stewart
1695	Stephen Ludlow		Edward Riley
1703	Hon. John Caulfeild		Hon. James Caulfeild
1705	Hon. John Caulfeild		John Davys
1707	George Dodington		John Davys
1713	Hon. James Caulfeild		Andrew Lloyd
1715	Hon. James Caulfeild		Humphrey May
1723	Hon. James Caulfeild		John Caulfeild
1727	John Moore		John Caulfeild
1752	Thomas Adderley		John Caulfeild
1761	Francis Caulfeild		Henry William Moore
1763	Francis Caulfeild		Annesley Stewart (Note: Succeeded as 6th Baronet in 1769.)
1775	Henry Grattan	Patriot	Annesley Stewart
1790	Richard Sheridan		Annesley Stewart
1794	Richard Mountney Jephson		Annesley Stewart
January 1798	Richard Mountney Jephson		Viscount Caulfield (Note: Also elected for County Armagh in 1798, for which he chose to sit.)
1798	Richard Mountney Jephson		William Conyngham Plunket
1798	Francis Dobbs	Patriot	William Conyngham Plunket
1801	Disenfranchised		

== Bibliography ==
- O'Hart, John (2007). The Irish and Anglo-Irish Landed Gentry: When Cromwell came to Ireland. Vol. II. Heritage Books. ISBN 978-0-7884-1927-0.
- Leigh Rayment's historical List of Members of the Irish House of Commons. Cites: Johnston-Liik, Edith Mary (2002). The History of the Irish Parliament 1692-1800 (6 volumes). Ulster Historical Foundation.
