= Francis Caulfeild =

Irish politician

The Honourable Francis Caulfeild (c. 1730 – November 1775), was an Irish politician who represented County Armagh and Charlemont.

== Early life ==
Caulfeild was born in Chester in c. 1730. He was the second surviving son of James Caulfeild, 3rd Viscount Charlemont and Elizabeth Bernard. His elder brother inherited their father's viscountcy and was further ennobled as James Caulfeild, 1st Earl of Charlemont. His sister, Hon. Alicia Caulfeild, married John Browne, 1st Baron Kilmaine.

His maternal grandparents were Alice (née Ludlow) Bernard (a daughter of Stephen Ludlow, Clerk of the Court of Chancery) and Francis Bernard, MP and judge of the Court of Common Pleas.

Like his father before him, Caulfeild was educated at Trinity College Dublin.

== Career ==
He represented County Armagh from 1758 to 1761 and Charlemont from 1761 to 1776.

== Personal life ==
On 11 October 1760 Caulfeild was married to Hon. Mary Eyre (d. 1775), only daughter of John Eyre, 1st Baron Eyre and Eleanor Staunton (a daughter of James Staunton). Together, they were the parents of:

- James Eyre Caulfeild (b. 1765) who married twice but died in 1837 without issue
- Eleanor Caulfeild (d. 1807), who married William Howard, 3rd Earl of Wicklow, the former MP for St Johnstown, in 1787.

Caulfeild died in November (or 19 October?) 1775, in a shipwreck in the Irish sea, with his wife and a daughter aged 3. His son, and daughter Eleanor, were not on board.
