= Billy Caulfield =

English footballer (1892–1972)

Personal information
- Full name: William Caulfield
- Date of birth: 20 March 1892
- Place of birth: Haydock, Lancashire, England
- Date of death: January quarter 1972 (aged 79)
- Place of death: Haydock, Lancashire, England
- Height: 5 ft 6 in (1.68 m)
- Positions: Inside forward; outside forward

Senior career*
Years	Team	Apps	(Gls)
19??–1913	Ormskirk		
1913–1915	Southport Central		
1915–1919	Blackburn Rovers	0	(0)
1919–1920	Southport		
1920–1923	Crewe Alexandra	59	(23)
1923–1924	Nelson	18	(5)
1924–1925	Crewe Alexandra	29	(0)
1925–19??	Chester		
- * Club domestic league appearances and goals

William Caulfield (20 March 1892 – January quarter 1972) was an English professional footballer who played as a forward. Born in Haydock, Lancashire, he began his career in local football with Ormskirk. He later played for Southport Central before moving into the Football League with Blackburn Rovers in February 1915. However, due to the outbreak of the First World War and the subsequent suspension of competitive football in England, he failed to make an appearance for the club.

In 1919, Caulfield returned to Southport (the club had dropped "Central" from its name), who by then were playing in the Central League. After one season with Southport, he moved to fellow Central League outfit Crewe Alexandra in the summer of 1920, initially as an amateur player. Crewe were founding members of the Football League Third Division North at the start of the 1921–22 campaign, and Caulfield signed a professional contract with the club in the summer of 1921. Over the next two seasons, he went on to make 59 League appearances for Crewe, scoring 23 goals during this time.

In July 1923 Caulfield joined Nelson, who had just been promoted to the Football League Second Division for the first time in their history. During pre-season training he suffered a groin injury that forced him to miss the first three months of the campaign. When Caulfield eventually made his debut for Nelson on 3 November 1923, he scored two goals in a 3–0 win over Coventry City at Seedhill. During the remainder of the 1923–24 season, he played 18 League matches and scored a total of five goals. In September 1924, Caulfield was released by Nelson and returned to Crewe Alexandra. In a solitary season with the side, he made 29 appearances but did not score any goals. In the summer of 1925, Caulfield joined Chester, his final club.
