= Elizabeth Jane Caulfeild, Countess of Charlemont =

Irish aristocrat

Elizabeth Jane Caulfeild
- Countess of Charlemont
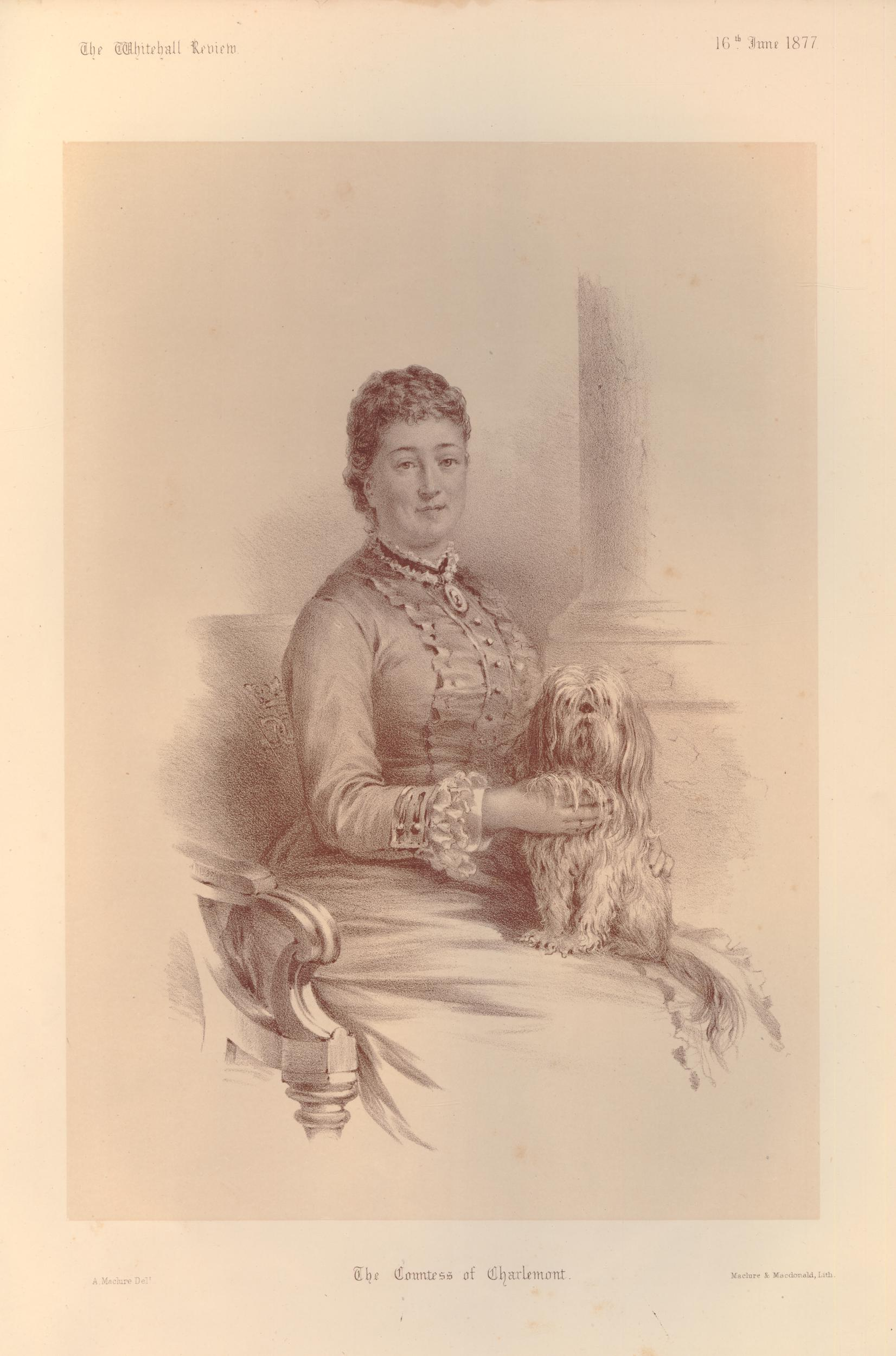
- Elizabeth Jane Caulfeild, Countess of Charlemont, 1877
- Born: 21 June 21, 1834
- Died: 31 May 1882; Roxborough Castle, Moy, County Tyrone, Ireland
- Spouse: James Caulfeild, 3rd Earl of Charlemont
- Parents: William Somerville, 1st Baron Athlumney
- Father: Lady Maria Harriet Conyngham

Elizabeth Jane Caulfeild (June 21, 1834 – May 31, 1882) was the only daughter of William Meredyth, first Lord Athlumney, and by marriage in December 1856 to James Caulfeild, 3rd Earl of Charlemont, she became the Countess of Charlemont.

== Convert to Judaism ==
Although a Christian by upbringing, Caulfeild converted to Judaism. She became a regular attendant at synagogue worship, often seeking advice in spiritual matters from rabbis. Lady Charlemont resided in the country near Belfast, the synagogue of which town she frequently attended; while in London she worshipped at the services of the Bayswater and Central synagogues. She was a woman of varied accomplishments, an excellent linguist, and a good musician. She possessed a remarkable gift for recitation, which she utilized on behalf of charitable institutions.
