= Toby Caulfeild, 1st Baron Caulfeild =

English army officer

Toby Caulfeild, 1st Baron Caulfeild of Charlemont (1565–1627), was an English army officer active in Ireland.

== Life ==
He was born on 2 December 1565 the son of Alexander Caulfeild of Great Milton in Oxfordshire. As a youth, he served under Martin Frobisher, and then under Lord Howard of Effingham. He was also with the 2nd Earl of Essex at the capture of Cádiz, 21 June 1596.

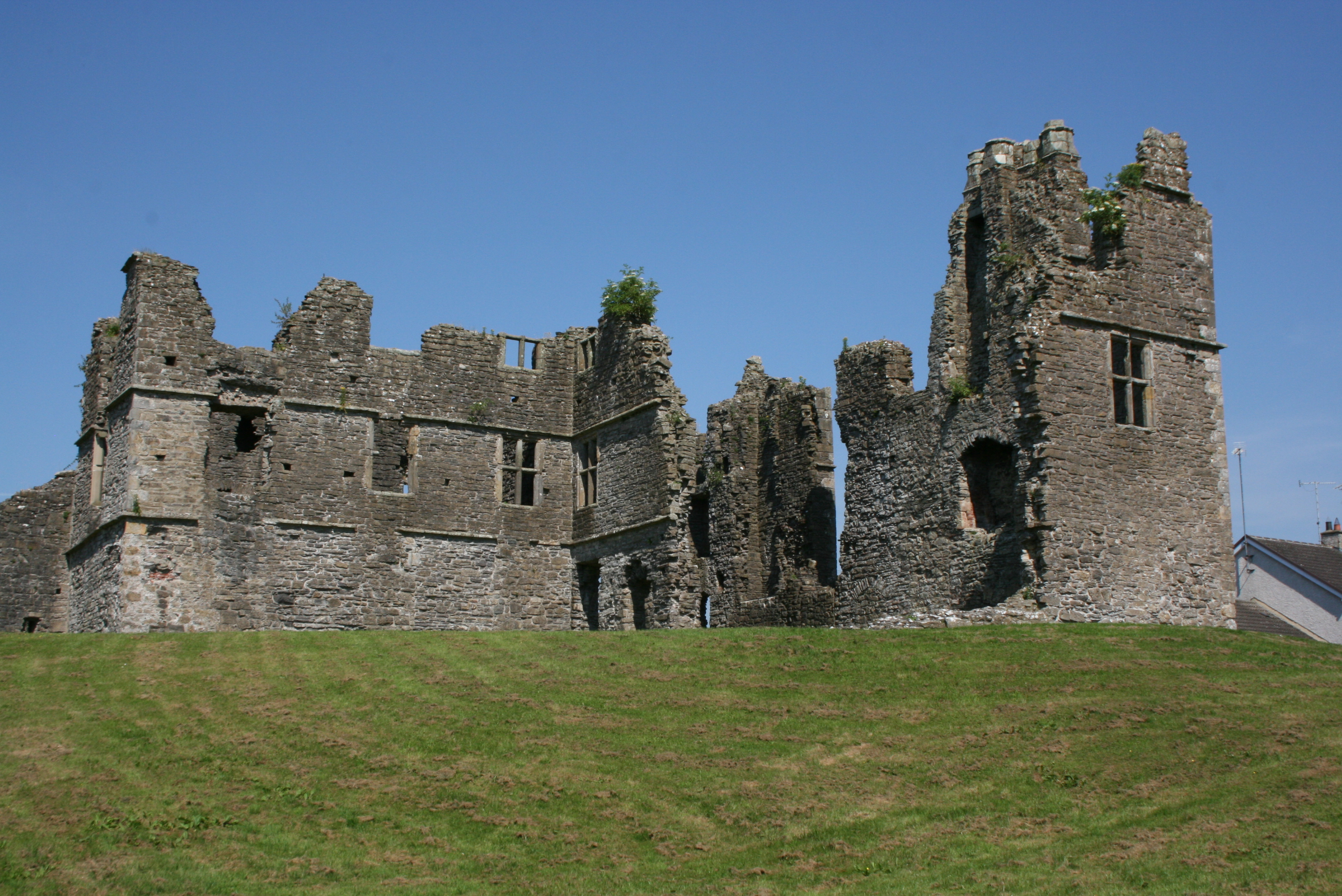
Castle Caulfield ruins, County Tyrone

In 1598 Caulfeild accompanied the Earl of Essex to Ireland, in command of a troop of horse, and was for a time stationed at Newry. In 1601, under Lord Mountjoy, he took part in the recapture of Kinsale from the Spanish invaders. Mountjoy left Caulfeild in charge of a bridge built by him over the River Blackwater, in command of 150 men, where the fort erected for its protection was called Charlemont.

After the accession of James I of England, Caulfeild was knighted. After the Flight of the Earls of 1607, he was appointed receiver of the rents of Hugh O'Neill, Earl of Tyrone until 1610. On the division of the estates, Caulfeild received a grant of a thousand acres on which he built a now ruined house, Castle Caulfield.

He had, in 1608, been appointed to the command of the upper part of Tyrone and of Armagh. On 17 April 1613 he was named a privy councillor, and the same year he was chosen knight of the shire for County Armagh in the Irish Parliament. On 19 February 1615 he was made master of the ordnance and on 10 May of the same year one of the council for the province of Munster. Subsequently, he was appointed a member of the commission for the parcelling out of escheated (confiscated) lands.

In consideration of his services to the crown, Caulfeild was created Baron Charlemont and, as he had not married, the succession of the honour was granted to his nephew, Sir William Caulfeild, son of his brother James. He died on 17 August 1627, and was buried in Christ Church Cathedral, Dublin.

== Notes ==
Attribution

This article incorporates text from a publication now in the public domain: Stephen, Leslie, ed. (1887). "Caulfeild, Toby (1565-1627)". Dictionary of National Biography. Vol. 9. London: Smith, Elder & Co.

Peerage of Ireland
New creation	Baron Caulfeild; 1620–1627	Succeeded by William Caulfeild
