= John Caulfeild =

Irish soldier and politician (1661–1707)

Colonel John Caulfeild (1661–1707), styled The Honourable from birth, was an Irish soldier and politician.

He was the fourth son of the 1st Viscount Charlemont and his wife Hon. Sarah Moore, second daughter of Charles Moore, 2nd Viscount Moore of Drogheda. Caulfield was educated at Trinity College, Dublin and was appointed Burgess of Charlemont in 1697. From 1703 to 1707, he was Member of Parliament (MP) for Charlemont.

Caulfeild was married to Sydney Somerville, daughter of James Somerville. They had a son and a daughter.

Parliament of Ireland
Preceded by Stephen Ludlow; Edward Riley	Member of Parliament for Charlemont; 1703–1707; With: Hon. James Caulfield 1703–1705; John Davys 1705–1707	Succeeded by John Davys; George Dodington
