= James Caulfeild, 1st Earl of Charlemont =

Anglo-Irish politician

The Right Honourable The Earl of Charlemont KP PC (Ire)
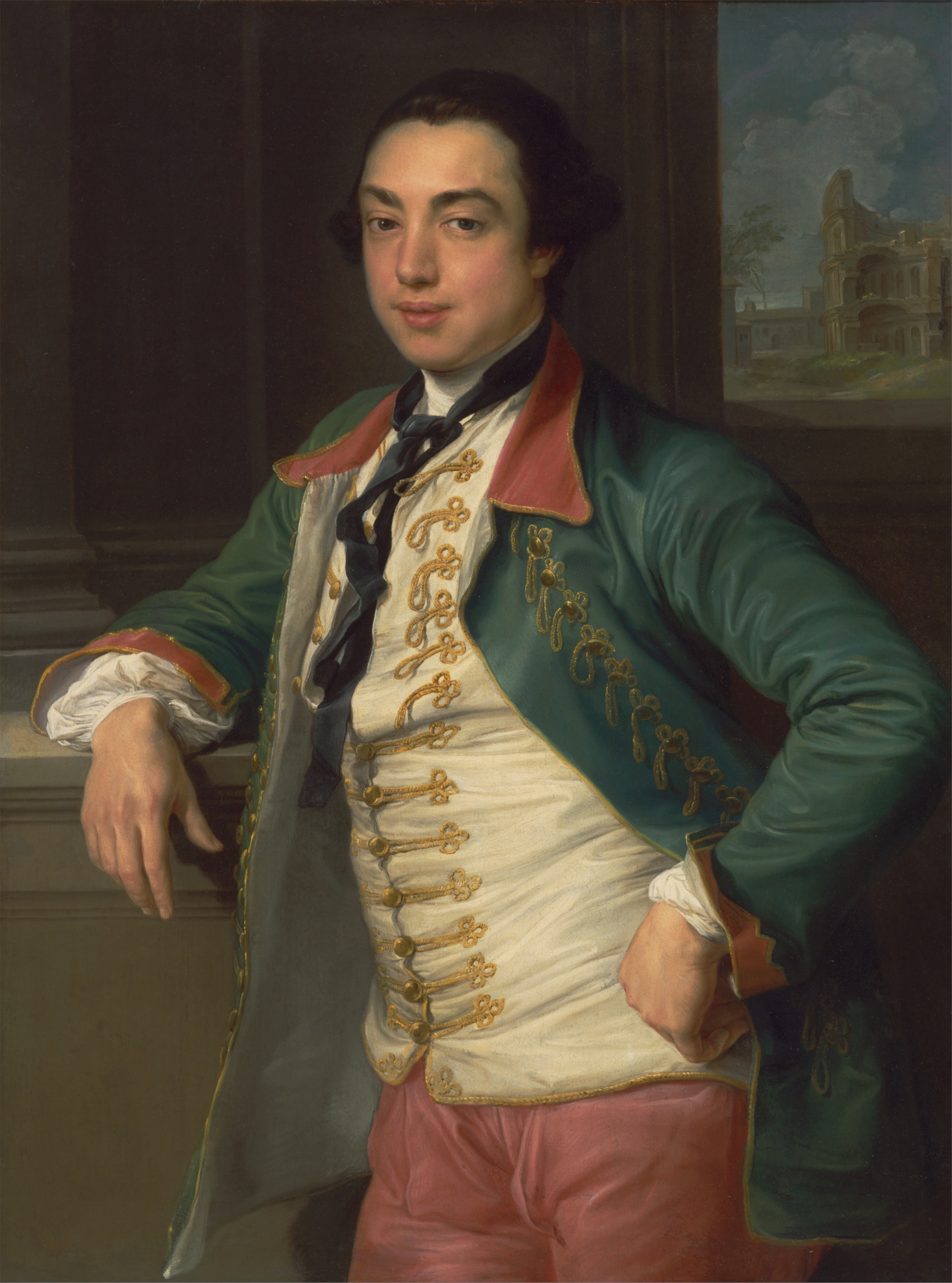
- Portrait by Pompeo Batoni, c. 1753–1756
- Born: 18 August 1728; Dublin, Ireland
- Died: 4 August 1799 (aged 70); Dublin, Ireland

James Caulfeild, 1st Earl of Charlemont, KP, PC (Ire) (18 August 1728 – 4 August 1799) was an Anglo-Irish politician.

== Early life ==
The son of James Caulfeild, 3rd Viscount Charlemont, he was born in Dublin, and succeeded his father as 4th Viscount in 1734. His mother was Elizabeth Bernard, daughter of Francis Bernard, MP and judge of the Court of Common Pleas (Ireland) and Alice Ludlow. After his father's death, she remarried Thomas Adderley, and died in childbirth in 1743 at the age of 40, after the birth of her daughter Elizabeth, who later married Major David Ross. Charlemont was educated at home by private tutors rather than attending a public school. His final tutor, a scholar named Murphy, is credited with fostering Charlemont’s lifelong interest in art and classical culture.

In 1746, he began a period of international travel, commonly known as the Grand Tour, that lasted over nine years. His itinerary included Holland and Italy. During a year of study in Turin, he established a relationship with the philosopher David Hume, who was then serving as secretary to the British embassy, and developed a friendship with the future King Victor Amadeus III of Sardinia. His travels extended to Greece, Turkey, and Egypt. Throughout his journey, Charlemont documented and collected materials regarding the antiquities, customs, and traditions of the regions he visited.

The title of Charlemont descended from Sir Toby Caulfeild (1565–1627) of Oxfordshire, England, who was given lands in Ireland, and created Baron Charlemont (the name of a fort on the Blackwater), for his services to King James I in 1620. The 1st Viscount was the 5th Baron (d. 1671), who was advanced in the peerage by Charles II.

== Art and culture ==
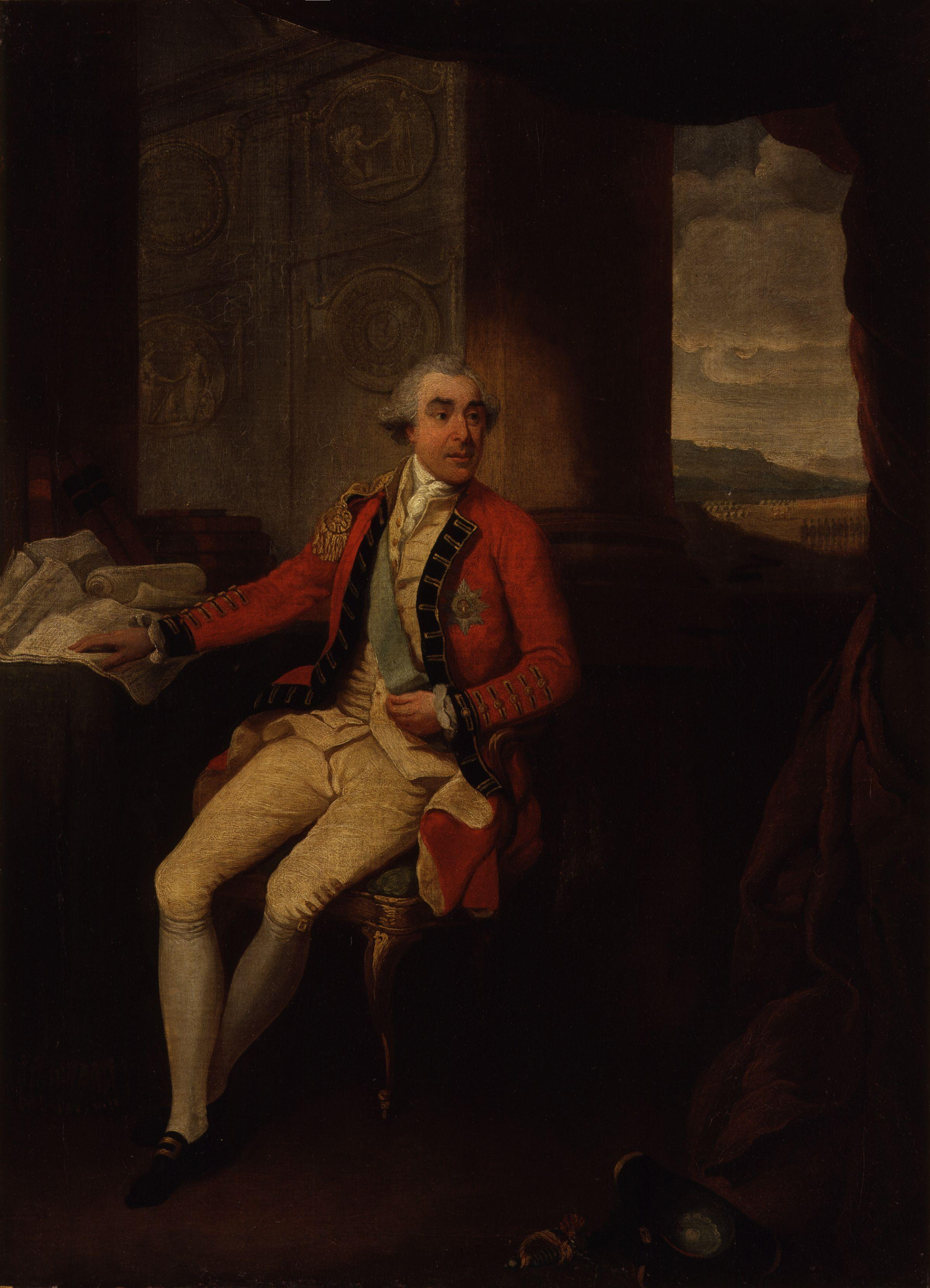
c. 1783 portrait of Charlemont in his Volunteers uniform

Charlemont was well known for his love of Classical art and culture and spent nine years on the Grand Tour in Italy, Greece, Turkey and Egypt. He promised Giovanni Battista Piranesi money to print the 1756 edition of Le antichità romane. When Charlemont did not provide the funds, Piranesi scratched his name from the dedication print inspired by the Roman practice of damnatio memoriae. The artist pleaded his point in Lettere di giustificazione scritte a Milord Charlemont ("Justification letters written to Lord Charlemont") (1757).

He returned to Dublin and employed the Scottish architect Sir William Chambers to remodel his main residence Marino House and the unique Neo-Classical garden pavilion building adjacent, the Casino at Marino, as well as to design his townhouse Charlemont House. His former townhouse at 14 Jervis Street was gifted to the then fledgling Jervis Street Hospital and opened in 1796.

== Politics ==
Charlemont is historically interesting for his political connection with Henry Flood and Henry Grattan; he was a cultivated man with literary and artistic tastes, and both in Dublin and in London he had considerable social influence. He was the first President of the Royal Irish Academy and was a member of the Royal Dublin Society. He was appointed Custos Rotulorum of County Armagh for life in 1760. For various early services in Ireland, he was made an earl in 1763, but he disregarded court favours and cordially joined Grattan in 1780 in the assertion of Irish independence.

In 1783, he was made a founding Knight of the Order of St Patrick. He was president of the volunteer convention in Dublin in November 1783, having taken a leading part in the formation of the Irish Volunteers; and he was a strong opponent of the proposals for the Union. His eldest son, who succeeded him, was subsequently created Baron Charlemont in 1837.

== Personal life ==
In 1768, Charlemont married Mary Hickman, daughter of Thomas Hickman of Brickhill, County Clare. The marriage is said to have been a very happy one. They had two sons, James and Henry.

His half-sister, Elizabeth Adderley (born 23 May 1743), was the mother of Major-General Robert Ross.

The somewhat inaccurate Memoirs of the Political and Private Life of James Caulfield, Earl of Charlemont, Knight of St. Patrick, by Francis Hardy, appeared in 1810.

Peerage of Ireland
New creation	Earl of Charlemont; 1763–1799	Succeeded by Francis Caulfeild
Preceded by James Caulfeild	Viscount Charlemont; 1734–1799	Succeeded by Francis Caulfeild
