= Charles Moore, 2nd Viscount Moore of Drogheda =

Irish soldier

- Born: 1603; Kingdom of Ireland
- Died: 7 August 1643 (aged 39–40); Portlester, Meath, Ireland
- Cause of death: Killed in battle
- Occupations: Politician, soldier
- Predecessor: Garret Moore, 1st Viscount Moore
- Successor: Henry Moore, 1st Earl of Drogheda
- Spouse: Alice Loftus

Charles Moore, 2nd Viscount Moore of Drogheda (1603–1643) was an Irish aristocrat noted for his leadership of Irish Royalist forces in northern Leinster during the early stages of the Irish Confederate Wars.

== Background ==
He was the third but eldest surviving son of Garret Moore, 1st Viscount Moore, a landowner in County Louth with connections with many prominent old English families of The Pale. Moore was a Protestant, unlike many of his relatives who remained Catholic. Moore had helped broker the Treaty of Mellifont in 1603, which brought an end to Tyrone's Rebellion. When Garret died in 1627, his Viscountcy and estates including Mellifont Abbey passed to his eldest son Charles. Charles's mother was Mary Colley, daughter of Sir Henry Colley of Castle Carbury and Catherine Cusack: her brother, Henry Colley Jr., was the direct ancestor of the Duke of Wellington. Charles married Alice Loftus (died 1649), younger daughter of Adam Loftus, 1st Viscount Loftus and Sarah Bathow Meredith, by whom he had at least four surviving children, including Henry, Sarah and Mary. Sarah married William Caulfeild, 1st Viscount Charlemont; Mary married Hugh Montgomery, 1st Earl of Mount Alexander.

His adult life before 1641 was uneventful. He took his seat in the Irish House of Lords in the Parliament of 1634–5, and sat on at least one House committee. Otherwise, he lived quietly with his wife and children at Mellifont. His wife visited Court in 1639 to plead for her father, who was in deep political disgrace: it is unclear if her husband accompanied her.

== Irish Rebellion ==
Following the outbreak of the Irish Rebellion, Moore's house at Mellifont was captured on 21 November 1641 as a prelude to the rebels' Siege of Drogheda. Moore was one of the leaders of a relief force from Dublin that lifted the siege in March 1642. He and Sir Henry Tichborne then marched on Dundalk and took the town. Tichborne became Governor of Dundalk and Moore returned to Drogheda.

In 1643 Moore commanded troops from Dublin sent to resist an advance into Leinster by the Ulster Army of the Irish Confederates commanded by Owen Roe O'Neill. On 7 August Moore confronted O'Neill at the Battle of Portlester in County Meath. During the fighting, he was killed by an artillery shot, said by some accounts to have been personally aimed and fired by his opponent O'Neill. Following Moore's death, the Protestant forces retreated with his body. O'Neill was unable to follow up his success by advancing towards Dublin.

His unusual death was the inspiration for a similar scene in the 1645 play, Cola's Furie, or Lirenda's Misery by Henry Burkhead, printed in Kilkenny. Moore was succeeded by his son, Henry who was made Earl of Drogheda by Charles II following the Restoration.

His widow was arrested soon after his death on suspicion of involvement in a conspiracy to betray Drogheda to the Scots General Robert Monro, to prevent the Irish rebels from regaining control of the town; in this, she claimed to be following her husband's policy of denying the Irish victory. She was confined to Dublin Castle but soon released. She died in June 1649, reportedly of gangrene from a broken leg, three days following a fall from a horse brought on by the shock of seeing St. Peter's Church of Ireland, Drogheda, which held her husband's tomb, for the first time.

Peerage of Ireland
Preceded by Garret Moore	Viscount Moore; 1627–1643	Succeeded by Henry Moore
