= Castle Caulfield =

Ruined house in County Tyrone, Northern Ireland

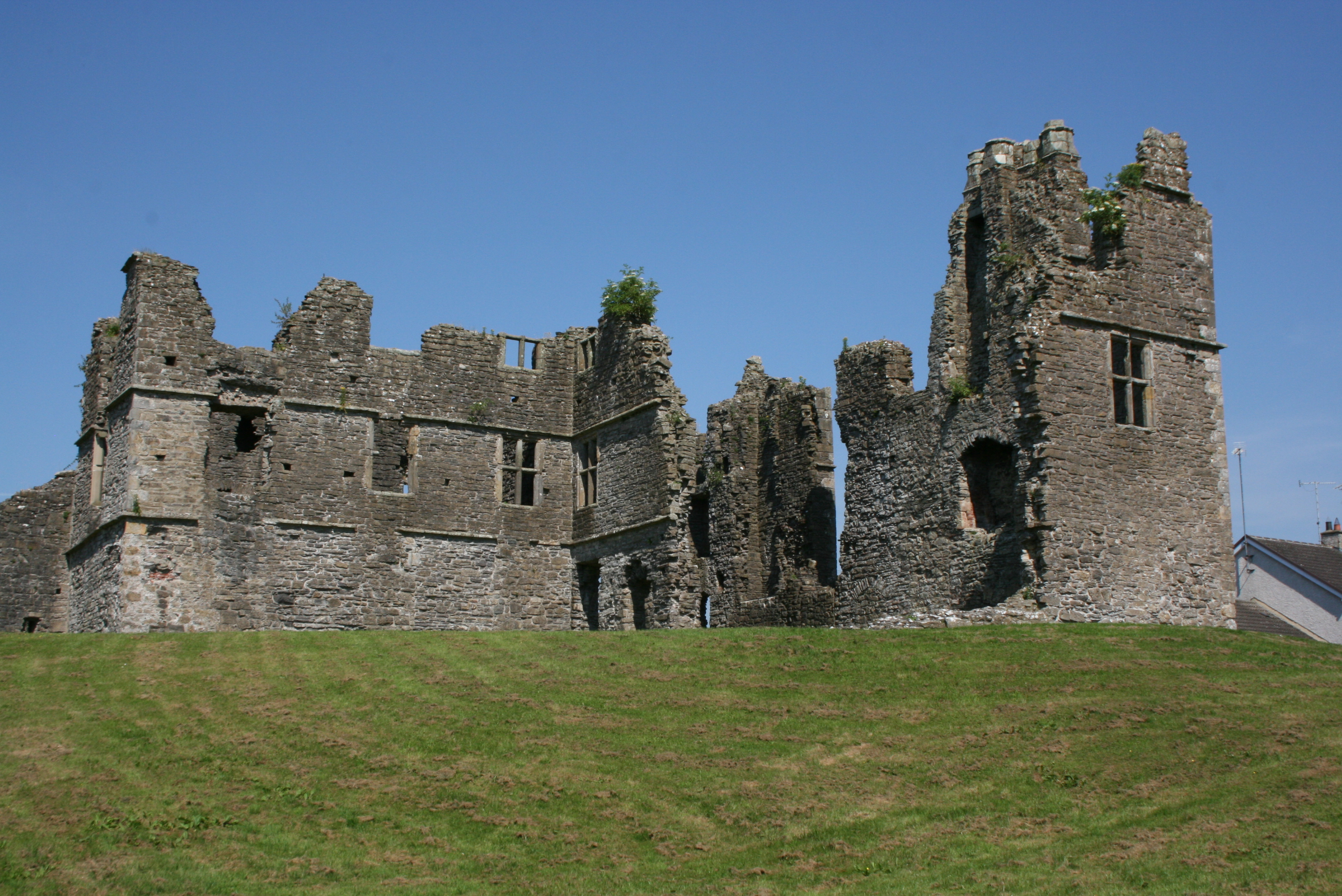
Castle Caulfield Ruins

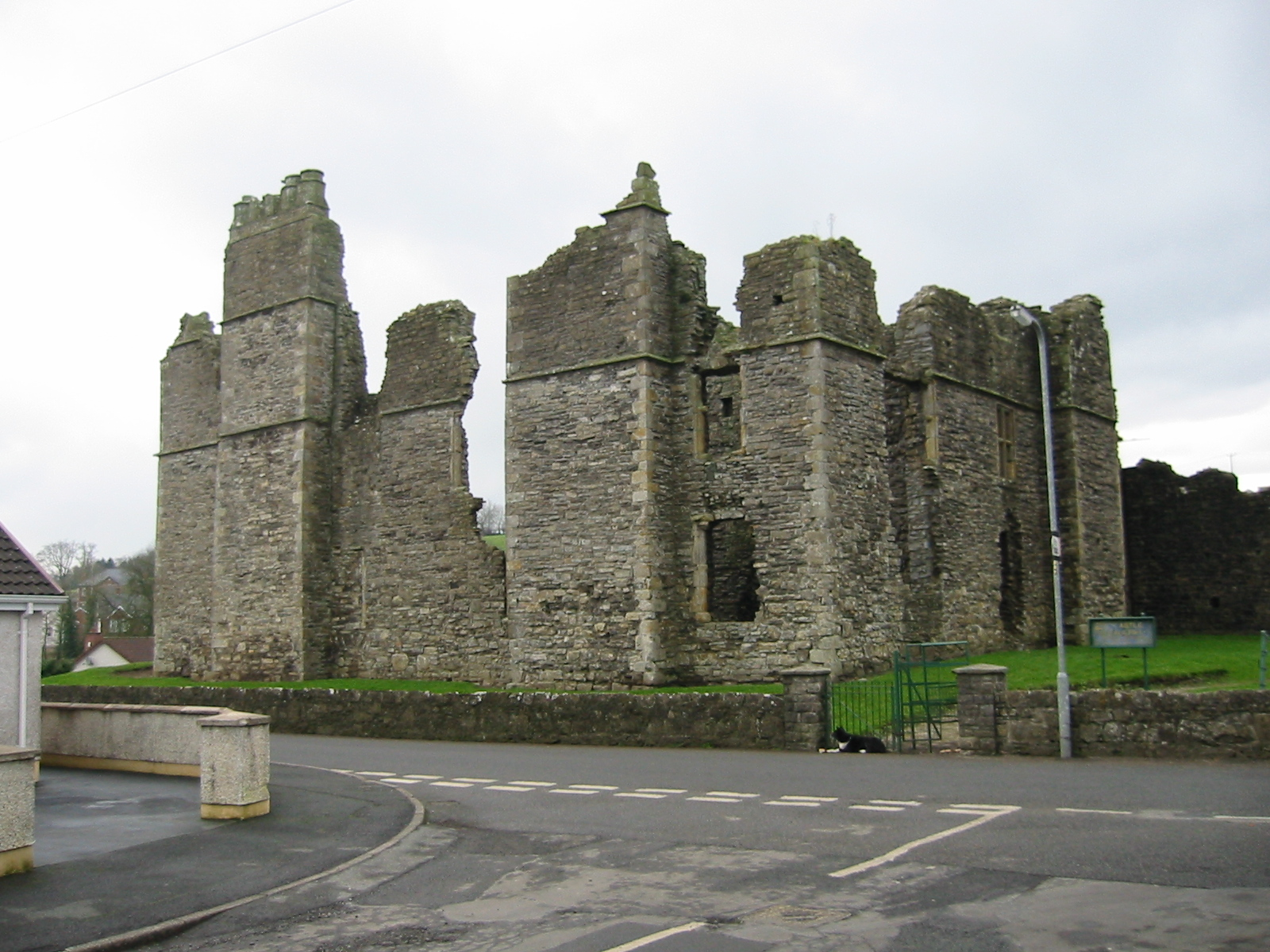
Castle Caulfield, Present Day

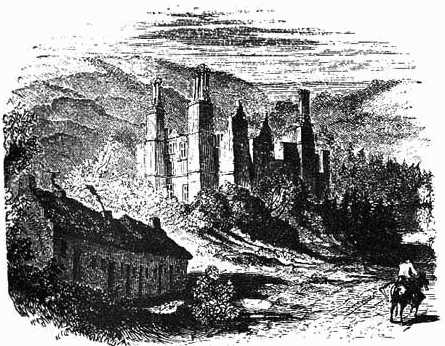
Castle Caulfield, 1868

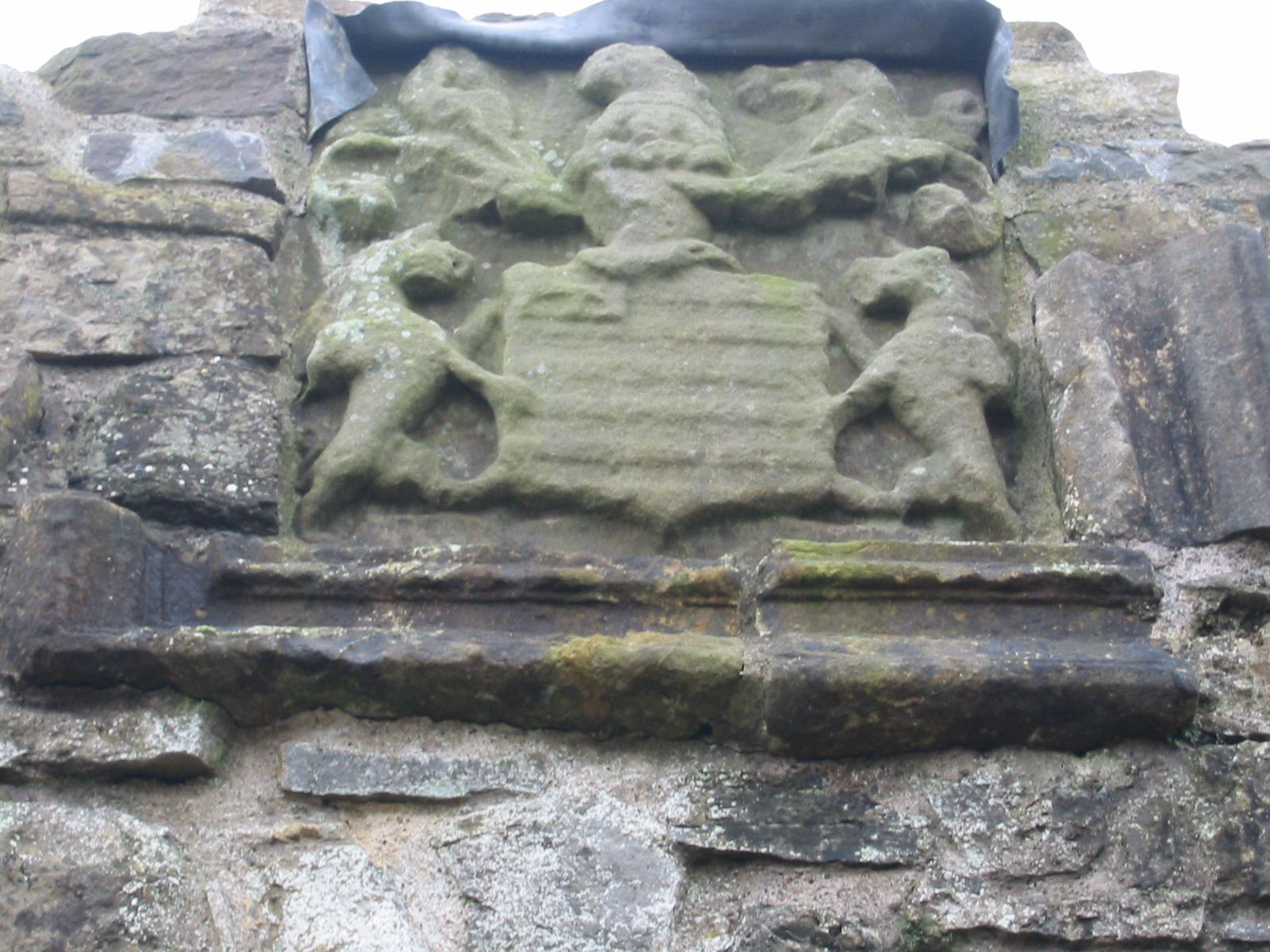
Caulfield Coat of Arms

Castle Caulfield is a large ruined house situated in Castlecaulfield, County Tyrone, Northern Ireland.

The house was built for Sir Toby Caulfield between 1611 and 1619. He was granted 1,000 acres at the start of the Plantation of Ulster. This land was previously owned by the O'Donnelly family, who were closely connected to the O'Neill clan in Dungannon. The O'Donnelly fort was a few miles west of the castle. There are substantial remains. The gatehouse was rebuilt at a later date, although one of the doorways may have been reused.

Castle Caulfield, today a ruin, is a State Care Historic Monument in the townland of Lisnamonaghan, in Dungannon and South Tyrone Borough Council area, at grid reference H7550 6260.

== See also ==
- Castles in Northern Ireland
