= William Caulfeild, 1st Viscount Charlemont =

Irish politician and peer (1624–1671)

William Caulfeild, 1st Viscount Charlemont PC (Ire) (1624 – April 1671), was an Irish politician and peer.

== Background ==
Born in Donamon Castle in County Roscommon, he was the third son of William, 2nd Baron Caulfeild, and his wife, Mary King, daughter of Sir John King and Catherine Drury. His two older brothers, Toby, 3rd Baron Caulfeild, and Robert, 4th Baron Caulfeild, both died without male issue and he succeeded to the barony on the latter's death in 1644.

== Career ==
Having been first a leading Parliamentarian under Oliver Cromwell, he captured Sir Phelim O'Neil in 1653 and executed him for rebellion and the murder of his brother Toby and his family. In 1660, the then Lord Caulfeild switched his allegiance and supported afterwards King Charles II of England, captaining a troop of horse. After the English Restoration, he took his seat in the Irish House of Lords and was sworn of the Privy Council of Ireland.

In 1661, the 5th Baron Caulfeild, as he was still known, was appointed Custos Rotulorum of County Armagh and Custos Rotulorum of County Tyrone, holding both offices until his death in 1671. He was rewarded with the governorship of Charlemont Fort for life in July of the same year; however, he sold this office back to the Crown three years later. On 8 October 1665, he was created Viscount Charlemont, in the County of Armagh.

== Family ==
In 1653, the then Lord Caulfeild married Hon. Sarah Moore, second daughter of the 2nd Viscount Moore of Drogheda and his wife, Alice Loftus, and had by her four sons and three daughters. She was the sister-in-law to Caulfeild's younger brother Thomas. Viscount Charlemont, as he had become, died in April 1671 and was buried at St Patrick's Cathedral in Armagh on 25 May. His wife survived him until 1712. He was succeeded in his titles by his second and oldest surviving son, William. A younger son, Toby, produced several notable descendants, including his grandson John, Archdeacon of Kilmore, and John's son, General James Caulfeild. His daughter Mary was the second wife of William, 6th Baron Blayney. His daughter Alicia was baptised at St Peter and St Kevin parish, Dublin, 16th December, 1691. married, firstly, John, son of Archbishop James Margetson and, secondly, the 1st Baron Carpenter. Lord Charlemont's youngest son John sat in the Parliament of Ireland.

== Memorial ==
There is a memorial on the west wall of the north transept of St Patrick's Cathedral, Armagh.

Honorary titles
Preceded by ?	Custos Rotulorum of Armagh; 1661–1671	Succeeded by ?
Preceded by ?	Custos Rotulorum of Tyrone; 1661–1671	Succeeded by ?
Peerage of Ireland
New creation	Viscount Charlemont; 1665–1671	Succeeded by William Caulfield
Preceded by Robert Caulfield	Baron Caulfeild; 1644–1671	Succeeded by William Caulfield
