= Edward Acheson (British Army officer) =

English cricketer and army officer (1844–1921)

Major-General The Honourable Edward Acheson
- Born: 22 May 1844; Worlingham, Suffolk, England
- Died: 3 July 1921 (aged 77); Westminster, London, England
- Military career
- Allegiance: United Kingdom
- Branch: British Army
- Service years: 1865–1887
- Rank: Major-General
- Unit: Coldstream Guards
- Conflicts: Anglo-Egyptian War; Battle of Tell El Kebir
- Awards: Egypt Medal; Khedive's Star

Major-General Edward Archibald Brabazon Acheson (22 May 1844 – 3 July 1921) was an English first-class cricketer and British Army officer.

The son of the Earl of Gosford, he was born at Worlingham Hall in Suffolk in May 1844. He was educated at Harrow School, where he played for the cricket team against Eton College. After completing his education at Harrow, Acheson decided on a career in the British Army, purchasing the commissions of ensign and lieutenant in May 1865. The following year he made a single appearance in first-class cricket for the Marylebone Cricket Club against Hampshire at Lord's. He batted just once in the match, being dismissed without scoring by Edward Hemsted. He was described by Wisden as "a good hitter, but wanting in defence; fielded well at long-leg and cover-point, his throwing-in being particularly good; rather wild as a bowler, but at times destructive".

In October 1867, Acheson purchased the ranks of lieutenant and captain. He was present as a dignitary at the installation of the Prince of Wales into the Order of St Patrick at Dublin Castle in May 1868. He married Clementina Le Marchant, a daughter of General Sir John Gaspard Le Marchant, in 1869, with the couple going on to have four children.

Acheson served in the Anglo-Egyptian War from July–September 1882, seeing action at the Battle of Tell El Kebir. For his participation in the conflict he was decorated with the Egypt Medal and the Khedive's Star. Shortly after the conclusion of the conflict, he was promoted to major without purchase. Acheson retired from active service in April 1887, at which point he was granted the honorary rank of major-general. Interests beyond his military career included his membership of the Travellers Club. Acheson died in Westminster in July 1921. His brother Archibald succeeded their father as the 4th Earl of Godsford.
