= Lurgan Town Hall =

Municipal Building in Lurgan, Northern Ireland

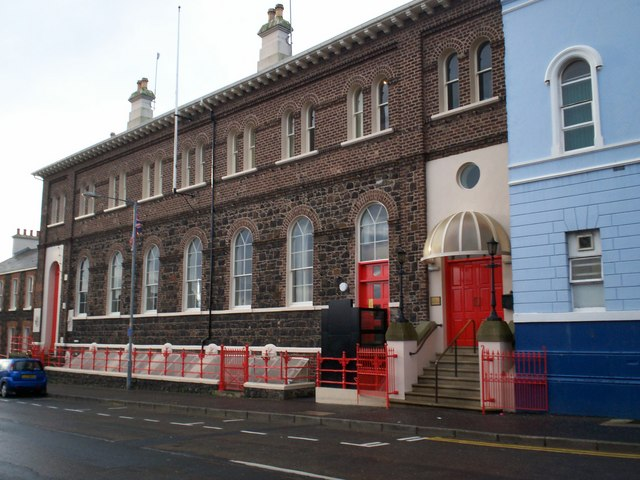
- Lurgan Town Hall

- Shown in Northern Ireland
- 54.4611°N 6.3315°W
- Location: Union Street, Lurgan

History
- Built: 1868

Site notes
- Architect: William Raffles Brown
- Architectural style: Italianate style

Listed Building – Grade B1
- Official name: Town Hall, Union Street, Lurgan, County Armagh
- Designated: 14 August 1981
- Reference no.: HB 14/23/030

Lurgan Town Hall is a municipal structure in Union Street, Lurgan, County Armagh, Northern Ireland. The structure, which is primarily used as a community, arts and resource centre, is a Grade B1 listed building.

== History ==
Following their election in 1855, the new town commissioners initiated various new buildings in the town, including a police barracks, a workhouse and a new courthouse as well as a new town hall; these developments were a direct challenge to the lord of the manor, the 2nd Lord Lurgan, who had stifled progress in the area for many years.

The new building was designed by William Raffles Brown in the Italianate style, built in rubble masonry and red brick at a cost of £2,300 and was completed in 1868. The design involved a broadly symmetrical main frontage with nine bays facing onto Union Street; the end bays, which were flanked by full-height pilasters, featured round headed doorways accessed by steps. The other bays on the ground floor were fenestrated by round-headed windows while the bays on the first floor were fenestrated by pairs of smaller round headed windows. At roof level there was a modillioned cornice which slightly projected out over the street. Internally, the principal room was the main hall with a seating capacity of around 250 people.

Internal alterations, involving part of the building being fitted out as a library, were carried out by a local contractor, W. J. Martin, and completed in August 1895. The area was advanced to the status of an urban district with the town hall as its headquarters in 1899, and, with significant financial support from the Scottish-American businessman, Andrew Carnegie, the library relocated to a purpose-built library facility in Carnegie Street in January 1906. In late 1962, an audience of 1,200 crammed into the main hall to hear a speech by the future First Minister, Ian Paisley, in which he denounced the New English Bible as a "perversion".

The building continued to serve as the meeting place of the urban district council for much of the 20th century, but ceased to be the local seat of government after the enlarged Craigavon Borough Council was formed in 1973. After the Ivy Lodge Police Barracks were badly damaged in a bomb attack in November 1973, parts of the town hall were temporarily made available to the Royal Ulster Constabulary. The building went on to become a community, arts and resource centre in 1985. In July 1997, a plaque commemorating the life of Rifleman William McFadzean of the Royal Irish Rifles, who was posthumously awarded the Victoria Cross for his actions at Thiepval Wood in March 1916 during the First World War, was unveiled outside the town hall.

Works of art in the town hall include a portrait by an unknown artist of the 3rd Lord Lurgan and a bronze bust by Jerome Connor of the Irish writer, George William Russell.
