= Charles Brownlow =

Charles Brownlow may refer to:

- Chas Brownlow (1861–1924), Australian rules football administrator in the Victorian Football League
- Charles Brownlow, 1st Baron Lurgan (1795–1847), Irish politician who sat in the House of Commons from 1818 to 1832
- Charles Brownlow, 2nd Baron Lurgan (1831–1882), Anglo-Irish Liberal politician
- Charles Henry Brownlow (1831–1916), British Army officer
- Charles Brownlow (The Bill), fictional character
