= Lurgan =

Town in County Armagh, Northern Ireland

Coordinates: 54.465°N 6.332°W

Lurgan: Irish: An Lorgain
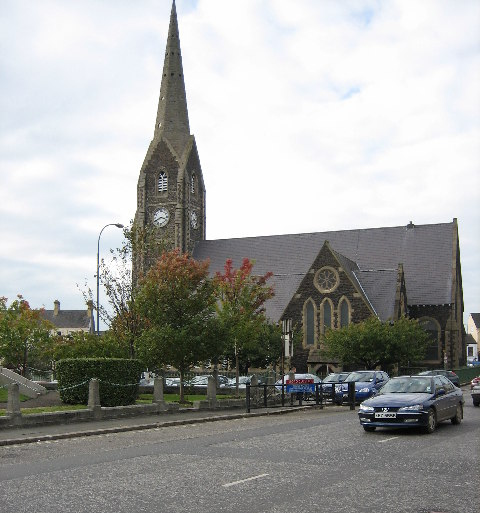
- Shankill Parish Church in Lurgan town centre

- Location within Northern Ireland
- Population: 28,631 (2021 estimate)
- Irish grid reference: J080585
  - Belfast: 18 miles (29 km)
- District: Armagh, Banbridge and Craigavon
- County: County Armagh
- Country: Northern Ireland
- Sovereign state: United Kingdom
- Post town: CRAIGAVON
- Postcode district: BT66, BT67
- Dialling code: 028
- Police: Northern Ireland
- Fire: Northern Ireland
- Ambulance: Northern Ireland
- UK Parliament: Upper Bann
- NI Assembly: Upper Bann

Lurgan (from Irish An Lorgain, meaning 'the long low ridge') is a town in the north of County Armagh, Northern Ireland, near the shore of Lough Neagh. It is about 18 miles (29 km) southwest of Belfast, and is linked to the Belfast–Dublin railway line and M1 motorway. Lurgan is in Armagh, Banbridge and Craigavon Borough and had a population of about 28,000 at the 2021 census. For certain purposes, Lurgan is treated as part of the "Craigavon Urban Area", along with neighbouring Craigavon and Portadown.

Lurgan is typical of many Plantation of Ulster settlements, with its straight and wide, planned streets, and is the home of a number of historic listed buildings, such as Brownlow House and Lurgan Town Hall. Lurgan Park is the largest urban park in Northern Ireland.

Historically, and after the Industrial Revolution, the town of Lurgan was known as a major centre for the production of textiles (mainly linen), something which continued steadily until that industry's gradual decline in the late 20th century. The development of Craigavon, the "new" city, had a major impact on Lurgan in the 1960s, at a time when much industry was attracted to the area.

== History ==
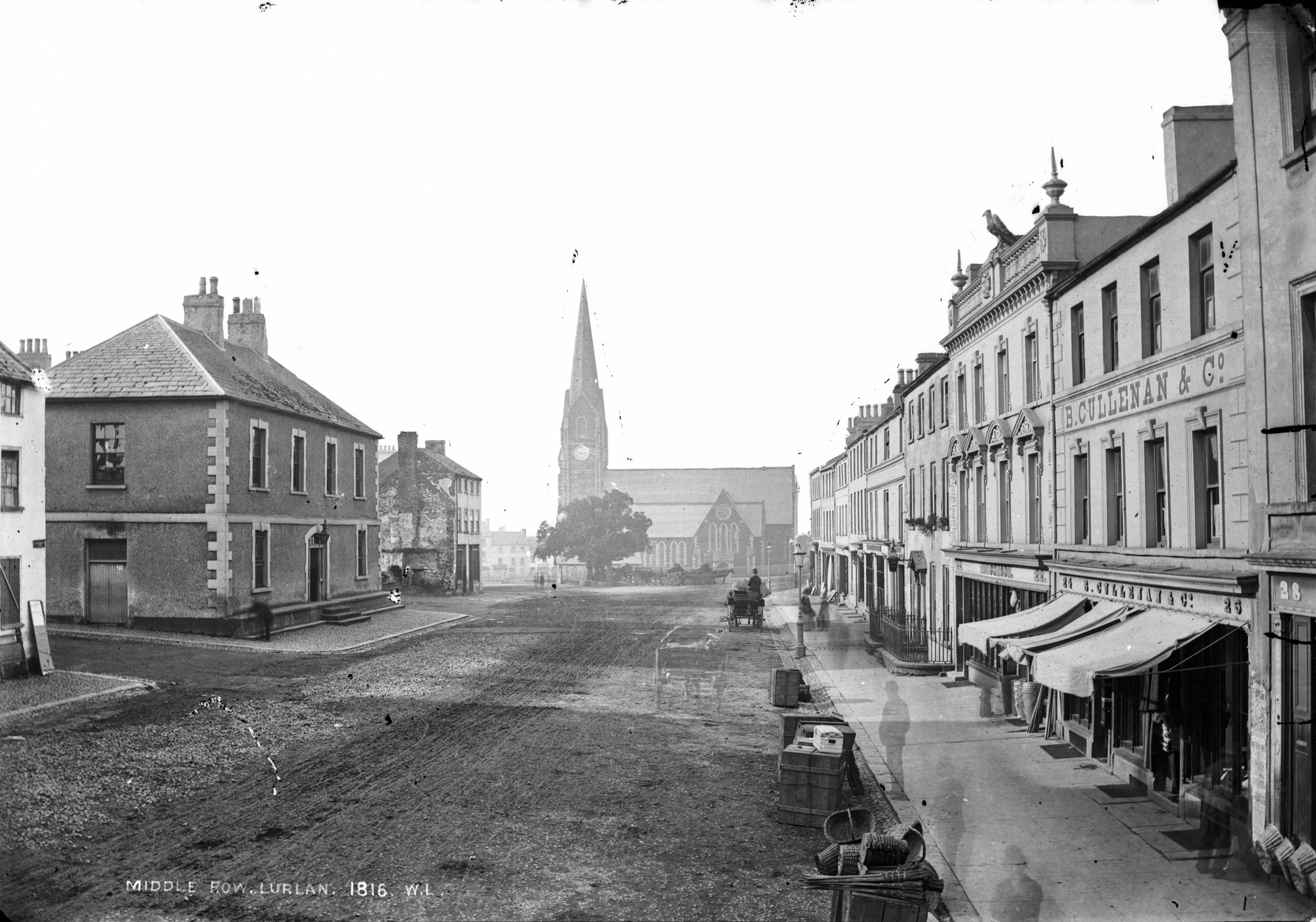
Middle Row, Lurgan, in the late 19th century

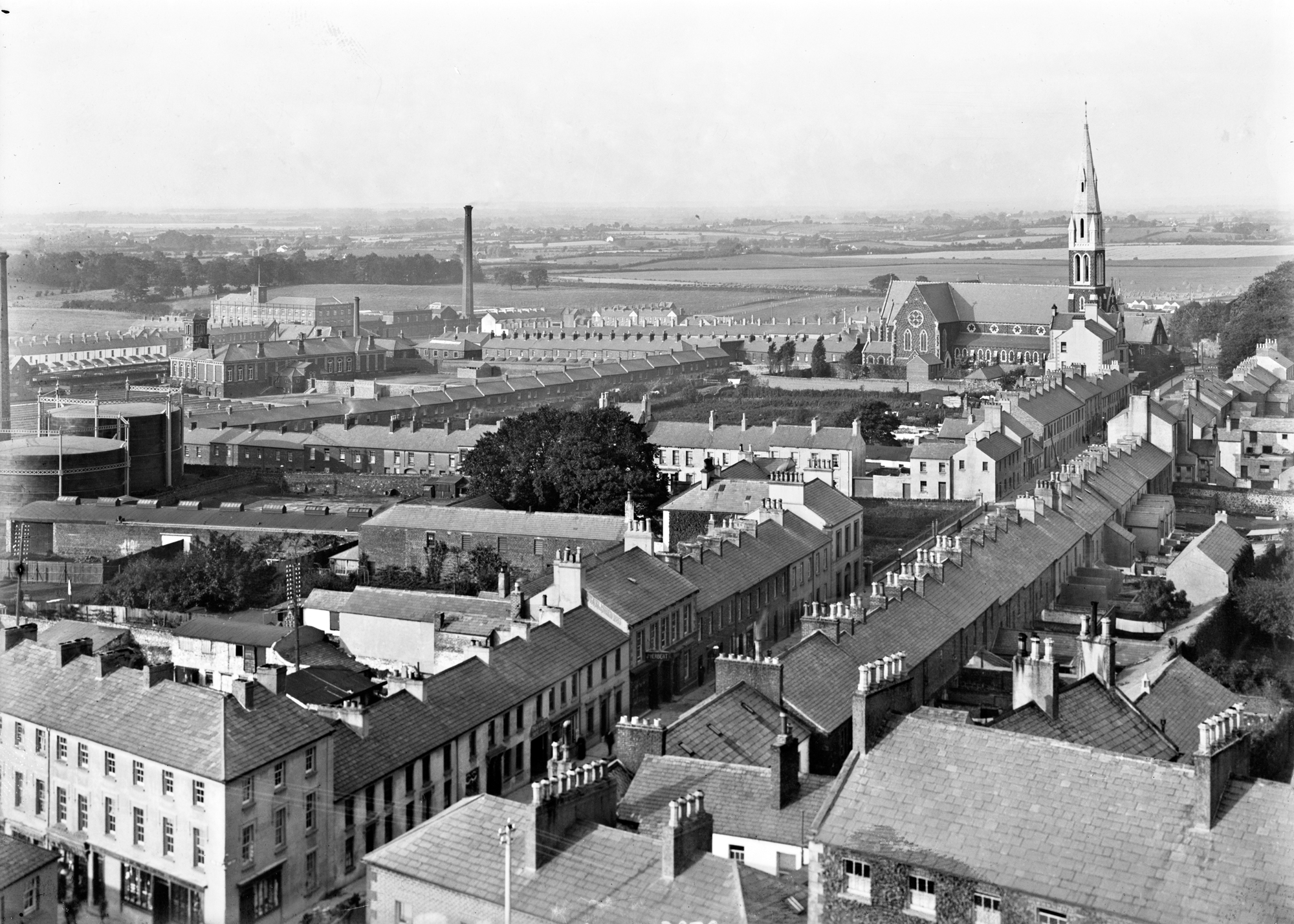
Birds-eye view of Lurgan in the early 20th century

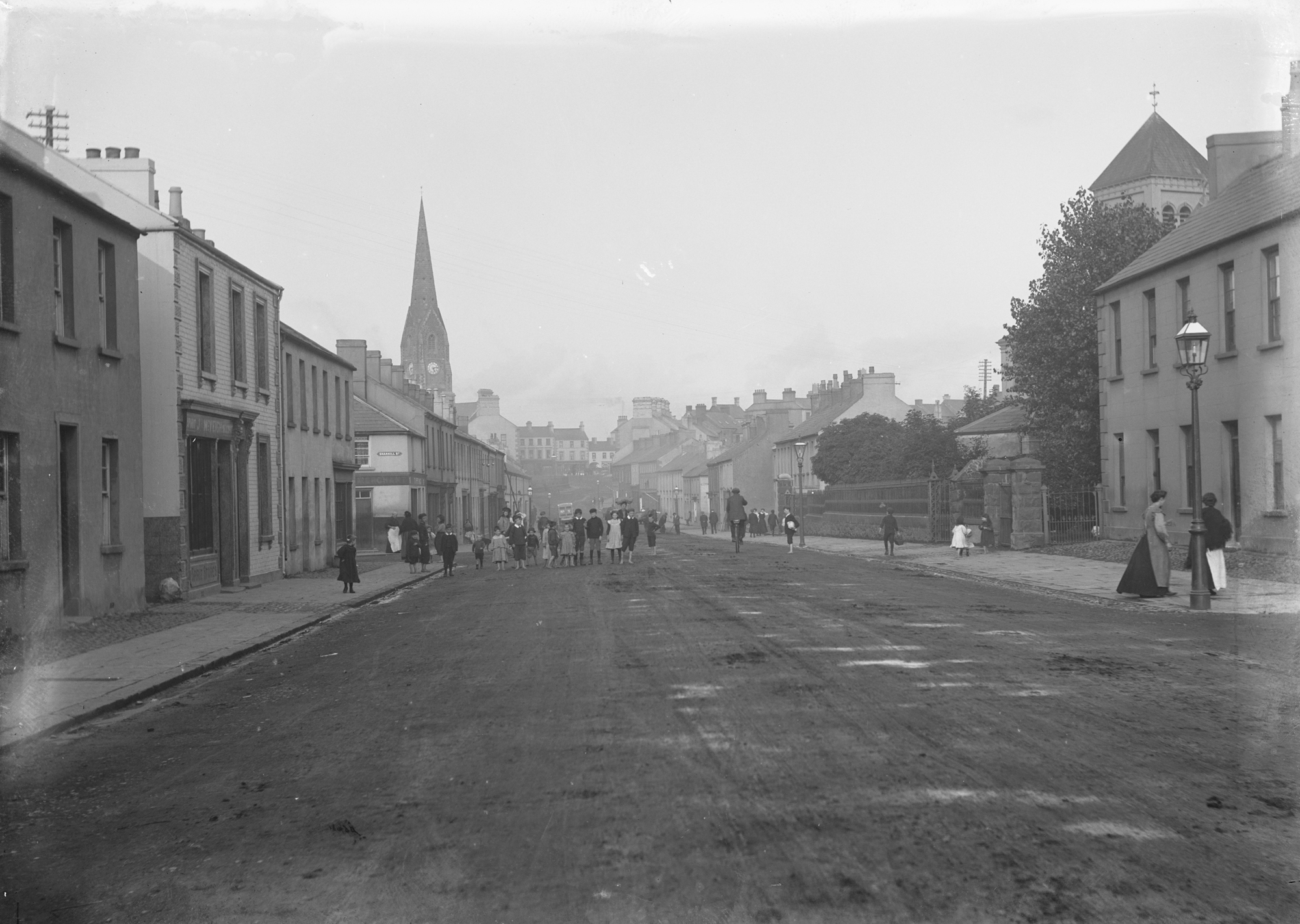
Edward Street, Lurgan, in the early 20th century

The name 'Lurgan' is an anglicisation of the Irish name An Lorgain, literally meaning "the shin", but in the context of placenames refers to a "shin"-shaped hill or ridge (i.e., long, low and narrow). Previous names of Lurgan included Lorgain Chlann Bhreasail (anglicised 'Lurganclanbrassil', "the long low ridge of Clanbrassil") and Lorgain Bhaile Mhic Cana (anglicised 'Lurganvallivackan', meaning "the long low ridge of McCann's settlement"). The McCanns (Mac Cana) were a sept of the O'Neills and lords of Clanbrassil until the early 17th century.

=== Origins and early history ===
The Lurgan area had long been sparsely populated by Catholic Irish Gaels. It was within the Gaelic territory of Clanbrassil and the Catholic parish of Shankill (from Irish Seancoill 'old wood' or Seanchill, 'old church'). This parish was historically called Killmilchon, from Irish Cill Mhíolcan 'Mílchú's church'. It was later anglicised Kilwilkie. In the Middle Ages, a church was built at what is now Shankill Graveyard, on the site of an earlier double ringfort. A 1609 map shows a roofless church on the site, possibly due to the upheaval of the Nine Years' War.

In 1610, during the Plantation of Ulster, the land was confiscated from the McCanns by the Crown, and granted to Protestant Englishman John Brownlow of Nottinghamshire and his son William. Initially, William settled at nearby Annaloist, beside Lough Neagh. By 1619, Pynnar's Survey reported that William had inherited his father's share and built a 'castle' (fortified house and bawn) at 'Dowcoran', along with a "fair Town, consisting of 42 Houses, all of which are inhabited with English Families", two watermills and a windmill. Brownlow married Eleanor of the O'Dohertys of Inishowen. He became MP for Armagh in the Irish Parliament in 1639. It is believed that the Brownlows repaired and re-used the old church at Shankill.

During the Irish Rebellion of 1641, around 1 November that year, Lurgan was seized by Irish Confederate rebels, allegedly led by Toole McRory McCann and Art Oge McGennis. Several English settlers were killed in the attack. William Brownlow agreed to surrender his castle to the rebels and was taken as prisoner to Dungannon. In 1642, Brownlow and his family were released by English forces under Lord Conway. After the rebellion and the ensuing war, the Brownlow family returned to their estate in Lurgan. William Brownlow died in 1660.

The Brownlow estate was inherited by William's grandson, Arthur Chamberlain Brownlow, who played a key role in the recovery and growth of Lurgan. He laid the foundations of the town's linen industry; in 1682, Lurgan was described as the biggest linen manufacturer in the north of Ireland and in 1708 as having the north's greatest linen market. Arthur Brownlow spoke both English and Irish, and helped to preserve medieval Irish manuscripts such as the Book of Armagh, which he kept in a collection at his Lurgan estate.

In 1725, a new Anglican church was built in the centre of Lurgan, becoming the new Shankill parish church. The old Shankill church was demolished in 1734, though the graveyard continued to be used for burials, including by the Brownlow family.

Irish republican leader Theobald Wolfe Tone often passed through Lurgan on his journeys, writing in 1792, "Lurgan green as usual".

=== Great Famine ===
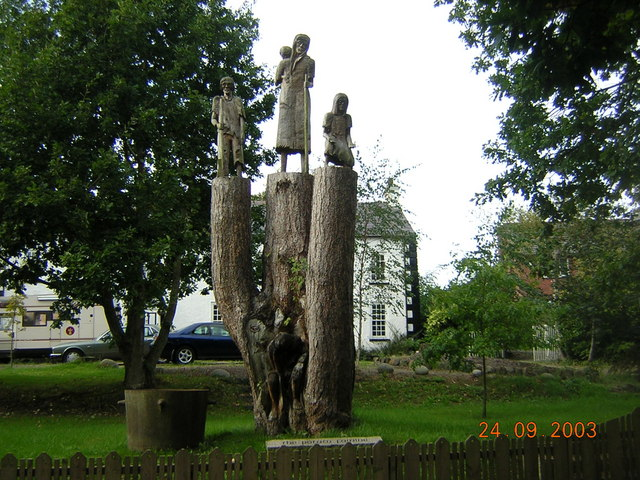
Famine memorial at Tannaghmore Gardens, outside Lurgan

A workhouse was built in Lurgan, opening in 1841 under the stipulations of the Poor Law, which stated that each Poor Law Union would build a workhouse to give relief to the increasing numbers of destitute poor. In 1821, Lurgan's population was 2,715; this increased to 4,677 within 20 years, by 1841. There were a number of reasons for this sudden surge in population; the opportunities provided by the booming linen industry of the day led many workers to abandon their likely-meagre living (in rural areas), relocating to Lurgan with the hopes of gaining employment. Furthermore, the ever-expanding town gave tradesmen the opportunity to secure work in construction of new structures and building, such as Brownlow House.

Eventually, the excess numbers of poorer workers moving into town resulted in issues of over-crowding, poor sanitation and a very low general standard of living. When the potato crop failed for a second time in 1846, the subsequent famine in-turn led to a workhouse which had exceeded its 800-person capacity, by the end of that year. In an attempt to alleviate the problem, a relief committee was established in Lurgan, as was customary in other towns. The relief committee raised money by subscriptions from local landowners, gentry and members of the clergy, with the funds being matched from Dublin. With this setup, food was purchased and distributed to the ever-increasing numbers of starving people via soup kitchens. In an attempt to provide employment, and thereby give the destitute the means to buy their own food items, Lord Lurgan devised a scheme of land-drainage on his estate.

The so-called "famine roads" were not built in Lurgan in the same way as the rest of Ireland, although land owners also provided outdoor relief by employing labourers to lower hills or repair existing road issues. During the period between 1846–1849, the famine claimed 2,933 lives in the Lurgan Union alone. The workhouse was situated on the grounds of what is now Lurgan Hospital, where a commemorative mural can be seen along the adjacent Tandragee Road.

=== New city ===
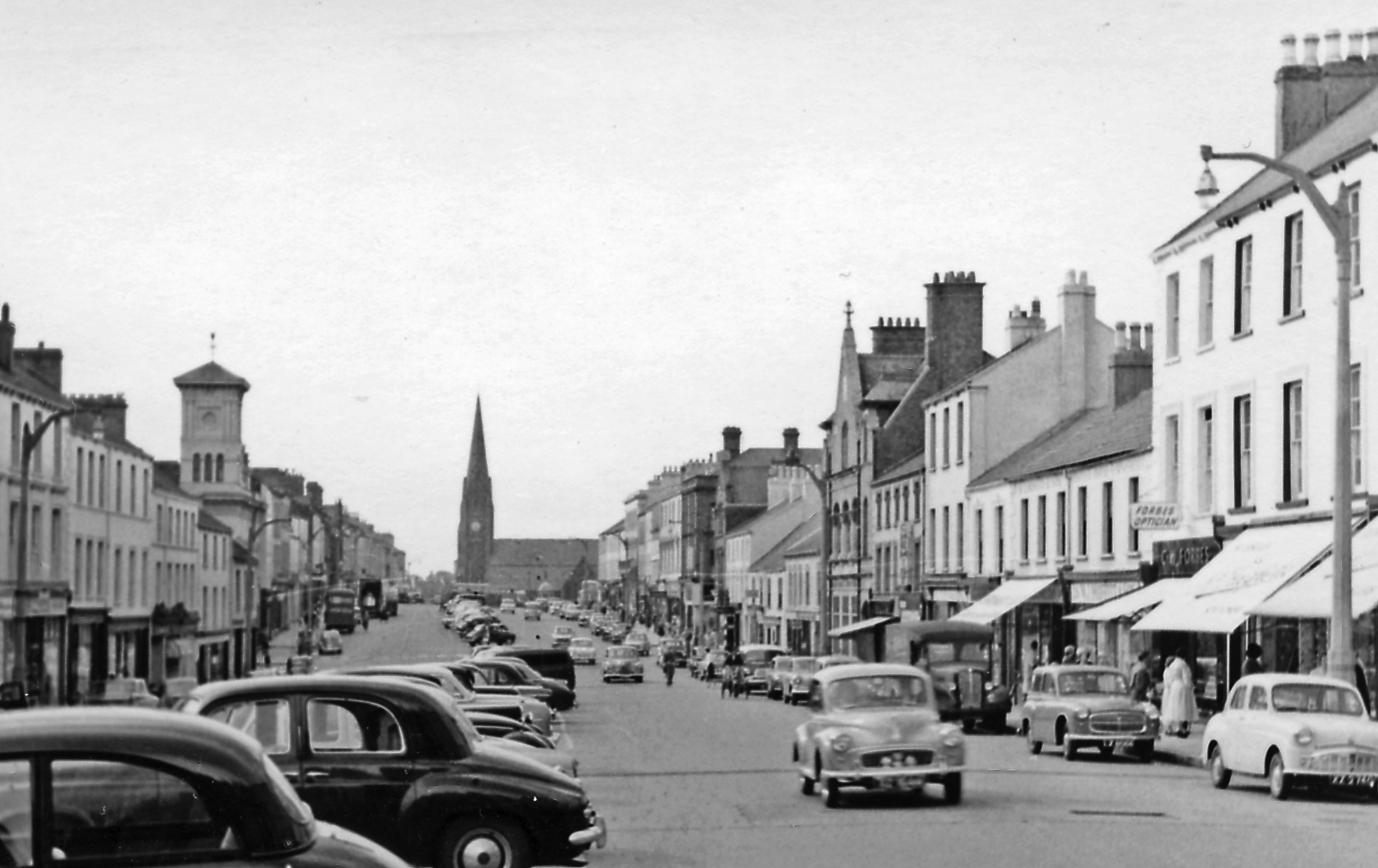
Lurgan's main street in 1960

The town of Lurgan grew steadily over the centuries as an industrial market town, and, in the 1960s—when the UK government was developing a programme of new towns in Great Britain, to deal with population growth—the Northern Irish government also planned a new town to deal with the projected urban growth of Belfast. This was also to prevent an undue case of overcrowding in the city. Craigavon (a name unpopular with the Nationalist community) was designated as a new town in 1965, intended to be a linear city incorporating the neighbouring towns of Lurgan and Portadown. The plan, largely, failed; today, 'Craigavon' locally refers to the rump of the residential area between the two towns. The Craigavon development, however, did affect Lurgan in a number of ways. The sort of dedicated bicycle and pedestrian paths that were built in Craigavon were also incorporated into newer housing areas in Lurgan, additional land in and around the town was zoned for industrial development, neighbouring rural settlements such as Aghacommon and Aghagallon were developed as housing areas, and there was an increase in the town's population, although not on the scale that had been forecast.

The textile industry remained a main employer in the town until the late twentieth century, with the advent of access to cheaper labour in the developing world leading to a decline in the manufacture of clothing in Lurgan.

=== The Troubles ===
Lurgan and the associated towns of Portadown and Craigavon made up part of what was known as the "murder triangle"; an area known for a significant number of incidents and fatalities during The Troubles. By 2010 the town was one of the few areas in Northern Ireland where so-called dissident republicans have a significant level of support. The legacy of the Troubles is continued tension between Roman Catholics and Protestants, which has occasionally erupted into violence at flashpoint 'interface areas'.

On 5 March 1992, a 1,000 lb truck bomb, believed to have been planted by the IRA, exploded in Market Street causing mass damage to commercial properties.

On 5 February 2020, the PSNI found a bomb on a lorry. The Continuity Irish Republican Army admitted they had planted it. They expected the lorry to be put on a North Channel ferry in January 2020.

== Geography ==
Lurgan sits in the north-eastern corner of County Armagh in a relatively flat part of Ireland by the south east shore of Lough Neagh, on the border with County Down and less than 2 miles from the border of County Antrim.

The earliest human settlements in the area were to the northwest of the present day town, near the shore of the lough. The oldest part of the town, the main street, is built on a long ridge in the townland of Lurgan. A neighbouring hill is the site of Brownlow House, which overlooks Lurgan Park.

=== Townlands ===
Like the rest of Ireland, the Lurgan area has long been divided into townlands, whose names mostly come from the Irish language. Lurgan sprang up in the townland of the same name. Over time, the surrounding townlands have been built upon and they have given their names to many roads and housing estates. The following is a list of townlands within Lurgan's urban area, alongside their likely etymologies:

Shankill parish:

- Aghnacloy (from Irish Achadh na Cloiche 'field of the stone')
- Ballyblagh (from Baile Bláthach, "flowery townland")
- Cornakinnegar (from Corr na gCoinigéar, "round hill of the rabbit warrens")
- Demesne (an English name – this townland was carved out of Drumnamoe and others, and includes Lurgan Park)
- Derry (from Doire, "oak grove")
- Dougher (formerly Doucharron and Doucorran, probably from An Dubhcharn, Dúcharn meaning "the black cairn")
- Drumnamoe (from Druim na mBó, "ridge of the cows")
- Knocknashane (formerly Knocknasogan, possibly from Cnoc na Seangán, "hill of the ants")
- Lurgantarry (from Lurgain an tSamhraidh meaning "summer ridge" or "ridge of the summer grazing")
- Shankill (from Seanchoill meaning "old wood", later understood as Seanchill, "old church")
- Taghnevan (from Teach Neamhain meaning "Neamhan's house" or "Neamhan's church")
- Tannaghmore North & Tannaghmore South (from an Tamhnach Mór, "the big grassy field")
- Toberhewny (from Tobar Shuibhne meaning "Sweeney's well" or Tobar Chainnigh meaning "Cainneach's well")
- Tirsogue (from Tír Sídheóg, "land of the fairies")

Seagoe parish:

- Ballynamony (from Baile na Mónadh, "townland of the bog")
- Drumnakelly (from Dromainn Uí Cheallaigh, "O'Kelly's ridge")
- Knockramer (from An Cnoc Ramhar, "the thick hill")
- Silverwood (an English translation – formerly called Killinargit, from Coill an Airgid meaning "wood of the silver")
- Turmoyra (from Tír Maighre, "land of the salmon")

=== Climate ===
Lurgan has a temperate climate in common with inland areas in Ireland. Summer temperatures can reach the 20s °C and it is rare for them to go higher than 30 °C (86 °F). The consistently humid climate that prevails over Ireland can make temperatures feel uncomfortable when they stray into the high 20s °C (80–85 °F), more so than similar temperatures in hotter climates in the rest of Europe.

Climate data for Lurgan
Month	Jan	Feb	Mar	Apr	May	Jun	Jul	Aug	Sep	Oct	Nov	Dec	Year
Mean daily maximum °C (°F)	7 (45)	8 (46)	10 (50)	12 (54)	15 (59)	17 (63)	19 (66)	19 (66)	16 (61)	13 (55)	10 (50)	7 (45)	13 (55)
Mean daily minimum °C (°F)	2 (36)	2 (36)	3 (37)	4 (39)	6 (43)	9 (48)	11 (52)	10 (50)	9 (48)	7 (45)	4 (39)	3 (37)	6 (43)
Average precipitation cm (inches)	5.6 (2.2)	4.67 (1.84)	4.46 (1.76)	4.62 (1.82)	4.22 (1.66)	4.38 (1.72)	4.49 (1.77)	4.84 (1.91)	4.58 (1.80)	6.79 (2.67)	5.94 (2.34)	5.61 (2.21)	60.2 (23.7)
Source: MSN.com

== Demography ==
Historical population
Year	Pop.	±%
1821	2,715	—
1831	2,842	+4.7%
1841	4,677	+64.6%
1851	4,205	−10.1%
1861	7,772	+84.8%
1871	10,632	+36.8%
1881	10,135	−4.7%
1891	11,429	+12.8%
1901	11,782	+3.1%
1911	12,553	+6.5%
1926	12,500	−0.4%
1937	13,766	+10.1%
1951	16,183	+17.6%
1961	17,872	+10.4%
1966	20,673	+15.7%
1971	25,431	+23.0%
1981	20,991	−17.5%
1991	21,905	+4.4%
2001	23,534	+7.4%
2011	25,069	+6.5%
2021	28,631	+14.2%

For census purposes, Lurgan is not treated as a separate settlement by the Northern Ireland Statistics and Research Agency (NISRA), but is combined with Craigavon, Portadown and Aghacommon as the "Craigavon Urban Area". Within this, the town roughly corresponds to the Lurgan sector.

On the day of the last census (21 March 2021), the Lurgan sector had a population of 28,631. Of this population:

- 64.6% were Catholic or raised Catholic, 26.4% were Protestant or raised Protestant, 1.3% belonged to other religions, and 7.8% had no religion.
- 96.3% were White, and 3.7% were of other ethnicities.
- 84.3% were born in Northern Ireland, and 15.7% were born in other countries
- 90.4% spoke English as their main language, with the second most spoken being Polish (3.8%).

The town is residentially segregated along sectarian lines, with some housing areas being almost exclusively Catholic/Irish nationalist or almost exclusively Protestant/British unionist. The northwest end of the town centre is considered Catholic/nationalist, the southeast end is considered Protestant/unionist, with the "invisible dividing line" starting at the end of Market Street and the beginning of High Street at Windsor Avenue and Union Street. In the 1980s there were two Protestant enclaves in the north end of the town, Gilpinstown and Wakehurst. They have both since changed to become Catholic areas.

There was a Synagogue at 49 North Street for the Lurgan Hebrew Congregation, founded around 1903 by Joseph Herbert (originally Herzberg) from Tukums in Latvia, but this closed in around 1926 the time of the founder's death.

The first meeting of the Religious Society of Friends (Quakers) in Ireland was held in Lurgan in 1654, at the home of William Edmundson.

== Governance ==
Lurgan is part of the Upper Bann constituency for the purpose of elections to the UK Parliament at Westminster. This has long been a safe unionist seat and the current MP is the independent Carla Lockhart

Members of the Northern Ireland Assembly at Stormont are elected from five-member constituencies using proportional representation and using the same constituencies as for Westminster.

Lurgan town commissioners were first elected in 1855, and they were replaced by Lurgan Urban District Council following the Local Government (Ireland) Act 1898. This effectively ended landlord control of local government in Ireland. The town council was abolished when local government was reformed in Northern Ireland in 1973 under the Local Government (Boundaries) Act (Northern Ireland) 1971 and the Local Government Act (Northern Ireland) 1972. These abolished the two-tier system of town and county councils replacing it with the single-tier system. Lurgan was placed under the jurisdiction of Craigavon Borough Council, and remained so until a new act streamlined and merged the various districts in 2015. Today Lurgan forms part of Armagh, Banbridge and Craigavon District. The Lurgan area contains the following wards: Aghagallon, Knocknashane, Lough Road, Magheralin, Mourneview, Parklake, and Shankill.

Seven councillors are elected to represent the Lurgan electoral area on Armagh City, Banbridge and Craigavon Borough Council. The councillors for the DEA elected in 2023 are:

2023-27 council members
District electoral area	Name	Party
Lurgan	Keith Haughian	Sinn Féin
Lurgan	Peter Haire	DUP
Lurgan	Liam Mackle	Sinn Féin
Lurgan	Mary O'Dowd	Sinn Féin
Lurgan	Peter Lavery	Alliance
Lurgan	Stephen Moutray	DUP
Lurgan	Sorchá McGeown	Sinn Féin

== Economy ==
Lurgan has historically been an industrial town in which the linen industry predominated as a source of employment during the Industrial Revolution, and is said to have employed as many as 18,000 handloom weavers at the end of the 19th century, a figure significantly higher than the town's resident population at the time. That particular branch of the textile industry declined as consumer tastes changed, but other textiles continued to be produced in the town providing a major source of employment until the 1990s and 2000s when the textile industry across the UK suffered a major decline as a result of outsourcing to low wage countries.

The large Goodyear fan-belt factory at Silverwood Industrial Estate was a product of the Craigavon development when large tracts of land in Lurgan, Portadown, and areas in between were zoned off for exclusive industrial use. The Goodyear factory closed in 1983 after failing to make a profit, resulting in the loss of 750 jobs. The facility was later partly occupied by Wilson Double Deck Trailers and DDL Electronics. Silverwood Industrial Estate continues to host other manufacturing and light engineering firms. Other industrial areas in the town are Annesborough and Halfpenny Valley (Portadown Road) industrial estates; areas in which growth has been limited compared to other industrial estates in the Craigavon Borough.

A key component of the Craigavon development was a central business district halfway between Lurgan and Portadown that would serve as the city centre for the whole of the new city. What was built was an office building, a court house, a civic building, and a small shopping centre alongside several acres of parkland that were developed around the newly created balancing lakes that also serve as part of the area's drainage system. In the 1990s, the shopping centre was significantly expanded to form what is now Rushmere Retail Park, containing many major retail stores. This has had a detrimental effect on the retail trade in Lurgan in the same way that out-of-town shopping developments in other parts of Northern Ireland have damaged other traditional town centres. The town's Chamber of Commerce is not functioning and has remained dormant despite numerous attempts to revive it.

== Culture and community ==
=== Cultural references ===
There is a figure of speech used in Ireland – to have a face as long as a Lurgan spade – meaning "to look miserable". The origins of this expression are disputed. One theory is that a "Lurgan spade" was an under-paid workman digging what is now the Lurgan Park lake. Another theory is that it could be from the Irish language lorga spád meaning the shaft (literally "shin") of a spade.

The ballad Master McGrath concerns a greyhound of that name from Lurgan which became an Irish sporting hero. The dog was bought in Lurgan by the Brownlow family, and the song also mentions his owner Charles Brownlow, referred to in the lyrics as Lord Lurgan. Master McGrath won the Waterloo Cup hare coursing competition three times in 1868, 1870 and 1871 at a time when this was a high-profile sport. A post mortem found that he had a heart twice the size of what is normal for a dog of his size. He is remembered all over the town, including in its coat of arms. The dog was named McGrath after the kennel boy responsible for its care. A statue of him was unveiled at Craigavon Civic Centre in 1993, over 120 years after his last glory in 1871. The statue was relocated to Lurgan town centre in 2013. A festival is also held yearly in his honour. A Lurgan pub is also named after Master McGrath.

Shankill Graveyard in Lurgan is associated with the legend of Margorie McCall, who was mistakenly buried in 1695 after contracting a fever. According to the story, grave robbers trying to steal a ring from her hand attempted to cut off her finger, only to discover she was still alive when she suddenly awoke. Her headstone in the cemetery reads, "Lived once, buried twice." This account is often cited as an Irish example of the widespread European folklore motif known as the “Lady with the Ring” in which premature burial is revealed when would‑be thieves attempt to remove a valuable ring from the deceased, only for the person to revive.

The town is a frequent recipient of derision by the BBC Northern Ireland comedy panel show The Blame Game.

=== Community facilities ===
Oxford Island is a nature reserve on the shore of Lough Neagh that includes Kinnego Marina and the Lough Neagh Discovery Center, which is an interpretive visitor centre offering information about the surrounding wildlife, conference facilities, and a café.

Lurgan Park, a few hundred yards from the main street, is the largest urban park in Northern Ireland and the second-largest in Ireland after Phoenix Park, Dublin. It used to be part of the estate of Brownlow House, a 19th-century Elizabethan-style manor house. In 1893, the land was purchased by Lurgan Borough Council and opened as a public park in 1909 by Earl Aberdeen, Lord Lieutenant of Ireland. It includes a sizeable artificial lake and an original Coalbrookdale fountain. Today the park is home to annual summer events such as the Lurgan Agricultural Show, and the Lurgan Park Rally, noted as the largest annual motor sport event in Northern Ireland and a stage in the Circuit of Ireland rally. Mount Zion House in Edward St, formerly the St Joseph's Convent, is now a cross-community centre run by the Shankill Lurgan Community Association/Community Projects. It is funded by the Department for Social Development, the EU Special Programme for Peace and Reconciliation, and the Physical and Social Environment Programme.

== Landmarks ==
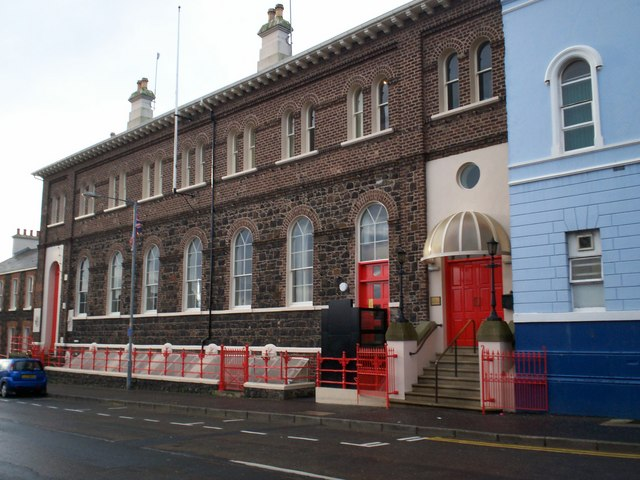
Lurgan Town Hall in Union Street, built in 1868.

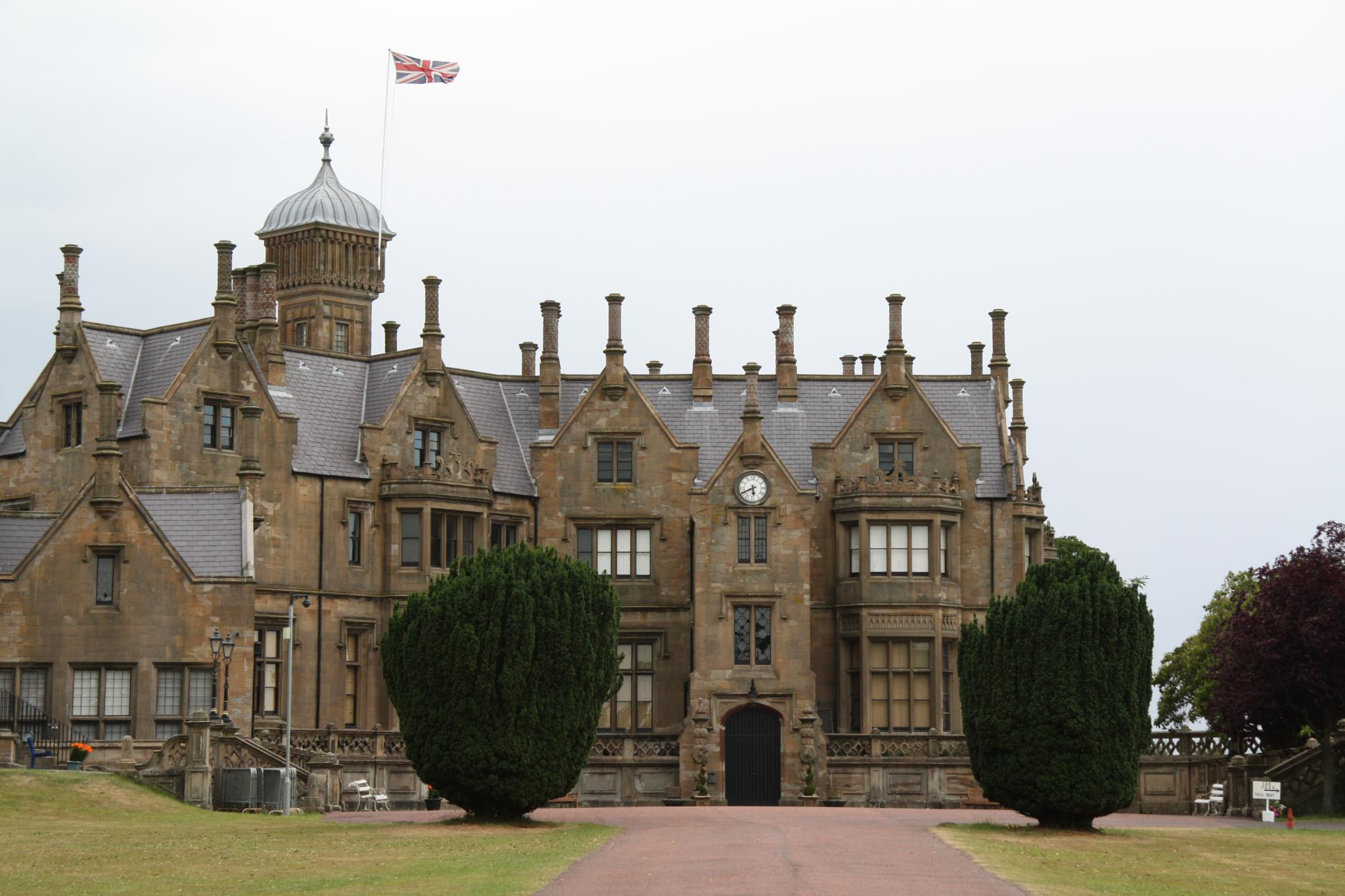
Brownlow House

Lurgan Park, formerly part of the Brownlows' estate, and now a public space.

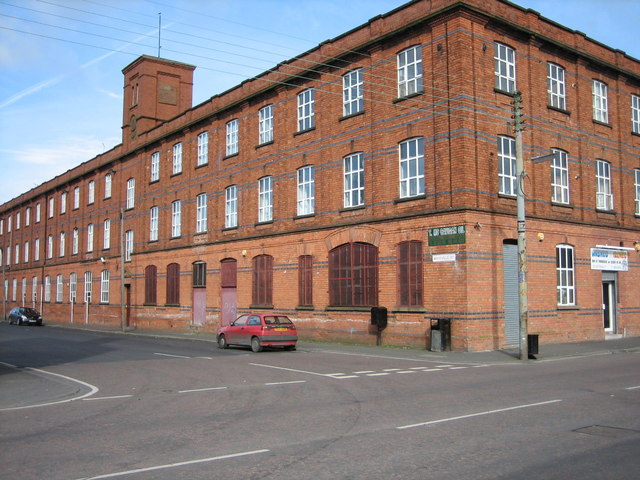
The former Johnson & Allen linen factory on Victoria Street, built in 1888 and now used as multiple small industrial and retail units

Lurgan town centre is distinctive for its wide main street, Market Street, one of the widest in Ireland, which is dominated at one end by Shankill (Anglican) Church in Church Place. A grey granite hexagonal temple-shaped war memorial sits at the entrance to Church Place, topped by a bronze-winged statue representing the spirit of Victorious Peace. A marble pillar at the centre displays the names of over 400 men from the town who lost their lives in the First World War.

The rows of buildings on either side of Market Street are punctuated periodically by large access gates that lead to the space behind the buildings, gates that are wide enough to drive a horse and cart through. The town's straight planned streets are a common feature in many Plantation towns, and its industrial history is still evident in the presence of many former linen mills that have since been modified for modern use.

At the junction of Market Street and Union Street is Lurgan Town Hall, a listed building erected in 1868. It was the first site of the town's library in 1895, was temporarily used as a police station from 1973 and is today available for conferences and community functions.

Brownlow House, known locally as 'Lurgan Castle', is a distinctive mansion built in 1833 with Scottish sandstone in an Elizabethan style with a lantern-shaped tower and prominent array of chimney pots. It was originally owned by the Brownlow family, and today is owned by the Lurgan Loyal Orange District Lodge. A former lodge to the Brownlow House estate became the Brownlow Arms Hotel on Market Street, run by the McCaffrey family, which served as the US 5th Army's Officers' Mess during WW2 but closed in the early 1960s. The adjacent Lurgan Park, now a public park owned by Craigavon Borough Council, used to be part of the same estate. The park is the venue for the Lurgan Park Rally.

=== Religious sites ===
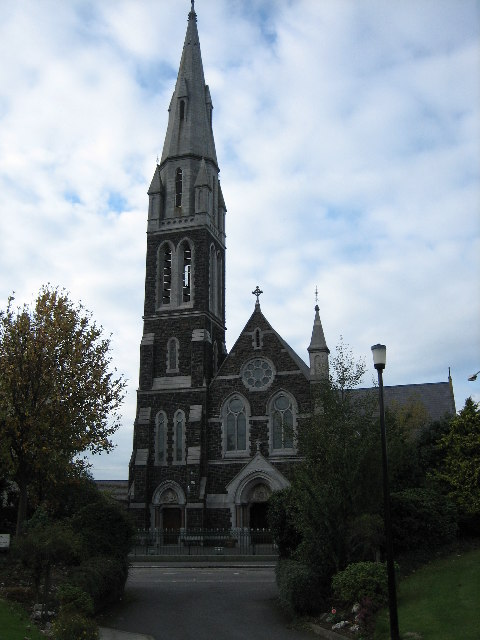
St Peter's Catholic Church, North St. built in 1832

The site of what is now Shankill cemetery served as a place of worship since the Middle Ages. Today it is a historic burial site holding the remains of people who lived in the earliest days of the town's existence, including the Brownlow family. Dougher cemetery is another old graveyard that was donated to the Catholic people by the Brownlows following passage of the Catholic Relief Act.

The two most prominent modern places of worship are Shankill Parish Church in Church Place and St Peter's Church in North Street, the steeples of which are visible from far outside the town.

Shankill Parish Church belongs to the Anglican Church of Ireland. The original Catholic parish church was on the site of what is now Shankill Graveyard. It fell into disrepair during the Tudor conquest of Ireland. Following the Plantation of Ulster and the takeover of the area by the English Brownlow family, the church was restored for use by the new English settlers. It was eventually found to be too small given the growth of the town, and the Irish Parliament granted permission to build a replacement in 1725 one mile away on the 'Green of Lurgan', now known as Church Place, where it stands to this day. It is believed to be the largest parish church in Ireland, and contains the only set of change ringing bells in County Armagh.

Following passage of the Catholic Relief Act, Charles Brownlow granted a site to the Roman Catholic parish priest the Reverend William O'Brien in 1829 for the construction of a church on Distillery Hill, now known as lower North Street. It was there that work began in 1832 on what is now St Peter's Church.

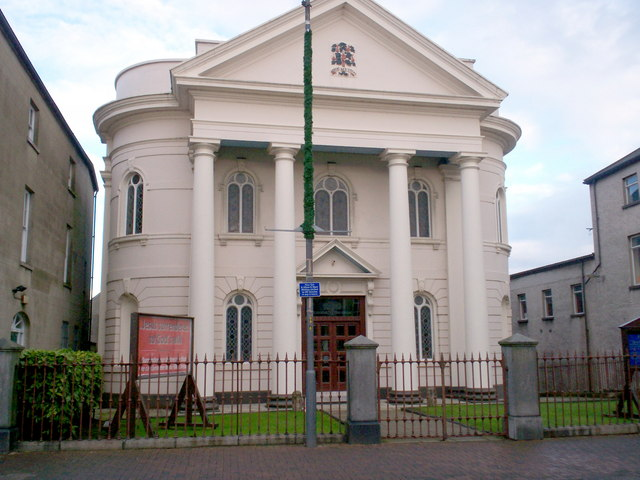
First Lurgan Presbyterian Church built in 1827–28

In 1966, another Catholic church, St Paul's, was built at the junction of Francis Street and Parkview Street. This was a radical departure from traditional church architecture with its grey plaster finish, copper roof, slim spire, hexagonal angles and modern design throughout. Many of its architectural features such as the copper roof and gray plaster finish are shared by the neighbouring St Paul's School. It was designed to cope with the extra demand for worship space following the growth of the surrounding Taghnevan and Shankill housing estates.

The first Methodist church was built in Nettleton's Court, Queen Street in 1778. It was found to be too small and a new church was built on High Street in 1802, and replaced by a newer building in front of it in 1826. This High Street Methodist Church was extensively renovated in 1910 and stands to this day sporting a simple facade.

== Education ==
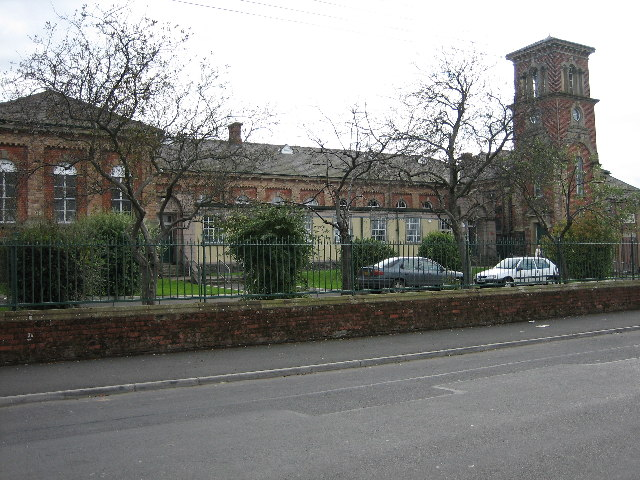
Lurgan Model Primary School

It was the late 19th century that saw the development of formal education in Lurgan and a significant move away from the less organised hedge schools of before.

Today, schools in Lurgan operate under the Dickson Plan, a transfer system in north Armagh that allows pupils at age 11 the option of taking the 11-plus exam to enter grammar schools, with pupils in comprehensive junior high schools being sorted into grammar and non-grammar streams. Pupils can get promoted to or demoted from the grammar stream during their time in those schools depending on the development of their academic performance, and at age 14 can take subject-based exams across the syllabus to qualify for entry into a dedicated grammar school to pursue GCSEs and A-levels.

Some schools are in the Catholic 'maintained' sector, i.e. maintained by the Council for Catholic Maintained Schools, and others are controlled directly by the state. Directly controlled state schools generally have a predominantly Protestant intake.

=== Primary education ===
- Lurgan Model Primary School (Controlled) – this school was part of the national schools programme proposed in 1831 in which each county in Ireland would have at least one school that would serve as an example to other national schools in the area and as a teacher training establishment (although teacher training did not take place at this particular school). Initially it had a multi-denominational intake, offered such services as night classes and industry-relevant vocational courses, and was enthusiastically supported by William Brownlow who is thought to have brought the school to the town. It was undermined, however, by church interests, which were opposed to its lack of ecclesiastical control, and criticism of the efficiency of its management, hence losing much of its earlier prestige as the premier educational establishment in the town. It is now co-educational, non-denominational and accepts pupils irrespective of race or religion.
- St. Francis' Primary School and Bunscoil Naomh Proinsias (Catholic Maintained)
- St Teresa's Primary School (Catholic Maintained)
- St Anthony's Primary School (Catholic Maintained)
- Tannaghmore Primary School (Catholic Maintained)
- Tullygally Primary School (Catholic Maintained)
- Carrick Primary School (Controlled)
- Dickson Primary School (Controlled)
- King's Park Primary School (Controlled)

=== Post-primary education ===
- Lurgan College – a co-ed 14–18 grammar school, was established in 1873 as an all-boys school to provide what was known as 'classical education' as opposed to the more practical vocational education on offer at the Model School. Its initial charter included a provision that "no person being in Holy Orders, or a minister of any religious denomination shall at any time interfere in the management of the said school, or be appointed to serve as master" and that no religious instruction was to take place during school hours.
- St Ronan's College – A co-ed secondary school for 11–18-year olds. It was formed from the merger of St Mary's Junior High School, St Paul's Junior High School, and St Michael's Grammar School. St Mary's Intermediate School was built on Kitchen Hill after land was acquired from the Sisters of Mercy in 1955 and was opened in 1959 as an all-girls school. The nearby all-boys St Paul's Intermediate School was opened in 1962.
- Lurgan Junior High School – A co-educational 11–14 High School.

A number of people from Lurgan also attend Lismore College and Brownlow Integrated College in Craigavon.

- Southern Regional College – Lurgan Technical College was renamed Lurgan College of Further Education, and subsequently merged with Portadown CFE and Banbridge CFE into the larger Upper Bann Institute of Further and Higher Education (UBIFHE). Further education in the region was consolidated further when this institution was merged with other FE colleges in Armagh, Newry and Kilkeel to form the Southern Regional College. It offers vocational courses as an alternative to A-Levels, and adult education services.

=== Special needs education ===
Ceara School provides education for pupils aged 3 through 19 who have severe learning difficulties.

== Sport and leisure ==
=== Facilities ===
Lurgan has two 18-hole golf courses, an artificial ski slope and an equestrian centre for show jumping.

=== GAA ===
Lurgan has a large GAA presence, with Gaelic football being played by clubs Clan na Gael CLG, Clann Éireann GAC, Éire Óg CLG, Sarsfields GAC (Derrytrasna), St Mary's GAC (Aghagallon), St Michael's GAC (Magheralin), St Paul's GFC, St Peter's GAC and Wolfe Tone GAC, Derrymacash. There is also a well-respected girl's camogie club at Clann Éireann, and hurling club Seán Treacy's, which has been amalgamated at a youth level with Portadown's St Malachy's, to create North Armagh Hurling.

=== Football ===
The town is home to NIFL Premiership club Glenavon, established in 1889 and based at Mourneview Park. In 1952, Glenavon became the first club outside Belfast to win the Irish League title, and picked up a further two titles in 1957 and 1960.

Previous NIFL Premier Intermediate League clubs, Dollingstown and Oxford Sunnyside will now compete in the Northern Irish inaugural football third tier, National Conference League Premier commencing, 2026–27 season. Both Dollingstown & Oxford Sunnyside play on the outskirts of Lurgan town. Dollingstown play in Planters Park, whilst Oxford Sunnyside are based in Knockramer Park.

Lurgan is also home to several teams which play in the lower leagues, with clubs such as Lurgan Town, Lurgan Celtic, Craigavon City, and AFC Craigavon representing the area in the intermediate divisions of the Mid-Ulster Football League, while Derryhirk United, Hill Street, Lurgan BBOB and Goodyear F.C. play in the junior divisions.

Lurgan Celtic previously played in the NIFL Championship and Premier Intermediate League, but following financial difficulties, the club resigned from league football on 15 August 2019, and planned to resume senior activities from Mid-Ulster Junior Division 3 for the 2020–21 season. Lurgan Celtic have since advanced up the Mid-Ulster Junior Divisions, and are now in Mid-Ulster intermediate-level football competing in MUFL Intermediate B League.

=== Other sport ===
Boxing is a common sport among children and adults, with local boxing clubs including South Paw Boxing and Fitness club and The Fitness Factory.

Cricket has two clubs, Lurgan Cricket Club and Victoria Cricket Club. Rugby union is played by Lurgan RFC, who share their Pollock Park ground with Lurgan Cricket Club.

Tennis is played by Lurgan Tennis Club which is in Lurgan Park. Lurgan Golf Club is an 18-hole parkland course bordering on Lurgan lake.

The Lurgan Park Rally, inaugurated in 1980, was one of the largest motorsport events on the island of Ireland. However, the event has been on hiatus since 2017.

Lurgan Park is home to Lurgan Bowling Club who field lawn bowling teams in the NIBA, the NIWBA and the Veterans leagues.

== Railway links ==
Lurgan railway station opened by the Ulster Railway on 18 November 1841, connecting the town to Belfast Great Victoria Street in the east and Portadown and Armagh in the west. The Great Northern Railway of Ireland provided further access to the west of Ulster which was then closed in the 1950s and 1960s from Portadown railway station.

Presently Lurgan railway station is run by Northern Ireland Railways with direct trains to Belfast Grand Central and as part of the Dublin-Belfast railway line. The Enterprise runs through Lurgan from Dublin Connolly to Belfast Grand Central, and a change of train may be required at Portadown to travel to Newry or Dublin Connolly.

Railway access at Sydenham links into George Best Belfast City Airport on the line to Bangor.

== Road transport and public services ==
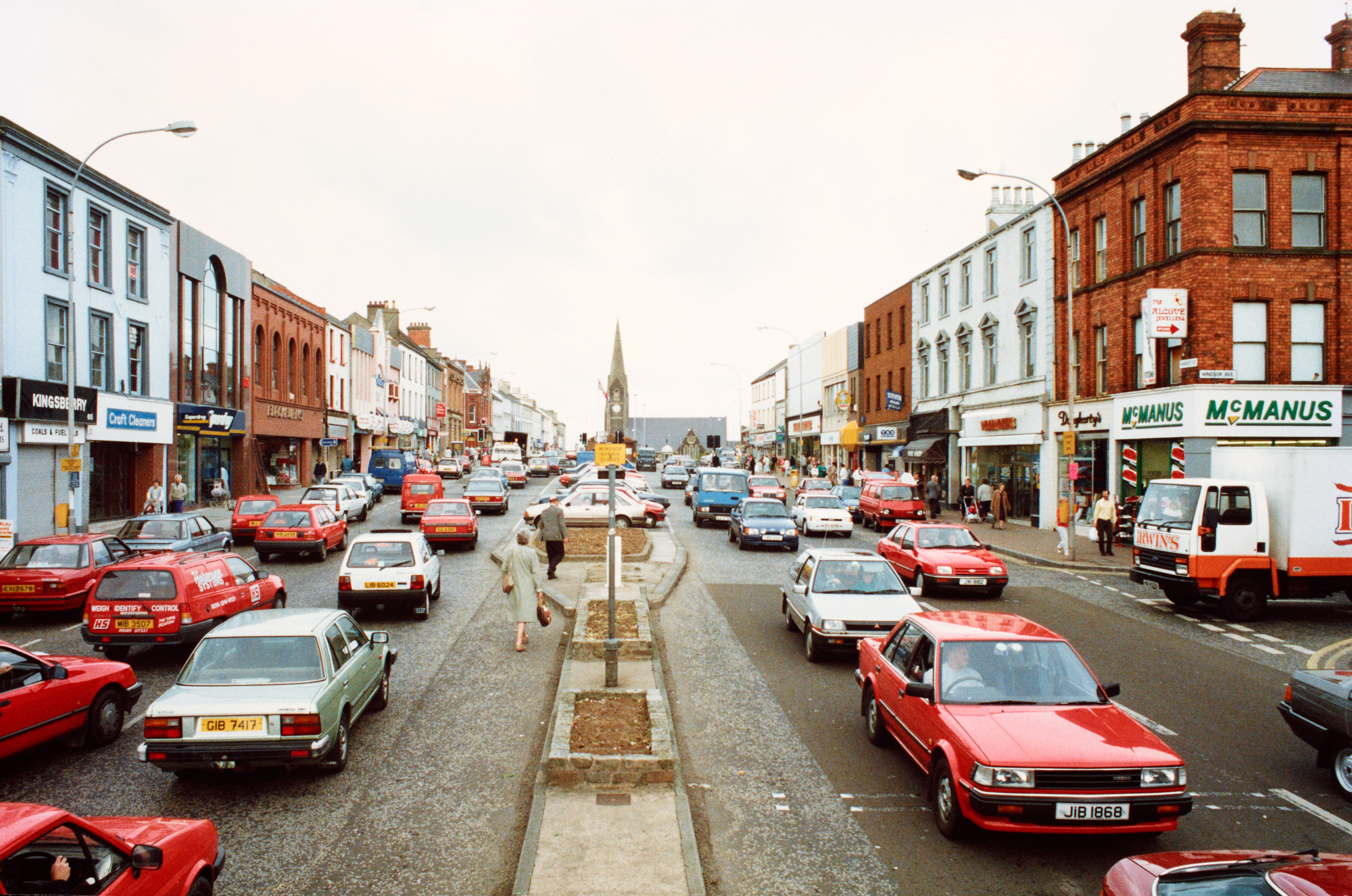
High Street

Lurgan is situated by the M1 motorway connecting the town to Belfast. Bus services, provided by Translink, arrive and depart on a regular basis from bus stops on Market Street to Belfast, Portadown, Armagh, Dungannon, and surrounding areas.

Electricity is supplied by Northern Ireland Electricity which was privatised in 1993 and is now a subsidiary of ESB Group. The gasworks used to be in North St., but there is no longer any town gas since it was abolished in Northern Ireland in the 1980s by the Thatcher government for being uneconomical, although it was restored to the greater Belfast area in 1996. Water is supplied by Northern Ireland Water, a public owned utility.

== Media ==
Lurgan is served by two weekly local newspapers. The Lurgan Mail, published by Johnston Publishing (NI), reports news and sport from around the local area. The Lurgan and Portadown Examiner, which reported local news and sport, was owned by Observer Newspapers NI Ltd, based in Dungannon. This business closed in 2017 and the newspaper ceased publication.

== Notable people ==
=== Living people ===
- Jocelyn Bell Burnell (born 1943) – Northern Irish astrophysicist who discovered the first radio pulsars.
- Barry Douglas (born 1960) – classical pianist and conductor, has residences in Paris and Lurgan.
- Jim Harvey (born 1958) – Lurgan-born professional footballer, assistant manager of the Northern Ireland football team; played for Glenavon, Arsenal and Tranmere Rovers.
- Geraldine Heaney (born 1967) – Lurgan-born Canadian women's ice hockey player and Olympic gold medallist.
- Neil Lennon (born 1971) – Neil Lennon is one of the most successful figures in Celtic football clubs modern history, achieving major honours both as a player (11 trophies) and a manager (8 trophies).
- Jonathan Magee (born 1972) – academic and former footballer
- Gayle Williamson (born 1980) – Miss Northern Ireland 2002 and Miss United Kingdom 2002.

=== Deceased people ===
- Edward Costello (1887–1916) – took part in the Easter Rising in April 1916, received a fatal bullet wound to the head on 25 April and died in Jervis Street Hospital, Dublin.
- John Cushnie (1943–2009) – broadcaster and panellist on BBC Radio 4 show Gardeners' Question Time; presented BBCNI TV show The Greenmount Garden.
- Field Marshal Sir John Dill (1881–1944) – British commander in World War I and World War II; later a diplomat; born in Lurgan
- Len Ganley (1943–2011) – MBE, a world championship snooker referee; was a resident of the town.
- Billy Hanna (c. 1929–1975) – founder and first commander of the Ulster Volunteer Force's Mid-Ulster Brigade; native of Lurgan. He was shot dead outside his home in the Mourneview estate by members of his own organisation.
- Thomas Harte (1915-1940) – executed Irish Republican.
- Sammy Jones (1911–1993) – professional footballer who made over 100 appearances for Blackpool and received one cap for the Irish national team; born in Lurgan
- James Logan (1674–1751) – born in Lurgan; became an American colonial statesman and scholar, secretary to his friend William Penn, and was noted as a jurist, political philosopher, and botanist.
- Cecil Maguire (1930–2020) – Irish landscape and figurative artist.
- William McFadzean (1895–1916) – soldier; died when he threw himself on a box of primed grenades prior to the Battle of the Somme and was awarded the Victoria Cross.
- Richard McGhee (1851–1930) – Irish Protestant Nationalist home rule politician; Land League and trade union activist; Member of Parliament (United Kingdom) for more than 20 years.
- Rosemary Nelson (1958–1999) – human rights solicitor; killed by a loyalist car bomb
- Martin O'Hagan (1950–2001) – journalist for Sunday World newspaper; murdered on 28 September 2001 in front of his wife near his own home in the town.
- George William Russell (1867–1935) – writer; wrote under pseudonym Æ; Anglo-Irish supporter of the nationalist movement in Ireland; critic, poet, painter, mystical writer, and was at the centre of a group of followers of theosophy in Dublin for many years.
- Philip Felix Smith (1825–1906) – soldier; recipient of the Victoria Cross; birth is recorded in the parish of Shankill at St. Peter's RC Church, Lurgan.
- Norman Uprichard (1928–2011) – goalkeeper who began his career playing Gaelic Football with St. Peter's GAC. His decision to sign for Glenavon cost him a league medal under the GAA's now-defunct 'Rule 27'. He was finally awarded his medal by St. Peter's in 2004. He went on to play for Swindon Town, Portsmouth and Southend United at club level, and won 18 caps for Northern Ireland at international level.
- Ike Weir (1867–1908) – boxer, credited with being the first man to take the Featherweight Championship of the World in a match against Frank Murphy on 31 March 1889, in Kouts, Indiana.

== See also ==
- List of towns in Northern Ireland
- List of villages in Northern Ireland
- List of townlands in County Armagh
