= Archibald Acheson, 3rd Earl of Gosford =

British peer and Member of Parliament

The Right Honourable The Earl of Gosford KP
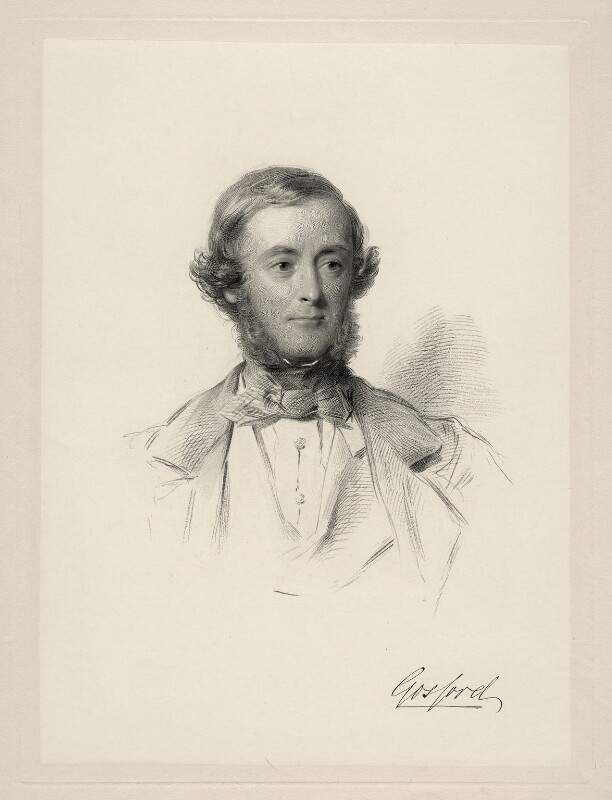
- Archibald Acheson

Member of Parliament for Armagh
- In office 1830–1847 Serving with Charles Brownlow, Sir William Verner, Bt
- Preceded by: Charles Brownlow; Henry Caulfeild
- Succeeded by: Sir William Verner, Bt; James Caulfeild

Personal details
- Born: Archibald Acheson; 20 August 1806
- Died: 15 June 1864 (aged 57)
- Spouse: Lady Theodosia Brabazon (m. 1832)
- Relations: Robert Sparrow (grandfather)
- Children: 7
- Parent: Archibald Acheson, 2nd Earl of Gosford (father)
- Education: Harrow School
- Alma mater: Christ Church, Oxford

Archibald Acheson, 3rd Earl of Gosford KP (20 August 1806 – 15 June 1864), styled Viscount Acheson between 1807 and 1849, was a British peer and Member of Parliament.

== Early life ==
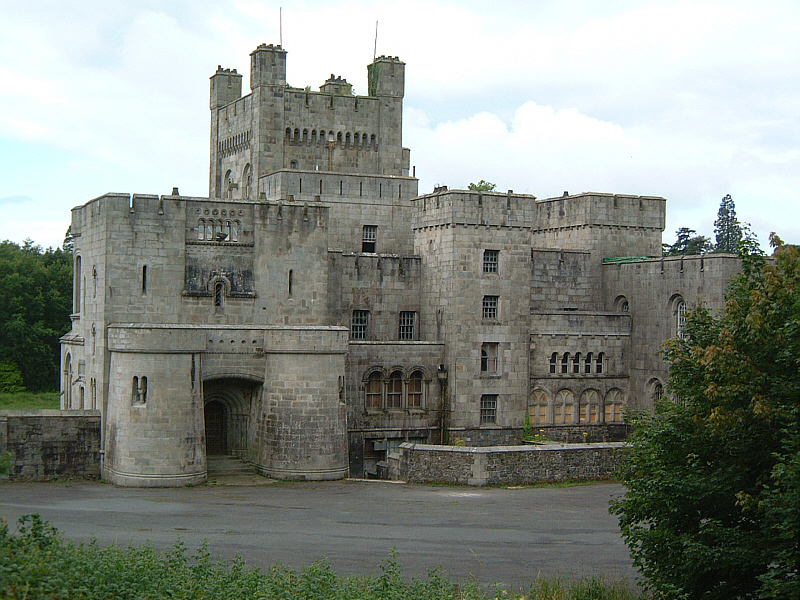
Gosford Castle, County Armagh

Gosford was born on 20 August 1806. He was the only son of Archibald Acheson, 2nd Earl of Gosford of Gosford Castle, County Armagh and the former Mary Sparrow (1777–1841). He had four younger sisters, including Lady Mary Acheson (wife of James Hewitt, 4th Viscount Lifford) and Lady Millicent Acheson (wife of Dr. Henry Bence Jones).

His paternal grandparents were Arthur Acheson, 1st Earl of Gosford and the former Millicent (née Pole) (a daughter of Lt.-Gen. Edward Pole). His mother was the only daughter and heiress of Robert Sparrow of Worlingham Hall and Mary (née Bernard) Sparrow (sister and heiress of Sir Robert Bernard, 5th Baronet and only daughter of Sir John Bernard, 4th Baronet).

He was educated at Harrow School, and matriculated at Christ Church, Oxford in 1825, graduating B.A. in 1828.

== Career ==
He was elected in 1830 as the Member of Parliament for County Armagh in the British House of Commons, a seat he held until 1847, when he was ennobled as 1st Baron Acheson, of Clancairney, County Armagh, in the Peerage of the United Kingdom. He was Lord of the bedchamber between 1831 and 1834. He succeeded to his father's Irish titles and estates in 1849, including the 2,800 acres (4.4 sq mi; 11 km^{2}) Worlingham Hall estate which he sold at auction in August 1849. He was created a Knight of the Order of St. Patrick in 1855.

He was appointed lord-lieutenant and custos rotulorum of County Armagh from February 1864 to his death later that year.

== Personal life ==
On 22 June 1832, he was married to Lady Theodosia Brabazon (1808-1876), daughter of John Brabazon, 10th Earl of Meath and the former Lady Melosina Adelaide Meade (fourth daughter of John Meade, 1st Earl of Clanwilliam). Together, they were the parents of seven children:

- Lady Gertrude Emily Acheson (d. 1927), who married Francis Foljambe, half-brother of Cecil Foljambe, 1st Earl of Liverpool, and eldest son and heir of George Savile Foljambe and Harriet Emily Mary Milner (a daughter of Sir William Milner, 4th Baronet) in 1856.
- Lady Mary Acheson (1835–1892), who married Hon. Leopold William Henry Fox-Powys, second son of Thomas Powys, 3rd Baron Lilford and the former Hon. Mary Elizabeth Fox (sister and heiress of Henry Fox, 4th Baron Holland and only daughter of Henry Fox, 3rd Baron Holland) in 1862.
- Ruthanne Acheson
- Lady Edith Acheson (1837–1906)
- Archibald Brabazon Sparrow Acheson, 4th Earl of Gosford (1841–1922), who married Lady Louisa Montagu, the second daughter of William Montagu, 7th Duke of Manchester and the former Countess Louisa von Alten. His wife was a Lady-in-Waiting to Queen Alexandra.
- Maj.-Gen. the Hon. Edward Archibald Brabazon Acheson (1844–1921), who married Clementina Le Marchant, a daughter of Gen. Sir John Gaspard Le Marchant, in 1869.
- Lady Katherine French Acheson (1847–1898), who married Capt. Frederick William Duncombe, third son of Adm. Hon. Arthur Duncombe (fourth son of Charles Duncombe, 1st Baron Feversham), in 1868.

Lord Gosford died on 15 June 1864 and was succeeded by his son, Archibald. His widow died on 13 February 1876.

Parliament of the United Kingdom
Preceded by Charles Brownlow; Henry Caulfeild	Member of Parliament for Armagh; 1830–1847; With: Charles Brownlow 1830–1832; Sir William Verner, Bt 1832–1847	Succeeded by Sir William Verner, Bt; James Caulfeild
Honorary titles
Preceded by The Earl of Charlemont	Lord Lieutenant of Armagh; 1864	Succeeded by The Lord Lurgan
Peerage of Ireland
Preceded by Archibald Acheson	Earl of Gosford; 1849–1864	Succeeded by Archibald Acheson
Peerage of the United Kingdom
New creation	Baron Acheson; 1847–1864	Succeeded by Archibald Acheson
