= Clare Cryan =

Irish watercolour artist and teacher

- Born: Dublin, Ireland
- Education: Belfast College of Art; National College of Art and Design
- Occupation: Artist
- Writing career
- Subjects: Landscape, still life, floral and figurative

Clare Cryan is an Irish watercolour artist and teacher, who focuses on Landscape and Still life painting.

== Career ==
Cryan was born in Dublin in 1936 and went to school to Sion Hill school, the National College of Art, and the Belfast College of Art. After she completed her studies she was given the appointment of master of the Preliminary School in the National College of Art in 1965 where she worked for four years. Cryan left formal employment to focus on her art and in 1971, she opened the Blue Door Studio in Ballsbridge. She is one of the countries notable art teachers, Patricia McGloughlin is one of her students as is Roddy Moynihan She is teaches with Kenneth Webb in the Irish School of Landscape Painting.

In 1987, she was made a member of the European Institute of Watercolours. She has represented Ireland at the Festival International Paris-Osaka Exhibition.

== Exhibitions ==
Cryan has exhibited in solo shows in Belfast, Wexford, Dublin, Galway (often Kennys Bookshop & Art Gallery) and England.

Her work has been featured in the Royal Hibernian Academy, Royal Ulster Academy and Oireachtas exhibitions in Ireland as well as in Brussels, Paris, Antwerp, The Hague, and Luxembourg.
