= Edward Acheson =

Edward Acheson may refer to:

- Edward Goodrich Acheson (1856–1931), American chemist
- Edward Campion Acheson (1858–1934), bishop of the Episcopal Diocese of Connecticut
- Edward Acheson (British Army officer) (1844–1921), English cricketer and British Army officer
