= Lurgan Park Rally =

Motorsport event in Northern Ireland

- Category: Rally
- Country: Lurgan, Northern Ireland
- Inaugural season: 1980
- Folded: 2017
- Drivers: 50
- Last Drivers' champion: Garry Jennings
- Official website: http://www.lurganparkrally.com/

The Lurgan Park Rally was an annual rally event held in Lurgan Park in Lurgan, Northern Ireland from 1980 to 2016. In 2010, the rally was given a new logo and another new logo was released for the 2012 rally. The Rally also held the Escort Mk2 Challenge. It was the largest single rally venue on the island of Ireland.

== History ==
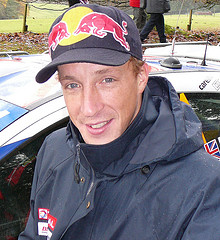
Meeke won the 2012 rally.

The Lurgan Park Rally began in 1980 in a rally won by the late Bertie Fisher. The rally almost folded before the 2009 rally because of no main sponsor when Turkington backed out but was saved by Orchard Motorsport. Unlike Rallies in the Irish Tarmac Rally Championship and other rallies in Northern Ireland, it wasn't cancelled during the 2001 Foot and Mouth disease crisis. Mark Higgins finished second in 2004, 2007 and 2008, behind Kevin Lynch. Lynch holds the record for most consecutive victories with 5 from 2004 to 2008, whilst Kenny McKinstry holds the record for most wins with 11. The last rally was held in 2016, it was announced in March 2017 that the 2017 rally would not go ahead.

=== Sponsors ===
==== Main sponsor ====
- Burmah 1990-1995
- Seat 1996-2002
- Triton Showers 2003-2005
- Turkington 2006-2008
- Orchard Motorsport 2009–2016

==== Other sponsors ====
- Armagh City, Banbridge & Craigavon Borough Council
- Roadside Motors
- Citroën
- KDM Hire
- Rushmere Shopping Centre

== Coverage ==
=== TV ===
RPM held the television rights for the Lurgan Park Rally, which aired on UTV in Northern Ireland.

== Winners ==
- 1980 Bertie Fisher / David Johnston
- 1981 Bertie Fisher / Roy Cathcart
- 1982 John Lyons / William Singleton
- 1983 Kenny McKinstry / Kevin Doyle
- 1984 Bertie Law / Bobby Campbell
- 1985 Kenny McKinstry / Brian McNamee
- 1986 Mikael Sundstrom / Richard Young
- 1987 Kenny McKinstry / John McGaffin
- 1988 Kenny McKinstry / John McGaffin
- 1989 Gwyndaf Evans / Howard Davies
- 1990 Kenny Colbert / Eric Patterson
- 1991 Tony Pond / Don Wilmont
- 1992 Kenny McKinstry / Robbie Philpott
- 1993 Kenny McKinstry / Robbie Philpott
- 1994 Kenny McKinstry / Robbie Philpott
- 1995 David Greer / Michael Reid
- 1996 Kenny McKinstry / Pamela Ballantine
- 1997 Gwyndaf Evans / John McIlroy
- 1998 Patrick Snijers / Willie McKee
- 1999 Gwyndaf Evans / Howard Davies
- 2000 Kenny McKinstry / Noel Orr
- 2001 Gwyndaf Evans / Gary Savage
- 2002 Dom Buckley / Dougie Redpath
- 2003 Kenny McKinstry / Noel Orr
- 2004 Kevin Lynch / Francis Regan
- 2005 Kevin Lynch / Gordon Noble
- 2006 Kevin Lynch / Francis Regan
- 2007 Kevin Lynch / Francis Regan
- 2008 Kevin Lynch / Francis Regan
- 2009 Kenny McKinstry / John Skinner
- 2010 Darren Gass / Nathan Gass
- 2011 Darren Gass / Kerrie Gass
- 2012 Kris Meeke / Gerry McVeigh
- 2013 Garry Jennings / Michael Moran
- 2014 Garry Jennings / Michael Moran
- 2015 Garry Jennings / Michael Moran
- 2016 Garry Jennings / Michael Moran

Owing to his number of wins, Kenny McKinstry has earned the title King of the Park.
