= Brownlow House =

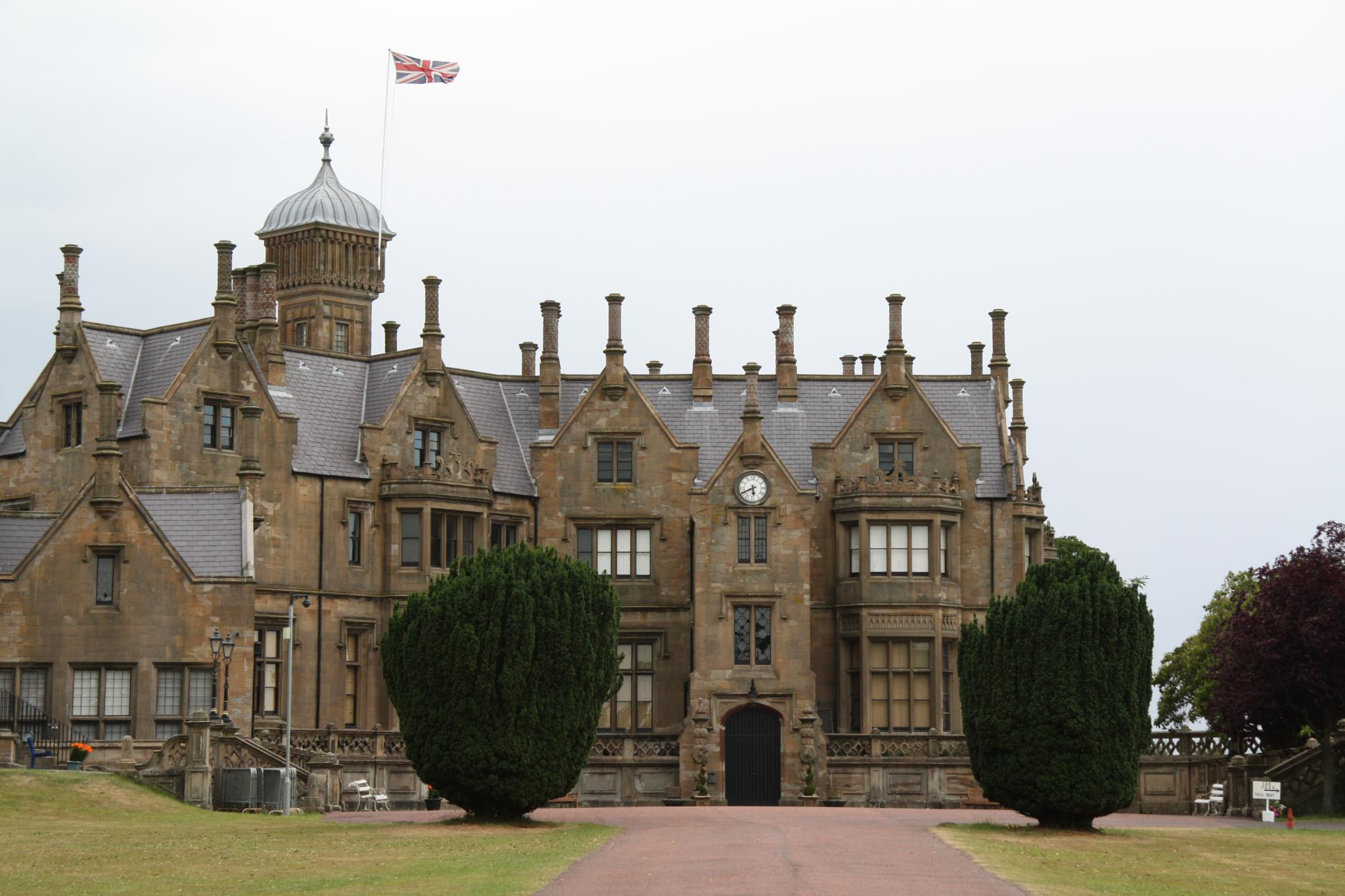
- Brownlow House in 2010
- Interactive map of the Brownlow House area

General information
- Architectural style: Elizabethan
- Location: Lurgan, Northern Ireland
- Coordinates: 54.4658°N 6.3285°W
- Completed: 1833
- Cost: Approx

Design and construction
- Architect: William Henry Playfair

Website
- www.brownlowhouse.com

Brownlow House, also known as Brownlow Castle and Lurgan Castle, is a Grade A listed 19th century house located in Lurgan, Northern Ireland. It was built for Irish politician Charles Brownlow, 1st Baron Lurgan in 1833 by Scottish architect William Henry Playfair and was used as a military headquarters in both world wars.

== History ==
The house was constructed in 1833 by Scottish architect William Henry Playfair for Charles Brownlow, 1st Baron Lurgan and his family. The property remained in the family until the start of the 20th century, when it was purchased by Lurgan Real Property Company Ltd. It was later sold to Lurgan Loyal Orange District Lodge (the local contingent of the Orange Order), who continue to own the property today.

Throughout the world wars of the 20th century, the building played an important role as a headquarters for various military purposes. During the First World War the house acted as the headquarters of the 16th Battalion Royal Irish Rifles and the 10th Battalion Royal Irish Fusiliers, while in World War II it was a base for American troops.

In 1996 the building was badly damaged by an arson attack. Lurgan architectural firm DSC Partners designed the building's refurbishment, which also involved an expert from the restoration that followed the 1992 Windsor Castle fire.

In 2014 a museum was opened in the basement of the building to commemorate its role during World War I.

In August 2015 a World War II exhibition was added, highlighting the building's usage as a military outpost as well as the wider participation of Northern Ireland in providing temporary facilities for the British and American armies at the time.
