= Archibald Acheson, 4th Earl of Gosford =

British peer (1841–1922)

The Earl of Gosford in 1897, dressed as Robert de la Marck.

Archibald Brabazon Sparrow Acheson, 4th Earl of Gosford, KP (19 August 1841 – 11 April 1922) was a British peer.

The son of Archibald Acheson, 3rd Earl of Gosford, he was born at Worlingham Hall, Suffolk, in 1841, and educated at Harrow School; and succeeded to the earldom upon the death of his father in 1864. He was Lord of the Bedchamber to Edward VII, Prince of Wales between 1886 and 1901, and bore the Queen consort's Ivory rod at Edward VII's coronation. He became vice-admiral of Ulster, also received the Order of the Dannebrog, and the Order of the White Eagle (Russian Empire). Since there are two United Kingdom peerages (e.g. Baron Worlingham) subsumed in that Irish Earldom, he was entitled to an automatic seat in the House of Lords. He was Lord Lieutenant of Armagh from 1883 to 1920, and served as Vice-Chamberlain of the Household of Queen Alexandra from 1901.

He was Honorary Colonel of the 3rd Battalion of the Royal Irish Fusiliers from 1899, and Vice-Admiral of Ulster. Gosford died in London in 1922, aged 80, and was cremated at Golders Green Crematorium.

== Family ==
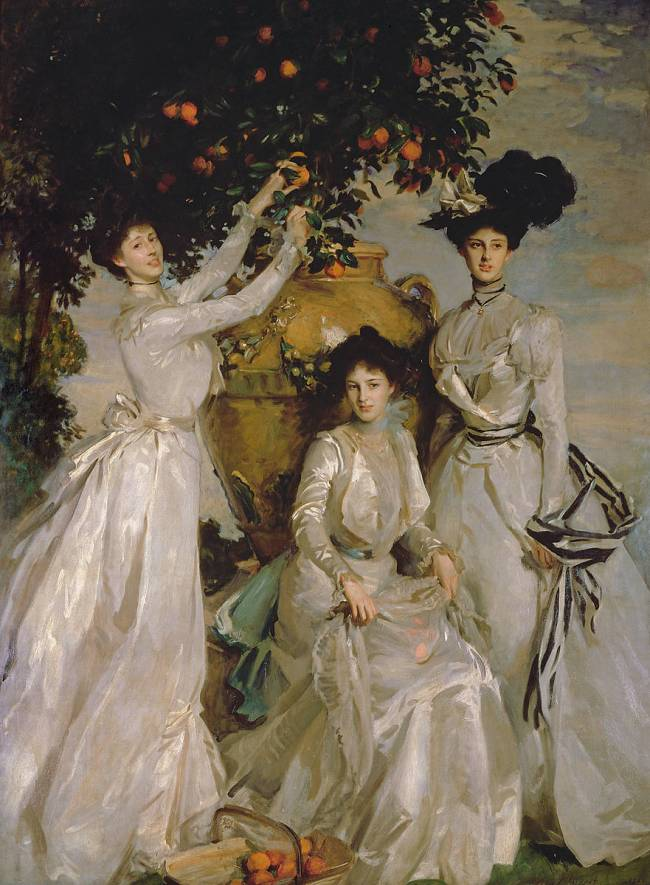
Alexandra, Mary and Theodosia Acheson. The Acheson Sisters painted by John Singer Sargent, 1902

He married Lady Louisa Augusta Beatrice Montagu (named, in 1920, as a Dame Commander of the Order of the British Empire, DBE), daughter of William Montagu, 7th Duke of Manchester, at London on 10 August 1876, with whom he had the following children:

- Archibald Charles Montagu Brabazon Acheson, 5th Earl of Gosford (1877–1954)
- Lady Alexandra Louise Elizabeth Acheson (1878 – 21 January 1958); married Lt.-Col. Hon. William Frederick Stanley, son of Frederick Stanley, 16th Earl of Derby.
- Lady Mary Acheson (1881–????); married Hon. Robert Arthur Ward.
- Lady Theodosia Louisa Augusta Acheson (1882 – 16 October 1977), married Alexander Cadogan.
- Captain Patrick George Edward Cavendish Acheson (30 June 1883 – 30 August 1957)

Honorary titles
Preceded by The Lord Lurgan	Lord Lieutenant of Armagh; 1883–1920	Succeeded by The Lord Armaghdale
Peerage of Ireland
Preceded by Archibald Acheson	Earl of Gosford; 1864–1922	Succeeded by Archibald Acheson
