= Baron Lurgan =

Extinct barony in the Peerage of the United Kingdom

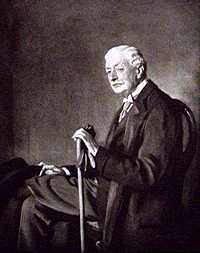
William Brownlow, 3rd Baron Lurgan.

Baron Lurgan, of Lurgan in the County of Armagh, was a title in the Peerage of the United Kingdom. It was created in 1839 for Charles Brownlow, who had previously represented Armagh in the House of Commons. His son, the 2nd Baron, served as a Government Whip from 1869 to 1874 in the first Liberal administration of William Gladstone and was also Lord Lieutenant of Armagh. The title became extinct in 1991 on the death of the latter's great-grandson, the 5th Baron.

== Barons Lurgan (1839) ==
- Charles Brownlow, 1st Baron Lurgan (1795–1847)
- Charles Brownlow, 2nd Baron Lurgan (1831–1882)
- William Brownlow, 3rd Baron Lurgan (1858–1937)
- William George Edward Brownlow, 4th Baron Lurgan (1902–1984)
- John Desmond Cavendish Brownlow, 5th Baron Lurgan (1911–1991)

== Arms ==
Coat of arms of Baron Lurgan
| Crest On a châpeau Azure turned up Ermine a greyhound statant Gules collared Or. Escutcheon Per pale Or and Argent an escutcheon within an orle of martlets Sable. Supporters Dexter a greyhound Argent gorged with a wreath of shamrocks Vert, sinister a highland soldier in his uniform with his firelock all Proper. Motto Esse Quam Videri |
