= William Brownlow, 3rd Baron Lurgan =

Anglo-Irish aristocrat, landowner, hotel proprietor and sportsman

The Right Honourable The Lord Lurgan KCVO JP DL
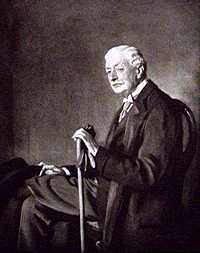
- Born: William Brownlow; 11 February 1858
- Died: 9 February 1937 (aged 78)
- Spouse: Lady Emily Julia Cadogan (m. 1893; died 1909)
- Children: William Brownlow, 4th Baron Lurgan
- Parent(s): Charles Brownlow, 2nd Baron Lurgan; Hon. Emily Anne Browne
- Relatives: Charles Brownlow, 1st Baron Lurgan (grandfather); John Browne, 3rd Baron Kilmaine (grandfather)

William Brownlow, 3rd Baron Lurgan KCVO JP DL (11 February 1858 – 9 February 1937) was an Anglo-Irish aristocrat, landowner, hotel proprietor, and sportsman.

== Early life ==
He was the eldest son of Hon. Emily Anne Browne and Charles Brownlow, 2nd Baron Lurgan. He was the chairman of the prestigious Ritz Hotel, the Carlton Hotel, Booth's Distilleries, and others.

His paternal grandparents were Charles Brownlow, 1st Baron Lurgan, and, his second wife, the former Jane Macneill. His maternal grandparents were John Browne, 3rd Baron Kilmaine and the former Elizabeth Lyon.

In his younger years he was a keen jockey and golfer, and was reportedly one of the few peers to have ever had a hole in one on a golf course. He succeeded to his father's title in 1882.

== Career ==
He was appointed State steward to the recently created Lord Lieutenant of Ireland, Lord Dudley, in September 1902. He also served as a Justice of the Peace for County Down and for County Armagh as well as Deputy Lieutenant of County Armagh.

He was the subject of caricatures by Max Beerbohm. Brownlow succeeded Harry Higgins as chairman of the Ritz upon his death in 1928, and was especially keen on attracting American guests to the hotel. He was a close friend of the Earl of Carnavon and his American wife, Catherine Wendell, and at times he gave the couple the entire second floor of the hotel to accommodate guests.

== Personal life ==
On 7 February 1893, Lord Lurgan married Lady Emily Julia Cadogan (1871–1909), daughter of George Cadogan, 5th Earl Cadogan, and Lady Beatrix Craven. Lady Lurgan attended the Devonshire House Ball of 1897 dressed as Alecto. Before her death in 1909, they were the parents of one son:

- William George Edward Brownlow, 4th Baron Lurgan (1902–1984), who married Florence May Cooper (née Webster) in 1979.

Lord Lurgan died on 9 February 1937. He was succeeded in the barony by his only son, William.

== Arms ==
Coat of arms of William Brownlow, 3rd Baron Lurgan
Crest On a châpeau Azure turned up Ermine a greyhound statant Gules collared Or. Escutcheon Per pale Or and Argent an escutcheon within an orle of martlets Sable. Supporters Dexter a greyhound Argent gorged with a wreath of shamrocks Vert, sinister a highland soldier in his uniform with his firelock all Proper. Motto Esse Quam Videri

Peerage of the United Kingdom
Preceded by Charles Brownlow	Baron Lurgan; 1882–1937	Succeeded by William Brownlow
