= Dominican College Sion Hill =

Roman catholic girls school in Dublin, Ireland

- Sion Hill
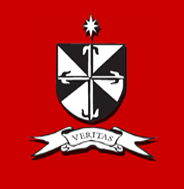

Location
- Blackrock, County Dublin; Ireland
- 53.301496°N 6.189597°W

Information
- Motto: Veritas
- Established: 1836
- Principal: Orla Condren
- Enrollment: 400+
- Website: sionhillcollege.ie

Dominican College Sion Hill is one of the oldest girls' secondary schools in Ireland, founded in 1836 in Blackrock, County Dublin. Its approach to education is based on the Dominican ideal of developing the whole person. "Dominican College Sion Hill aims to help each student achieve their full potential academically, spiritually, emotionally and socially in a happy environment." As of 2025, Ciara Reid is the principal. As of 2019, it had 444 girls enrolled.

It is a national school and has a catchment area of Blackrock-Monkstown-Dún Laoghaire-Dalkey

== History ==
=== Foundation ===
Sion Hill was founded by the Dominican Sisters in 1836, in a suburban villa called Sion Hill because of rare shrubs brought by its owners from the Holy Land. In the beginning the school catered for 40 day pupils, 8 boarders and 10 nuns. By 1950 this had increased to 120 day pupils and 130 boarders. The boarding school closed in the late 1960s and the junior school closed in 1981, the school has since catered only for day pupils.

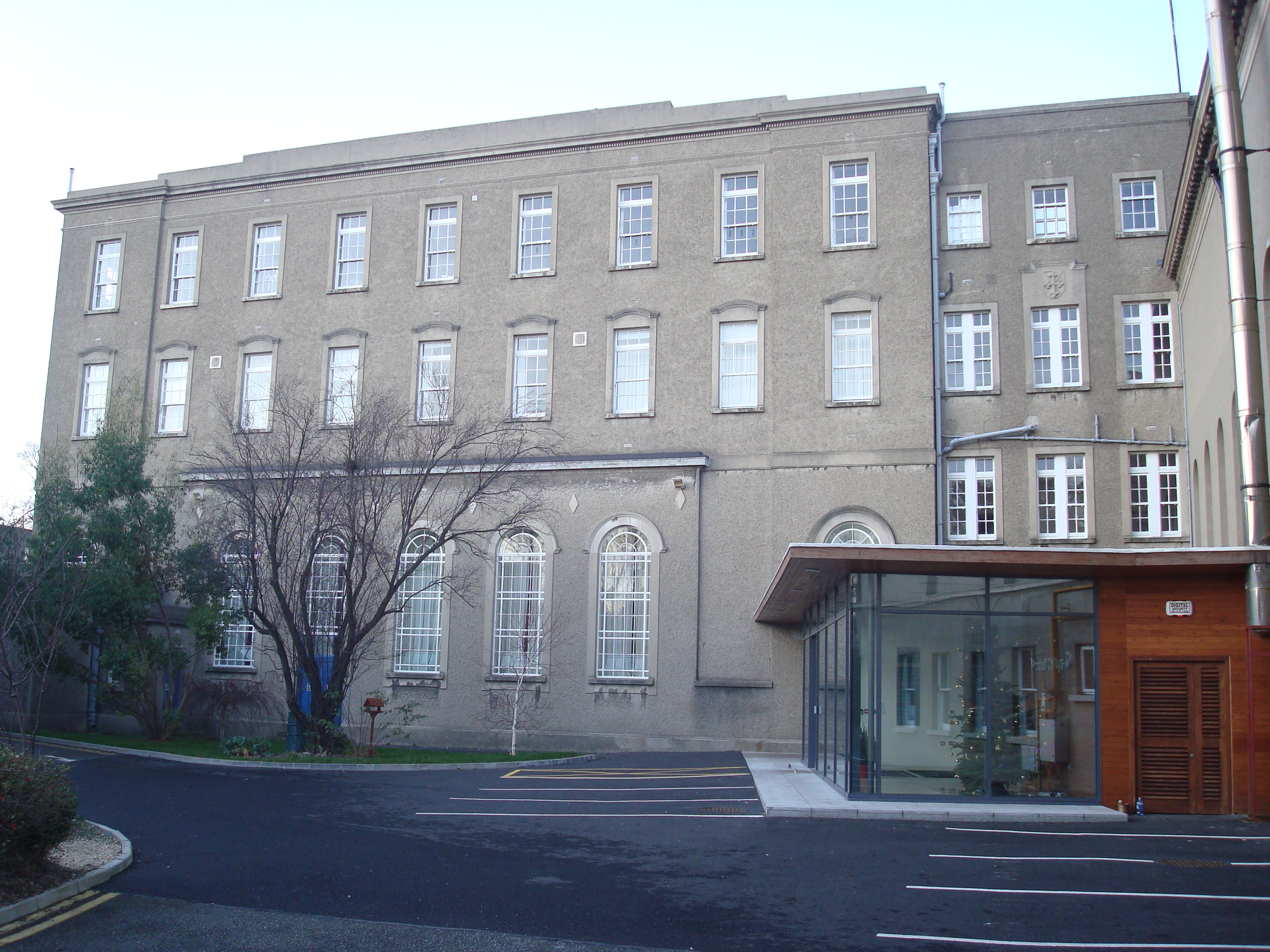
The original school building

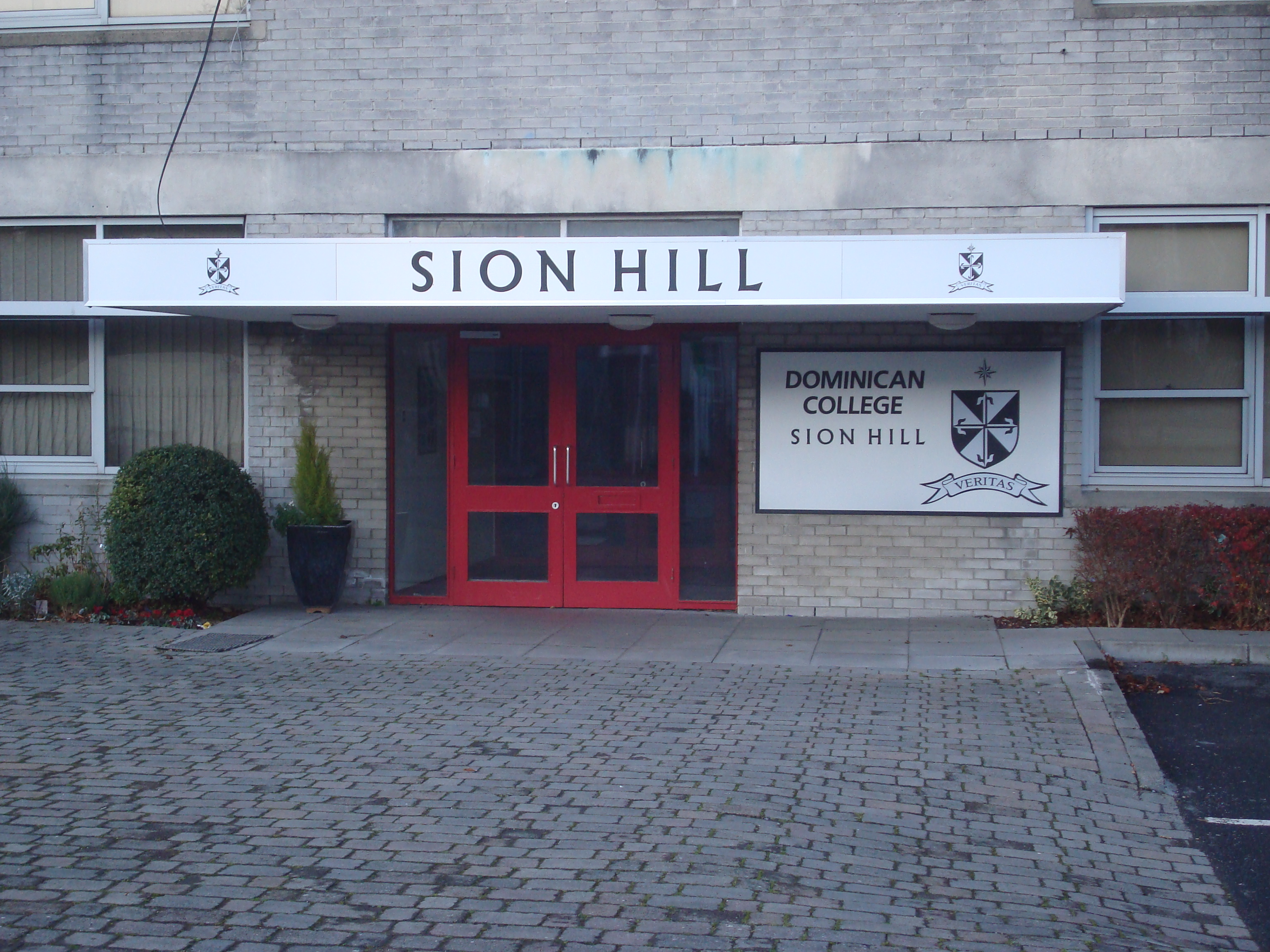
Sion Hill school entrance

=== Grounds ===
There used to be two grass hockey pitches attached to the school but these were sold off in 1990 for residential development, built by 1992. In 2016 a new multi-use all-weather pitch was built to support physical education.

=== Concert Hall ===
A school concert hall was established in 1928, and modernised in 2008.

== Sports ==
=== Hockey ===
Sion Hill has a long tradition of playing hockey. They have teams participating in the Leinster Schoolgirls competitions. The teams are professionally coached and use the facilities of an all-weather hockey pitch.

=== Tennis ===
Sion Hill has teams participating in the Leinster Championships. The tennis facilities comprise 1 tennis court and during summer the hockey pitch can be adapted to provide several more.

=== Basketball ===
Sion Hill has teams participating in the Dublin League. The teams are professionally coached and use 1 indoor court.

=== Other sports ===
There are other sports provided for at Sion Hill, such as athletics and Zumba.

== Extracurricular ==
=== Music ===
The music department offers music at Junior and Leaving Certificate level, with opportunities to pursue the music technology option, and conducting, for the Leaving Certificate.

There are three voluntary choirs and an orchestra in the school which perform at various school functions and go carol singing annually at Powerscourt Townhouse Centre in Dublin. Sion Hill also enters competitions such as the Cork Choral Festival, the Arklow Music Festival (2nd place in 2006), the Wesley Inter-Schools Festival (1st prize, March 1999) and the Department of Education examinations (making the regional finals in 1995 and 1996).

=== Debating ===
Debating is a popular activity with many successes in various competitions debating in English, Irish, French and German.

=== Clubs ===
Sion Hill also has clubs such as St. Vincent Paul, Alive and an Art Club.

== Notable alumni and teachers ==
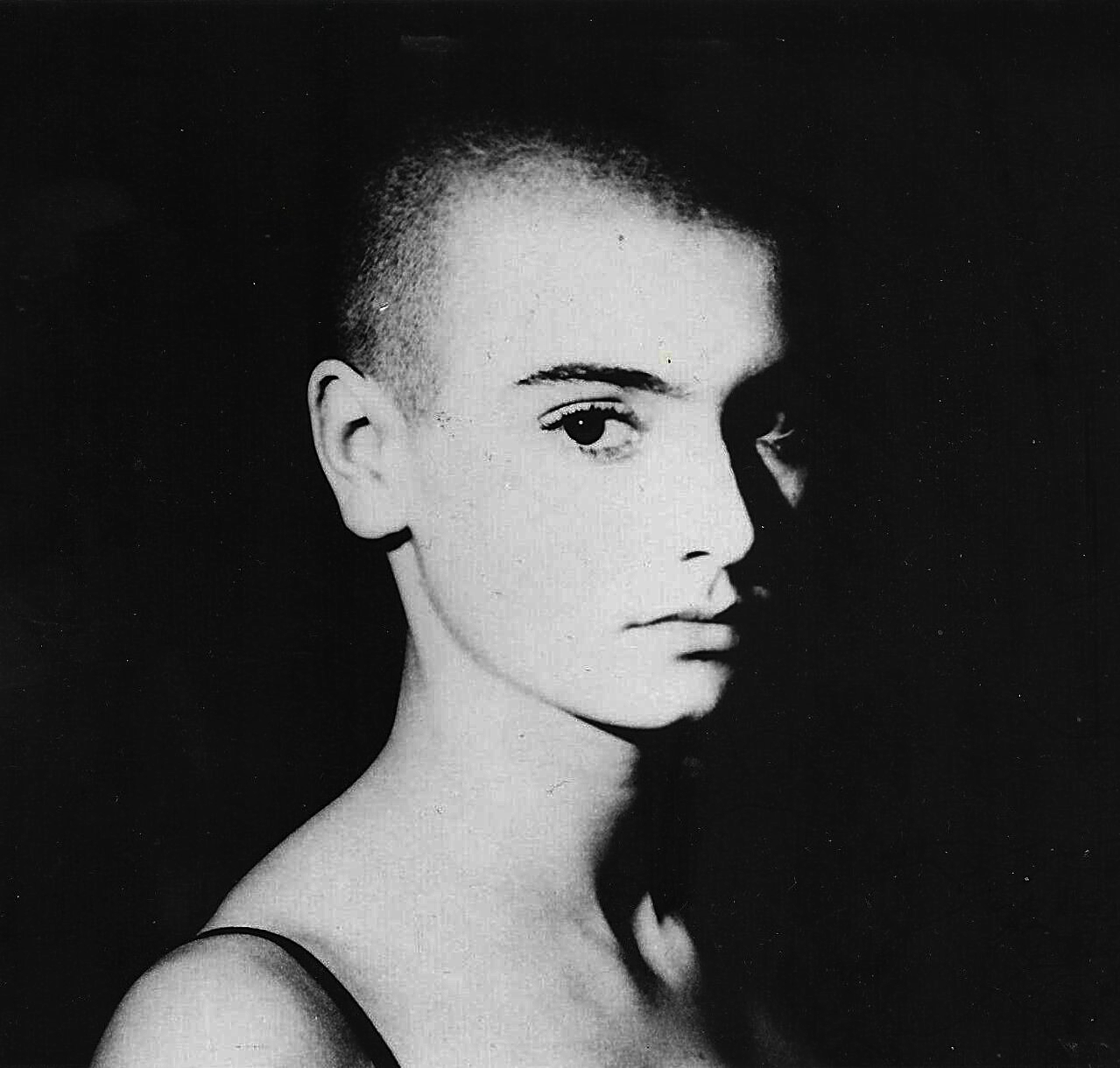
Sinéad O'Connor, who attended Sion Hill as a pupil

- Niamh Bhreathnach, former Minister for Education and Science, Labour Party TD
- Clare Cryan, artist
- Frances Fitzgerald, former Fine Gael, Tánaiste, Minister for Justice and Equality and TD
- Mary Hanafin, former Minister for Education and Science, Fianna Fáil TD
- Róisín Ingle, columnist and features editor at The Irish Times
- Sr. Mary Stanislaus MacCarthy (1849–1897), poet, educator and nun
- Sr. Dr. Margaret Mac Curtain, prioress and principal of Sion Hill
- Frances Moran, barrister and legal scholar
- Breeda Moynihan-Cronin, politician
- Sinéad O'Connor, singer
