= Kenneth Webb (artist) =

British/Irish contemporary artist

Kenneth Webb FRSA
- Born: 21 January 1927 (age 99); London, England
- Education: Belfast School of Art
- Known for: Painting
- Style: Landscape
- Spouse: Joan Webb
- Children: 4

Kenneth Webb is a British artist and founder of the Irish School of Landscape Painting. Known chiefly for his richly coloured impressionist landscapes, he has also produced figurative and abstract work over the course of his career which spans seven decades. He was Head of Painting at the Ulster College of Art (now Belfast School of Art) from 1953 to 1960.

== Biography ==
Born in London in 1927, he moved to Gloucestershire aged 14 after his home was destroyed by a parachute mine. There he attended Lydney Grammar School, and the Lydney School of Art. Outside of school he had a keen interest in art and started sketching landscapes of the Forest of Dean. In 1945 he received a scholarship to the Slade School of Fine Art but was called up for national service in the Fleet Air Arm. After his national service in 1948, he decided not to take up his scholarship and instead enrolled in the Gloucestershire College of Art studying painting, pottery and graphics and graduating with a National Diploma of Design.

He moved to Belfast in 1953, where he took up the post of Head of Painting at the Ulster College of Art. In 1954 he began his Solo Exhibition career with continual shows with Galleries both in Ireland and England. He later moved to Ballywalter, where he established the Irish School of Landscape Painting in 1957. He became known for tutoring notable Irish landscape painters including Cecil Maguire and Basil Blackshaw.

In 1962, Webb started painting on the beach, resulting in the Tidewrack series. Ballywalter would remain their home until the political instability of the 1970s, made them decide to return to Gloucestershire. He purchased a derelict cottage in Clifden and converted it into a studio. Over the years he made numerous paintings Connemara landscape, and his wild garden there. Many of Webb's favorite subjects for painting are the bogs, wildflower and rocks of Connemara.

In 2018, he opened an exhibition of his work at the Royal Dublin Society. The exhibition included 170 of his paintings from between 1955 and 2018.

== Commissioned Work ==
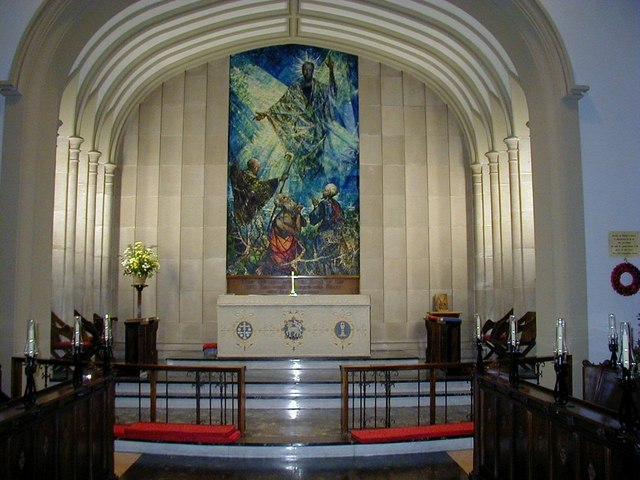
Bangor Abbey – Kenneth Webb Mural

In 1959 Webb was commissioned to paint the altarpiece for Bangor Abbey, which stands 25 ft high and took two years to complete. It depicts Christ rising, wearing a crown of blackthorn, a motif that runs throughout much of his work. Blackthorn can also been seen at the foot of the mural, surrounding three saints. In the wake of this project he was in great demand for commercial work, being commissioned by British Steel, Shell, and The Post Office among others.

The highest price paid at auction for a work by Kenneth Webb was recorded in 2005, when his Galway – City of Tribes series, was sold at Whytes, in Dublin, for €132,000.
