= Cecil Maguire =

Irish landscape and figure painter (1930–2020)

- Born: 20 January 1930; Lurgan, County Armagh
- Died: 7 May 2020 (aged 90); Belfast
- Education: Queen's University Belfast

Cecil Maguire (20 January 1930 – 7 May 2020) was an Irish landscape and figure painter. His work appears in such collections as those at the UN headquarters in New York and the Ulster Museum in Belfast.

== Biography ==
Maguire was born in Lurgan, County Armagh. He graduated from Queen's University Belfast in 1951 and took up an English teaching post in Lurgan College. He was an inspirational teacher, influencing, among others, the later historian, D. G. Boyce. At the school he met Mona Ryan whom he married. They had three daughters.

His parents-in-law introduced him to the Ulster painter, Maurice Wilks. He accompanied Wilks on painting trips to Cushendun and the Antrim coast. He subsequently took evening art classes and joined the Lurgan Arts Club.

He became a member of the Royal Ulster Academy in 1974. The academy awarded him the RUA Gold Medal in 1974 and the RUA Perpetual Gold Medal in 1993. In 1981, he retired from teaching to concentrate on painting and travelling. He spent a great part of each year in Roundstone, Connemara. He died in Belfast in 2020.

In 2002 a book on Maguire's work, Cecil Maguire: towards a retrospective, was published by gallery owner, Martin Davison.
