= Edward Hemsted =

English cricketer

Personal information
- Born: 10 October 1846; Whitchurch, Hampshire, England
- Died: 12 March 1884 (aged 37); Weymouth, Dorset, England
- Batting: Right-handed
- Bowling: Right-arm roundarm fast

Domestic team information
- Years: Team
- 1866–1869: Hampshire

Career statistics
Competition	First-class
Matches	8
Runs scored	220
Batting average	15.71
100s/50s	0/0
Top score	39
Balls bowled	260
Wickets	10
Bowling average	13.90
5 wickets in innings	1
10 wickets in match	0
Best bowling	5/14
Catches/stumpings	3/–
- Source: Cricinfo, 25 January 2010

Edward Hemsted (10 October 1846 — 12 March 1884) was an English first-class cricketer.

The son of Tobias Hemsted, a surgeon from Newbury, he was born in October 1846 at Whitchurch, Hampshire. He was educated in Kent at Chatham House School. Hemsted made his debut in first-class cricket for the Gentlemen of Kent against the Gentlemen of Marylebone Cricket Club at Canterbury in 1863. From 1866 to 1869, he played first-class cricket for Hampshire on seven occasions. In these, he scored 204 runs at an average of exactly 17, with a highest score of 39. With his right-arm roundarm fast bowling, he took 8 wickets at a bowling average of 12.25; he took one five wicket haul, with figures of 5 for 14 against Surrey. His efforts were notable for helping Hampshire to just their second victory in first-class cricket.

Hemsted died at Weymouth, Dorset on 12 March 1884.
