= Charles Brownlow, 1st Baron Lurgan =

Anglo-Irish politician

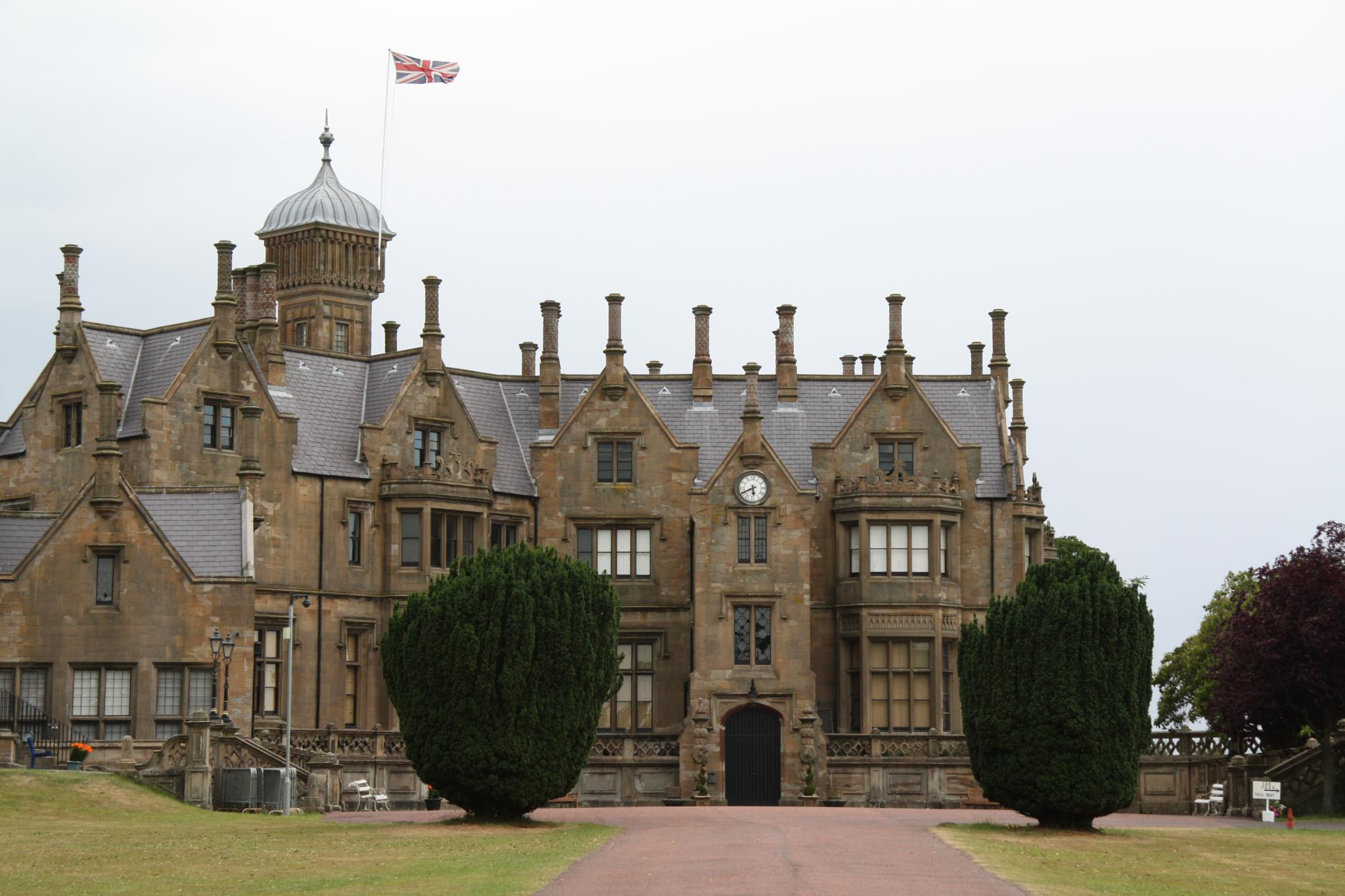
Brownlow House

Charles Brownlow, 1st Baron Lurgan PC (17 April 1795 – 30 April 1847), was an Anglo-Irish politician who sat in the House of Commons from 1818 to 1832, during which time he recanted his Orange Order opposition to Catholic emancipation. He was raised to the peerage in 1839.

== Life ==
Brownlow was the son of Lieutenant-Colonel Charles Brownlow and his wife, Caroline Ashe. His father's elder brother William Brownlow, a Tory MP for Armagh, had died childless in 1815. They were the sons of the politician William Brownlow by his first marriage.

He was educated at Trinity College, Dublin. In 1818 he was elected Member of Parliament for Armagh and held the seat until 1832 as a Whig. During parliamentary debate in 1824, he announced his admission to the Orange Order and presented a vigorous case for the suppression of Daniel O'Connell's Catholic Association. However, the following year a parliamentary committee to inquire into the state of Ireland, and which took evidence from leading Catholic clerics, appeared to have a profound impact on Brownlow.

In April 1825, in a lengthy speech to the House of Commons he conceded that he had been "misled by old alarms, and old prejudices". Accepting that the Roman Catholics of Ireland received their spiritual guidance but not their politics from Rome, he asserted that there was no longer any "shadow of argument" that could justify the continued denial of their claims. In the general election a year later, despite anger and disquiet among many of his Protestant constituents and Orange brethren, he was returned to Westminster.

Whilst advocating Catholic emancipation as a matter of natural justice, Brownlow also insisted that, by pacifying the country, it served the best interests of Protestants whose continued "obstinacy" would otherwise "exclude improvement", "repeal British enterprise"- and "shut out British capital." However, to the dismay of George Ensor, and a coterie of other reformers in the county who campaigned for his re-election, Brownlow accepted, and defended, as a condition for admitting Catholics to parliament and to higher offices, that the property qualification for the electoral franchise in Ireland be raised five-fold to the English ten pound level.

In 1829, the year of the Roman Catholic Relief Act 1829, Brownlow gave the Rev. W.O. O'Brien land for a church in the townland of Derry. His plea for the disestablishment of the Church of Ireland may have cost him his seat in 1832.

In 1833 he had built Brownlow House designed by the Edinburgh architect William Henry Playfair in the Elizabethan style and constructed of Scottish sandstone. He was High Sheriff of Armagh in 1834 and was raised to the peerage by Queen Victoria, as Baron Lurgan, of Lurgan in the County of Armagh, on 14 May 1839.

Brownlow was keen to improve his estate and was actively concerned with the welfare of the people of Lurgan. During the Great Famine, Lord Lurgan, as he had become, was chairman of the Lurgan Board of Guardians and was constantly at his post. While alleviating distress and attending the wants of the Union, he contracted typhus fever which led to his death at the age of 52.

== Family ==
Brownlow married Lady Mary Bligh, daughter of The 4th Earl of Darnley and Elizabeth Brownlow, on 1 June 1822. He married as his second wife Jane Macneill, daughter of Roderick Macneill of Barra, on 15 July 1828. His son by his second wife, Charles Brownlow, succeeded him.

His daughter, the Hon Clara Anne Jane Brownlow (d.1883) married Col. William Macdonald Farquharson Colquhoun Macdonald of St Martins Abbey.

== Arms ==
Coat of arms of Charles Brownlow, 1st Baron Lurgan
Crest On a châpeau Azure turned up Ermine a greyhound statant Gules collared Or. Escutcheon Per pale Or and Argent an escutcheon within an orle of martlets Sable. Supporters Dexter a greyhound Argent gorged with a wreath of shamrocks Vert, sinister a highland soldier in his uniform with his firelock all Proper. Motto Esse Quam Videri

Parliament of the United Kingdom
Preceded by Henry Caulfeild; William Richardson	Member of Parliament for County Armagh; 1818 – 1832; With: William Richardson to 1820; Henry Caulfeild 1820–1830; Viscount Acheson from 1830	Succeeded by Viscount Acheson; William Verner
Peerage of the United Kingdom
New creation	Baron Lurgan; 1839–1847	Succeeded by Charles Brownlow
