= Lord Lieutenant of Armagh =

Ceremonial officer in Armagh, Northern Ireland

This is a list of people who have served as Lord-Lieutenant of Armagh.

There were lieutenants of counties in Ireland until the reign of James II, when they were renamed governors. The office of Lord Lieutenant was recreated on 23 August 1831.

== Lord Lieutenants ==
Name	Image	Term began	Term ended
Sir Neil O'Neill, 2nd Baronet	Portrait Sir Neil O'Neill of John Michael Wright (1680), now in the Tate	1689	1690

== Governors ==
- Archibald Acheson, 2nd Earl of Gosford 1805–1831

== Lord Lieutenants ==
	Name	Image	Term began	Term ended
1.	Archibald Acheson, 2nd Earl of Gosford		17 October 1831	27 March 1849
2.	James Caulfeild, 3rd Earl of Charlemont		3 July 1849	1864
3.	Archibald Acheson, 3rd Earl of Gosford		8 February 1864	15 June 1864
4.	Charles Brownlow, 2nd Baron Lurgan		9 July 1864	15 January 1882
5.	Archibald Acheson, 4th Earl of Gosford		5 April 1883	1920
6.	John Lonsdale, 1st Baron Armaghdale		16 September 1920	8 June 1924
7.	Henry Armstrong		7 July 1924	1939
8.	Sir Norman Stronge, 8th Baronet		5 December 1939	21 January 1981
9.	Michael Torrens-Spence		20 July 1981	1989
10.	Nicholas Alexander, 7th Earl of Caledon		15 May 1989	Present

== Deputy lieutenants ==
A deputy lieutenant of Armagh is commissioned by the Lord Lieutenant of Armagh. Deputy lieutenants support the work of the lord-lieutenant. There can be several deputy lieutenants at any time, depending on the population of the county. Their appointment does not terminate with the changing of the lord-lieutenant, but they usually retire at age 75.

=== 21st century ===
- 14 June 2010: Jill Armstrong
- 5 July 2016: Simon Dougan
- 11 November 2018: Simon Cassells

== See also ==
- County Armagh
- List of lord lieutenants in the United Kingdom
