= Worlingham Hall =

Country house in Suffolk, England

Coordinates: 52.4549°N 1.5936°E

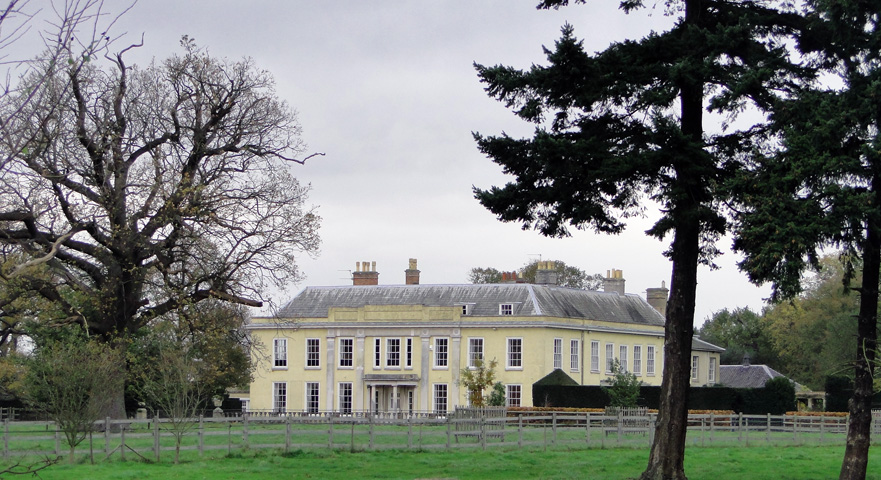
Worlingham Hall

Worlingham Hall is a Grade I listed Georgian country house in Worlingham, 1 mile (1.6 km) to the east of Beccles in the English county of Suffolk. The hall was built in the 18th century, possibly based on an earlier 17th century house, and as of 2014 is a country house hotel.

The hall is known to have been enlarged and remodelled in around 1800 by Francis Sandys for Robert Sparrow. The original building may have been built by John Felton who died in 1703, potentially dating the building to the 17th century. It is built in two storeys of brick and stucco, with a 7-bay frontage. To the left of the main block was originally an Orangery, now converted to other uses. The interior includes an octagonal staircase hall with a stone Imperial dividing staircase having wrought-iron balustrading and a mahogany handrail.

The manor of Worlingham had been bought from the Duke family in the 17th century by John Felton, the son of Sir John Felton, of Playford. The Dukes had owned it for several generations. Felton's only daughter, Elizabeth, married Sir John Playters, of Sotterley, who sold Worlingham to Sir Thomas Robinson, Bart., of Kentwell Hall in Long Melford. He died without an heir in 1743 and the manor was eventually sold to Robert Sparrow in 1755. Sparrow's granddaughter Mary, who had married the Irish Peer the Right Hon. Archibald Acheson, Earl of Gosford in 1805, later inherited the property. The Earl served as Governor General of Canada from 1835 to 1838.

The 2,800 acres (4.4 sq mi; 11 km^{2}) estate was sold at auction by the 3rd Earl in August 1849 and thereafter passed through several hands before being gradually broken up and sold off. The hall itself fell into a state of disrepair. It was bought in 1962, standing in only 20 acres (0.031 sq mi; 0.081 km^{2}) of land, by Viscount Colville, who undertook the restoration of the building. In 2010 it was offered for sale for approximately £4m.
