= Charles Brownlow, 2nd Baron Lurgan =

Anglo-Irish Liberal politician

Charles Brownlow, 2nd Baron Lurgan KP (10 April 1831 – 15 January 1882), was an Anglo-Irish Liberal politician.

Lurgan was the son of Charles Brownlow, 1st Baron Lurgan, and his second wife Jane (née Macneill), and succeeded his father in the barony in 1847. He sat on the Liberal benches in the House of Lords and served as a Lord-in-waiting (government whip in the House of Lords) from 1869 to 1874 in the first Liberal administration of William Ewart Gladstone. Between 1864 and 1882 he also held the honorary post of Lord Lieutenant of Armagh. In 1864 he was made a Knight of the Order of St Patrick.

Lord Lurgan married the Hon. Emily Anne, daughter of John Browne, 3rd Baron Kilmaine, in 1853. He died in January 1882, aged only 50, and was succeeded in the barony by his son William. Lady Lurgan died in September 1929.

Lurgan was the owner of the famous greyhound Master McGrath.

== Arms ==
Coat of arms of Charles Brownlow, 2nd Baron Lurgan
Crest On a châpeau Azure turned up Ermine a greyhound statant Gules collared Or. Escutcheon Per pale Or and Argent an escutcheon within an orle of martlets Sable. Supporters Dexter a greyhound Argent gorged with a wreath of shamrocks Vert, sinister a highland soldier in his uniform with his firelock all Proper. Motto Esse Quam Videri

Honorary titles
Preceded by The 3rd Earl of Gosford	Lord Lieutenant of Armagh; 1864–1882	Succeeded by The 4th Earl of Gosford
Peerage of the United Kingdom
Preceded by Charles Brownlow	Baron Lurgan; 1847–1882	Succeeded by William Brownlow
