= Charles Knox (British Army officer) =

British Army general (1846–1938)

Lieutenant-General Sir Charles Knox KCB
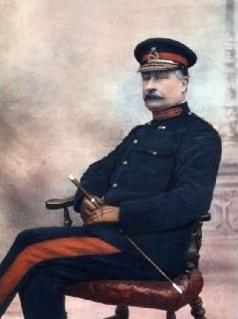
- Knox in 1902
- Born: Sir Charles Edmond Knox; 28 February 1846
- Died: 1 November 1938 (aged 92)
- Military career
- Allegiance: United Kingdom
- Branch: British Army
- Service years: 1865–1909
- Rank: Lieutenant-General
- Nickname: Nice Knox
- Unit: King's Shropshire Light Infantry
- Commands: King's Shropshire Light Infantry; 13th Infantry Brigade; 4th Infantry Division
- Conflicts: Bechuanaland Expedition; Second Boer War
- Awards: Knight Commander of the Order of the Bath; Mention in Despatches (3)

Lieutenant-General Sir Charles Edmond Knox, KCB (28 February 1846 – 1 November 1938) was an Ulster Scots officer of the British Army.

== Early life ==
Knox was the son of Robert Knox, DD, Archbishop of Armagh, and his wife Catherine Delia FitzGibbon, was the daughter of Thomas Gibbon FitzGibbon of Ballyseeda, County Limerick. He had two brothers and two sisters. His great-grandfather Thomas Knox, 1st Viscount Northland (1729–1818) of Dungannon Park, County Tyrone, was created the first Viscount Northland.

He was educated at Eton and Sandhurst.

== Career ==
On 30 June 1865, Knox was commissioned into the British Army's 85th Regiment of Foot (Bucks Volunteers) as an ensign by purchase. This later became the 2nd Battalion the King's Shropshire Light Infantry, and the whole of his regimental service was done in that corps. On 7 August 1867, he was promoted to lieutenant by purchase, on 11 June 1876, captain in a death vacancy, and on 1 July 1883, major. He served under Sir Charles Warren in the Bechuanaland Expedition between 1884 and 1885, and while there, had raised and commanded the 4th Pioneer Regiment. The expedition did not see any fighting but due to his performance Knox was promoted a brevet lieutenant colonel; brevet colonel on 9 December 1889; and he was promoted substantive lieutenant colonel on 11 February 1890, and was commanding officer of a battalion of his regiment from then to 11 February 1894. After a period of half-pay, he went on to command the 32nd Regimental District (Duke of Cornwall's Light Infantry) based in Bodmin, from 29 January 1895 to 29 November 1899, when he was promoted to temporary major general in command of an infantry brigade at Aldershot.

Just five days later, with the outbreak of the Boer War, Knox was given command of 13th Infantry Brigade on the mobilisation of the 6th Division under General Kelly-Kenny, which formed part of the South African Field Force. Following the Relief of Kimberley, he took part in the Battle of Paardeberg in February 1900, and was severely wounded by a gunshot in the chest. In March 1902, he was appointed to the command of the Bloemfontein garrison in the Orange River Colony. Following the end of the war in June that year, Knox returned to the United Kingdom in the SS Dunottar Castle, which arrived at Southampton in July 1902. For his services during the war, he was thrice Mentioned in Despatches, awarded the Queen's South Africa Medal and the King's South Africa Medal, promoted substantive major general (dated 4 December 1899), and knighted as a Knight Commander of the Order of the Bath (KCB) in the April 1901 South Arica Honours list (the order was dated to 29 November 1900, and he was only invested as such after his return home, by King Edward VII at Buckingham Palace on 24 October 1902).

After returning from the war, he was given command of 4th Division, 2nd Army Corps on 30 October 1902, stationed on Salisbury Plain. He was promoted lieutenant general on 6 December 1905, and relinquished command on 1 June 1906. He was offered the post of Governor of Bermuda, but declined on the grounds that he was unmarried.

He was appointed Colonel of the Regiment of the King's Shropshire Light Infantry on 6 January 1907 and continued to hold the post until January 1921, though he retired from active service on 10 May 1909.

He was a member of the Naval and Military Club. In retirement he served as a company chairman.

Knox died on 1 November 1938, his obituary in Time magazine dated 14 November 1938, reads:

Died. Sir Charles Edmond Knox, 92, British lieutenant general who in the Boer War chased elusive Boer General Christian Rudolph De Wet 800 miles but never caught him; of old age; in Putney, England.

That in The Times noted:

Sir Charles' popularity amongst his fellows may be judged by his nickname "Nice Knox." Invariably cheerful, even in adversity, he had a great appreciation of the good things in life; but he always remembered others, particularly those under his command.

== Notes ==
Honorary titles
Preceded by Sir Henry Dr Bathe	Colonel of the King's Shropshire Light Infantry; 1907−1921	Succeeded by Raymond Northland Revell Reade
