= Alfred Kirke Ffrench =

Recipient of the Victoria Cross

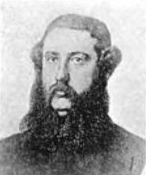
- Born: 25 February 1835; Meerut, British India
- Died: 29 December 1872 (aged 37); Chiswick, London
- Burial place: Brompton Cemetery, London
- Military career
- Allegiance: United Kingdom
- Branch: British Army
- Rank: Captain
- Units: 53rd Regiment of Foot
- Conflicts: Indian Mutiny
- Awards: Victoria Cross

Alfred Kirke Ffrench VC (25 February 1835 – 29 December 1872) was a recipient of the Victoria Cross, the highest and most prestigious award for gallantry in the face of the enemy that can be awarded to British and Commonwealth forces.

Ffrench was twenty-two years old, and a lieutenant in the 53rd Regiment of Foot (later The King's Shropshire Light Infantry) of the British Army during the Indian Mutiny, when he performed the deed on 16 November 1857 at Lucknow, India for which he was awarded the V.C.:

For conspicuous bravery on the 16th of November, 1857, at the taking of the Secundra Bagh, Lucknow, when in command of the Grenadier Company, being one of the first to enter the building. His conduct was highly praised by the whole Company. Elected by the Officers of the Regiment.

He later reached the rank of captain. Ffrench took ill whilst serving in Bermuda and died in London. The officers of his regiment wore black arm bands upon the notice of his death, following which he was buried at Brompton Cemetery. A memorial tablet to him was also placed in St Chad's Church, Shrewsbury.

His Victoria Cross is displayed at The King's Shropshire Light Infantry Museum in Shrewsbury Castle, Shropshire, England.
