= Charles Pye =

English soldier

Charles Pye VC
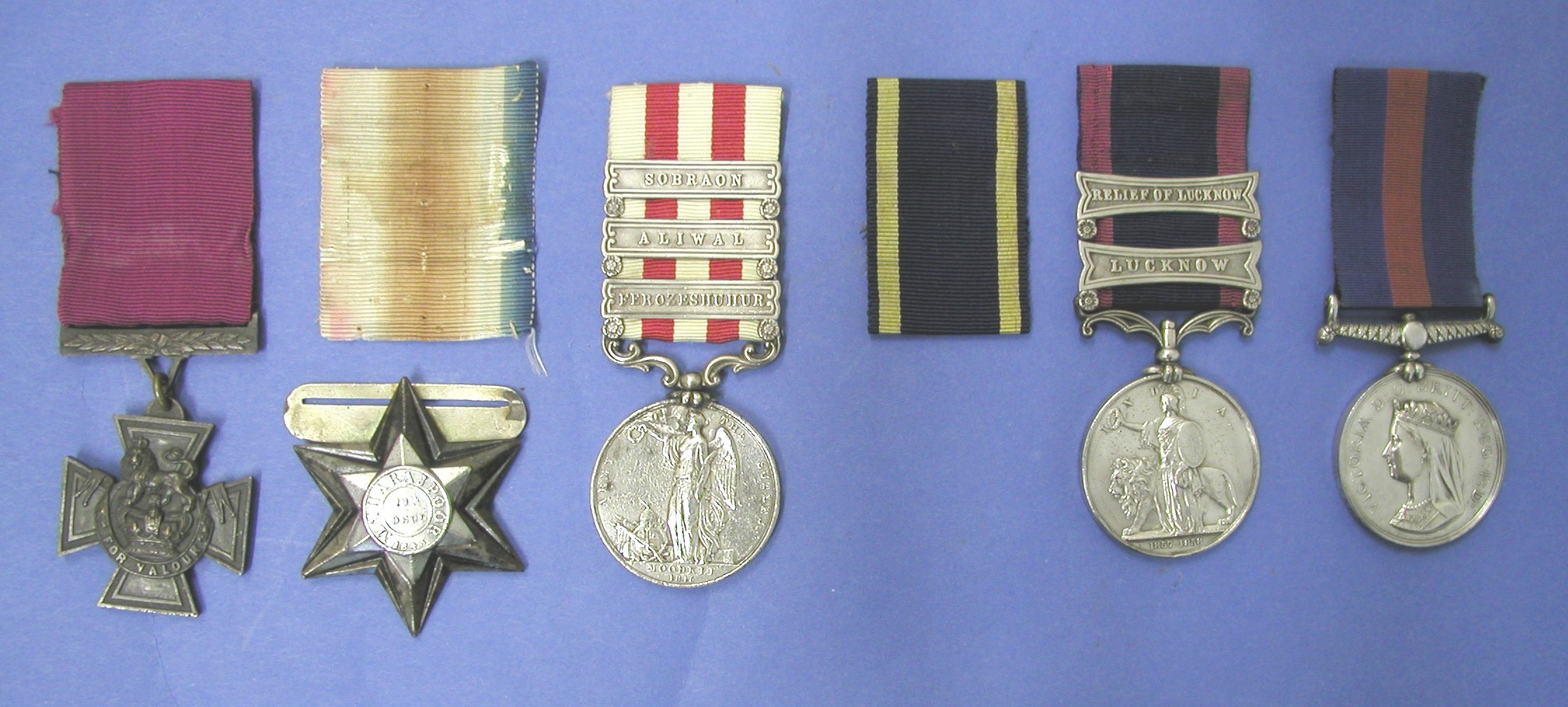
- Charles Pye's medal group now at the Auckland War Memorial Museum
- Born: Forebridge, Staffordshire
- Died: 12 July 1876 (aged 55); Kirkstall, Victoria, Australia
- Burial place: Tower Hill cemetery, Koroit
- Military career
- Allegiance: United Kingdom
- Branch: British Army
- Rank: Captain
- Units: 40th Regiment of Foot; 31st Regiment of Foot; 53rd Regiment of Foot; New Zealand Militia
- Conflicts: First Anglo-Sikh War; Second Anglo-Sikh War; Indian Mutiny; New Zealand Wars
- Awards: Victoria Cross

Charles Pye VC (chr: 24 September 1820 – 12 July 1876) was an English recipient of the Victoria Cross, the highest and most prestigious award for gallantry in the face of the enemy that can be awarded to British and Commonwealth forces.

== Details ==
Pye was approximately 37 years old, and a sergeant-major in the 53rd Regiment of Foot (later The King's Shropshire Light Infantry), British Army during the Indian Mutiny when the following deed took place on 17 November 1857 at Lucknow, India for which he was awarded the VC:

For steadiness and fearless conduct under fire at Lucknow, on the 17th of November, 1857, when bringing up ammunition to the Mess House, and on every occasion when the Regiment has been engaged. Elected by the non-commissioned officers of the Regiment.

Charles Pye is not to be confused with Lieutenant-Colonel Charles Colquhoun Pye (11 Nov 1834 – 17 Feb 1872), son of Henry John Pye and Mary Anne Walker of Clifton Campville, Staffordshire. Charles Colquhoun Pye was not the recipient of the Victoria Cross.

== Early life ==
Charles Pye was the eldest child of Thomas Pye and Alice Hall. Born in 1820 his birth date is unknown. His baptism occurred on 24 September 1820 at St Mary's church, Castle Church, Staffordshire. Charles was probably a few months old when he was baptised. His death certificate and obituary state he was 56 years old when he died, which suggests he was born prior to July 1820.

Charles's brothers, Timothy (b 1822) and Philip (b 1824), were born at Rickerscote where their father, Thomas Pye, was a labourer. His sister Harriet (b 1826) and brother Peter (b 1830) were born in Birmingham, where Thomas was a brickmaker.

Following the death of their mother, Thomas took his children back to the family home at Rickerscote to be raised by his brother, George Pye and sister Mary Pye. George Pye was later quoted in a newspaper saying that Charles was "educated at Stafford" and indeed his later correspondence was well written.

With the conviction and transportation of their father in 1836 the children were virtually orphaned. Where Charles worked after the completion of his schooling is unknown, however, by 1840 he enlisted at Coventry, Warwickshire, from there being sent for service to India with the 40th Regiment.

Pye was promoted to Corporal and transferred into the 53rd Foot in 1858. He became adjutant in 1859 and was promoted without purchase to lieutenant on 9 April 1860.

On 14 April 1860 the 53rd Regiment, including Charles's wife, Mary Ann and her children, Catherine and Matthew Farrell, returned to England on the Lady Clarendon.

In 1862 Charles Pye took his discharge and emigrated to New Zealand with his wife and stepdaughter. Here he was appointed Captain of the Auckland Militia in July 1863, and the following year as Captain of the Colonial Defence Force. He served at Hairini and Te Ranga in the Bay of Plenty and a redoubt near Tauranga, Pye's Pa was named in his honour.

Following his discharge Charles Pye lived at Papakura then for a short time at Shortland (Thames) where he owned the Duke of Edinburgh goldmine. In 1875 he sailed to Australia, travelling to Kirkstall, Victoria, Australia where he purchased his father's farm (his father having married again, had a second family in the district) in 1876 a month before he died on 12 July 1876. He is buried in the same cemetery as his three half brothers.

His medals were donated to the Auckland War Memorial Museum.

== Later life ==
At the end of the Maori wars the Colonial Defence Force was stationed at Papakura where Charles was involved in the local community. He had been a far better soldier than a businessman as his bankruptcy attested. Following the disbanding of the Defence Force in 1866 and the opening up of the goldfields at Thames, Charles and his wife, Mary Ann moved to Karaka Hill, Shortland, Thames. He purchased the Duke of Edinburgh goldmine but was later led into speculating and lost heavily. By 1875, having discovered his father's address he sailed to Australia where they reunited after an absence of forty years. He was taken ill with bronchitis which proved fatal and was buried in the Tower Hill cemetery at Koroit near Warrnambool. Mary Ann Pye died at her son-in-law's home at Mangere on 31 December 1900 and is buried at the Mangere cemetery with her daughter and grandchildren. The farming locality of Pyes Pa, south of Tauranga, is named after him. Memorials honouring Captain Pye can be found at Stafford, UK (his birthplace) and Kirkstall near Koroit, Victoria (his death place).

== Gallery ==
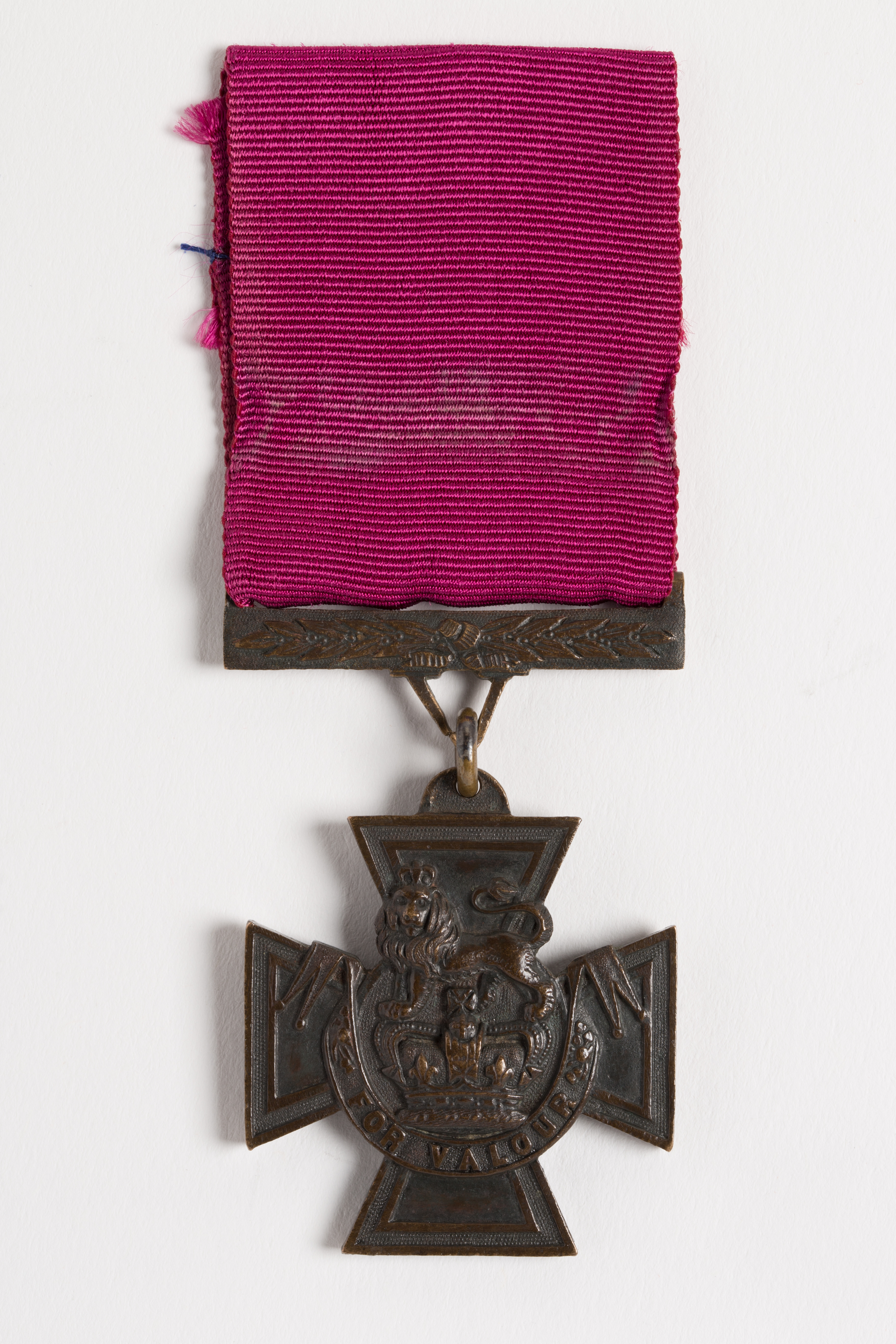
Obverse of Victoria Cross awarded to Charles Pye

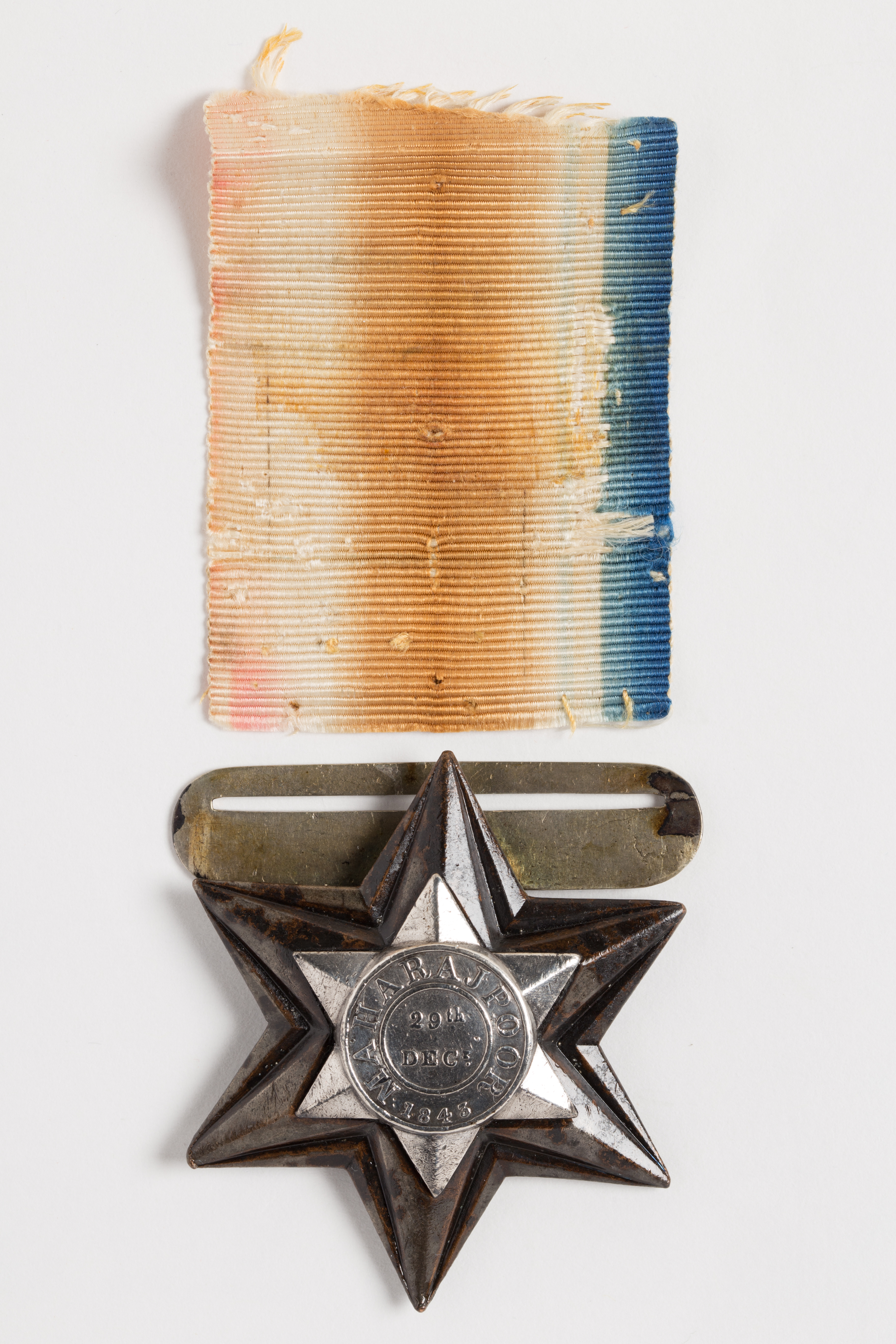
Gwalior Campaign Star 29 December 1843 awarded to Private Charles Pye

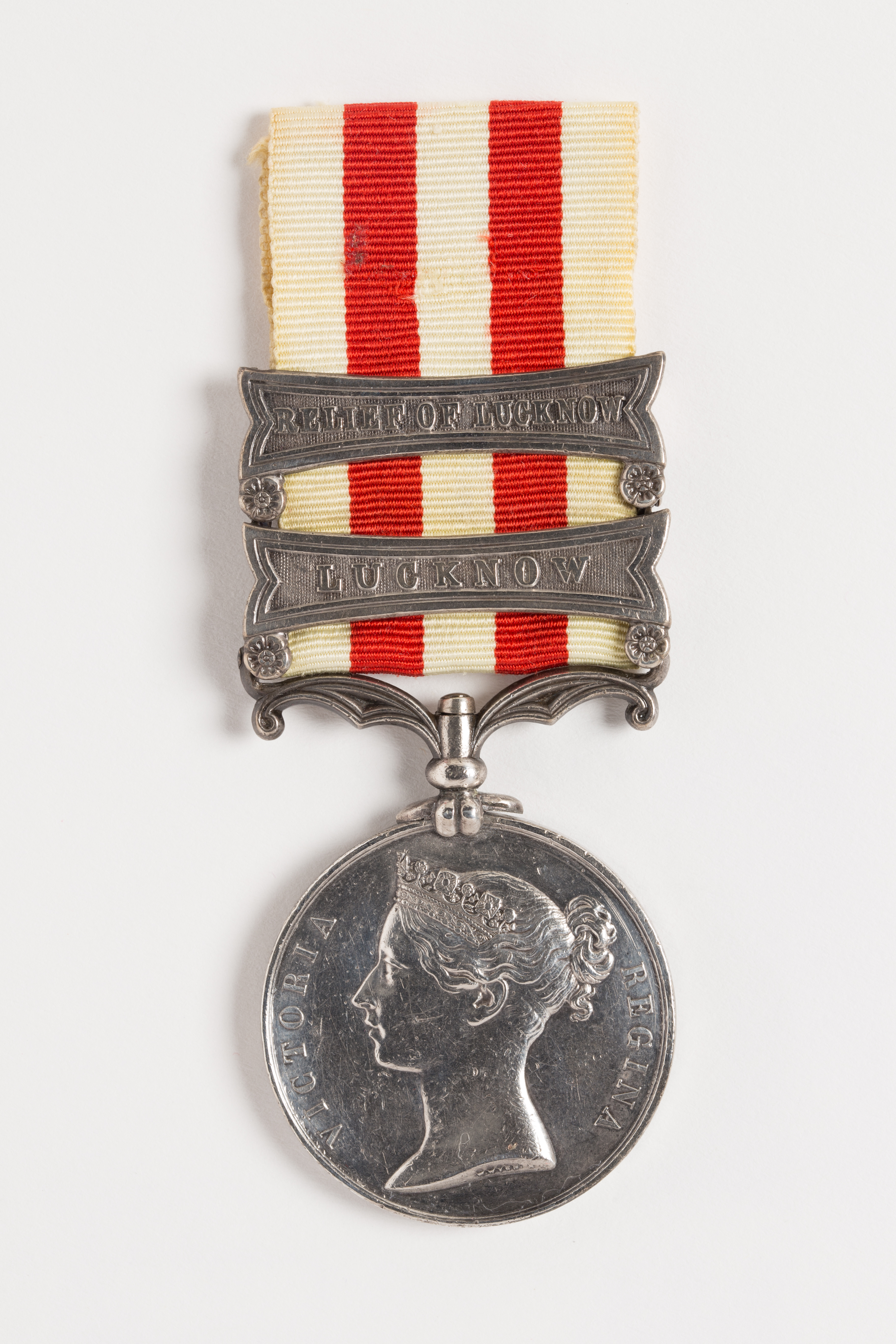
Indian Mutiny Medal 1857–58 with bars for Lucknow and Relief of Lucknow awarded to Ensign Charles Pye, 53rd Regiment

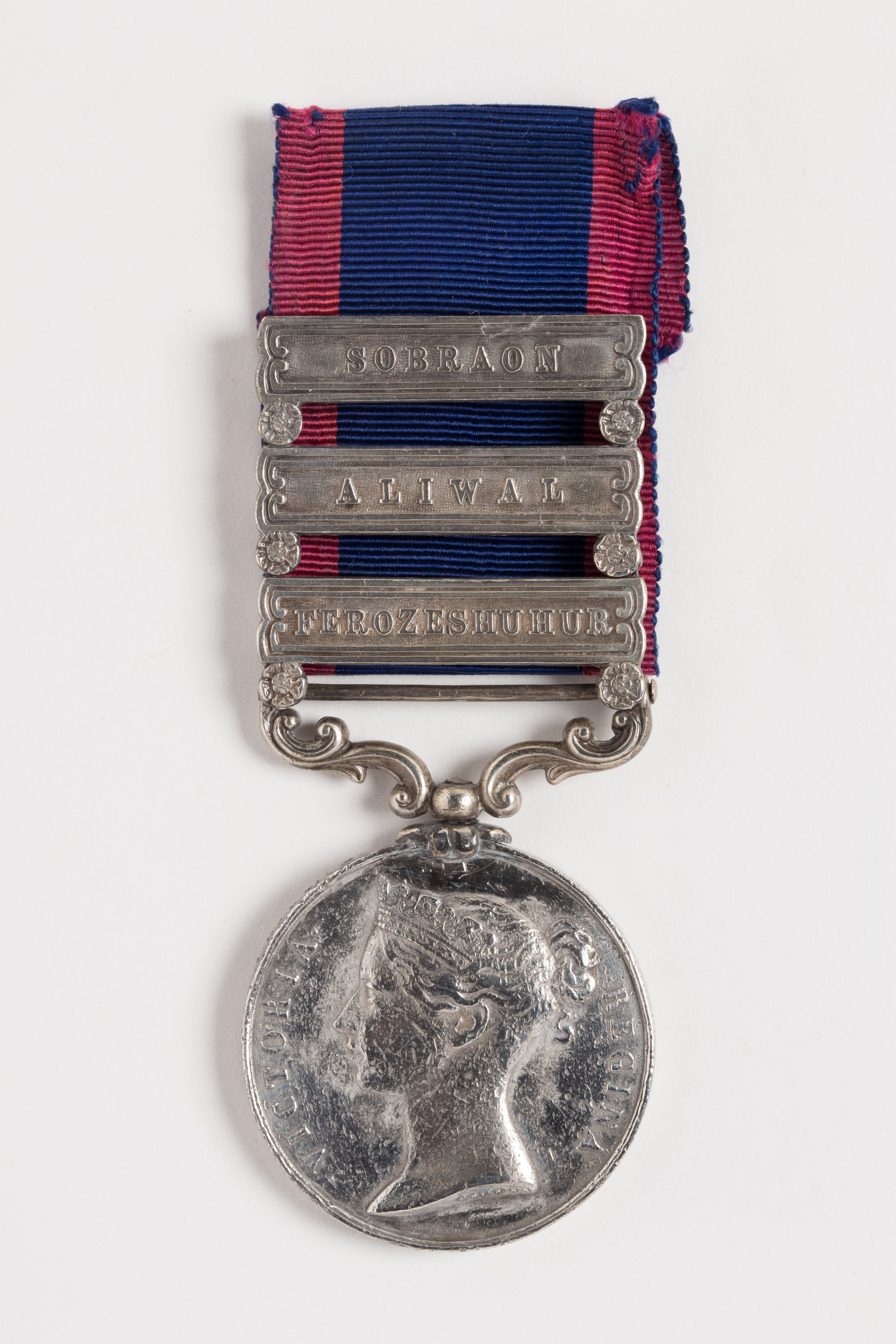
Sutlej Campaign Medal 1845-46 awarded to Corporal Charles Pye, 31st Regiment

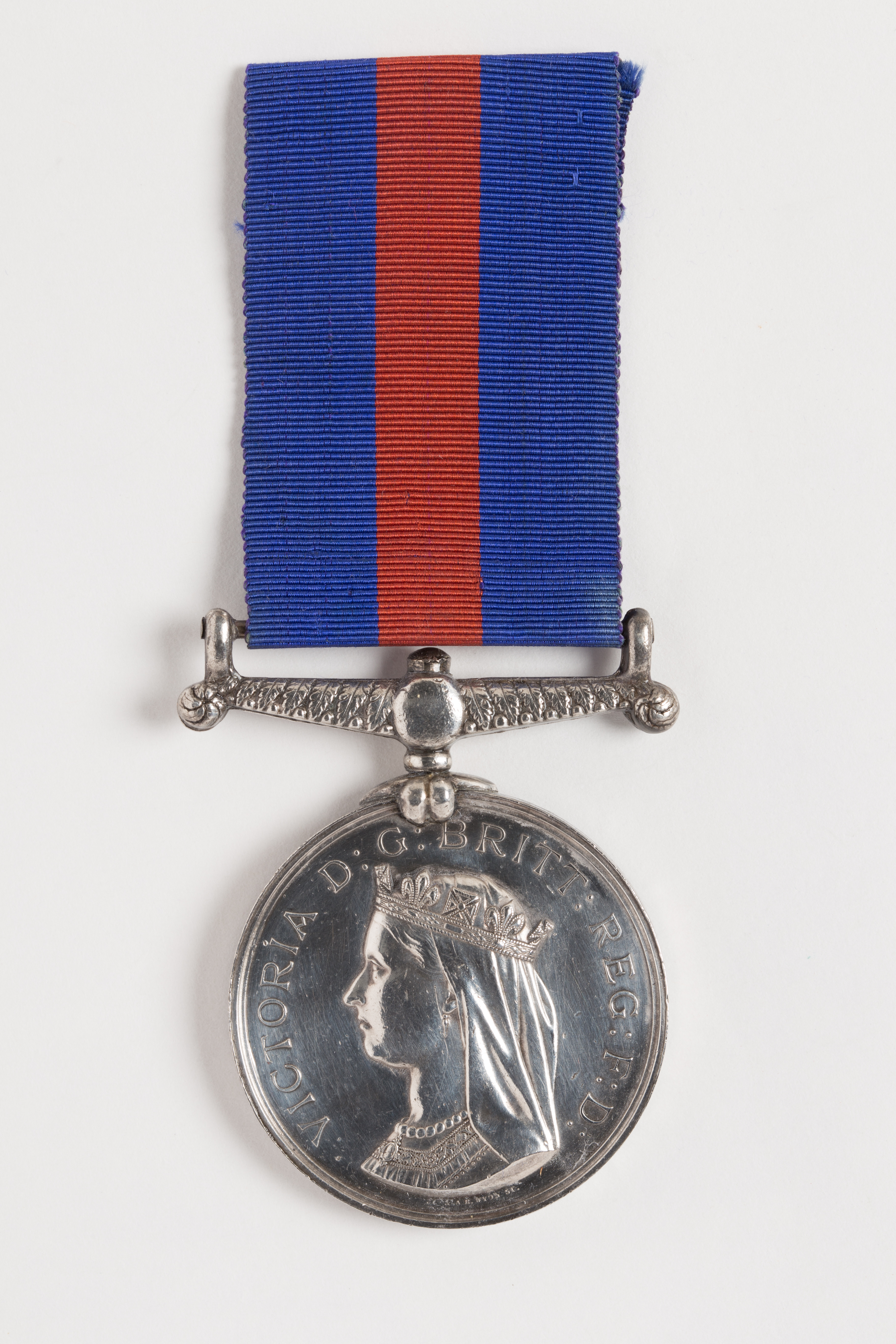
New Zealand Medal 1860-66 awarded to Captain Charles Pye, Colonial Defence Force

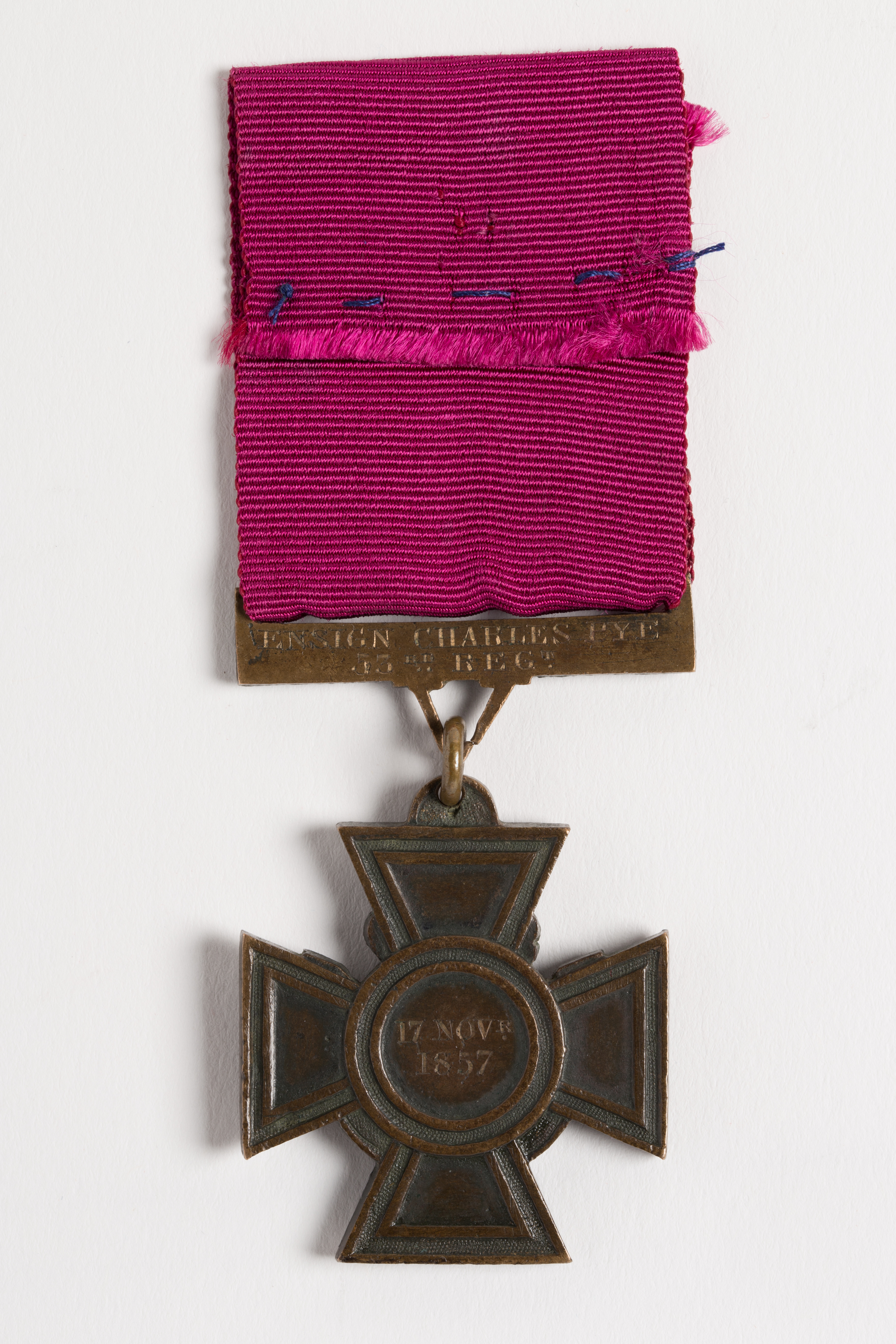
Reverse of Victoria Cross awarded to Charles Pye

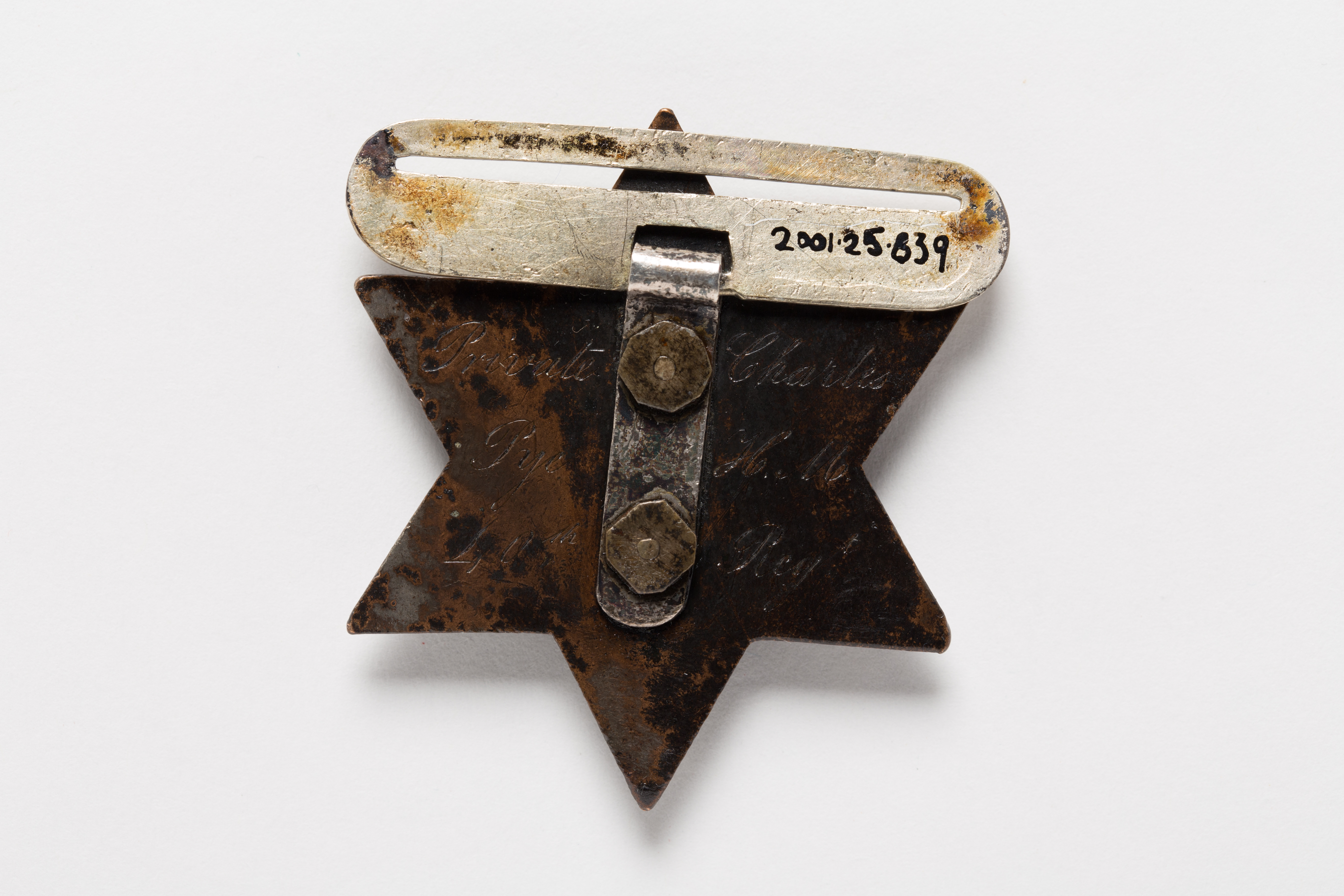
Reverse of Gwalior Campaign Star 29 December 1843 awarded to Private Charles Pye

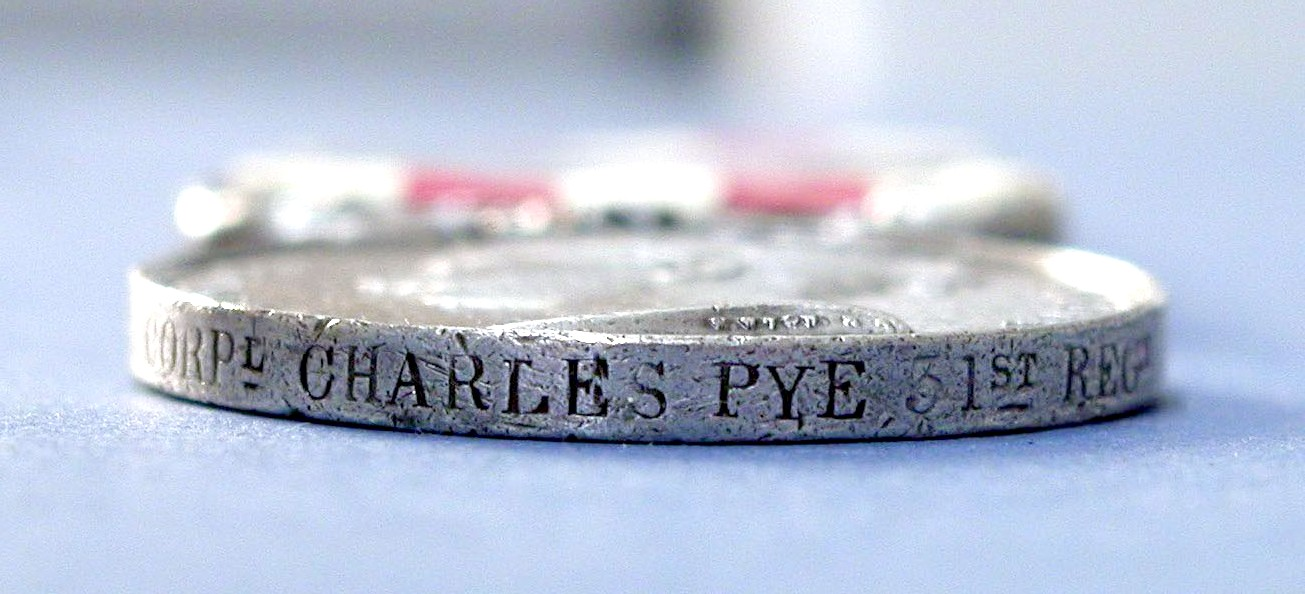
Engraving on Indian Mutiny Medal awarded to Ensign Charles Pye, 53rd Regiment

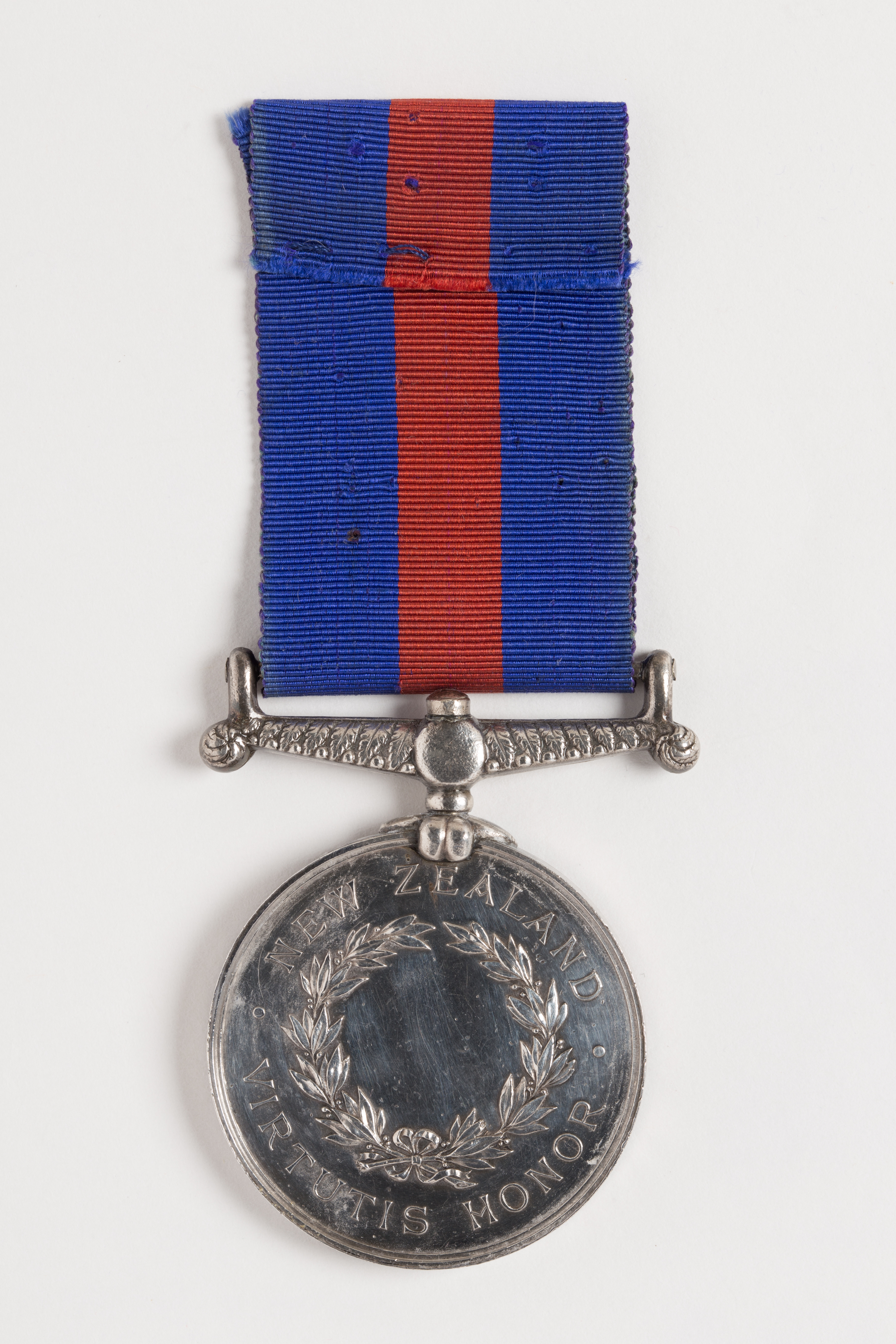
Reverse of New Zealand Medal 1860-66 awarded to Captain Charles Pye, Colonial Defence Force

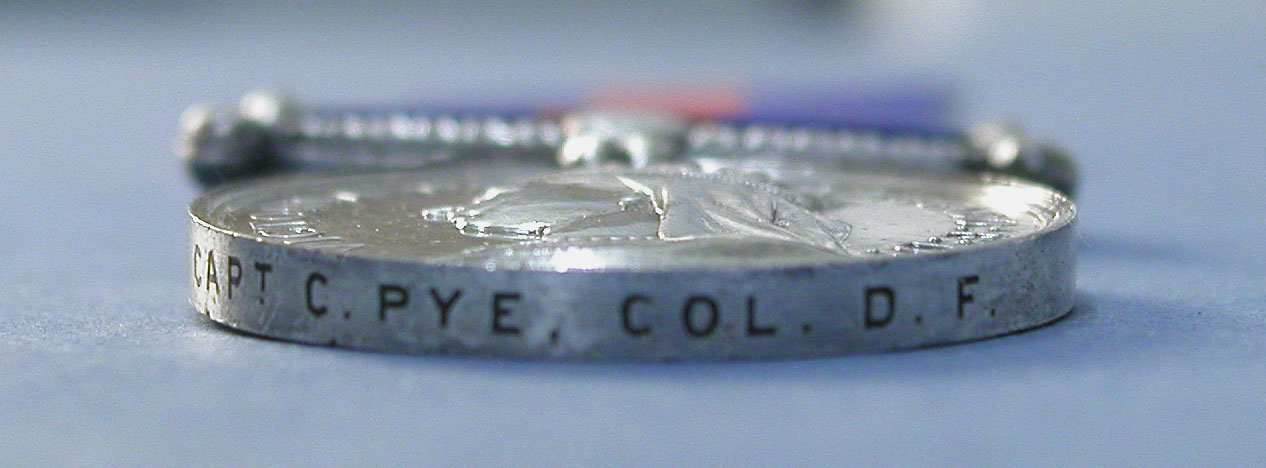
Engraving on New Zealand Medal 1860-66 awarded to Captain Charles Pye, Colonial Defence Force
