= Copthorne Barracks =

British Army military installation in England

- Copthorne, Shropshire
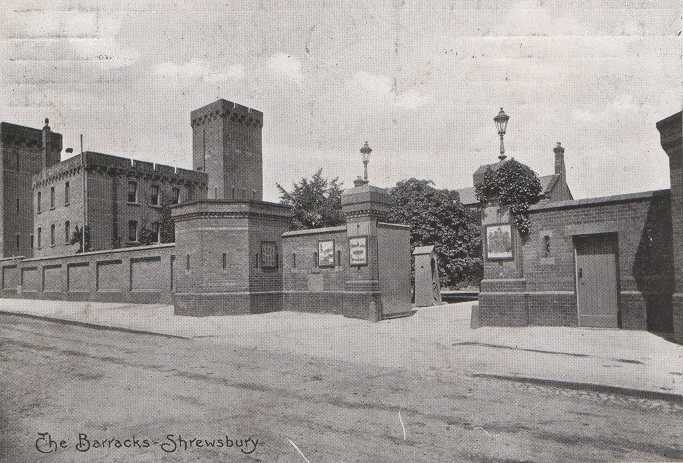
- Copthorne Barracks (1914)

Site information
- Type: Barracks
- Owner: Ministry of Defence
- Operator: British Army

Location
- Location within Shropshire
- Coordinates: 52°42′38″N 02°46′18″W

Site history
- Built: 1877–1881
- Built for: War Office
- In use: 1881-Present

Garrison information
- Occupants: E Company 8th Bn The Rifles; 202 (Midlands) Field Hospital.

Copthorne Barracks was a British Army military installation in Copthorne, a suburb of Shrewsbury in Shropshire, England.

== History ==
The barracks were built between 1877 and 1881 and initially included a hospital, married quarters, stabling and stores. Their creation took place as part of the Cardwell Reforms which encouraged the localisation of British military forces. The barracks became the depot for the 43rd (Monmouthshire) Regiment of Foot and the 53rd (Shropshire) Regiment of Foot. Following the Childers Reforms, the 53rd (Shropshire) Regiment of Foot amalgamated with the 85th Regiment of Foot (Bucks Volunteers) to form the King's Shropshire Light Infantry with its depot in the barracks in 1881.

The barracks went on to become the regional centre for infantry training as the Light Infantry Brigade Depot in 1960 and was referred to in that period as Sir John Moore Barracks.

In 1967 the West Midlands District was established with headquarters at Copthorne Barracks. In the early 1980s West Midlands District became "Western District". In 1991, the first three of the minor districts to be amalgamated were North West District, the former Western District and Wales, to form a new Wales and Western District. The enlarged district was disbanded on the formation of HQ Land Command in 1995, when Copthorne Barracks then became headquarters of the 5th Infantry Division from 1995 until the division was disbanded in 2012.

The King's Shropshire Light Infantry museum was first established at Copthorne Barracks but moved to Shrewsbury Castle in 1985. The name of the establishment reverted to Copthorne Barracks when Sir John Moore Barracks, Winchester opened in October 1986.

It was also the administrative headquarters of the British Army's regional 143 (West Midlands) Brigade which was successively a subordinate part of Western District, Wales and Western District and the 5th Division, until 11 Signal Brigade and 143 (West Midlands) Brigade amalgamated to form 11th Signal Brigade and Headquarters West Midlands in November 2014. Following the amalgamation, the staff moved to Venning Barracks at Donnington, Telford (11 Signal Brigade's base).

The barracks also remains the home of two Army Reserve units, E Company, 8th Battalion, The Rifles and 202 (Midlands) Field Hospital, whose drill halls are within its perimeter.

In November 2014, the Ministry of Defence declared the parts of the barracks left unused by the departure of the 143 Brigade surplus to requirements and officially put it up for sale. The exception is 0.193 hectares of land used by the Army Reserve Centre which will remain Ministry property.

In July 2016 the Defence Infrastructure Organisation applied for planning permission to Shropshire Council to demolish 40 buildings at the barracks while retaining boundary walls, prior to sale. The site was sold in May 2018 to builders Bellway Homes who in December 2018 gained approval from Shropshire Council to build 216 homes, and permission to begin demolition work to clear the site. Under this, the acquired buildings were entirely demolished apart from part of the 19th century 'Keep' which was retained for conversion to apartments. The development has been named Copthorne Keep.
