= Newtownbutler =

Village in County Fermanagh, Northern Ireland

Coordinates: 54.182°N 7.361°W

Newtownbutler: An Baile Nua / Achadh Gé
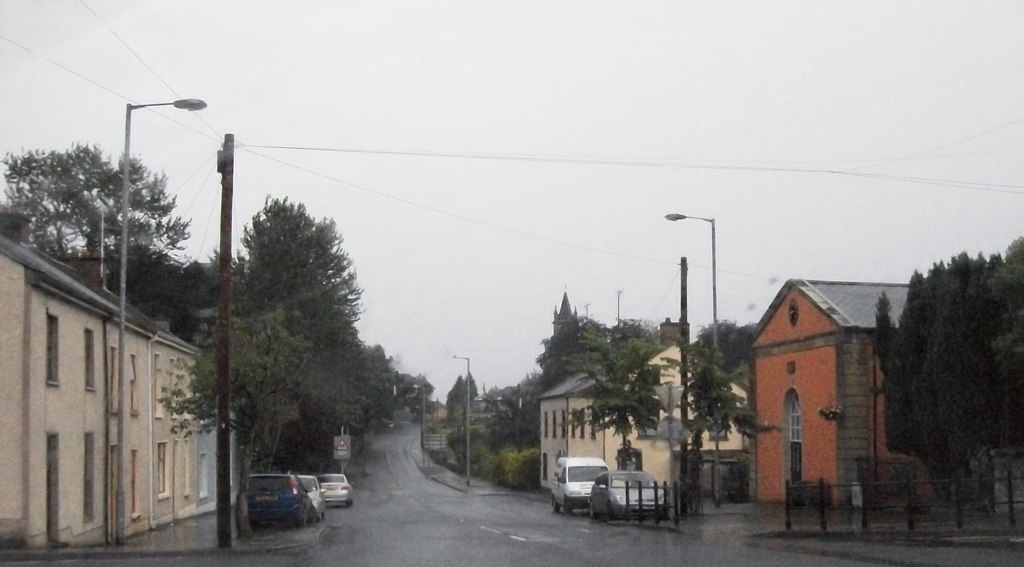
- Bridge Street

- Location within Northern Ireland
- Population: 972 (2021 census)
- District: Fermanagh and Omagh
- County: County Fermanagh
- Country: Northern Ireland
- Sovereign state: United Kingdom
- Postcode district: BT
- Dialling code: 028
- UK Parliament: Fermanagh and South Tyrone
- NI Assembly: Fermanagh and South Tyrone

Newtownbutler (also sometimes written as Newtown Butler or Newtown-Butler) is a village in the south-east of County Fermanagh in Northern Ireland. It is in the south-east corner of the county, being near Upper Lough Erne, the border with both County Monaghan and County Cavan, and the town of Clones. It is surrounded by small lakes and bogland. According to the 2021 census, it had a population of 972 people. The village is the largest settlement within the Barony of Coole.

== History ==
Newtownbutler began to be built as a Plantation village in the early 18th century. It was built within the townland of Aghagay (Irish: Achadh Gé).

The Battle of Newtownbutler took place nearby in 1689 during the Williamite War in Ireland.

=== The Troubles ===
There were 13 deaths in and around Newtownbutler during the Troubles.

== Amenities ==
Crom Castle and Estate lie on the shores of Upper Lough Erne, just 3 miles from Newtownbutler. The estate was established in the early 17th century during the Plantation of Ulster. Crom Estate is owned by the Crichton family, Earls of Erne and is leased to the National Trust for public use. The estate covers over 1,900 acres (8 km^{2}) of woods, parkland and wetland. Crom Estate is also one of the most important sites in Northern Ireland for bats, with all eight Northern Ireland species recorded on the estate.

The Crom Castle was built in 1820 in Victorian style, although Queen Victoria's reign began in 1837. The castle was designed by the English architect Edward Blore, who was also responsible for designing sections of Buckingham Palace.

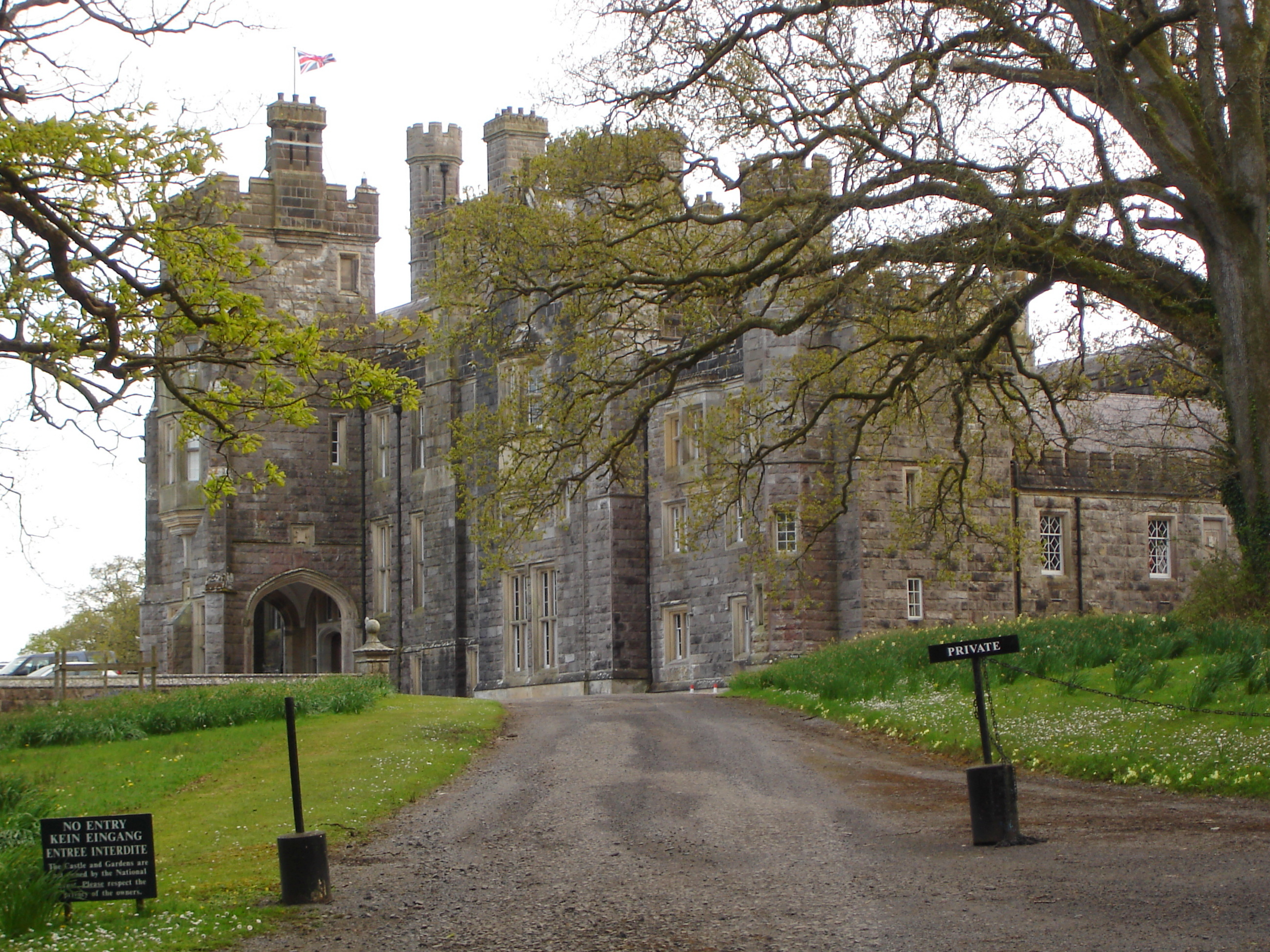
Crom Castle

The village currently has two pubs, The Rambling House and Mulligans Bar and Lounge. The Lanesborough Arms Hotel (formerly Reilly's Bar) was another well known public house in Newwtownbutler that was closed in 2004. The traditional bar was removed and transferred to the Ulster American Folk Park in Omagh. The village also has two supermarkets, two takeaways, a butchers, a chemists, a credit union, a church and parish hall, an Orange hall, a community centre, GAA grounds and a large community playpark.

== Notable people ==
- The Rev. William Thompson (1733–1799), the first president of the Methodist Conference after Wesley's death, was born in Newtownbutler.
- Charles Irwin (1824 – 8 April 1873) was born in Manorhamilton, County Leitrim, and was an Irish recipient of the Victoria Cross. During the Siege of Lucknow on 16 November 1857 at Lucknow, India, Private Irwin showed conspicuous bravery at the assault on the Secundra Bagh when, although severely wounded through the right shoulder, he was one of the first to enter the building under heavy fire. He died on 29 March 1873 at Newtownbutler and is buried in Saint Mark's Churchyard, Magheraveely, County Fermanagh.
- Father Constantine Scollen (4 April 1841 – 8 November 1902) was born just outside the village, on Galloon Island in Lough Erne. He became a famous missionary among the native peoples of North America and actually lived with the people of the Blackfoot Confederacy in Canada for almost a decade. He spent over thirty years on the prairies and died in Dayton, Ohio.

== Transport ==
Newtownbutler railway station opened on 26 June 1858 and was finally closed on 1 October 1957.

== Demographics ==
=== 2021 census ===
Residents could identify as more than one nationality.

National Identity of Newtownbutler area residents (2021)
Nationality	Per cent
British	18.7%
Irish	59.2%
Northern Irish	26.6%

On census day (2021) the usually resident population of Newtownbutler village and surrounding countryside was 3,039. This incorporates NISRA mapped areas Erne East F2, F3, F4, E4 and E5. Of these:

- 71.7% (2179) identified as Roman Catholic religion.
- 20.3% (617) identified as 'Protestant and Other Christian' religion.
- 7% (212) had no religious background.
- 0.42% (13) had an 'Other' religious background.
- 14% (431) indicated that they had a British only identity,
- 56% (1,704) had an Irish only identity
- 21% (635) had a Northern Irish only identity (respondents could indicate more than one national identity)

=== 2011 census ===
Newtownbutler is classified as a small village or hamlet by the Northern Ireland Statistics and Research Agency (NISRA) (i.e. with population between 500 and 1,000 people). On census day (27 March 2011) there were 989 people living in Newtownbutler. Of these:

- 20.9% were aged under 16 years and 13.8% were aged 60 and over
- 49% of the population were male and 51% were female
- 81.5% were from a Catholic background; 17% were from a Protestant background and 1.5% were from an Other background
- 19% indicated that they had a British national identity, 53.5% had an Irish national identity and 27.8% had a Northern Irish national identity.

== Sport ==
Newtownbutler is home to the Newtownbutler First Fermanaghs Gaelic football team. They play at all levels of football in both the men's and women's categories. Their last Fermanagh Senior Championship title came in 2007.

== Groups ==
=== Marching bands ===
According to the Ulster Bands Forum there are six marching bands operating in Newtownbutler Ward. Four are from Newtownbutler while the other two operate in the nearby village of Magheraveely. The four from Newtownbutler are: Feaugh Pipe Band; Loughkillygreen Accordion Band; Newtownbutler Flute Band; and Wattlebridge Accordion Band.

=== Orange lodges ===
According to the Grand Orange Lodge of Ireland, Newtownbutler District No.1 is the largest district in County Fermanagh with ten men's lodges and one women's lodge. The district covers the wards of Newtownbutler and Roslea. Five lodges operate within Newtownbutler and its immediate surrounding area. These are: LOL 184 Newtownbutler; LOL 391 Wattlebridge; LOL 854 Loughkillygreen; LOL 1219 Crom Castle; and LOL 1320 Feaugh.

There are also three Royal Black Preceptory lodges operating in the Newtownbutler area. They are: RBP 154 Newtownbutler; RBP 204 Loughkillygreen; RBP 811 Drummully

== See also ==
- Market houses in Northern Ireland
- Wattlebridge
