= Charles Irwin (VC) =

Irish recipient of the Victoria Cross

- Born: c. 1824; Manorhamilton, County Leitrim, Ireland
- Died: 8 April 1873 (aged 48–49); Newtownbutler, County Fermanagh, Ireland
- Burial place: Saint Mark's Churchyard, Magheraveely, County Fermanagh
- Military career
- Allegiance: United Kingdom
- Branch: British Army
- Rank: Private
- Units: 18th Regiment of Foot; 53rd Regiment of Foot; 87th Regiment of Foot
- Conflicts: Second Anglo-Burmese War; Indian Mutiny
- Awards: Victoria Cross

Charles Irwin, VC (c. 1824 – 8 April 1873), was born in Manorhamilton, County Leitrim, and was an Irish recipient of the Victoria Cross, the highest and most prestigious award for gallantry in the face of the enemy that can be awarded to British and Commonwealth forces.

== Details ==
Irwin was approximately 33 years old, and a private in the 53rd Regiment of Foot (later The King's Shropshire Light Infantry), British Army during the Indian Mutiny when the following deed took place on 16 November 1857 at the Relief of Lucknow for which he was awarded the VC:

53rd Regiment, Private C. Irwin.

Date of Act of Bravery, 16th November, 1857

For conspicuous bravery at the assault of the Secundra Bagh, at Lucknow, on the 16th of November, 1857. Although severely wounded through the right shoulder, he was one of the first men of the 53rd Regiment, who entered the buildings under a very severe fire. Elected by the private soldiers of the Regiment.

== Further information ==
Service Record:

- 18th Regiment of Foot
- 3168 53rd Shropshire Regiment
- 87th Regiment of Foot between Jan 1860 – 30 June 1860.

His entry in the Canon Lummis files states that: "Judging from numerous entries in the muster roles as to imprisonment, he appears to have been a bad hat."

He died on 8 April 1873 at Newtownbutler, County Fermanagh, Ireland, and was buried in Saint Mark's Churchyard (Aghadrumsee), near Magheraveely in the south-east of County Fermanagh.

== Medal ==
His Victoria Cross is displayed at The King's Shropshire Light Infantry Museum at Shrewsbury Castle.
