= James Stokes (VC) =

Recipient of the Victoria Cross

- Born: 6 February 1915; Hutchesontown, Glasgow
- Died: 1 March 1945 (aged 30); Kervenheim, Rhineland, Germany
- Burial place: Reichswald Forest War Cemetery, near Kleve
- Military career
- Allegiance: United Kingdom
- Branch: British Army
- Service years: 1943 - 1945
- Rank: Private
- Service number: 1592376
- Units: King's Shropshire Light Infantry
- Conflicts: World War II: Western Allied invasion of Germany †
- Awards: Victoria Cross

Private James Stokes VC (6 February 1915 – 1 March 1945) was a British Army soldier and a Scottish recipient of the Victoria Cross, the highest and most prestigious award for gallantry in the face of the enemy that can be awarded to British and Commonwealth forces.

== Details ==
Stokes was 30 years old, and a private in the 2nd Battalion, King's Shropshire Light Infantry, British Army during the Second World War. He was killed in action on 1 March 1945, in Kervenheim, Rhineland, Germany where his actions earned him the Victoria Cross. In Germany, on 1st March, 1945, during an attack on Kervenheim, Private Stokes was a member of the leading section of a platoon pinned down by heavy fire from a farm building. Without waiting for orders Private Stokes dashed through the enemy fire, to disappear inside this building. The fire stopped, and he reappeared, wounded in the neck, bringing with him twelve prisoners. This valiant action enabled the platoon to advance to the next objective. Private Stokes was ordered back to a Regimental Aid Post, but refused to go. The platoon then encountered heavy fire from a house on the left. Again without waiting for orders, Private Stokes rushed the house by himself and all firing from it ceased. His gallantry enabled his platoon, which he subsequently rejoined bringing five more prisoners, to continue the advance. In the final assault Private Stokes, now severely wounded, once more dashed to the objective through intense fire. He finally fell, firing his rifle to the last. It was found that he had been wounded eight times in the upper part of the body. Private Stokes's one object throughout this action was to kill the enemy, at whatever personal risk. His magnificent courage, devotion to duty, and splendid example inspired all around him, and ensured the success of the attack at a critical moment; moreover, his self-sacrifice saved his Platoon and Company heavy casualties.
