= Charles Trollope =

British Army general

General Sir Charles Trollope KCB
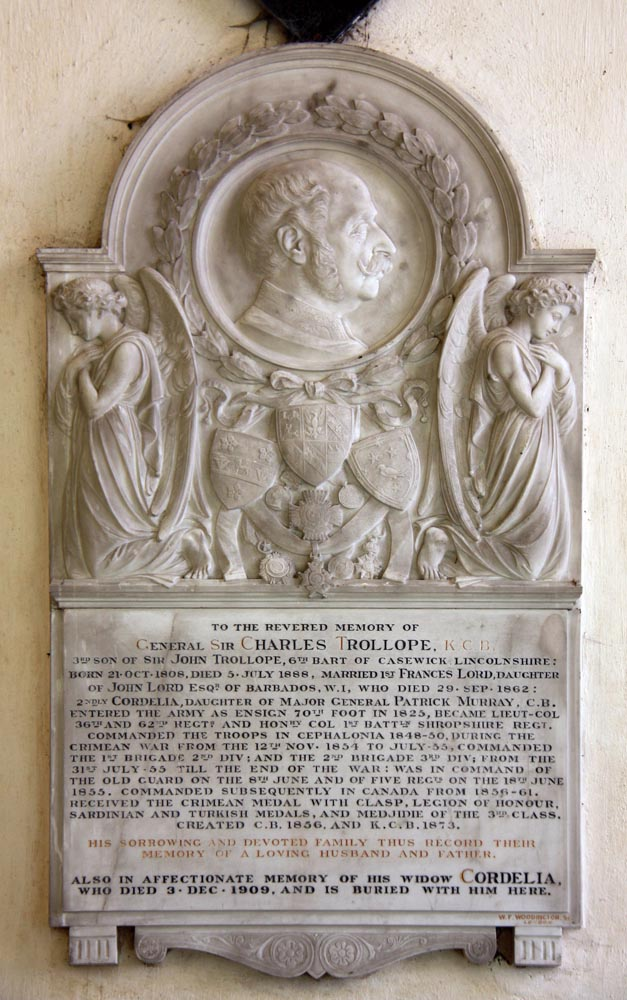
- Funerary monument, Uffington church
- Born: 21 October 1808
- Died: 5 July 1888 (aged 79)
- Military career
- Allegiance: United Kingdom
- Branch: British Army
- Rank: General
- Conflicts: Crimean War
- Awards: Knight Commander of the Order of the Bath

General Sir Charles Trollope KCB (21 October 1808 – 5 July 1888) was a British Army officer who served as colonel of the 1st Battalion King's Shropshire Light Infantry.

== Military career ==
Trollope was commissioned as an ensign in the 17th Regiment of Foot on 19 November 1825. After serving in the West Indies and in New Brunswick, he became commanding officer of the reserve battalion and was deployed to Cephalonia defending the island from insurgents between 1848 and 1850. He transferred to the command of the 62nd Regiment of Foot in April 1852 and commanded the 1st Brigade in the 2nd Division and then the 2nd Brigade in the 3rd Division during the Crimean War. He became colonel of the 53rd Regiment in December 1868 and colonel of the 1st Battalion King's Shropshire Light Infantry in July 1881.

There is a memorial to Trollope at St Michael and All Angels' Church at Uffington in Lincolnshire.

== Family ==
Trollope was married twice. Firstly to Frances Lord who died in 1862. Secondly to Cordelia Murray who survived him, dying in 1909.
