= Magheraveely =

Village in County Fermanagh, Northern Ireland

Coordinates: 54°11′49″N 7°17′8″W

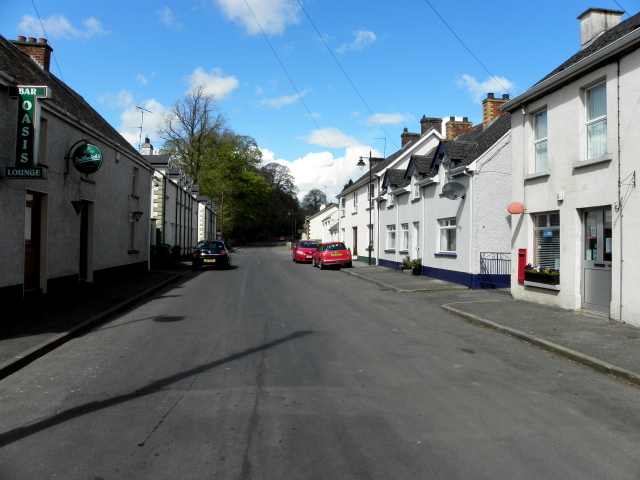
- Main Street

- Location within Northern Ireland
- Population: 254 (2001 Census)
- District: Fermanagh and Omagh
- County: County Fermanagh
- Country: Northern Ireland
- Sovereign state: United Kingdom
- Postcode district: BT92
- Dialling code: 028
- UK Parliament: Fermanagh and South Tyrone
- NI Assembly: Fermanagh and South Tyrone

Magheraveely (from Irish Machaire Mhílic) is a small village in County Fermanagh, Northern Ireland. In the 2001 Census, it had a population of people 254. It is within the Fermanagh and Omagh District Council area. The village is 3 miles (5 km) north-east of Newtownbutler, and 2.5 miles (4 km) north-west of Clones, County Monaghan.

== History ==
In 1820, Magheraveely used to lie on the main road to Dublin (Lisnaskea, Ballagh Cross, Magheraveely). It was once a busy business hub for the local community.

In 1841 the population was 74. Petty sessions were held in Magheraveely before the Courthouse in Newtownbutler was built.

== People ==
Charles Irwin (1824–1873) was born in Manorhamilton, County Leitrim, and was an Irish recipient of the Victoria Cross (VC). He is buried in Saint Mark's Churchyard, Aghadrumsee.

== Crozier family ==
Gortra House is situated midway between Magheraveely and Newtownbutler. The Crozier family formerly lived at Cloncarn and Springtown, County Fermanagh. In the graveyard on the edge of the village is the Burial Vault of the Crozier family of Gortra House. It was built by John Crozier of Gortra House (born 1765 died 1814) and contains the remains of that family until 1933.

== Amenities ==
The village currently has a pub named The Oasis Bar and BBQ, a Post Office, and Fitzpatrick's Services located 1 mile from the village that includes a supermarket, hardware store and fuel station.

== Demographics ==
=== 2021 census ===
Residents could identify as more than one nationality.

National Identity of some* of Magheraveely area residents (2021)
Nationality	Per cent
British	32.2%
Irish	48.5%
Northern Irish	30.2%

On Census Day (2021) according to NISRA results the usually resident population of Erne East E4 that incorporates half of Magheraveely village and a large area of the surrounding countryside was 602. The remainder of Magheraveely village and countryside falls under the larger Erne East E5 ward. This makes determining the exact population and makeup of Magheraveely difficult as some areas not usually associated with the village are included in these figures. Figures shown are from Erne East E4 ward only and are not fully representative of the Magheraveely population.

- 53.3% (321) identified as Roman Catholic religion.
- 38.7% (233) identified as 'Protestant and Other Christian' religion.
- 8% (48) had no religious background.
- 0% (0) had an 'Other' religious background.
- 23% (138) indicated that they had a British only identity,
- 43.5% (262) had an Irish only identity
- 18% (110) had a Northern Irish only identity

== Organisations ==
Magheraveely hosts two Orange Lodges, Magheraveely Loyal Orange Lodge 467 sit in Magheraveely Orange Hall on the edge of the village. While Knox Loyal Orange Lodge 1841 meet in their Orange Hall less than a mile away. Both lodges have been active for over 100 years and are two of ten men's lodges that makeup Newtownbutler District No.1.

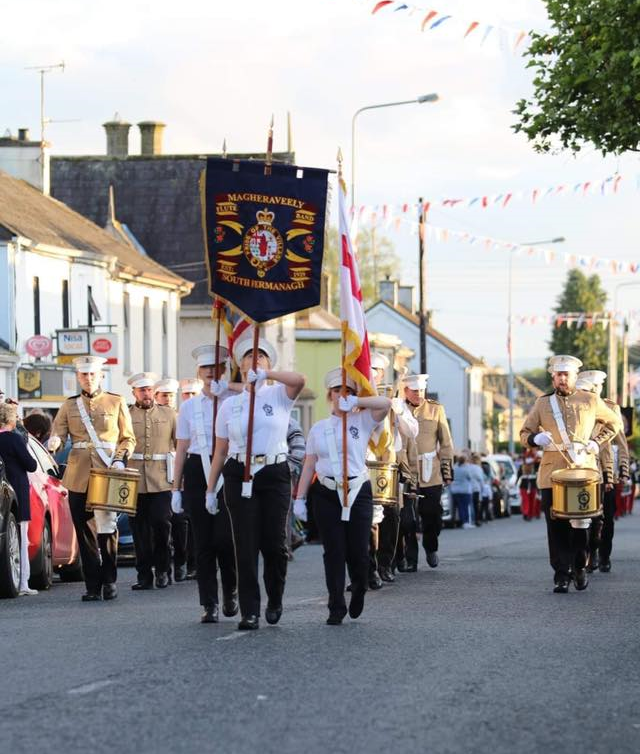
Magheraveely Flute Band

Magheraveely Flute Band was formed in 1929 by nine local men who had fought together in World War 1. Following their return from active service, they decided to form a marching band to accompany Magheraveely LOL 467. The band practices in the village's Orange Hall and is a popular cultural outlet in the local area. The band host a large successful competition parade each June in the village that attracts some 30 marching bands and hundreds of spectators. The second band from the village is the Knox Pipe Band who practice in Knox Orange Hall just outside the village and they too host a successful longstanding annual parade and BBQ each Summer.

Founded April 2011, Magheraveely FC play in Division 1 of the Fermanagh & Western League with the reserves playing in Reserve Division 1. The team's current home ground is located in the nearby town of Clones in County Monaghan, where the team both train and play their competitive games.

In 2015 the Magheraveely Community Development Association (MCDA) regrouped and got straight to work organising a vintage and modern tractor run, along with a family fun day which was followed by a BBQ and live music in the Oasis Bar and Lounge. The event was extremely successful and the group continues to organise events and offer opportunities for the local area.

== Education ==
There was a formerly a school in the townland of Midhill called 'Magheraveeley National School', known by locals as 'Midhill Country School'.

Children of the village typically attend schools located in the nearby village of Newtownbutler or townland of Aghadrumsee.
