= 53rd (Shropshire) Regiment of Foot =

53rd Regiment of Foot
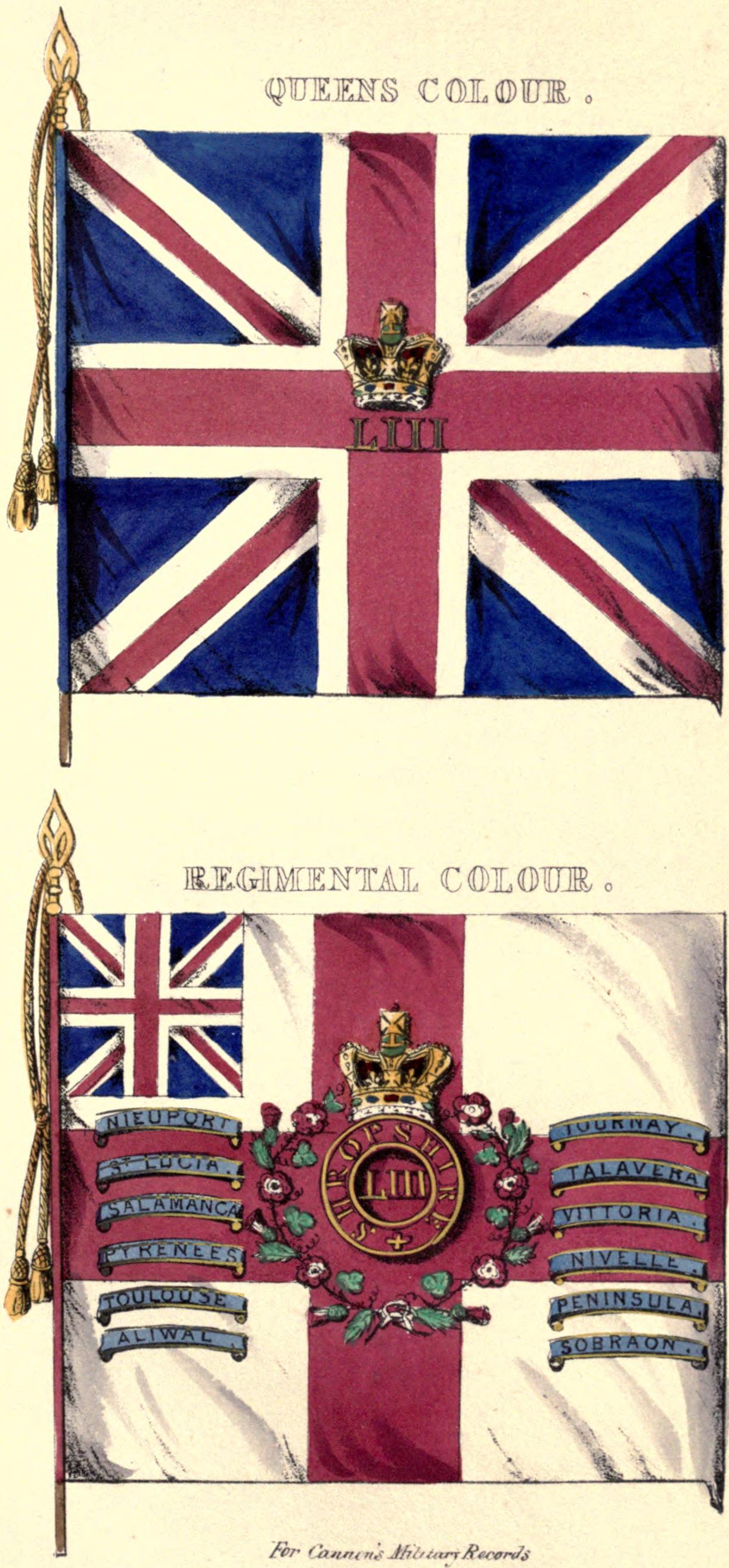
- Colours of the 53rd Regiment
- Active: 1755–1881
- Country: Kingdom of Great Britain (1755–1800); United Kingdom (1801–1881)
- Branch: British Army
- Type: Infantry
- Size: One battalion (two battalions 1803–1817)
- Garrison/HQ: Copthorne Barracks, Shrewsbury
- Nicknames: "Old Five & Threepennies" "Brickdusts" "Red Regiment"
- Colors: Red Facings
- Engagements: American Revolutionary War; French Revolutionary Wars; Napoleonic Wars; First Anglo-Sikh War; Second Anglo-Sikh War; Indian Rebellion

Commanders
- Notable commanders: William Whitmore; Sir John Abercromby

The 53rd (Shropshire) Regiment of Foot was a British Army regiment, raised in 1755. Under the Childers Reforms it amalgamated with the 85th (King's Light Infantry) Regiment of Foot to form the King's Shropshire Light Infantry in 1881.

== History ==
=== Early history ===
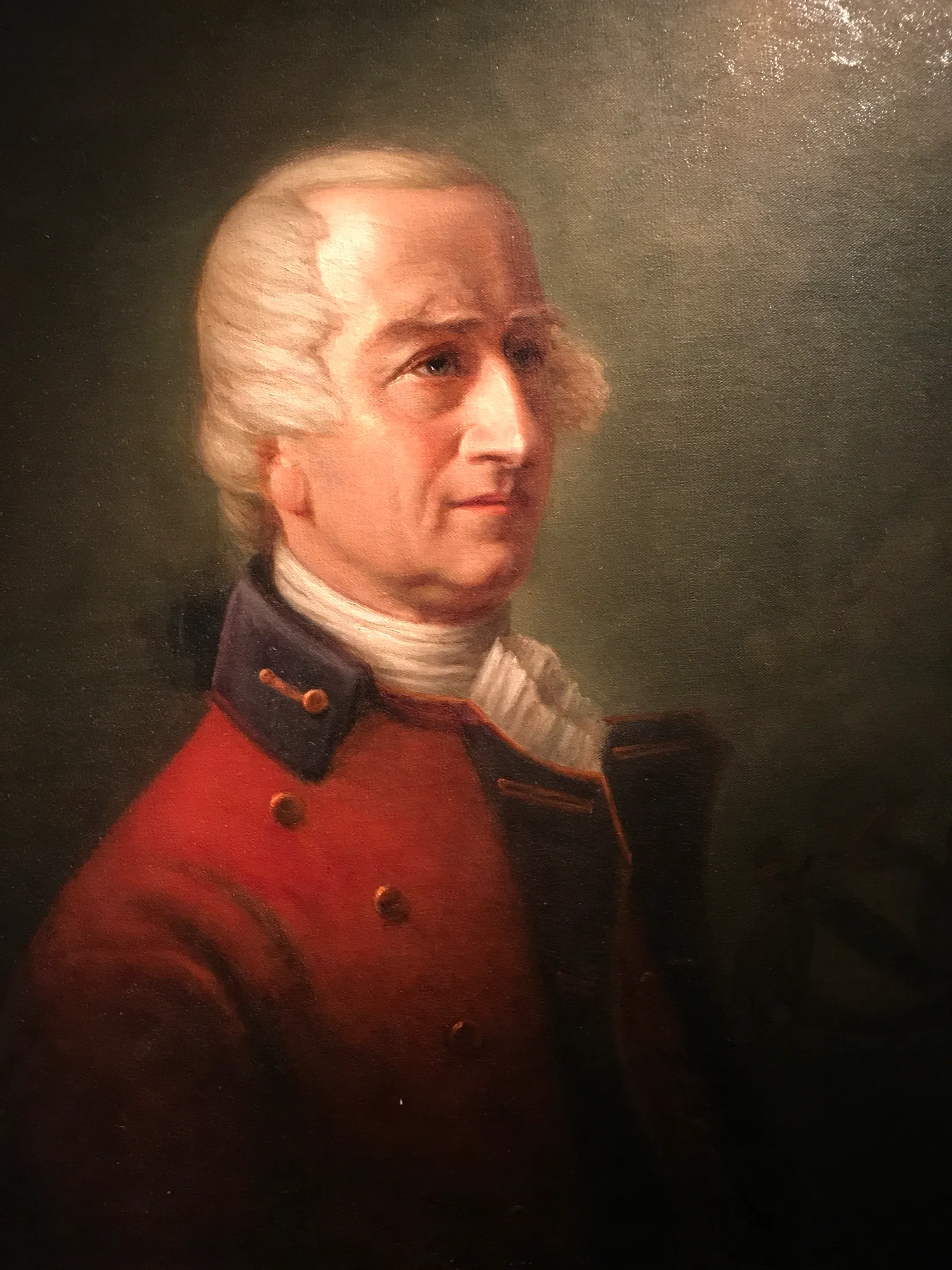
Sir Guy Carleton, Governor of the Province of Quebec 1768–1778

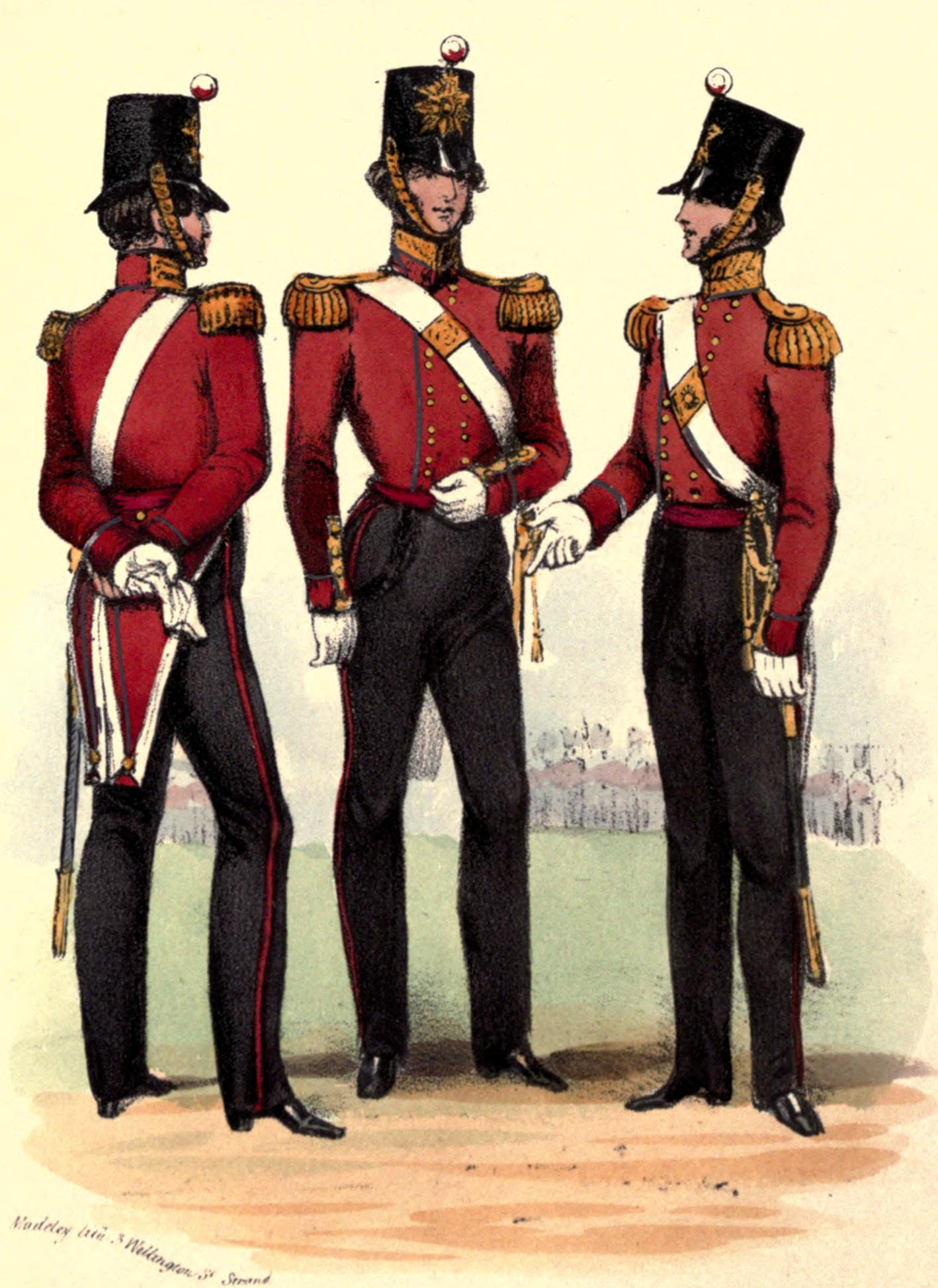
Regimental uniform, 1840s

The regiment was raised in Northern England by Colonel William Whitmore as the 55th Regiment of Foot for service in the Seven Years' War. It was re-ranked as the 53rd Regiment of Foot, following the disbandment of the existing 50th and 51st regiments, in 1756. The regiment embarked for Gibraltar in 1756 and, after returning home, moved to Ireland in 1768.

=== American Revolutionary War ===
The regiment departed Ireland for North America in April 1776 and arrived at Quebec City in May 1776 to help raise the siege of the city by Continental Army troops during the American Revolutionary War. It served under Sir Guy Carleton at the Battle of Trois-Rivières in June 1776 and the Battle of Valcour Island in October 1776. Its flank companies (grenadier and light infantry) were with General John Burgoyne during the ill-fated Saratoga campaign. Men from the other eight companies served under Major Christopher Carleton of the 29th Regiment of Foot during Carleton's Raid in 1778 and during the Burning of the Valleys campaign in 1780. Lieutenant Richard Houghton of the 53rd led the Royalton raid in 1780 burning three towns in eastern Vermont. In 1782 the regiment adopted a county designation and became the 53rd (the Shropshire) Regiment of Foot. The regiment returned to England in 1789.

=== Napoleonic Wars ===
In March 1793 the regiment embarked for Flanders for service in the French Revolutionary Wars. The regiment saw action at the Battle of Famars in May 1793, the Siege of Valenciennes in June 1793 and the Siege of Dunkirk in August 1793. It also took part in the Siege of Nieuwpoort in October 1793, the Siege of Landrecies in April 1794 and the Battle of Tournay in May 1794. The regiment returned to England in spring 1795 but then embarked for the West Indies in November 1795 where it took part in the capture of Saint Lucia in May 1796. It also helped suppress an insurrection by caribs on Saint Vincent in June 1796; expeditions to Trinidad and Puerto Rico followed in February 1797 and April 1797 respectively. The regiment returned home in 1802.

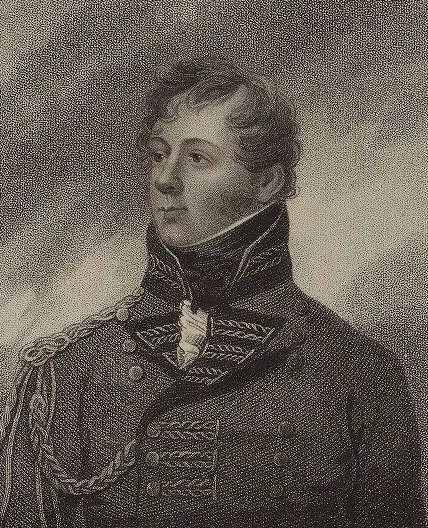
Major-General Rollo Gillespie who died leading the British troops at the Battle of Nalapani in October 1814

A second battalion was raised in 1803. The 1st battalion left for India in April 1805 where it undertook a punitive expedition to the Fortress of Callinger in Allahabad Province in February 1812. It also helped secure a pyrrhic victory at the Battle of Nalapani in October 1814 during the Anglo-Nepalese War. The 1st battalion also took part in engagements against Pindari forces in 1817 during the Third Anglo-Maratha War and did not return home until July 1823.

Meanwhile, the 2nd battalion embarked for Portugal for service in the Peninsular War in March 1809. It took part in the Second Battle of Porto in May 1809 and the Battle of Talavera in July 1809 before falling back to the Lines of Torres Vedras. It then fought at the Blockade of Almeida in April 1811, the Battle of Fuentes de Oñoro in May 1811 and the Battle of Almaraz in May 1812 as well as the Battle of Salamanca in July 1812, the Siege of Burgos in September 1812 and the Battle of Vitoria in June 1813. The battalion then pursued the French Army into France and fought at the Battle of the Pyrenees in July 1813, the Siege of San Sebastián in autumn 1813 and the Battle of Nivelle in November 1813 as well as the Battle of Toulouse in April 1814. The battalion returned home in July 1814. In August 1815 the 2nd battalion accompanied Napoleon into his exile on the island of Saint Helena. It returned home in September 1817 and was disbanded at Canterbury in October 1817.

=== The Victorian era ===
In July 1844 the regiment returned to India where it saw action at the Battle of Aliwal in January 1846 and the Battle of Sobraon in February 1846 during the First Anglo-Sikh War as well as the Battle of Gujrat in February 1849 during the Second Anglo-Sikh War. It also took part in the Siege of Cawnpore in June 1857, the Relief of Lucknow in November 1857 and the Capture of Lucknow in spring 1858 during the Indian Rebellion. Five members of the regiment were awarded Victoria Crosses during the rebellion. The regiment returned to England in 1860 and was garrisoned for the next four years in Aldershot, Plymouth and Portsmouth. In 1864 it moved to Curragh Camp and subsequently to other locations in Ireland. With the Fenian Brotherhood threatening from the United States, the regiment departed Ireland for Canada, arriving in Quebec in August 1866, subsequently garrisoning London for the next 2 years. In 1868 it occupied the Quebec Citadel, and finally departed Canada for Barbados in 1870.

As part of the Cardwell Reforms of the 1870s, where single-battalion regiments were linked together to share a single depot and recruiting district in the United Kingdom, the 53rd was linked with the 43rd (Monmouthshire) Regiment of Foot, and assigned to district no. 21 at Copthorne Barracks in Shrewsbury. On 1 July 1881 the Childers Reforms came into effect and the regiment amalgamated with the 85th Regiment of Foot (Bucks Volunteers) to form the King's Shropshire Light Infantry.

== In popular culture ==
The 53rd regiment is commemorated in A. E. Housman's poem '1887', from A Shropshire Lad.

== Battle honours ==
The regiment's battle honours were as follows:

- Nieuport 1793 Flanders Campaign
- Tournay 1794 Flanders Campaign
- St Lucia 1796 West Indies
- Talavera 1809 (2nd Battn.) Peninsular War
- Salamanca 1812 (2nd Battn.) Peninsular War
- Vittoria 1813 (2nd Battn.) Peninsular War
- Pyrenees 1813 (2nd Battn.) Peninsular War
- Nivelle 1813 (2nd Battn.) Peninsular War
- Toulouse 1814 (2nd Battn.) Peninsular War
- Peninsula 1809–1814 (2nd Battn.) Peninsular War
- Aliwal 1846 1st Sikh War (Sutlej campaign)
- Sobraon 1846 1st Sikh War (Sutlej campaign)
- Goojerat 1849 2nd Sikh War (Punjab Campaign)
- Punjab 1848–49
- Lucknow 1857–58 Indian Mutiny

== Victoria Crosses ==
Victoria Crosses awarded to men of the regiment were:

- Corporal Denis Dynon, Indian Mutiny (2 October 1857)
- Lieutenant Alfred Kirke Ffrench, Indian Mutiny (16 November 1857)
- Private Charles Irwin, Indian Mutiny (16 November 1857)
- Private James Kenny, Indian Mutiny (16 November 1857)
- Sergeant Major Charles Pye, Indian Mutiny (17 November 1857)

== Colonels ==
Colonels of the Regiment were:

=== 53rd Regiment of Foot ===
- 1755: Lt-Gen William Whitmore
- 1759: Major-Gen John Toovey
- 1770: Gen Robert Dalrymple-Horn-Elphinstone

=== 53rd (Shropshire) Regiment of Foot ===
- 1794: Gen Gerard Lake
- 1796–1797: Major-Gen Welbore Ellis Doyle
- 1798: Gen Charles Crosbie
- 1807: Lt-Gen Hon. John Abercromby, GCB
- 1817: Gen Rowland Lord Hill
- 1830: F.M. Lord Fitzroy James Henry Somerset, GCB
- 1854: Gen Sir John MacDonald, KCB
- 1855: Lt-Gen William Sutherland
- 1860: Gen Frederick Maunsell
- 1865: Major-Gen Charles William Ridley, CB
- 1867: Lt-Gen. William George Gold
- 1868: Gen. Sir Charles Trollope, KCB

== Sources ==
- Cannon, Richard (1849). Historical Record of the Fifty-Third, or the Shropshire Regiment of Foot. London: Parker, Furnivall and Parker.
- Smallman, David L. (2003). Quincentenary: A Story of St Helena, 1502–2002. Hypatia Publications. ISBN 978-1-872229-47-8.
- Smith, Justin H (1907). Our Struggle for the Fourteenth Colony, vol 2. New York: G.P. Putnam's Sons. OCLC 259236.
