= Sir Henry de Bathe, 4th Baronet =

British Army general (1823–1907)

General Sir Henry de Bathe Bt KCB
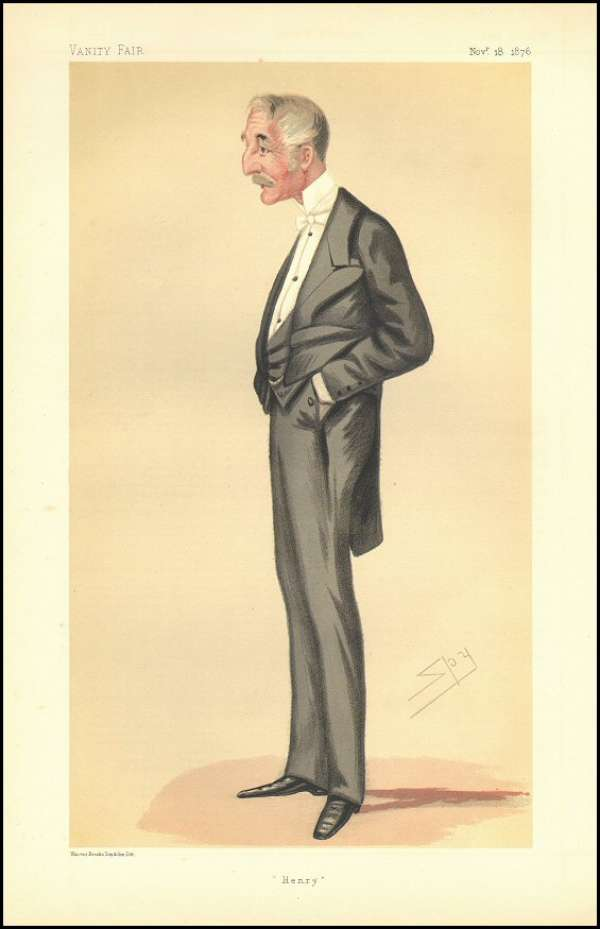
- Sir Henry Percival de Bathe, by Spy, published in Vanity Fair, 18 November 1876
- Born: 19 June 1823; Valletta, Malta
- Died: 5 January 1907 (aged 83); Chichester, West Sussex, England
- Military career
- Allegiance: United Kingdom
- Branch: British Army
- Rank: General
- Commands: Northern District
- Conflicts: Crimean War
- Awards: Knight Commander of the Order of the Bath

General Sir Henry Percival de Bathe, 4th Baronet, KCB (19 June 1823 – 5 January 1907) was a British Army officer who achieved high office in the 1870s.

== Early life ==
Bathe was born in Valletta, Malta in 1823, the son of Sir William Plunkett de Bathe, the 3rd Baronet. In 1838 he was a page at the Coronation of Queen Victoria.

== Military career ==
Bathe was commissioned into the Scots Fusilier Guards in 1839 and served in the Crimean War, during which he was second-in-command of his battalion at the Siege of Sevastopol. He was also present at the Battle of Traktir Bridge as aide-de-camp to Lord Rokeby. He was appointed commanding officer of the Scots Guards in 1864.

He inherited his baronetcy in 1870. In 1874 he was appointed general officer commanding the Northern District and in 1876, he was promoted to lieutenant general. He was promoted again to general in 1879 and retired in 1883.

In 1880 Bathe was appointed honorary colonel of the 85th, or The King's Regiment of Light Infantry (Bucks Volunteers), transferring after the 1881 amalgamation to be colonel of the 2nd Battalion, Kings Shropshire Light Infantry. He was a justice of the peace and a Deputy Lieutenant for County Meath, and also a justice of the peace for Sussex.

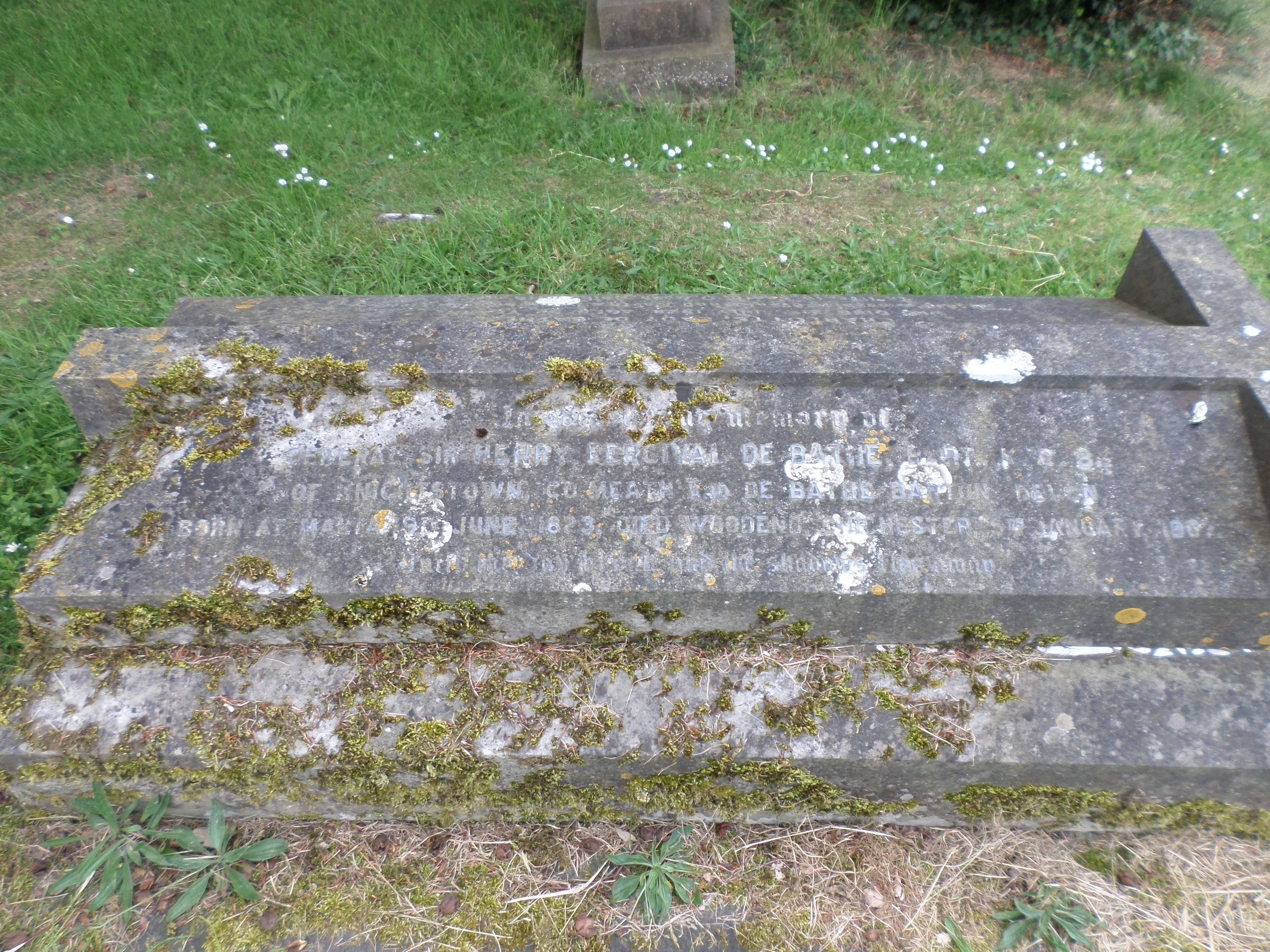
Grave of Sir Henry Percival de Bathe and his wife Charlotte

== Family ==
Bathe's father died in March 1870, and this removed the final objection to his marrying Charlotte Clare, with whom he had been living for about thirteen years out of wedlock. They had seven children before the wedding, and in February 1928 four of these children submitted a petition to the High Court of Justice for declarations of legitimacy under the Legitimacy Act, 1926. They were Viscountess Burnham, Lady Somerleyton, Mrs Winifred McCalmont and Maximilian John de Bathe. The 90-year-old Dowager, Lady de Bathe, confirmed the facts in an affidavit, and the petition was granted. Hugo Gerald de Bathe was their first son born in wedlock (1871) and remained the heir to the baronetcy despite the legitimation of his older brother.

Bathe lived at Wood End, near Chichester, where he died on 5 January 1907, aged 83. He and his wife are buried together in the graveyard of St Andrew's Church, West Stoke. Their eldest daughter, Mary Archdale, is buried close to them.

Military offices
Preceded by Daniel Lysons	GOC Northern District; 1874–1878	Succeeded by George Willis
Baronetage of the United Kingdom
Preceded by William de Bathe	Baronet (of Knightstown); 1870–1907	Succeeded by Hugo de Bathe
