= 85th Regiment of Foot (Bucks Volunteers) =

- Active: 1793 - 1881
- Country: Kingdom of Great Britain (1793–1800); United Kingdom (1801–1881)
- Branch: British Army
- Type: Infantry
- Size: One battalion (two battalions 1800–1802)
- Garrison/HQ: Cowley Barracks, Oxford
- Nicknames: The Young Bucks; The Elegant Extracts
- Engagements: War of 1812; Battle of Bladensburg; French Revolutionary Wars; Napoleonic Wars; Second Anglo-Afghan War

The 85th (Bucks Volunteers) Regiment of Foot was a British Army line infantry regiment, raised in 1793. Under the Childers Reforms it amalgamated with the 53rd (Shropshire) Regiment of Foot to form the King's Shropshire Light Infantry in 1881.

== History ==
=== Formation ===
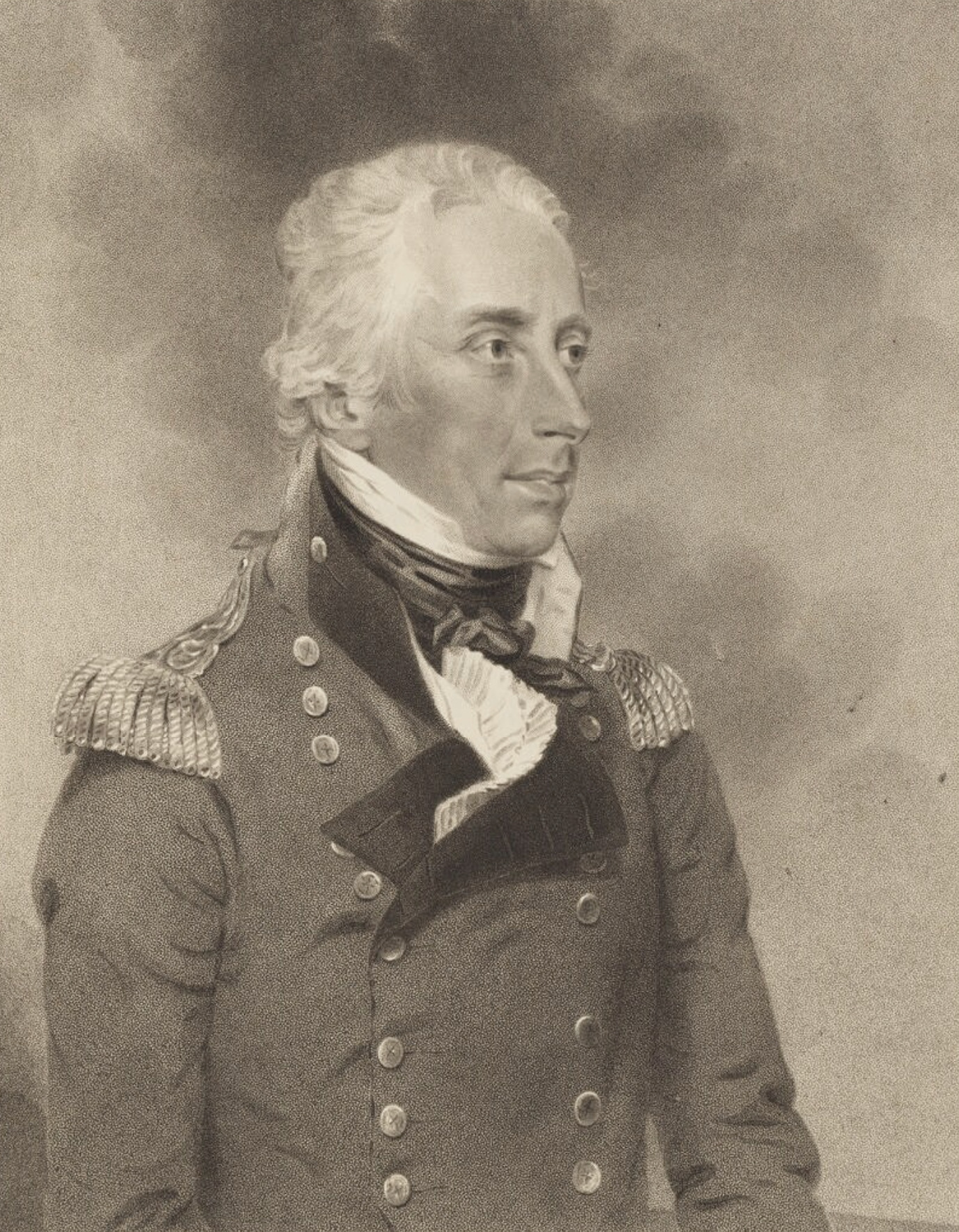
George Nugent, the regiment's founder

The regiment was raised in Buckinghamshire by Lieutenant-Colonel George Nugent as the 85th Regiment of Foot, in response to the threat posed by the French Revolution, on 18 November 1793. The regiment was sent to join the Duke of York's army in the Netherlands in 1794 as part of the unsuccessful defence of that country against the Republican French during the Flanders Campaign. It was posted to Gibraltar in 1795 and returned home in 1797. It embarked for the Netherlands again in August 1799 and saw action at the Battle of Alkmaar and the Battle of Castricum in October 1799 during the Anglo-Russian invasion of Holland.

=== Napoleonic Wars ===
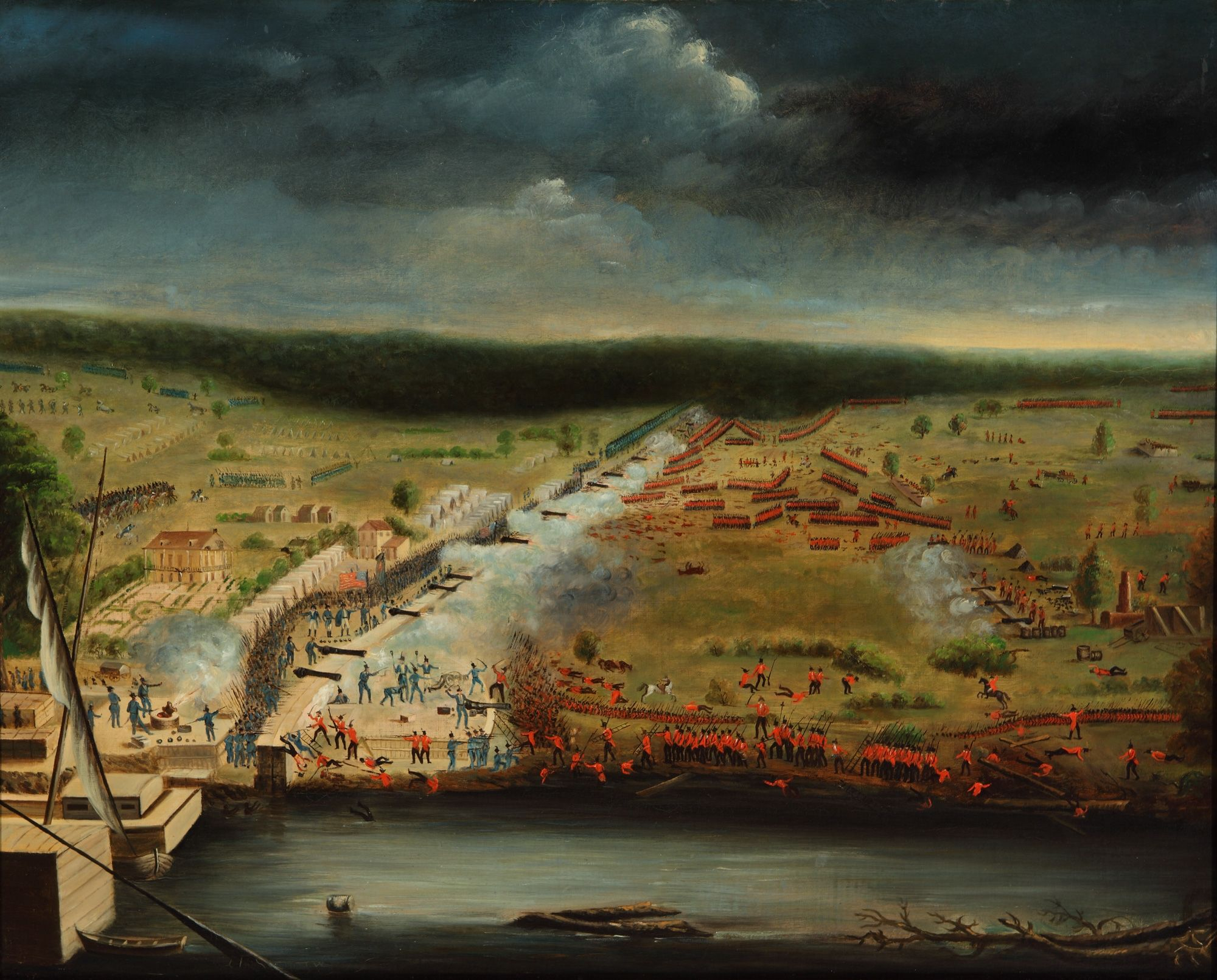
The Battle of New Orleans, at which the regiment carried out a successful attack, January 1815

A second battalion was raised in 1800. The 1st Battalion was deployed to Madeira in 1801 and both battalions went to Jamaica in 1802; the two battalions were amalgamated there later in the year. The regiment absorbed the Bucks volunteers in 1802 and became the 85th (Bucks Volunteers) Regiment of Foot in 1802. It returned to England in 1808 and converted to a Light Infantry role, becoming the 85th (Bucks Volunteers) Regiment of Foot (Light Infantry) later in the year. The regiment next took part in the disastrous Walcheren Campaign in autumn 1809.

The regiment embarked for Portugal in 1811 for service under Viscount Wellington in the Peninsular War. It fought at the Battle of Fuentes de Oñoro in May 1811, the Second Siege of Badajoz later that month and the Siege of San Sebastián in autumn 1813. It then pursued the French Army into France and fought at the Battle of Nivelle in November 1813 and the Battle of the Nive in December 1813 before returning to England in April 1814.

The regiment was dispatched to North America in May 1814 and saw action in the last phase of the War of 1812. It fought at the Battle of Bladensburg, capturing two American colours, in August 1814. Under the command of Colonel William Thornton, the regiment accompanied by detachments from the Royal Navy and Royal Marines, carried out a successful attack on the American positions on the west bank of the Mississippi River during the Battle of New Orleans in January 1815. Casualties among the regiment were: 2 dead, 1 captured and 41 wounded. The regiment returned home later that year.

=== The Victorian era ===
The regiment was dispatched to Malta and became the 85th (or The Duke of York's Own) Regiment of Light Infantry (Bucks Volunteers) in April 1821. After that it transferred to Gibraltar and became the 85th, or The King's Regiment of Light Infantry (Bucks Volunteers) in August 1827. The regiment went back to Malta in 1828 and then returned home in 1831. It embarked for Canada in 1838 as part of the response to the rebellions in Lower and Upper Canada and then transferred to the West Indies in 1843 before returning home in 1846. The regiment was posted to Mauritius in 1853 and South Africa in 1856 before returning home again in 1863. It embarked for India in 1868 and was deployed to Afghanistan for service in the Second Anglo-Afghan War in 1878. After returning to India, it took part in operations against the Zaimukhts and was involved in the destruction of their capital, Zawa, in 1879.

As part of the Cardwell Reforms of the 1870s, where single-battalion regiments were linked together to share a single depot and recruiting district in the United Kingdom, the 85th was linked with the 52nd (Oxfordshire) Regiment of Foot, and assigned to district no. 42 at Cowley Barracks in Oxford. On 1 July 1881 the Childers Reforms came into effect and the regiment amalgamated with 53rd (Shropshire) Regiment of Foot to become the 2nd battalion, the King's Shropshire Light Infantry.

== Battle honours ==
Battle honours won by the regiment were:

- Peninsular War: Fuentes d'Onor, Nive, Peninsula
- War of 1812: Bladensburg
- Second Anglo-Afghan War: Afghanistan 1879-80

== Colonels of the Regiment ==
Colonels of the Regiment were:

=== 85th Regiment of Foot ===
- 1794–1805: F.M. Sir George Nugent, Bt., GCB

=== 85th (Bucks Volunteers) Regiment of Foot - (1802) ===
- 1805–1806: Lt-Gen. Sir Charles Ross, Bt.
- 1806–1807: Gen. Sir Charles Asgill, Bt., GCH

=== 85th (Bucks Volunteers) Regiment of Foot (Light Infantry) - (1808) ===
- 1807–1815: Gen. Thomas Slaughter Stanwix
- 1815–1823: Gen. Sir James Willoughby Gordon, Bt., GCB, GCH

=== 85th (or The Duke of York's Own) Regiment of Light Infantry (Bucks Volunteers) - (1821) ===
- 1823–1839: Lt-Gen. Sir Herbert Taylor, GCB, GCH

=== 85th, or The King's Regiment of Light Infantry (Bucks Volunteers) - (1827) ===
- 1839–1840: Lt-Gen. Sir William Thornton, KCB
- 1840–1843: F.M. Sir John Forster Fitzgerald, GCB
- 1843–1847: Lt-Gen. Sir Thomas Pearson, KCB, KCH
- 1847–1865: Gen. Sir John Wright Guise, Bt., GCB
- 1865–1875: Gen. Frederick Maunsell
- 1875–1876: Lt-Gen. George Campbell, CB
- 1876–1879: Gen. Arnold Charles Errington
- 1879–1880: Lt-Gen. Percy Hill, CB
- 1880–1881: Gen. Sir Henry Percival de Bathe, Bt.

== Sources ==
- Patterson, Benton Rain (2008), The Generals, Andrew Jackson, Sir Edward Pakenham, and the road to New Orleans, New York: New York University Press, ISBN 978-0-8147-6717-7
