= King's Shropshire Light Infantry =

The King's Shropshire Light Infantry
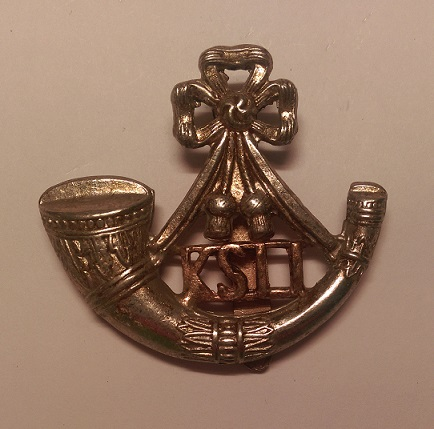
- Regimental cap badge of the King's Shropshire Light Infantry.
- Active: 1881–1968
- Country: United Kingdom
- Branch: British Army
- Type: Infantry
- Role: Light infantry
- Size: 1–2 Regular battalions 1–3 Volunteer and Territorial battalions Up to 6 hostilities-only battalions
- Part of: Light Infantry Brigade (1948 to 1968)
- Garrison/HQ: Copthorne Barracks, Shrewsbury
- Motto: Aucto Splendore Resurgo ("I rise again with increased splendour")
- March: Quick : 1st Bn : "Old Towler" - 2nd Bn : "The daughter of the regiment"

Commanders
- Notable commanders: Charles Edmond Knox; Raymond Reade

The King's Shropshire Light Infantry (KSLI) was a light infantry regiment of the British Army, formed in the Childers Reforms of 1881, but with antecedents dating back to 1755. It served in the Second Boer War, World War I, World War II and Korean War. In 1968, the four regiments of the Light Infantry Brigade (the KSLI, Somerset and Cornwall Light Infantry, King's Own Yorkshire Light Infantry and Durham Light Infantry) amalgamated to form The Light Infantry, with the 1st KSLI being redesignated as the 3rd Battalion of the new regiment.

== History ==
=== Formation ===
The King's Light Infantry (Shropshire Regiment) was formed on 1 July 1881 as the county regiment of Herefordshire and Shropshire as part of the Childers Reforms. It was renamed as The King's (Shropshire Light Infantry) on 10 March 1882.

The regiment was an amalgamation of the 53rd (Shropshire) Regiment of Foot and the 85th (King's Light Infantry) Regiment of Foot, which became the regular 1st and 2nd Battalions. The 1881 reforms also redesignated the militia and rifle volunteers units within the regimental district as battalions of the regiment. Accordingly, the Shropshire Militia and Royal Herefordshire Militia became the 3rd and 4th (Militia) Battalions respectively, and the 1st and 2nd Shropshire Rifle Volunteer Corps became the 1st and 2nd Volunteer Battalions. The 1st Herefordshire (Herefordshire and Radnorshire) Rifle Volunteer Corps was also affiliated as a volunteer battalion, without change of title.

The 1st battalion of the KSLI was stationed in Egypt from 1882, and served with distinction in the Anglo-Egyptian War. The battalion transferred to Malta where it was from 1883 to 1891, but was back in the Eastern Sudan serving in the Soudan Expedition 1886–87. From 1891 the battalion was in Hong Kong, and three years later it was moved to British India, serving there until early 1903. The last posting in India was at Poona.

The 2nd battalion was stationed in Ireland from 1886 to 1894, and in late 1899 embarked for South Africa as part of the reinforcements for the Second Boer War. Following the end of the war in South Africa in 1902, the battalion went to India on the SS Syria in January 1903, where it was stationed at Ranikhet in Bengal.

In 1908, as part of the Haldane Reforms, the two militia battalions were merged to form the 3rd (Special Reserve) Battalion and the 1st and 2nd VBs were merged to form the 4th Battalion Territorial Force at Longden Coleham in Shrewsbury. At the same time, the Herefordshire RVC became independent as the Herefordshire Regiment (TF).

=== First World War ===
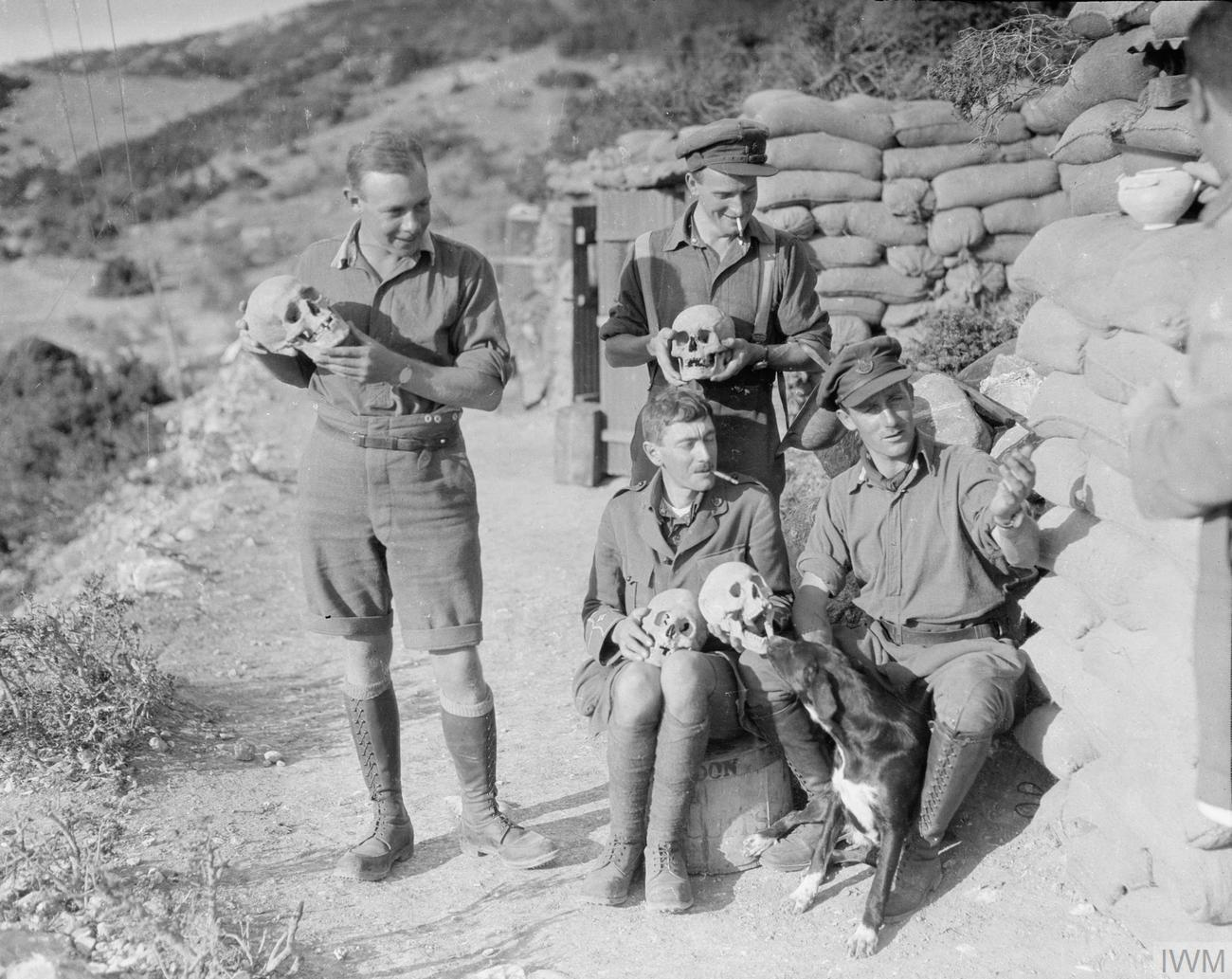
Officers of the 2nd King's Shropshire Light Infantry with skulls excavated during the construction of trenches and dugouts at the ancient Greek site of Amphipolis, 1916.

==== Regular Army ====
The 1st Battalion landed at Saint-Nazaire as part of the 16th Brigade in 6th Division in September 1914 for service on the Western Front.

The 2nd Battalion landed at Le Havre as part of the 80th Brigade in the 27th Division in December 1914 also for service on the Western Front.

==== Territorial Force ====
The 1/4th Battalion served in India before landing at Le Havre as part of the 159th Brigade in the 53rd (Welsh) Division in July 1917 for service on the Western Front. It made an important counter-attack against the Germans at Bligny in June 1918 during the Spring Offensive for which it was awarded the French Croix de Guerre.

The 10th (Shropshire & Cheshire Yeomanry) Battalion landed at Marseille as part of the 231st Brigade in the 74th (Yeomanry) Division in May 1918 also for service on the Western Front.

==== New Armies ====
The 5th (Service) Battalion landed at Boulogne-sur-Mer as part of the 42nd Brigade in the 14th (Light) Division in May 1915 also for service on the Western Front.

The 6th (Service) Battalion landed at Boulogne-Sur-Mer as part of the 60th Brigade in the 20th (Light) Division in July 1915 also for service on the Western Front.

The 7th (Service) Battalion landed at Boulogne-sur-Mer as part of the 76th Brigade in the 25th Division in September 1915 also for service on the Western Front.

The 8th (Service) Battalion landed in France as part of the 66th Brigade in the 22nd Division in September 1915 but sailed to Salonika in November 1915. It was disbanded there on 1 December 1918 and its personnel transferred to the 2nd Battalion.

=== Between the wars ===
On 7 September 1919, during the Irish War of Independence following the war in Europe, the KSLI suffered the British Army's first casualties at the hands of the IRA when a detachment from a unit stationed at Fermoy was ambushed on a church parade by an IRA unit under the command of Liam Lynch; one soldier was killed, four wounded and the rest disarmed by the motor-borne raiders. After the failure of a local coroner's inquest to return a murder verdict on the dead man, the next day 200 soldiers attacked businesses belonging to members of the inquest jury in an unofficial reprisal. In 1921, the regiment was renamed as The King's Shropshire Light Infantry.

After its Irish posting, the Second Battalion was moved away in December 1922 to Tidworth. A further journey followed to Minden Barracks in Cologne in 1924 as part of the garrison of the demilitarised Rhineland, and across the river in January 1926 to Wiesbaden, where its band played the regular round of paid civilian engagements as well as appearing at both the 1924 and 1925 Empire Exhibitions at Wembley. Bandmaster Burnell was the last to conduct the National Anthem before the withdrawal of British troops from the area in November 1927. The battalion returned to Aldershot.

=== Second World War ===
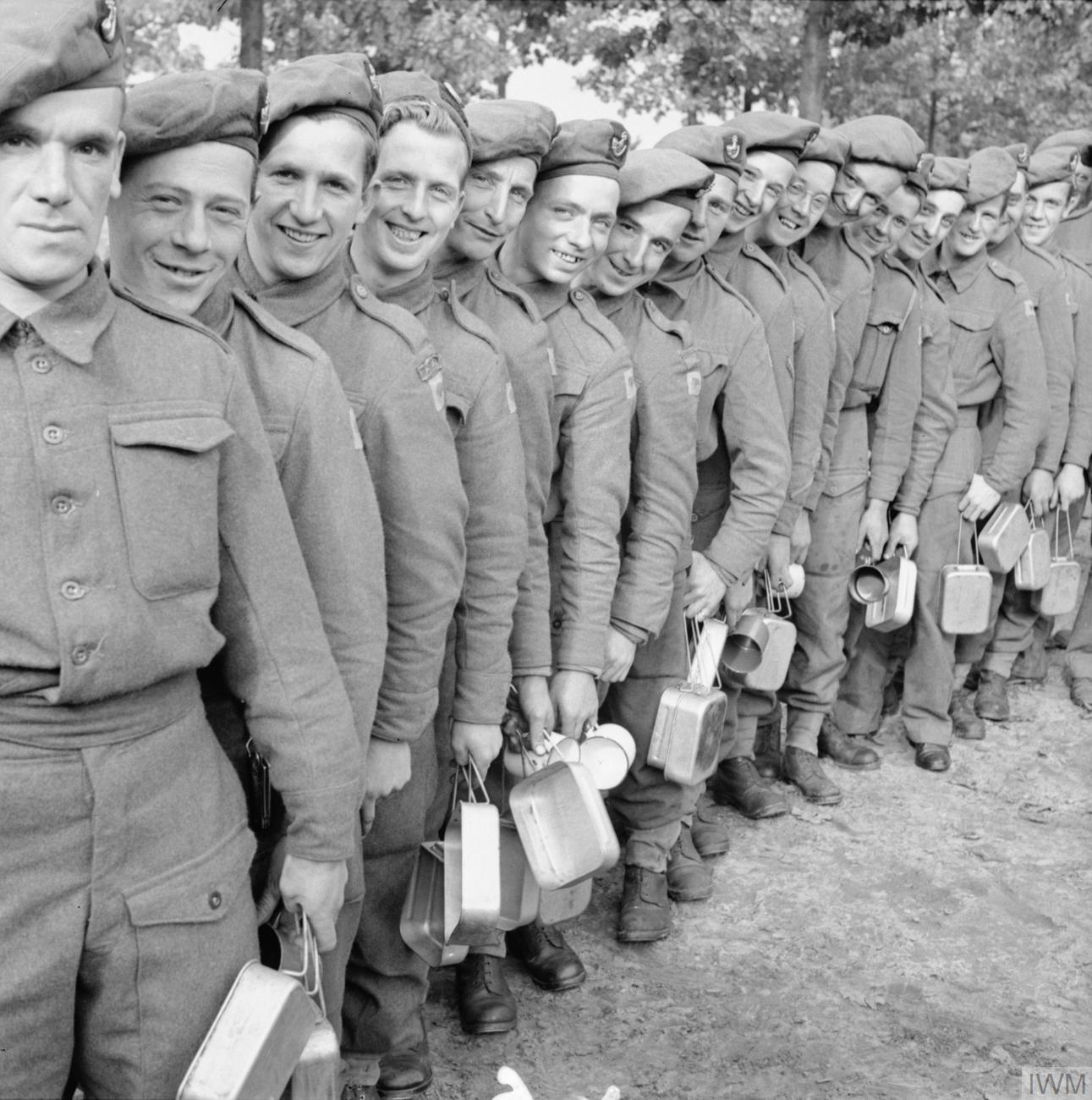
Men of the King's Shropshire Light Infantry queue for their rations at a rest camp in Holland, 26 October 1944.

==== Regular Army ====
The 1st Battalion would serve with the 3rd Infantry Brigade, part of the 1st Infantry Division for the entire war. Corporal Thomas Priday was killed by a land mine near Metz on 9 December 1939 when the 1st Battalion was based near the Maginot Line as part of the original British Expeditionary Force that was sent to France at the outbreak of war. The battalion fought in the Battle of Dunkirk, the Tunisia Campaign and the Italian Campaign including the Battle of Anzio.

The 2nd Battalion began the war in Jamaica, with a company detached to the Bermuda Garrison. The battalion would eventually join the 185th Infantry Brigade, which included the 2nd Battalion, Royal Warwickshire Regiment and the 1st Battalion, Royal Norfolk Regiment. The brigade was originally assigned to the 79th Armoured Division, but was then transferred to the 3rd British Infantry Division in April 1943, when the division was preparing to invade Sicily, until it was replaced by the 1st Canadian Infantry Division. The battalion took part in the D-Day landings of Operation Overlord, where they failed to capture the D-Day objective of Caen due to the presence of the 21st Panzer Division. The 2nd Battalion fought in the Normandy Campaign, Operation Market Garden and the rest of the North West Europe Campaign with the British Second Army. In March 1945, Sergeant James Stokes, a Scotsman, of the 2nd Battalion was posthumously awarded the Victoria Cross.

==== Territorial Army ====
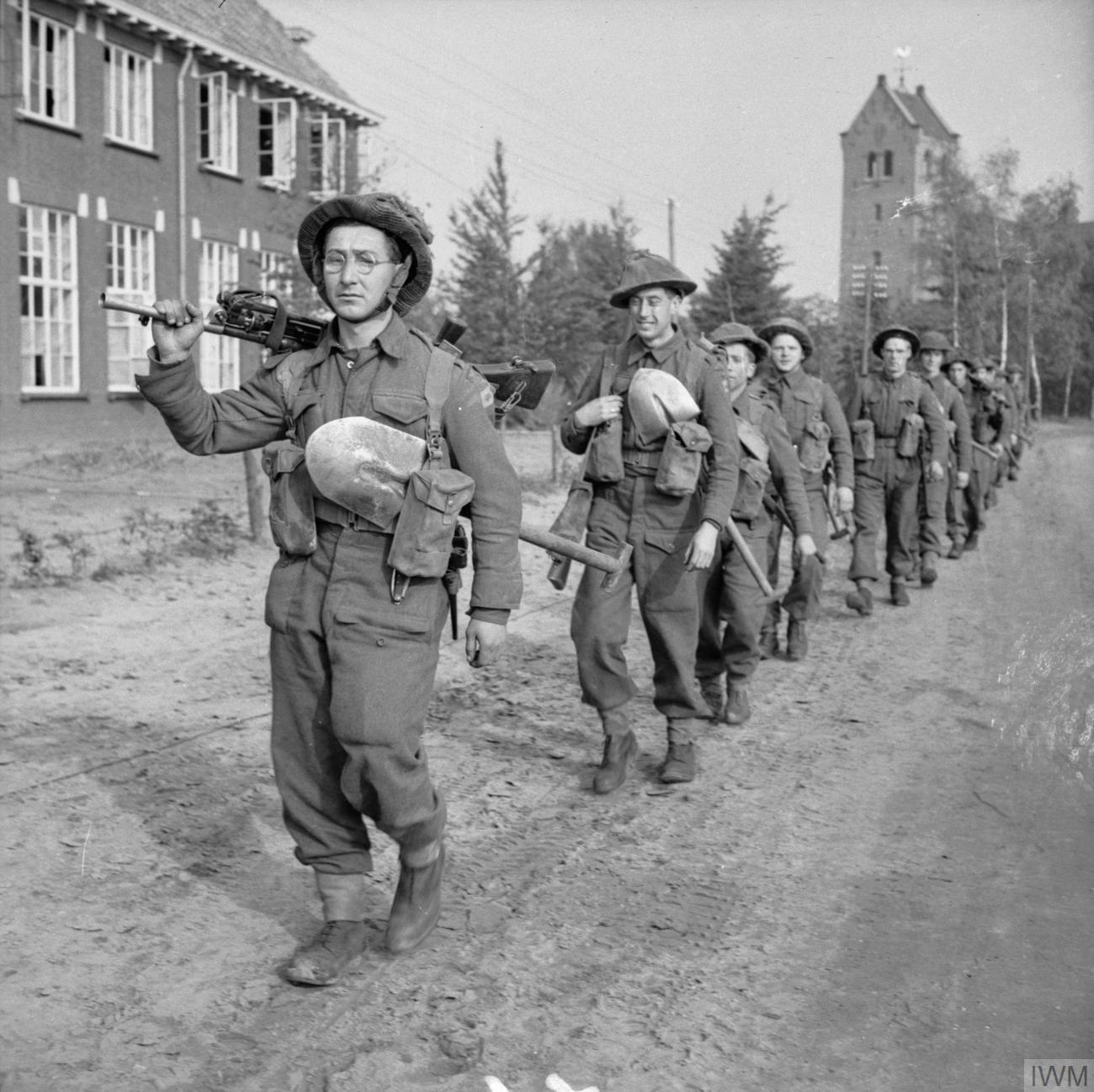
Men of the 4th Battalion, King's Shropshire Light Infantry march back from the front line for a four-day rest, 26 October 1944.

The 4th Battalion was a 1st Line Territorial Army (TA) unit assigned to the 159th Infantry Brigade, part of the 53rd (Welsh) Infantry Division. However, on 17 May 1942, the 4th KSLI, along with the brigade, were transferred to become the motorised infantry element of the 11th "Black Bull" Armoured Division. They spent many months training in preparation for Operation Overlord and the 4th KSLI, like the 2nd Battalion, also served with distinction in the North West Europe Campaign. In October 1944, Sergeant George Harold Eardley of the 4th Battalion was awarded the Victoria Cross for his part in knocking out multiple enemy machine guns.

The 5th Battalion was a 2nd Line TA duplicate of the 4th Battalion formed in 1939 on the doubling of the Territorial Army as, by this time, another European conflict seemed inevitable. The battalion was assigned to the 114th Infantry Brigade of the 38th (Welsh) Infantry Division, a 2nd Line duplicate of the 53rd (Welsh) Division which the 4th Battalion was originally assigned. The battalion remained within the United Kingdom on home defence duties. In 1944, the battalion was transferred to the 80th Infantry (Reserve) Division and later the 38th Infantry (Reserve) Division. With these two formations, the battalion served as a training unit for both the KSLI and the North Staffordshire Regiment, eventually sending over 100 officers and 4,000 other ranks to the front-line as trained replacements.

==== Hostilities-only ====
A hostilities-only unit, the 6th Battalion was raised in June 1940 and assigned to the 204th Independent Infantry Brigade (Home), later part of Lincolnshire County Division. The 6th Battalion was converted into 181st Field Regiment, Royal Artillery in March 1942. At the time, there was a shortage of insignia, so the troops were ordered to cut off the 'KING'S' and 'L.I.' from the ends of their cloth shoulder titles, leaving 'SHROPSHIRE', which led to the regiment's nickname 'the Shropshire Gunners'. This regiment served with 15th (Scottish) Infantry Division, wearing Scottish Tam o' Shanter caps and Royal Artillery badges, but still with a regimental badge of a gold light infantry bugle horn embroidered on a green background. The Shropshire Gunners supported 15th (Scottish) throughout the North West Europe Campaign from Normandy to Germany, being the first field artillery regiment across both the Rhine and the Elbe.

The 7th and 8th Battalions were, like the 6th Battalion, raised in 1940. The 7th Battalion was converted to the 99th Anti-Tank Regiment in November 1942, but was disbanded in December 1943. The 8th (Home Defence) Battalion was raised specifically for home defence duties until it became a training unit until 1943 when it was disbanded.

=== Postwar ===
In 1948, the KSLI was reduced to one regular battalion and became part of the Light Infantry Brigade.

The KSLI was to participate in Korean War and was the longest-serving British regiment, alongside the King's Own Scottish Borderers.

In 1968, the Brigade's four regiments (the KSLI, Somerset and Cornwall Light Infantry, King's Own Yorkshire Light Infantry and Durham Light Infantry) were amalgamated to form The Light Infantry, with the 1st KSLI being redesignated as the 3rd Battalion of the new regiment.

== Regimental museum ==
The KSLI was based at Copthorne Barracks in Shrewsbury. Its regimental museum has been located in Shrewsbury Castle since 1985 and combines the collections of the 53rd, the 85th, the KSLI to 1968, the local Militia, Rifle Volunteers and Territorials, as well as those of other county regiments - the Shropshire Yeomanry and the Shropshire Artillery. The museum was attacked by the IRA in 1992 and extensive damage to the collection and to some of the Castle resulted: it re-opened in 1995.

== Battle honours ==
As well as inheriting the battle honours of the 53rd and 85th Foot, the KSLI bore the following honours on their colours:

- Early wars
  - Egypt 1882, Suakin 1885, Paardeberg, South Africa 1899-1902
- Ten selected honours for the First World War:
  - Armentieres, 1914, Ypres 1915, '17, Frezenberg, Somme 1916, '18, Arras, 1917, '18, Cambrai, 1917, '18, Bligny, Epehy, Doiran, 1917, '18, Jerusalem
- Ten selected honours for the Second World War:
  - Dunkirk, 1940, Normandy Landing, Antwerp, Venraij, Hochwald, Bremen, North-West Europe 1940, '44-'45, Tunis, Anzio, Italy, 1943-5
- Later wars
  - Korea, 1951-2

== Colonels ==
The following served as Colonel of the regiment:

- General Sir Charles Trollope, KCB (1st Bn 27 December 1868)
- General Sir Henry de Bathe, 4th Baronet KCB (2nd Bn 25 April 1880)
- Lieutenant-General Sir Charles Edmond Knox KCB (6 January 1907)
- Major-General Raymond Northland Revell Reade, CB (19 January 1921)
- General Sir Charles John Cecil Grant, KCB, KCVO, DSO (16 February 1931)
- Major-General John Malcolm Lawrence Grover, CB, MC (1 January 1947)
- Lieutenant-General Sir Ernest Edward Down, KBE, CB (5 May 1955)
- Major-General William Reginald Cox, CB, DSO (5 November 1957)
- General Sir Geoffrey Randolph Dixon Musson, GCB, CBE, DSO (5 November 1963)

== Notable soldiers ==
- Private Arthur "Nick" Carter served with the regiment from 1901 to 1951. He actively served in the Second Boer War (1899–1902) and World War I (1914–1918). When he retired, he was the oldest serving member of the British Army. He earned ten Good Conduct stripes and the Long Service and Good Conduct Medal with two clasps for 48 years of good service, the only soldier in British Army history to do so.

== Recipients of the Victoria Cross ==
- Sergeant George Harold Eardley, 4th Battalion, Second World War
- Private Charles Irwin, 53rd (Shropshire) Regiment of Foot, Indian Rebellion of 1857
- Sergeant James Stokes, 2nd Battalion, Second World War
- Private Harold Edward Whitfield, 10th (Shropshire and Cheshire Yeomanry) Battalion, Great War
