= Henry James Johnstone =

British-Australian painter and photographer

Henry James Johnstone (1835–1907) was a leading portrait photographer in Melbourne, Victoria, Australia during the 1870s and 1880s, and also a prominent artist.

== Early life ==
Henry Johnstone was born in Birmingham, England, in 1835 and studied art under a number of private teachers and at the Birmingham School of Design before joining his father's photographic firm.

== Photographic activity ==
He arrived in Melbourne, Australia, in 1853 aged 18. In 1862 he bought out the Duryea and MacDonald Studio and started work as Johnstone and Co. In 1865 the firm became Johnstone, O'Shannessy and Co. with partner Emily O’Shannessy and co-owner George Hasler.

Johnstone, O’Shannessy & Co. were Melbourne’s leading portrait photographers whose services were sought by governors, visiting royalty, politicians and other prominent members of society. Johnstone impressed the Duke of Edinburgh during his visit to Victoria and was appointed to his staff as Royal Photographer.

Examples of Johnstone, O’Shannessy & Co.’s photographic portraits were included in the Philadelphia Centennial Exhibition of 1875 and the 1888 Melbourne International Exhibition where the excellence of their work was noted by the judges.

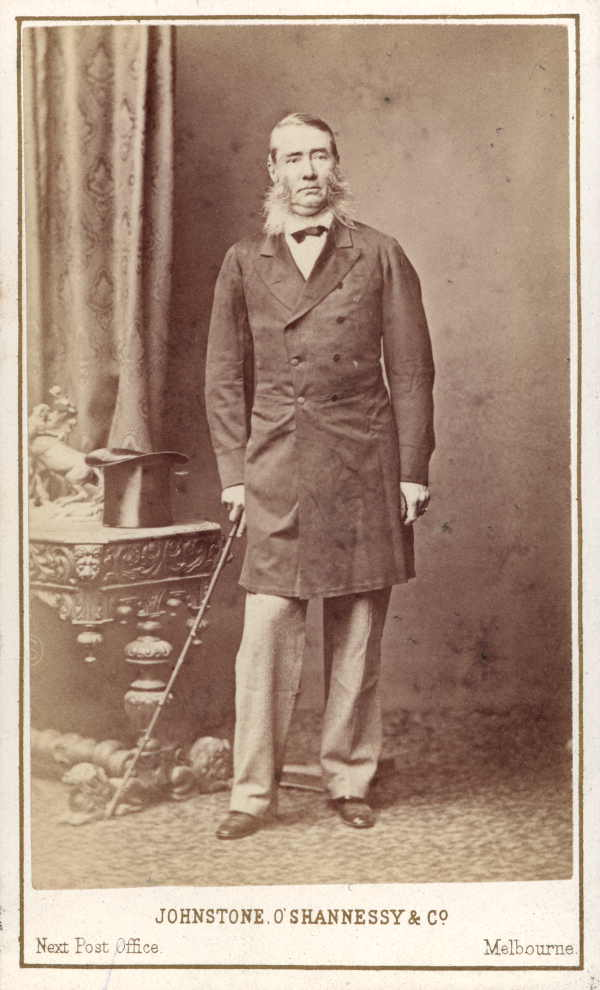
3rd Viscount Canterbury, Governor of Victoria from 1866 to 1873

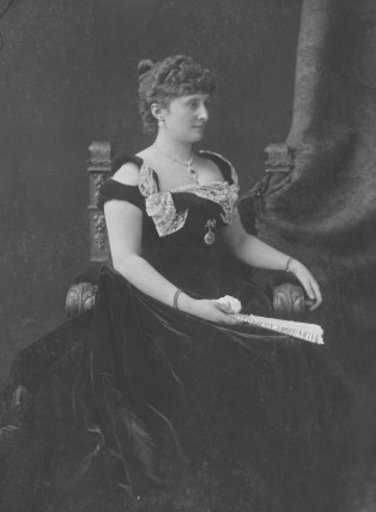
Lady Constance Knox, daughter of the 5th Earl of Ranfurly, Governor of New Zealand, 1899

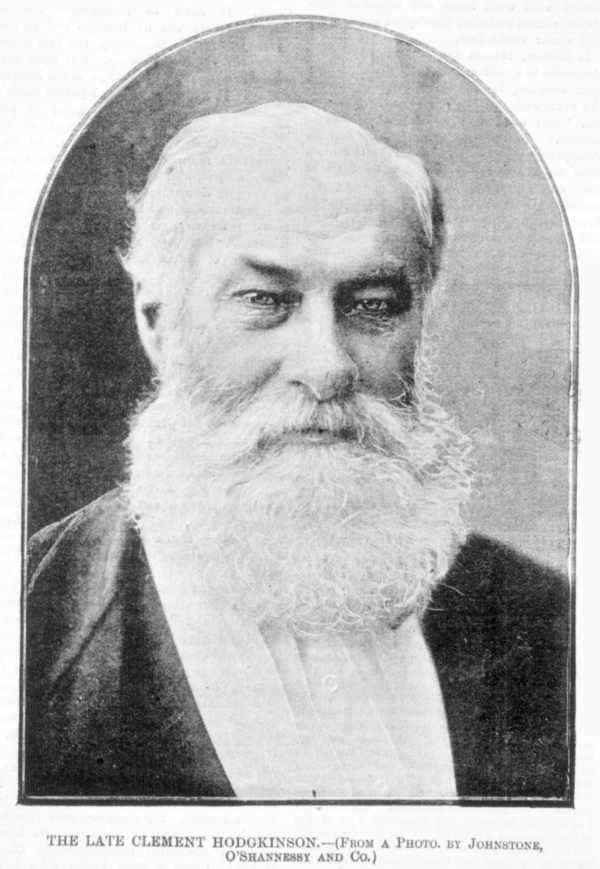
Clement Hodgkinson, Victorian Assistant Commissioner of Crown Lands and Survey from 1861 to 1874, c.1893

== Artistic activity ==
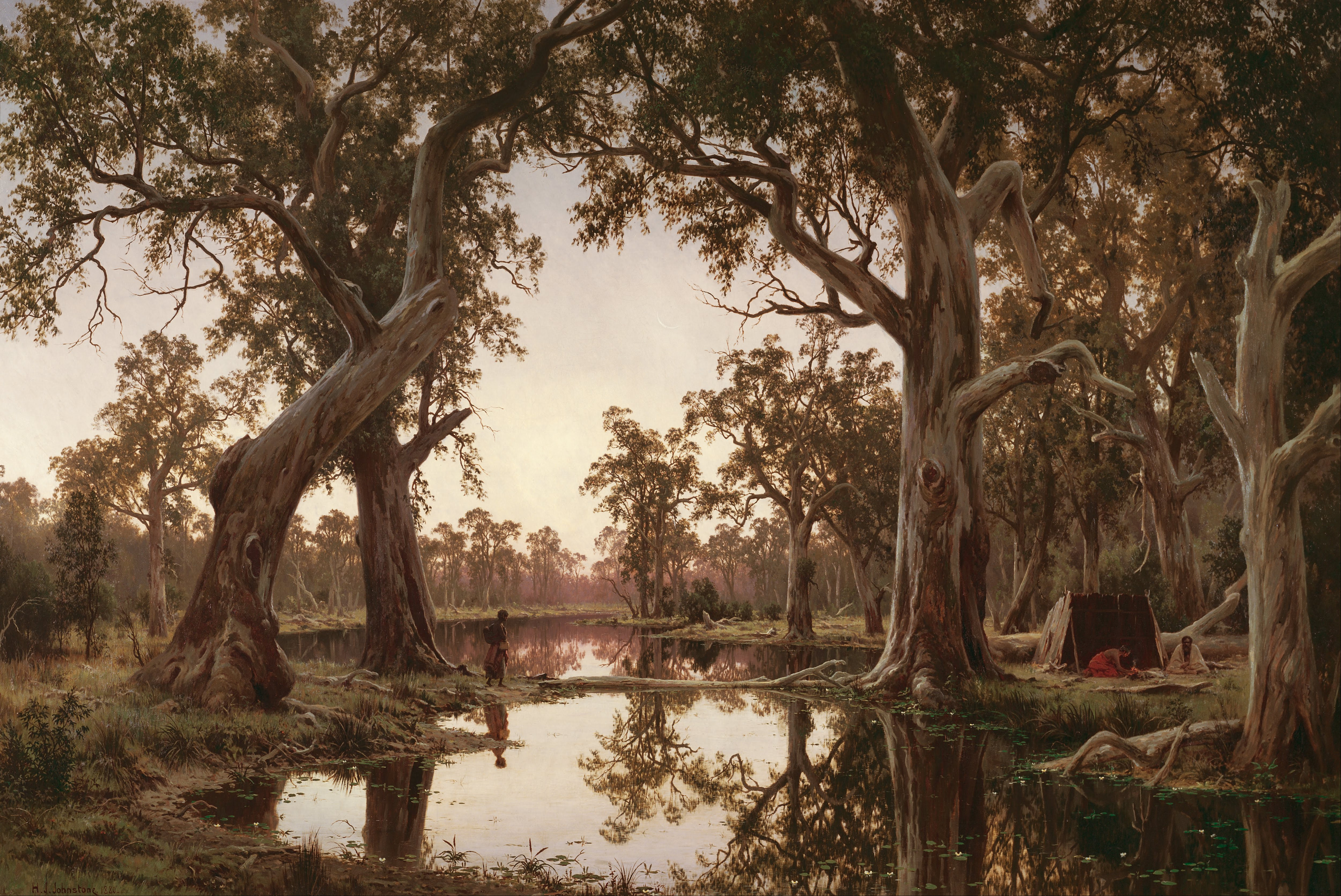
Evening Shadows (1880), the first painting acquired by the Art Gallery of South Australia

Johnstone was also a prominent artist. After studying with sculptor Charles Summers and then joining Louis Buvelot's painting school in 1867, he joined the Melbourne National Gallery School of Painting under Thomas Clark. He became a member of the Victorian Academy of Arts in 1871, and a member of the Society of British Artists.

== Later life ==
In 1876 Johnstone left Melbourne for South Australia, where his realistic, highly detailed studies of local scenes were well received; he is represented in the Art Gallery of South Australia by three paintings: Evening shadows, backwater of the Murray, The Waterfall, Morialta and an untitled nude seated by a stream. He then travelled extensively in America, and then in 1880 to London, where he regularly exhibited paintings at the Royal Academy until 1900. He painted to order several landscapes for theatre entrepreneur Edgar Chapman. He died in London in 1907 aged 72.
