= Charles Milnes Gaskell =

English lawyer and politician

The Right Honourable Charles Milnes Gaskell PC JP DL
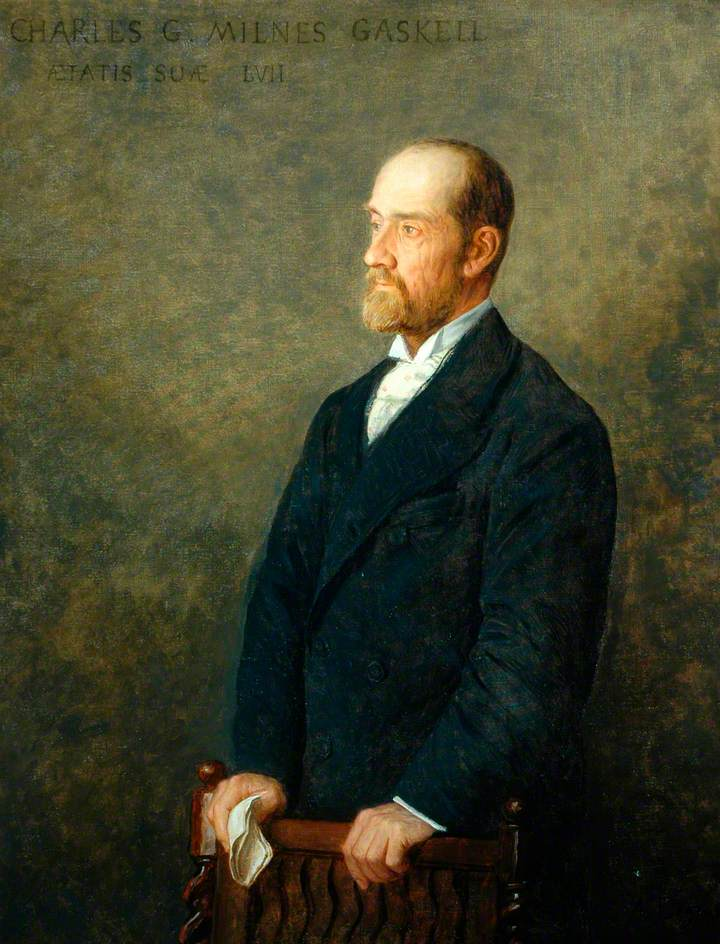

Member of Parliament for Morley
- In office 1885–1892
- Preceded by: New constituency
- Succeeded by: Alfred Hutton

Personal details
- Born: Charles George Milnes Gaskell; 23 January 1842 London, England
- Died: 9 January 1919 (aged 76) Thornes House, Wakefield, Yorkshire
- Party: Liberal
- Spouse: Lady Catherine Wallop (m. 1876)
- Parent(s): James Milnes Gaskell; Mary Williams-Wynn
- Education: Eton College
- Alma mater: Trinity College, Cambridge

Charles George Milnes Gaskell PC JP DL (23 January 1842 – 9 January 1919) was an English lawyer and Liberal Party politician.

== Early life ==
Milnes Gaskell was born on 23 January 1842 in London. He was the son of James Milnes Gaskell, MP for Wenlock (only son of Benjamin Gaskell of Thornes House, Wakefield, Yorkshire, and Wenlock Abbey, Much Wenlock, Shropshire), and his wife Mary Williams-Wynn. His sister, Isabel Milnes Gaskell, married the Rev. Fitzgerald Wintour, parents of Maj.-Gen. Fitzgerald Wintour (grandfather of Vogue editor Anna Wintour).

His maternal grandparents were Charles Williams-Wynn, MP for Old Sarum and Montgomeryshire (who was the second son of Sir Watkin Williams-Wynn, 4th Baronet), and Mary Cunliffe (a daughter of Sir Foster Cunliffe, 3rd Baronet).

He was educated at Eton College and Trinity College, Cambridge, where he graduated BA in 1863 and MA in 1866, and was called to the bar at Inner Temple in 1866.

== Career ==
He was a Justice of the Peace and Deputy Lieutenant for the West Riding of Yorkshire and was Chairman of the West Riding County Council from 1893 to 1910.

Milnes Gaskell stood unsuccessfully in Pontefract in 1868 and at Knaresborough in 1881. At the 1885 general election he was elected as the first Member of Parliament for Morley and held it until he retired from parliament at the 1892 general election. He was awarded an Honorary LLD by the University of Leeds in 1904. and was made a Privy Counsellor in 1908. From 1902 to 1914 he was Honorary Colonel of the 4th Battalion of the King's Own Yorkshire Light Infantry.

== Personal life ==
Milnes Gaskell, who lived at Thornes House, Wakefield, and at Wenlock Abbey, married Lady Catherine Henrietta Wallop (1856—1935), daughter of the 5th Earl of Portsmouth in 1876. She was a minor author. Together, they were the parents of:

- Evelyn Milnes Gaskell (1877–1931), a Major who married Lady Constance Harriet Stuart, daughter of Uchter Knox, 5th Earl of Ranfurly and the Hon. Constance Caulfeild (only child of the 7th Viscount Charlemont), in 1905.
- Mary Milnes Gaskell (1881–1975), who married Maj.-Gen. Henry Dudley Ossulston Ward, in 1919.

Milnes Gaskell had a long-standing friendship with the American Henry Adams who introduced him to novelist Henry James. He and his wife invited both men to stay frequently at Wenlock Abbey, where the couple entertained many artists, writers, politicians and intellectuals of the day including explorer Isabella Bishop, artist Robert Bateman and writers Edith Sichel and Thomas Hardy.

Milnes Gaskell died on 9 January 1919 at Thornes House at the age of 76, and was buried in the parish churchyard at Much Wenlock. In his will he left Thornes House to his son, Evelyn, (Note: Thornes House was destroyed by a fire in 1951.) and Wenlock Abbey to his wife, who died in 1935, leaving the Abbey to their daughter, Mrs. Mary Ward.

Parliament of the United Kingdom
New constituency	Member of Parliament for Morley; 1885 – 1892	Succeeded by Alfred Hutton
