= W. R. Pybus =

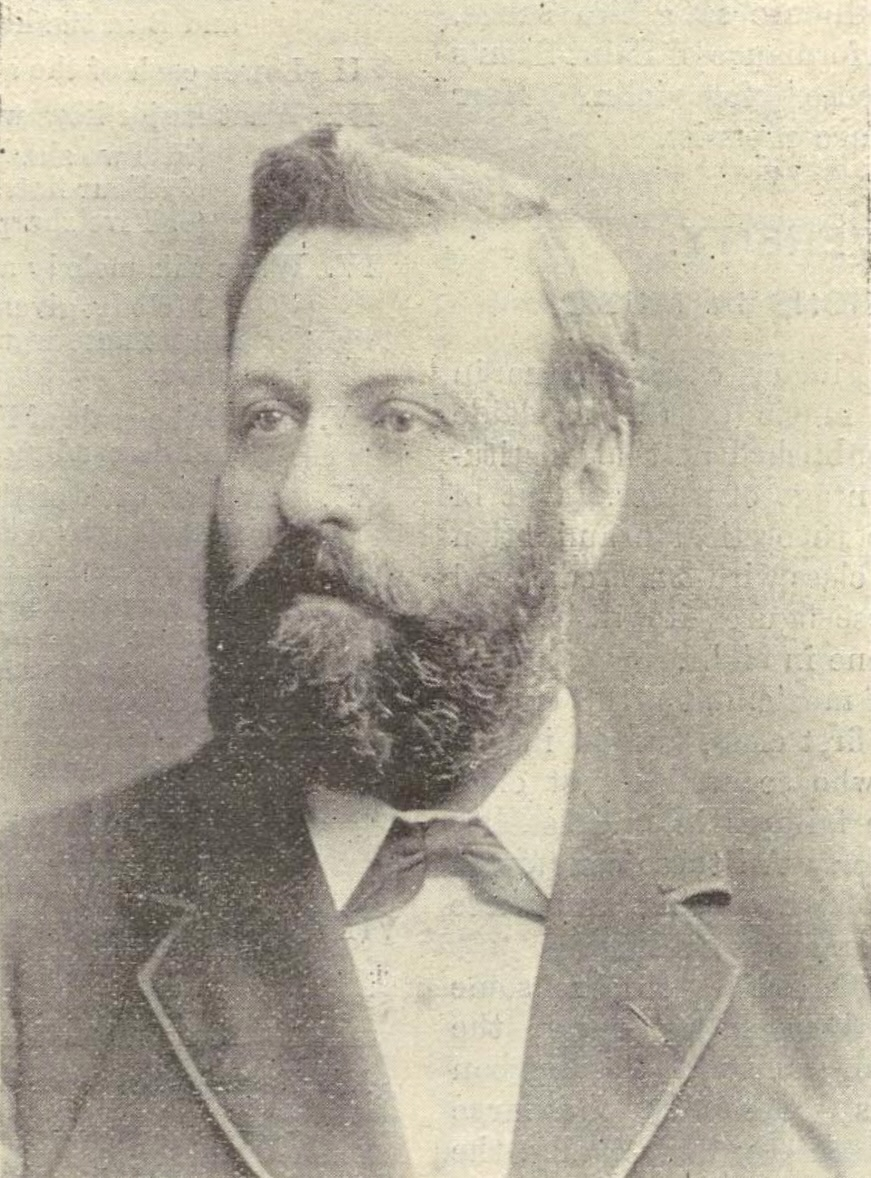
Pybus in 1897

William Richard Pybus (9 October 1848 – 11 November 1917) was an Australian organist, pianist and music teacher.

== History ==
Pybus was born in Hindley Street, Adelaide, the eldest son of ironfounder William Pybus jun. (1820–1885), whose family arrived on the ship Orissa in March 1840, and Sarah Pybus née Cox (c. 1826 – 7 June 1915), who married on 18 January 1848.

Pybus commenced his musical studies at eight years of age, and was a solo chorister at St. Andrew's Church, Walkerville and Trinity Church, Adelaide. He sang at the first Handel festival held in the colony, around 1858. He received piano lessons from a lady teacher at the Walkerville day school, then from Richard Baxter White RAM (1839–1872), a son of George White of White's Rooms fame. From the age of 10 years he took the organ for occasional services, and was early recognised as one of Adelaide's leading pianists and accompanists.

He had been working at his father's foundry on North Terrace, (Note: The Pybus foundry was noted for casting bells, such as the 60 pounds (27 kg) bell for the Montacute Mine in 1844, one of 150 pounds (68 kg) for the Burra mine, and a 16-inch bell for St. Andrew's church, Grenfell Street cast on 5 March 1845 (later at the Presbyterian Girls' College). St. George's Anglican Church, Magill, claims its Pybus bell was the first cast in South Australia.) but left the business around 1869. Subsequently, he studied music at the Adelaide University.

In 1873, he was appointed organist, ahead of George Oughton, at the Kent Town Wesleyan Methodist Church, where, a fine new Hill organ had just been installed, and served there for 14 years.

He started teaching piano, organ, and singing in 1875. He gained a high reputation as a teacher, and many students achieved a degree of recognition.

For 14 years he was organist with the Methodist Church in Adelaide, and for two and a half years with the Tynte Street, North Adelaide, Baptist Church.

He succeeded James Shakespeare as pianist to the old Philharmonic Society, under conductor E. L Spiller, which gave way to the Adelaide Amateur Musical Union under Oughton, and Pybus was appointed pianist. He formally opened the Adelaide Town Hall organ for the Musical Union with a choral performance on 2 October 1877. David Lee, later Melbourne City Organist, played the solo pieces. In 1879 Pybus succeeded Oughton as conductor of the Musical Union, which disbanded in 1881, and Pybus was appointed conductor of its successor, the re-formed Philharmonic Society. While conductor he produced several oratorios and cantatas.

In 1881, he inaugurated the students' annual concerts.

In 1887, he was appointed organist to the North Adelaide Baptist Church, then organist and choirmaster of the Flinders Street Presbyterian Church from 1891 to November 1917, succeeded by Horace Weber.

At the Adelaide Jubilee International Exhibition of 1887 he gave several organ recitals,

In 1890, the S.A. Sunday School Union appointed him musical director for the Jubilee Festival. He was also the director of the Sunday School Union Festival of 1895.

He was appointed city organist in May 1891, in preference to T. H. Jones, Mus. Bac. (1858–1929), though more experienced (Jones held the post in an honorary capacity until then) and arguably the better musician. Pybus held the position until September 1917, when he resigned in consequence of ill health, and was succeeded by Jones.

He opened the organs in the Unitarian Church on Wakefield Street, Adelaide in 1877, Wellington Square Primitive Methodist Church in 1898, and the Baptist Church, Norwood. reopened Pirie Street Methodist Church organ in 1902

== Family ==
William Richard Pybus married Annie Emma Sweet (21 Jan 1857 – 30 May 1950), a fine singer and daughter of Captain Sweet, in 1880. They had three daughters:

- Iris Annie Pybus (1881–1956) married Otto Adolph Von Der Dippe ( – ) on 22 October 1906
- Gladys Margueritte Pybus (1886–)
- Doris Marjorie Pybus (1892–1961) married Arthur Cleghorn Cuming (1890–1915) on 12 December 1914

- Athalie Arthur Cuming (1916–) married Hannah Lowe in 1929

They had a home "Iris Villa" on Flinders Street, later "Ashantee", Henley Beach. Annie later lived at Park Terrace, Hillside.

=== Arrivals in 1840 ===
Machinist William Marmaduke Pybus, aka William Pybus sen. (c. 1799 – 12 April 1854) and Ann Pybus (c. 1799 – 30 May 1871) and their family (William jun., Ann Matilda, Robert James, Charles, Elizabeth, Jane, and Henry) emigrated to South Australia aboard the ship Orissa, arriving in March 1840. He and William Pybus jun. established Pybus & Son, also known as Victoria Iron & Brass and Bell Foundry, on the Leigh Street corner of Hindley Street (Town Acre 76) in 1841, added iron foundry facilities 1843, destroyed by fire 1847. Moved to Town Acre 60, Hindley Street, 1848–1915. See Notes (below) for instances of bells they cast.

- William Pybus jun (31 January 1820 – 4 August 1885) ran the Victoria Foundry with his father. He married Sarah Cox on 18 January 1848. Their children include W. R. Pybus, the subject of this article.
- Ann Matilda Pybus (26 January 1822 – ) married watchmaker James Kemp in 1846
- Robert James Pybus (22 February 1825 – 22 December 1871) settled in Mount Barker, where he had a blacksmith's shop; married Mary Ann Fuller on 9 October 1849. Died while fireman on the Murray steamer Providence.
- Charles Pybus (12 March 1828 – 6 September 1893) died in Rockhampton, Queensland after attempted suicide.
- Elizabeth Pybus (23 January 1830 – 1904 in Sydney) married Isaac Hillier on 3 September 1851.
- Jane Pybus (c. 1833 – 19 January 1883) Married William Charles Sanders 24th December 1859
- Henry Pybus (c. 1837 – 25 March 1879) drowned at Southport, Northern Territory
- Edward Marmaduke Pybus (17 March 1841 – 29 August 1879) died at Mount Gambier

They had a home "Cranley Cottage" at Nailsworth, South Australia
