= Richard Burgess (biblical scholar) =

English theologian and biblical scholar (1796–1881)

The Reverend Richard Burgess
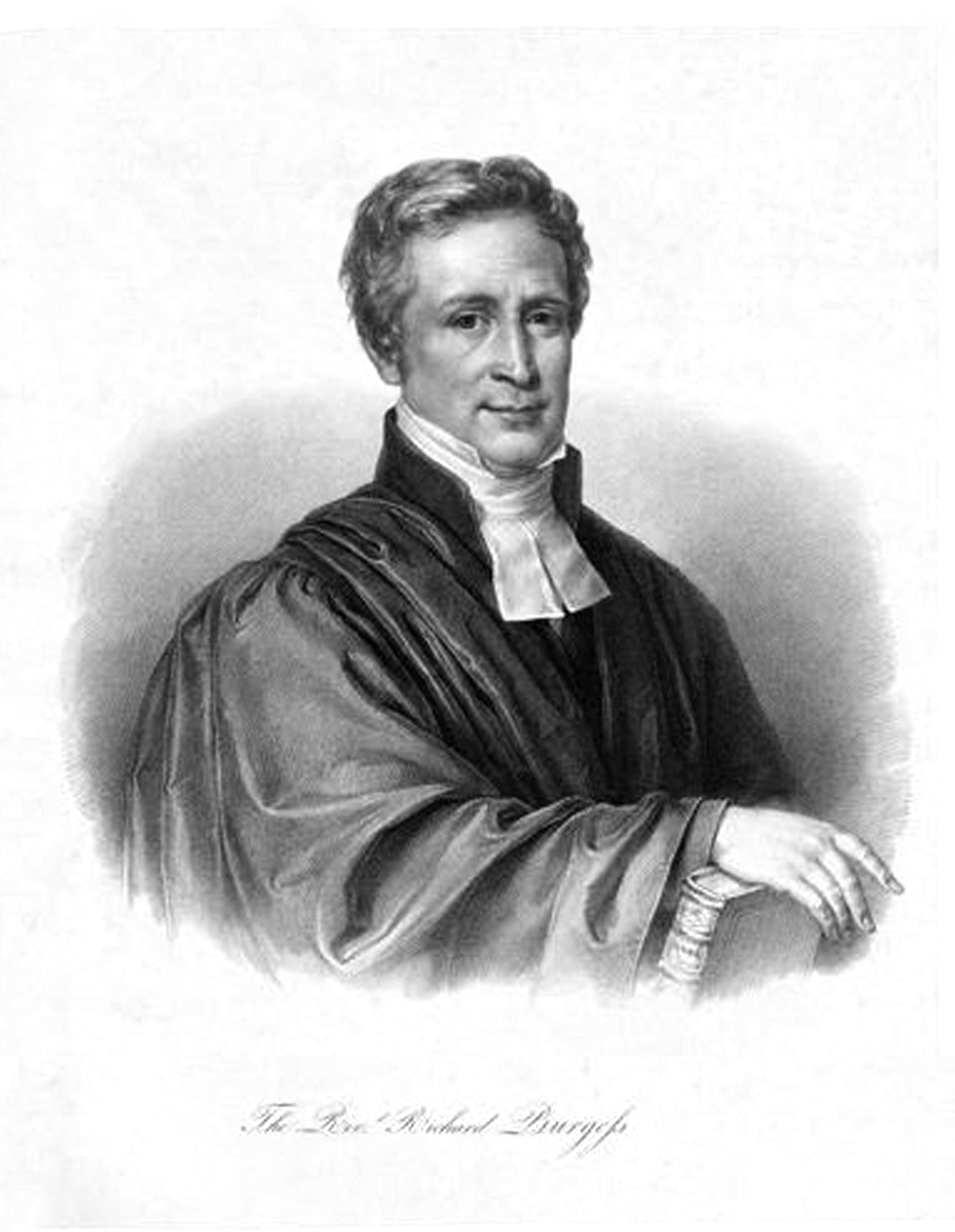
- The Rv Richard Burgess
- Born: 4 December 1796
- Died: 12 April 1881 (aged 84); Brighton
- Education: St. John's College, Cambridge
- Religion: Christian
- Church: Anglican Church
- Ordained: 1820

Richard Burgess (4 December 1796 – Brighton, 12 April 1881) was a biblical scholar, theologian, antiquarian and traveller.

== Biography ==
Richard Burgess was born on 4 December 1796.

He was a biblical scholar and theologian, educated at St. John’s College, in Cambridge, from where he graduated with a Bachelor of Divinity.

He was ordained deacon in 1820 and three years later, in 1823, priest by Dr. Vernon-Harcourt, then the archbishop of York. In 1828 he was domestic chaplain to Lord Aylmer, and chaplain to the English residents at Geneva. In 1831 he became chaplain to the Church of England's congregation at Rome. In 1836 he was made rector of Upper Chelsea. He continued his incumbency for twenty-five years. In 1861 a testimonial worth 1,200 pounds sterling was presented to him by his parishioners and friends. In 1869 the later Prime Minister of the United Kingdom William Gladstone presented him, on behalf of the crown, to the rectory of Horningsheath-with-Ickworth, near Bury St. Edmunds, and the prebendal stall of Tottenhall in St. Paul's Cathedral was conferred upon him in 1850.

He died on 12 April 1881 at Brighton, aged 84.

Burgess was honorary secretary to the Foreign Aid Society, honorary member of the Royal Institute of British Architects, corresponding member of the Pontifical Archæological Academy at Rome, and for eight years the honorary secretary to the London Diocesan Board of Education. He was deeply interested in the subject of national education, and wrote several articles on national schools, school teachers, education by rates or taxes, besides letters to Sir James Graham, Sir George Grey, Dr. Hook, the Bishop of London, and the Archbishop of Canterbury, on kindred subjects. He was a voluminous writer.

== Travel to Greece and the Levant (1834) ==
In 1834, when Burgess was serving as a chaplain in Rome, he was asked to accompany three scions of the British aristocracy on their Grand Tour to Greece and Asia Minor, as teacher. Namely, the sixteen-year-old George Paget, the eighteen-year-old Thomas Knox –who was the son of his friend and fellow student Thomas Knox– and the twenty-one-year-old Irishman John Butler-Clark-Southwell-Wandesford.

Their journey began in Naples, Italy on 18 April 1834 and ended, 150 days later, in Vienna. It was well planned by Burgess himself so that the young aristocrats would visit the most important ancient sites of classical Greece, Asia Minor and Constantinople. Having studied the routes followed by previous travellers of the same area –such as Lord Byron, his fellow clergyman Thomas Hughes, Colonel William Martin Leake, and the physisian Henry Holland– and influenced by their vivid descriptions of Epirus, Burgess included this region in his journey despite the fact that the satrap Ali Pasha, who offered safety and rich hospitality to those European travellers who decided to visit his pashalik, had been murdered twelve years earlier.

After a seven-day journey, Burgess and his young pupils arrived at Otranto. They boarded the ship Zakynthos, said goodbye to the Italian coast an hour and a half before sunset on 28 April 1834 and in thirty-three hours they arrived in the port of Corfu, on 30 April, half an hour before dawn on Holy Wednesday. Twenty years had already passed since the Treaty of Vienna and the annexation of the Ionian Islands to the British Empire. Christians were preparing to celebrate Easter. The relic of Saint Spyridon was exhibited for pilgrimage in his church and, as usual, the litany took place in the city on Holy Saturday. Burgess reports that in Corfu there were two synagogues that served the approximately 2,000 Jews of the city.

After Corfu and Epirus, Burgess continued his journey to the rest of the Eptanisa, they then visited Patras, Aigio, Amfissa, Delphi, Arachova, Corinth, Nemea, Mycenae, Nafplio, Argos, Mantineia, Megalopolis, Karytaina, Andritsaina, Bassae, Leonidio, Mystras, Sparta, Epidaurus, Aegina, Athens, Marathon, Sounio and from Piraeus they travelled to many islands of the Cyclades before crossing to the coast of Asia Minor and finally reaching Constantinople.

His travelogue of the wider Greek area, entitled Greece and the Levant, or Diary of a Summer's Excursion, was first published in 1835 and the reviews for it were immediately positive and extensive.

== Published works ==
Richard Burgess wrote the following books:

- A City for the Pope, or the Solution of the Roman Question, London, 1800.
- Description of the Circus on the Via Appia near Rome, with some account of the Circensian Games, London, 1828, which was translated into Italian in 1829 by Giuseppe Porta.
- The Topography and Antiquities of Rome, including the recent discoveries made about the Forum and the Via Sacra, 2 volumes, London, 1831.
- Lectures on the Insufficiency of Unrevealed Religion, and on the succeeding influence of Christianity, delivered in the English Chapel at Rome, London, 1832.
- Greece and the Levant, or Diary of a Summer's Excursion, 2 volumes, London, 1835.
- An Enquiry into the state of the Church of England Congregations in France, Belgium, and Switzerland, London, 1850.
- Sermons for the Times, London, 1851.
- The Confessional, London, 1852.
- Constantinople, and Greek Christianity, London, 1855.

He also published the following articles:

- «On the leonine city - Vatican», in: Papers read at the Royal Institute of British Architects; Session 1861-62, London, 1862, pp. 140-148.
- «On the water supply of ancient and modern Rome», στο: Papers read at the Royal Institute of British Architects; Session 1865-66, London, 1866, pp. 103-113.
- «Stamboul and the Bosphorus», στο: Papers read at the Royal Institute of British Architects; Session 1868-69, London, 1869, pp. 208-221.

An extensive list of his writings can be traced through the Global Catalog of Library Materials.

== Sources ==
- Aldrich, Richard (1980). "National Education, by Rates or Taxes". Journal of Educational Administration and History. 12.1. London: 25–30.
- Burgess, Richard (1835), Greece and the Levant; or, Diary of a Summer's Excursion in 1834: With Epistolary Supplements, London
- Burgess, Richard (1862). "On the leonine city - Vatican". Papers read at the Royal Institute of British Architects; Session 1861-62. London: 140–148.
- Horn, Joyce M. (1969), Fasti Ecclesiae Anglicanae 1541-1857: volume 1: St. Paul’s, London, London
- Karabelas, Nikos D. (2011). "William Goodison and Richard Burgess. Two less known travellers in Preveza and Nicopolis". Prevezanika Chronika (Πρεβεζάνικα Χρονικά) (in Greek). 47-48 (2011). Preveza: 138–198. doi:10.12681/PRCH.28558. ISSN 1105-753X.
- Mew, James (1886). "Burgess, Richard". In Leslie, Stephen (ed.). Dictionary of National Biography. Vol. VII. pp. 312–313.
