= Ada Whiting =

Australian oil and watercolour painter and miniaturist (1898 - 1944)

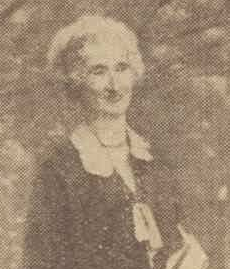
- Ada Whiting, Sydney, 1934
- Born: Ada Clara Cherry; 1859; Hobart, Tasmania
- Died: 1953 (aged 93–94); North Brighton, Melbourne
- Known for: Miniature portraits
- Notable work: Miss Jessica Harcourt
- Spouse: Saville Whiting

Ada Clara Whiting nee Cherry was an Australian oil and watercolour painter and miniaturist. She was active from 1898 to 1944, and received prestigious commissions to paint vice regal representatives, prominent members of society and celebrities, in Melbourne and later Sydney.

== Biography ==
Ada Clara Whiting (1859-1953) was born Ada Clara Cherry in Hobart, Tasmania. She was the second-eldest of five children of the English-born photographer, artist and miniaturist George Cherry and Mary Ann Mathilda (née James). After the early death of her parents, Whiting moved to Geelong with her siblings, where she attended the Geelong Technological School and School of Drawing. In 1874, she was awarded first prize for figure drawing and in 1879 she received prizes for flowers in nature and shells. Whiting's work was also included in the Melbourne School of Design's exhibitions at the Academy of Arts in 1877.

Whiting obtained work with the photographic studio Johnstone, O'Shannessy and Co, hand-colouring photographs. She married photographer Saville Whiting in 1888. Her husband had also been employed at Johnstone, O'Shannessy and Co. After a difficult marriage and two children, they eventually divorced in 1899, with Whiting citing "desertion and habitual drunkenness" as the causes. Whiting had already found a studio and was working to support herself and her children as early as 1893.

== Achieving notability ==
Whiting's father had known Arthur Streeton and it is possible that Streeton suggested she try her hand at miniatures. She acquired the skills necessary, including "stippling with a camel hair brush", and she achieved notability, which was commented on regularly during her career, when one of her early miniatures was exhibited at the Royal Academy in London in 1900. Painting miniatures was time-consuming, but Whiting was known for working quickly and her watercolour miniatures on ivory were greatly admired. She usually only required a small number of sittings and was adept at painting from photographs, including portraits of people who had died. The latter sort of commission was quite common.

In 1900, she was exhibiting at the Albert Street Galleries in Fitzroy, and her miniatures were regarded as being worthy of the name "miniature" and were regarded as "daintily pretty". By 1901, Whiting had established her studio on Collins Street, Melbourne. Her success at the Royal Academy resulted in a steady stream of commissions from influential people, and her skill in creating miniatures was widely recognised.

In 1902, it was noted in the Melbourne newspapers she was undertaking a number of commissions, mostly of children from prominent families.

In 1904, the then National Art Gallery, Sydney (now known at the Art Gallery of NSW), was exhibiting a small set of her miniatures and in 1905 acquired three of these for their collection, including one of Miss Ruby Webb.

In 1909, Whiting was invited to submit works for the Federal Art Exhibition in South Australia, with her four miniature pictures being regarded as "all that can be desired in this delicate branch of art".

From 1915, Whiting continued to exhibit and receive prestigious commissions. with regular complimentary references in the newspapers of the day, such as: "Mrs Whiting ... stands at the head of her profession in the miniature branch of portraiture". Those regular references would have been an important part of maintaining her reputation as a skilled miniature portrait painter in the minds of potential clients. She regularly visited her son Saville in Sydney, and received commissions to paint members of the wealthy Australia Hordern dynasty, as well as the daughter of the NSW Governor.

Whiting received many prestigious commissions to paint miniatures, including ones of the great Victorian art benefactor Alfred Felton and the Earl of Linlithgow.

== Whiting and Dame Nellie Melba ==
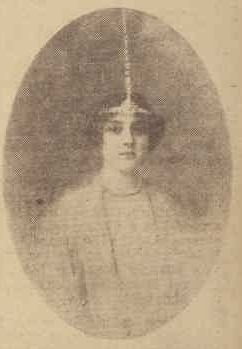
1903 miniature of Dame Nellie Melba

As well as the many miniatures quite regularly completed of and for Dame Nellie Melba, in 1903, Whiting had completed two further miniature of Melba, who was regarded as a close friend A newspaper columnist for the Arena-Sun, Melbourne described Whiting as being "the most accomplished of the Melbourne practitioners of the art", with one of her miniatures to be given to one of Melba's friends, Miss Violet Clarke, the daughter of the then State Governor. In 1904, Whiting received a message from Melba in Paris, asking her to paint her father, David Mitchell. Despite his initial objection to sitting for a portrait, it was quickly completed and was dispatched to Melba in London. Melba regarded the miniature as her "dearest treasure". Melba also commissioned a miniature of author Beverley Nichols, which she took to London for his mother. One of the miniatures painted by Whiting, completed in 1919, was of Melba in one of her famous tiaras wearing "a lace gown with camellias which she had first worn when she performed La Traviata."

Whiting never travelled abroad, despite being encouraged by clients such as Melba, who offered influential introductions, and the arts writer for one of Melbourne's newspapers expressed the wish that Whiting had had "a wider field of action". Melba continued her patronage and, when interviewed by The Argus on the eve of her departure for London in 1919, she spoke of her friendship with Whiting saying: "I have had some miniatures painted by Mrs Whiting and they are very beautiful. She talks of coming to London. I hope she will." Whiting also completed a miniature of Melba's granddaughter Pamela, which was "a dainty bijou carried off in Melba's suitcase like a mascot".

== Later years ==
Despite the waning of interest in the miniature, Whiting continued to receive commissions and regularly exhibited, with mentions of her participation in the annual exhibitions of the Victorian Society of Artists in 1925, 1926, 1930 and 1933. In 1934, Whiting was invited to send her work to the Paris Salon. She included her portrait of "Australia's loveliest girl", Jessica Harcourt. Whiting mostly gave up painting miniatures when her eyesight started to trouble her, although she used a magnifying glass for commissions, and completed a miniature in 1944. Almost until her death in 1953, Whiting was painting larger works, mostly flowers in oils.

She died at the home of her son, Saville Whiting, in North Brighton, Melbourne.

== Exhibitions ==
- 1896-1916: Victorian Society of Artists
- 1900: Royal Academy London
- 1905: Royal Art Society, Melbourne
- 1909: Federal Art Exhibition, South Australian Society of the Arts
- 1917: Royal Scottish Academy
- 1934: Royal Hibernian Academy
- 1934: Paris Salon

== External sources ==
Works are in the collections of:

- Miss Ruby Webb, 1905. Art Gallery of NSW
- Miss Jessica Harcourt, 1925. Finalist, Archibald Prize, 1925
- National Gallery of Victoria
- Australiana Magazine, November 2009
- Portrait of Ada Cherry, 1863 by her father George Cherry
- "Portrait of Ada Cherry, ca. 1860" by her father George Cherry.
