= General Forestier-Walker =

General Forestier-Walker may refer to:

- Edward Forestier-Walker (1812–1881), British Army general
- Frederick Forestier-Walker (1844–1910), British Army general
- George Forestier-Walker (1866–1939), British Army major general
