= Thomas Knox, 3rd Earl of Ranfurly =

Irish politician

The Right Honourable The Earl of Ranfurly

Member of Parliament for Dungannon
- In office 1838–1851
- Preceded by: Thomas Knox
- Succeeded by: William Knox

Personal details
- Born: 13 November 1816
- Died: 20 May 1858 (aged 41)
- Spouse: Harriet Rimington (m. 1848; died 1858)
- Relations: William Stuart (grandfather)
- Children: 3
- Parent(s): Thomas Knox, 2nd Earl of Ranfurly; Mary Juliana Stuart
- Education: St John's College, Cambridge

Thomas Knox, 3rd Earl of Ranfurly (13 November 1816 – 20 May 1858), styled Viscount Northland between 1840 and 1858, was an Irish peer and member of parliament.

== Early life ==
Knox was born on 13 November 1816 as the eldest son of Thomas Knox, 2nd Earl of Ranfurly and his wife Mary Juliana Stuart, Among his siblings were William Knox, Lady Mary Stuart Knox (wife of John Page Reade), Lady Louisa Juliana Knox (wife of Henry Alexander), and Lady Juliana Caroline Frances Knox (wife of Gen. Sir Edward Forestier-Walker).

His paternal grandparents were Thomas Knox, 1st Earl of Ranfurly, and the Hon. Diana Jane Pery (a daughter of the 1st Viscount Pery). His maternal grandparents were the Most Reverend William Stuart, Archbishop of Armagh, and the former Sophia Margaret Penn (the daughter of Thomas Penn and granddaughter of William Penn, founder of Pennsylvania).

He was educated at St John's College, Cambridge.

In 1834 he travelled on a Grand Tour to Greece and Asia Minor under the supervision of Rv. Richard Burgess, together with John Butler Clarke (1813-1856), and George Paget.

== Career ==
He succeeded his father to represent Dungannon as a Member of Parliament between 9 June 1838 and 3 February 1851, when he resigned through the position of Steward of the Chiltern Hundreds due to ill health. He was succeeded by his younger brother, William.

He succeeded to the title of 4th Baron Welles of Dungannon, County Tyrone on 21 March 1858, as well as the title of 3rd Earl of Ranfurly, the title of 3rd Baron Ranfurly of Ramphorlie, County Renfrew, and the title of 4th Viscount Northland of Dungannon, County Tyrone. He continued as earl for only two months, dying on 20 May 1858.

== Personal life ==
On 10 October 1848, he married Harriet Rimington (1824–1891), daughter of James Rimington and Sarah Ward. Together, they were the parents of:

- Thomas Granville Henry Stuart Knox, 4th Earl of Ranfurly (1849–1875), who died unmarried.
- Lady Agnes Henrietta Sarah Knox (1851–1921), who married Nugent Murray Whitmore Daniell, a son of James F. N. Daniell of Sandown House, Esher, in 1870.
- Uchter John Mark Knox, 5th Earl of Ranfurly (1856–1933), who married Hon. Constance Elizabeth Caulfeild, the only child of James Caulfeild, 7th Viscount Charlemont and Hon. Annetta Handcock (a daughter of 3rd Baron Castlemaine), in 1880.

Lord Ranfurly died on 20 May 1858 and was succeeded in his titles by his eldest son Thomas. After his death on a shooting expedition at Abyssinia at age 25, the titles passed to the 3rd Earl's younger son, Uchter. His widow, the dowager Lady Ranfurly, died on 16 March 1891. The 5th Earl sold Northland House in Dungannon and the family's other possessions in County Tyrone in 1927 due to "heavy post-war taxation".

Parliament of the United Kingdom
Preceded by Thomas Knox	Member of Parliament for Dungannon; 1838–1851	Succeeded by William Knox
Peerage of Ireland
Preceded by Thomas Knox	Earl of Ranfurly; March–May 1858	Succeeded by Thomas Knox
