= Johnstone, O'Shannessy and Co =

Photography studio

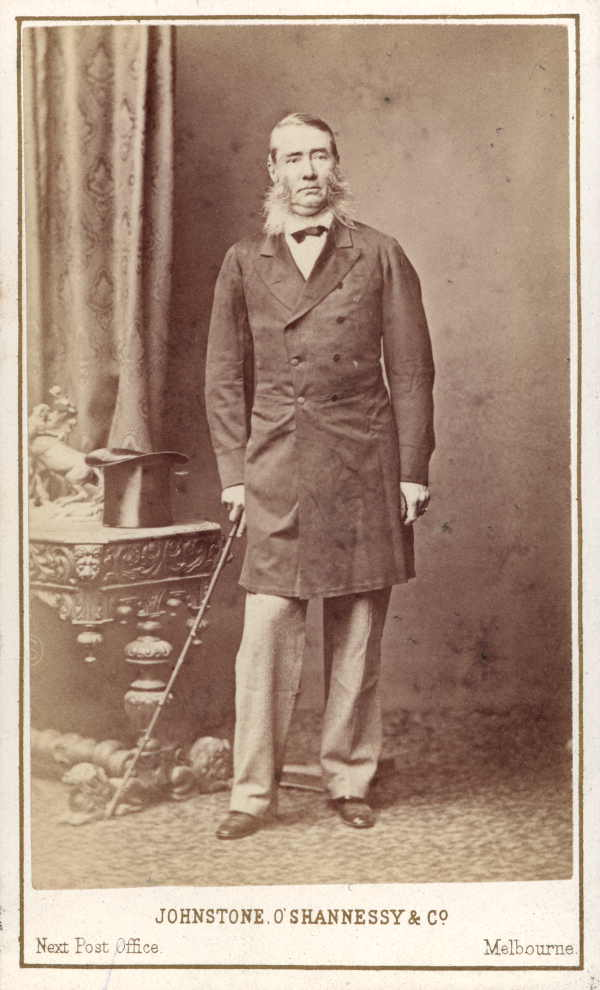
3rd Viscount Canterbury, Governor of Victoria from 1866 to 1873

Johnstone, O’Shannessy & Co was a leading photographic studio located in Melbourne, Victoria, Australia. It was active from 1865 to 1905.

== History ==
Henry James Johnstone was born in Birmingham, England, in 1835 and studied art under a number of private teachers and at the Birmingham School of Design before joining his father's photographic firm. He arrived in Melbourne in 1853 aged 18 and became Melbourne's leading portrait photographer during the 1870s and 1880s. In 1862 he bought out the Duryea and MacDonald Studio and started work as Johnstone and Co. In 1865 the firm became Johnstone, O'Shannessy and Co. with partner Emily O’Shannessy and co-owner George Hasler.

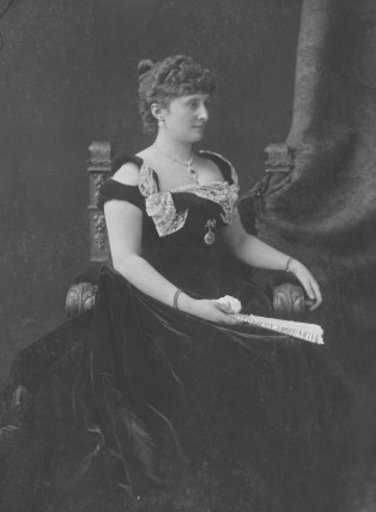
Lady Constance Knox, daughter of the 5th Earl of Ranfurly, Governor of New Zealand. 1899

Johnstone, O’Shannessy & Co. were Melbourne's leading portrait photographers whose services were sought by governors, visiting royalty, politicians and other prominent members of society. Johnstone impressed the Duke of Edinburgh during his visit to Victoria and was appointed to his staff as Royal Photographer.

Examples of Johnstone, O’Shannessy & Co.’s photographic portraits were included in the Philadelphia Centennial Exhibition of 1875 and the 1888 Melbourne International Exhibition where the excellence of their work was noted by the judges.

== Artistic activity ==
Johnstone was also a prominent artist. After studying with sculptor Charles Summers and then joining Louis Buvelot's painting school in 1867, he joined the Melbourne National Gallery School of Painting under Thomas Clark. He became a member of the Victorian Academy of Arts in 1871, and a member of the Society of British Artists.

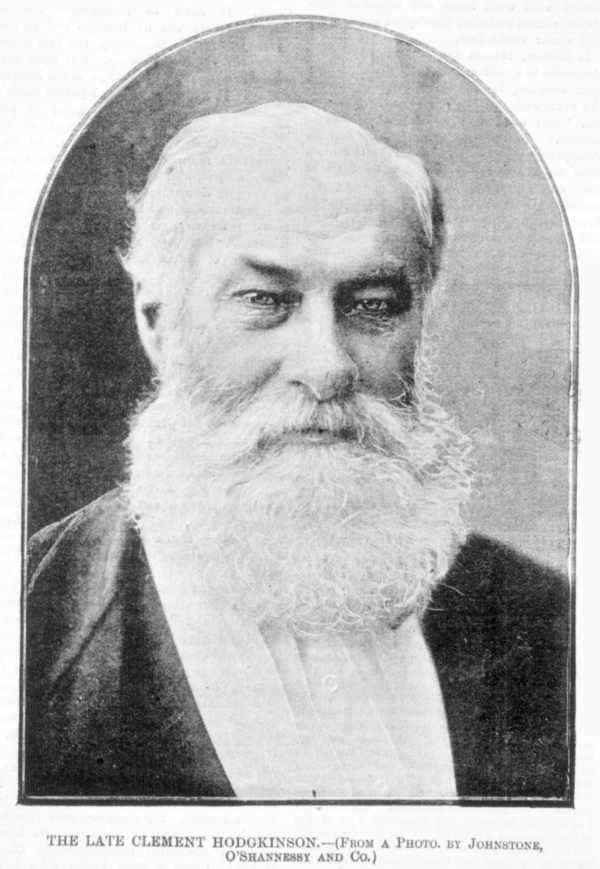
Clement Hodgkinson, Victorian Assistant Commissioner of Crown Lands and Survey from 1861 to 1874, c.1893

== Decline ==
In 1876 Johnstone left Melbourne for South Australia and then travelled extensively in America, and then in 1880 to London, where he regularly exhibited paintings at the Royal Academy until 1900. He died in London in 1907 aged 72.

The firm continued without him and expanded to Sydney during the 1880s and occupied a variety of buildings in Melbourne until the 1890s, but the firm's fortunes declined during the economic downturn of the following decade. George Hasler, who created a printing process called Neogravure, ran the company till his death in 1897, after which his son-in-law, Rupert De Clare Wilks, took over the company from 1897 until 1905 when he put it into liquidation.
