= James Caulfeild, 8th Viscount Charlemont =

Irish peer and politician in Northern Ireland

James Caulfeild

Representative peer for Ireland
- In office 1918–1949

Minister of Education of Northern Ireland
- In office 1926–1937

Leader of the Senate of Northern Ireland
- In office 1926–1937

Personal details
- Born: 12 May 1880 London, England
- Died: 20 August 1949 (aged 69)
- Spouse(s): Evelyn Hull (m. 1914; div. 1940) Hildegarde Slock-Cottell (m. 1940)
- Relatives: James Caulfeild (uncle)

James Edward Caulfeild, 8th Viscount Charlemont, PC (NI), DL (12 May 1880 – 20 August 1949) was an Irish Peer, elected to the British House of Lords as a Representative Peer and to the Parliament of Northern Ireland as a Senator. He sat in Stormont's upper house from 1925 to 1937 and was Minister for Education for all but the first of his years.

== Early life ==
Lord Charlemont was born in London to an Irish family, son of the Hon. Marcus Caulfeild, CB, and Gwyn Williams (granddaughter of Sir Robert Williams, Bart.).

He was educated at Winchester College.

== Career ==
He inherited the Viscountcy of Charlemont and Barony of Caulfeild from his uncle, James, in 1913. In 1918 Lord Charlemont was elected to the British House of Lords as a Representative Peer and to the Parliament of Northern Ireland as a Senator. He sat in Stormont's upper house from 1925 to 1937 and was Minister for Education for all but the first of his years.

He was the first President and co-founder of The Irish Association for Cultural, Economic and Social Relations.

== Personal life ==
Lord Charlemont was twice married. He was married first to Evelyn Fanny Charlotte Hull of Park Gate House, Surrey, a daughter of Edmund Charles Pendleton Hull of Ham Common, Surrey, on 26 November 1914. They divorced in April 1940, shortly before she was killed in October 1940 in London during an air raid during World War II.

Shortly before his first wife's death, he married Hildegarde Slock-Cottell, a daughter of Rodolphe Slock-Cotell of Belgium, in July 1940. Lord Charlemont lived at Newcastle, County Down.

Having no children, the titles passed on his death to his cousin.

Political offices
Preceded by The Earl of Rosse	Representative peer for Ireland; 1918–1949	Office lapsed
Preceded by The Marquess of Londonderry	Minister of Education; 1926–1937	Succeeded by John Hanna Robb
Preceded by The Marquess of Londonderry	Leader of the Senate of Northern Ireland; 1926–1937	Succeeded by John Hanna Robb
Peerage of Ireland
Preceded by James Alfred Caulfeild	Viscount Charlemont; 1913–1949	Succeeded by Charles Edward St George Caulfeild
