= Henry Jones (photographer) =

Commercial photographer in Victoria and South Australia

Henry Jones (1826 – 18 October 1911) was a photographer remembered for his portraits of pioneer settlers of South Australia. He was the father of the organist T. H. Jones.

== History ==
Henry was born in Bristol, England, trained as watchmaker and jeweller, and some time in the early 1850s migrated to Victoria, where he set up in business in Bourke Street, Melbourne; by 1855 he was at 125 Elizabeth Street. The following year he moved to Nelson Parade, Williamstown, and from around 1857 was augmenting his watchmaking and jewellery income with photographic portraits on glass.

In 1858 he went into business as "photographic artist", with a studio at 107 Elizabeth Street. From March 1859 to 1 October 1859, when it was dissolved, the business was a partnership "Jones & Baker", of R. A. Jones, who may have been a brother, and one B. Baker. Then they had two competing, or complementary, businesses: Henry at 107 Elizabeth Street, "next to Williams's Dining Rooms", and R. A. Jones at 127 Elizabeth Street, "opposite the Post Office". In July 1860 Henry Jones took over two photographic studios at 9 and 41 Collins Street west, "opposite Criterion Hotel", which had been briefly operated by John Noone (1820–1893), who had succeeded John Walter Osborne (1828–1902) as Government Photographer. In July 1862 he sold the Bourke Street business; the Elizabeth Street business continued to operate under the same name until the end of October 1865.

In 1866 he left for Adelaide, where in July he joined the staff at Townsend Duryea's studio, established in 1855 upstairs 68 King William Street, at the corner of Grenfell Street. In February 1868 he left Duryea and was working for B. Goode at 69 Rundle Street. He opened a studio on King William Street, opposite the Town Hall.

In April 1872 he opened a new studio at 85 King William Street between Currie Street and Waymouth Street "opposite White's Rooms", which for a few years was the only advertised address, until June 1874 when the business operated from both premises, then in January 1876 reverted to just the newer studio.

At the 1871 South Australian Society of Arts exhibition, Jones was awarded a prize for portraits of children, and this became his speciality, reflected in his advertisements. In July 1876 the business was restructured as the "Children's Photographic (later Photograph) Company", with Jones as manager. In September 1880 the business moved to a new studio in Wakefield Street east, near Hutt Street, opposite Oliver’s Timber Yard. By January 1885 the Children’s Photograph Company had moved to the northern corner of King William Street and Hindley Street, previously the studio of the Melbourne Photographic Company. By 1886 the studio had been taken by R. Laming, and around 1890 by Stump & Co., the name by which that corner (like the Beehive Corner opposite), became a familiar landmark.

Henry Jones died on 18 October 1911, and was buried in the West Terrace Cemetery.

Old Colonists mosaics

In 1871 Emanuel Solomon called on all colonists who had arrived before 1841 to submit to him their names so he could extend an official invitation to a grand banquet on the occasion of the 35th anniversary of the foundation of South Australia. The event, held at the Adelaide Town Hall on 28 December 1871, was attended by 620 invitees. In March 1872 Jones called on those gentlemen who had been invited to the banquet to present themselves within the first month of the opening of his new studio to have their photographic portrait taken. From June 1872 started on the lady colonists to similarly have their portraits taken. A mosaic of the male photographs was presented to Solomon, but he died before Jones had completed the companion group, almost ten years later. This was in part attributable to the number of female colonists who came forward having swollen to 656, and no doubt Solomon's death made the completion less urgent. The ladies' photographs were technically superior, and were arranged in alphabetical order rather than grouped by date of arrival. The photograph of Mrs Stephens, who arrived in the Duke of York, first of the First Fleet of South Australia, was given special prominence.

Townsend Duryea also made a large mosaic of the male old colonists in 1872, and Hammer & Co. commenced a similar project in 1886.

He also produced two large group photographs of old colonists which had been on display at Public Library, and were in Jones's possession until 1910, when they were purchased as a public gift by T. R. Bowman.

== Other interests ==
Mr. Jones was an ardent Freemason; most noticeably during his Melbourne period as watchmaker and jeweller, when he was a member of the Royal Arch Chapter, Melbourne; his advertisements were adorned with the Star of David and Square and Compasses.

Mr. Jones attended Pirie Street Methodist Church, where his son T. H. Jones was organist and choirmaster, and for some years he acted as librarian for the choir.

== Family ==
He was married to Mary Ann (c. 1830 – 17 September 1904). Their children included:

- Thomas Henry Jones (20 September 1855 – 14 July 1929) was for many years organist and choirmaster of the Pirie Street Methodist Church.
- daughter

A brother, William Thomas Jones (1827 – 23 December 1891) was variously Postmaster, sub-Collector of Customs and Clerk of Court at Port MacDonnell, South Australia for 30 years, then relieved Alfred Searcy as sub-Collector of Customs in Port Darwin where he retired after two years; died from malaria. His eldest daughter Marion Jones (1854– ) married Henry Pinder (1847–1914) in Darwin on 3 October 1894.
