= James Caulfeild, 7th Viscount Charlemont =

Irish peer and soldier

Colonel The Right Honourable The Viscount Charlemont CB JP DL
- Born: James Alfred Caulfeild; 20 March 1830; Loy House, Cookstown, County Tyrone
- Died: 4 July 1913 (aged 83); Drumcairne, County Tyrone
- Spouse: Hon. Annetta Handcock (1858–1888)
- Children: Constance Knox, Countess Ranfurly
- Parent(s): Edward Houston Caulfeild; Charlotte Geale

Colonel James Alfred Caulfeild, 7th Viscount Charlemont CB JP DL (20 March 1830 – 4 July 1913) was an Irish Peer and soldier.

== Early life ==
James Alfred Caulfeild was born on 20 March 1830 at Loy House in Cookstown, County Tyrone. He was the son of Edward Houston Caulfeild and Charlotte Geale (a daughter of Piers Geale, a solicitor of Mountjoy Square). His younger brother, Marcus Piers Francis Caulfeild, was a Major in the Mid-Ulster Artillery Militia.

His paternal grandparents were Hon. Harriet Crofton (a daughter of Sir Edward Crofton, 2nd Baronet and Anne Crofton, 1st Baroness Crofton) and James Caulfeild (the grandson of Rev. Hon. Charles Caulfeild, the second son of Maj.-Gen. William Caulfeild, 2nd Viscount Charlemont). His maternal aunt, Elizabeth Geale, married Hugh Fortescue, 2nd Earl Fortescue.

He was educated in Germany.

== Career ==
At age 18, he entered the Army and fought with the Coldstream Guards in the Crimean War, becoming a captain. He later was made Honorary Colonel in the 3rd Battalion of the Royal Inniskilling Fusiliers.

In 1868, he was Vice-Lord-Lieutenant of County Tyrone and High Sheriff of County Tyrone. He also served as Deputy Lieutenant and Justice of the Peace for County Tyrone. He served as Comptroller of the Viceregal Household in Ireland between 1868 and 1895 and was considered an "ardent Unionist". He was Comptroller of the Household of the Lord-Lieutenant of Ireland between 1868 and 1895.

He held the office of Usher of the Black Rod of the Order of St Patrick between February 1879 and 1913. On 12 January 1892, upon the death of his third cousin once removed, James Caulfeild, 3rd Earl of Charlemont, he succeeded as the 7th Viscount Charlemont, County Armagh as well as the subsidiary title, 11th Baron Caulfield of Charlemont, County Armagh. The earldom, which had been created in 1763 for James Caulfeild, 1st Earl of Charlemont (and 4th Viscount Charlemont), became extinct. He was made a Companion of the Order of the Bath on 25 May 1892.

== Personal life ==
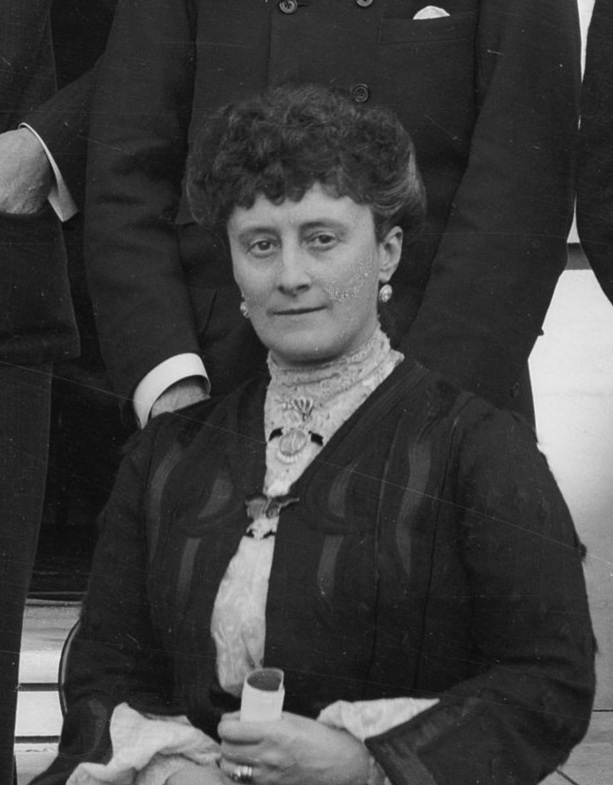
Portrait of his only child, Constance, Countess of Ranfurly, at Government House, Auckland, 1903

On 2 February 1858, Caulfield married Hon. Annetta Handcock (1828–1888) at Athlone Church, Athlone. She was a daughter of Richard Handcock, 3rd Baron Castlemaine and Margaret Harris. Together, they were the parents of one daughter:

- Hon. Constance Elizabeth Caulfeild (1858–1932), who married Uchter Knox, 5th Earl of Ranfurly, a son of the 3rd Earl of Ranfurly and Harriet Rimmington (daughter of John Rimmington, of Broomhead Hall), in 1880.

In the 1890s, Charlemont reportedly bought Coney Island, Lough Neagh, an island in Lough Neagh, Northern Ireland that is about 1 km offshore from Maghery in County Armagh, for £150. The island lies between the mouths of the River Blackwater and the River Bann in the south-west corner of Lough Neagh. He built a summer house there in 1895.

Lord Charlemont died on 4 July 1913 at Drumcairne, just outside Stewartstown in County Tyrone. As he had no sons, the titles passed to his nephew, James Caulfeild.

=== Descendants ===
Through his daughter Constance, he was a grandfather of four, including Thomas Uchter Knox, Viscount Northland (father of Daniel Knox, 6th Earl of Ranfurly), and Lady Constance Gaskell, a Woman of the Bedchamber to Queen Mary from 1937 to 1953 and Lady-in-Waiting to Princess Marina, Duchess of Kent from 1953 to 1960.

Peerage of Ireland
| Preceded by James Molyneux Caulfeild | Viscount Charlemont; 1892–1913 | Succeeded by James Edward Caulfeild |
