= Earl of Ranfurly =

Title in the Irish Peerage

- Arms: Gules, a Falcon volant Or, within an Orle, the outer edge wavy and the inner edge engrailed, Argent. Crest: A Falcon close standing on a Perch proper. Supporters: On either side a Falcon wings inverted proper, ducally gorged, lined, beaked, membered and belled Or.
- Creation date: 14 September 1831
- Created by: William IV
- Peerage: Peerage of Ireland
- First holder: Thomas Knox, 2nd Viscount Northland
- Present holder: Edward Knox, 8th Earl of Ranfurly
- Heir apparent: Edward Knox, Viscount Northland
- Subsidiary titles: Viscount Northland; Baron Welles; Baron Ranfurly (United Kingdom)
- Status: Extant
- Seat: Maltings Chase
- Motto: MOVEO ET PROFICIO (I move and make progress)

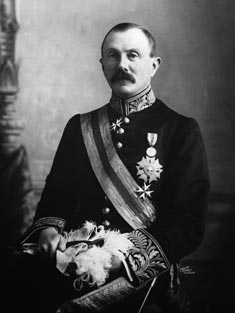
The 5th Earl of Ranfurly.

Earl of Ranfurly, of Dungannon in the County of Tyrone, a title in the Peerage of Ireland, was created in 1831 for Thomas Knox, 2nd Viscount Northland. He had earlier represented County Tyrone in the House of Commons, and had already been created Baron Ranfurly, of Ramphorlie in the County of Renfrew, in the Peerage of the United Kingdom in 1826. Knox was the eldest son of Thomas Knox, who represented Dungannon in the Irish House of Commons. He was created Baron Welles, of Dungannon in the County of Tyrone, in 1781, and Viscount Northland, of Dungannon in the County of Tyrone, in 1791. Both titles were in the Peerage of Ireland. Lord Northland also sat in the British House of Lords as one of the 28 original Irish representative peers.

The first Earl was succeeded by his son, the second Earl. He sat as Member of Parliament for County Tyrone and Dungannon. His son, the third Earl, also represented Dungannon in Parliament. On his early death in 1858, having held the titles for only two months, the peerages passed to his eight-year-old son, the fourth Earl. He also died young and was succeeded by his younger brother, the fifth Earl. He served as a Lord-in-Waiting (government whip in the House of Lords) in the third Conservative administration of Lord Salisbury and became Governor of New Zealand between 1897 and 1904. He also was a member of The Apprentice Boys of Derry Parent Club in Derry.

His grandson, the sixth Earl, mainly known as Dan Ranfurly, became well known for his exploits in the Second World War, and also served as Governor of the Bahamas from 1953 to 1956. His wife Hermione, Countess of Ranfurly, also became well known for her memoirs of her and her husband's lives during the Second World War, and for establishing the organisation which is now known as Book Aid International. They had one daughter but no sons. After his death, the titles passed to his fifth cousin, the seventh Earl. He was the great-great-great-grandson of the Hon. John Knox, third son of the first Earl. As of 2018, the title is held by his son, the eighth earl, who succeeded in that year.

The Hon. William Knox, younger son of the second Earl, served as Member of Parliament for Dungannon.

The earldom of Ranfurly, pronounced "Ran-fully", is the last earldom created in the Peerage of Ireland. Despite its territorial designation and the fact that it is in the Peerage of Ireland, the name of the earldom (like that of the UK barony) references the village of Ranfurly (Scottish Gaelic: Rann Feòirling) in Renfrewshire in the south-west of Scotland.

The Earls of Ranfurly owned a large country estate centred on Dungannon in the south-east of County Tyrone in Ulster, Ireland, from 1692 until the very early twentieth-century.

The family seat is Maltings Chase, a house designed by Ted Cullinan and built in the late 1960s, near Nayland, Suffolk.

== Viscount Northland (1791) ==
- Thomas Knox, 1st Viscount Northland (1729–1818)
- Thomas Knox, 2nd Viscount Northland (1754–1840) (created Earl of Ranfurly in 1831)

== Earl of Ranfurly (1831) ==
- Thomas Knox, 1st Earl of Ranfurly (1754–1840)
- Thomas Knox, 2nd Earl of Ranfurly (1786–1858)
- Thomas Knox, 3rd Earl of Ranfurly (1816–1858)
- Thomas Granville Henry Stuart Knox, 4th Earl of Ranfurly (1849–1875)
- Uchter John Mark Knox, 5th Earl of Ranfurly (1856–1933)
- Thomas Daniel Knox, 6th Earl of Ranfurly (1913–1988)
- Lieutenant-Commander Gerald Francoys Needham Knox, 7th Earl of Ranfurly (1929–2018)
- Edward John Knox, 8th Earl of Ranfurly (b. 1957)

== Present peer ==
Edward John Knox, 8th Earl of Ranfurly (born 21 May 1957) is the son of the 7th Earl and his wife Rosemary Beatrice Vesey Holt. He was educated at The Leys School, Cambridge, and Loughborough University of Technology, where he graduated BA.

He was formally known as Viscount Northland between 1988, when his father inherited the peerages from a distant cousin, and 2018, when he succeeded his father as Earl of Ranfurly, Viscount Northland, Baron Ranfurly of Ramphorlie, and Baron Welles of Dungannon.

In 1980, Knox married firstly, Rachel Sarah Lee, daughter of Frank Hilton Lee, and they were divorced in 1984. In 1994 he married secondly Johannah Humphrey Walton, daughter of Squadron Leader Harry Richard Walton, and they have two children:

- Adam Henry Knox, Viscount Northland (born 1994), heir apparent
- Lady Helen Catherine Knox (born 1996)

In 2003, Knox was living at 9 Parkgate, London SE3.
