= Gerald France =

British politician (1870-1935)

- France in 1917

Member of Parliament for Batley and Morley Morley (1910–1918)
- In office 15 January 1910 – 15 November 1922
- Preceded by: Alfred Hutton
- Succeeded by: Ben Turner

Personal details
- Born: Gerald Ashburner France; 4 August 1870
- Died: 11 February 1935 (aged 64)
- Party: Liberal (Before 1916, 1923–1935)
- Other political affiliations: Coalition Liberal (1916–1922); National Liberal (1922–1923)
- Spouse: Hilda Bainbridge (m. 1898)
- Children: 5
- Parent: James France (father)
- Education: Rydal Penrhos
- Military career
- Allegiance: United Kingdom
- Branch: Royal Navy
- Service years: 1914-18
- Rank: lieutenant
- Unit: Royal Naval Volunteer Reserve
- Conflicts: World War I

Gerald Ashburner France (4 August 1870 – 11 February 1935) was a British businessman and importer and Liberal Party politician.

== Early life and career ==
Gerald Ashburner France was the son of James Ashburner France of Tynemouth and was rooted in the commercial and social life of the North East of England. His home was at Newbiggin Hall, Westerhope in Newcastle upon Tyne. In religion, France was a Methodist and he was educated at Rydal, a boarding school in North Wales founded in the Methodist tradition. In 1898, he married Hilda Bainbridge from Eshott in Northumberland. They had four sons and a daughter.

France had a business career as an agent and importer in the North East. He rose to become governing director of the firm J A France & Co. of London and Newcastle as well as Chairman of Scott & Turner Ltd, a firm of Newcastle tinprinters. During the First World War, France served as a temporary lieutenant in the Royal Naval Volunteer Reserve.

== Political career ==
=== Local politics ===
France became a member of Northumberland County Council in 1903, representing the coal mining area of Prudhoe and was made an Alderman in 1913. He was sometime chairman of the old age pensions committee of the county of Northumberland and also served as chairman of the county's Parliamentary Committee and of its Health Establishment Committee.

=== Parliament ===
France had Parliamentary ambitions. His name was mentioned as a possible Liberal candidate for the seat of Gateshead in 1909 to succeed the Lib-Lab MP, John Johnson but although he was not chosen he was soon selected elsewhere. He entered Parliament at the January 1910 general election when he held the Liberal seat of Morley in the West Riding of Yorkshire by a majority of 4,631 votes over the Unionist in a three-cornered contest. France held his seat at the December 1910 general election when he was returned unopposed.

In 1916, France was appointed as Parliamentary Private Secretary to the President of the Board of Trade, Walter Runciman. He was made a Deputy Lieutenant of Northumberland in August 1932 He was also sometime President of the Gladstone Club.

The Morley constituency was abolished for the 1918 general election and France was adopted as Liberal candidate for the new seat of Batley and Morley. He fought the seat as a Coalition Liberal (as Lieutenant Gerald France) and was not opposed by a Conservative or Independent Liberal. He was presumably awarded the Coalition coupon and in a straight with Labour candidate Ben Turner, France took the seat by a majority of 1,468 votes.

France may have seen the political writing on the wall as he did not defend his seat at the 1922 general election when Batley and Morley fell to Ben Turner for Labour. He did not stand for Parliament again.

=== Elections contested ===
==== UK Parliament elections ====
Date of election	Constituency	Party	Votes	%	Result
1910 (Jan)	Morley	Liberal	8,026	59.0	Elected
1910 (Dec)	Morley	Liberal	Unopposed		Elected
1918	Batley and Morley	Coalition Liberal	13,519	52.9	Elected

=== Other public appointments ===
France was sometime President of the National Commercial Temperance League, a body formed in the 1890s to appeal to the business and professional community in the economic and ethical field of thought to promote temperance. He was also a member of the national executive committee of the Boys' Brigade.

== Death ==
Towards the end of his political career, France's health began to deteriorate. Just before Christmas of 1934, he went to Tenerife on doctors' advice for the benefit of his condition. Back in England in the new year, he was taken to hospital in Newcastle upon Tyne on 21 January where he was kept until he died on 11 February.

Parliament of the United Kingdom
Preceded by Alfred Hutton	Member of Parliament for Morley; January 1910 – 1918	Constituency abolished
New constituency	Member of Parliament for Batley and Morley; 1918 – 1922	Succeeded by Ben Turner
