= Alfred Hutton (politician) =

British politician (1865–1947)

Alfred Eddison Hutton
- Hutton in 1895.

Member of Parliament for Morley
- In office 1892–1910
- Preceded by: Charles Milnes Gaskell
- Succeeded by: Gerald France

Personal details
- Born: 31 December 1865 Eccleshill, West Yorkshire, England
- Died: 30 May 1947 (aged 81)
- Party: Liberal
- Parents: James Hutton (father); Eliza Hutton (mother)
- Education: Mill Hill School, London
- Alma mater: Trinity College, Cambridge, England

Alfred Eddison Hutton (31 December 1865 – 30 May 1947) was a British Liberal politician and manufacturer.

== Background ==
Hutton was born and lived much of his life in Eccleshill, near Bradford on 31 December 1865 the son of James and Eliza Hutton, his father was a wool merchant. He was educated at Mill Hill School and Trinity College, Cambridge. He received a Bachelor of Arts in 1887 and a Master of Arts in 1891.

== Politics ==
In 1892 he was elected as Liberal MP for Morley, in the West Riding of Yorkshire at the general election. The seat had been Liberal since it was created in 1885 and remained so until it was abolished in 1918. In 1910 he retired from the House, not contesting the January general election.

Parliament of the United Kingdom
Preceded by Charles Milnes Gaskell	Member of Parliament for Morley; 1892 – January 1910	Succeeded by Gerald France
