= T. H. Jones =

Australian organist and music teacher

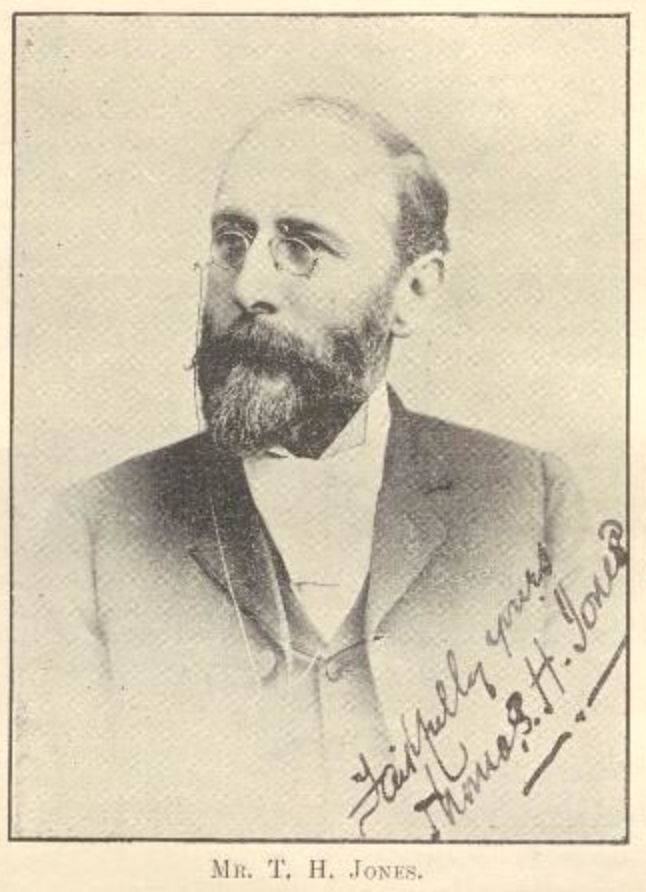

Background information
- Born: 20 September 1855
- Died: 14 July 1929 (aged 73)
- Instrument: organ

Thomas Henry Jones Mus. Bac. (20 September 1855 – 14 July 1929) was a South Australian organist and music teacher.

== Life ==
Jones was born at North Williamstown, Victoria, the only son of noted photographer Henry Jones, and his wife Mary Ann. He was educated at St. Paul's Grammar School, Melbourne and sang with the choir at the English Church at Williamstown. His father was employed by noted photographer Townsend Duryea, and when Duryea transferred his studio to Adelaide around 1865 Henry followed. Thomas attended the German School, Wakefield Street, Adelaide.

He studied piano with Jules Meilhan Jules Meilhan and harmony with S. P. Needham.

With the appointment of Professor Ives, the University of Adelaide was able to offer studies for the Bachelor of Music. Jones enrolled, and in 1889 was the first Mus. Bac. to be awarded in Australia. His examination piece, a cantata, was assessed by Dr. Bridge, organist at Westminster Abbey, in the first class.

He was appointed organist at age 16 to the Baptist Church, Norwood, where H. J. Lambert was the pastor (he married Jones and Vandepeer in 1877), followed by

- Tynte Street church in North Adelaide, where he served for 19 years
- Brougham Place Congregational Church from 1882 to 1902, succeeded by W. R. Knox. The famous Rev. Dr. James Jefferis was incumbent during this period.
- In August 1902 he was persuaded by the Rev. Henry Howard to move to the Pirie Street Methodist church, where he served for 25 years.

He presided at the Adelaide Town Hall organ in 1884, to favorable reviews, and in 1885 performed a series of recitals at the Town Hall. In 1887 he played at a number of concerts in connection with the Adelaide Jubilee International Exhibition. He was considered for the position of City Organist in 1891, but W. R. Pybus won the appointment. Jones succeeded him in 1917, and served until 1923, to be succeeded by Knox.

He conducted the Adelaide Harmonie Society.

In 1898 he started teaching at I. G. Reimann's College of Music, which became the Elder Conservatorium, and was with that organization until 1927, when he left for Perth.

He accompanied Dame Nellie Melba at her first concert in Melbourne.

A popular organist, he was offered a variety of posts, including in 1899 St Mary's Cathedral, Sydney.

He started the North Adelaide School of Music.

Around 1927 he left Adelaide for Perth, where he became organist at St Andrew's Presbyterian Church and married again. He was committed to Point Heathcote Reception Centre early in 1929 after being diagnosed as temporarily insane; he killed himself at age 73 by strangulation shortly before he was due to be released. His wife was chief mourner at his funeral.

== Compositions ==
He collaborated with Rev. Henry Howard in writing a cantata The Miracles of the Lord, which was sung by a 600-voice Methodist choir. He wrote a large number of songs and other minor pieces.

== Family ==
T. H. Jones married soprano Angelina Vandepeer (c. 1858 – 13 August 1926) on 25 December 1877. They had a son and a daughter:

- Elsie Jones (1880–), also a fine soprano, later known as Elsie Rosslyn, married George Horton (of Edwards Branscombe's "Dandies" and the Blind Institution Orchestra).
- Clarence Carlyle Jones (1885–1966), 'cellist, and land broker of Glenelg. He adopted "Carlyle Jones" as his surname.

They had a home "St. Ann's" on South Terrace, Adelaide. He married again on 13 July 1927, in Perth, to his widowed sister in law, Rosetta Blanche "Rose" Johnson-James (nee Vandepeer), a noted music teacher and singer in her own right, and had a home at 170 St. George's Terrace, Perth. His death occurred almost exactly two years later.
