= James Knox (British politician) =

Ulster-Scots Tory politician

Hon. John James Knox (3 April 1790 – 9 July 1856) was an Irish Tory politician of Ulster-Scots descent.

He was the fourth son of Thomas Knox, 1st Earl of Ranfurly (d. 1840), and Hon. Diana Jane Pery, daughter and coheir of Edmund Pery, 1st Viscount Pery. His family was seated at Dungannon in County Tyrone. After a career as an officer in the British Army, he sat in the House of Commons of the United Kingdom in the 1830s as the Member of Parliament (MP) for his family's pocket borough of Dungannon.

Parliament of the United Kingdom
Preceded by Hon. Thomas Knox	Member of Parliament for Dungannon; 1830–1837	Succeeded by Thomas Knox as Viscount Northland
