= Uchter Knox, 5th Earl of Ranfurly =

British politician and colonial governor

The Right Honourable The Earl of Ranfurly GCMG GCStJ PC (Ire) JP DL
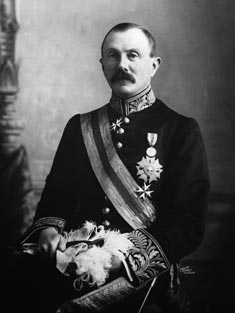

13th Governor of New Zealand
- In office 10 August 1897 – 19 June 1904
- Monarchs: Victoria; Edward VII
- Prime Minister: Richard Seddon
- Preceded by: The Earl of Glasgow
- Succeeded by: The Lord Plunket

Personal details
- Born: 14 August 1856 Guernsey, Channel Islands
- Died: 1 October 1933 (aged 77)
- Spouse: Hon. Constance Caulfeild (m. 1880; died 1932)
- Children: 4, including Constance
- Parent(s): Thomas Knox, 3rd Earl of Ranfurly; Harriet Rimington
- Education: Trinity College, Cambridge

Uchter John Mark Knox, 5th Earl of Ranfurly GCMG GCStJ PC (Ire) JP DL (14 August 1856 – 1 October 1933), was a British politician and colonial governor. He was Governor of New Zealand from 1897 to 1904.

== Early life ==
Lord Ranfurly was born into an Ulster-Scots aristocratic family in Guernsey, the second son of the 3rd Earl of Ranfurly by his wife Harriet Rimmington, daughter of John Rimmington, of Broomhead Hall, Yorkshire. He was educated at Harrow School. Becoming a cadet on board HMS Britannia, he passed for the Royal Navy, but, giving up a naval career, entered Trinity College, Cambridge, at the age of eighteen.

He succeeded in the earldom (and several subsidiary titles) in May 1875 when his elder brother died on a shooting expedition in Abyssinia. His family had owned a large country estate centred on Dungannon in the southeast of County Tyrone in Ulster since 1692.

== Career ==
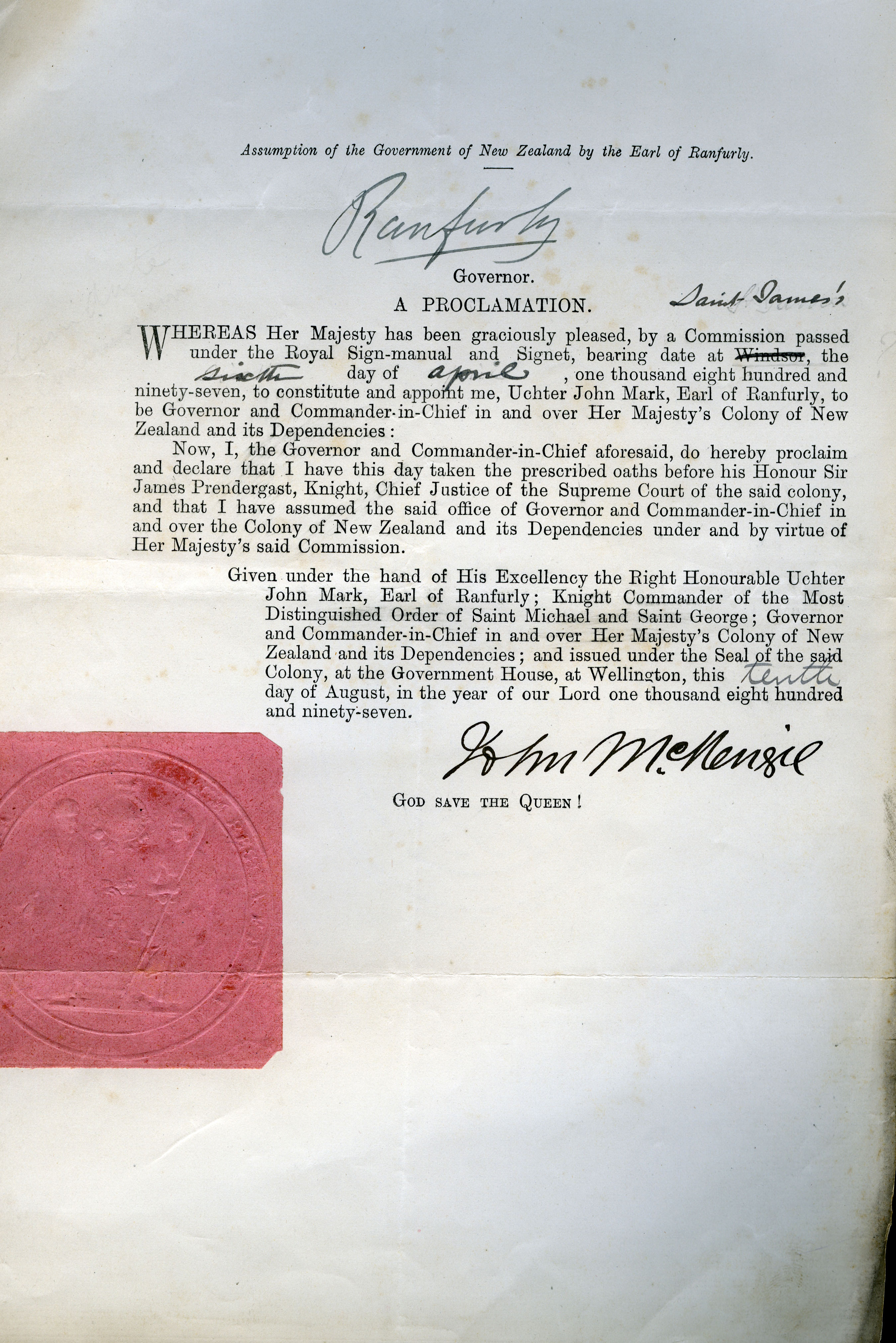
Proclamation announcing Lord Ranfurly taking office as Governor of New Zealand – 10 August 1897

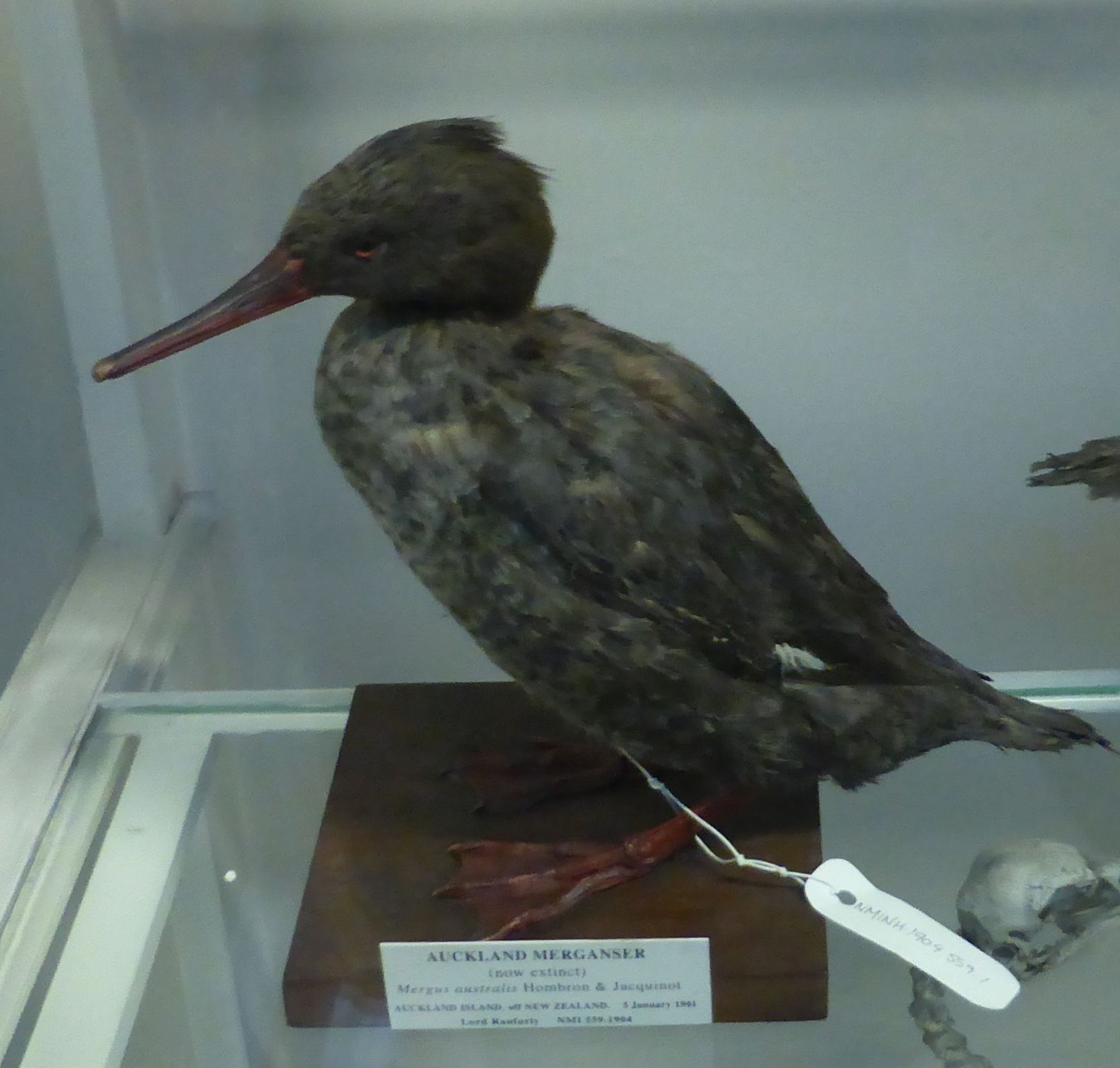
Auckland Island merganser specimen acquired by National Museum of Ireland - Natural History from Lord Ranfurly, 1904

Ranfurly served as a Lord-in-Waiting under Lord Salisbury between 1895 and 1897 and was knighted as a Knight Commander of the Order of St Michael and St George (KCMG) in 1897 for his public services. He was appointed to succeed The Earl of Glasgow as Governor of New Zealand on 6 April 1897, assuming office on 10 August. Lord Ranfurly became Honorary Colonel of the 1st Wellington Battalion (1898) and of the 1st South Canterbury Mounted Rifles (1902). He was created a Knight Grand Cross of the Order of St Michael and St George (GCMG) in June 1901, on the occasion of the visit of TRH the Duke and Duchess of Cornwall and York (later King George V and Queen Mary) to New Zealand. His term ended on 19 June 1904, when he personally handed over office to Lord Plunket. He is remembered for his donation of the Ranfurly Shield, a New Zealand sporting trophy.

On his return to England Ranfurly was made an Irish Privy Counsellor (1905); then for a time, he returned to farm in Mildura, Victoria, Australia. But he soon devoted more and more time to his other great interest, the Order of St. John of Jerusalem. In 1914 he was a Knight of Justice, and Registrar of the Order in London, becoming (1915–19) Director of its Ambulance Department. In 1919 the French Government made him an Officer of the Legion of Honour for his services in this connection during the war.

After the partition of Ireland, Lord Ranfurly was made a Privy Counsellor for Northern Ireland in 1923, also serving as Deputy Lieutenant and Justice of the Peace for his family's native County Tyrone. He continued his association with the Order of St. John, becoming Bailiff Grand Cross in 1926. In 1927, the Earl sold Northland House in Dungannon and the family's other possessions in County Tyrone due to "heavy post-war taxation".

== Personal life ==
On 10 February 1880, Lord Ranfurly married the Hon. Constance Elizabeth Caulfeild, only child of James Caulfeild, 7th Viscount Charlemont and Hon. Annetta Handcock (a daughter of 3rd Baron Castlemaine). They were the parents of four children:

- Lady Annette Agnes Knox (1880–1886), who died young.
- Thomas Uchter Knox, Viscount Northland (1882–1915), who married Hilda Susan Ellen Cooper, a daughter of Sir Daniel Cooper, 2nd Baronet, in 1912. He had been party to a public divorce in 1909.
- Lady Constance Harriet Stuart (1885–1964), who married Maj. Evelyn Milnes Gaskell, son of Charles Milnes Gaskell and Lady Catherine Henrietta Wallop (daughter of the 5th Earl of Portsmouth), in 1905.
- Lady Eileen Maud Juliana Knox (1891–1972), who married Charles Loraine Carlos Clarke, son of Charles Carlos Clarke, in 1914. They divorced in 1935 and she married Peter Stanley Chappell, son of Thomas Stanley Chappell, in 1935. Her first husband later became the father of artist Bob Carlos Clarke.

Lord Ranfurly died on 1 October 1933, aged 77, and was succeeded by his grandson, Daniel Knox, 6th Earl of Ranfurly.

== Legacy and honours ==
Ranfurly in Otago (formerly Eweburn) is named after him.

One of the tiny subantarctic Bounty Islands was named after him: Ranfurly Island.

=== Awards and decorations ===
- Knight Grand Cross of the Order of St Michael and St George (June 1901)
- Privy Counsellor (Ireland) (23 August 1905)
- Officer of the Legion of Honour (France, 1919)
- Privy Counsellor (Northern Ireland) (27 November 1923)
- Bailiff Grand Cross of the Venerable Order of St John (1927)

Political offices
Preceded by The Earl of Buckinghamshire	Lord-in-waiting; 1895–1897	Succeeded by The Earl of Denbigh
Government offices
Preceded by The Earl of Glasgow	Governor of New Zealand; 1897–1904	Succeeded by The Lord Plunket
Peerage of Ireland
Preceded by Thomas Granville Henry Stuart Knox	Earl of Ranfurly; 1875–1933	Succeeded by Thomas Daniel Knox
