= William Knox (MP) =

Irish politician

The Honourable William Knox DL JP

Member of Parliament for Dungannon
- In office 1851–1874
- Preceded by: Viscount Northland
- Succeeded by: Thomas Alexander Dickson

Personal details
- Born: William Stuart Knox; 11 March 1826
- Died: 16 February 1900 (aged 73) Cheltenham, U.K.
- Spouse: Georgiana Rooper (m. 1856)
- Relations: William Stuart (grandfather)
- Parent: Thomas Knox, 2nd Earl of Ranfurly (father)

William Stuart Knox DL JP (11 March 1826 – 16 February 1900) was an Irish politician.

== Early life ==
Knox was the second son of Thomas Knox, 2nd Earl of Ranfurly, and Mary Juliana Stuart. Among his siblings were Thomas Knox, 3rd Earl of Ranfurly, Lady Mary Stuart Knox (wife of John Page Reade), Lady Louisa Juliana Knox (wife of Henry Alexander), and Lady Juliana Caroline Frances Knox (wife of Gen. Sir Edward Forestier-Walker).

His paternal grandparents were Thomas Knox, 1st Earl of Ranfurly, and the Hon. Diana Jane Pery (a daughter of the 1st Viscount Pery). His maternal grandparents were the Most Reverend William Stuart, Archbishop of Armagh, and the former Sophia Margaret Penn (the daughter of Thomas Penn and granddaughter of William Penn, founder of Pennsylvania).

== Career ==
Knox was elected Member of Parliament for Dungannon in 1851 (succeeding his elder brother Viscount Northland), a seat he held until 1874. He was a Groom in Waiting to Queen Victoria in 1852 and 1853.

Commissioned into the 51st Foot, he retired as a major in 1855. From 1867 he was Honorary Colonel in the Mid Ulster Artillery, and he served as a Deputy Lieutenant and Justice of the Peace for County Tyrone.

== Personal life ==
In 1856 Knox married Georgiana Rooper, daughter of John Bonfoy Rooper, of Ripton Hall, Huntingdon, and of Abbots Ripton. They had several children, including:

- Violet Mary Knox (d. 1928), who died unmarried.
- Florence May Knox (d. 1943), who married Col. Albert George Shaw in 1889.
- Thomas Granville Knox (1868–1947), who married Hon. Harriet Georgiana Lucia Agar-Ellis, daughter of Leopold Agar-Ellis, 5th Viscount Clifden and Hon. Harriet Stonor (a daughter of the 3rd Baron Camoys), in 1897.

He died at Cheltenham on 16 February 1900, aged 73. His wife survived him by 26 years and died on 4 November 1926.

Parliament of the United Kingdom
Preceded by Viscount Northland	Member of Parliament for Dungannon; 1851–1874	Succeeded by Thomas Alexander Dickson
