= Townsend Duryea =

American Australian photographer (1823–1888)

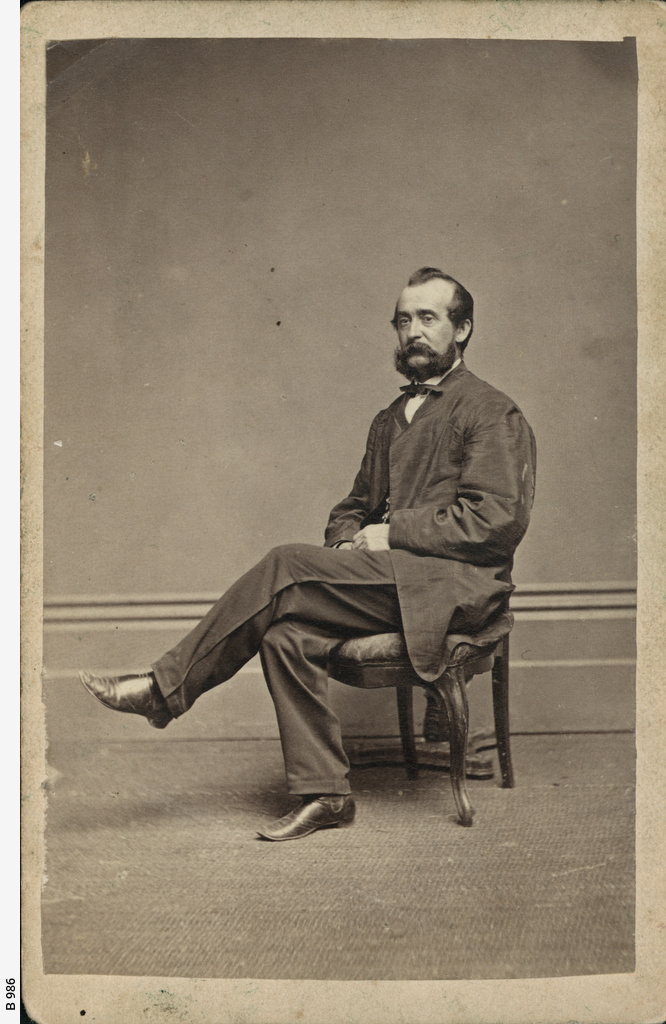
- Born: 1823; Glen Cove, New York, United States
- Died: 13 December 1888 (aged 64–65); Balranald, New South Wales, Australia

Townsend Duryea (1823 – 13 December 1888) and his brother Sanford Duryea (22 February 1833 – 20 March 1903, see below) were American-born photographers who provided South Australians with invaluable images of life in the early colony. Their parents were Ann Bennett Duryea (1795–1882), and Hewlett K. Duryea (1794–1887), a land agent, possibly a member of the family well known for starch manufacture in Glen Cove (often reported as "Glencoe"), Long Island, in New York City.

== Melbourne ==
Duryea arrived in Melbourne in 1852 at the time of the gold rush, but may have despaired of striking it rich, as around September 1853 he set up a partnership with Archibald McDonald as "Duryea and Macdonald, Daguerrean Artists" at 3 and 5 Bourke Street, East and sold their mining equipment. By September 1854 they had opened studios at 9 Collins Street West and advertised their offices at 5 Bourke Street to let. Sanford followed his brother to Australia in 1854.

In 1854 they opened a studio in Geelong and one in Hobart at 46 Liverpool Street on 11 December 1854, and exhibited that same year in the Melbourne Exhibition.

Their partnership was dissolved January 1855 and Duryea was in Adelaide late that month, but the Liverpool Street, Hobart business was still advertising as "Duryea and Macdonald" in April, when Duryea's Adelaide studio was opened. It was in August, at his new Launceston studio, that McDonald began advertising as "Macdonald and Co,".

The Bourke Street business was taken over by Dr. Thomas Adam Hill (died 2 June 1897), then in 1862 bought out by Johnstone and Co., which in 1865 became Johnstone, O'Shannessy and Co with the addition of partner Emily O’Shannessy, and later Scott, Johnstone, & O'Shannessy, who were represented in Adelaide by the Melbourne Photographic Company at 16 Rundle Street.

== Photography business in Adelaide ==
He was soon touting for business (as M. Duryea, presumably to emphasise his French ancestry) at his studio upstairs 68 King William Street, at the corner of Grenfell Street rented from Alexander Hay.

He worked in the prosperous country towns Gawler and Burra in December 1855, when the style of the company changed to "Duryea Brothers", indicating that Sanford was running the business in his brother's absence.

He was in the Clare district around 1856, where he photographed John and Rebecca Ross.

He visited Port Lincoln in August 1857, (assistants perhaps Harvey and Hawson)

Sanford left for Fremantle, Western Australia in 1857

Nixon and Duryea 1857–1859

In 1859 he began supplying photographic materials to other photographers. Soon after, his advertisements described him as a "photographist" rather than a "Daguerrean Artist", the Daguerreotype process having been rendered largely obsolete by the collodiotype, ambrotype and albumen print.

The partnership with Sanford was dissolved 1863

He introduced the Sennotype process, for producing superior tinted photographs, to South Australia.

=== Selected works ===
The achievement for which Duryea is best remembered is his Panorama of December 1865. Taken from the "Albert Tower" of the Town Hall, it is composed of 14 photographs which Townsend made in the course of one day.

In 1866 he commenced another speciality – vignette cartes de visite. One of the first to order was Commodore Sir William and Lady Wiseman.

A notable production, a group photograph of the staff of Harris Scarfe was presented to the founder, George Harris, on his departure for England in 1867.

Townsend Duryea was appointed official photographer for the 1867 visit of Prince Alfred, Duke of Edinburgh, to Adelaide in 1867. He produced a bound booklet to present to His Royal Highness as a souvenir of his visit to Adelaide, and was rewarded with authority to use the slogan "By Royal Appointment".

In August 1868 he commenced a series of portraits of every member of the judiciary and parliament

In 1871 he made a giant mosaic of 520 men attending a banquet given for "Old Colonists" in Adelaide by the merchant Emanuel Solomon (Note: In 1855 Townsend and his wife were charged with conspiring with Solomon's daughter, Elizabeth Dorsetta Solomon (1839–1914) to elope to Melbourne with John Ottis Pierce, a troubadour. She was over 16 but under 21 years, so needed permission from her father, and he had promised her to one Charles Solomon. Miss Solomon married her cousin Samuel Israel Myers (1833–1901) on 24 November 1858, with her father's blessing.) In 1903 a copy of this picture was donated to the Public Library, who made every effort to identify the subjects. A similar set of photographs (one of the men and one of the women) made by H. Jones was presented to the Library in 1910.

Such was the rate of progress in photography in those days that photographs taken by Duryea in 1871, when shown at The Crystal Palace Exhibition in 1879, were criticised for their quality and small size, especially as compared with those of Queensland.

=== The Fire ===
His studio was destroyed by fire early on the morning of Sunday 18 April 1875. The gas main tap had not been turned off, which may have exacerbated the situation, and the storeroom contained flammable chemicals and papers, but the inquest conducted by J. M. Solomon JP could not determine the initial cause. The adjacent buildings (Victoria Chambers on King William Street and the offices of Francis Clark and Sons on Grenfell Street) were saved from severe damage by the Fire Brigade, but the incident prompted calls for a permanent Fire Station. After some dispute, the total of the £1,456/13/4d claimed from his insurers was paid out, but Townsend had lost some 50,000 glass slides of inestimable historic value. Photographs salvaged from the fire were made available to the public by Duryea at the Adelaide School of Photography, 51 Rundle Street, in June 1875.

Townsend Duryea left for Europe late May 1875 to organise re-stocking.

The owner at the time of the fire was George Prince; rebuilding was completed by the following February.

=== After the Fire ===
By November 1875 Nixon had bought the King William Street business and put Manning in as manager.

Manning bought "Duryea's Studio" 1 April 1878 from Nixon. Just prior to this a photograph of Abraham and Matilda Wallace with their daughter Annie was taken in this studio. The Wallaces were described as Pioneers of The South-East.

In the 1890s he began offering enlargements, the use of bromide paper, and use of the "American airbrush" for touching up and colouring.

In 1902 the studio moved to the first floor, 37–39 Rundle Street, previously Mrs Aish's Café de Paris.

In 1911 the company became by amalgamation the Thelma-Duryea studio.

== Other activities ==
=== Boatbuilding ===
Using the experience of boatbuilding he had acquired in America, he built the 30 foot centre-board cutter Coquette, intended for trade on the River Murray and Lake Albert, on Magill Road behind the Maid and Magpie Hotel. Coquette had her first real trial at Wellington against two entirely different classes of boat and failed to show superiority but in a widely anticipated race at Milang on 23 September 1858, she won convincingly against the Lady MacDonnell owned by Hughes and Carter of Wellington. In a return match on 21 October, Coquette led all the way, on each occasion winning for her owner £50. Duryea disposed of the boat by raffle later that year. A later owner was Henry Jackson Moseley, owner of Glenelg's Pier Hotel. In 1865 he fitted a steam engine to her, renamed her Enterprise and used her for collecting oysters.

=== Duryea Mining Association ===
Townsend's original training was as a mining engineer, and formed a company Duryea and Co. which bought several claims at Wallaroo, section 471 being proved highly prospective, having near the surface a seam of some of the richest ore ever found. and a prospectus released by directors Duryea, Edward John Peake SM and George Dehane in April 1861, offering shares to the public. The first General Meeting saw B. T. Finniss elected Chairman in place of the major shareholder, Mr. E. J. Peake. Other directors in 1862 were E. F. Macgeorge, H. C. Gleeson and H. C. Uhlman. The first Secretary, James Litwell Alsop, sacked for neglecting his duties, was nevertheless found not guilty of embezzlement. After three years of indifferent results, the directors sold the mine to the Yorke's Peninsula Company. The mine never showed a profit.

=== Retirement ===
He moved to Yanga Farm near Yanga Lake on the Murrumbidgee River some 13 km from Balranald. He later moved to Parkside, Glen Emu, near Balranald, where he suffered a stroke then died on 13 December 1888, after falling from a buggy in which he was riding with his daughter.

Duryea Street, Balranald may have been named for him or his family.

=== Family ===
Duryea married twice in the United States: to Madelina Paff on 20 March 1844 at Hempstead, Queens, New York and had three children; and Elizabeth Mary Smith about 1854 at Long Island, New York and had five children.

He married Catherine Elizabeth Friggens (1847–1925) on 22 May 1872 at her residence in Adelaide, South Australia and had five children.

His children included:

- Townsend Duryea (born circa 1855) married Catherine MacCorquodale (1863 – 27 Jun 1942), the daughter of Duncan MacCorquodale, on 28 August 1885 at the Unitarian Church, Wakefield Street, Adelaide, Townsend died 14 May 1924 at Port Pirie. He showed promise not only as a photographer, winning various prizes at the Society of Arts, but as an athlete. He exhibited oil paintings at Moonta 1877 He settled in Port Pirie, South Australia in 1910

- Townsend Duryea (27 October 1885 – 19 December 1888) born in Fisherville, South Australia, died Henley Beach
- Alva Duryea (11 January 1888 – ) born in Malvern, South Australia, attended Kyre College (now Scotch College)
- Elvira Jean Duryea (24 February 1890 – ) born in Walkerville, South Australia, married William Percival Allen Lapthorne in Melbourne in 1916
- Victor Roy Duryea (14 February 1892 – 11 November 1957)
- Lance Duryea (10 March 1895 died 15 days later)
- Clyde Duryea (2 March 1898 – 31 May 1963)

- Edwin Duryea (22 May 1857 – 26 August 1945) born in Norwood, South Australia, was a successful student at St. Peter's College in 1868 then moved to North Adelaide Educational Institution (Nesbit & Drew's) in 1870, where his brother Townsend Duryea (jun) was already a successful student. He was a photographer and artist in watercolours. He died in Enfield, South Australia
- Richard L. Duryea (25 October 1859 – 7 May 1951) a prizewinning student at Glenelg Grammar School. was involved in photography. He married in 1927!
- Frank Duryea (1 June 1861 – 31 December 1936), a prizewinning student at Glenelg Grammar. was involved in photography.
- Elizabeth Ann Duryea (22 June 1865 – )

He married Catherine Elizabeth "Kate" Friggens (misreported as "Friggins") (28 November 1847 – 10 November 1925) on 22 May 1872

- Alfred Nixon Duryea (23 December 1874 – 2 November 1949) settled in Balranald, New South Wales and had a large family.
- Alice Duryea (c. 1875 – )
- Catherine P. Duryea (1877–1951) born in Balranald married Ernest Campbell in 1903
- Arthur Duryea (1879–1951) born in Balranald, died in Redfern, New South Wales
- Walter Joseph Duryea (1882–1972) died in Horsham, Victoria

== Associates ==
=== Sanford Duryea ===
Sanford Bennett Duryea (22 February 1833 – 20 March 1903) was born in North Hempstead, Long Island, New York, the son of Hewlett K. Duryea (1794–1887), a land agent, and Ann Bennett Duryea (1795–1882), and brother of Townsend Duryea.

He followed Townsend to Australia, perhaps as late as 1854, working with him and McDonald in Melbourne, Geelong, Hobart and Launceston.

He left Adelaide in 1857 for Western Australia and settled at Mount Eliza near Perth where, on 18 March 1858, he married Ellen Amelia Leeder (2 October 1839 – 16 June 1924) of Perth. and was naturalized by Act of Parliament in 1858. They had a son 1 January 1859 and later that year returned to Adelaide, resuming the partnership with his brother.

His wife had another son on 18 August 1862 in Adelaide, and on 25 April 1863 the Duryea brothers dissolved their partnership. He returned to the US around 1864, living in a town reported as Granthaven (perhaps Grand Haven, Michigan). He ran a photographic studio in 253 Fulton Street, Brooklyn, New York from 1888 to 1890. Another reference gives the address as 297 Fulton Street and has him retiring around 1893. Yet another reference has him running his Brooklyn studio for "a third of a century".

Both Sanford and Ellen died in New York. Their children included:

- Carlton Bennett Duryea (1 January 1859 – 28 September 1911)
- Alice Amelia French Duryea (12 July 1860 – ) later Mrs Herbert Frost
- Hewlett Frederick Duryea (18 August 1862 – 1948)
- Dr. Jesse Townsend Duryea (11 November 1865 – 1927)
- E. Mabelle (Maybelle?) Duryea (31 August 1875 – 25 December 1927) later Mrs Ernest Smith
- Dr. Chester Ford Duryea (22 December 1877 – 7 November 1928)

Note that many Australian newspaper references spelled his name "Sandford", almost certainly erroneously as the Naturalization Act and all US references have "Sanford". His middle name "Bennett" was seldom used in any context, even as an initial.

=== Mary Hübbe ===
Martha Mary Hübbe (1 August 1848 – 27 January 1881), properly Anglicised as "Huebbe" but often "Hubbe", was an artist born in Macclesfield, South Australia who worked in Duryea's studio as a photo-colourist. She was a daughter of Ulrich Hübbe, who was largely responsible for the Torrens Title system of land registration. She married John Hood (see below) in 1871.

=== John Hood ===
John Hood (c. 1839 – 15 May 1924) from Reading, Berkshire or Camberwell worked for Duryea from 1863 to 1869 or perhaps to 1872 He married Martha Mary Hubbe on 18 September 1871. He was appointed drawing master at Glenelg Grammar School from 1873 to 1875 as replacement for Wilton Hack, who had left for Japan. He began working as a photographer in 1880. He was working as photo-colorist for A. A. Stump from 1887. His wife died on 27 January 1881. He married again, on 14 February 1882, to Ruth Wright (née Dollman). He moved to Mosman Bay, Sydney some time around 1900. His son J(ohn) Ulrich Hood was killed in action at Ypres, Belgium on 15 October 1917.

=== Henry Jones ===
Henry Jones (1826 – 18 October 1911) was born in Bristol, England, trained as watchmaker and jeweller, and in 1826 migrated to Victoria, where he opened a jeweller's shop, then diversified to photography professionally. He joined Duryea in Adelaide in 1866, later had his own studio in King William Street, specialising in child portraits. An historic production was the pair of group photographs of old colonists which in 1910 was purchased by T. R. Bowman and donated to the Public Library. His son T. H. Jones was a noted organist and choirmaster.

See main article

=== Henry Spread ===
Henry Fenton Spread (1844–1890) was an Irish painter who worked with the Duryea studio from 1866, using photographs on specially prepared canvas as the basis of his painted portraits. He appears to have stayed with Townsend for around a year, and was replaced by John Hood. He moved to America, where he founded Spread's Art Academy which in 1902 became the Chicago Academy of Fine Arts.

=== K. Bull ===
Knud Geelmuyden Bull (10 September 1811 – 22 December 1889) was a painter born in Bergen, Norway, trained at the University of Copenhagen and at Dresden under Professor Johan Christian Dahl. He was transported to Australia in 1846 for forgery.

He commenced working for Duryea in 1874 on a one-year contract with his virtues lauded in both newspapers (though mistakenly as "R. Bull" in the Register) throughout this time. Late in 1875, he exhibited a large landscape in Townsend's shopfront window. When the Duryea Studio re-opened in October 1875, it was under the auspices of K. Bull, with Charles Manning the operator.

=== Charles H. Manning ===
Charles Henry Manning (c. 1848 – 10 September 1895) was born in England and migrated to Australia, settling in Moonta, South Australia.

He married Emma Louisa Noble of Melbourne on 16 April 1875. She was an accomplished artist; her painting of R. D. Ross being favourably reviewed.

He had a photography business in Moonta, which he advertised for sale in June 1875.

Moved to Marryatville and worked for Nixon (managing "Duryea's Studio") in 1878 and produced a notable photograph of J. Howard Clark. Louisa's skill at colouring photographs was recognised when the photograph of Mrs. R. D. Ross was exhibited at the studio in 1876.

He purchased "Duryea's Studio" from Nixon in April 1878.

He moved to Christchurch, New Zealand in 1887 and purchased a studio at 150 Colombo Street in July 1887. He died by his own hand, having consumed a bottle of silver nitrate.

=== William M. Nixon ===
William Millington Nixon (1 August 1814 – 7 April 1893), was a friend of Townsend Duryea. He was born in Birmingham and came to Australia in the Havilah in 1855. He opened a gunmaker's shop on Grenfell Street in 1855, and for a short time worked with the Duryea Brothers as a photographer, specialising in mother and child portraits then opened his own studio in the Adelaide Arcade. He was the father of Stephen E. Nixon.

He sold his home and extensive property in Stepney in 1858 to farm at Pomonda Point, near Wellington, South Australia, then from c. 1875 at Harborne near Deniliquin and Wanganella, New South Wales.

=== Stephen E. Nixon ===
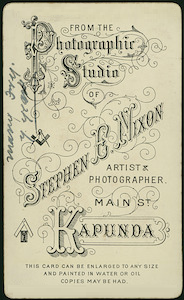
Nixon's business card

Stephen Edward Nixon {10 August 1842 – c. 3 February 1910} was born in Birmingham the eldest son of William M. Nixon. He married Mary Ann Ellis on 2 April 1863. They had sons Charles Millington Nixon (married Annie Blanche Newman) and Stephen Edmond Nixon (married Auguste Lydia Arnold). He was producing photographs in Kapunda, South Australia from before 1865.

In 1871 he was declared bankrupt but in 1874 he produced a series of critically acclaimed photographs depicting mining at Kadina and Wallaroo.

In June 1875 he advertised he was leaving Kadina and selling his photographic business with its two premises. (At the same time Charles H Manning was selling his business in Moonta). He took over the King William Street business (officially "S. E. Nixon's Studio" but popularly referred to as "Duryea's") with Manning as manager from late 1875 to 1878, when he sold the business to Manning.

Nixon moved to Wauraltee, some 6 km south-east of Port Victoria, South Australia, where he declared himself bankrupt in 1880.

Nixon started a photographic business "South Australian Photographic Association" in Kadina sometime before 1883.

Around 1893 he moved to Fremantle, perhaps to be near to his son Charles, who was working as a photographer in the vicinity, then Wagin, Western Australia, where he died.

=== John A. Upton ===
John Alfred Upton was born in 1850 in England and arrived in Melbourne with his family around 1852. He began working as a colorist in watercolours with Duryea's successor in Bourke Street, Dr Thomas A. Hill, being introduced to the technique by Montague Scott, then joined the Adelaide Photographic Company some time before 1867, perhaps as early as 1865. His full-length photographic portrait of the vicar-general, John Smyth, was praised.

Upton was known for painting portraits in oils, among them Pope Pius IX (Note: The stall holders at St Laurence's bazaar, at which this painting was offered for sale, was manned by the "Misses Upton", perhaps sisters of the artist) (died 1878) in 1870, and the Rev. James Maughan in 1871, in 1872 art connoisseur Abraham Abrahams, which was presented to the Art Gallery in 1880, and in 1873 Mr Justice Boothby; it was awarded a gold medal at the London Exhibition of that year. He painted parliamentarian E. T. Smith and philanthropist Dr. William Wyatt in 1874 and in 1875 a posthumous portrait of the mining executive William Shoobridge, who was lost in the wreck of the SS Gothenburg.

After the studio was destroyed by fire, Robert Barr Smith sponsored his studies at the Royal Bavarian Academy of Fine Arts in Munich, where he met with considerable success. His portrait of the author William Howitt (1792–1879) was admired. It is likely that he returned to Adelaide in 1881 with the offer of a position as painting master with the South Australian School of Design, but he never took the position, which has been attributed to failing health. His subsequent death is mentioned in one article, but with no corroborative details. One edition of Alan McCulloch's Encyclopedia of Australian Art contains the assertion that Upton died in Adelaide in 1882, however reports of his subsequent activities cannot be discounted:

In 1883 his portrait of Governor William Robinson was raffled as was in 1887 a small portrait of Bishop Reynolds, or another similar work in 1884, all three for Catholic charities. In no case is there a mention of their vintage, but neither is there any mention of his passing.
In 1886, he painted an altarpiece for St Rose's church in Kapunda then a portrait of Adelaide's ex-mayor William Townsend and around the same time was commissioned to paint another posthumous portrait, of the ophthalmologist Charles Gosse, who died in 1885 after a coach accident.

His painting of a fourteenth-century priest in an attitude of prayer once hung in the Jesuit seminary at Sevenhill, South Australia, and a painting Peasant Girl at the Shrine (1876) and a small painting Girl's Head are held by the Art Gallery of South Australia.

His later history has not yet been resolved. It is likely that he achieved his ambition of revisiting Munich and never returned.

== Sources ==
Townsend Surname in Australia (genealogy site)
