= Captain Sweet =

Australian-bred Thoroughbred racehorse

- Sire: Fastnet Rock
- Grandsire: Danehill
- Dam: Strega
- Damsire: Lake Coniston
- Sex: Gelding
- Foaled: 14 September 2007
- Country: Australia
- Colour: Bay
- Breeder: J. M. Cappellin
- Owner: Louise Hinton
- Trainer: John Moore

Captain Sweet (Chinese: 甜將 ; foaled 14 September 2007) is an Australia-bred, Hong Kong-based retired racehorse. He won five races in the 2010–2011 season. He was one of the nominees for 2010–2011 Hong Kong Horse of the Year. Captain Sweet was owned by Wong Chin Leung during his racing career, but has now been returned to Australia for his retirement. Sharing a paddock with two retired Melbourne Cup runners, he is now enjoying a slower pace of life.

== Background ==
Captain Sweet is a bay gelding, bred in Australia by J. M. Cappellin. He was sired by Fastnet Rock, an Australian sprinter whose progeny include Foxwedge (William Reid Stakes) and Atlantic Jewel (The Thousand Guineas).

== Racing career ==
Based at Sha Tin Racecourse, Captain Sweet has won seven races and over HK$5M in prize money.
