= Thomas Knox, 2nd Earl of Ranfurly =

Anglo-Irish peer and politician

The Right Honourable The Earl of Ranfurly

Member of Parliament for Dungannon
- In office 1818–1830
- Preceded by: George Peter Holford
- Succeeded by: Hon. John James Knox

Member of Parliament for County Tyrone
- In office 1812–1818 Serving with Sir John Stewart, Bt
- Preceded by: Hon. Thomas Knox; Sir John Stewart, Bt
- Succeeded by: Sir John Stewart, Bt; William Stewart

Personal details
- Born: Thomas Knox; 19 April 1786
- Died: 21 March 1858 (aged 71)
- Spouse: Mary Juliana Stuart (after 1815)
- Relations: Edmund Pery, 1st Viscount Pery (grandfather)
- Parent(s): Thomas Knox, 1st Earl of Ranfurly; Hon. Diana Jane Pery
- Education: St John's College, Cambridge

Thomas Knox, 2nd Earl of Ranfurly (19 April 1786 – 21 March 1858), styled Viscount Northland between 1831 and 1840, was an Anglo-Irish peer and politician.

== Early life ==
Ranfurly was born on 19 April 1786. He was the eldest son of Thomas Knox, 1st Earl of Ranfurly, and the Hon. Diana Jane Pery, who were first cousins. His younger brother, Hon. Edmund Knox, was an Admiral in the Royal Navy.

His maternal grandparents were Edmund Pery, 1st Viscount Pery and the former Elizabeth Vesey. His paternal grandparents were Thomas Knox, 1st Viscount Northland, and the Hon. Anne Vesey (a daughter of John Vesey, 1st Baron Knapton). Among his extended family were uncles, Bishop William Knox and Bishop Edmund Knox, George Knox MP, and Archdeacon Charles Knox.

He studied at St John's College, Cambridge.

== Career ==
Ranfurly was returned to Parliament as one of two representatives for County Tyrone in 1812 (succeeding his father), a seat he held until 1818. Between 1818 and 1830 he was the sole representative for Dungannon in Parliament.

He gained the courtesy title Viscount Northland when his father was elevated to the earldom of Ranfurly in 1831. In 1840 he succeeded his father in the earldom and entered the House of Lords as Baron Ranfurly. His residence was Dungannon Park in County Tyrone, Northern Ireland.

== Personal life ==
In 1815, Lord Ranfurly married Mary Juliana Stuart, daughter of the Most Reverend William Stuart, Archbishop of Armagh, and the former Sophia Margaret Penn (the daughter of Thomas Penn, a son of William Penn, founder of Pennsylvania). Together, they had four sons and six daughters, including:

- Thomas Knox, 3rd Earl of Ranfurly (1816–1858), who married Harriet Rimington, a daughter of James Rimington of Broomhead Hall, in 1848.
- Lady Mary Stuart Knox (1818–1903), who married John Page Reade, DL, son of George Reade, in 1854.
- Lady Louisa Juliana Knox (c. 1820–1896), who married Henry Alexander, son of Rt. Hon and Rt. Rev. Nathaniel Alexander, in 1839.
- Lady Juliana Caroline Frances Knox (1820–1906), who married General Sir Edward Forestier-Walker in 1862.
- Hon. William Stuart Knox (1826–1900), a Major in the 51st Foot and MP for Dungannon, who married Georgiana Rooper, daughter of John Bonfoy Rooper, in 1856.
- Hon. Granville Henry John Knox (c. 1829–1845), who drowned while bathing.
- Lady Adelaide Henrietta Louisa Hortense Knox (c. 1834–1911), who married Joseph Goff, son of Joseph Goff of Hale Park, in 1850.

Lord Ranfurly died in March 1858, aged 71, and was succeeded in the earldom by his eldest son, Thomas. Lady Ranfurly died in July 1866.

=== Descendants ===
Through his daughter, Lady Mary, he was a grandfather of Major General Raymond Reade, Commandant of the Royal Military College of Canada.

Parliament of the United Kingdom
Preceded by Hon. Thomas Knox; Sir John Stewart, Bt	Member of Parliament for County Tyrone; 1812–1818; With: Sir John Stewart, Bt	Succeeded by Sir John Stewart, Bt; William Stewart
Preceded by George Peter Holford	Member of Parliament for Dungannon; 1818–1830	Succeeded by Hon. John James Knox
Peerage of Ireland
Preceded by Thomas Knox	Earl of Ranfurly; 1840–1858	Succeeded by Thomas Knox
