= Morley (constituency) =

Parliamentary constituency in the United Kingdom, 1885–1918

- Former borough constituency for the House of Commons

1885–1918
- Seats: one
- Created from: Southern West Riding of Yorkshire
- Replaced by: Batley and Morley (Majority), Dewsbury (Part), Rothwell (Part) and Spen Valley (Part)

Morley was a parliamentary constituency centred on the town of Morley in the West Riding of Yorkshire. It returned one Member of Parliament (MP) to the House of Commons of the Parliament of the United Kingdom, elected by the first past the post system.

The 2023 Periodic Review of Westminster constituencies proposed to re-establish the seat in its revised proposal.

== History ==
The constituency was created when the two-member Southern West Riding of Yorkshire constituency was divided by the Redistribution of Seats Act 1885 for the 1885 general election. It was abolished for the 1918 general election, when it was partly replaced by the new Batley and Morley constituency.

== Members of Parliament ==
Election	Member	Party
1885	Charles Gaskell	Liberal
1892	Alfred Hutton	Liberal
1910 (January)	Gerald France	Liberal
1916	Gerald France	Coalition Liberal
1918	constituency abolished: see Batley & Morley	

== Elections ==
=== Elections in the 1880s ===
General election 1885: Morley
Party	Candidate	Votes	%
Liberal	Charles Milnes Gaskell	6,684	67.8
Conservative	Joseph John Dunnington-Jefferson	3,177	32.2
Majority		3,507	35.6
Turnout		9,861	86.0
Registered electors		11,467	
Liberal win (new seat)			

General election 1886: Morley
Party	Candidate	Votes	%	±%
Liberal	Charles Milnes Gaskell	Unopposed		
Liberal hold				

=== Elections in the 1890s ===
Alfred Hutton

General election 1892: Morley
Party	Candidate	Votes	%	±%
Liberal	Alfred Hutton	5,818	61.4	N/A
Conservative	William Carr	3,656	38.6	New
Majority		2,162	22.8	N/A
Turnout		9,474	71.0	N/A
Registered electors		13,343		
Liberal hold		Swing	N/A	

General election 1895: Morley
Party	Candidate	Votes	%	±%
Liberal	Alfred Hutton	5,834	58.3	−3.1
Conservative	William Carr	4,166	41.7	+3.1
Majority		1,668	16.6	−6.2
Turnout		10,000	75.2	+4.2
Registered electors		13,300		
Liberal hold		Swing	−3.1	

=== Elections in the 1900s ===
General election 1900: Morley
Party	Candidate	Votes	%	±%
Liberal	Alfred Hutton	6,428	62.3	+4.0
Conservative	W.B. Boyd Carpenter	3,888	37.7	−4.0
Majority		2,540	24.6	+8.0
Turnout		10,316	73.4	−1.8
Registered electors		14,049		
Liberal hold		Swing	+4.0	

General election 1906: Morley
Party	Candidate	Votes	%	±%
Liberal	Alfred Hutton	Unopposed		
Liberal hold				

=== Elections in the 1910s ===
General election January 1910: Morley
Party	Candidate	Votes	%	±%
Liberal	Gerald France	8,026	59.0	N/A
Conservative	John Stobart Charlesworth	3,395	24.9	New
Labour	Herbert Smith	2,191	16.1	New
Majority		4,631	34.1	N/A
Turnout		13,612	86.0	N/A
Liberal hold		Swing	N/A	

General election December 1910: Morley
Party	Candidate	Votes	%	±%
Liberal	Gerald France	Unopposed		
Liberal hold				

General Election 1914–15:

Another General Election was required to take place before the end of 1915. The political parties had been making preparations for an election to take place and by July 1914, the following candidates had been selected;

- Liberal: Gerald France
- Labour:
