= Dungannon (UK Parliament constituency) =

UK parliamentary constituency in Ireland, 1801–1885

- Former borough constituency for the House of Commons
- County: County Tyrone
- Borough: Dungannon

1801–1885
- Seats: 1
- Created from: Dungannon
- Replaced by: South Tyrone

Dungannon was a parliamentary constituency of the House of Commons of the Parliament of the United Kingdom in Ireland, returning one MP from 1801 to 1885.

== History ==
Dungannon was an original constituency represented in Parliament when the Union of the Kingdom of Great Britain and the Kingdom of Ireland took effect on 1 January 1801.

It was disfranchised under the Redistribution of Seats Act 1885, which took effect at the 1885 general election. This act split County Tyrone into four single-member constituencies: East Tyrone, Mid Tyrone, North Tyrone and South Tyrone.

== Boundaries ==
This constituency was the parliamentary borough of Dungannon in County Tyrone. It was defined by the Parliamentary Boundaries (Ireland) Act 1832 as:

From the Point on the South of the Town at which the Boundary between the Drumcoo Townland and the Ballynorthland Demesne meets the Boundary of the Parish of Drumglass, Northward, along the Boundary of the Drumcoo Townland to the Point at which the same meets, close by the Gate leading to Mr. Shiel's House in Killymeal, an old Road which leads Westward into the Store Road; thence along such old Road to the Point at which the same joins the Store Road; thence, Northward, along the Store Road to the Point at which the same meets the Cookstown Road; thence in a straight Line to a Point on the Gallows Hill Road which is distant Two hundred and twenty Yards (measured along the Gallows Hill Road) to the West of the Point at which the same leaves the Donaghmore Road; thence in a straight Line in the Direction of the Tower of Derrygortreavy Church to the Point at which such straight Line cuts the Boundary of the Parish of Drumglass; thence, Southward, along the Boundary of the Parish of Drumglass to the Point first described.

== Members of Parliament ==
Election	Member	Party
1801	Hon. John Knox (Note: Knox was returned in the ballot for Irish borough constituencies held in December 1800. However, he had been lost at sea the previous month while on his way to take up the post of Governor of Jamaica. This was not known at the time of the ballot. No writ to replace him was issued until 4 November 1801)	
1801 by-election	Sir Charles Hamilton, Bt	Conservative
1802	Hon. George Knox (Note: At both the 1802 and 1806 elections, George Knox was also returned for Dublin University, and chose to sit for that seat rather than for Dungannon.)	Conservative
1803 by-election	Sir Charles Hamilton, Bt	Conservative
1806	Hon. George Knox	Conservative
1807 by-election	James Hamilton, Viscount Hamilton	Conservative
1807	Lord Claude Hamilton	
1809 by-election	Claude Scott	
1812	George Peter Holford	
1818	Hon. Thomas Knox	Tory
28 December 1830	John James Knox	Tory
December 1834	John James Knox	Conservative
1837	Viscount Northland (2nd)	Conservative
1838 by-election	Viscount Northland (3rd)	Conservative
1851 by-election	William Knox	Conservative
1874	Thomas Alexander Dickson	Liberal
1880 by-election (Note: Thomas Alexander Dickson had been re-elected at the general election in April 1880, but his election was declared void on 10 June 1880)	James Dickson	Liberal
1885	constituency abolished	

== Elections ==
=== Elections in the 1830s ===
General election 1830: Dungannon
Party	Candidate	Votes	%
Tory	Thomas Knox (I)	Unopposed	
Registered electors		13	
Tory hold			

Knox resigned, causing a by-election.

By-election, 28 December 1830: Dungannon
Party	Candidate	Votes	%
Tory	James Knox	Unopposed	
Registered electors		13	
Tory hold			

General election 1831: Dungannon
Party	Candidate	Votes	%
Tory	James Knox	Unopposed	
Registered electors		13	
Tory hold			

General election 1832: Dungannon
Party	Candidate	Votes	%
Tory	James Knox	Unopposed	
Registered electors		154	
Tory hold			

General election 1835: Dungannon
Party	Candidate	Votes	%
Conservative	James Knox	Unopposed	
Registered electors		197	
Conservative hold			

General election 1837: Dungannon
Party	Candidate	Votes	%
Conservative	Thomas Knox (I)	Unopposed	
Registered electors		226	
Conservative hold			

Knox resigned, causing a by-election.

By-election, 9 June 1838: Dungannon
Party	Candidate	Votes	%
Conservative	Thomas Knox (II)	Unopposed	
Conservative hold			

=== Elections in the 1840s ===
General election 1841: Dungannon
Party	Candidate	Votes	%	±%
Conservative	Thomas Knox (II)	72	58.1	N/A
Whig	John Falls	52	41.9	New
Majority		20	16.2	N/A
Turnout		124	63.3	N/A
Registered electors		196		
Conservative hold		Swing	N/A	

General election 1847: Dungannon
Party	Candidate	Votes	%	±%
Conservative	Thomas Knox (II)	Unopposed		
Registered electors		438		
Conservative hold				

=== Elections in the 1850s ===
Knox resigned due to ill health by accepting the office of Steward of the Chiltern Hundreds, causing a by-election.

By-election, 3 August 1850: Dungannon
Party	Candidate	Votes	%	±%
Conservative	Thomas Knox	Unopposed		
Conservative hold				

Knox resigned again by accepting the office of Steward of the Chiltern Hundreds, causing a by-election.

By-election, 14 February 1851: Dungannon
Party	Candidate	Votes	%	±%
Conservative	William Knox	Unopposed		
Conservative hold				

Knox was appointed a Groom in Waiting to Queen Victoria, causing a by-election.

By-election, 24 March 1852: Dungannon
Party	Candidate	Votes	%	±%
Conservative	William Knox	Unopposed		
Conservative hold				

General election 1852: Dungannon
Party	Candidate	Votes	%	±%
Conservative	William Knox	100	82.0	N/A
Whig	William Holmes	22	18.0	New
Majority		78	64.0	N/A
Turnout		122	77.2	N/A
Registered electors		158		
Conservative hold				

General election 1857: Dungannon
Party	Candidate	Votes	%	±%
Conservative	William Knox	Unopposed		
Registered electors		188		
Conservative hold				

General election 1859: Dungannon
Party	Candidate	Votes	%	±%
Conservative	William Knox	Unopposed		
Registered electors		202		
Conservative hold				

=== Elections in the 1860s ===
General election 1865: Dungannon
Party	Candidate	Votes	%	±%
Conservative	William Knox	Unopposed		
Registered electors		174		
Conservative hold				

General election 1868: Dungannon
Party	Candidate	Votes	%	±%
Conservative	William Knox	Unopposed		
Registered electors		245		
Conservative hold				

=== Elections in the 1870s ===
General election 1874: Dungannon
Party	Candidate	Votes	%	±%
Liberal	Thomas Alexander Dickson	121	52.6	New
Conservative	William Knox	109	47.4	N/A
Majority		12	5.2	N/A
Turnout		230	91.3	N/A
Registered electors		252		
Liberal gain from Conservative		Swing	N/A	

=== Elections in the 1880s ===
General election 1880: Dungannon
Party	Candidate	Votes	%	±%
Liberal	Thomas Alexander Dickson	132	50.8	−1.8
Conservative	William Knox	128	49.2	+1.8
Majority		4	1.4	−3.8
Turnout		260	92.2	+0.9
Registered electors		282		
Liberal hold		Swing		

On petition, Dickson was unseated and a by-election was called.

By-election, 25 June 1880: Dungannon
Party	Candidate	Votes	%	±%
Liberal	James Dickson	132	50.8	0.0
Conservative	William Knox	128	49.2	0.0
Majority		4	1.4	0.0
Turnout		260	92.2	0.0
Registered electors		282		
Liberal hold		Swing	0.0	
