= Lady Constance Gaskell =

Lady Constance Gaskell DCVO DStJ
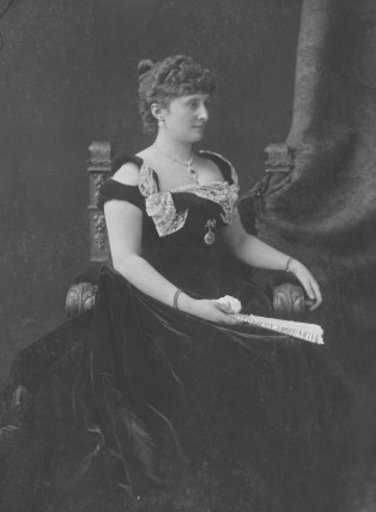
- Photograph of Lady Constance, 1899
- Born: Constance Harriet Stuart Milnes Knox; 21 April 1885
- Died: 29 April 1964 (aged 79)
- Spouse: Evelyn Milnes Gaskell (after 1905)
- Parent(s): Constance Caulfeild; Uchter Knox, 5th Earl of Ranfurly

Lady Constance Harriet Stuart Milnes Gaskell, DCVO DStJ (née Knox; 21 April 1885 – 29 April 1964) was a Woman of the Bedchamber to Queen Mary from 1937 to 1953 and Lady-in-Waiting to Princess Marina, Duchess of Kent from 1953 to 1960.

== Early life ==
Lady Constance was the second, but eldest surviving, daughter of Constance Caulfeild and Uchter Knox, 5th Earl of Ranfurly, who was later Governor of New Zealand from 1897 to 1904.

== Courtier ==
Lady Gaskell was a Woman of the Bedchamber to Queen Mary from 1937 to 1953 and Lady-in-Waiting to Princess Marina, Duchess of Kent from 1953 to 1960. She was appointed Dame of Justice, Most Venerable Order of the Hospital of St. John of Jerusalem.

== Personal life ==
On 7 November 1905, she married Maj. Evelyn Milnes Gaskell (d. 1931), a son of Rt. Hon. Charles Milnes Gaskell, MP for Morley, and the former Lady Catherine Henrietta Wallop (a daughter of the 5th Earl of Portsmouth), an author. Together, they were the parents of:

- Charles Thomas Milnes Gaskell (d. 1943), a Lt. in the Coldstream Guards, he married Lady Ethel Patricia Hare, daughter of Richard Hare, 4th Earl of Listowel and Hon. Freda Vanden-Bempde-Johnstone (a daughter of the 2nd Baron Derwent, in 1936.
- Mary Juliana Milnes Gaskell (1906–1999), who married Lewis Motley, in 1934.

Her son died in a flying accident on 5 November 1943. Lady Constance Milnes Gaskell died in 1964, eight days after her 79th birthday.

=== Legacy ===
Two portraits of Lady Constance are part of the collection of the National Portrait Gallery.
