= Edward Forestier-Walker =

General Sir Edward Forestier-Walker KCB
- Born: Edward Walter Walker; 18 February 1812; Dublin, Ireland
- Died: 27 July 1881 (aged 69); Bushey, Hertfordshire
- Military career
- Allegiance: United Kingdom
- Branch: British Army
- Rank: General
- Commands: Commander-in-Chief, Scotland
- Conflicts: Crimean War
- Awards: Knight Commander of the Order of the Bath

General Sir Edward Walter Forestier-Walker KCB (born Walker; 18 February 1812 – 27 July 1881) was a British Army officer who became Commander-in-Chief, Scotland.

== Early life ==
Sir Edward was born in Dublin, the eldest son of Gen. Frederick Nathaniel Walker and Annabella Cane. His father was the younger brother of Gen. Sir George Townshend Walker, 1st Baronet. His mother died in Calais in 1829 and is buried in Boulogne.

== Military career ==
Forestier-Walker was commissioned in 1827. He commanded the Scots Fusilier Guards at the Battle of Balaclava in October 1854, at the Battle of Inkerman in November 1854 and at the Siege of Sebastopol in Winter 1854 during the Crimean War. He became Commander-in-Chief, Scotland in 1862.

He was also colonel of the 50th Regiment of Foot from 1871 to 1881, when they became part of the new Queen's Own (Royal West Kent Regiment), after which he was briefly Colonel of the first battalion of the latter before his death later that year.

== Personal life ==
On 20 July 1843, Forestier-Walker married Lady Jane Ogilvy-Grant, daughter of Colonel Francis Ogilvy-Grant, 6th Earl of Seafield. They had four sons:

- General Sir Frederick Forestier-Walker (1844–1910), a senior military officer who was Governor of Gibraltar
- Francis Lewis George Forestier Walker (2 January 1847 – February 1854), died in childhood
- Douglas Henry Walter Forestier Walker (May–July 1849), died in childhood
- Colonel Montagu Charles Brudenell Forestier-Walker (1853–1902), killed in a train accident while serving as Assistant Adjutant-general to the British Force in Egypt

Lady Jane died in 1861. In 1862, he married secondly to Lady Juliana Caroline Frances Knox, daughter of Thomas Knox, 2nd Earl of Ranfurly. They had a daughter, who died as an infant:

- Mary Juliana Forestier Walker (born and died 1863)

He died at the Manor House in Bushey, Hertfordshire, in 1881.

Military offices
Preceded by Duncan Cameron	Commander-in-Chief, Scotland; 1861–1867	Succeeded by Randal Rumley
