= Greathed =

Greathed is a surname. Notable people with the surname include:

- Edward Greathed (1812–1881), British Army officer
- William Wilberforce Harris Greathed (1826–1878), senior officer in the Bengal Engineers

== Other ==
- Greathed Manor, Victorian country house in Dormansland, Surrey, England
