= Edward Stevenson (disambiguation) =

Edward Stevenson (1820–1897) was an American Mormon missionary.

Edward Stevenson may also refer to:

- Edward Stevenson (costume designer) (1906–1968), American costume designer
- Edward Stevenson (footballer) (1901–1977), Australian rules footballer
- Edward Stevenson (Orange Order), Grand Master of the Orange Order since 2011
- Edward A. Stevenson (1831–1895), American politician from Idaho
- Edward A. Stevenson Sr. (1907–?), New York politician
- Edward Irenaeus Prime-Stevenson (1858–1942), American author and homosexual advocate, also used the pseudonym Xavier Mayne

== See also ==
- Edward Stephenson (disambiguation)
