= Harold Henning (Orange order) =

Northern Irish clergyman (born 1961)

- Born: 1961 (age 64–65)
- Occupation: Northern Irish unionist

Harold Henning (born 1961) is a Northern Irish unionist.

== Life and career ==
Henning was born in 1961, and was a member of the Orange lodge in Rathfriland, County Down. On December 10, 2025, he replaced Edward Stevenson as the Grand Master of the Orange Lodge of Ireland. He had previously served as the Deputy Grand Master for 11 years.
