= Edward Stephenson =

Edward Stephenson may refer to:

- Edward Stephenson (art director) (1917–2011), American art director and production designer
- Edward Stephenson (colonial administrator) (died 1768), administrator of the English East India Company
- Edward Stephenson (footballer) (active 1894–1895), English football secretary-manager
- Edward Stephenson (musician) (born 1976), classical/nuevo flamenco guitarist
- Edward Stephenson (cricketer) (1891–1969), English cricketer, British Army officer and educator

== See also ==
- Edward Stevenson (disambiguation)
