= Battle of Agra =

Battle of the Indian Rebellion of 1857

- Part of the Indian Rebellion of 1857
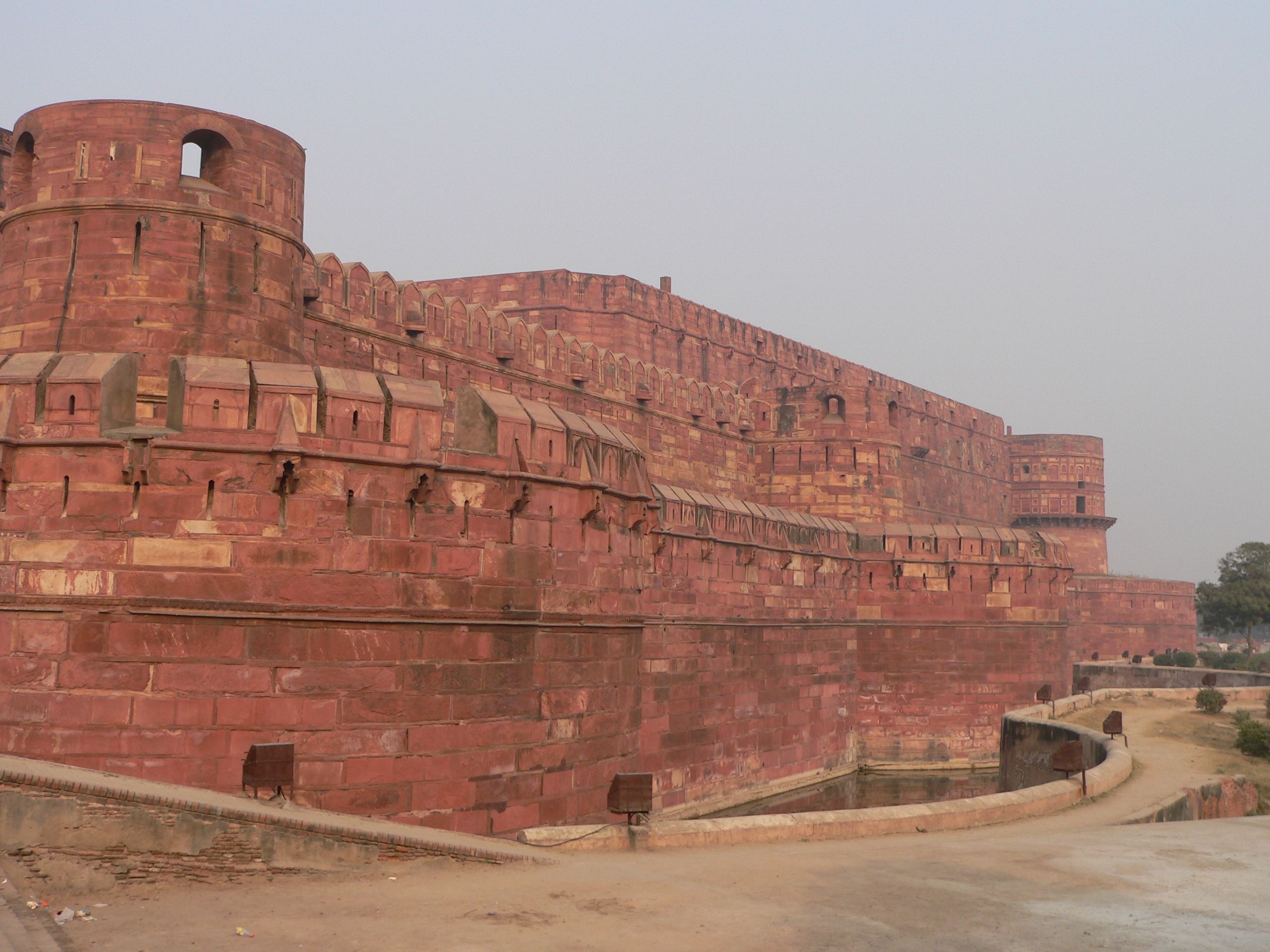
- Agra Fort ramparts
Date	10 October 1857
Location	Agra, North-Western Provinces, India 27°10′46″N 78°01′16″E
Result	British victory

Belligerents
(United Kingdom) British Empire	Rebel Company sepoys

Commanders and leaders
(United Kingdom) Edward Harris Greathed	Unknown

Strength
1,900 sepoys 750 British soldiers 12 guns	10,000; 12 guns

Casualties and losses
433 including 101 Europeans and 332 Indians	4,800

The Battle of Agra was a comparatively minor but nevertheless decisive action at the end of a prolonged siege during the Indian Rebellion of 1857.

In the early days of the rebellion, the countryside around Agra fell into widespread disorder. Many East India Company administrators and their families and servants fled to the protection of the fort. When a rebel army composed mainly of sepoys who had mutinied against their British officers approached Agra they defeated a sortie by the garrison, which was incompetently led by aged officers. However, they lacked the heavy artillery needed to assault the fort, and moved instead to join the rebels who had rallied to the nominal leadership of Emperor Bahadur Shah Zafar in Delhi.

Over the next few months, the British inside the fort endured a desultory siege. The British leaders in the fort took no decisive action against the rebels. When the Siege of Delhi ended in a British victory, they feared an attack by rebels retreating from Delhi and appealed to the commander of a nearby British column for help. The British column relieved the fort but complacently pitched camp outside. The Indian rebels attacked and achieved complete surprise, but the battle-hardened troops of the column rallied, and defeated and dispersed the rebels. This allowed the British to establish tenuous communications from east to west across the territories of Northern India previously in rebel hands, and to concentrate troops for the vital Relief of Lucknow.

== Background ==
The city and fort of Agra stand on the River Yamuna, close to the Taj Mahal. Before the rebellion broke out, Agra was the administrative centre of what was then known as the North-Western Provinces (not to be confused with the later North-West Frontier Province). The Lieutenant Governor of the province was John Russell Colvin. Stationed in the military cantonments nearby were the 3rd Bengal Fusiliers (a "European" regiment of infantry of the East India Company's army), a battery of artillery also manned by white troops, and the 44th and 67th Regiments of Bengal Native Infantry. The 3rd Bengal Fusiliers had recently been raised and had a large number of unacclimated men on the sick list. The military commander was an aged Brigadier Polwhele.

The loyalty of the sepoys (Indian soldiers) of the Bengal Army had been wavering for several years, as they feared that the actions and reforms of the East India Company were threatening Indian society and their own caste and status. After increasing unrest during the early months of 1857, the sepoys at Meerut broke into rebellion on 10 May 1857. They subsequently moved to Delhi, where they called on more sepoys to join them, and for the Emperor Bahadur Shah Zafar to lead a nationwide rebellion. The city soon fell to the rebels. On 16 May, 52 British refugees who had failed to escape from the city were executed in front of the King's palace.

News of the revolt spread quickly. The British were warned by telegraph messages sent before Delhi was captured, but Indian messengers and other travellers also rapidly spread excited versions of the events. Colvin called a meeting on 17 May. His first instinct was to withdraw the East India Company's administrators and their families into the Agra Fort but was persuaded by others including Robert Drummond, the chief magistrate, that while the sepoys' loyalty was suspect, the general population of the province was loyal to the British. Any appearance of panic by the British would provoke disturbances. In fact, the news of the rebellion caused public order in the province to break down very rapidly. There was resentment over heavy tax assessments, and other inter-communal feuds soon surfaced. Indian police guards over treasuries and prisons deserted and armed bands roamed the countryside.

== Action at Sacheta ==
Despite the officers of the two Bengal Native Infantry regiments at Agra insisting that their men were loyal, the increasingly surly demeanour of their men prompted the British to disarm them on 31 May. The disarmed sepoys were dismissed on leave to their homes. The British then heard that a large rebel force was approaching from the direction of Fatehpur. This force consisted largely of the brigades of Bengal Native troops which had been stationed at Nimach and Nasirabad and which had joined the rebellion. It numbered approximately 7000 infantry, 1500 cavalry and 8 guns. These former regulars of the Bengal Army were generally well trained and organised troops.

A contingent of troops from the state of Kotah, which was thought to support the British, was sent to block the Fatehpur road. On 4 June, the Kotah contingent defected en masse. Colvin belatedly gave permission for the 6,000 British civilians and their families and dependents (including many who had already fled the disturbances in the countryside) to move from the vulnerable civil cantonment into the fort. This move was done in such haste and even panic that most of the civilians were forced to leave their valuables and other property behind.

On 7 June, Brigadier Polwhele led his troops to face the rebel force. They took insufficient ammunition and water. The infantry were still dressed in thick scarlet uniforms, and the movement did not start until 11:00 am, in the full heat of the day at the height of summer. A village named Sacheta (or Sarsia) dominated the Fatehpur road. Polwhele's late start allowed the rebels to occupy it, and from its cover they directed a heavy fire on the British force. Although some of the 3rd Bengal Fusiliers eventually stormed the village, Polwhele had only a small number of Militia cavalry, and the rebel cavalry outflanked the British and threatened their rear. Some of the rebel cavalry captured and burned some houses in the cantonment. The British had suffered heavy casualties, including the commander of the artillery battery, and expended almost all their ammunition. They retreated in some disorder into the fort, abandoning one gun. That afternoon and evening, the British defeat prompted a general uprising within the city of Agra. The police defected and released several thousand convicts, adding to the general disorder. Every house in the cantonment was looted by mobs and set on fire. Brigadier Polwhele meanwhile retired to his dinner and to bed, unconcerned.

Within the fort, there was general panic, as the soldiers and civilians feared an imminent assault. However, the rebel force lacked the heavy guns necessary to breach the walls of the fort and instead marched off to join the rebels in Delhi.

== Siege ==
Before the refugees had crowded into the fort, Reade, the next most senior civilian after Colvin, had ensured that adequate provisions had been stockpiled inside the fort, but the sanitation and medical facilities were poor. There was much confusion and ineffectual argument. The British were able to send a dispatch to Lord Canning, the Governor General of Bengal, shortly after the debacle at Sacheta and the uprising within the city. Canning's reply was received in early August. It relieved Polwhele of his appointment. Colvin himself was increasingly incapable of managing the situation, ignoring pressing matters to deal with routine correspondence or irrelevancies. His health had been poor for some time, and he died in early September. The government of India later decided that overall authority in the province was to be wielded by Colonel Hugh Fraser of the Bengal Engineers.

Lieutenant Colonel Cotton succeeded Polwhele as military commander, and imposed some order on the chaos within the fort. He also mounted an expedition to Aligarh, some 40 miles (64 km) away on the road to Delhi and Meerut. The expedition failed to make contact with any other British forces and achieved little, but restored much of the soldiers' health and morale. However, the British were effectively confined to the fort, within which life settled into inactivity and boredom.

== Relief ==
On 21 September, the Siege of Delhi ended with the storming of the city by the British. Within days, the victorious besiegers had organised columns which secured the countryside around the city. The strongest column, which numbered 750 British and 1,900 Sikh and Punjabi soldiers, consisted of: the British 9th Lancers, detachments from the 1st, 2nd and 5th Punjab Cavalry (a squadron of each), Hodson's Horse (irregular levies), the 8th and 75th regiments of The British Army, the 2nd and 4th Punjab Infantry regiments, two troops of Bengal Horse Artillery and a field battery of Bengal Artillery, and 200 Sappers and Miners. The column's commander was Brigadier Edward Greathed (formerly the commanding officer of the 8th (King's) Regiment), who was not generally highly regarded by his junior officers. They moved out of Delhi on 24 September. Several officers were surprised that the column was able to move so promptly, given the exhausted and debauched state of many units after the siege and storming of the city, but all the column's soldiers were glad to escape Delhi, with its stench of many unburied dead bodies.

Greathed's column was directed to move to Cawnpore. Although the commanders at Delhi did not have detailed information on the situation in Oudh, it was known that Lucknow was besieged and Cawnpore was threatened. The column moved along the Grand Trunk Road, fighting a sharp action against rebels at Bulandshahr and taking indiscriminate punitive measures against several Indian villages.

The defenders of Agra meanwhile were overjoyed at hearing the news that Delhi had been stormed, but were suddenly panicked by rumours that rebels fleeing Delhi had arrived at Muttrah nearby. Many civilians had celebrated the recapture of Delhi by going sightseeing at the Taj Mahal, and suddenly fled back to Agra in disorder. They feared that the rebels at Muttrah would combine with other rebels from Central India and the Gwalior Contingent (a division of troops modelled on the Bengal Army but in the service of Maharajah Jayajirao Scindia of Gwalior, which had joined the rebellion soon after its outbreak) and storm Agra. They sent a succession of urgent requests to Greathed

== Battle ==
Finally swayed by these pleas, Greathed left a small detachment at Aligarh to maintain control of the district, and marched his troops and his large baggage train of elephants, camels and bullock carts 44 miles (71 km) to Agra in twenty-eight hours. He arrived on the morning of 10 August and crossed the Yamuna by a bridge of boats. His force received a cool reception from the garrison. His battle-weary British troops in worn khaki dress were mistaken at first for Afghan tribesmen by some of the civilian women. By contrast many of the civilians were fashionably and smartly dressed, and the soldiers of the garrison were still splendid in scarlet uniforms with pipeclayed white belts.

Having recovered from their earlier state of panic, the senior officers of the garrison now assured Greathed that on news of his approach, the rebels had retreated across the Khara Naddi, a stream 9 miles (14 km) distant. A sentry who the night before had alerted his officers to the sound of large bodies of men marching was ignored. Greathed's tired brigade therefore marched to a parade ground about 1.5 miles (2.4 km) from the fort, and began to pitch camp. They did not post pickets or sentries, even though there were fields of bajra, a tall millet-like crop which hid any approaching enemy from view, in front of the parade ground. The column's baggage animals with tents and supplies were still arriving, and many of the occupants of the fort and inhabitants of the city went to view Greathed's troops. Greathed himself and his staff went to take breakfast in the fort.

A group of jugglers approached some of the 9th Lancers and Punjab Cavalry before suddenly revealing themselves to be Muslim fanatics, drawing swords and slashing at the cavalrymen. At the same time, two troops of rebel cavalry rode out of the bajra and engaged some of the column hand to hand, while shot from several heavy guns raked the British bivouac area. There was mass panic among the drivers of the baggage animals and the civilian spectators. Despite the shock of the surprise attack, the veteran British and Punjabi troops rallied and fell in to their ranks, in various states of undress. They disposed of the attacking cavalry and the artillery returned the rebels' cannon fire. The troops inside the fort marched down to the parade ground, still in their smart uniforms and with their bands playing. When they arrived, the rebels were already in flight. The rebels were probably surprised by the presence of Greathed's column and had supposed that they faced only the garrison of the fort. They had given orders for the bridge over the Yamuna to be destroyed to prevent the relief column arriving, but this had not been done.

Greathed ordered a general advance. Lieutenant Colonel Cotton, of the garrison, was supposedly senior to Greathed and after some delay while he was briefed on the situation, the advance began, the entire force in line with skirmishers in front. After 4 miles (6.4 km), they reached the rebels' abandoned camp, where the infantry halted. The cavalry maintained the pursuit, eventually reaching the Khara Naddi. They captured thirteen guns which the rebels had abandoned.

== Casualties ==
Although Greathed's cavalry cut down few of the fleeing rebels, other eyewitness accounts maintained that the ground in front of the British camp was thickly strewn with dead bodies. The British themselves lost 12 killed, 54 wounded and 2 missing, plus 20 camp followers killed and wounded.

== Results ==
This small but fierce action broke organised opposition to the British between Delhi and Cawnpore. After the victory, the commanders of the garrison reverted to their previous state of panic, and wanted Greathed to remain in the area to protect Agra against rebels from Gwalior. Greathed however insisted on carrying out his original orders, which were to clear the area between the Ganges and Yamuna rivers. He was also persuaded by a note received while at Bulandshahr from General Henry Havelock, who said that he was on his way to relieve Lucknow and urgently needed reinforcements and transport. Greathed's force eventually formed a substantial part of the army which carried out the Second Relief of Lucknow.

== Sources ==
- Edwardes, Michael (1963). Battles of the Indian Mutiny. Pan Books. ISBN 0-330-02524-4.
- Hibbert, Christopher (1978). The Great Mutiny. Penguin Books. ISBN 0-14-004752-2.
