= Edward Greathed =

British Army general

General Sir Edward Greathed KCB
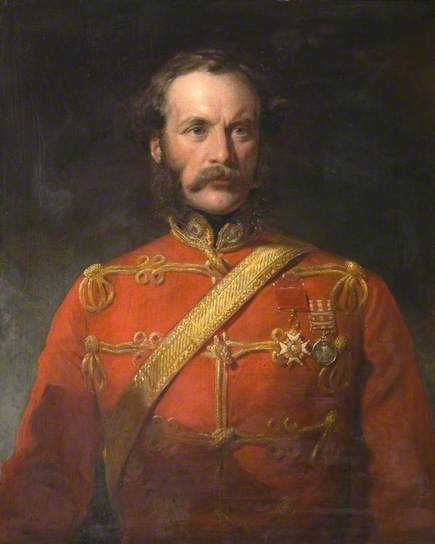
- Born: 8 June 1812; London
- Died: 19 November 1881 (aged 69)
- Military career
- Allegiance: United Kingdom
- Branch: British Army
- Rank: General
- Commands: 8th (The King's) Regiment of Foot; Eastern District
- Conflicts: Indian Rebellion: Battle of Agra; Siege of Delhi; Relief of Lucknow; Second Battle of Cawnpore
- Awards: Knight Commander of the Order of the Bath Indian Mutiny Medal

General Sir Edward Harris Greathed KCB (8 June 1812 – 19 November 1881) was a British Army officer who became General Officer Commanding Eastern District.

== Military career ==
He was born in London, one of the five sons of Edward Harris and Mary Elizabeth Glyn of Uddens, Dorset and baptised in Chalbury, Dorset. One of his brothers became Major-General William Wilberforce Harris Greathed. He was educated at Westminster School before being commissioned as an ensign in the 8th (The King's) Regiment of Foot on 22 June 1832.

He rose through the ranks to become commanding officer of the 8th (The King's) Regiment of Foot and, in that capacity, commanded the a column which defeated and dispersed some 5,000 rebels at the Battle of Agra in August 1857 during the Indian Rebellion.

He then participated in the capture of Ludlow Castle in the vicinity of Kashmiri Gate in the northern walls of Delhi. Grouped into the 2nd Column with the 2nd Bengal Fusiliers and 4th Sikhs, the 8th (The King's) Regiment of Foot attacked Delhi early on 14 September 1857 with the intent of capturing the Water Bastion and Kashmiri Gate. After this attack he led the 3rd Infantry Brigade at the Relief of Lucknow in November 1857 and at the Second Battle of Cawnpore in December 1857 as well as the subsequent capture of Tatya Tope. He was made CB in 1858 and elevated to KCB on 28 March 1865.

After his return to England, he went on to be General Officer Commanding Eastern District in April 1872. He was given the colonelcy of the 108th Regiment of Foot (Madras Infantry) in 1880 continuing, after its amalgamation later that year into the Inniskilling Fusiliers, as colonel of the 2nd Battalion of the new regiment until his death. He was promoted full general on 1 July 1880 and was placed on the retired list on 1 July 1881.

He died at his home, Uddens House in Chalbury, Dorset on 19 November 1881 and was buried in nearby All Saints churchyard, Hampreston.

== Family ==
Greathed married three times; firstly in India on 8 March 1854 to Louisa Archer (née Hartwell); secondly on 18 December 1868 to Ellen Mary Tuffnell; and thirdly on 4 August 1869 to Charlotte Frederica Caroline Osborn, eldest daughter of Sir George Robert Osborn, 6th Baronet. He had at least two sons and a daughter by his early marriages, and one son and three daughters by his last marriage:

- Helena Mary Greathed, born 26 April 1862, who married in 1884 Major Keppel Stephenson (1847–1912), son of the politician Henry Frederick Stephenson (1790–1858) by his wife Lady Mary Keppel (1804–1898), daughter of 4th Earl of Albermarle. They had children, including Edward Stephenson.
- Edward Wilberforce Osborn Greathed, born 7 July 1870; died unmarried 2 December 1893
- Charlotte Elizabeth Greathed, born 3 May 1872, married 6 November 1902 Charles Bayley Oldfield
- Georgiana Laura Greathed, born 11 July 1874; died unmarried 11 April 1954
- Dorothy Louisa Greathed, born 16 February 1876; married 6 November 1902 Eric Hanbury-Tracy, son of Frederick Hanbury-Tracy of the Baron Sudeley.

Military offices
Preceded by Alexander Hamilton-Gordon	GOC Eastern District; 1872–1877	Succeeded by Sir Richard Kelly
Preceded by New Regiment	Colonel of the 2nd Battalion, Royal Inniskilling Fusiliers; 1881	Succeeded by Hon. Sir Arthur Edward Hardinge
Preceded by John Hamilton Elphinstone Dalyrmple	Colonel of the 108th Regiment of Foot (Madras Infantry); 1880–1881	Regiment amalgamated into the Royal Inniskilling Fusiliers
