= Caroline Clive =

British writer

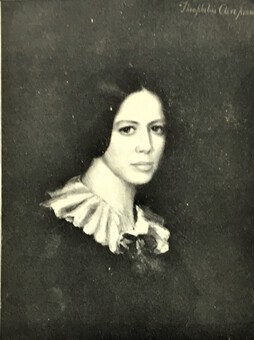
- Born: Caroline Meysey-Wigley; 24 June 1801; Brompton Grove, London, England, UK
- Died: 13 July 1873 (aged 72); Whitfield, Herefordshire, England, UK
- Occupation: writer
- Spouse: Archer Clive (m. 1840)
- Children: 2
- Writing career
- Pen name: V
- Language: English
- Genres: poems, novels
- Notable works: IX Poems, Paul Ferroll

Caroline Wigley Clive (née Meysey-Wigley; 24 June 1801 – 13 July 1873) was an English writer known by the pseudonym V. She was known chiefly as the author of IX Poems that when first published, took their place in the forefront of then-contemporary feminine verse. Clive wrote all her life, was a brilliant conversationalist, was held in the highest regard within an exceptionally notable intellectual circle, and carried on a large correspondence.

== Early years ==
Caroline Meysey-Wigley was born in Brompton Grove, London, 24 June 1801. She was the daughter and co-heiress of Edmund Meysey-Wigley, Esq., of Shakenhurst, Worcestershire, M.P. for Worcester, and his wife, Anna Maria Meysey, only surviving daughter of Charles Watkins Meysey. At the age of three, she had a severe illness, one issue of which was life-long lameness and consequent hindrance in many ways.

== Career ==
In 1840, her IX Poems appeared in a small duodecimo, which Hartley Coleridge reviewed in the Quarterly Review (September 1840) saying:—

"We suppose V stands for Victoria, and really she queens it among our fair friends. Perhaps V will think it a questionable compliment, if we say, like the late Baron Graham to Lady ---, in the Assize Court at Exeter, 'We beg your ladyship's pardon, but we took you for a man.' Indeed, these few pages are distinguished by a sad Lucretian tone, such as very seldom comes from a woman's lyre. But V is a woman, and no ordinary woman certainly; though, whether spinster, wife, or widow, we have not been informed." More weighty—"Of 'IX Poems' by V we emphatically say, in old Greek, Etui ptv d\Xa POAA. It is an Ennead to which every Muse may have contributed her Ninth. The stanzas printed by us in italics, are, in our judgment, worthy of any one of our greatest poets in his happiest moments." The stanzas designated are 4, 9, II, 14 of "The Grave "—one of our selected examples. Later came Dr. John Brown, in his Hone Subsecivce, echoing Hartley Coleridge's Greek of the roses, and adding: "They contain rare excellency; the concentration, the finish, the gravity ol a man's thought, with the tenderness, the insight, the constitutional sorrowfulness of a woman's—her purity, her passionateness, her delicate and keen sense and experience."

On 10 November 1840, she married the Reverend Archer Clive, son of Edward Bolton Clive, then rector of Solihull, Warwickshire, and son of Edmund Bolton Clive, Esq., M.P. for Hereford, and Harriet Archer. By him she had one son and one daughter: Charles Meysey Bolton Clive (30 January 1842 – 11 August 1883) who married Lady Katherine Elizabeth Mary Julia Fielding, and who succeeded to the Whitfield estate on the death of his father; and Alice Clive (22 December 1843 – 27 December 1915) who married Major General William Wilberforce Harris Greathed.

A second edition of IX Poems was published in 1841, with nine other poems. There followed at intervals, I watched the Heavens (1842); The Queen's Ball (1847); Valley of the Rea (1851); and The Morlas (1853). The whole of these were included, with short additions, in the volume of 1890 but a considerable number were left unpublished. Paul Ferroll (1853), a sensational novel, and others, kept her before the public, still as V.

Clive's reputation chiefly rested upon her story of Paul Ferroll and its sequel, Why Paul Ferroll Killed his Wife. The second story was, however, in no way equal to the first; and a subsequent novel, John Greswold, which appeared in 1864, was decidedly inferior to its predecessors, although containing passages of considerable literary merit. Paul Ferroll passed through several editions, and was translated into French. It was not until the fourth edition that the concluding chapter, which brought the story down to the death of Paul Ferroll, was added. Paul Ferroll may be considered as the precursor of the purely sensational novel, or of what may be called the novel mystery. Clive was placed in the forefront of the sensational novelists of the 19th-century. She anticipated the work of Wilkie Collins, Charles Reade, Miss Braddon, and many others of their school, in showing human nature as expressed by its energies, neither diagnosing it like a physician, nor analysing it like a priest.

Neither the longer poems nor the lesser additions, approached the high level of the inspired IX, albeit there were "brave translunary things" in all. In after-editions, Clive capriciously withdrew the last of the nine poems and went on adding. Even the slightest additions showed inestimable technique if in common with her longer poems of "The Queen's Ball", "Valley of the Rea", and "The Morlas", though they were characterized as being 'somewhat thin of substance'. Nonetheless, none failed to yield 'immortal phrases five words long', and certain ones recalled Shakespeare's metaphor of the dolphin showing its shining back above the element it moves in. Her works were all published anonymously, using the pen name, "V".

Clive was a confirmed invalid for some years prior to her death. She died in a fire accident while seated in her boudoir and among her papers on 13 July 1873, at Whitfield, Herefordshire.

== Selected works ==
- IX Poems. By V. Lon., 1840, p. 8vo; 2d ed., 1841. (This volume attracted much notice, and was very favourably reviewed in the Quarterly. The second edition includes nine additional poems).
- I Watched the Heavens: a Poem. By V. Lon., 1842, p. 8vo. (The first canto of an unfinished poem.)
- The Queen's Ball: a Poem By V. Lon., 1847, p. 8vo.
- The Valley of the Rea: a Poem By V. Lon., 1851, p. 8vo.
- The Morlas: a Poem. By V. Lon., 1853, p. 8vo.
- Paul Ferroll: a Tale. By the Author of "IX Poems," by V. Lon., 1855, p. 8vo. (The fourth edition contains a concluding chapter, bringing the story down to the death of Paul Ferroll.)
- Poems. By the Author of"Paul Ferroll." Including a New Edition of "IX Poems," by V.: with Former and Recent Editions. Lon., 1856, 8vo. (Some of the earlier poems are omitted in this edition).
- Year after Year. By the Author of "Paul Ferroll" and "IX Poems." Lon., 1858,12mo.
- Why Paul Ferroll Killed his Wife, Lon., 1860,12mo.; new ed., 1864. (The preface contains a defence of "Paul Ferroll" against some strictures in the Edinburgh Review).
- John Greswold. By the Author of "Paul Ferroll." Lon., 1864, 2 vols. p. 8vo.
- Poems. By V., Author of "Paul Ferroll." Including the "IX Poems." Lon., 1872, 8vo. (This contains twelve new poems, but is not a complete edition).

=== Contributions to periodicals ===
Poems

- The Nursling. By V., author of "IX. Poems" and "Paul Ferroll." — 1857 Jan 24, in The National Magazine Vol.1, p. 197
- The Chained Eagle. By V., author of "IX. Poems" and "Paul Ferroll." — 1857 Jun 6, in The National Magazine Vol.2, p. 149
- The First Morning of 1860. Signed V. — 1860 Jan, in The Cornhill Magazine Vol.1, pp. 122–123
- Beaten to Death. By V. — 1860 Jun, in The Constitutional Press Vol.3
- Christmas 1860. — 1860 Dec 29, in Hereford Times
- Seasons. By V., author of "IX. Poems," "Paul Ferroll," etc. — 1861, in THE VICTORIA REGIA, pp. 111–114
- The Irish All Souls' Night. By the author of "Paul Ferroll." Signed V. — 1861 Apr, in The St. James's Magazine Vol.1, pp. 40–42
- November. — 1865, in THE GOLDEN CALENDAR: WITH A PERPETUAL ALMANAC

Tales

- Rough Material. By the author of "IX Poems by V." Signed V. — 1841 Feb, in The Metropolitan Magazine Vol.30, pp. 159–164
- The Great Drought. Signed V. — 1844 Oct, in Blackwood's Edinburgh Magazine Vol.56, pp. 433–453
- John Pike Yapp. A Tale of Mayo. By the author of "Paul Ferroll." — 1857 Mar 14, 21, in The National Magazine Vol.1, pp. 307–310, 323-329
- The Tower of Hawkstone Castle. By the author of "Paul Ferroll." — 1857 Aug 22, 29, in The National Magazine Vol.2, pp. 328–332, 339-344
- A Christmas Vagary. By V., author of "IX. Poems" and "Paul Ferroll." — 1858 Jan 23, 30, in The National Magazine Vol.3, pp. 200–205, 212-215
- Genuine Transactions with Principy Jack. Signed V. — 1858 Dec, in The National Magazine Vol.5, pp. 63–67
- War—A Tale. By the author of "Paul Ferroll" and "IX Poems by V." — 1860 Feb, Mar, in The Constitutional Press Vol.2, pp. 369–381, 449-459
- "Nadrione Spetnione:" Wishes Fulfilled. A Tale. By the author of "Paul Ferroll," &c. — 1861 Apr, May, in The St. James's Magazine Vol.1, pp. 275–284, 443-460 — 1861 Aug, Sep, in The St. James's Magazine Vol.2, pp. 97–109, 177-190
- From an Old Gentleman's Diary. By the author of "Paul Ferroll." — 1865 Aug, in Fraser's Magazine Vol.72, pp. 256–260
- The Wishes Shop. By the author of "Paul Ferroll." — 1865 Nov, in Fraser's Magazine Vol.72, pp. 637–643, *Index
- Ebb and Flow. Signed V. — 1867 Nov, in The Churchman's Companion Ser.2 Vol.2, pp. 385–399

Play

- A Minute Ago. By the author of "Paul Ferroll." — 1860 May, Jun, in The Constitutional Press Vol.3

Articles

- Vanity and Self-Esteem. Signed V. — 1847 Jun, in The New Monthly Belle Assemblee Vol.26, pp. 369–371
- The Swimming School for Women at Paris. Signed V. — 1859 Nov 12, in Once a Week Vol.1, pp. 403–404
