= Orange Order =

Protestant fraternal order based in Northern Ireland

Loyal Orange Institution
- Founded: 21 September 1795; 231 years ago Loughgall, County Armagh, Ireland
- Type: Fraternal order
- Affiliation: Independent
- Status: Active
- Emphasis: Protestant
- Scope: International
- Colors: Orange and Purple
- Flag
- Chapters: 1,400 lodges
- Nickname: Orange Order
- Headquarters: Belfast, Northern Ireland; United Kingdom

The Loyal Orange Institution, commonly known as the Orange Order, is an international Protestant fraternal order based in Northern Ireland and primarily associated with Ulster Protestants. Due to the spread and outreach of Orangeism, there are lodges around the world, including in England, Scotland, Wales, the Republic of Ireland, the United States, and parts of the Commonwealth of Nations, including West Africa, New Zealand and Australia. Historically, Orange lodges have existed in mainland Europe, Central America, South America, the Caribbean and Asia.

The Orange Order was founded by Ulster Protestants in County Armagh in 1795, during a period of Protestant–Catholic sectarian conflict, as a fraternity sworn to maintain the Protestant Ascendancy in Ireland. The all-island Grand Orange Lodge of Ireland was established in 1798. Its name is a tribute to the Dutch-born Protestant king William of Orange, who defeated the Catholic English king James II in the Williamite War in Ireland (1689–1691). The Order is best known for its yearly marches, the biggest of which are held on or around 12 July (The Twelfth), a public holiday in Northern Ireland.

The Orange Order is a conservative, British unionist and Ulster loyalist organisation. Thus it has opposed Irish nationalism and republicanism and campaigned against Scottish independence. The Order sees itself as defending Protestant civil and religious liberties, whilst critics accuse it of being sectarian, triumphalist, supremacist and anti-Catholic. It does not accept non-Protestants as members unless they convert and adhere to its principles, nor does it accept Protestants married to non-Protestants. Orange marches through Catholic neighbourhoods are controversial and have on occasion led to violence, such as the Drumcree conflict.

== History ==
The Orange Order celebrates the civil and religious privileges conferred on Protestants by William of Orange, the Stadtholder of the Dutch Republic who became King of England, Scotland, Ireland and Wales in the Glorious Revolution of 1688. The Order regularly commemorates the victories of William III and his forces during the Williamite War in Ireland in the early 1690s, especially the Battle of the Boyne.

=== Formation and early years ===
Since the 1690s, commemorations had been held throughout Ireland celebrating key dates in the Williamite War such as the Battle of Aughrim, Battle of the Boyne, Siege of Derry and the second Siege of Limerick. These followed a tradition started in Elizabethan England of celebrating key events in the Protestant calendar. By the 1740s, there were organisations holding parades in Dublin such as the Boyne Club and the Protestant Society, both seen as forerunners to the Orange Order.

==== Armagh disturbances ====
Throughout the 1780s, sectarian tension had been building in County Armagh, largely due to the relaxation of the Penal Laws. Here the number of Protestants and Catholics (in what was then Ireland's most populous county) were roughly equal, and competition between them to rent patches of land near markets was fierce. Drunken brawls between rival gangs had by 1786 become openly sectarian. These gangs eventually reorganised as the Protestant Peep o' Day Boys and the Catholic Defenders, with the next decade in County Armagh marked by fierce sectarian conflict between the groups, which escalated and spread into neighbouring counties.

==== Battle of the Diamond ====
In September 1795, at a crossroads known as "The Diamond" near Loughgall, Defenders and Protestant Peep o' Day Boys gathered to fight each other. This initial standoff ended without a battle when the priest who accompanied the Defenders persuaded them to seek a truce, after a group called the "Bleary Boys" came from County Down to reinforce the Peep o' Day Boys. But when a contingent of Defenders from County Tyrone arrived on 21 September, they were "determined to fight". The Peep o' Day Boys quickly regrouped and opened fire on the Defenders. According to William Blacker, the battle was short. The Defenders suffered "not less than thirty" deaths.

After the battle had ended, the Peep o' Days marched into Loughgall, and in the house of James Sloan they founded the Orange Order, which was to be a Protestant defence association made up of lodges. The lodges' principal pledge was to defend "the King and his heirs so long as he or they support the Protestant Ascendancy". At the start the Orange Order was a "parallel organisation" to the Defenders in that it was a secret oath-bound society that used passwords and signs.

Blacker, one of the very few landed gentry who joined the Orange Order at the outset, was unhappy with some of the outcomes of the Battle of the Diamond. He says that a determination was expressed to drive "from this quarter of the county the entire of its Roman Catholic population", with notices posted warning them "to Hell or Connaught". People were warned by notices not to inform on local Orangemen or "I will Blow your Soul to the Low hils of Hell And Burn the House you are in". Within two months, 7,000 Catholics had been driven out of County Armagh. According to Lord Gosford, the governor of Armagh:

It is no secret that a persecution is now raging in this country ... the only crime is ... profession of the Roman Catholic faith. Lawless banditti have constituted themselves judges ... and the sentence they have denounced ... is nothing less than a confiscation of all property, and an immediate banishment.

A former Grand Master of the Order, also called William Blacker, and Robert Hugh Wallace, a former County Grand Master of Belfast, have questioned this, saying whoever the Governor believed were the "lawless banditti" could not have been Orangemen as no lodges existed at the time of his speech. According to historian Jim Smyth:

Later apologists rather implausibly deny any connection between the Peep-o'-Day Boys and the first Orangemen or, even less plausibly, between the Orangemen and the mass wrecking of Catholic cottages in Armagh in the months following 'the Diamond' – all of them, however, acknowledge the movement's lower-class origins.

The Order's three main founders were James Wilson (founder of the Orange Boys), Daniel Winter and James Sloan. The first Orange lodge was established in nearby Dyan, and its first grandmaster was James Sloan of Loughgall. Its first marches were to celebrate the Battle of the Boyne and took place on 12 July 1796 in Portadown, Lurgan and Waringstown.

==== United Irishmen rebellion ====
The Society of United Irishmen was formed by liberal Presbyterians and Anglicans in Belfast in 1791. It sought reform of the Parliament of Ireland, Catholic Emancipation and the repeal of the Penal Laws. By the time the Orange Order was formed, the United Irishmen had become a revolutionary group advocating an independent Irish republic that would "Unite Catholic, Protestant and Dissenter". United Irishmen activity was on the rise, and the government hoped to thwart it by backing the Orange Order from 1796 onward.

Irish nationalist historians Thomas A. Jackson and John Mitchel argued that the government's goal was to hinder the United Irishmen by fomenting sectarianism, thereby creating disunity and disorder under pretence of "passion for the Protestant religion". Mitchel wrote that the government invented and spread "fearful rumours of intended massacres of all the Protestant people by the Catholics". Historian Richard R Madden wrote that "efforts were made to infuse into the mind of the Protestant feelings of distrust to his Catholic fellow-countrymen". MP Thomas Knox wrote in August 1796 that "As for the Orangemen, we have rather a difficult card to play ... we must to a certain degree uphold them, for with all their licentiousness, on them we must rely for the preservation of our lives and properties should critical times occur".

The United Irishmen saw the Defenders as potential allies, and between 1794 and 1796 they formed a coalition. Despite some seeing the Defenders as "ignorant and poverty-stricken houghers and rick-burners", the United Irishmen were indebted to the Armagh disturbances as the Orangemen had scattered politicised Catholics throughout the country and encouraged Defender recruitment, creating a proto-army for the United Irishmen to utilise.

The United Irishmen launched a rebellion in 1798. In Ulster, most of the United Irish commanders and many of the rebels were Protestant. Orangemen were recruited into the yeomanry to help fight the rebellion and "proved an invaluable addition to government forces". No attempt was made to disarm Orangemen outside the yeomanry because they were seen as by far the lesser threat. It was also claimed that if an attempt had been made then "the whole of Ulster would be as bad as Antrim and Down", where the United Irishmen rebellion was at its strongest. However, massacres by the rebels in County Wexford "did much to dampen" the rebellion in Ulster. The Scullabogue Barn massacre saw over 100 non-combatant (mostly Protestant) men, women, and children imprisoned in a barn which was then set alight, with the Catholic and Protestant rebels ensuring none escaped, not even a child who it is claimed managed to break out only for a rebel to kill with his pike. In the trials that followed the massacres, evidence was recorded of anti-Orange sentiments being expressed by the rebels at Scullabogue. Partly as a result of this atrocity, the Orange Order quickly grew and large numbers of gentry with experience gained in the yeomanry came into the movement.

The homeland and birthplace of the Defenders was mid-Ulster and here they failed to participate in the rebellion, having been cowed into submission and surrounded by their Protestant neighbours who had been armed by the government. The sectarian attacks on them were so severe that Grand Masters of the Orange Order convened to find ways of reducing them. According to Ruth Dudley Edwards and two former Grand Masters, Orangemen were among the first to contribute to repair funds for Catholic property damaged in the rebellion.

One major outcome of the United Irishmen rebellion was the 1800 Act of Union that merged the Irish Parliament with that of Westminster, creating the United Kingdom of Great Britain and Ireland. Many Catholics supported the Act, but the Orange Order saw it as a threat to the "Protestant constitution" and 36 lodges in counties Armagh and Monaghan alone passed declarations opposing the Union.

The Grand Orange Lodge of England was established in 1808, many of whom were soldiers who had been stationed in Ireland during the Irish Rebellion. The previous year saw the formation of the County Grand Lodge of Manchester.

=== Suppression ===
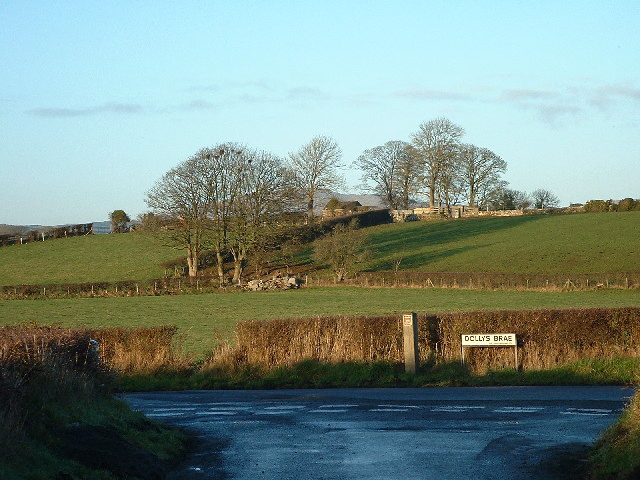
Dolly's Brae, site of the "Battle of Dolly's Brae" (1849) between Orangemen and Catholic Ribbonmen

In the early 19th century, Orangemen were heavily involved in violent conflict with an Irish Catholic secret society called the Ribbonmen. One instance, publicised in a 7 October 1816 edition of the Boston Commercial Gazette, included the murder of a Catholic priest and several members of the congregation of Dumreilly parish in County Cavan on 25 May 1816. According to the article, "A number of Orangemen with arms rushed into the church and fired upon the congregation".

On 19 July 1823, the Unlawful Oaths Bill was passed, banning all oath-bound societies in Ireland. This included the Orange Order, which had to be dissolved and reconstituted. In 1825 a bill banning unlawful associations – largely directed at Daniel O'Connell and his Catholic Association, compelled the Orangemen once more to dissolve their association. When Westminster finally granted Catholic Emancipation in 1829, Roman Catholics were free to take seats as MPs (and take up various other positions of influence and power from which they had been excluded) and play a part in framing the laws of the land. The likelihood of Irish Catholic members holding the balance of power in the Westminster Parliament further increased the alarm of Orangemen in Ireland, as O'Connell's 'Repeal' movement aimed to bring about the restoration of a separate Irish Parliament in Dublin, which would have a Catholic majority, thereby ending the Protestant Ascendancy. From this moment on, the Orange Order re-emerged in a new and even more militant form. In 1835, Parliament conducted an enquiry into Orangeism and declared the oaths of the Orange Order to be illegal and prohibited their demonstrations and parades.

In 1836, the Order was accused of plotting to place Ernest Augustus, Duke of Cumberland and Imperial Grand Master of the Orange Order, on the throne in place of Victoria when King William IV died; once the plot was revealed the House of Commons called upon the King to disband the Order. Under pressure from Joseph Hume, William Molesworth and Lord John Russell, the King indicated measures would have to be taken and the Duke of Cumberland was forced to dissolve the Orange lodges.

Hume laid evidence before the House of Commons of an approach in July 1832 to Lord Londonderry. A letter from Lieutenant-Colonel W. B. Fairman, Deputy Grand Secretary of the Orange Institution of Great Britain, advised the Marquess that following "a death of importance" (the passing of the King), the Orangemen would abandon their policy of "non-resistance" to the present "Popish Cabinet, and democratical Ministry" (the parliamentary reform ministry of Earl Grey) and that "it might be political to join" them. Londonderry demurred: he had no doubt that the Duke of Cumberland would be persuaded that "the present state of liberal Whig feeling in this very Whig county ... entirely preclude the possibility of successful efforts at this juncture".

In 1845, the ban was again lifted, but the notorious Battle of Dolly's Brae between Orangemen and Ribbonmen in 1849 led to a ban on Orange marches which remained in place for several decades. This was eventually lifted after a campaign of disobedience led by William Johnston of Ballykilbeg, Sovereign Grand Master of the Royal Black Institution, a senior Orange fraternity. Since the Fenian-organised funeral in Dublin for Terence McManus in 1861, Johnston had been asking: "If Nationalists are allowed such mobilisation, why are loyal Orangemen not allowed to march freely". On the Orange Twelfth 1867, he forced the issue by leading a large procession of Orangemen from Bangor to Newtownards in County Down. The contravention of the Party Procession Act earned him a two-month prison sentence. The following year, as the standard bearer of United Protestant Working Men's Association of Ulster, Johnston was returned to Parliament for Belfast.

=== Revival ===
By the late 19th century, the Order was in decline. However, its fortunes were revived in the 1880s after its embrace by the landlords in opposition to both the Irish Land League, presided over by nationalist leader Charles Stuart Parnell, and Home Rule. In response to Gladstone's first Irish Home Rule Bill 1886, Colonel Edward Saunderson, a landowner who had represented County Cavan as a Liberal and who had ridiculed the order's "big drums", donned an Orange sash. Saunderson, who went on to lead the Irish Unionist Alliance at Westminster, had concluded that "the Orange society is alone capable of dealing with the condition of anarchy and rebellion which prevail in Ireland".

After Gladstone's first Home Rule Bill was defeated in the House of Commons on 8 June 1886, Irish Home-Rule MPs in the House accused the Order's Belfast Grand Master, the Church of Ireland rector Richard Rutledge Kane of fomenting the violent rioting in Belfast that took 32 lives. RIC constables had been brought in from other parts of Ireland, many of them Catholic, when revellers, celebrating the defeat, had begun attacking Catholic homes and businesses. Kane did not counter the rumour that they were on a punitive mission for the Liberal government, declaring that, unless they were disarmed, 200,000 armed Orangemen would relieve them of their weapons.

At the same time, in 1895, Kane was a patron of the branch in Belfast of the Gaelic League, which in the decade to follow was to become indissolubly linked with Irish nationalism.As a patron of the League's promotion of the Irish language, he was in company of Henry Henry, the Catholic Bishop of Down and Connor, but also Thomas Welland, the Church of Ireland Bishop of Down, Connor and Dromore, and George Raphael Buick, Moderator of the Presbyterian Church and branch vice president. The Branch president was Kane's parishioner, John St. Clair Boyd. There was a time, historian Brian Kennaway remarks, when Orangemen, still regarding themselves as Irish patriots, "had no problem with the Irish language". (Kane's memorial at the Clifton Street Orange Hall over whose opening he had presided in 1885, commends him as a "Loyal Irish Patriot").

=== Tenant right, labour and the Independent Orange Order ===
Famously, when in 1880, as part of its campaign for the Three Fs (fair rent, fixity of tenure, and free sale) and of resistance to evictions, the Land League organised the withdrawal of labour from Captain Charles Boycott, a land agent in County Mayo, Orangemen from County Cavan and County Monaghan, under military and police protection, helped bring in the harvest on his employer's estate. But among Orangemen there was tenant-farmer support for reform. One reason the majority Irish Conservatives at Westminster did not oppose Gladstone's 1881 Land Act conceding the three F's was their recognition that "the land grievance had been a bond of discontent between Ulster and the rest of Ireland and in that sense a danger to the union". Quite apart from participation in local tenant-right associations, they had reports of Orangemen in the west (in counties Armagh, Cavan, Fermanagh and Tyrone) actually joining the national League.

Tension between tenants and landowners, nonetheless, continued within the Order, the focus shifting from tenant right to "compulsory purchase" (the right of tenants to buy out their landlords at fixed valuations). Particularly in north Antrim, where their organisation was strong, from 1903 tenant farmers began to defect to a new Independent Orange Order (IOO). Within the year, the Independents had nine lodges in Ballymoney alone.

The split had first occurred in Belfast. In laying the foundation stone of the Working Men's Institute in Belfast in 1870, William Johnston had welcomed Catholics and Protestants uniting "around the flag of 'The United Working Classes of Belfast' determined to show that there are times and circumstances when religious differences and party creeds must be forgotten". Others within the Order regarded such unity as tantamount to religious and national ecumenism. Such differences came to a head in 1902, in the contest to succeed Johnston as MP for Belfast South (and at time when four fifths of lodge masters in the city were workingmen).

Thomas Sloan established the Independent lodges after he had been expelled by the Order for running as the nominee of the Belfast Protestant Association against the official unionist candidate, one of the city's largest millowners. For at least some of his supporters, the split was a protest against what they saw as the co-optation of the Orange Order by unionist political leaders and their alignment with the interests of landlords and employers (the "fur coat brigade"). With other independents, in the great Belfast Lockout of 1907 Sloan was to speak on platforms with the Irish Transport and General Workers' Union leader, James Larkin.

The Grand Master of the Independents, R. Lindsay Crawford outlined the new order's democratic manifesto in Orangeism, its history and progress: a plea for first principles (1904). However, his subsequent call in the Magheramorne Manifesto (1904) on Irish Protestants to "reconsider their position as Irish citizens and their attitude towards their Roman Catholic countrymen" proved too much for Sloan and most of the membership, and Crawford was eventually expelled.

=== Role in the partition of Ireland ===
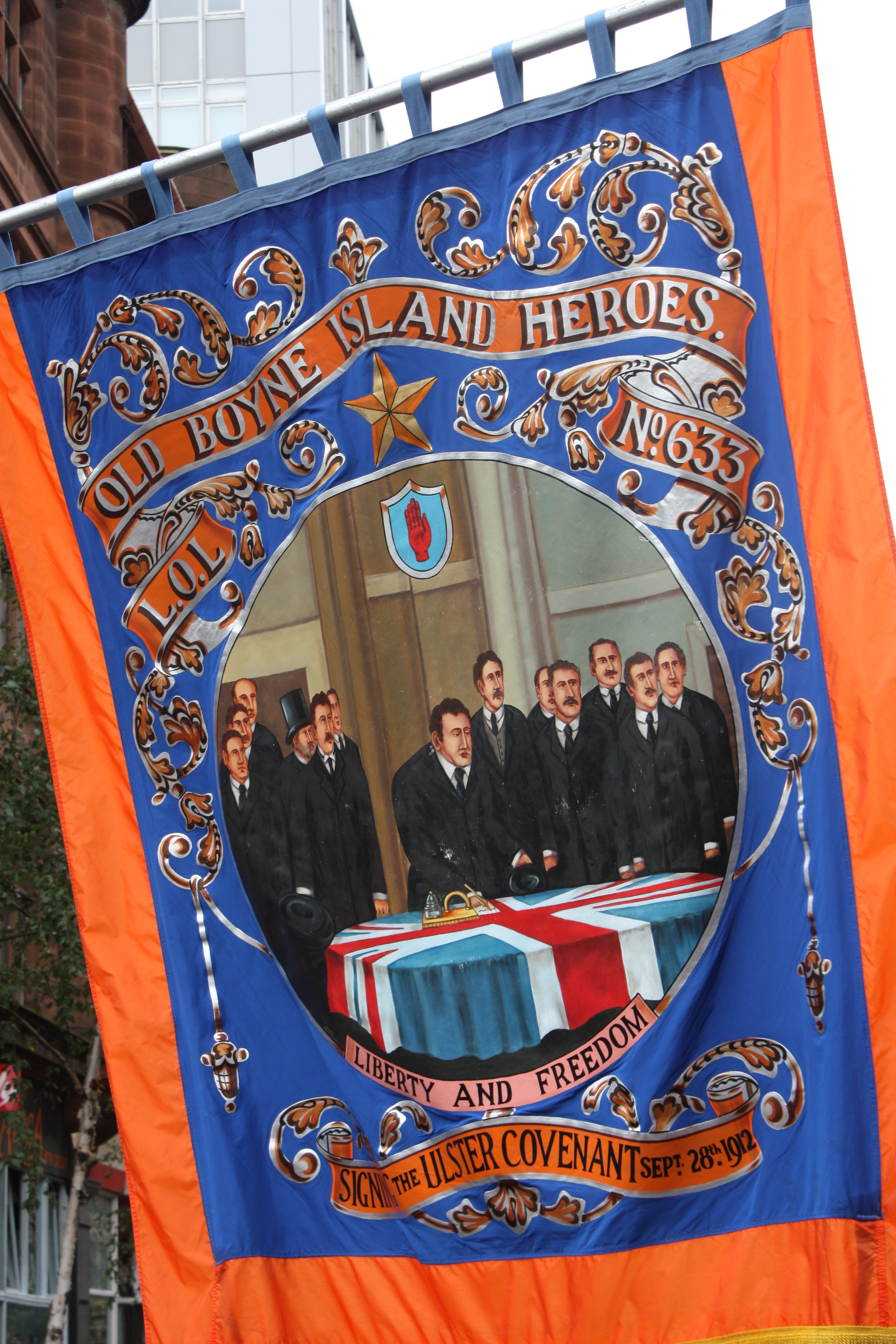
An Orange banner showing the signing of the Ulster Covenant

From the outset, the Orange Order was instrumental in the formation of a distinct Ulster unionism. In 1905, when the Ulster Unionist Council was established to bring together unionists in the north, the Order was given 50 of 200 seats. It was a position within the constitution of the Ulster Unionist Party that the order was to maintain until voting to sever ties with the party in 2005.

In 1912, the Third Home Rule Bill was introduced in the House of Commons. However, its introduction would be delayed until 1914. The Orange Order, along with the British Conservative Party and unionists in general, were inflexible in opposing the bill. The Order helped to organise the 1912 Ulster Covenant – a pledge to oppose Home Rule which was signed by up to 500,000 people. In 1911, some Orangemen began to arm themselves and train as militias. In 1913, the Ulster Unionist Council decided to bring these groups under central control, creating the Ulster Volunteer Force, an Ulster-wide militia dedicated to resisting Home Rule. There was a strong overlap between Orange Lodges and UVF units. A large shipment of rifles was imported from Germany to arm them in April 1914, in what became known as the Larne gun-running.

However, the crisis was interrupted by the outbreak of the World War I in August 1914, which caused the Home Rule Bill to be suspended for the duration of the war. Many Orangemen served in the war with the 36th (Ulster) Division, suffering heavy losses, and commemorations of their sacrifice are still an important element of Orange ceremonies.

The Fourth Home Rule Act was passed as the Government of Ireland Act 1920; the six northeastern counties of Ulster became Northern Ireland and the other twenty-six counties became Southern Ireland. This time period saw intense cross community conflict/violence which took place intermittently and mostly in Belfast. (see The Troubles in Ulster (1920–1922)) This self-governing entity within the United Kingdom was confirmed in its status under the terms of the Anglo-Irish Treaty of 1921, and in its borders by the Boundary Commission agreement of 1925. Southern Ireland became first the Irish Free State in 1922 and then in 1949 a Republic.

=== Since 1921 ===
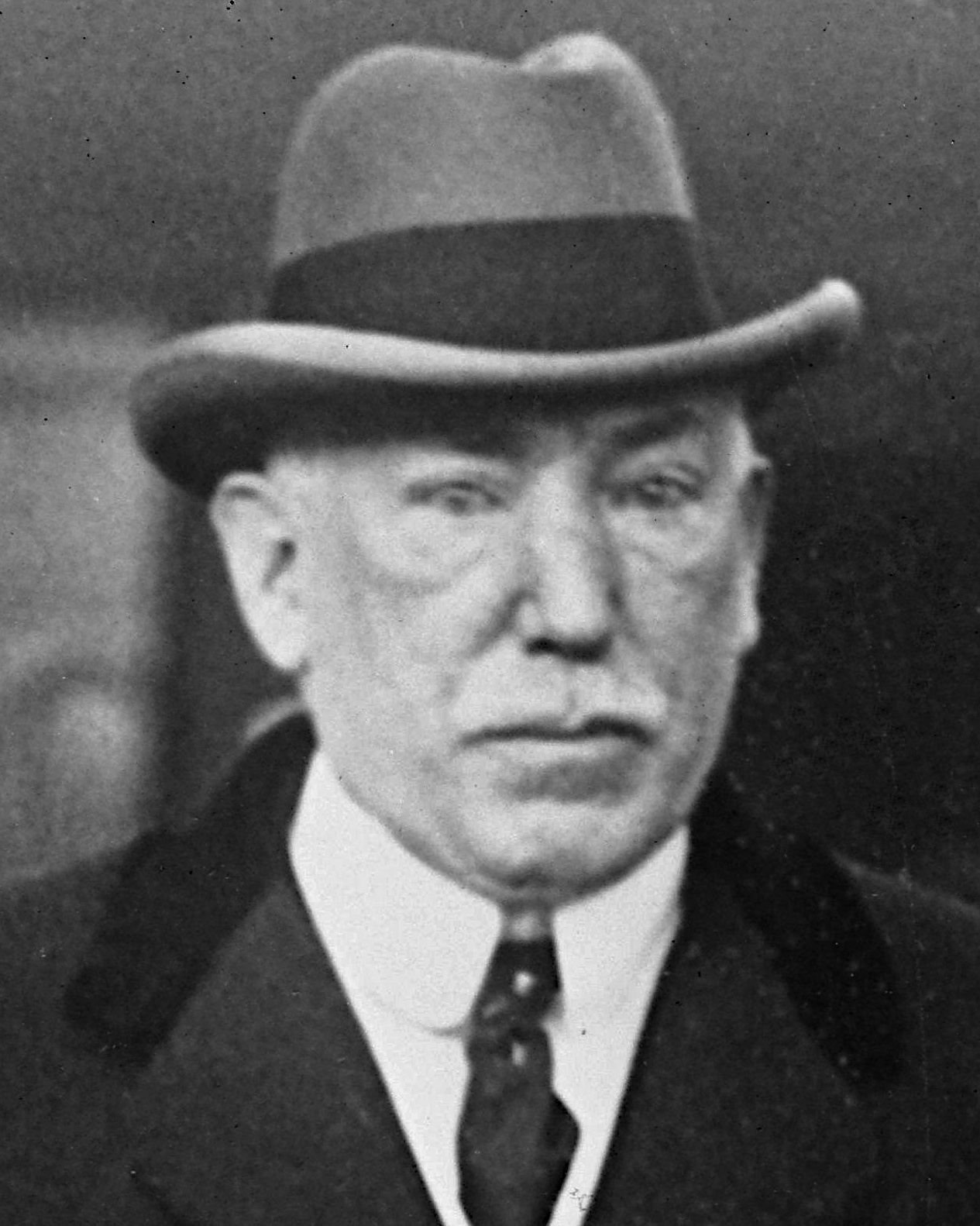
Orangeman James Craig, the first Prime Minister of Northern Ireland

The Orange Order had a central place in the new state of Northern Ireland. From 1921 to 1969, every prime minister of Northern Ireland was an Orangeman and member of the Ulster Unionist Party (UUP); all but three Cabinet ministers were Orangemen; all but one unionist senators were Orangemen; and 87 of the 95 MPs who did not become Cabinet Ministers were Orangemen. James Craig, the first Prime Minister of Northern Ireland, maintained always that Ulster was in effect Protestant and the symbol of its ruling forces was the Orange Order. In 1932, Craig maintained that "ours is a Protestant government and I am an Orangeman". This was in response to a speech the year before by Éamon de Valera in the Irish Free State claiming that Ireland was a "Catholic nation" in a debate about protests against Protestant woman Letitia Dunbar-Harrison being appointed as County Librarian in County Mayo. Two years later he stated: "I have always said that I am an Orangeman first and a politician and a member of this parliament afterwards ... All I boast is that we have a Protestant Parliament and a Protestant State".

At its peak in 1965, the Order's membership was around 70,000, which meant that roughly 1 in 5 adult Ulster Protestant males were members. Since 1965, it has lost a third of its membership, especially in Belfast and Derry. The Order's political influence suffered greatly after the unionist-controlled government of Northern Ireland was abolished in 1973. In 2012, it was stated that estimated membership of the Orange Order was around 34,000.

After the outbreak of "the Troubles" in 1969, the Grand Orange Lodge of Ireland encouraged Orangemen to join the Northern Ireland security forces, especially the Royal Ulster Constabulary (RUC) and the British Army's Ulster Defence Regiment (UDR). The response from Orangemen was strong. Over 300 Orangemen were killed during the conflict, the vast majority of them members of the security forces. Some Orangemen also joined loyalist paramilitary groups. During the conflict, the Order had a fractious relationship with loyalist paramilitary groups, the Democratic Unionist Party (DUP), the Independent Orange Order and the Free Presbyterian Church. The Order urged its members not to join these organisations, and it is only recently that some of these intra-unionist breaches have been healed.

==== Drumcree dispute ====
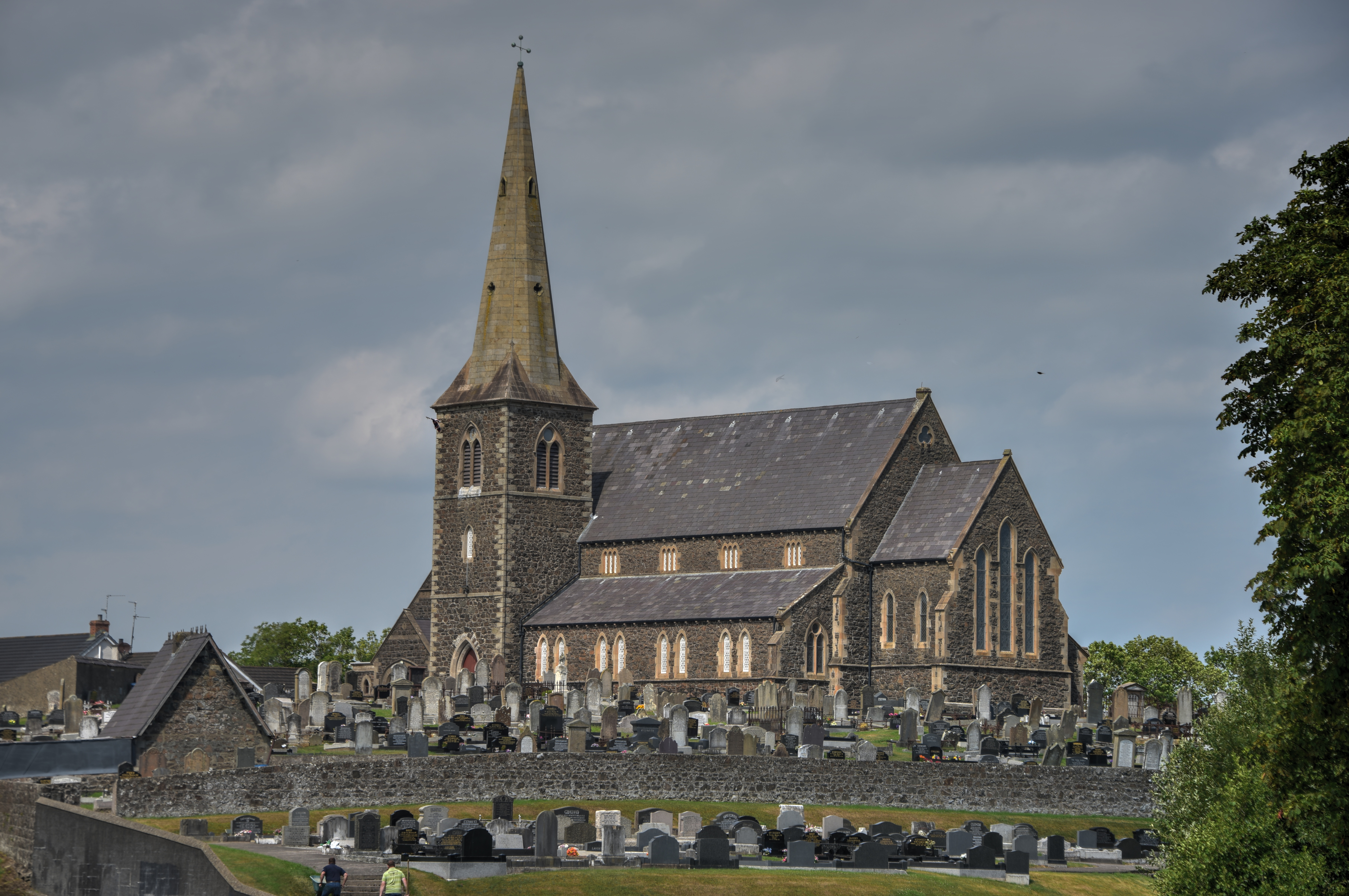
Drumcree Church in Portadown that was the focus of a conflict between Protestants and Catholics during the Troubles.

The Drumcree dispute is perhaps the most well-known episode involving the Order since 1921. On the Sunday before 12 July each year, Orangemen in Portadown would traditionally march to-and-from Drumcree Church. Originally, most of the route was farmland, but is now the densely populated Catholic part of town. The residents have sought to re-route the march away from this area, seeing it as "triumphalist" and "supremacist".

There have been intermittent violent clashes during the march since the 19th century. The onset of the Troubles led to the dispute intensifying in the 1970s and 1980s. At this time, the most contentious part of the march was the outward leg along Obins Street. After serious violence two years in a row, the march was banned from Obins Street in 1986. The focus then shifted to the return leg along Garvaghy Road.

Each July from 1995 to 2000, the dispute drew worldwide attention as it sparked protests and violence throughout Northern Ireland, prompted a massive police/army operation, and threatened to derail the peace process. The situation in Portadown was likened to a "war zone" and a "siege". During this time, supporters of the Orangemen murdered at least six Catholic civilians. In 1995 and 1996, residents succeeded in stopping the march. This led to a standoff at Drumcree between the security forces and thousands of loyalists. Following a wave of loyalist violence, the march was allowed through. In 1997, security forces locked down the Catholic area and forced the march through, citing loyalist threats. This sparked widespread protests and violence by Irish nationalists. From 1998 onward the march was banned from Garvaghy Road and the Catholic area was sealed-off with large barricades. For a few years, there was an annual major standoff at Drumcree and widespread loyalist violence. Since 2001, things have been relatively calm, but the Order still campaigns for the right to march on Garvaghy Road. The dispute led to a short-lived boycott of businesses owned by Orangemen and their supporters elsewhere in the region.

==== The Orange Standard ====
In the 1970s, Northern Ireland was in the grip of The Troubles. The Orange Order felt that the media from around the world painted them in a biased and negative light, favouring the republican side. In 1971, the Grand Orange Lodge of Ireland held a committee to combat this and needed a voice to speak on the side of Unionists. In 1972, they outlined a newspaper to avoid Unionists from feeling isolated, promote the principles of the Reformation and the Glorious Revolution and act as a monthly news source for the Orange Order, Protestants and Unionists.

In January 1973, The Orange Standard released its first edition. It also featured information about other lodges around the world, as well as key dates and locations for Orange marches. In 2017, they started releasing the newspaper as an option in digital format.

==== Membership rates ====
Membership of the Order was historically lower in areas where Protestants are in the majority, and vice versa. In County Fermanagh, where the Catholic and Protestant populations are close to parity, membership in 1971 was three times as high as in the more Protestant counties of Antrim and Down, where it was just over 10% of adult Protestant males. Other factors that are associated with high rates of membership are levels of unemployment that more closely match Catholic levels, and low levels of support for the Democratic Unionist Party among unionists.

== Global expansion ==
=== Africa ===
Orangeism in Africa dates to the mid-19th century, with the earliest lodge established in Freetown, Sierra Leone. Expansion into Nigeria followed in the late 19th century with the founding of Lagos Fine Blues (LOL No. 801) and Africa's first women's lodge.

In South Africa, the influence through Orangeism peaked with 26 Orange lodges in the nineteenth century. The Grand Orange Lodge of British South Africa was formed in 1905.

By the 1920s, Nigerian lodges had transitioned to entirely African leadership under Grand Master E. A. Ojo. While the Nigerian movement declined in the 1960s, it seeded growth in Ghana and Togo, where national Grand Lodges remain active. They are known as the Grand Lodge of Ghana and the Grand Lodge of Togo respectively.

In 1994, the international profile of the African lodges was elevated when Emmanuel Aboki Essien of Togo became the first African to serve as President of the Imperial Orange Council. Despite suppression during the 1980s under the Rawlings regime, the Ghanaian Order rebuilt in the 1990s with support from the Grand Orange Lodge of Scotland.

=== Asia ===
Orangeism in Asia was historically linked to British military regiments and colonial administrative services. In the early 20th century, lodges such as LOL No. 899 (Sialkot, India), LOL No. 802 (Hong Kong), and LOL No. 615 (Singapore) were active among expatriate and military populations. The Sialkot lodge was known as "Rising Sons of India" and was primarily made of soldiers from the 1st Battalion Royal Irish Rifles. This is now a part of Pakistan's territory. Orange Lodges existed on the Philippine Islands. These lodges served their purpose during the colonial period, but did not survive the mid-20th-century period of decolonization and the Second World War.

The British Empire granted the pathway for expansion of the Orange Order. British and Irish military regiments, missionaries and administrators allowed for lodge establishment in countries under the British Empire. This includes Mandatory Palestine and British India.

=== Oceania ===
The Grand Orange Lodge of Australia serves as the umbrella organization for the state-level jurisdictions. The first lodge was founded in Melbourne in 1843, following sectarian tensions during local elections. In Sydney, the first lodge was formally established in 1845 by members of British military regiments (notably the 17th, 50th, and 63rd Regiments).

The Order grew rapidly in the mid-to-late 19th century. After the 1868 attempted assassination of Prince Alfred, Duke of Edinburgh, by Fenian Henry James O’Farrell in Sydney, membership surged as "loyalist" sentiment spiked.

In New Zealand, the Orange Order was influential during the premiership of William Massey. The Order was first established in Auckland in 1842 at the Osprey Inn. The Grand Orange Lodge of New Zealand oversees all lodges on the north and south islands of New Zealand. It was established in 1908.

New Zealand was early to adopt formal structures for women, with the first women's Orange lodge opening in Wellington in September 1888.

=== North America ===
The Orange Order historically had a significant influence in Canadian politics from the mid-19th century through the mid-20th century. Under the leadership of Ogle Robert Gowan, it became a pillar of the Conservative Party and a fierce defender of British identity in Canada, particularly in Ontario and Newfoundland.

In the United States, the Orange Order was primarily an immigrant fraternal society. It is most noted in American history for the 1870 Orange Riots in New York City, which highlighted sectarian tensions among the Irish diaspora. Violent clashes broke out when Irish Catholic groups attempted to block Orangemen from parading to celebrate the Battle of the Boyne. The 1871 riot was particularly bloody, with the result of over 60 deaths and requiring the intervention of the New York National Guard. The majority of the riot took place outside Lamartine Hall, the Supreme Grand Orange Lodge of the United States Headquarters on Eighth Avenue, Manhattan.

The first orange parade in America was held in Boston in 1824. The Grand Orange Lodge of America is known as the Loyal Orange Institution of the United States of America. This came in 1870, following request from the Grand Lodge of Ireland, who approved them as being officially associated with the Orange Institution.

==== The Caribbean and Central America ====
Minor Orange Lodges have existed in British Honduras (now Belize), Cuba, and Bermuda. In these specific Caribbean and colonial outposts, the presence of the Orange Order came directly to British military garrisons and expatriate merchants as Protestant immigrants settled in the colonies under the British Empire.

== Symbols ==
The Orange Order's name stems from the Orange Associations, a name that recognized the landing of William of Orange in England and the start of the Glorious Revolution of 1688. Its flag, known as the Boyne Standard or Orange Standard, has a field of orange with a purple star and a St. George's Cross in the upper left corner. Orange represents the monarchs in the House of Orange.

Biblical symbols that the Orange Order use include the Holy Writ, Holy Bible, Aaron's Rod and Jacob's Ladder. These are often worn on collarettes.

== Beliefs and activities ==
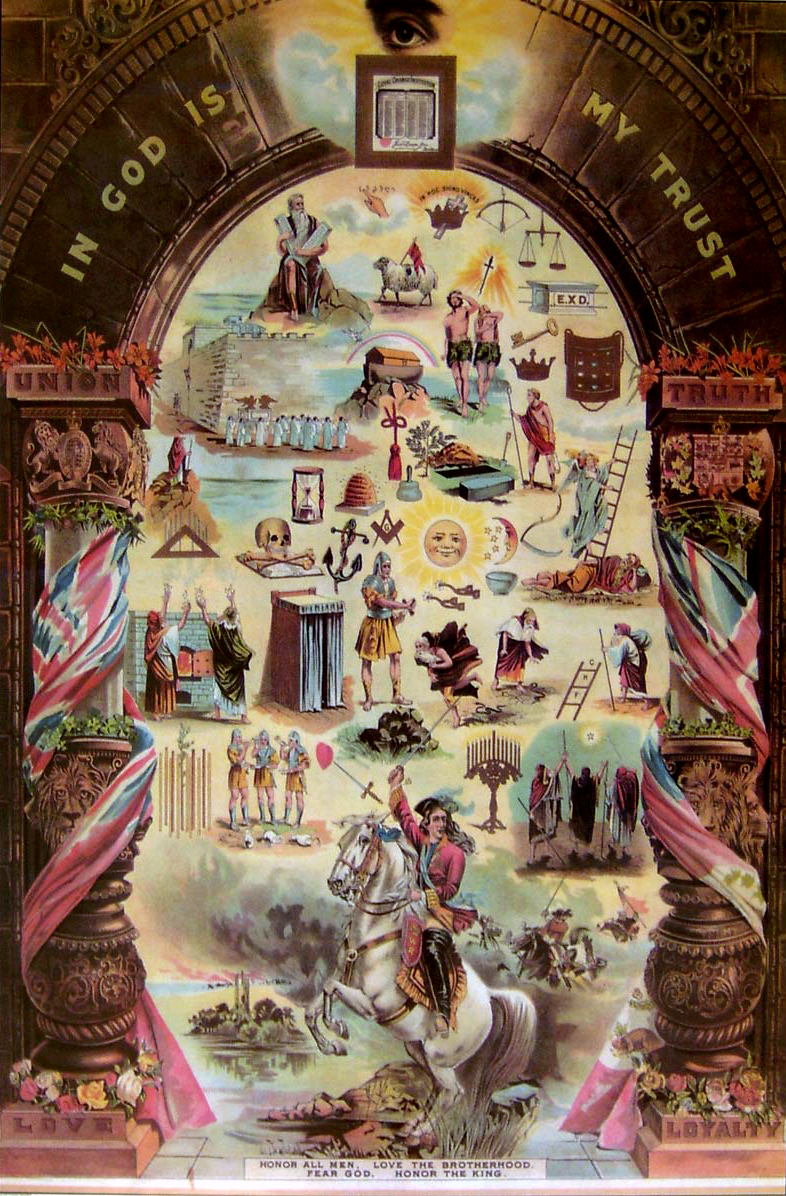
Orange Order poster depicting historical and religious symbols

=== Protestantism ===
The basis of the modern Orange Order is the promotion and propagation of "biblical Protestantism" and the principles of the Reformation. As such the Order only accepts those who confess a belief in a Protestant religion. Catholics and Orthodox Christians, non-creedal and non-Trinitarian Christians, atheists and members of non-Christian religions are banned. This includes members of the Church of Jesus Christ of Latter-day Saints (Mormons), Jehovah's Witnesses, Unitarians, and Quakers.

Previous rules specifically forbade Roman Catholics and their close relatives from joining but the current rules use the wording "non-reformed faith" instead. Converts to Protestantism can join by appealing to the Grand Lodge.

==== Masonic influences ====
James Wilson and James Sloan, who issued the warrants for the first Lodges of the Orange Order along with 'Diamond' Dan Winter, were Freemasons, and in the 19th century many Irish Republicans regarded the Orange Order as a front group established by Unionist Masons as a more violent and jingoist vehicle for the promotion of Unionism. Some anti-Masonic evangelical Christian groups have claimed that the Orange Order is still influenced by freemasonry. Many Masonic traditions survive, such as the organisation of the Order into lodges. The Order has a similar system of degrees through which new members advance. These degrees are interactive plays with references to the Bible. There is particular concern over the ritualism of higher degrees such as the Royal Arch Purple and the Royal Black Institutions.

==== Sabbatarianism ====
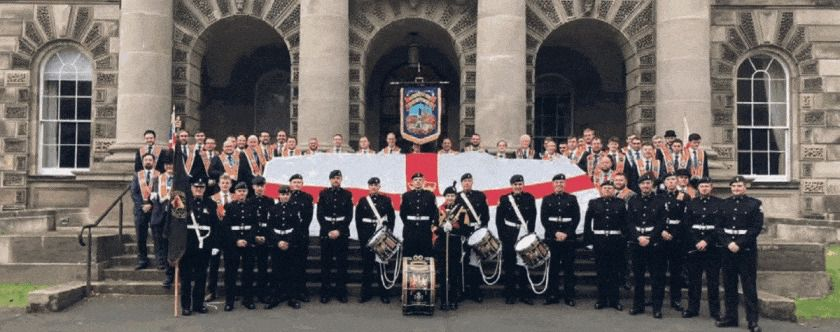
Queen's LOL 1845 annual service at Union Theological College.

The Order considers important the Fourth Commandment, and forbids work, or non-religious activity generally, on Sundays. Parades are traditionally allowed on Sundays, including the Drumcree parade, which was held from 1807 until 1997 on the last Sunday before the Twelfth. In March 2002, the Order threatened "to take every action necessary, regardless of the consequences" to prevent the Ballymena Show from being held on a Sunday. The County Antrim Agricultural Association complied with the Order's wishes.

=== Politics ===
The Orange Order is strongly linked to British unionism. This is a political ideology that supports the continued unity of the United Kingdom. Unionism is thus opposed to, for example, Irish reunification, Scottish independence and Welsh independence.

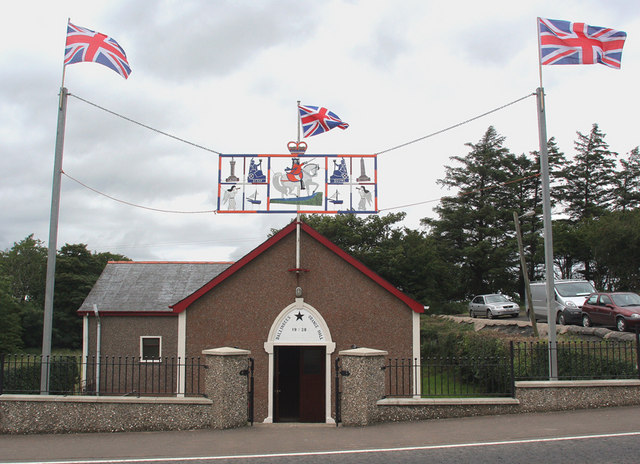
An Orange Hall in Ballinrees bedecked with Union Flags

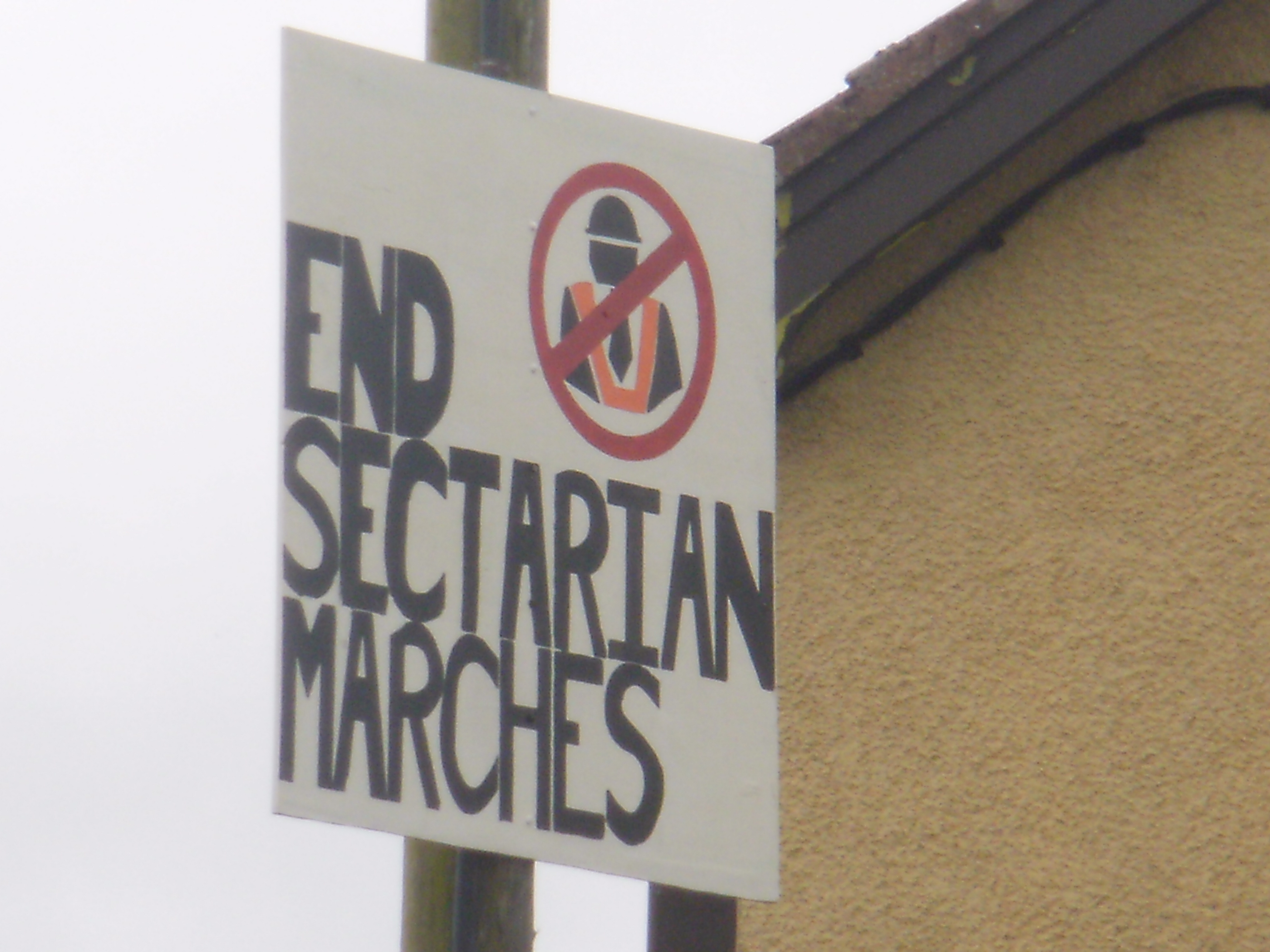
An anti "Sectarian March" sign in Rasharkin

The Order, from its very inception, was an overtly political organisation. In 1905, when the Ulster Unionist Council (UUC) was formed, the Orange Order was entitled to send delegates to its meetings. The UUC was the decision-making body of the Ulster Unionist Party (UUP). Between 1922 and 1972, the UUP was consistently the largest party in the Northern Ireland Parliament, and all Prime Ministers of Northern Ireland and the vast majority of senior UUP figures were members. Due to its close links with the UUP, the Orange Order exerted great influence. The Order was the force behind the UUP no-confidence votes in reformist Prime Ministers Terence O'Neill (1969), James Chichester-Clark (1969–71), and Brian Faulkner (1972–74). At the outbreak of The Troubles in 1969, the Order encouraged its members to join the Northern Ireland security forces.

The Democratic Unionist Party (DUP) attracted the most seats in an election for the first time in 2003. DUP leader Ian Paisley had been clashing with the Order since 1951, when the Order banned members of Paisley's Free Presbyterian Church from acting as Orange chaplains and later, from the 1970s, when it openly endorsed the UUP against the DUP. But by the turn of the century, Orangemen had begun to vote for the DUP in large numbers due to their opposition to the Good Friday Agreement.

In 2005, the Order decided to cut its ties to the UUP, ending the 100-year institutional linkage. Speaking to the decision, Grand Master Robert Saulters noted:

When the UUC was established there was only one Unionist Party. That is no longer the case and we feel that arrangements made in 1905 are no longer relevant to the political scene in Northern Ireland in 2005. ...The Loyal Orange Institution will continue to lobby for the unionist cause as events require and we will seek to establish good relationships with all those engaged in the political interests of the unionist people.

Several high-profile Orangemen were already DUP MPs and strategists.

In December 2009, the Orange Order held secret talks with the two unionist parties. The main goal of the talks was to foster greater unity between the two parties in the run-up to the May 2010 general election. Sinn Féin's Alex Maskey said the talks exposed the Order as a "very political organisation". Shortly after the election, Grand Master Robert Saulters called for a "single unionist party" to maintain the union. He said the Order had members "who represent all the many shades of unionism" and warned, "we will continue to dilute the union if we fight and bicker among ourselves".

In the October 2010 issue of The Orange Standard, Saulters called 'dissident' Irish republican paramilitaries the "Roman Catholic IRA". SDLP MLA John Dallat asked Justice Minister David Ford to find if Saulters had broken the hate speech laws. He said: "Linking the Catholic community or indeed any community to terror groups is inciting weak-minded people to hatred, and surely history tells us what that has led to in the past". In a 2011 survey of 1,500 Orangemen throughout Northern Ireland, over 60% believed that "most Catholics are IRA sympathisers".

In 2015, the Grand Orange Lodge of Ireland made a submission to the Northern Ireland Department of Arts, Culture and Leisure opposing the introduction of an Irish Language Bill. In its submission, the Lodge said it respected "Irish as one of the indigenous languages of the British Isles" but argued an Irish Language Act would promote inequality because it would be "directed towards a section of the Roman Catholic community".

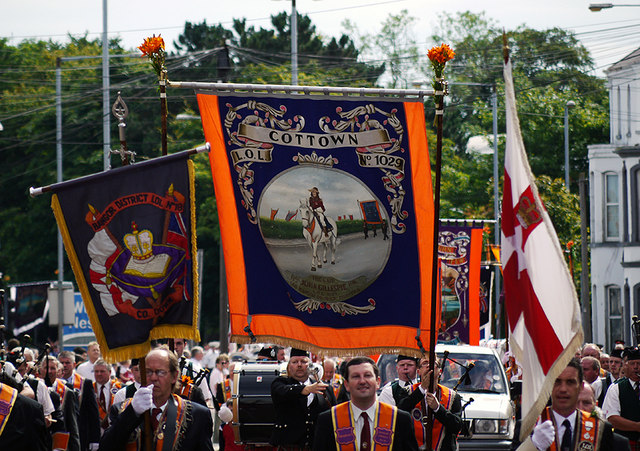
Orangemen parading in Bangor on 12 July 2010

=== Parades ===
Parades are a big part of the Order's activities. Orange lodges are accompanied by marching bands. These bands include flag bearers, who make up a colour party, as well as flute, accordion, brass and pipe bands. Most Orange lodges hold a yearly parade from their Orange hall to a local church. The denomination of the church is quite often rotated, depending on local demographics.

The highlights of the Orange year are the parades leading up to the celebrations on the Twelfth of July. The Twelfth, however, remains in places a deeply divisive issue, not least because of the alleged triumphalism, anti-Catholicism and anti-Irish nationalism of the Orange Order. In recent years, most Orange parades have passed peacefully. All but a handful of the Orange Order parades, at so-called "interface areas" where the two communities live next to each other, are peaceful. The venues used for the annual Twelfth parades are located throughout the six counties of Northern Ireland, with County Down having the most venues, with thirty-three. Counties Armagh and Fermanagh, having smaller populations, both have twelve host venues. Some smaller villages such as Carrickmore, Cushendall, Rostrevor, Crossmaglen and Draperstown are not marched in at all and areas with a sizeable population like Coalisland and Dungiven have never been the host for a major Twelfth parade.

The Carrick Day annual parade marks the landing of King William III, held in Carrickfergus. A re-enactment takes place beside Carrickfergus Castle.

The 1st of July annual parade commemorates the 36th Ulster Division in the Battle of the Somme.

Reformation Day is an annual parade held at the end of October commemorating the beginning of the Protestant Reformation. On 31 October 1517, Martin Luther is said to have presented his Ninety-five Theses in Wittenberg, Germany.

Lodge parades are a common event that takes place within the local lodge village or town. It is usually held to mark the anniversary of the Orange Lodge. A marching band accompanies them during the march.

The Grand Lodge of Ireland does not recognise the Parades Commission, which it sees as having been founded to target Protestant parades, as Protestants parade at ten times the rate of Catholics. 40% of Grand Lodge delegates oppose official policy while 60% are in favour. Most of those opposed to Grand Lodge policy are from areas facing parade restrictions like Portadown District, Bellaghy, Derry City and Lower Ormeau.

In a 2011 survey of Orangemen throughout Northern Ireland, 58% said they should be allowed to march through Irish nationalist and Catholic areas with no restrictions; 20% said they should negotiate with residents first.

=== Orange halls ===
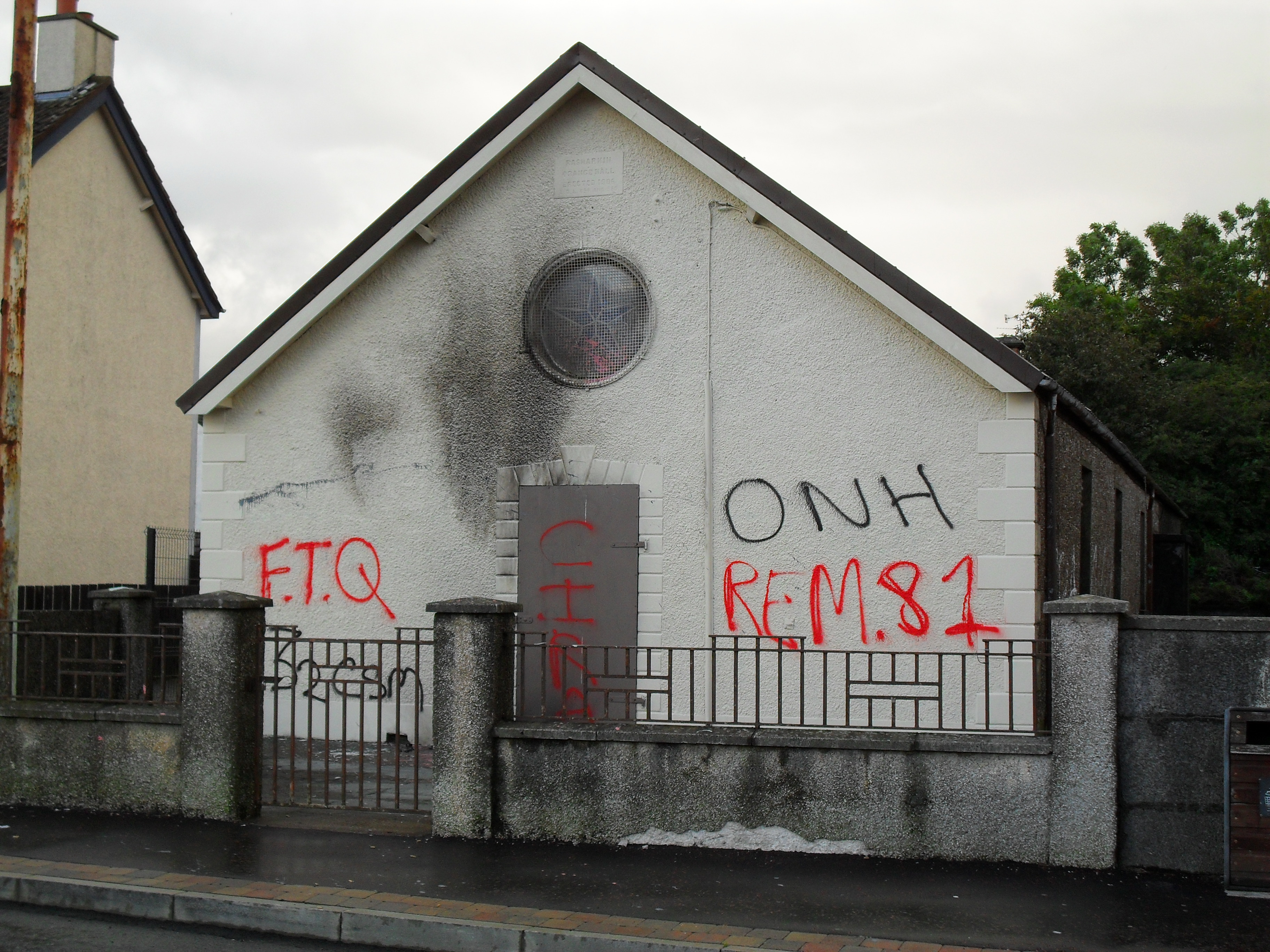
Rasharkin Orange hall daubed with republican graffiti

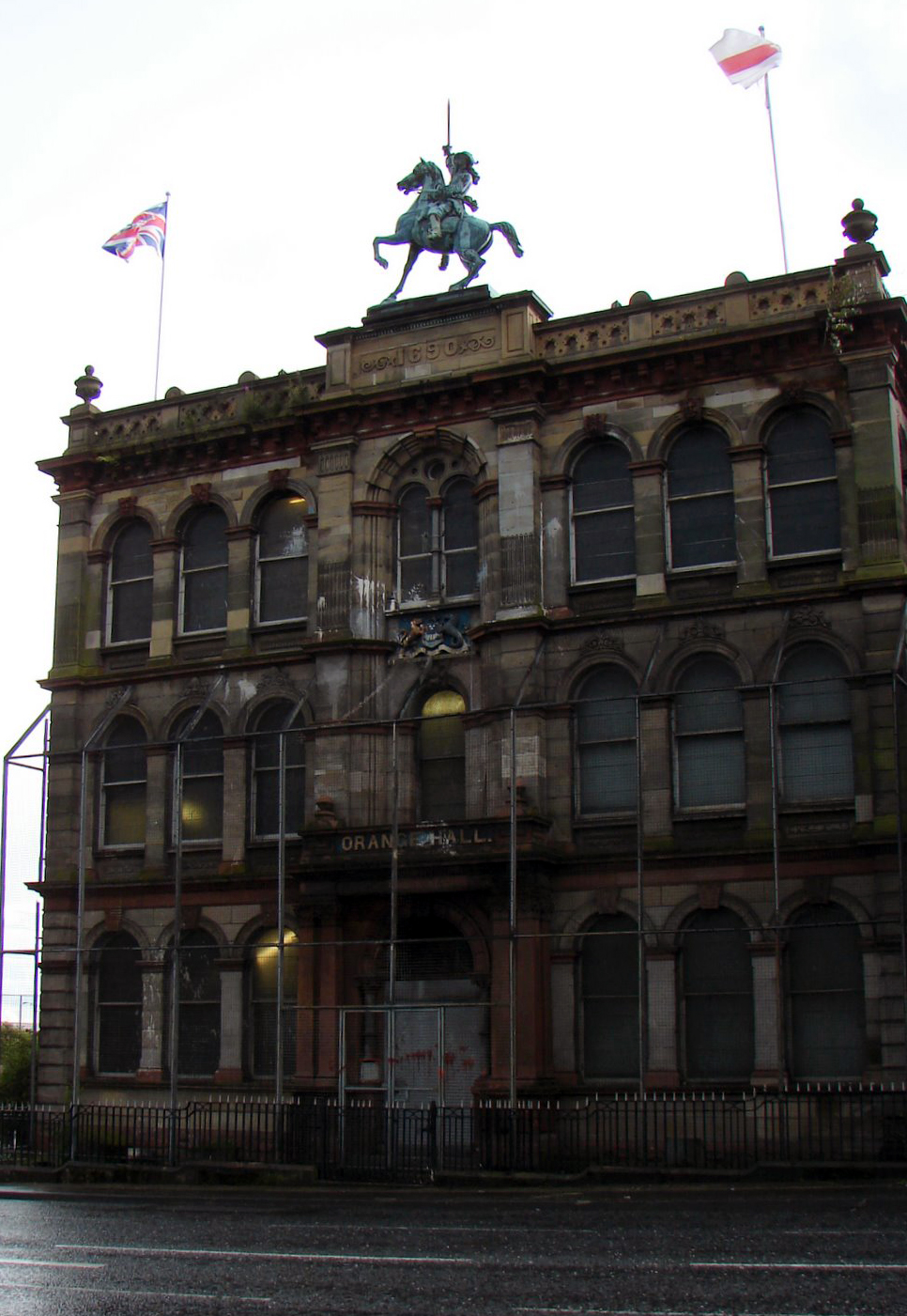
Clifton Street Orange Hall in Belfast designed by William Batt and completed in 1889, which has a protective cage. The equestrian statue on the roof by Harry Hems is the only one of King William III of Ireland, Scotland and England on any Orange hall in Ireland.

Monthly meetings are held in Orange halls. Orange halls on both sides of the Irish border often function as community halls for Protestants and sometimes those of other faiths, though this was more common in the past. The halls often host community groups such as credit unions, local marching bands, Ulster-Scots and other cultural groups as well as religious missions and unionist political parties.

Of Ireland's approximately 700 Orange halls, 282 have been targeted by arsonists since the Troubles began in 1968. Paul Butler, a prominent member of Sinn Féin, has said the arson is a "campaign against properties belonging to the Orange Order and other loyal institutions" by nationalists. On one occasion a member of Sinn Féin's youth wing was hospitalised after falling off the roof of an Orange hall. In several cases halls have been badly damaged or completely destroyed by arson, while others have been damaged by paint bombings, graffiti and other vandalism. The Order claims there is considerable evidence of an organised campaign of sectarian vandalism by Irish republicans. Former Grand Secretary Drew Nelson claimed In 2007 that statistical analysis shows this campaign began in the late 1980s and continues to the present.

=== Historiography ===
One of the Orange Order's activities is teaching members and the general public about William of Orange and associated subjects. Both the Grand Lodge and various individual lodges have published numerous booklets about William and the Battle of the Boyne, often aiming to show that they have continued relevance, and sometimes comparing the actions of William's adversary James II with those of the Northern Ireland Office. Furthermore, historical articles are often published in the Order's monthly newspaper The Orange Standard (available in a print edition and also electronically) and the Twelfth souvenir booklet. While William is the most frequent subject, other topics have included the Battle of the Somme (particularly the 36th (Ulster) Division's role in it), Saint Patrick (who the Order argues was not Roman Catholic), and the Protestant Reformation.

There are at least two Orange Lodges in Northern Ireland that they claim represent Saint Patrick's heritage and religious ethos. The best known is the Cross of Saint Patrick LOL (Loyal Orange lodge) 688, instituted in 1968 to (re)claim Saint Patrick. The lodge has had several well-known members, including Robert Bradford MP, who was the lodge chaplain who himself was killed by the Provisional IRA, the late Ernest Baird. Nelson McCausland of the DUP and Gordon Lucy, Director of the Ulster Society are the more prominent members within the lodge membership. In the 1970s there was also a Belfast lodge called Oidhreacht Éireann (Ireland's Heritage) LOL 1303, which argued that the Irish language and Gaelic culture were not the exclusive property of Catholics or republicans.

William was supported by the Pope in his campaigns against James' backer Louis XIV of France, a fact sometimes left out of Orange histories.

Occasionally the Order and the more fundamentalist Independent Order publishes historical arguments based more on religion than on history. British Israelism, which claims that the British people are descended from the Israelites and that Queen Elizabeth II is a direct descendant of the Biblical King David, has at times been advanced in Orange publications.

In 2015, the Grand Orange Lodge of Ireland and the County Armagh Grand Orange Lodge opened two Museum of Orange Heritage sites through a joint project. As a part of the EU PEACE III Programme, a grant of £3.6 million was awarded to the Orange Order. The initiative saw the addition of new interpretive centers at both the expanded GOLI headquarters at Schomberg House in Belfast and Sloan's House in Loughgall that feature historical artefacts and historical information on events from the Orange Order's creation to the present. For administrative use, the building contains a research institute and archive used by historians, as well as a public library.

=== War commemoration ===
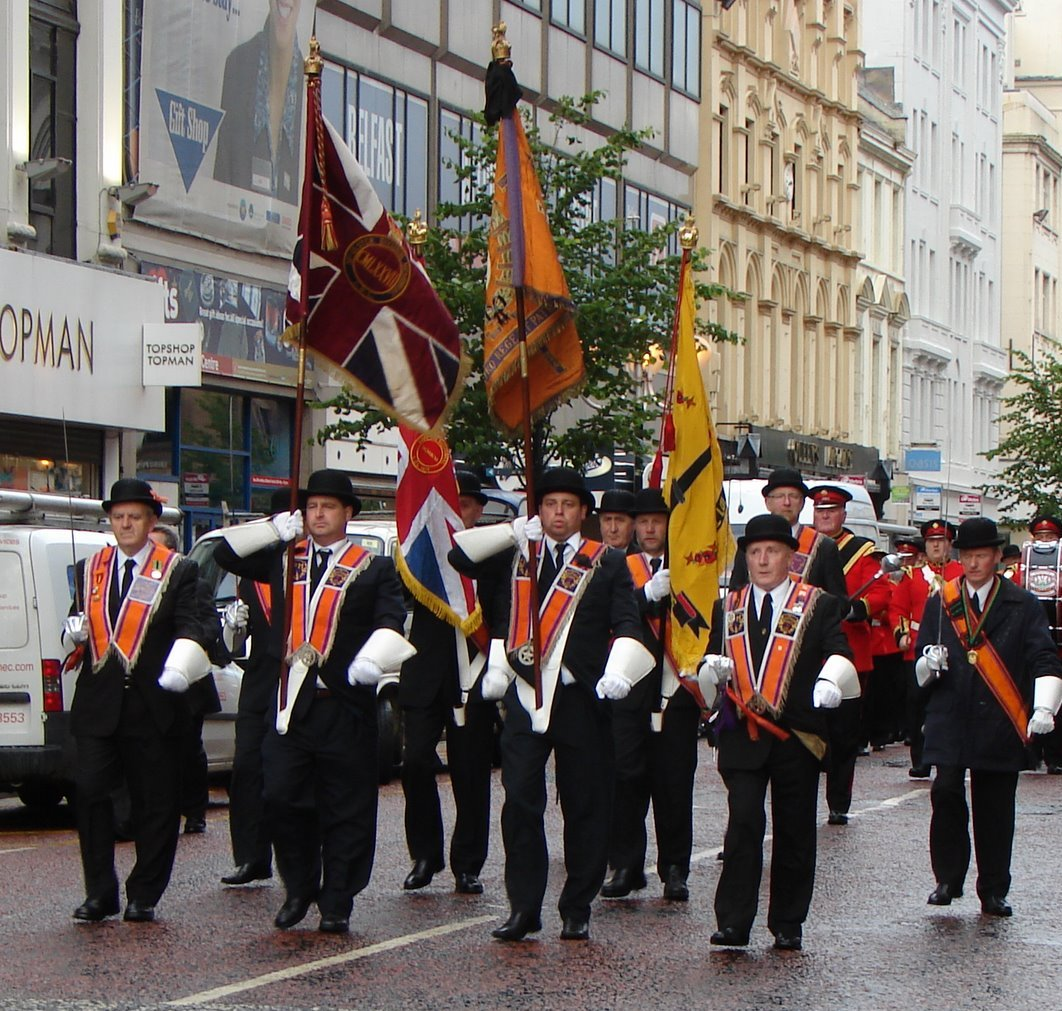
Thiepval Memorial Lodge parade in remembrance of the Battle of the Somme

The Order has been prominent in commemorating Ulster's war dead, particularly Orangemen and particularly those who died in the Battle of the Somme (1916) during World War I. There are many parades on and around 1 July in commemoration of the Somme, although the war memorial aspect is more obvious in some parades than others. There are several memorial lodges, and a number of banners depicting the Battle of the Somme, war memorials, or other commemorative images. In the grounds of the Ulster Tower Thiepval, which commemorates the men of the Ulster Division who died in the Battle of the Somme, a smaller monument pays homage to the Orangemen who died in the war.

=== Relationship with loyalist paramilitaries ===
Orangemen carrying a banner of killed UVF member and Orangeman Brian Robinson in 2003

The Orange Order has been criticised for associating with loyalist paramilitary groups such as the UVF and UDA, which are classified as terrorist organisations. However, it has publicly condemned terrorism and paramilitary violence. Some bands that appear at Orange marches openly display support for loyalist paramilitary groups by carrying paramilitary flags or sporting paramilitary names and emblems. For example, prominent loyalist John Gregg was a member of Cloughfern Young Conquerors band, while Coleraine-based Freeman Memorial band was named after a UVF member killed by his own bomb. It has also been claimed that paramilitary groups approach certain bands asking the band to carry a flag of their organisation, with financial assistance sometimes offered for doing so.

A number of prominent loyalist militants were members of the Orange Order at the same time. This includes Gusty Spence, Robert Bates, Davy Payne, David Ervine, John Bingham, George Seawright, Richard Jameson, Billy McCaughey, Robert McConnell and Ernie Elliott. The banner of Old Boyne Island Heroes Orange lodge bears the names of John Bingham and Shankill Butcher Robert Bates, who were both members. Another Shankill Butcher, UDR soldier Eddie McIlwaine, was pictured taking part in an Orange march in 2003 with a bannerette of killed UVF member Brian Robinson (himself an Orangeman). McIlwaine was also pictured acting as a steward at a 2014 Orange march. An Orange Order spokesman refused to condemn McIlwaine's membership of the Order.

On 12 July 1972, at least fifty masked and uniformed members of the Ulster Defence Association (UDA) escorted an Orange march into the Catholic area of Portadown, saluting the Orangemen as they passed. That year, Orangemen formed a paramilitary group called the Orange Volunteers. This group "bombed a pub in Belfast in 1973 but otherwise did little illegal other than collect the considerable bodies of arms found in Belfast Orange Halls". Portadown Orangemen allowed known militants such as Seawright to take part in a 6 July 1986 march, contrary to a prior agreement. Seawright was a unionist politician and UVF member who had publicly proposed burning Catholics in ovens. As the march entered the town's Catholic district, the RUC seized Seawright and other known militants. The Orangemen attacked the officers with stones and other missiles.

When a July 1992 Orange march passed the scene of the Sean Graham bookmakers' shooting – in which the UDA killed five Catholic civilians—Orangemen shouted pro-UDA slogans and held aloft five fingers as a taunt to residents. Journalists Henry McDonald and Jim Cusack said images of Orangemen "gloating over the massacre" were beamed around the world and were a public relations disaster for the Order. Patrick Mayhew, then Secretary of State for Northern Ireland, said the marchers "would have disgraced a tribe of cannibals". The incident led to a more concerted effort by residents to have the marches banned from the area. In 2007, a banner commemorating UDA member Joe Bratty appeared at an Orange march. Bratty was said to have orchestrated the massacre.

Orange lodges in Britain have also been accused of links with loyalist paramilitaries. In the early years of The Troubles, the Order's Grand Secretary in Scotland toured Orange lodges for volunteers to "go to Ulster to fight". Thousands are believed to have volunteered, though only a few went to Ulster. During the 1970s an Orangeman – Roddy MacDonald – was the UDA's 'commander' in Scotland. In 1976, senior Scottish Orangemen tried to expel him after he admitted on television that he was a UDA leader and had smuggled weapons to Northern Ireland, but his expulsion was blocked by 300 Orangemen at a special disciplinary hearing. His successor as Scottish UDA commander, James Hamilton, was also an Orangeman. Many Scottish Orangemen were also convicted for loyalist paramilitary activity, and some Orange meetings raised funds for loyalist prisoners' welfare groups. In 2006, three Liverpool Orangemen were jailed for possession of weapons and UVF membership. Local MP Louise Ellman called for them to be expelled from the Order.

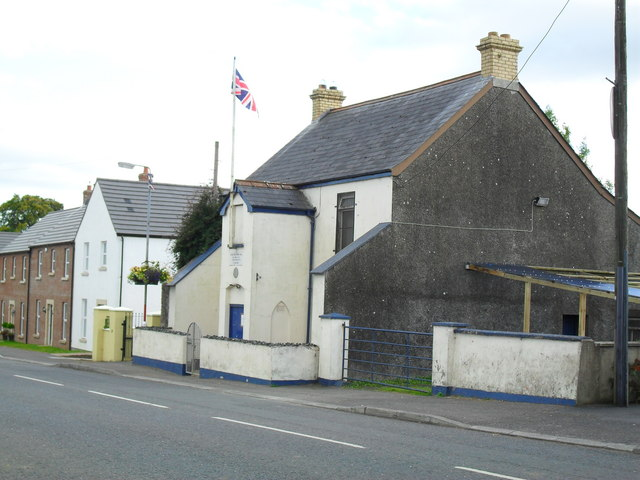
Stoneyford Orange Hall in County Antrim

During the Drumcree standoffs, loyalist militants publicly supported the Orangemen and launched waves of violence across NI in protest at the Orange march being blocked. They smuggled homemade weaponry to Drumcree, apparently unhindered by the Orangemen, and attacked police lines. Members of the UDA/UFF appeared at Drumcree with banners supporting the Orangemen. Portadown Orange Lodge said it could not stop such people from gathering, but added that it welcomed any support. Loyalist Volunteer Force (LVF) leader Billy Wright was frequently seen at Drumcree in the company of Harold Gracey, head of Portadown Orange Lodge. Gracey later attended a rally in support of Wright and refused to condemn the loyalist violence linked to the standoff.

In the late 1990s, Stoneyford Orange Hall was reported to be a focal point for the Orange Volunteers. After a police raid on the hall, two Orangemen were convicted for possession of "documents likely to be of use to terrorists", an automatic rifle, and membership of the Orange Volunteers. Their Orange lodge refused to expel them.

An Orangeman and DUP election candidate with links to the Real UFF in Antrim was jailed in 2013 for his part in a sectarian attack on a Polish family. He was expelled from the Order.

The Grand Orange Lodge of Ireland has issued several statements condemning violence and paramilitarism. Answering accusations of paramilitary links by Sinn Féin in 2011, an Orange spokesman said: "The Orange Order has consistently condemned all terrorist violence". In 2008, Armagh Orangemen condemned the flying of paramilitary flags. Denis Watson, the secretary of the Grand Lodge of Ireland, publicly called for anyone convicted of terrorist offences to be thrown out. Addressing a 12 July demonstration in 2000, Orangeman and Democratic Unionist politician Jeffrey Donaldson said: "It is essential that the Orange Order does not allow the paramilitaries to infiltrate its parades or hijack legitimate protests as a means of flaunting their aggression and engaging in displays of naked intimidation ... The Orange Order stands for higher ideals than this and must at every opportunity condemn the illegal activities of the paramilitaries and of all those who engage in acts of violence". Eric Kaufmann, in his book The New Unionism, writes: "The Orange Order actually took a firm stand against violence and paramilitarism throughout the Troubles. This opposition was rooted in the large contingent of Protestant clergymen who are built into the power structure of the Order. Young Orangemen were urged to join the RUC (police) or UDR (local security forces) and to stay away from paramilitaries".

== Requirements for entry ==
Most jurisdictions require both the spouse and parents of potential applicants to be Protestant, although the Grand Lodge can be appealed to make exceptions for converts. Members have been expelled for attending Catholic religious ceremonies. In the period from 1964 to 2002, 11% of those expelled from the Order were expelled for their presence at a Catholic religious event such as a baptism, service or funeral. This is based on Reformed Christian theology, which teaches that the Catholic Mass is idolatry, a view promulgated by Protestant Reformers such as Martin Luther.

The Order takes as its basis the Open Bible and historical Reformed documents such as the Presbyterian Westminster Confession, Anglican 39 Articles and other Protestant creeds.

== Structure ==
The Orange Institution in Ireland has the structure of a pyramid. At its base are about 1400 private lodges; every Orangeman belongs to a private lodge. Each private lodge sends six representatives to the district lodge, of which there are 126. Depending on size, each district lodge sends seven to thirteen representatives to the county lodge, of which there are 12. Each of these sends representatives to the Grand Orange Lodge of Ireland, which heads the Orange Order.

The Grand Lodge of Ireland has 373 members. As a result, much of the real power in the Order resides in the Central Committee of the Grand Lodge, which is made up of three members from each of the six counties of Northern Ireland (Down, Antrim, Armagh, Londonderry, Tyrone and Fermanagh) as well as the two other County Lodges in Northern Ireland, the City of Belfast Grand Lodge and the City of Londonderry Grand Orange Lodge, two each from the remaining Ulster counties (Cavan, Donegal and Monaghan), one from Leitrim, and 19 others. There are other committees of the Grand Lodge, including rules revision, finance, and education.

Despite this hierarchy, private lodges are basically autonomous as long as they generally obey the rules of the Institution. Breaking these can lead to suspension of the lodge's warrant – essentially the dissolution of the lodge – by the Grand Lodge, but this rarely occurs. Private lodges may disobey policies laid down by senior lodges without consequence. For example, several lodges have failed to expel members convicted of murder despite a rule that anyone convicted of a serious crime should be expelled, and Portadown lodges have negotiated with the Parades Commission in defiance of Grand Lodge policy that the commission should not be acknowledged.

Private lodges wishing to change Orange Order rules or policy can submit a resolution to their district lodge, which may submit it upwards until it eventually reaches the Grand Lodge.

All Lodge meetings commence with the reading of the Bible and prayers that non-practising Protestants, Catholics and people of other faiths and none, 'may become wise unto salvation' (a direct quotation from 2 Timothy 3:15 in the Bible).

== Related organisations ==
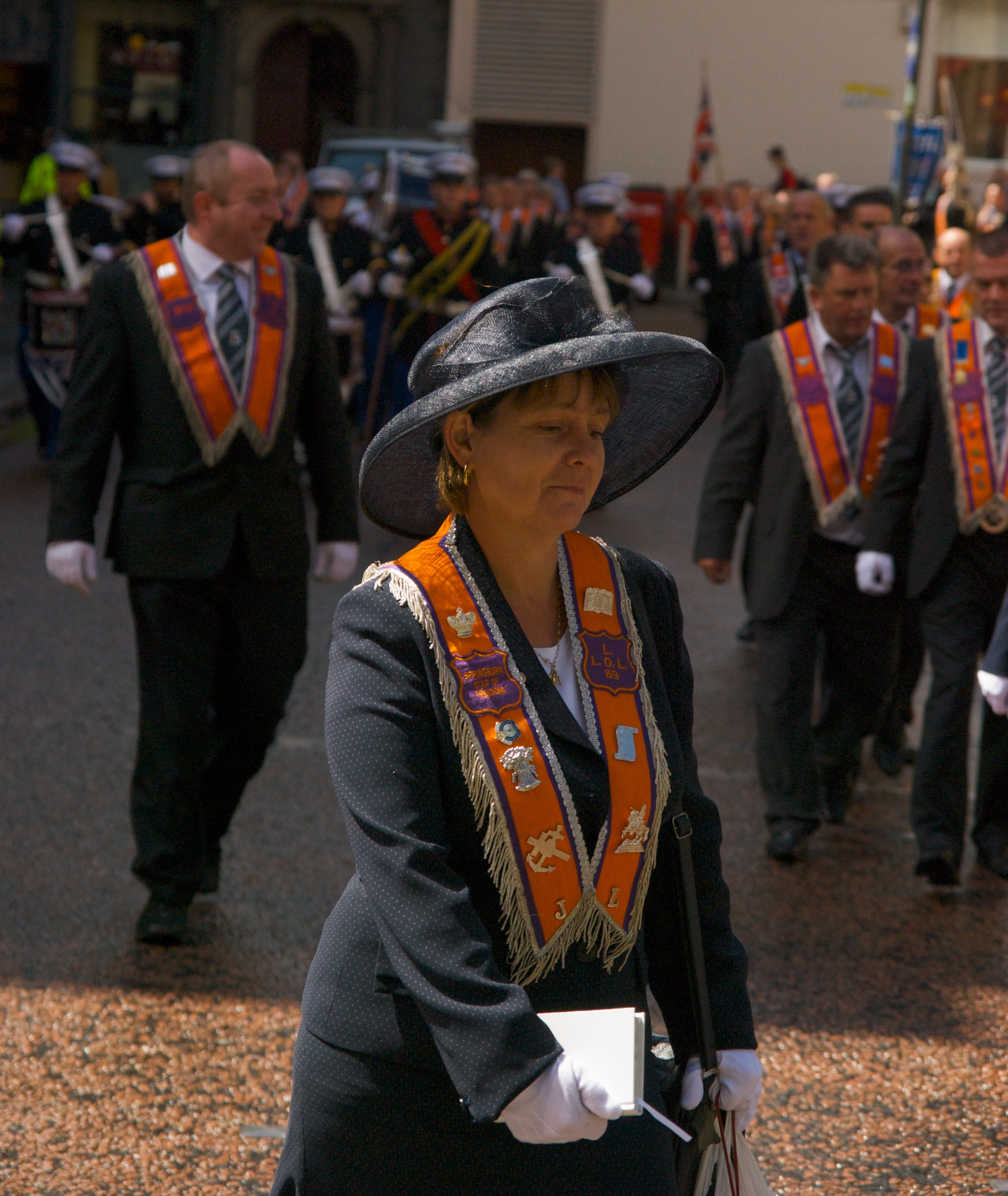
An Orangewoman marching in an Orange Order parade in Glasgow.

=== Association of Loyal Orangewomen of Ireland ===
A distinct women's organisation grew up out of the Orange Order. Called the Association of Loyal Orangewomen of Ireland, it was revived in December 1911 after having been dormant since the late 1880s. It has risen in prominence in recent years, largely due to protests in Drumcree. The women's order is parallel to the male order, and participates in its parades as much as the males apart from 'all male' parades and 'all ladies' parades respectively. The contribution of women to the Orange Order is recognised in the song "Ladies Orange Lodges O!".

=== Independent Orange Institution ===
The Independent Orange Institution was formed in 1903 by Thomas Sloan, who opposed the main Order's domination by Unionist Party politicians and the upper classes. A dispute between unionist candidates in East Belfast who were both Orangemen saw one expelled from the Order for embarrassing an Orange grandee who had apparently not voted against a nationalist motion. The Independent Order originally had radical tendencies, especially in the area of labour relations, but this soon faded. In the 1950s and 1960s the Independents focused primarily on religious issues, especially the maintenance of Sunday as a holy day and separation of politics from religion. With the outbreak of the Troubles, Ian Paisley began regularly speaking at Independent meetings, though he was never a member. As a result, the Independent Institution has become associated with Paisley and the Free Presbyterian Church of Ulster and Democratic Unionist Party. Recently the relationship between the two Orange Institutions has improved, with joint church services being held. Some believe this will ultimately result in a healing of the split that led the Independent Orange Institution to break away from the mainstream Order. Like the main Order, the Independent Institution parades and holds meetings on the Twelfth of July. It is based mainly in north Antrim.

=== Royal Black Institution ===
The Royal Black Institution was formed out of the Orange Order two years after the founding of the parent body. Although it is a separate organisation, one of the requirements for membership in the Royal Black is membership of the Orange Order and to be no less than 17 years old. The membership is exclusively male and the Royal Black Chapter is generally considered to be more religious and respectable in its proceedings than the Orange Order.

=== Apprentice Boys of Derry ===
The Apprentice Boys of Derry exist because of their acts during the siege of Derry from James II. Although they have no formal connection with the Orange Order, the two societies have overlapping membership.

== 'Diamond Dan' ==
As part of the rebranding of Orangeism to encourage younger people into a largely ageing membership, and as part of the planned rebranding of the July marches into an 'Orangefest', the 'superhero' Diamond Dan was created – named after one of its founding members, 'Diamond' Dan Winter – Diamond referring to the Institution's formation at the Diamond, Loughgall, in 1795.

Initially unveiled with a competition for children to name their new mascot in November 2007 (it was nicknamed 'Sash Gordon' by several parts of the British media); at the official unveiling of the character's name in February 2008, Orange Order education officer David Scott said Diamond Dan was meant to represent the true values of the Order: "the kind of person who offers his seat on a crowded bus to an elderly lady. He won't drop litter and he will be keen on recycling". There were plans for a range of Diamond Dan merchandise designed to appeal to children.

There was an uproar when it was revealed in the middle of the 'Marching Season' that Diamond Dan was a repaint of illustrator Dan Bailey's "Super Guy" character (often used by British computer magazines) taken without his permission.

== List of members ==
=== Grand Masters ===
Grand Masters of the Grand Orange Lodge of Ireland:

- 1795: William Blacker (Unofficial)
- 1798 Thomas Verner
- 1801: George Ogle
- 1818: Mervyn Archdall (to 1822)
- 1822?: Earl O'Neill
- 1828: Duke of Cumberland
- 1836: Earl of Roden (Unofficial)
- 1845: Earl of Enniskillen
- 1886: Earl of Erne
- 1914: Sir James Stronge, 5th Baronet
- 1915: William H. H. Lyons
- 1926: Sir Edward Archdale, 1st Baronet
- 1941: Sir Joseph Davison
- 1948: J. M. Andrews
- 1954: Sir William McCleery
- 1957: Sir George Clark, 3rd Baronet
- 1968: John Bryans
- 1971: Martin Smyth
- 1996: Robert Saulters
- 2011: Edward Stevenson
- 2025: Harold Henning

== University society ==
Students at Queen's University Belfast formed the first 'Student's Orange Society' in 2007, aiming to "educate the students of Queen's on the different aspects of the Orange Order." Alongside the society, "Rising Sons of William" Queen's Loyal Orange Lodge 1845 is for past and present students and staff.

Ulster University has Orange Societies in the regional campuses of Belfast and Coleraine. Ulster Covenant Memorial Loyal Orange Lodge 1984 is for students, staff and alumni of Ulster University.

Loyal Orange Lodge 1558 is an Orange Lodge in Trinity College Dublin for past and present students and staff members of the university. The Grand Orange Lodge approved the lodge warrant in 2018, and it was instituted in 2021 by Grand Master Edward Stevenson.

== See also ==
- Anti-Catholicism
- List of general fraternities
- List of Grand Orange Lodges
- Orange Heritage Week
- Orange Order in Canada
- Orange Order in the United States
- Orange Order in Africa
- Orange Order in New Zealand
- Orange Order In Australia
- Grand Orange Lodge of England
- Grand Orange Lodge of Scotland
- Orange Order in the Republic of Ireland
- Imperial Orange Council
- Presbyterian Church in Ireland
- Royal Black Institution
- Apprentice Boys of Derry
