= Robert Saulters =

Grand Master of Orange Order

- Born: Robert Saulters; March 1935 (age 91); West Belfast
- Occupations: Accountant, unionist
- Years active: 1996–2011
- Known for: Grand Master of the Orange Order
- Children: 2

Robert Sinclair Saulters (born March 1935) is a Northern Irish unionist who served as Grand Master of the Orange Order from 1996 to 2011.

He was born in west Belfast and previously worked as an accountant. He has served as a member of the Orange Order since c. 1952 and he is well known for leading the Orange Order during the Drumcree conflict.

On 12 July 1996, he criticised then Labour leader Tony Blair for his inter-denominational marriage to Roman Catholic Cherie Blair and serving communion in a Roman Catholic Church and claimed "He would sell his soul to the devil himself." Saulters later said in a BBC Radio 4 interview that he regretted his comments.

On 7 May 1998, Saulters and general secretary of the Orange Order John McCrea went to meet then Prime Minister Tony Blair at 10 Downing Street to discuss the conflict.

Saulters stepped down in November 2010, following the death of his wife Margaret Saulters. He was succeeded by Edward Stevenson in January 2011.
