= William Greathed =

British senior officer in the Bengal Engineers

Major-General William Greathed CB
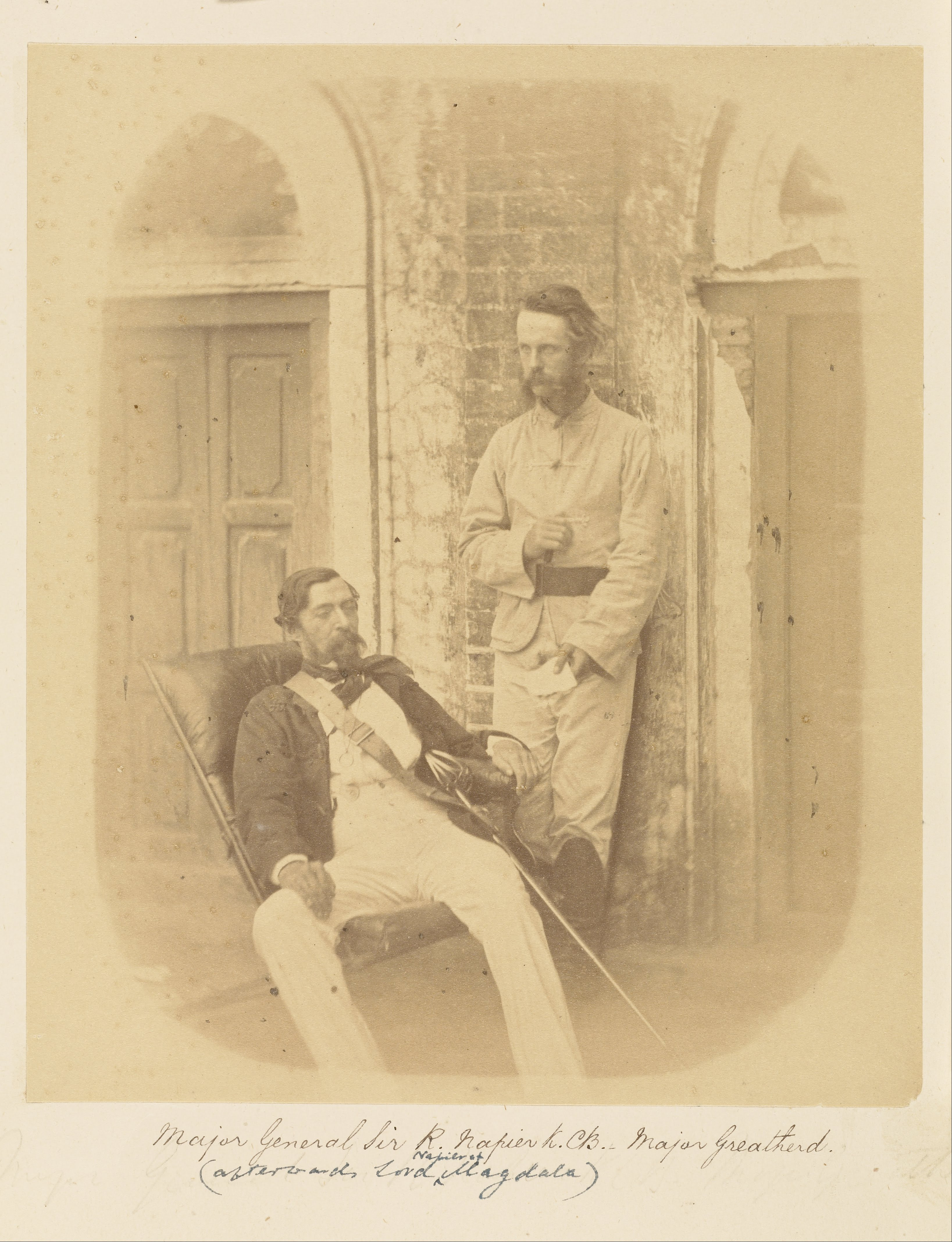
- Born: William Wilberforce Harris Greathed; 21 December 1826; Paris, France
- Died: 29 December 1878 (aged 52); Dorset, England
- Burial place: Hampreston, Dorset
- Relatives: Edward Harris Greathed (brother)
- Military career
- Allegiance: United Kingdom
- Branch: British Army
- Rank: Major-General
- Unit: Bengal Sappers and Miners
- Conflicts: Second Sikh War: Siege of Multan; Battle of Gujrat; Indian Mutiny: Battle of Badli-ki-Serai; Siege of Delhi (WIA); Siege of Lucknow; Second Opium War: Battle of Taku Forts; Capture of Peking
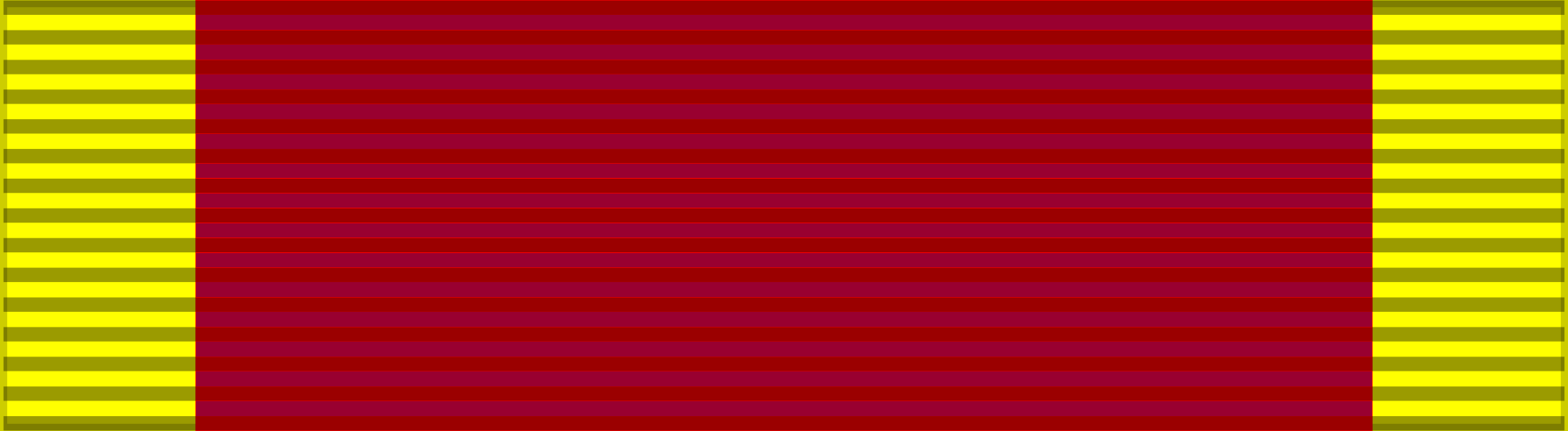
- Awards: Companion of the Order of the Bath Punjab Medal Indian Mutiny Medal Second China War Medal

Major-General William Wilberforce Harris Greathed CB (21 December 1826 – 29 December 1878) was a British senior officer in the Bengal Engineers.

He was born in Paris, the youngest of five sons of Edward Greathed (née Harris) and Mary Elizabeth Glyn of Uddens House, Wimborne, Dorset. One of his brothers was General Sir Edward Harris Greathed. Another brother, Hervey Harris Greathed, served with the Bengal Civil Service and died of cholera during the Siege of Delhi, while another, George Harris Greathed, was killed in action serving with the Naval Brigade at the Siege of Sevastopol.

He entered the Addiscombe military college of the East India Company in February 1843, and received a commission on 9 December 1844.

In 1846, he went to India, and was attached to the Bengal Sappers and Miners at Meerut. The following year he was appointed to the irrigation department of the North-west Provinces, but on the outbreak of the Second Sikh War in 1848, he was sent to join the field force at the Siege of Multan. He was the first officer through the breach in the final assault. He was also present at the Battle of Gujrat on 21 February 1849.

After two years leave in England he was appointed executive engineer in the public works department at Barrackpore and in 1855 was sent to Allahabad as government consulting engineer in connection with the extension of the East India Railway to the upper provinces.

In 1857, when mutiny broke out in Meerut and Delhi was seized, he was summoned to Agra by Lieutenant-Governor Colvin and ordered to carry despatches to the general at Meerut, which he succeeded in doing. Two months later he was asked to repeat the feat, reached Meerut and joined Sir Henry Barnard beyond the Jumna river, later taking a major part in the Battle of Badli-ki-Serai on 8 June 1857. In July he was severely wounded in a sortie from Delhi commanded by his brother Edward. After recovering from his wounds he joined a column as the field engineer under Colonel Seaton and took part in the engagements of Gungeree, Pattialee, and Mynpoory. He was then directing engineer of the attack on Lucknow under Colonel Robert Napier (afterwards first Lord Napier of Magdala). On the capture of Lucknow, he returned to his railway duties and was rewarded for his services in the mutiny by a brevet majority and the award of CB in the 1860 Birthday Honours.

In 1860 he accompanied Sir Robert Napier to China as an aide-de-camp and was present at the battle of Senho, at the capture of the Taku forts by the Hai River, and in the campaign to capture Peking, after which he was sent home with despatches. On arrival in England, he was promoted brevet lieutenant-colonel for his service in China and spent the next four years as assistant military secretary at the Horse Guards.

In 1867 he was back in India as head of the irrigation department in the North-west Provinces. In 1872, when at home on leave, he read a paper before the Institute of Civil Engineers on The Irrigation Works of the North-West Provinces, for which he received a Telford Medal. On his return to India, he completed his irrigation projects which included the Agra Canal from the Jumna and the Lower Ganges canal.

By 1875 he was ill and left India for good in July 1876. He was an invalid until he died on 29 December 1878, during which time he was promoted Major-general. After his death, he was buried at Hampreston, Wiltshire. He had married Alice Clive, daughter of Reverend Archer Clive and Caroline Meysey-Wigley and had 3 sons and 2 daughters.
