= Edward Stevenson (Orange Order) =

Northern Irish farmer

Edward Stevenson (born April 1955) is the former Grand Master of the Orange Order.

Stevenson is of British identity and Pro-Union. He was Grand Master of the Orange Order from his election in January 2011 until December 2025.

== Personal life ==
Stevenson is from Ardstraw, County Tyrone, Northern Ireland. He is married and has three children with his wife.

== Orange Order ==
Stevenson joined the Orange Order in 1974. He rose to be County Grand Master of Tyrone and Deputy Grand Master of the Order. In January 2011, he was elected Grand Master of the Grand Orange Lodge of Ireland.
