= Alfred Knox =

British Army general and politician (1870–1964)

Major-General Sir Alfred Knox CB
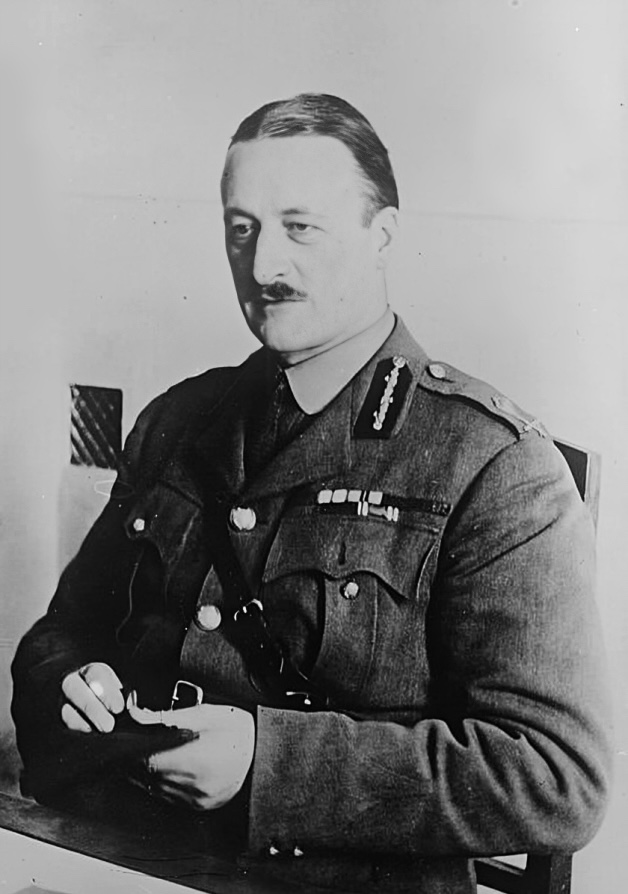
- General Alfred Knox in 1918
- Born: Alfred William Fortescue Knox; 30 October 1870; Newcastle, County Down, Ireland
- Died: 9 March 1964 (aged 93); Windsor, Berkshire, England
- Military career
- Allegiance: United Kingdom
- Branch: British Army; British Indian Army
- Service years: 1891–1920
- Rank: Major-General
- Units: Royal Ulster Rifles; 5th Punjab Infantry
- Conflicts: First World War; Russian Civil War
- Awards: Mentioned in dispatches
- Other work: Member of Parliament

Major-General Sir Alfred William Fortescue Knox CB (30 October 1870 – 9 March 1964) was an Ulster-Scots career officer in the British Army and later a Conservative Party politician.

== Early life ==
Knox was born at Shimnah House in Newcastle, County Down, the son of Vesey Edmund Knox and Margaret Clarissa Garrett. Edmund Vesey Knox and Gen. Sir Harry Knox were his brothers. His great-grandfather was Hon. Vesey Knox, third son of Thomas Knox, 1st Viscount Northland of Dungannon, and brother of Thomas Knox, 1st Earl of Ranfurly (1754–1840); Maj.-Gen. Hon. John Knox (1758–1800), Governor of Jamaica; William Knox (1762–1831), Bishop of Derry; George Knox (1765–1827), MP for Dublin University; Charles Knox (1770–1825), Archdeacon of Armagh; and Edmund Knox (1772–1849), Bishop of Limerick.

He was educated at Saint Columba's College, Dublin.

== Career ==
Knox joined the British Army when he attended the Royal Military College, Sandhurst, from where he was commissioned a second lieutenant in the Royal Irish Rifles on 2 May 1891, and was promoted to lieutenant on 18 November 1893. He was posted to British India where he joined the 5th Punjab Infantry, became a double company commander, and was promoted to captain on 10 July 1901. He was adjutant to the Southern Waziristan Militia, and as such took part in operations in Waziristan under Major-General Charles Egerton in summer 1902, for which he was mentioned in despatches.

In 1911, Knox was appointed the British Military Attaché in then Russian Empire. A fluent speaker of Russian, he became a liaison officer to the Imperial Russian Army during the First World War. During the 1917 Bolshevik coup in Russia he observed the Bolsheviks' taking of the Winter Palace on 7 November (25 October Old Style) 1917.

He wrote:

The garrison of the Winter Palace originally consisted of about 2,000 all told, including detachments from junker and ensign schools, three squadrons of Cossacks, a company of volunteers and a company from the Women's Battalion. It had six guns and one armoured car, the crew of which, however, declared that it had only come "to guard the art treasures of the Palace and was otherwise neutral"!

The garrison had dwindled owing to desertions, for there were no provisions and it had been practically starved for two days. There was no strong man to take command and to enforce discipline. No one had any stomach for fighting; and some of the ensigns even borrowed great coats of soldier pattern from the women to enable them to escape unobserved.

The greater part of the junkers of the Mikhail Artillery School returned to their school, taking with them four out of their six guns. Then the Cossacks left, declaring themselves opposed to bloodshed! At 10 p.m. a large part of the ensigns left, leaving few defenders except the ensigns of the Engineering School and the company of women.

During the Russian Civil War, he was the head of the British Mission (Britmis) and notional Chef d'Arrière of the White Army in Siberia under Admiral Kolchak. He barely intervened in the combat operations, as Kolchak was unwilling to listen to his advice and to accept demands about a Russian Constituent Assembly after the war.

R. H. Bruce Lockhart praised him highly. "Up to the revolution no man took a saner view of the military situation on the Eastern front and no foreign observer supplied his Government with more reliable information."

In 1921 Knox, who retired from the army in July 1920 with the honorary rank of major general, published his memoirs, With the Russian Army: 1914–1917. In this book he also tells the story of heroine Elsa Brändström.

== Political career ==
At the 1924 general election, Knox was elected as a Conservative Member of Parliament (MP) for Wycombe, defeating the sitting Liberal MP Lady Terrington. He held his seat during the 1929 general election and through subsequent general elections, serving in the House of Commons until the 1945 general election. In 1934, Knox argued against Indian self-government by stating "India, diverse in races and creed and united only by Britain, is not ready for democracy." His parliamentary questions mainly concerned the Stalinist Soviet Union and the threat of Hitler as well as the rearmament of Britain during the interwar period. Knox remained a strong opponent of Communism throughout his career and following the 1939 Soviet invasion of Finland during World War II, he campaigned to give military support to the Finns.

== Personal life ==
In 1915, he married Edith Mary Boyle (died 1959), the widow of Richard Boyle, daughter of Col. Frederick John Colin Halkett, and granddaughter of Sir Colin Halkett.

After a short illness, he died on 9 March 1964 at King Edward VII Hospital, Windsor.

== In fiction ==
Knox is depicted in the book August 1914 by Aleksandr Solzhenitsyn, as a somewhat troublesome attache as General Samsonov attempts to lead his army through East Prussia.

Parliament of the United Kingdom
Preceded by Lady Terrington	Member of Parliament for Wycombe; 1924–1945	Succeeded by John Haire
