= Thomas George Knox =

Ulster-Scots soldier and diplomat

Sir Thomas Knox
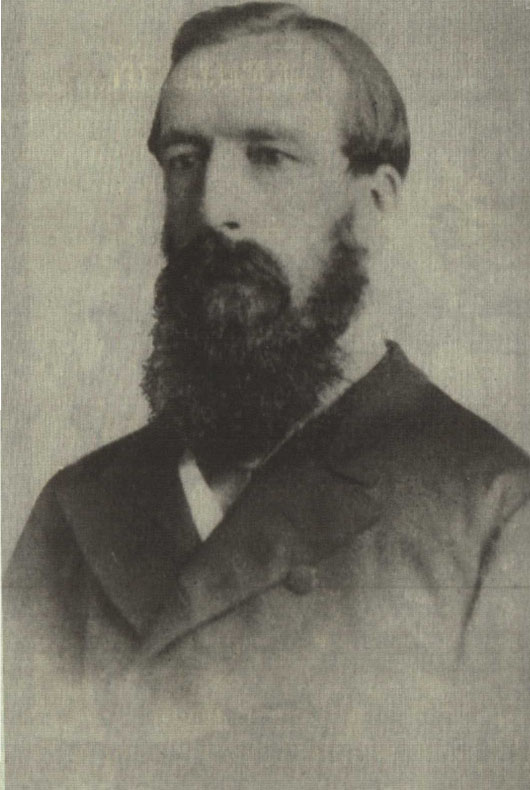
- Born: Thomas George Knox; January 1824; Dungannon, County Londonderry, Ireland
- Died: 29 July 1887 (aged 63); Eaux Chaudes, Pyrenees, France
- Occupation: diplomat
- Spouse: Prang (m. 1854)
- Children: 3
- Writing career
- Language: English

Sir Thomas George Knox KCMG (11 January 1824 – 29 July 1887) was an Ulster-Scots soldier and a diplomat, serving as consul-general in Siam from 1868 to 1879.

== Early life ==
Knox was the second but eldest surviving son of Rev. James Spencer Knox, D.D. (1789–1862), rector of Maghera, County Londonderry, and his wife, Clara, daughter of the Right Hon. John Beresford. He was born in 1824 at Northland House, Dungannon, the seat of his great-grandfather Thomas Knox, 1st Viscount Northland (1729–1818). His uncles and was grandson of William Knox, bishop of Derry (1762–1831). His uncles were Thomas Knox, 1st Earl of Ranfurly (1754–1840); George Knox (1765–1827), MP for Dublin University; Charles Knox (1770–1825), Archdeacon of Armagh; and Edmund Knox (1772–1849), Bishop of Limerick.

== Career ==
On 17 April 1840, Knox was appointed ensign of the 65th Foot and, on 7 October 1842, was promoted to a lieutenancy in the 98th Foot.

After serving with the 98th Foot in China and India, Knox sold out in December 1848. He subsequently served with the Siamese Army from 1851 to 1857. Siam was under Mongkut, who was opening the country to the West, and Knox functioned as a military adviser. He began by training the troops of Pinklao, who ranked as Front Palace.

Knox was appointed interpreter at the British Consulate in Bangkok on 7 July 1857. He was acting consul there from December 1859 to May 1860, and was appointed consul on 30 November 1864. He was promoted to be consul-general in Siam on 18 July 1868, and agent and consul-general in Siam on 8 February 1875.

In 1868, Chulalongkorn succeeded Mongkut, and Knox became an influential court figure. In the Front Palace crisis of 1874–5, Knox was absent at the outset in the United Kingdom, when supporters of Wichaichan challenged Chulalongkorn, and consular staff did what they could to calm matters. In 1879, however, Knox lost status. A tense factional situation was precipitated into a power struggle when in March of that year Fanny Knox, his elder daughter, married a member of the royal family without the required permission. Knox found his position undermined when the British government refused to back him with military force.

Knox retired on a pension on 26 November 1879, and was made KCMG in April 1880. He died at Eaux Chaudes in the French Pyrenees, on 29 July 1887.

== Family ==
In 1854, Knox married a Siamese woman of high position, Prang, daughter of Phya (Count) Somkok and Mâe Yen of Somkok and Bangkok. Their younger daughter Caroline married Louis T. Leonowens.
