= Harry Knox =

General Sir Harry Knox KCB DSO
- Born: Harry Hugh Sidney Knox; 5 November 1873; Newcastle, County Down, Ireland
- Died: 10 June 1971 (aged 97); Christchurch, Hampshire, England
- Military career
- Allegiance: United Kingdom
- Branch: British Army
- Service years: 1893–1937
- Rank: General
- Commands: 3rd Division; 3rd Brigade
- Conflicts: North-West Frontier; Tirah Campaign; First World War
- Awards: Knight Commander of the Order of the Bath; Distinguished Service Order; Mentioned in Despatches; Officer of the Legion of Honour (France); Officer of the Order of the Crown (Belgium)

General Sir Harry Hugh Sidney Knox, KCB, DSO (5 November 1873 – 10 June 1971) was a senior British Army officer who served as Adjutant-General to the Forces from 1935 to 1937.

== Early life and education ==
Knox was born in Newcastle, County Down, the fourth son of Vesey Edmund Knox and Margaret Clarissa Garrett. Edmund Vesey Knox and Maj.-Gen. Sir Alfred Knox were his elder brothers. His great-grandfather was Hon. Vesey Knox, third son of Thomas Knox, 1st Viscount Northland of Dungannon, and brother of Thomas Knox, 1st Earl of Ranfurly (1754–1840); William Knox (1762–1831), Bishop of Derry; George Knox (1765–1827), MP for Dublin University; Charles Knox (1770–1825), Archdeacon of Armagh; and Edmund Knox (1772–1849), Bishop of Limerick.

He was educated at Saint Columba's College, Dublin.

== Military career ==
Knox was commissioned into the Northamptonshire Regiment on 9 September 1893, aged 17, and promoted to the rank of lieutenant on 26 August 1895. He served on the North-West Frontier between 1897 and 1898, where he took part in the Tirah Campaign, including operations on the Samana Range, the capture of the Sampagha Pass and Arhanga Pass (October 1897), and operations in the Bara valley (December 1897). In January 1900, he was seconded for service under the Foreign Office, and attached to the Uganda Rifles. He returned to regular service with his regiment in March 1902, and was promoted to the rank of captain on 1 April 1902. The following month he was appointed adjutant of the 1st Battalion.

Knox fought in the First World War, and was involved in the British Expeditionary Force. He was made an Officer of the Legion of Honour in February 1916. He was awarded the Distinguished Service Order (DSO) in 1917 and appointed a Companion of the Order of the Bath in 1919. For his war service he was also made an Officer of the Belgian Order of the Crown; he received permission to wear his decoration from 7 February 1921.

After the war Knox, promoted to substantive lieutenant colonel in June 1919, became a colonel at the Staff College, Camberley. He then became commander of the 3rd Brigade in 1923. He was appointed director of military training at the War Office in 1926, was promoted to major general in May, and then became general officer commanding of the 3rd Division in 1930. On 20 September 1933 he was appointed lieutenant of the Tower of London.

In the 1935 New Year Honours, Knox was appointed a Knight Commander of the Order of the Bath. He served as Adjutant-General to the Forces between March 1935 and 1937.

In retirement Knox was governor of the Royal Hospital Chelsea from 1938 to 1943.

== Family ==
In 1904, Knox married Grace Una Storrs, daughter of Rev. Robert Augustine Storrs. They had one daughter, Una Sheila Colleen, who in 1939 married Lt.-Gen. Sir Archibald Nye.

Military offices
Preceded by John Burnett-Stuart	GOC 3rd Division; 1930–1932	Succeeded by Walter Pitt-Taylor
Preceded by Sir Cecil Romer	Adjutant General; 1935–1937	Succeeded by Sir Clive Liddell
Honorary titles
Preceded by Sir Walter Braithwaite	Governor, Royal Hospital Chelsea; 1938–1943	Succeeded by Sir Clive Liddell
