= Blayney Townley-Balfour =

Blayney Townley-Balfour or Blayney Townley Balfour may refer to:

- Blayney Townley-Balfour (Carlingford MP) (1705–1788), Irish politician
- Blayney Townley-Balfour (Belturbet MP) (1769–1856), Irish politician, grandson of the preceding
- Blayney Townley-Balfour (governor) (1799–1882), son of the preceding, Governor of the Bahamas 1833–1835
