= General Knox (disambiguation) =

Henry Knox (1750–1806) was a Continental Army general in the American Revolutionary War. General Knox may also refer to:

- Alfred Knox (1870–1964), British Army major general
- Charles Edmond Knox (1846–1938), British Army lieutenant general
- Harry Knox (1873–1971), British Army general
- Jean Knox (1908–1993), Auxiliary Territorial Service major general
- William Knox (British Army officer) (1847–1916), British Army lieutenant general

== See also ==
- Attorney General Knox (disambiguation)
