= Robert Knox (bishop) =

Irish bishop

The Right Reverend Robert Knox D.D.
- Archbishop of Armagh; Primate of All Ireland
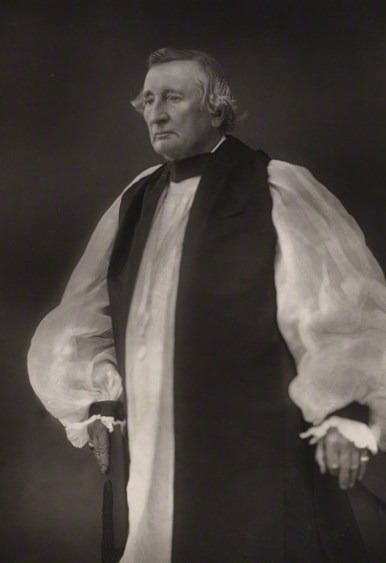
- Church: Church of Ireland
- See: Armagh
- Elected: 11 May 1886
- In office: 1886–1893
- Predecessor: Marcus Beresford
- Successor: Robert Gregg
- Previous post: Bishop of Down, Connor and Dromore (1849–1886)

Orders
- Ordination: 1832 by George Beresford
- Consecration: 1 May 1849 by John Beresford

Personal details
- Born: 25 September 1808 Dungannon, County Tyrone, Ireland
- Died: 23 October 1893 (aged 85) Armagh, County Armagh, Ireland
- Buried: Holywood, County Down, Ireland
- Denomination: Anglican
- Parents: Charles Knox & Hannah Bent
- Spouse: Catherine Delia
- Children: 5
- Education: Trinity College, Dublin

Robert Bent Knox (25 September 1808 – 23 October 1893) was the Church of Ireland Bishop of Down, Connor and Dromore from 1849 to 1886, and then Archbishop of Armagh and Primate of All Ireland from 1886 until his death.

== Early life ==
Born in 1808 at Dungannon Park, County Tyrone, the country seat of his grandfather, Thomas Knox, 1st Viscount Northland (died 1818), Knox was the second son of the Hon. Charles Knox (died 1825), Archdeacon of Armagh, and his wife, Hannah, the daughter of Robert Bent MP. His uncles were the bishops William Knox and Edmund Knox, his niece was the writer Kathleen Knox.

Educated at Trinity College, Dublin, he took the degree of Bachelor of Arts at the age of twenty-one, then graduated with an MA in 1834. He was also awarded the degree of Doctor of Laws by Cambridge in 1888.

== Career ==
In 1832, Knox was ordained deacon and priest by Bishop Beresford of Kilmore. On 7 May 1834 he became chancellor of Ardfert. On 16 October 1841 he was collated as prebendary of St Munchin's, Limerick, by his uncle Edmund Knox, Bishop of Limerick, who also made him his domestic chaplain.

In 1849 he became a Doctor of Divinity and was appointed Bishop of Down, Connor and Dromore. In 1886, he was created Archbishop of Armagh. He was succeeded in Down, Connor and Dromore by William Reeves.

Knox was nominated to the see of Down, Connor, and Dromore by George Villiers, 4th Earl of Clarendon, at the time Lord Lieutenant of Ireland. Samuel Wilberforce later reported in his diary for 26 August 1861, some gossip about this appointment; James Henthorn Todd had said of Knox that he was "…very foolish, without learning, piety, judgment, conduct, sense, appointed by a job, that his uncle should resign Limerick", while Anthony La Touche Kirwan (Dean of Limerick, died 1868), said that Knox "…used, when made to preach by his uncle, to get me to write his sermon, and could not deliver it".

Nevertheless, Knox was the author of various ecclesiastical and secular works.

Knox made no secret of his view that disestablishment in Ireland was inevitable. As Bishop of Down, Connor, and Dromore, he hoped to build a new cathedral in Belfast, but abandoned this plan in favour of another, to increase the number of churches of the united diocese. He founded the Belfast Church Extension Society in 1862 and through it achieved forty-eight new or enlarged churches. He organized diocesan conferences and founded a Diocesan Board of Missions. In 1867, in the House of Lords, he proposed a reduction of the hierarchy of the Church of Ireland to just one archbishop and five bishops. In person, he was quiet and restrained, pragmatic and frank, and an able administrator and an effective speaker.

Following the death of Marcus Gervais Beresford, Archbishop of Armagh, on 26 December 1885, Knox was chosen as his successor. As president of the General Synod of the Irish church he was seen as fair and moderate. He died at the archbishop's palace, Armagh, on 23 October 1893, and was buried on 27 October in the old ruined church at Holywood. There is also a memorial to him on the north aisle of St Patrick's Cathedral, Armagh.

== Family ==
On 5 October 1842, Knox married Catherine Delia FitzGibbon, daughter of Thomas Gibbon FitzGibbon of Ballyseeda, County Limerick. They had three sons, including Charles Edmond Knox, who became a lieutenant-general of the British Army, and two daughters.

== Selected publications ==
- Ecclesiastical Index [of Ireland] (1839)
- Fruits of the revival, in Steane's Ulster Revival (1859)

== Sources ==
- Gordon, Alexander (1901). "Knox, Robert Bent" . In Lee, Sidney (ed.). Dictionary of National Biography (1st supplement). London: Smith, Elder & Co.

Church of Ireland titles
Preceded by Richard Mant	Bishop of Down, Connor and Dromore; 1849–1886	Succeeded by William Reeves
Preceded by Marcus Beresford	Archbishop of Armagh; 1886–1893	Succeeded by Robert Gregg
