= Janssen baronets =

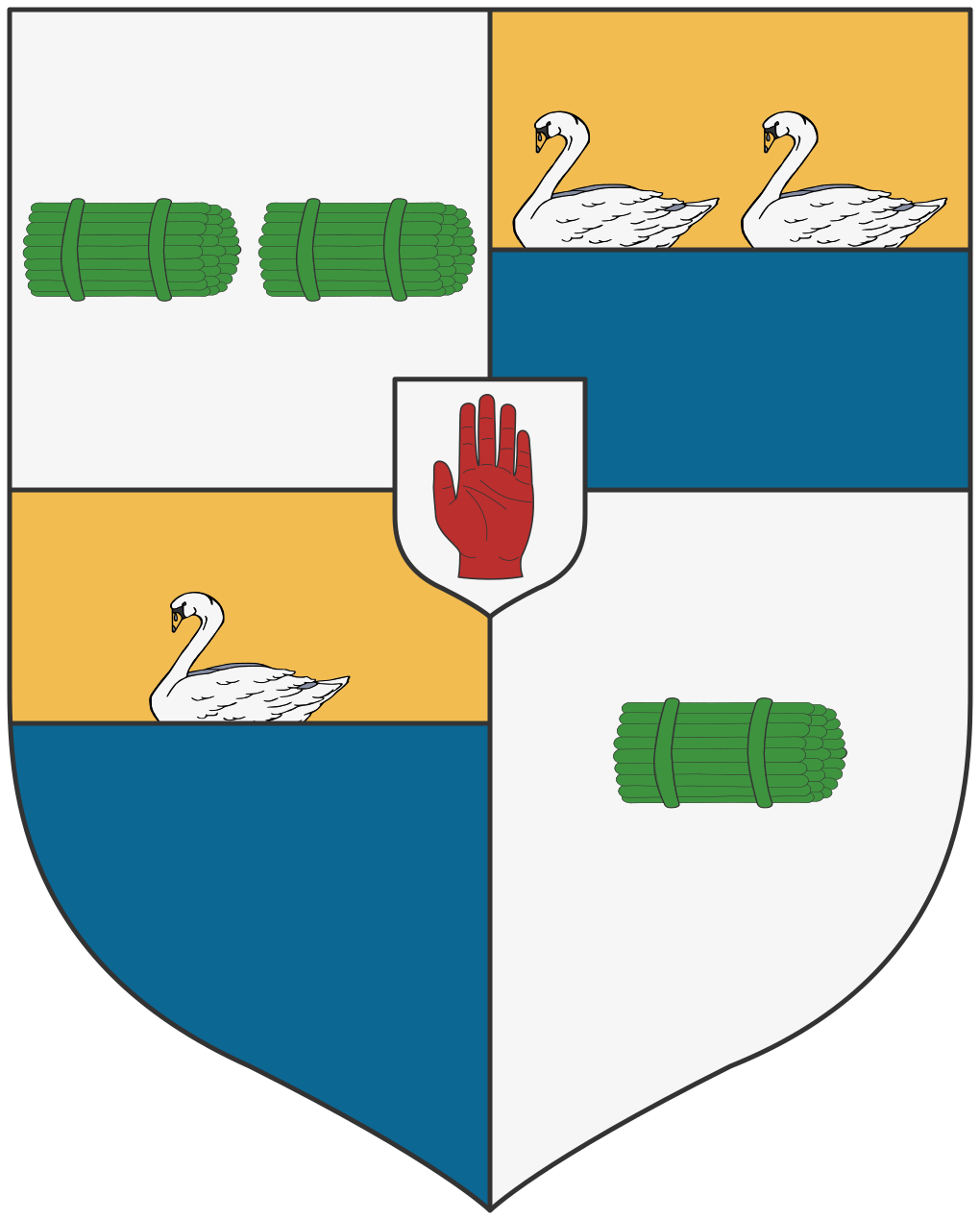
The coat of arms of Janssen of Wimbledon, Baronets.

The Janssen baronetcy, of Wimbledon in the County of Surrey, was a title in the Baronetage of Great Britain. It was created on 11 March 1715 for the Dutch-born financier Theodore Janssen, who later represented Yarmouth in the House of Commons.

The 2nd Baronet sat as Member of Parliament for Dorchester; while the 4th Baronet was Member of Parliament for the City of London and a Lord Mayor of London. The title became extinct on the latter's death in 1777.

== Janssen baronets, of Wimbledon (1715) ==
- Sir Theodore Janssen, 1st Baronet (c. 1658–1748)
- Sir Abraham Janssen, 2nd Baronet (c.1699–1765)
- Sir Henry Janssen, 3rd Baronet (died 1766)
- Sir Stephen Theodore Janssen, 4th Baronet (died 1777)

== Extended family ==
The 4th Baronet's only daughter Henrietta Janssen (born 1752, died 29 July 1840 Twickenham, aged 87) married Lorenzo Moore, MP for Dungannon in Ireland.

Baronetage of Great Britain
Preceded by Carew baronets	Janssen baronets of Wimbledon; 15 March 1715	Succeeded by Kneller baronets
