= Charles Lindsay =

Charles Lindsay may refer to:

- Charles Lindsay (British politician), British soldier, courtier and Conservative politician
- Charles Lindsay (artist) (born 1961), American photographer and artist
- Charles Lindsay (bishop) (1760–1846), Church of Ireland bishop
- Charles Lindsay (Australian politician) (1812–1884), Scottish pastoralist and South Australia politician
- Charles Lindsay (priest) (1790–1855), Anglican priest in Ireland
- Sir Charles William Lindsay (1856–1939), Canadian businessman and philanthropist
- Charles Lindsay of the Lindsay baronets

== See also ==
- Charles Lindsey (disambiguation)
