= James Verner =

James Verner may refer to:

- James Verner (Irish parliamentarian) (1746–1822)
- James Verner, suspect in 1946 Georgia lynching
