= Edmund Knox =

Edmund Knox may refer to:

- Edmund Knox (bishop of Manchester) (1847–1937), English bishop
- Edmund Knox (bishop of Limerick, Ardfert and Aghadoe) (1772–1849), absentee Irish bishop
- Edmund Vesey Knox (1865–1921), Irish nationalist politician
- E. V. Knox (Edmund George Valpy Knox, 1881–1971), British journalist known under the pen-name 'Evoe'
