= George Knox (MP, died 1827) =

Anglo-Irish politician (1765–1827)

The Honourable George Knox

Member of Parliament for Dungannon
- In office 1790-1789; 1802-1803; 1806-1807 Serving with Hon. John Knox (1790–1794); James Verner (1794–1798)

Member of Parliament for Dublin University
- In office 1798-1801; 1801-1807 Serving with Arthur Browne (1798-1801)

Personal details
- Born: 14 January 1765
- Died: 13 June 1827 (aged 62)
- Party: Tory
- Parent: Thomas Knox (father)
- Relatives: Thomas Knox (brother); William Knox (brother); Charles Knox (brother); Edmund Knox (brother)

George Knox PC, FRS (14 January 1765 – 13 June 1827), was an Irish Tory politician.

== Biography ==
Knox was the fifth son of Thomas Knox, 1st Viscount Northland. In 1790, Knox entered the Irish House of Commons for Dungannon. Subsequently, he sat for Dublin University until the Act of Union in 1801. Thereafter Knox sat as a Member of Parliament (MP) in the United Kingdom Parliament and represented Dublin University from 1801 to 1807. He was also elected for Dungannon in 1801 and 1806, but chose to represent Dublin University both times.

Parliament of Ireland
Preceded by Lorenzo Moore; Hon. Thomas Knox	Member of Parliament for Dungannon; 1790–1798; With: Hon. John Knox 1790–1794; James Verner 1794–1798	Succeeded by James Verner; Hon. Charles Knox
Preceded by Hon. Francis Hely-Hutchinson; Arthur Browne	Member of Parliament for Dublin University; 1798–1801; With: Arthur Browne	Parliament of Ireland abolished
Parliament of the United Kingdom
New constituency	Member of Parliament for Dublin University; 1801–1807	Succeeded by John Leslie Foster
Preceded by Sir Charles Hamilton	Member of Parliament for Dungannon; 1802–1803	Succeeded by Sir Charles Hamilton
Preceded by Sir Charles Hamilton	Member of Parliament for Dungannon; 1806–1807	Succeeded by Viscount Hamilton
