= Bishop of Killaloe and Kilfenora =

The Bishop of Killaloe and Kilfenora was the Ordinary of the Church of Ireland diocese of Killaloe and Kilfenora in the Province of Cashel; comprising all of County Clare and the northern part of County Tipperary, Ireland.

The Episcopal see was a union of the bishoprics of Killaloe and Kilfenora which were united in 1752. Under the Church Temporalities (Ireland) Act 1833 (3 & 4 Will. 4. c. 37), Killaloe & Kilfenora combined with Clonfert & Kilmacaduagh to form the united bishopric of Killaloe and Clonfert in 1834.

== List of Bishops of Killaloe and Kilfenora ==
Bishops of Killaloe and Kilfenora
| From | Until | Incumbent | Notes |
|---|---|---|---|
| 1752 | 1771 | Nicholas Synge, D.D. | hitherto separate Bishop of Killaloe; died 19 January 1771; his father was Edward Synge, Archbishop of Tuam and his brother was Edward Synge, Bishop of Elphin |
| 1771 | 1779 | Robert Fowler, D.D. | nominated 13 June and consecrated 28 July 1771; translated to Dublin 8 January 1779 |
| 1779 | 1780 | George Chinnery, LL.D. | previously Dean of Cork (1663–79); nominated 21 December 1778; consecrated 7 March 1779; translated to Cloyne 15 February 1780 |
| 1780 | 1794 | Thomas Barnard, D.D. | son of William Barnard, Bishop of Derry (1747–68); nominated 29 January 1780; consecrated 20 February 1780; translated to Limerick, Ardfert and Aghadoe 12 September 1794 |
| 1794 | 1803 | Hon. William Knox, D.D. | son of Thomas Knox, 1st Viscount Northland; chaplain to the House of Commons; nominated 14 August 1794; consecrated 21 September 1794; translated to Derry 9 September 1803; his brother Edmund Knox became Bishop of Killaloe and Kilfenora in 1831 |
| 1803 | 1804 | Hon. Charles Dalrymple Lyndsay, D.D. | third son of the 5th Earl of Balcarres; nominated 27 August 1803; consecrated 13 Nov 1803; translated to Kildare 14 May 1804 |
| 1804 | | Nathaniel Alexander, D.D. | nephew of the 1st Earl of Caledon; translated from Clonfert and Kilmacduagh; nominated 15 May 1804; letters patent 22 May 1804; translated to Down and Connor 21 November 1804 |
| 1804 | 1820 | Lord Robert Ponsonby Tottenham Loftus | son of the 1st Marquess of Ely; formerly Precentor of Cashel (1798–1804); nominated 3 November and consecrated 16 December 1804; translated to Ferns and Leighlin 5 May 1820 |
| 1820 | 1823 | Richard Mant, D.D. (Oxford) | previously domestic chaplain to the Archbishop of Canterbury; nominated 10 April 1820; consecrated 7 May 1820; translated to Down and Connor 23 March 1823 |
| 1823 | 1828 | Alexander Arbuthnot, D.D. | previously Dean of Cloyne (1816–1823); nominated 13 March 1823; consecrated 11 May 1823; died at Killaloe 9 January 1828, aged 59 |
| 1828 | 1831 | Hon. Richard Ponsonby, D.D. | third son of the 1st Baron Ponsonby; previously Dean of St. Patrick's Cathedral, Dublin (1817–28); nominated 22 February and consecrated 16 March 1828; translated to Derry 21 September 1831 |
| 1831 | 1834 | Hon. Edmund Knox, D.D. | seventh son of Thomas, 1st Viscount Northland, and brother of William, Bishop of Killaloe and Kilfenora (1794–1803); previously Dean of Down (1817–31); nominated 23 September 1831; consecrated 9 October 1831; translated to Limerick 29 January 1834 |
In 1834, the see became part of the united bishopric of Killaloe and Clonfert.
