= Blayney Townley =

Blayney Townley may refer to:

- Blayney Townley (Dunleer MP), MP (1692–1715) for Dunleer (Parliament of Ireland constituency)
- Blayney Townley-Balfour (Carlingford MP) (1705–1788), born Blayney Townley
