= Thomas Knox, 1st Earl of Ranfurly =

Irish politician (1754–1840)

The Right Honourable The Earl of Ranfurly

Member of Parliament for County Tyrone
- In office 1806–1812 Serving with James Stewart
- Preceded by: James Stewart; Sir John Stewart, Bt
- Succeeded by: Sir John Stewart, Bt; Hon. Thomas Knox

Member of Parliament for County Tyrone
- In office 1790–1797 Serving with James Stewart
- Preceded by: James Stewart; Nathaniel Montgomery
- Succeeded by: James Stewart; Viscount Corry

Member of Parliament for Dungannon
- In office 1783–1790 Serving with Edmund Sexton Pery, Lorenzo Moore
- Preceded by: Charles O'Hara; William Eden
- Succeeded by: Hon. John Knox; Hon. George Knox

Member of Parliament for Carlingford
- In office 1776–1783 Serving with Theophilus Blakeney
- Preceded by: Blayney Townley-Balfour; Robert Ross
- Succeeded by: Sir John Blaquiere; Thomas Coghlan

Personal details
- Born: Thomas Knox; 5 August 1754
- Died: 26 April 1840 (aged 85)
- Spouse: Diana Jane Pery (m. 1785; died 1839)
- Relations: William Knox (brother); Edmund Knox (brother); George Knox (brother); John Vesey, 1st Baron Knapton (grandfather)
- Parent(s): Thomas Knox, 1st Viscount Northland; Hon. Anne Vesey

Thomas Knox, 1st Earl of Ranfurly (5 August 1754 – 26 April 1840), styled The Honourable Thomas Knox between 1781 and 1818 and known as The Viscount Northland between 1818 and 1831, was an Irish peer and politician.

== Early life ==
Ranfurly was the eldest son of Thomas Knox, 1st Viscount Northland, and the Hon. Anne Vesey, daughter of John Vesey, 1st Baron Knapton. His brothers included bishops William Knox and Edmund Knox, George Knox MP, and Archdeacon Charles Knox. His father had been elevated to the Peerage of Ireland as Baron Welles, of Dungannon in the County of Tyrone, in 1781 and further ennobled as Viscount Northland, of Dungannon in the County of Tyrone, in 1791.

His paternal grandparents were Hester (née Echlin) Knox and Thomas Knox, MP for Dungannon who was Deputy-Governor of County Tyrone. His maternal grandparents were John Vesey, 1st Baron Knapton and the former Elizabeth Brownlow (daughter of William Brownlow).

== Career ==
Ranfurly was elected a member of the Irish House of Commons for Carlingford in 1776, a seat he held until 1783, and then represented Dungannon between 1783 and 1790 and County Tyrone between 1790 and 1798. He was also a member of the British House of Commons for County Tyrone from 1806 to 1812.

On 18 May 1793 he was commissioned as Lieutenant-Colonel and second-in-command of the newly raised Royal Tyrone Militia. He commanded the regiment on garrison duty for a year, resigning in 1794.

In 1818 he succeeded his father in the viscountcy of Northland, but, as this was an Irish peerage it did not entitle him to a seat in the House of Lords. However, in 1826 he was created Baron Ranfurly, of Ramphorlie in the County of Renfrew, in the Peerage of the United Kingdom, which entitled him and his successors to a seat in the upper chamber of parliament. In 1831 he was further honoured when he was made Earl of Ranfurly in the Peerage of Ireland.

== Personal life ==
Lord Ranfurly married his cousin the Hon. Diana Jane Pery, daughter of Edmund Pery, 1st Viscount Pery and Hon. Elizabeth Vesey, in 1785. Together, they were the parents of:

- Thomas Knox, 2nd Earl of Ranfurly (1786–1858), who married Mary Juliana Stuart, a daughter of William Stuart, Archbishop of Armagh, and the former Sophia Margaret Penn (the daughter of Thomas Penn, a son of William Penn, founder of Pennsylvania), in 1815.
- Hon. Edmund Knox (1787–1867), an Admiral in the Royal Navy who married Jane Sophia Hope-Vere, a daughter of William Hope-Vere (a grandson of the 1st Earl of Hopetoun) and sister to James Joseph Hope-Vere, in 1813.
- Hon. John Henry Knox (1788–1872), who married Lady Mabella Josephine Needham, daughter of Gen. Francis Needham, 1st Earl of Kilmorey, in 1822.
- Hon. John James Knox (1790–1856), who married Mary Louisa Taylor, a daughter of Edward Taylor, in 1824.

Lady Ranfurly died in November 1839. Lord Ranfurly only survived her by a few months and died in April 1840, aged 85. He was succeeded in his titles by his eldest son, Thomas.

Parliament of Ireland
Preceded by Blayney Townley-Balfour; Robert Ross	Member of Parliament for Carlingford; 1776–1783; With: Theophilus Blakeney	Succeeded by Sir John Blaquiere; Thomas Coghlan
Preceded by Charles O'Hara; William Eden	Member of Parliament for Dungannon; 1783–1790; With: Edmund Sexton Pery 1783; Lorenzo Moore 1783–1790	Succeeded by Hon. John Knox; Hon. George Knox
Preceded by James Stewart; Nathaniel Montgomery	Member of Parliament for County Tyrone; 1790–1797; With: James Stewart	Succeeded by James Stewart; Viscount Corry
Parliament of the United Kingdom
Preceded by James Stewart; Sir John Stewart, Bt	Member of Parliament for County Tyrone; 1806–1812; With: James Stewart	Succeeded by Sir John Stewart, Bt; Hon. Thomas Knox
Peerage of Ireland
New creation	Earl of Ranfurly; 1831–1840	Succeeded by Thomas Knox
Preceded by Thomas Knox	Viscount Northland; 1818–1840	Succeeded by Thomas Knox
Peerage of the United Kingdom
New creation	Baron Ranfurly; 1826–1840	Succeeded by Thomas Knox
