= Thomas Barnard =

Irish Anglican bishop (died 1806)

The Right Reverend Thomas Barnard S.T.B.
- Bishop of Limerick, Ardfert and Aghadoe
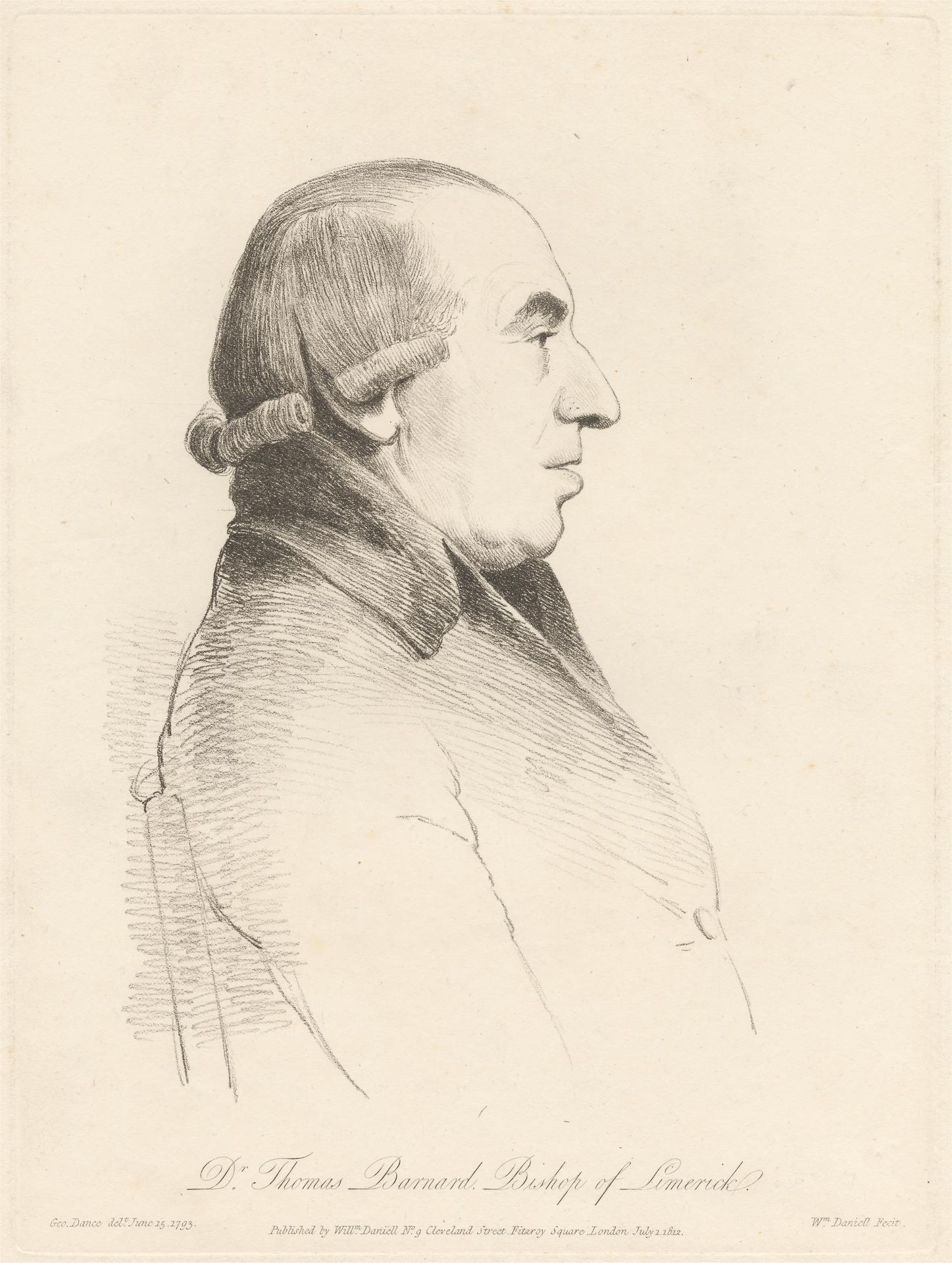
- Church: Church of Ireland
- Installed: 22 May 1794
- Term ended: 7 June 1806
- Predecessor: William Cecil Pery
- Successor: Charles Mongan Warburton
- Previous post: Bishop of Killaloe and Kilfenora

Orders
- Consecration: 20 February 1780 by Charles Agar

Personal details
- Born: 1726 or 1728
- Died: 7 June 1806 Wimbledon, Surrey, England
- Denomination: Church of England
- Parents: William Barnard
- Occupation: clergyman
- Education: Leeds grammar School and Westminster School; Corpus Christi College, Oxford

Thomas Barnard (c. 1726/28–1806) was an Anglican clergyman who served in the Church of Ireland as Bishop of Killaloe and Kilfenora (1780–1794) and Bishop of Limerick, Ardfert and Aghadoe (1794–1806).

Born in 1726 or 1728, he was the eldest son of Dr. William Barnard, Bishop of Raphoe (later of Derry). He was educated at Westminster School, where he was admitted a King's Scholar in 1741, but he almost certainly spent some time at Leeds Grammar School. Later he went to Corpus Christi College, Oxford, and was awarded with a Bachelor of Arts in 1756, Master of Arts in 1760 and Bachelor of Divinity in 1769.

He was successively Vicar of Maghera (1751–1760), Archdeacon of Derry (1760–1769), and Dean of Derry (1769–1780). He was nominated Bishop of Killaloe and Kilfenora by King George III on 29 January 1780 and consecrated bishop at the Chapel Royal in Dublin Castle on 20 February 1780. The principal consecrator was Charles Agar, Archbishop of Cashel, and the principal co-consecrators were William Newcome, Bishop of Waterford and Lismore and Isaac Mann, Bishop of Cork and Ross. Fourteen years later, he was translated to the bishopric of Limerick, Ardfert and Aghadoe; having been nominated to the see on 14 August 1794 and by letters patent on 12 September 1794.

He was a member of the Literary Club, and well known as the friend of Samuel Johnson, Oliver Goldsmith, Sir Joshua Reynolds, Edmund Burke, Bishop Thomas Percy, and other literary characters of his day. He married Anne Browne of County Carlow in 1758 and secondly Jane Ross-Lewin.

He died in his 80th year, at Wimbledon in Surrey, on 7 June 1806.

== Notes ==
Church of Ireland titles
Preceded by Philip Sydney Smythe	Dean of Derry; 1769–1780	Succeeded by William Cecil Pery
Preceded by George Chinnery	Bishop of Killaloe and Kilfenora; 1780–1794	Succeeded by William Knox
Preceded by William Cecil Pery	Bishop of Limerick, Ardfert and Aghadoe; 1794–1806	Succeeded by Charles Mongan Warburton
