= Drumcree Church =

Drumcree Parish Church
- The Church of the Ascension
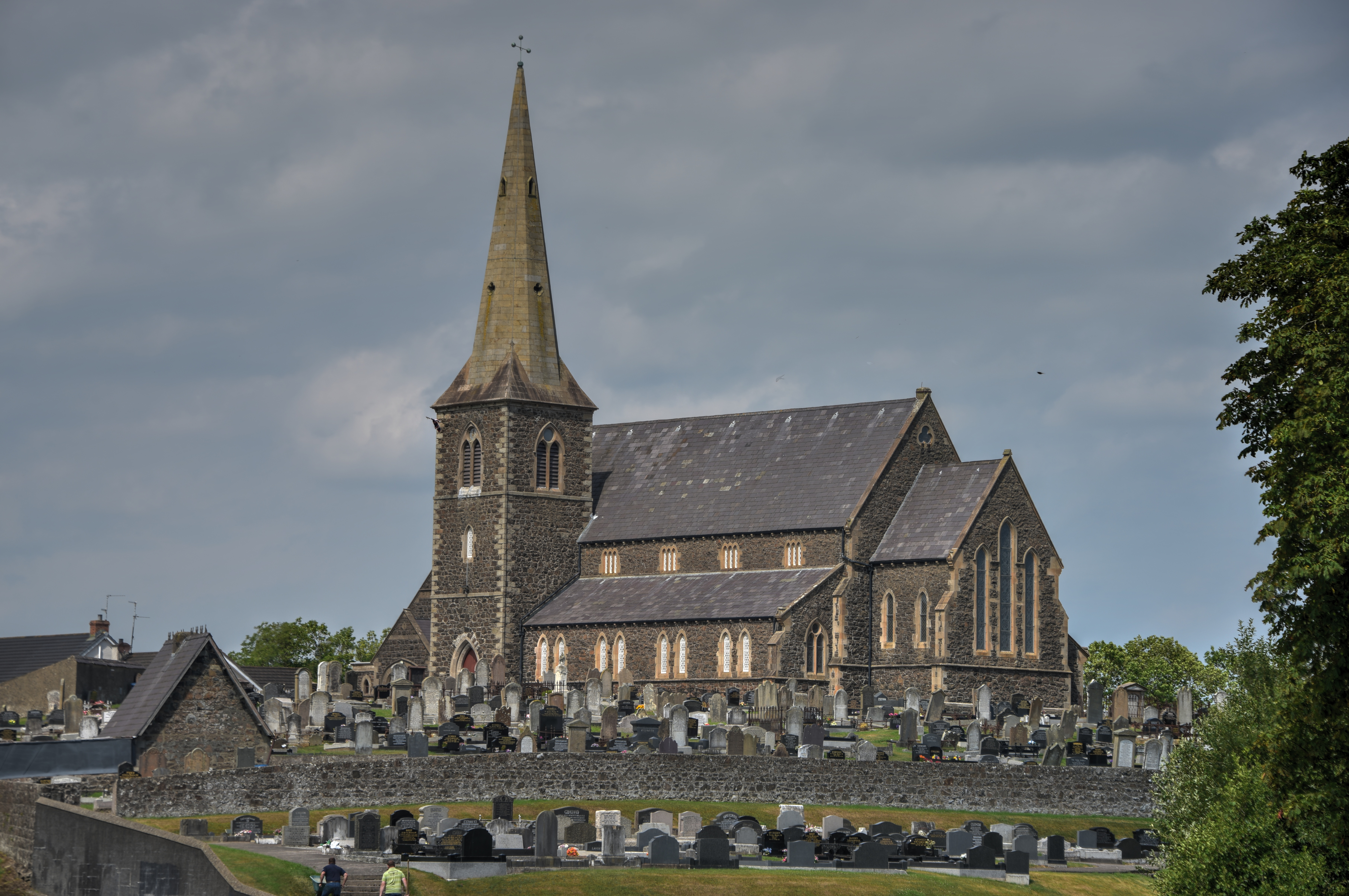
- Drumcree Parish Church
- Drumcree Parish Church
- 54°26′25.6″N 06°27′34.2″W
- Location: Drumcree Road, Portadown
- Country: Northern Ireland
- Denomination: Church of Ireland
- Website: www.drumcree.org

History
- Consecrated: 28 October 1856

Architecture
- Groundbreaking: 17 May 1855

Administration
- Parish: Drumcree

Clergy
- Rector: Rev Gary Galway
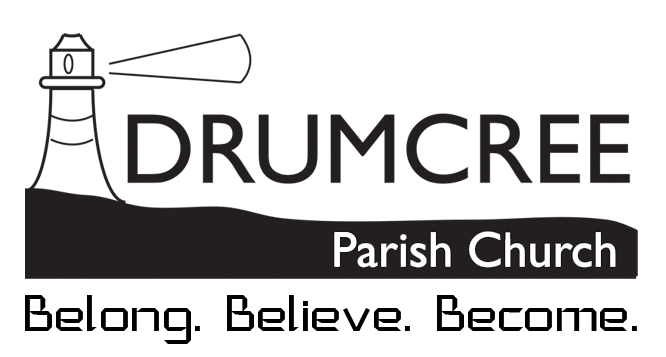

Drumcree Parish Church, officially The Church of the Ascension, is the Church of Ireland parish church of Drumcree in County Armagh, Northern Ireland. It stands on a hill in the townland of Drumcree, outside Portadown. It is a site of historic significance and is a listed building.

There has been a church on the site since the Middle Ages. The original church was Roman Catholic. The foundation stone of the present Anglican church was laid on Ascension Day in 1855, and the church was consecrated the following year. The current rector is the Reverend Gary Galway. The Church of Ireland parish of Drumcree has the same boundaries as the Catholic parish of Drumcree, represented by St John the Baptist Church.

From 1995 to 2000, the church drew international attention as the scene of the Drumcree standoffs. Each year, the Protestant Orange Order marches to a service at the church on the Sunday before 12th July, commemorating the 1690 Protestant victory at the Battle of the Boyne. Residents of the nearby Catholic district prevented the march from continuing through their neighbourhood. Thousands of Orangemen and loyalists gathered at Drumcree and violently tried to force their way through, but were held back by the security forces, who built large steel and barbed wire barricades. These yearly "sieges" of Drumcree ended in the early 2000s, although the dispute continues.

== History of the site ==
Drumcree is the townland in which the church is located. Its name comes from Irish Droim Crí meaning "boundary ridge", most likely referring to the River Bann marking the boundary between the old districts of Clancann and Clanbrassil.

There had been a church on the site since the Middle Ages. The Christian/Catholic parish of Drumcree was formed in 1110, comprising sixty-six townlands lying to the west of the Bann. The first recorded vicar was David MacRalagen, who died in 1414.

In September 1563, the powerful Irish chieftain Shane O'Neill of Tír Eoghain met the English Crown's representative Thomas Cusack at Drumcree. They agreed to the 'Treaty of Drumcree', whereby the English would acknowledge Shane as Earl of Tyrone and chief of the O'Neill dynasty, but this never came to pass.

The church and parish remained Catholic until after the Protestant Reformation in Ireland and the English conquest of the area in the early 1600s. It is unclear what happened to the church during the Reformation, but a map of 1609 shows the church in ruins.

Following the Plantation of Ulster in 1610, a new, Protestant church was built at this site. It was described as "a plain stone building rough cast and whitewashed". In 1812, a tower was built, and in 1814 a church bell was installed. In 1826 the rector, Charles Alexander, had a new rectory built.

== History of the present church ==
In 1854, the parish decided to build a new church. Its foundation stone was laid on Ascension Day, 17 May 1855. The church so built is the one that stands today and is on the same site as the former church. It was consecrated by the Bishop of Down, Connor and Dromore, Robert Bent Knox, on 28 October 1856.

When the Church of Ireland was disestablished in 1871, Drumcree lost most of its land, known as the glebe.

In 1901, a new burial ground was established on the north side of the church. The following year the Parochial Hall was built. A pipe organ was installed in the church in 1907, and a memorial to the Great War was built in 1921. The following year another burial ground, known as the Terrace Burial Ground, was created on the east side of the church. In 1989, a war memorial to commemorate those lost in World War II was erected. In 1992, major renovation work was carried out to repair the fabric of the building.

== Drumcree and the Orange Order ==
The Orange Order was founded in 1795 in and around the County Armagh town of Portadown. The first Orange service and church parade from Drumcree was on 1 July 1795. That parade was instigated by Protestant ministers in the Portadown area. One of them, the Reverend George Maunsell, gave a sermon in June 1795. Maunsell called on his congregation: "to celebrate the anniversary of the Battle of the Boyne in the true spirit of the institution" by attending a sermon to be given by the Reverend Devine of the Established Church at Drumcree on Sunday 1 July. That first Sunday "church parade", like many since, was celebrated by Protestants with "wrecking" and bloodletting in the parish of Drumcree.

Historian Francis Plowden described the events that followed the sermon in his History of Ireland (Vol. I, p. 17), published in 1809:

This evangelical labourer in the vineyard of the Lord of peace so worked up the minds of his audience, that upon retiring from service, on the different roads leading to their respective homes, they gave full scope to the antipapistical zeal, with which he had inspired them, falling upon every Catholic they met, beating and bruising them without provocation or distinction, breaking the doors and windows of their houses, and actually murdering two unoffending Catholics in a bog. This unprovoked atrocity of the Protestants revived and redoubled religious rancour. The flame spread and threatened a contest of extermination...

Plowden recounts a similar assault on Catholics in Lurgan, but there influential Catholics and Protestants living east of the river Bann convened a meeting and succeeded in maintaining the peace in that area. In Portadown, the Catholic Defenders "remained under arms for three days successively, challenging their opponents to fight it out fairly in the field rather that harass them with murderous nocturnal visits".

Seven weeks later, on 21 September, a party of Defenders was routed by a smaller but better armed coalition of "wreckers" at the Diamond, four miles from Drumcree. The "wreckers" were under the command of a Captain Giffard from Dublin. William Blacker, a member of the landed gentry and commander of the Seagoe Yeomanry, was later attributed a role in the affray. He is said to have stripped lead from the roof of his house to make ammunition in preparation for the ambush of Catholic Defenders at the Diamond. This may have been a legend among Orange men that helped establish an affinity with the aristocracy in the minds of the Protestant peasantry. After the Diamond skirmish, Protestant leaders adopted the name "Orange Boys". This was changed to "the Orange Order" as the "wreckers" became more organised under the leadership of Blacker and James Verner, an attorney and agent for the Armagh estates of absentee landlord, Lord Charlemont.

Traditionally the Orangemen parade from the centre of Portadown, returning after the church service. Since the late 20th century, , the Orangemen have often characterised the church service and accompanying parades as commemorating the men of the 36th (Ulster) Division who died during the Battle of the Somme in 1916.

Portadown is a predominantly Protestant town. The small area surrounding the Garvaghy Road is a small Catholic community within Portadown. That community has long been subjected to sectarian discrimination, marginalisation, and abuse. The Orange Order insists it is their right as citizens to march down the Garvaghy Road, a route they say holds traditional and communal value.

The residents of Garvaghy Road have insisted it is their right not to be subjected to marches perceived by many as sectarian and intimidating. The stand-off between the Orangemen and the Royal Ulster Constabulary (RUC), which previously facilitated the Orange demonstrations of strength, has become symbolic of the sectarian divide that shapes relations between the two communities in Northern Ireland. Local anthropologist Peter Mulholland has argued that Orange parades deny the rights and dignity of the minority community by annually reviving sectarian hostility.

In the early 1980s, when such parades still took place and catalysed violence, a small group of Portadown Nationalists documented the Plowden report and other instances of Orange parade‑related violence during the two centuries since 1795. They circulated this material to journalists in 1996-7 under the title "Two Hundred Years in the Orange Citadel". Their research was also included in Nationalist submissions to the British government's "North" commission of inquiry into sectarian parades.

In 1998, the Parades Commission banned the Orangemen's parade. Every year since, the parade has been prevented from proceeding down the Garvaghy Road. In an attempt to defuse the situation, the General Synod of the Church of Ireland requested the Reverend John Pickering, then Rector of Drumcree Church, to refrain from holding the Orangemen's service. The Primate of the Church of Ireland, Dr. Robin Eames, stated that "It is a form of blasphemy if, following a religious service, those who have attended it engage in behaviour which makes a mockery of such a service." Pickering however refused the request, maintaining that "the doors of my church are open to anyone, including Orangemen".

In 2007, following the Northern Ireland power-sharing agreement, the Orange Order parade passed peacefully. The Order is still blocked from marching down the Garvaghy Road.

In 2026, the Parades Commission approved the Orange Order parade on the Garvaghy Road, the first time in 28 years that the Order had been permitted to do so.
