= Clive Liddell =

British Army general (1883–1956)

General Sir Clive Liddell KCB CMG CBE DSO
- Born: 1 May 1883; Huddersfield, Yorkshire, England
- Died: 9 September 1956 (aged 73); Chelsea, London, England
- Military career
- Allegiance: United Kingdom
- Branch: British Army
- Service years: 1902–1943
- Rank: General
- Nickname: "Jock"
- Service number: 12844
- Unit: Leicestershire Regiment
- Commands: Gibraltar (1939–41); 4th Division (1935–37); 47th (2nd London) Division (1935); 8th Infantry Brigade (1931–34); 1st Battalion, Leicestershire Regiment (1926–28)
- Conflicts: First World War; Second World War
- Awards: Knight Commander of the Order of the Bath; Companion of the Order of St Michael and St George; Commander of the Order of the British Empire; Distinguished Service Order; Mentioned in Despatches (6); Officer of the Order of the Crown of Italy

General Sir Clive Gerard Liddell, KCB, CMG, CBE, DSO (1 May 1883 – 9 September 1956) was a senior British Army officer who served as Adjutant-General to the Forces from 1937 to 1939. He was Governor of Gibraltar from 1939 to 1941 during the early stages of the Second World War.

== Military career ==
Liddell attended Uppingham School before enrolling at the Royal Military College, Sandhurst. He was commissioned into the British Army as a second lieutenant in the Leicestershire Regiment on 22 October 1902.

He was an adjutant from 1908 to 1911 and then became a staff captain at 6th District of Northern Command in April 1912.

He served in the First World War as assistant adjutant and quartermaster general at the War Office.

After the war Liddell became an instructor at the Staff College, Camberley. He then went to the Imperial Defence College in 1927. He became a General Staff Officer at the War Office in 1928 and then Commander 8th Infantry Brigade in 1931.

He became general officer commanding (GOC) 47th (2nd London) Division in January 1935 and then GOC 4th Division in November 1935 before becoming Adjutant-General to the Forces in 1937. He was promoted to lieutenant general on 29 January 1938 and appointed Governor and Commander-in-Chief of Gibraltar in 1939, a post he held until 1941. During his tenure of this post he organised the evacuation of all families of British service personnel and civilians from Gibraltar. He served as Inspector General for Training from 1941 to 1942; he retired in 1943.

Liddell was also Colonel of the Royal Leicestershire Regiment from 1943 to 1948 and Governor of the Royal Hospital Chelsea from 1943 to 1949.

== Bibliography ==
- Smart, Nick (2005). Biographical Dictionary of British Generals of the Second World War. Barnsley, South Yorkshire: Pen and Sword Books. ISBN 1844150496.

Military offices
Preceded by Richard Oldman	GOC 47th (2nd London) Division; January–November 1935	Succeeded by Harry Willans
Preceded by James Dick-Cunyngham	GOC 4th Infantry Division; 1935–1937	Succeeded by Dudley Johnson
Preceded by Sir Harry Knox	Adjutant General; 1937–1939	Succeeded by Sir Robert Gordon-Finlayson
Government offices
Preceded by Sir Edmund Ironside	Governor of Gibraltar; 1939–1941	Succeeded by Viscount Gort
Honorary titles
Preceded by Sir Harry Knox	Governor, Royal Hospital Chelsea; 1943–1949	Succeeded by Sir Bernard Paget
Preceded by Sir Edward Woodward	Colonel of the Leicestershire Regiment; 1943–1948	Succeeded by Harold Pinder
