= Townley Hall =

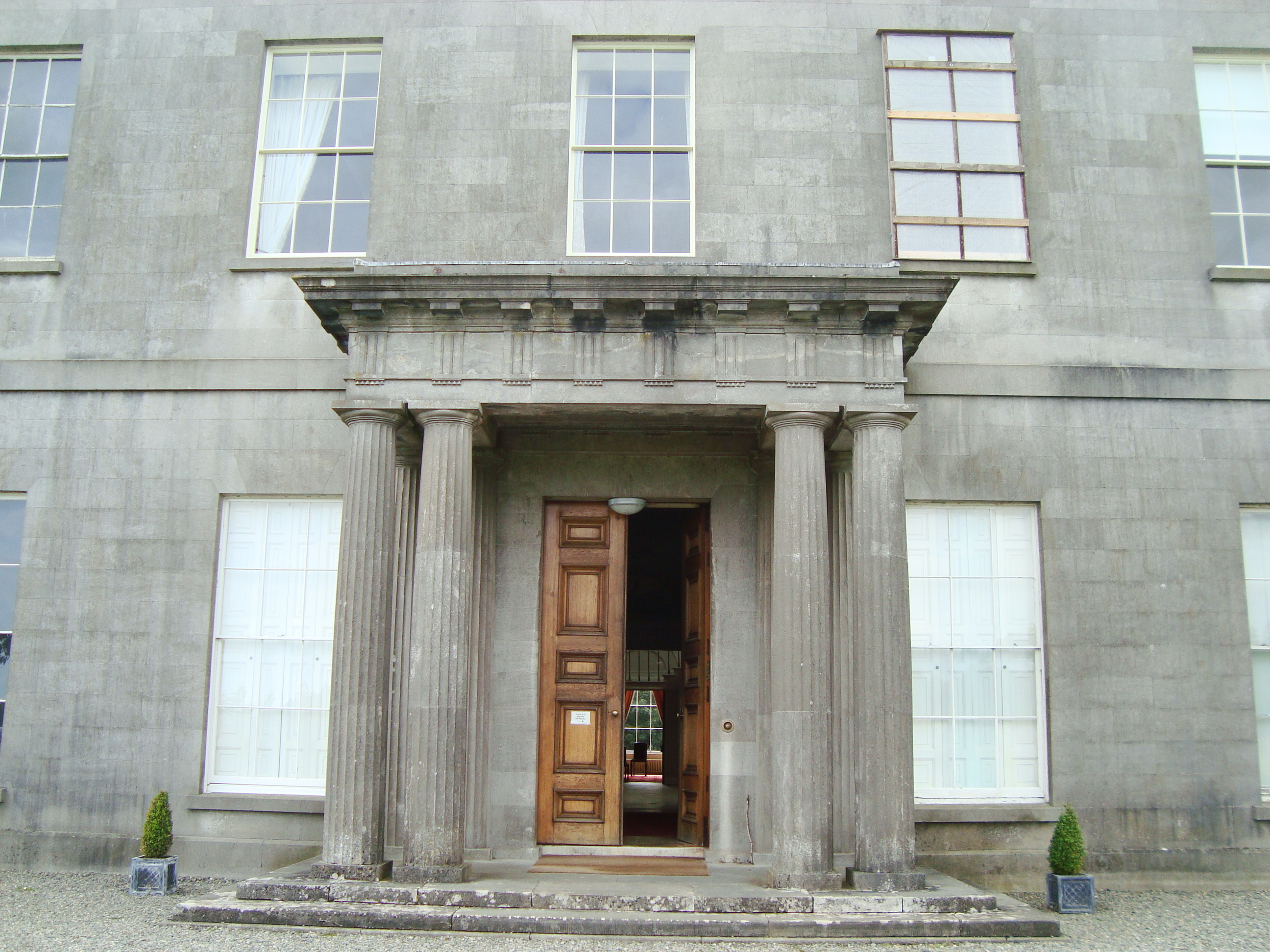
- Doric portico at Townley Hall

General information
- Status: Private dwelling house
- Type: House
- Architectural style: Georgian
- Location: Tullyallen, County Louth, Ireland
- Coordinates: 53.7274417°N 6.443661°W
- Construction started: 1794
- Completed: 1802

Technical details
- Material: limestone

Design and construction
- Architect: Francis Johnston
- Developer: Blayney Townley Balfour

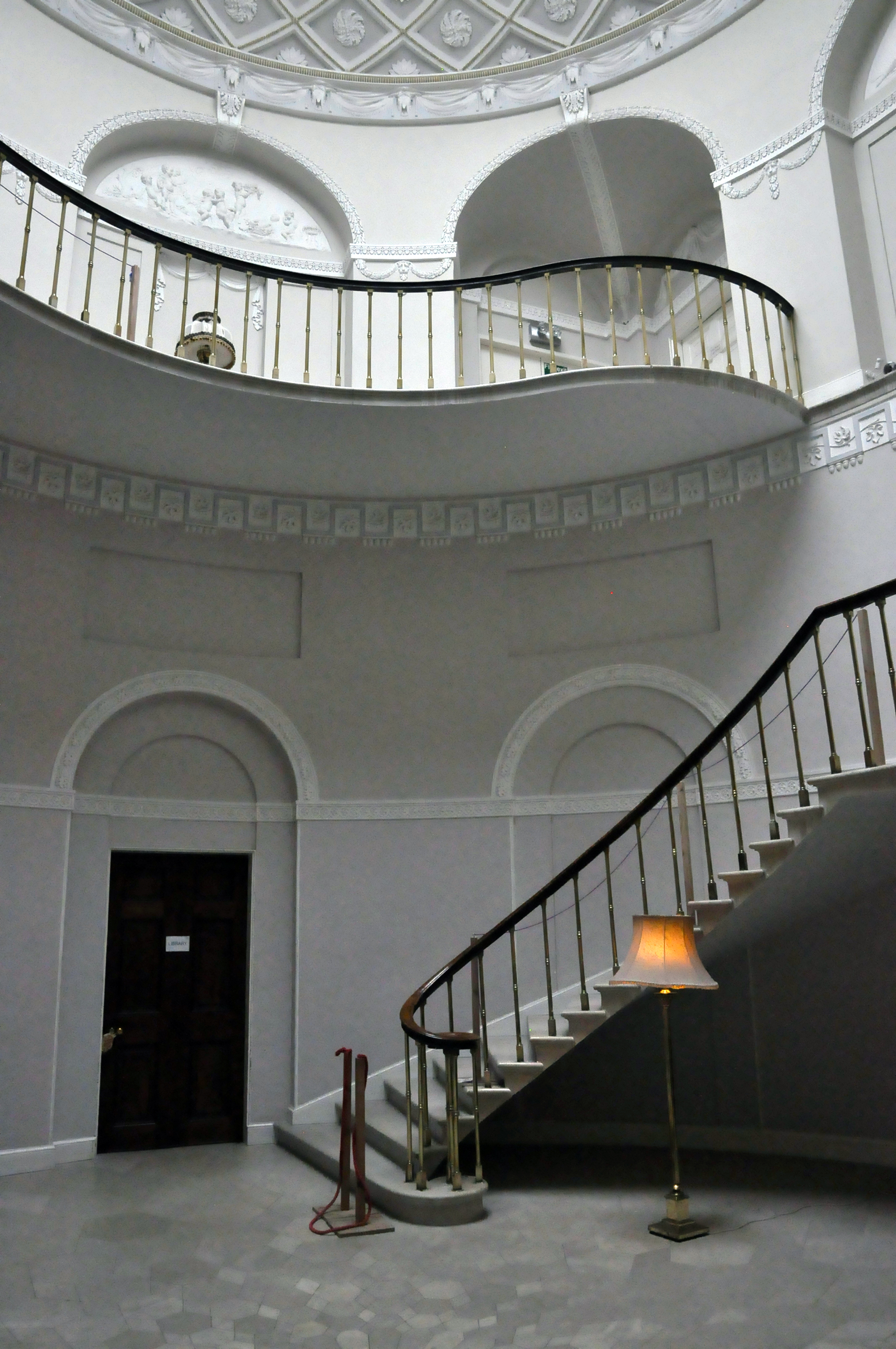
Staircase

Townley Hall is a Georgian country house which stands in parkland at Tullyallen, some 5 km west of Drogheda, in County Louth, Ireland. It was designed by Irish architect Francis Johnston for the Townley Balfour family, and built between 1794 and 1798.

The house is 27 metres (89 feet) square, built in local stone with simple neoclassical lines, broken only by a Doric portico. The interior is dominated by a spiral staircase in a domed rotunda. The building replaced a previous house which once stood some 100 metres (330 feet) to the north of the present building

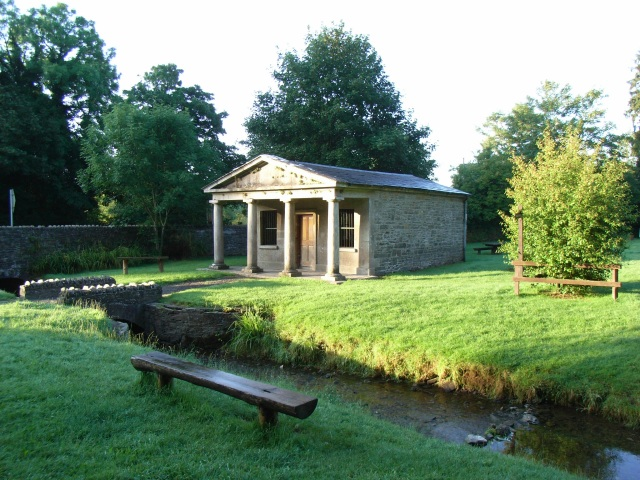
Boyne Lodge at Townley Hall

== History ==
The Townley estate had belonged to the Townley family since Cromwellian times. Blayney Townley, MP had inherited the wealth of his nephew, William Balfour, in 1739 and added Balfour to his surname. The Townley estate passed to his grandson, also Blayney Townley Balfour, later the MP for Belturbet, who in 1794 commissioned Francis Johnston to design the present house. Other buildings on the site, which were designed by Johnston, include the entrance gates and gate lodge, a dovecote, walled garden, farmyard and farmyard houses.

Mrs Townley Balfour, wife of the grandson of Blayney jnr, died childless in 1955 and the property passed to her cousin David Crichton. He sold the house and 350 hectares (860 acres) of land in 1957 to Trinity College, Dublin for use as an agricultural school. In 1967 Professor Frank Mitchell of Trinity College bought the house with some 25 hectares (62 acres) of surrounding land and ran it as a study centre for several years. In 1969 Trinity College sold 200 hectares (490 acres) of farmland to the Land Commission and 150 hectares (370 acres) of woodland to the Forestry Department.

The house is now owned by the School of Philosophy and Economic Science, a registered charity based in Ballsbridge Dublin, who use it as a residential study centre. The house and grounds are private and access is strictly by appointment.

== Residents ==
Among the residents of Townley Hall were, according to documents held by national Library of Ireland (MS 50,863).

- Anne Mary Balfour (1820–95).
- Blayney Balfour Townley (1832)
- Blayney Reynell Townley Esq. (head of household 1911)
- Elizabeth Sarah Balfour (1820–60).
- Florence Henrietta Townley Balfour (1881–93).
- John Willoughby Cole, 2nd Earl Enniskillen 1833
- Kathleen Balfour (1820–60).
- Letitia Frances Balfour (1828–85)
- Lowry Vessey Townley Balfour.
- Madeline Elizabeth Townley (1867-1955)
- Mary Frances Balfour (1820–60).
- Rev. William Townley Balfour (1888–95).

(Eight servants in 1911).

== See also ==
- Beaulieu House and Gardens
- Dowth Hall
