= Kathleen Knox =

Irish author and poet (1847–1930)

- Born: 26 January 1847; Hampstead, London, England
- Died: 21 February 1930 (aged 83); Belfast, Northern Ireland
- Other name: Edward Kane
- Relatives: Robert Knox

Kathleen Knox (26 January 1847 – 21 February 1930) was an Ulster-Scots author and poet who used the pen name Edward Kane in later life.

== Biography ==
Kathleen Knox was born to Charles George Knox and Isabella Hannah (née Bent) in 1847. She was the third of four daughters. Her father was Vicar general of Down and Connor as well as the younger brother of Robert Knox, Primate of All Ireland.

Knox began writing poetry when she was in school and her work was published in the Belfast Weekly Whig. Later she began writing novels, mostly for children, which included fairy tails. She was published by Griffith & Farran of London and Marcus Ward & Co of Belfast. From 1888, Knox began to write poetry again and was published in local newspapers and won prizes for her work. Though it got critical acclaim it was not as popular as her younger work. She was included in a number of anthologies of poets.

Knox worked as a teacher and lived in Belfast with her sisters.

== Works ==
- Father Time's Story Book (1873)
- Fairy Gifts: or, a Wallet of Wonders (1875)
- Lily of the Valley (1875)
- Meadowleigh: a Holiday History (1876)
- Seven Birthdays (1876)
- Wildflower Win (1876)
- Queen Dora: The Life and Lessons of a Little Girl (1879)
- Captain Eva: the story of a Naughty Girl (1880)
- Cornertown Chronicles: New Legends of Old Lore (1880)
- English Lessons for Schoolroom Use (1882)
- The Islanders (1888) as "Edward Kane"

=== Poetry ===
- Modern Irish Poets (1894)
- A treasury of war poetry, British and American poems of the world war, 1914-1919 (1917)
- Woodcraft (Sewanee Review, July 1921)
