= George Francis Mitchell =

Irish geologist and naturalist (1912–1997)

George Francis Mitchell, FRS, HonFRSE, MRIA (15 October 1912 – 25 November 1997) was an Irish geologist, naturalist and conservationist. He was generally known as Frank Mitchell.

== Career ==
He was born in Dublin, the son of David William Mitchell, a merchant, and his wife Frances Elizabeth Kirkby. He was educated at the High School in Dublin then studied Natural Sciences at Trinity College, Dublin, where he graduated BA. He was later awarded M.Sc (1935) and M.A. (1937).

He became assistant to the Professor of Geology, Knud Jessen, in 1934, and under his guidance carried out field studies of post-glacial sediments in Ireland. His lifetime interest, however, was in integrating the various disciplines in the study of the Irish natural environment and he developed interests in fields such as botany and archaeology. He bought Townley Hall from Trinity College and turned it into a study centre, which he personally funded and which enabled research in several different disciplines, particularly archaeological investigations at Knowth.

He was elected a Fellow of Trinity College in 1944, followed by appointment to a readership in Irish Archaeology. He was appointed to the Chair of Quaternary Studies in 1965. He published a number of books, and made multiple broadcasts.

== Honours and voluntary leadership roles ==
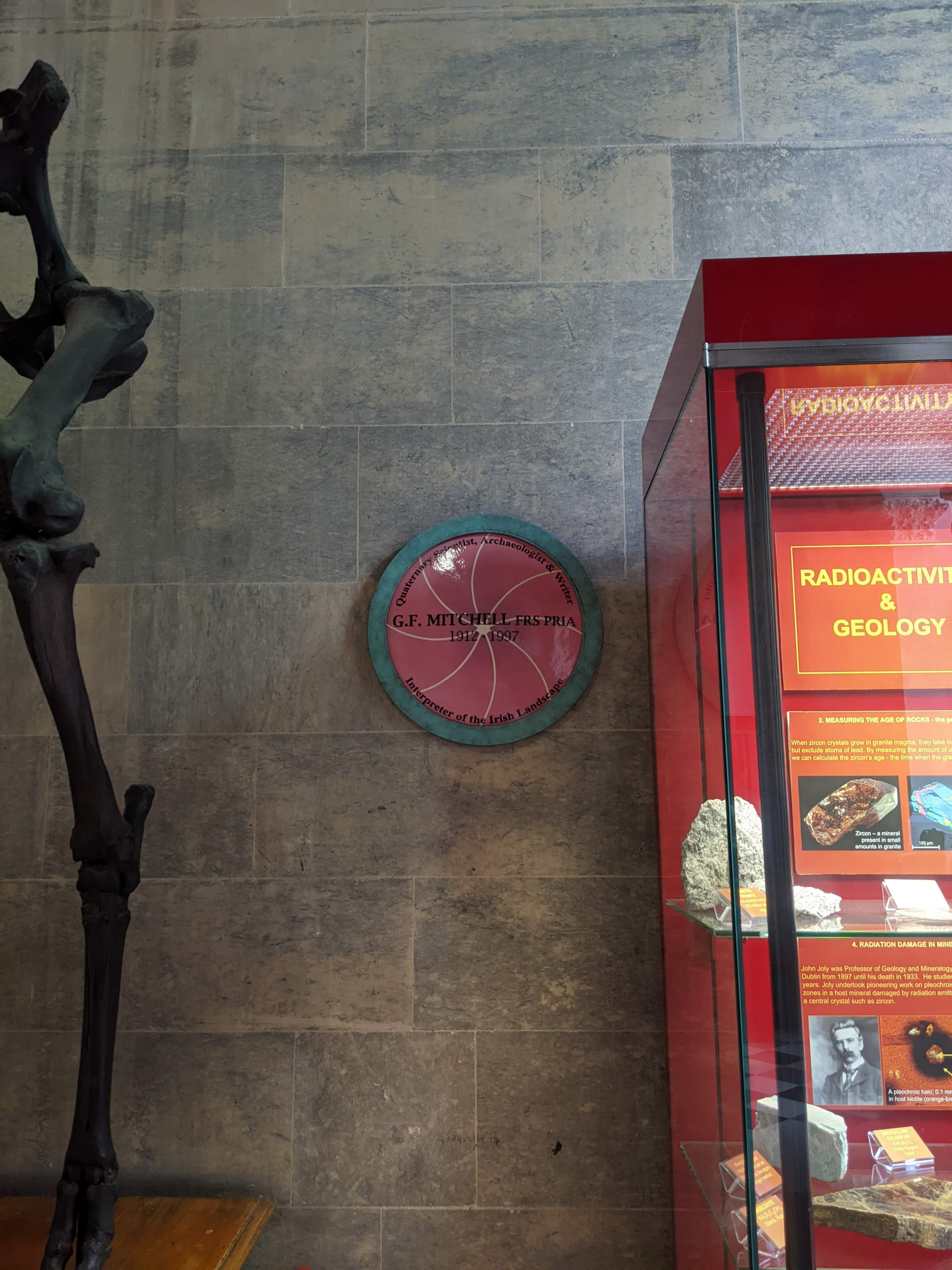
Plaque to Mitchell in the Museum Building, Trinity College

Mitchell was elected a Fellow of the Royal Society in 1973, and a member of the Royal Irish Academy, sometimes described as Ireland's highest academic honour. He was awarded the Boyle Medal of the Royal Dublin Society in 1978 and the Cunningham Medal of the Royal Irish Academy in 1989.

He was President of the Royal Society of Antiquaries of Ireland for 1957–60, the International Quaternary Association for 1969–73, the Royal Irish Academy for 1976–79, and of An Taisce, of which he had been a founding member, for 1991–93.
