= Theodore Janssen =

French-born English financier and member of parliament

Sir Theodore Janssen, possibly with fellow founders of the South Sea Company. c.1720 Attributed to William Hogarth

Sir Theodore Janssen of Wimbledon, 1st Baronet (1650s, Angoulême, Angoumois, France – 22 September 1748, Wimbledon, London) was a French-born English financier and member of parliament who, after a long and successful career in commerce, was ruined and disgraced by his part in the South Sea Bubble.

== Life ==
Janssen was born in Angoulême, France, son of the paper maker Abraham Janssen and Henriette Manigault. His grandfather, Theodore Janssen de Heez, had taken refuge in France from the Duke of Alba's persecution in the Netherlands. Janssen moved to England in 1680, making his home at Wimbledon, where he bought Wimbledon manor.

He was naturalised as an English subject in 1685, and later knighted by King William III on 26 February 1698. In 1694 he was a founder-member of the Bank of England, investing £10,000 and becoming a director. In 1697 he published a pamphlet A Discourse concerning Banks, and in 1713 his treatise General Maxims of Trade.

At the particular request of the Prince of Wales, he was created a baronet on 11 March 1715, shortly after the accession of George I. He entered Parliament in 1717 at a by-election, as member for Yarmouth (Isle of Wight).

By 1720, Janssen had accumulated a fortune of almost quarter of a million pounds. However, among his business interests had been the South Sea Company, of which he was a director. On the collapse of the company he, together with the other directors, was arrested and summoned before the House of Commons to account for himself. After he and Jacob Sawbridge, the first two directors to be summoned, had been heard, a motion was proposed and passed unanimously that both "were guilty of a notorious Breach of Trust, as Directors of the SouthSea Company, and thereby occasion'd very great Loss to great Numbers of his Majesty's Subjects, and had highly prejudic'd the publick Credit".

They were statutorily disqualified from sitting in Parliament or holding public office and their assets confiscated to make reparations to the investors ruined in the crash. Janssen was allowed to keep £50,000, a much-higher proportion than most of the other directors.

== Family ==
He married Williamza or Williamsa Henley (died 2 September 1731) on 26 January 1698 at Christ Church Greyfriars, London, and had issue, including Abraham, Henry, and Stephen. He died in 1748. He was succeeded in the baronetcy by his eldest son, Abraham, who had also been a member of parliament at the time of his father's disgrace, but never sat again after the end of that Parliament. Each of the three brothers inherited the baronetcy in turn, as none had any sons; the elder two died unmarried, in 1765 and 1766 respectively. His daughter Barbara married Governor Thomas Bladen. His daughter Mary married Charles Calvert, 5th Baron Baltimore.

Williamsa Janssen, a granddaughter, married politician Lionel Damer in 1778.

== Final Years and Death ==
Sir Theodore continued to live quietly in Wimbledon after he was stripped of the manor in 1721, next to the present day Wimbledon Village High St. He died in 1748 and is buried in the churchyard of St Mary's Church, Wimbledon.

== Portrayal in fiction ==
Janssen is a central character in Robert Goddard's historical novel Sea Change.

Parliament of Great Britain
Preceded by Henry Holmes; Sir Robert Raymond	Member of Parliament for Yarmouth (Isle of Wight); 1717–1721; With: Anthony Morgan	Succeeded by Anthony Morgan; William Plumer
Baronetage of England
New creation	Baronet (of Wimbledon); 1715–1748	Succeeded by Abraham Janssen
