= Charles Knox (priest) =

English religious figure

Member of Parliament for Dungannon
- In office 1798–1799 Serving with James Verner

Personal details
- Born: 10 January 1770
- Died: 30 January 1825 (aged 55)
- Children: Primate Knox
- Parent: Thomas Knox (father)
- Relatives: Thomas Knox (brother); William Knox (brother); George Knox (brother); Edmund Knox (brother)
- Education: Trinity College, Dublin

Charles Knox (10 January 1770 – 30 January 1825) was Archdeacon of Armagh from 1814 until his death.

The 6th son of the 1st Viscount Northland, he was born in Dublin and educated at Trinity College there. He was Member of Parliament for Dungannon from 1798 to 1799. He was ordained in 1799 and held livings at Dunkerron, Drumachose and Urney. He was a Prebendary of Derry from 1807 and St Patrick's Cathedral, Dublin from 1817. He was the father of Primate Knox and brother of Bishops William and Edmund Knox.

== Notes ==
Parliament of Ireland
Preceded by George Knox	Member of Parliament for Dungannon; 1798–1799; With: James Verner	Succeeded by Succeeded by the Westminster constituency
Church of Ireland titles
Preceded by William Sturrock	Bishop of Derry; 1814–1825	Succeeded by Edward Stopford (bishop)
