= Sir Stephen Janssen, 4th Baronet =

English Member of Parliament and Lord Mayor of London

Sir Stephen Janssen
- Baronet Janssen of Wimbledon
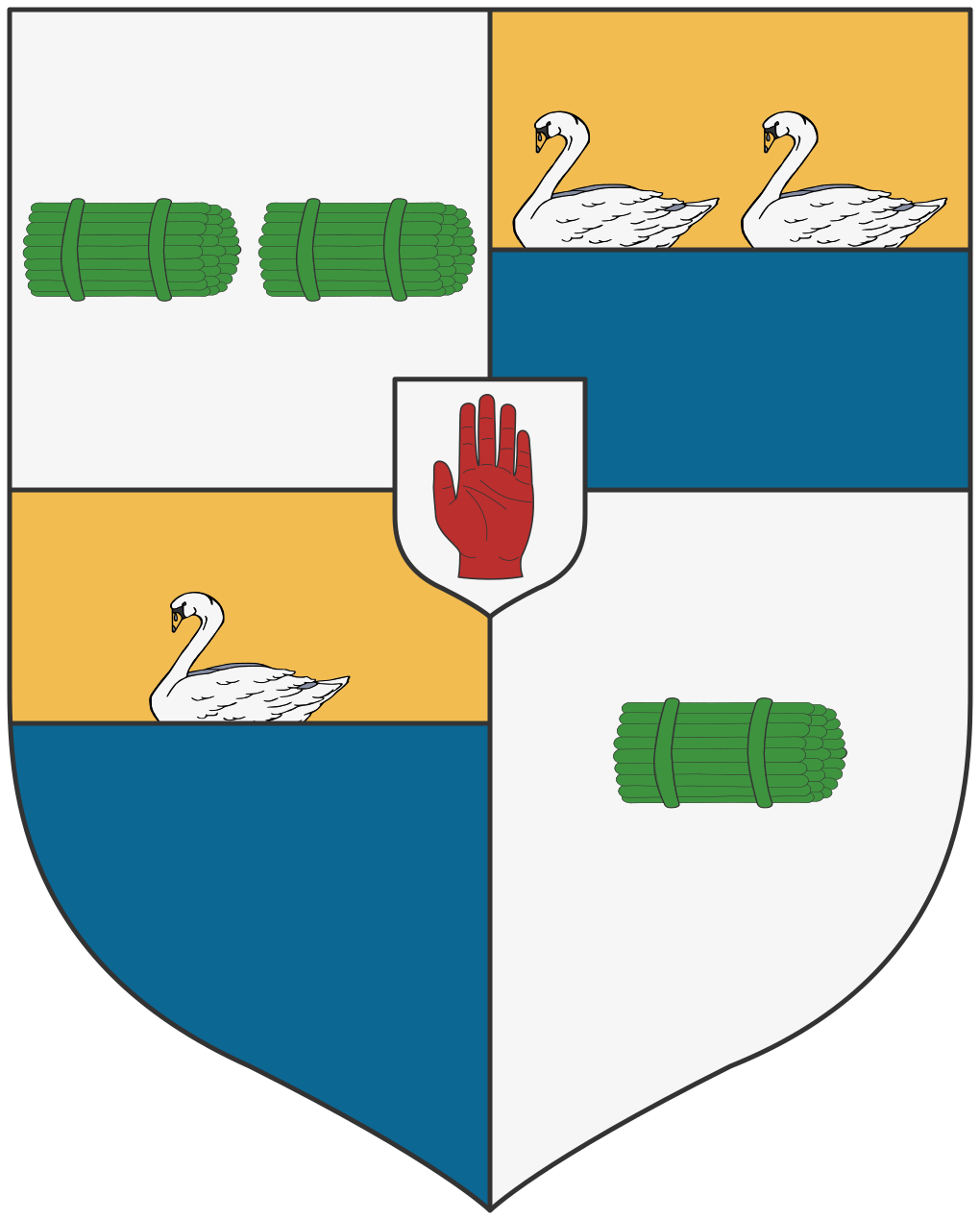
- Coat of arms
- Tenure: 1766–1777
- Predecessor: Sir Henry Janssen, 3rd Baronet
- Successor: Title extinct
- Spouse: Catherine Soulėgre (m. 1750)
- Issue: Henrietta Janssen
- Father: Theodore Janssen

Sir Stephen Theodore Janssen, 4th Baronet (died 7 April 1777) was an English Member of Parliament and Lord Mayor of London.

== Biography ==
He was the 4th son of Sir Theodore Janssen, 1st Baronet and the younger brother of Sir Abraham Janssen, 2nd Baronet. He succeeded his other elder brother Sir Henry Janssen, 3rd Baronet to the baronetcy in 1766.

He was a London stationer and master of the Stationers Company from 1749 to 1751. He was elected an Alderman of the city of London in 1749 (until 1765), Sheriff of the City of London for 1749–50 and Lord Mayor of London for 1754–55.

He was also the Member of Parliament for London from 1747 to 1754 and Chamberlain of London from 1765 to 1776. In 1749 he was appointed one of the Trustees for the Establishment of the Colony of Georgia in America.

He died in 1777. He had married in 1750, Catherine, the daughter of Col. Peter Soulėgre of Antigua, and had a daughter, Henrietta, but no sons. The baronetcy therefore became extinct on his death. Henrietta married Lorenzo Moore (MP for Dungannon).

Civic offices
| Preceded by Thomas Rawlinson | Lord Mayor of London; 1754–1755 | Succeeded by Slingsby Bethell |
Baronetage of Great Britain
| Preceded by Henry Janssen | Baronet (of Wimbledon); 1766–1777 | Extinct |
