= Blayney Townley-Balfour (governor) =

Lieutenant-governor of the Bahamas 1833–1835

Blayney Townley Balfour JP (1799 – 5 September 1882) was Lieutenant Governor of the Bahamas from 1833 to 1835.

== Biography ==
Blayney Townley Balfour was born in Ireland in 1799, and educated at Christ Church, Oxford. His father and great-grandfather (both also called Blayney Townley-Balfour) were both Irish MPs.

In June 1833 he assumed the governorship of the Bahamas after Sir James Carmichael-Smyth, the previous governor, was appointed to the governorship of British Guiana. During this period he oversaw the implementation of the Slavery Abolition Act 1833, which came into effect on 1 August 1834.

In 1833 and 1834 he deployed troops multiple times to Exuma to "restore discipline" among Lord Rolle's slaves (later 'apprentices') there. However, the transition in August 1834 was otherwise "quiet and orderly", perhaps due in part to the fact that a system of indentured apprenticeships (understood by many including Balfour himself to benefit the holders more than the apprentices themselves) had been employed in the Bahamas since 1811, as well as to the threat of force

In 1843 he married Elizabeth Catherine Reynell, with whom he had four children. He died on 5 September 1882.
