= Tullyallen, County Louth =

Town in County Louth, Ireland

Tullyallen Tulaigh Álainn (Irish)
- Town
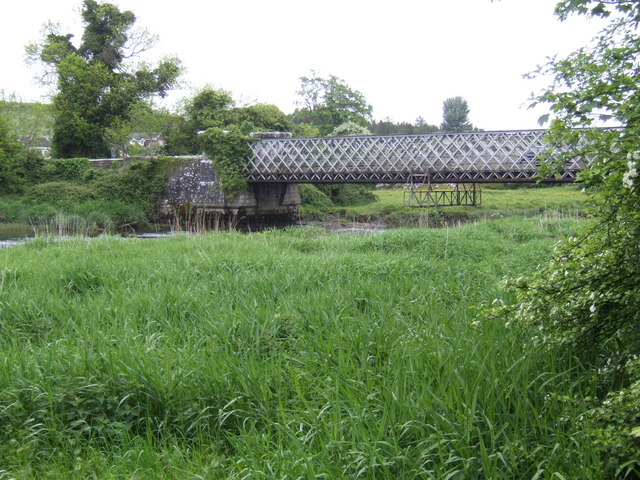
- Bridge across the Boyne at Tullyallen

- Location in Ireland
- Coordinates: 53°44′19″N 6°24′39″W
- Country: Ireland
- County: County Louth
- Elevation: 70 m (230 ft)

Population (2022)
  - Total: 1,697
- Irish Grid Reference: O048777

Tullyallen (Irish: Tulaigh Álainn) is a town, civil parish and townland (of approx. 960 acres) 6 km north-west of Drogheda in County Louth, Ireland. It is in the historic barony of Ferrard. It is located in the historical Boyne Valley, in the Catholic parish of Mellifont (named after the nearby Mellifont Abbey); it is also close to Newgrange, Knowth and Dowth burial mounds, Monasterboice monastery, and to the Battle of the Boyne site.

== Name ==
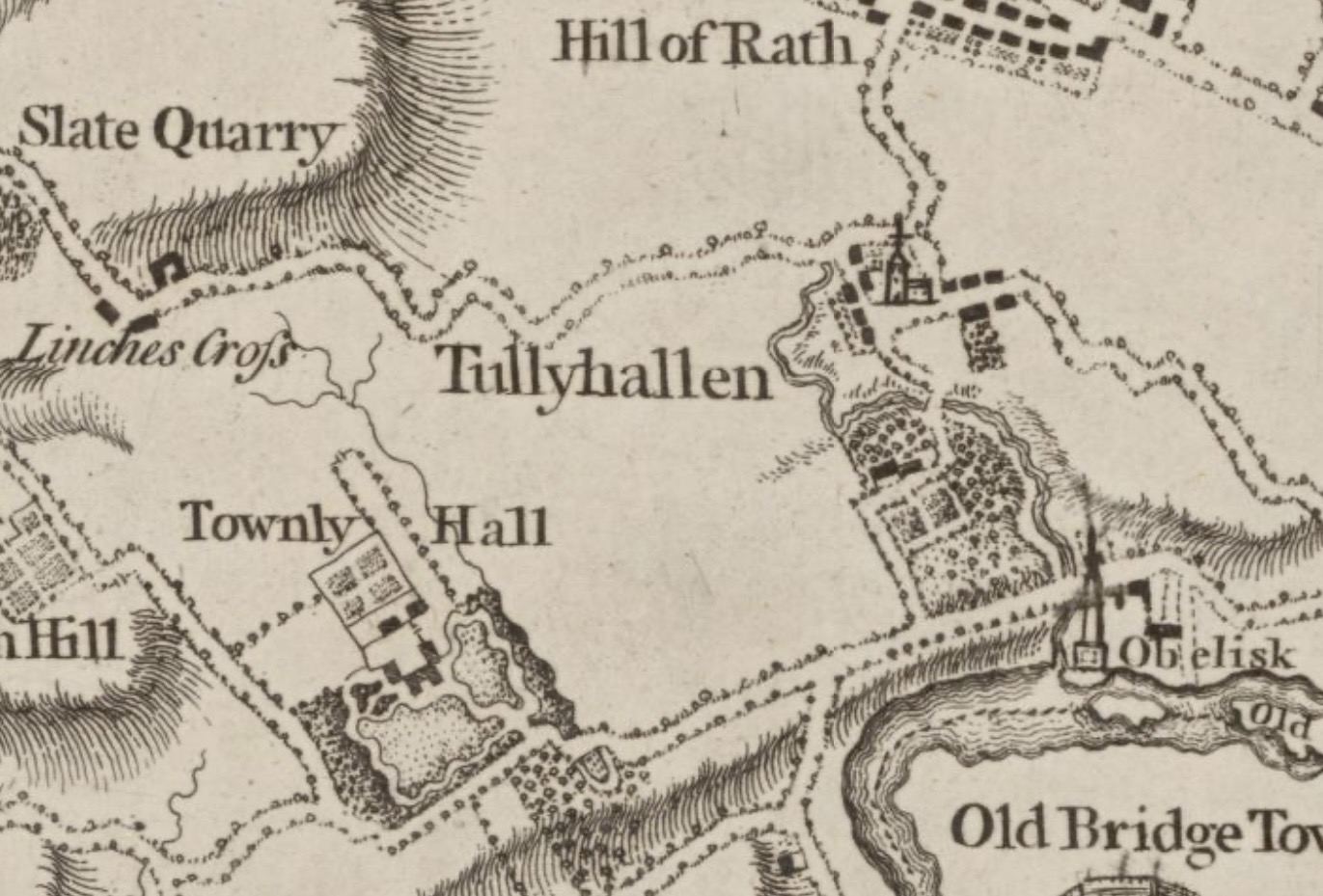
A map, by Matthew Wren, of 1766 which shows the placename as "Tullyhallen"

The Placenames Database of Ireland and Louth County Council give the Irish name of the town as Tulaigh Álainn. In Irish Local Names Explained, published in 1923, Patrick Weston Joyce suggests that Tullyallen derives from Tulaigh Áluinn meaning 'beautiful hill'. The Placenames Database of Ireland refers to a similar derivation, while also suggesting that Tullyallen (or Tullyhallen) derives from Tullaigh Ailin meaning 'Allen's Hill'.

== Amenities ==
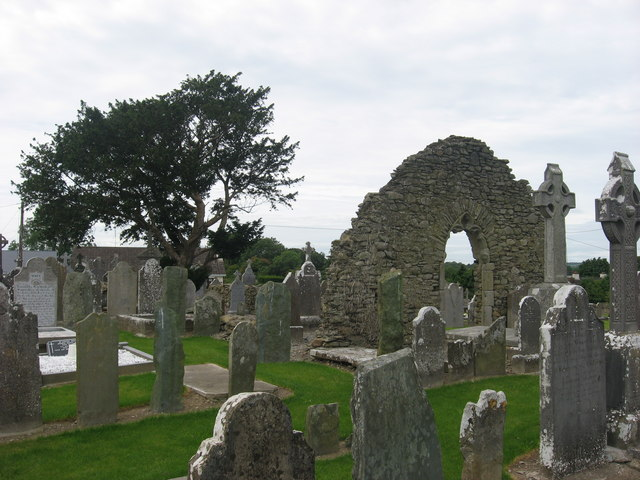
Ruins of a church in Tullyallen

Amenities within Tullyallen include a community hall, primary school, pub, GAA grounds, fast-food takeaway, convenience store and several retail outlets. Also nearby is Townley Hall and its parkland, including Townley Hall Golf Club and the Bellnumber Wood portion of the Boyne Valley Camino. The latter is a 25 km (16 mi) looped walk which passes through Tullyallen. A children's playground, funded by the local community, was opened in October 2011 by the then President of Ireland, Mary McAleese.

The local Roman Catholic church, the Church of the Assumption in Mellifont parish, was built in 1898 and renovated in 2001.

== Education ==
The local primary school, Tullyallen National School, is a co-educational national school which was founded in the 1950s. As of 2026 it had more than 400 pupils enrolled. The school is under the patronage of the Archdiocese of Armagh.

== Sport ==
Tullyallen's GAA club is known as the Glen Emmets, and comprises football teams ranging from under-7s to seniors. The area also has an association football (soccer) team called Glen Abbey Rovers. Founded in 2009, the Rovers play in division 4 of the Meath And District League, playing their home games on the grounds of Albion Rovers FC, Monasterboice.

== Public transport ==
Bus Éireann route 182 from Ardee to Drogheda via Collon serves Tullyallen several times a day (not Sundays). The nearest train station is Drogheda railway station, approximately 7 km away.

== See also ==
- List of towns and villages in Ireland
