= Blayney Townley-Balfour (Belturbet MP) =

Irish politician (1769–1856)

Blayney Townley-Balfour JP DL (28 May 1769 – 22 December 1856) was an Irish politician and member of the Protestant Ascendancy.

The Townley-Balfours were an Irish branch of Clan Balfour. His grandfather, also named Blayney Townley-Balfour, was a member of the Irish House of Commons (MP) for Carlingford. The grandson was MP for Belturbet in 1800. (Note: Burke says from 1797 to 1798.) He owned a large flour mill outside Slane. He commissioned architect Francis Johnston to rebuild Townley Hall, the family seat between Drogheda and Slane. He was a magistrate for counties Louth and Meath, High Sheriff of Louth in 1792, and deputy Lord Lieutenant of Louth in 1852.

Blayney Townley-Balfour married Lady Florence Cole, daughter of William Cole, 1st Earl of Enniskillen; they had ten children. His eldest son, also Blayney Townley-Balfour (born 1799), was Governor of the Bahamas from 1833 to 1835.
