= Dungannon (Parliament of Ireland constituency) =

Pre-1801 Irish constituency

Coordinates: 54.503°N 6.770°W

- Former borough constituency for the Irish House of Commons
- County: County Tyrone
- Borough: Dungannon

1613–1801
- Replaced by: Dungannon (UKHC)

Dungannon was a constituency represented in the Irish House of Commons until 1800.

== History ==
In the Patriot Parliament of 1689 summoned by James II, Dungannon was represented with two members.

== Members of Parliament, 1613–1801 ==
Election	First MP		Second MP
1613	Sir Garret Moore		Sir Hugh Pollerde
1634	Sir Faithful Fortescue		John Perkins
1639	John Chichester		Thomas Madden. died and repl. 1640 by Sir Phelim O'Neill
1661	Sir Arthur Chichester		Sir Thomas Bramhall
1689	Arthur O'Neill		Patrick Donnelly
1692	John Hamilton		Sir Robert Staples, 4th Bt
1695	John Hamilton		Thomas Knox
September 1703	Oliver St George (Note: Also elected for Carrick in 1703, for which he chose to sit.)		Thomas Knox
1703	Edward Brice		Thomas Knox
1713	Oliver St George		Thomas Knox
1727	Oliver St George		Charles Echlin
1731	Thomas Knox		Charles Echlin
1755	Thomas Knox		Thomas Knox
1769	John Knox		Thomas Knox
1776	Charles O'Hara		Thomas Knox
1781	Charles O'Hara		William Eden
October 1783	Edmund Sexton Pery (Note: Also elected for Limerick City in 1783, for which he chose to sit.)	Patriot	Hon. Thomas Knox
1783	Lorenzo Moore		Hon. Thomas Knox
1790	Hon. John Knox		Hon. George Knox
1794	James Verner		Hon. George Knox
1798	James Verner		Hon. Charles Knox
1799	James Verner		Richard Fortescue Sharkey
1801	Succeeded by the Westminster constituency Dungannon		

== Bibliography ==
- O'Hart, John (2007). The Irish and Anglo-Irish Landed Gentry: When Cromwell came to Ireland. Vol. II. Heritage Books. ISBN 0-7884-1927-7.
- Leigh Rayment's historical List of Members of the Irish House of Commons. Cites: Johnston-Liik, Edith Mary (2002). The History of the Irish Parliament 1692-1800 (6 volumes). Ulster Historical Foundation.
