= Charles Lindsey =

Charles Lindsey may refer to:

- Charles H. Lindsey (1931–2023), British computer scientist
- Charles Lindsey (editor) (1820–1908), English-born Canadian journalist and editor

== See also ==
- Charles Lindsay (disambiguation)
