= George Chinnery (bishop) =

Irish Anglican bishop

George Chinnery was an Anglican bishop in Ireland during the second half of the 18th century.

Chinnery was educated at Trinity College, Dublin. He was Dean of Cork from 1763 until 1779. On 21 December 1778 he was nominated to be Bishop of Killaloe and Kilfenora; and was consecrated on 7 March 1779. He was translated to Cloyne on 15 February 1780. He died in August later that year.
