= William Sturrock =

18th-19th century English clergyman

William Sturrock, Chancellor of Down Cathedral from 1781 to 1796, was Archdeacon of Armagh from 1797 until 1814.
