= Charles Lindsay (bishop) =

Scottish bishop (1760–1846)

Charles Dalrymple Lindsay (also spelt Lyndsay; 15 December 1760 – 8 August 1846), was Bishop of Killaloe and Kilfenora from 1803 to 1804 when he was translated to Kildare.

== Life ==
Lindsay was the son of James Lindsay, 5th Earl of Balcarres and Anne Dalrymple. He was educated at Wisbech Grammar School and then the University of Glasgow, and in 1779 received a Snell Exhibition to Balliol College, Oxford, graduating B.A. 1783, M.A. 1786, and D.D. at Glasgow in 1804. He was chairman of the Wisbech Canal company.

He held the following positions in the church:

- Vicar of St Peter and St Paul, Wisbech, Isle of Ely, Cambridgeshire 1787–1795
- Vicar of Sutterton, Lincolnshire 1793–1803
- Rector of Tydd St Giles, Isle of Ely, Cambridgeshire 1795–1803
- Bishop of Killaloe and Kilfenora 1803–1804
- Bishop of Kildare 1804–1846
- Dean of Christ Church Cathedral, Dublin 1804–1846

== Family ==
Linsday married firstly Elizabeth Fydell, daughter of Thomas Fydell MP, on 1 January 1790. They had three children:

- Charles Lindsay (1790–1855), Archdeacon of Kildare
- Elizabeth Frances Lindsay (1791–1812), married Sir Compton Domvile Bt MP
- Philip Yorke Lindsay (1795–1832)

Linsday married secondly Catherine Eliza Coussmaker, daughter of Evert George Coussmaker and Mary Heyward, on 2 June 1798. They had one child:

- George Hayward Lindsay (1799–1886)

John Welply Lindsay (1804–1869) claimed to be the illegitimate son of Charles Lindsay but no evidence has been found to support this claim.

== Notes ==
Church of Ireland titles
Preceded by William Knox	Bishop of Killaloe and Kilfenora; 1803–1804	Succeeded by Nathaniel Alexander
Preceded by George Lewis Jones	Bishop of Kildare; 1804–1846	Succeeded by Diocese united with Meath
