= Charles Lindsay (priest) =

Irish priest

Charles Lindsay (12 October 1790 – 23 April 1855) was an Anglican priest in Ireland during the nineteenth century, most notably Archdeacon of Kildare from 1818 until his death.

The son of Charles Dalrymple Lindsay, bishop of Kildare from 1804 to 1846, he was educated at Trinity College, Dublin. Lindsay was appointed prebendary of Harristown and 2nd canon of Kildare Cathedral in 1815; prebendary of St Michael's of Christ Church Cathedral, Dublin in 1823 and rector of St. Michael's Church, Dublin in 1826. He died on 23 April 1855.
