= Carlingford (Parliament of Ireland constituency) =

Pre-1801 Irish constituency

- Former borough constituency for the Irish House of Commons
- County: County Louth
- Borough: Carlingford

–1801
- Seats: 2
- Replaced by: Disfranchised

Carlingford was a constituency represented in the Irish House of Commons to 1801.

== History ==
In the Patriot Parliament of 1689 summoned by King James II, Carlingford was represented with two members.

== Members of Parliament ==
- 1559: John Neill and Sir Henry Radclyffe
- 1585: Robert Neill and Rice ap Hugh
- 1613–1615: Marmaduke Whitechurch and Sir Roger Hope
- 1634–1635: John Travers and Joshua Carpenter
- 1639–1643: Joshua Carpenter (died and replaced 1642 by Chichester Fortescue) and Bernard Saunders (Fortescue and Saunders both died in office 1642)
- 1643–1649 Edward Trevor and Edmund Keating
- 1661–1666: Sir George Rawdon, 1st Baronet and Edward Vernon

=== 1689–1801 ===
Election	First MP	Second MP
1689	Christopher Peppard FitzIgnatius	Bryan Dermod
1692	Elnathan Lum	Zaccheus Sedgwick
August 1695	Sir John Hanmer, 3rd Bt	Zaccheus Sedgwick
1695	Sir John Hanmer, 3rd Bt	Elnathan Lum
1703	Charles Dering	Arthur Hill
1705	Charles Dering	William Balfour
1713	Sir Hans Hamilton, 2nd Bt	James Stannus
1715	Blayney Townley	James Stannus
1721	Blayney Townley	William Stannus
1723	Robert Ross	William Stannus
1727	Robert Ross	Harry Townley
1741	Robert Ross	John Macarell
1757	Robert Ross	William Townley-Balfour
1760	Robert Ross	Blayney Townley-Balfour
1768	Robert Ross	Blayney Townley-Balfour
1776	Thomas Knox (Note: Styled as The Honourable from 1781)	Theophilus Blakeney
1783	Sir John Blaquiere (Note: Created a baronet in 1784)	Thomas Coghlan
1790	Sir Charles des Voeux, 1st Bt	James Blaquiere
January 1798	Robert Ross (Note: Also elected for Newry in 1798, for which he chose to sit)	Robert Johnson (Note: Also elected for Hillsborough in 1798, for which he chose to sit)
1798	Richard Magenis	Sir Thomas Lighton, 1st Bt
1801	Constituency disenfranchised	

== Bibliography ==
- O'Hart, John (2007). The Irish and Anglo-Irish Landed Gentry: When Cromwell came to Ireland. Vol. II. Heritage Books. ISBN 978-0-7884-1927-0.
- Leigh Rayment's historical List of Members of the Irish House of Commons. Cites: Johnston-Liik, Edith Mary (2002). The History of the Irish Parliament 1692-1800 (6 volumes). Ulster Historical Foundation.
