= Attorney General Knox =

Attorney General Knox may refer to:

- John C. Knox (Pennsylvania judge) (1817–1880), Attorney General of Pennsylvania
- Philander C. Knox (1853–1921), Attorney General of the United States
- William Knox (Queensland politician) (1927–2001), Attorney-General of Queensland
