= William Knox (bishop) =

Irish bishop

- Born: 14 June 1762
- Died: 10 July 1831 (aged 69)
- Education: Trinity College, Dublin
- Children: 12
- Father: Thomas Knox
- Relatives: Thomas George Knox (grandson); Thomas Knox (brother); George Knox (brother); Charles Knox (brother); Edmund Knox (brother)

The Rt Rev William Knox (14 June 1762 – 10 July 1831) was Bishop of Killaloe and Kilfenora from 1794 to 1803 when he was translated to Derry.

== Life ==
He was the fourth son of Thomas Knox, 1st Viscount Northland. At the age of about sixteen he entered Trinity College, Dublin, where in 1781 he graduated B.A. In 1786 he became rector of Pomeroy in the diocese of Armagh, after which he obtained the rectory of Callan in the Diocese of Ossory, and became chaplain to the Irish House of Commons.

On 21 September 1794 Knox was consecrated bishop of Killaloe in St Peter's Church, Dublin, by the Archbishop of Dublin, assisted by the Bishops of Limerick and Kilmore. In 1803 he was translated to the see of Derry, where he was enthroned on 9 September of that year.

He died on 10 July 1831. He published sermons.

== Family ==
Knox married in 1785 Anne, daughter of James Spencer, by whom he had twelve children, eight daughters and four sons. His eldest son, James Spencer Knox, D.D., was father of Thomas George Knox. George, the third son (1799–1881), was lieutenant-colonel in the Coldstream Guards.

== Notes ==
Church of Ireland titles
Preceded by Thomas Barnard	Bishop of Killaloe and Kilfenora; 1794–1803	Succeeded by Charles Dalrymple Lyndsay
Preceded by Frederick Hervey	Bishop of Derry; 1803–1831	Succeeded by Richard Ponsonby
