= James Verner (Irish parliamentarian) =

James Verner (1 March 1701 - 1787) was an MP in the Parliament of Ireland from County Antrim, Kingdom of Ireland. He was father to Sir William Verner, 1st Baronet. He and his sons played an instrumental role in the Battle of the Diamond near their home.

== Early life ==
James was the son of Henry Verner, Esquire (Note: Henry's father was Henry Verner of "Gullivenagh of County Antrim. His will was registered on 15 May 1683. He was buried at Loughgall, County Armagh.) and Anne Kerr. (Note: Burke and Kerr both identify James Verner and Anne Kerr as parents of William Verner, 1st Baronet, and James' father is Henry Verner. Belmore states that David Verner, Esquire is the father of James, grandfather of William. Elizabeth Crossle is stated by Belmore to be James' mother.) His siblings included David, Thomas, Mary and Anne. The Verner's descended from the Scotch Verners of Auchendinny (also spelled Auchentennie). In Scotland, they had property until 1650 (Note: According to historian John Kerr, "The main Verner family in Scotland was probably "planted" in Ulster about 1650.") near Edinburgh at Auchendinny starting in the 15th century and they spelled their name "Vernour". Prior to that, they are believed to have been Norman; Their surname was spelled "le Venour" and first appeared in England in the 13th century.

Henry and Anne had three sons and three daughters. James' siblings were Thomas, David, Mary and Anne. It is through childless Thomas that James' son William inherited the Churchill estate.

== Battle of the Diamond ==
In 1795, James Verner made himself known for his actions:

The Battle of the Diamond might have had a very different result had not James Verner and his sons with a party of the North Mayo militia seized the boats on the River Blackwater to prevent large numbers of Defenders from Tyrone and Londonderry from reaching the scene.

== Public service ==
Verner was a sheriff for the Armagh, Dublin, Meath, Monaghan and Tyrone counties.

For many years he was a member of the Irish parliament, beginning in 1794 when he represented the borough of Dungannon in County Tyrone. He accepted the position in John Knox's place when Knox took the position of escheator of Munster (i.e. resigned). In Dublin, he had a home at Dawson Street until 1801 and the Act of Union in 1801 (creation of the United Kingdom of Great Britain and Ireland).

== Personal life ==
He married Jane Clarke, daughter of Rev. Henry Clarke of Anasammery, Armagh and his wife, the daughter of John Atkinson, of Money. Their children included Thomas, James, David, John, Sir William Verner, 1st Baronet, and Elizabeth. In 1788, 5-year-old son William received the estate at Churchill (also Church Hill), Verner's Bridge in the County Armagh from his uncle Thomas Verner who had no children. James and Jane moved into the home with their family and were guardians of the residence until 1807.

Set the foundation stone on 28 August 1816 for the Tartaraghan St. Paul's Church.

James died in 1822 and Jane in 1827. Both are buried at Loughgall.

== See also ==
- Armagh disturbances
- Drumcree Church
