= Lorenzo Moore (MP) =

British Cavalry officer and Member of the Irish Parliament

Lorenzo Moore (1744–1798) was a British cavalry officer and a Member of the Irish Parliament for the constituencies of Dungannon and Ardfert.

== Biography ==
Lorenzo Moore, was born in 1744 in County Wexford, the son of William Moore (born 1716) and Frances (née Hodson) of (Tinraheen near Wexford, Ireland).

In 1774 Moore was in a captain in the 3rd Regiment of Horse. Moore became MP for Dungannon, County Tyrone, and probably resided in Merrion Square in Dublin.

In 1784 Lorenzo succeeded General Henry Seymour Conway as Colonel of the Battle Axe Guards of Dublin Castle. (Note: The Battle Axe Guards provided similar services in Dublin Castle as those provided by the Beefeaters in the Tower of London.)

== Family ==
On 1 October 1774 at St Anne's Church, Soho in London, Moore married Henrietta (died 29 July 1840 Twickenham, aged 87), daughter of Sir Stephen Janssen, 4th Baronet and Catherine, daughter of Colonel Soulégre of Antigua. They had three daughters and a son:

- Henrietta Catherine (baptised 12 September 1776)
- Williamza Caroline Mary, on 13 June 1823 married John Robert Budgen (1791–1866) eldest son of Thomas of Ballindoney, Ireland.
- Charles William Soulégre (baptised 30 April 1786)
