= John Knox (1758–1800) =

British Army officer

The Honourable John Knox
- Born: 1758
- Died: 1800 (aged 41–42)
- Military career
- Allegiance: United Kingdom
- Branch: British Army
- Rank: Major General
- Conflicts: French Revolutionary Wars: Flanders Campaign

John Knox (1758–1800) was a Member of the Irish Parliament and a martial-law commander during the Irish Rebellion of 1798, who sought to persuade the British government of the case for a legislative union with Ireland that would advance both Catholic emancipation and reform. A veteran of the Mysore Wars, in 1799 he saw further military, and diplomatic, service in the Duke of York's expedition to the Netherlands. In 1800, he was appointed as the Governor of Jamaica but was drowned on the Atlantic passage.

Knox was the son of Thomas Knox, 1st Viscount Northland, and Hon. Anne Vesey, daughter of John Vesey, 1st Baron Knapton, a fellow Irish peer. Knox served as Member of the Parliament of Ireland, first for Killybegs (County Donegal) from 1777 to 1783 and then, like his father before him, for Dungannon (County Tyrone) from 1790 to 1794. In the Irish House of Commons in support of the London-directed Dublin Castle Administration, against legislative independence (1780) but for Catholic Relief (1778, 1793).

In 1792, while still an MP, he served as in India under General Cornwallis during the Third Anglo-Mysore War, participated in the attack on Tipu Sultan's stronghold at Seringapatna, and was advanced in rank from lieutenant colonel to major general.

In 1796, as the Society of United Irishmen and the Catholic Defender allies, outlawed and despairing of reform, began organising for what they hoped would be a French-assisted insurrection, Knox was appointed martial-law commander of the mid-Ulster military district based in Dungannon. He raised units of local yeomanry whom he encouraged, despite his distaste for disorderly Protestant sectarianism, to wear Orange emblems to definitive proof of their loyalty. Yet while employing military coercion to break the republican conspiracy, Knox was advocating a broader, and he believed conciliatory, political strategy.

To Dublin Castle, Knox reported that the United Irishment were having to depart from their constitutional argument and "throw in the bait of the Abolition of Tithes, Reduction of Rents etc.". Nothing less would rouse "the lower orders of Roman Catholics" and nothing less, he suggested, would in time reconcile them to the alternative to separation, a union with Great Britain. Already, in the spring of 1797, he was arguing that the only way of securing Ireland for the British Crown, was to abolish its separate legislature, and with the security of a united kingdom and parliament, to advance a programme of reform. This should include not only admitting Catholic parliament and purging the administration of sinecures, but also an agrarian reform. In advance of other unionists, Knox believed that Irish landlords (whose rapaciousness he decried) should be obliged to offer sitting tenants leases on preferential terms.

In 1799, Knox took part in the Duke of York's expedition to the Netherlands. He served as commander of the Advance Guard, an elite brigade composed of grenadiers and light infantry. He negotiated and signed, as British representative, the Convention of Alkmaar that ended that campaign.

He was then appointed Governor of Jamaica, but drowned while travelling to the island in 1800. He was a passenger on HMS Babet, which disappeared in the Caribbean after having been last seen on 24 October 1800 at Martinique.

"...the loss of the Babet, the ship in which our dear John (General Knox) was gone out as Governor and Commander in Chief to Jamaica. Many, many tears did I shed for him, I loved him as a brother, and never, I believe, was there a man so deserving of the regard and regret everyone expressed for him. We long had hopes that the ship was not lost, as it was not seen to go down, but years have elapsed since, therefore no hope can be indulged, though I am sometimes fool enough to feel some, in spite of my almost conviction that it is impossible they ever should be realised."
