= Blayney Townley-Balfour (Carlingford MP) =

Irish politician (1705–1788)

Blayney Townley-Balfour or Blayney Townley Balfour, born Blayney Townley (1705–1788) was member of the Irish House of Commons for Carlingford in 1760 and again from 1761 to 1776. He took the surname Balfour to inherit property in County Fermanagh from his nephew William Charles Balfour.

He died at his country house, Townley Hall, in County Louth. His son, also Blayney, predeceased him; his grandson, also Blayney Townley-Balfour, inherited his property.
