= Thomas Knox, 1st Viscount Northland =

Anglo-Irish politician (1729–1818)

Thomas Knox

Representative peer for Ireland
- In office 1800–1818

Member of Parliament for Dungannon
- In office 1755–1781 Serving with Thomas Knox (1755–1769); John Knox (1769–1776); Charles O'Hara (1776–1781)

Personal details
- Born: 20 April 1729
- Died: 5 November 1818 (aged 89)
- Spouse: Hon. Anne Vesey (m. 1753)
- Children: 7, including Thomas, William, George, Charles and Edmund

Thomas Knox, 1st Viscount Northland (20 April 1729 – 5 November 1818), known as The Lord Welles between 1781 and 1791, was an Irish politician.

== Background ==
Thomas Knox was the son of Thomas Knox and Hester Echlin. He died on 5 November 1818 aged 89.

== Political career ==
Knox was Member of Parliament in the Irish House of Commons for Dungannon from 1755 until 1781. In 1781, he was elevated to the Peerage of Ireland as Baron Welles, of Dungannon in the County of Tyrone.

In 1791 Knox was ennobled as Viscount Northland, of Dungannon in the County of Tyrone. With the Act of Union and the abolition of the Irish Parliament in 1800, he became one of the 28 original Irish representative peers in the British House of Lords from then until his death.

About that time he was also appointed Custos Rotulorum of Tyrone.

== Family ==
Knox married Hon. Anne Vesey, daughter of John Vesey, 1st Baron Knapton and Elizabeth Brownlow in 1753. They had seven children:

- Thomas Knox, 1st Earl of Ranfurly (1754–1840)
- Maj.-Gen. Hon. John Knox (1758–1800)
- Hon. Vesey Knox (1760–1830)
- Hon. William Knox (1762–1831), Bishop of Derry
- Hon. George Knox (1765–1827), MP for Dublin University
- Hon. Charles Knox (1770–1825), Archdeacon of Armagh
- Hon. Edmund Knox (1772–1849), Bishop of Limerick

Parliament of Ireland
Preceded by Charles Echlin; Thomas Knox	Member of Parliament for Dungannon; 1755–1781; With: Thomas Knox 1755–1769; John Knox 1769–1776; Charles O'Hara 1776–1781	Succeeded by Charles O'Hara; William Eden
Political offices
New title	Representative peer for Ireland; 1800–1818	Succeeded by The Earl of Carrick
Peerage of Ireland
New creation	Viscount Northland; 1791–1818	Succeeded by Thomas Knox
New creation	Baron Welles; 1781–1818	Succeeded by Thomas Knox
