= Edmund Knox (bishop of Limerick, Ardfert and Aghadoe) =

Irish bishop

The Right Reverend Edmund Knox

Bishop of Killaloe and Kilfenora
- In office 1831–1834

Bishop of Limerick, Ardfert and Aghadoe
- In office 1834–1849

Personal details
- Born: 1772
- Died: 1849 (aged 76–77)
- Education: Trinity College, Dublin

Edmund Knox (1772 – 3 May 1849) was an absentee Irish bishop in the mid 19th century whose death at the height of the Irish Famine lead to a famously critical leading article in The Times.

He was born in 1772, the 7th and youngest son of Thomas Knox, 1st Viscount Northland and educated at Trinity College, Dublin. He was Dean of Down from 1817 to his elevation to the episcopate as Bishop of Killaloe and Kilfenora in 1831. Translated to become Bishop of Limerick, Ardfert and Aghadoe in 1834 he died in post on 3 May 1849.

Church of Ireland titles
Preceded by Richard Ponsonby	Bishop of Killaloe and Kilfenora; 1831–1834	Succeeded by Christopher Butson
Preceded by John Jebb	Bishop of Limerick, Ardfert and Aghadoe; 1834–1849	Succeeded by William Higgin
